= 1982 National Panasonic Series =

1982 Australian Formula 1 contest

The 1982 National Panasonic Series was an Australian motor racing contest for Australian Formula 1 cars (commonly referred to as Formula Pacific cars). It was the second running of the National Panasonic Series.

The series was won by Charlie O'Brien driving a Ralt RT4.

== Schedule ==
The series was contested over four rounds.

Round	Circuit	State	Date	Format	Round winner
1	Adelaide International Raceway	South Australia	4 July	Two races	Andrew Miedecke
2	Lakeside	Queensland	25 July	Two races	Charlie O'Brien
3	Calder	Victoria	1 August	Two races	Alfredo Costanzo
4	Oran Park	New South Wales	22 August	Two races	Charlie O'Brien

Rounds 1,2 & 3 were contested concurrently with Rounds 2, 4 & 5 of the 1982 Australian Drivers' Championship.

== Points system ==
Series points were awarded on a 9-6-4-3-2-1 basis for each round.

== Series standings ==
Position	Driver	Car	Entrant	Ade	Lak	Cal	Ora	Total
1	Charlie O'Brien	Ralt RT4/82 Ford BDD	Charlie O'Brien; O'Brien Heavy Haulage	4	9	-	9	22
2	Andrew Miedecke	Ralt RT4/81 Ford BDD	Andrew Miedecke	9	4	-	3	16
=	Alfredo Costanzo	Tiga FA82 Ford BDD; Tiga FA81 Ford BDD	Porsche Cars Australia	3	2	9	2	16
4	John Smith	Ralt RT4/81 Ford BDD; Ralt RT1	John Smith; OCL / AJCL	-	6	-	6	12
=	John Bowe	Ralt RT4/81 Ford BDD	Chris Leach Racing	6	-	6	-	12
6	Graham Watson	Ralt RT4/82 Ford BDD	Watson Motor Racing	-	-	3	4	7
7	Robert Handford	Ralt RT4/82 Ford BDD	Robert Handford	-	3	1	-	4
=	Bruce Allison	Ralt RT4/81 Ford BDD	Formula One Automotive	-	-	4	-	4
9	Phillip Revell	Ralt RT4/81 Ford BDD	Aub Revell	2	-	-	1	3
=	Richard Davison	Ralt RT4/81 Ford BDD	Clive Millis Motors Pty. Ltd.	-	1	2	-	3
11	Peter Williamson	Toleman TA860 Toyota 2T-G	National Panasonic Pty. Ltd.	1	-	-	-	1
