= 1980 Australian Grand Prix =

- Final round of the 1980 Australian Drivers' Championship
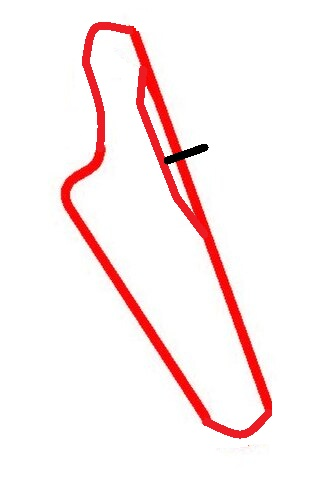

Race details
- Date: November 16, 1980
- Official name: XLV Australian Grand Prix
- Location: Calder Park Raceway, Melbourne, Victoria
- Course: Permanent racing facility
- Course length: 1.609 km (1.000 miles)
- Distance: 95 laps, 152.855 km (95 miles)
- Weather: Sunny

Pole position
Driver	(Australia) Alan Jones	Williams-Ford
- Time: 0'36.1

Fastest lap
Driver	(Australia) Alan Jones	Williams-Ford
- Time: 0'36.9

Podium
First	(Australia) Alan Jones	Williams-Ford
Second	(Italy) Bruno Giacomelli	Alfa Romeo
Third	(France) Didier Pironi	Elfin-Chevrolet

The 1980 Australian Grand Prix was a motor race held at Calder Park Raceway in Victoria, Australia on 16 November 1980.

It was the forty fifth Australian Grand Prix and it was open to cars complying with Australian Formula 1 regulations, which permitted international Formula One, Formula 5000 and Formula Pacific cars. The race was also the final round of the 1980 Australian Drivers' Championship.

The race was won by newly crowned 1980 World Drivers' Champion, Alan Jones, driving one of his championship winning Williams FW07 cars in front of an enthusiastic home crowd which came to see their new Australian hero. Italian driver Bruno Giacomelli finished second in the only other International Formula One car in the race, an Alfa Romeo 179. Third was French driver Didier Pironi driving an Australian built Elfin MR8 Formula 5000.

By winning the Australian Grand Prix, Alan Jones joined his father Stan Jones to become the first ever father and son to win the race. Stan Jones had won the 1959 Australian Grand Prix at the Longford Circuit in Tasmania driving a Maserati 250F. As of the 2024 race, Alan Jones remains the last Australian driver to have won the Australian Grand Prix.

== Background ==
Open wheel racing and motorsport in general was in serious decline in Australia in 1980 with most domestic motor racing grids in sharp decline. Early in the season it was announced that the 1980 Australian Drivers' Championship technical regulations, then known as Australian Formula 1, but was essentially Formula 5000, would be expanded to allow for a more diverse array of machinery. The previous year Formula Pacific, the regional name for the Formula Atlantic category had already been allowed to enter, but the relative small cars were not a close match to the considerably more powerful Formula 5000 cars.

The addition was to allow Formula One cars, like those competing in the World Championship, or more optimistically second-hand cars like those in the British AFX Aurora series. The move however only attracted British former F1 driver Guy Edwards driving a Fittipaldi.

Public interest in motor sport was at a new high after one of the darkest periods for the sport domestically early in 1980 as recession bit into fields. In the second half of the year Alan Jones closed in on winning the 1980 World Drivers' Championship, and was further increased by the hype after the 'rock incident' that befell touring car driver Dick Johnson at the 1980 Bathurst 1000.

== Entries ==
It was announced that the newly crowned world champion, Alan Jones, would return to Australia in November, bringing with him one of the Cosworth DFV powered Williams FW07Bs he used to win the world championship and would be the headline entry for the Australian Grand Prix extravaganza which was built up by Bob Jane who circumvented the rotational system of moving the Australian Grand Prix from state to state by securing it for his own race track, the tight confines of Calder Park Raceway. Jane's tyre retail company Bob Jane T-Marts became a sponsor of the Williams for the race.

Only one other Formula One car fronted for the race, a 3.0 litre V12 powered Alfa Romeo 179 entered by the factory Alfa Romeo team for Italian Bruno Giacomelli to drive. Race promoter Bob Jane hoped the presence of Alfa Romeo, Giacomelli, and the 1980 Australian Drivers' Champion, Italian born Melbourne resident Alfredo Costanzo, would entice members of Melbourne's large Italian community to attend the race.

French Ligier driver Didier Pironi would also be present, but he would race a Formula 5000, specifically the brand new Elfin MR9, the first and in the end only ground effect Formula 5000 constructed. However, the Adelaide based Ansett Team Elfin ran behind schedule in building the new car and with the new MR9 untested prior to the race, team boss and Elfin designer Garrie Cooper decided he would race the car himself while Pironi would join regular team leader John Bowe in racing one of the team's older, more conventional Elfin MR8s. As with most of the Formula 5000's, both Elfin's were powered by a 5.0 litre Chevrolet V8 engine.

One other Formula One car was entered, but the Repco-Leyland powered, ex-1973 British Grand Prix winning McLaren M23 (converted to Formula 5000 regulations) to be driven by its owner and former CAMS Gold Star winner John McCormack, would not make the start after McCormack was badly injured in a road crash when travelling from the team's base in Adelaide to Melbourne for the race. At the time in Australia there was a fuel strike which had grounded the airlines and McCormack, travelling with one of his mechanics, was a passenger in the car when the mechanic fell asleep at the wheel and the car ran off the road and hit a tree. McCormack, who was also asleep at the time, received a crack on the head, a broken left heel and some bruised ribs. His mechanic was seriously injured, though he also survived the accident.

The majority of the entry was made up of Lola F5000's of varying ages, with a number of locally constructed F5000s including Elfins, a Matich, some older British cars, and a trio of Formula Pacifics (one Ralt RT1, one Galloway HG1 and one March 77B) completing the entry.

== Qualifying ==
Formula One cars (a Wolf WR4-Ford and an Ensign MN09-Ford) had run in the 1979 Rothmans International Series and were actually beaten by the local Formula 5000's, although neither car was driven by a current F1 driver (David Kennedy and Geoff Lees), nor did either car use the then standard ground effect. The two Formula One cars at the 1980 Australian Grand Prix, the World Championship winning Williams-Ford and its star driver Alan Jones, and the factory V12 Alfa Romeo with Bruno Giacomelli at the wheel, proved early on that they were a class above the Formula 5000s with notice first served when people saw the differences in braking distances at the end of the front and back straights. The ground effect Williams and Alfa Romeo were also decidedly quicker through the corners, while the powerful but heavier F5000's were no match for the acceleration of the lighter and more highly developed F1 cars. Jones qualified his FW07B on pole in a time of 36.1 seconds, with Giacomelli only 0.2 seconds behind. Alfredo Costanzo was the fastest of the F5000 runners in third place, 1.8 seconds slower than Jones on the 1.609 km (1.000 mi) track. Didier Pironi qualified his Elfin MR8 in eighth place, some 4.1 seconds slower than Jones, though he was 0.3 seconds in front of temporary teammate Bowe who qualified ninth, despite the Frenchman only having driven the car once previously a few days before the race.

The fastest of the Formula Pacific cars was local star John Smith driving a Ralt RT1. Smith was surprisingly quick in the Ralt with its 1.6L 4cyl Ford engine, qualifying only 5.3 seconds behind the Formula One cars. As the team only finished the car on the morning of qualifying, Ansett Team Elfin boss Garrie Cooper did not practice the ground effect MR9 and was allowed to start from 20th and last.

== Race ==
The race was almost made infamous after Jones almost lost the race. Giacomelli was surprisingly fast and determined with the two F1s actually clashing during a frantic scrabble past some of the slower cars - Giacomelli emerged from this tussle with the lead. Jones then knuckled down to race and after regaining the lead, pulled steadily clear to win by over a lap from Giacomelli.

Four laps down at the finish, Pironi raced his Elfin steadily ahead of the local Formula 5000 racers to finish in third position and allow the imported Formula 1 drivers to clean sweep the podium.

Reliability plagued the local cars with many of the fancied drivers striking problems. In the end Alfredo Costanzo was three laps clear of the nearest domestic competitor, Chas Talbot's Lola, enough to clinch his first Australian Drivers' Championship.

Garrie Cooper drove a steady race in the ground effect MR9's first time on track and finished in seventh place, 10 laps adrift of Alan Jones.

Alan Jones set Calder Park's outright lap record during the race with a lap of 36.9 seconds (which would have placed him third on the grid). As of 2016, Jones' record still stands for the Calder Park Short Circuit (Calder was extended to 2.280 km (1.417 mi) in 1986 but still retained the original circuit as part of the re-development).

Bob Jane's gamble of bringing out the reigning World Drivers' Champion Jones (himself a native of Melbourne) and Giacomelli for the race worked as an almost capacity crowd turned up to Calder despite the 38°C heat on the day.

The race was broadcast live throughout Australia on the Nine Network with expert commentary provided by triple World Champion and former Tasman Series and 1967 Australian Grand Prix winner Jackie Stewart. He was joined in the booth by Ken Sparkes and (for a few laps mid-race) touring car star Peter Brock.

== Classification ==
Results as follows:

=== Qualifying ===
Pos	No	Driver	Car	Qual	Gap
1	27	(Australia) Alan Jones	Williams FW07B / Ford 3.0L V8	0:36.1	—
2	23	(Italy) Bruno Giacomelli	Alfa Romeo 179 / Alfa Romeo 3.0L V12	0:36.3	+0.2
3	84	(Australia) Alfredo Costanzo	Lola T430 / Chevrolet 5.0L V8	0:37.9	+1.8
4	76	(Australia) John Wright	Lola T400 / Chevrolet 5.0L V8	0:38.8	+2.7
5	4	(Australia) Jon Davison	Lola T332 / Chevrolet 5.0L V8	0:39.7	+3.6
6	10	(Australia) Rob Butcher	Lola T332 / Chevrolet 5.0L V8	0:40.0	+3.9
7	7	(Australia) Chas Talbot	Lola T332 / Chevrolet 5.0L V8	0:40.0	+3.9
8	25	(France) Didier Pironi	Elfin MR8 / Chevrolet 5.0L V8	0:40.2	+4.1
9	11	(Australia) John Bowe	Elfin MR8 / Chevrolet 5.0L V8	0:40.5	+4.4
10	17	(Australia) Mel McEwin	Matich A53 / Repco Holden 5.0L V8	0:40.8	+4.7
11	21	(Australia) Peter Edwards	Lola T332 / Chevrolet 5.0L V8	0:41.1	+5.0
12	71	(Australia) John Smith	Ralt RT1 / Ford 1.6L I4	0:41.4	+5.3
13	38	(Australia) Ivan Tighe	Chevron B37 / Chevrolet 5.0L V8	0:41.6	+5.5
14	33	(Australia) Tim Slako	Elfin MR6 / Chevrolet 5.0L V8	0:42.0	+5.9
15	8	(Australia) Ian Adams	Lola T330 / Chevrolet 5.0L V8	0:42.0	+5.9
16	16	(Australia) Barry Singleton	Gardos GL1 / Chevrolet 5.0L V8	0:42.2	+6.1
17	34	(Australia) Colin Trengove	Lola T332 / Chevrolet 5.0L V8	0:42.3	+6.2
18	77	(Australia) Peter Williamson	Galloway HG1 / Ford 1.6L I4	0:42.6	+6.5
19	48	(Australia) Ray Hangar	March 77B / Ford 1.6L I4	0:43.5	+7.4
20	12	(Australia) Garrie Cooper	Elfin MR9 / Chevrolet 5.0L V8	DNP	
DNA	3	(Australia) John McCormack	McLaren M23 / Repco-Leyland 5.0L V8		

=== Race ===
Pos	No	Driver	Car	Entrant	Laps	Time
1	27	(Australia) Alan Jones	Williams FW07B / Ford 3.0L V8	Alan Jones	95	1:00:16.4
2	23	(Italy) Bruno Giacomelli	Alfa Romeo 179 / Alfa Romeo 3.0L V12	Alfa Romeo	94	+ 1 Lap
3	25	(France) Didier Pironi	Elfin MR8 / Chevrolet 5.0L V8	Ansett Team Elfin	91	+ 4 Laps
4	84	(Australia) Alfredo Costanzo	Lola T430 / Chevrolet 5.0L V8	Porsche Distributors	90	+ 5 Laps
5	7	(Australia) Chas Talbot	Lola T332 / Chevrolet 5.0L V8	Chas Talbot	87	+ 8 Laps
6	10	(Australia) Rob Butcher	Lola T332 / Chevrolet 5.0L V8	Hahndorf Motor Museum	85	+ 10 Laps
7	12	(Australia) Garrie Cooper	Elfin MR9 / Chevrolet 5.0L V8	Ansett Team Elfin	85	+ 10 Laps
8	34	(Australia) Colin Trengove	Lola T332 / Chevrolet 5.0L V8	Trengove Racing	84	+ 11 Laps
9	21	(Australia) Peter Edwards	Lola T332 / Chevrolet 5.0L V8	PJ Edwards	84	+ 11 Laps
10	38	(Australia) Ivan Tighe	Chevron B37 / Chevrolet 5.0L V8	Ivan Tighe	83	+ 12 Laps
11	11	(Australia) John Bowe	Elfin MR8 / Chevrolet 5.0L V8	Ansett Team Elfin	79	+ 16 Laps
Ret	76	(Australia) John Wright	Lola T400 / Chevrolet 5.0L V8	John Wright	70	Battery
Ret	4	(Australia) Jon Davison	Lola T332 / Chevrolet 5.0L V8	Lee Seeton	68	Gearbox
Ret	8	(Australia) Ian Adams	Lola T330 / Chevrolet 5.0L V8	Ian Adams	60	Rocker
Ret	17	(Australia) Mel McEwin	Matich A53 / Repco Holden 5.0L V8	Mel McEwin	33	Clutch
Ret	77	(Australia) Peter Williamson	Galloway HG1 / Ford 1.6L I4	Peter Williamson Pty Ltd	27	Overheating
Ret	33	(Australia) Tim Slako	Elfin MR6 / Chevrolet 5.0L V8	Tim Slako	17	Water hose / Driver burned
Ret	16	(Australia) Barry Singleton	Gardos GL1 / Chevrolet 5.0L V8	Barry Singleton	6	Oil pump
Ret	71	(Australia) John Smith	Ralt RT1 / Ford 1.6L I4	Jim Smith	1	Head gasket
DNS	48	(Australia) Ray Hangar	March 77B / Ford 1.6L I4	Ray Hanger		
DNA	3	(Australia) John McCormack	McLaren M23 / Repco-Leyland 5.0L V8	John McCormack		

== Notes ==
- Pole Position: Alan Jones - 0'36.1
- Fastest Lap: Alan Jones - 0'36.9

Preceded by 1979 Australian Grand Prix	Australian Grand Prix; 1980	Succeeded by 1981 Australian Grand Prix
