= 1982 Australian Grand Prix =

- Round 8 of 8 of the 1982 Australian Drivers' Championship
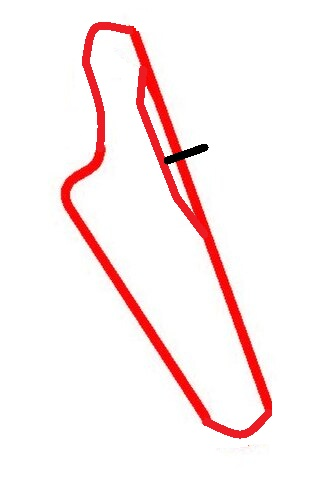

Race details
- Date: 7 November 1982
- Official name: XLVII Australian Grand Prix
- Location: Calder Park Raceway, Melbourne, Victoria
- Course: Permanent racing facility
- Course length: 1.609 km (1.000 miles)
- Distance: 100 laps, 160.9 km (100 miles)
- Weather: Sunny

Pole position
Driver	(France) Alain Prost	Ralt-Ford
- Time: 0'39.18

Fastest lap
Driver	(France) Jacques Laffite	Ralt-Ford
- Time: 0'39.62

Podium
First	(France) Alain Prost	Ralt-Ford
Second	(France) Jacques Laffite	Ralt-Ford
Third	(Brazil) Roberto Moreno	Ralt-Ford

The 1982 Australian Grand Prix was a motor race held at the Melbourne International Raceway, (now generally known as Calder Park), in Victoria, Australia on 8 November 1982.

The race, which was the 47th Australian Grand Prix, was open to racing cars complying with Australian Formula 1 regulations, which for this year included only Formula Pacific cars. It was the second Australian Grand Prix to feature only Formula Pacific cars. For the Australian-based competitors the race was also the eighth and final round of the 1982 Australian Drivers' Championship.

The race was won by Alain Prost of France driving a Ralt RT4. His subsequent victory in the 1986 Australian Grand Prix would see him secure his second straight Formula One World Championship for Drivers title and become the only driver to win the Australian Grand Prix in both its Australian domestic and World Championship formats.

The 1982 race was the first Australian Grand Prix since 1968 in which no Australian driver placed in the first three positions. The highest-placed Australian was Alfredo Costanzo who finished fifth in a Tiga FA81 Ford, thus clinching the 1982 Australian Drivers' Championship title. Costanzo was also the fastest Australian qualifier, starting from the third grid position behind the Ralt RT4 Fords of French Formula One drivers Alain Prost and Jacques Laffite.

== Classification ==
Results as follows:

=== Qualifying ===
Pos	No	Driver	Car	Qual	Gap
1	15	(France) Alain Prost	Ralt RT4 Ford	0:39.18	—
2	26	(France) Jacques Laffite	Ralt RT4 Ford	0:39.42	+0.24
3	1	(Australia) Alfredo Costanzo	Tiga FA81 Ford	0:39.59	+0.41
4	4	(Australia) John Bowe	Ralt RT4 Ford	0:39.67	+0.49
5	18	(Brazil) Nelson Piquet	Ralt RT4 Ford	0:39.67	+0.49
6	19	(Brazil) Roberto Moreno	Ralt RT4 Ford	0:39.77	+0.59
7	27	(Australia) Alan Jones	Ralt RT4 Ford	0:39.81	+0.63
8	71	(Australia) John Smith	Ralt RT4 Ford	0:39.89	+0.70
9	41	(New Zealand) David McMillan	Ralt RT4 Ford	0:39.93	+0.74
10	14	(Australia) Robert Handford	Ralt RT4 Ford	0:39.98	+0.79
11	2	(Australia) Andrew Miedecke	Ralt RT4 Ford	0:39.99	+0.80
12	9	(Australia) Graham Watson	Ralt RT4 Ford	0:40.01	+0.83
13	8	(Australia) Richard Davison	Ralt RT4 Ford	0:40.07	+0.89
14	20	(Australia) Lucio Cesario	Ralt RT4 Ford	0:40.09	+0.91
15	64	(Australia) Phillip Revell	Ralt RT4 Ford	0:40.16	+0.98
16	25	(New Zealand) Paul Radisich	Ralt RT4 Ford	0:40.30	+1.12
17	3	(Australia) Charlie O'Brien	Ralt RT4 Ford	0:40.36	+1.18
18	12	(Australia) Doug MacArthur	Ralt RT4 Ford	0:40.41	+1.23
19	10	(Australia) Neil Crang	Tiga FA82 Ford	0:41.25	+2.07
20	7	(Australia) Peter Williamson	Toleman TA860 Toyota	0:41.25	+2.07
21	74	(Australia) Chris Hocking	Cheetah Mk.8 Ford	0:41.25	+2.07
22	23	(Australia) Willy Stobart	Ralt RT4 Ford	0:41.27	+2.09
23	78	(Australia) Brian Sampson	Cheetah Mk.8 Ford	0:41.38	+2.20
24	16	(Australia) Bob Creasy	Ralt RT4 Ford	0:41.65	+2.47
25 {1)	24	(Australia) Ray Hangar	Ralt RT4 Ford	0:42.10	+2.92
26 {1)	13	(Australia) Brett Fisher	Ralt RT1 Ford	0:43.87	+4.69

Note 1: Hanger and Fisher were listed as reserves for the race however Hanger was allowed to start after Jones withdrew during the warm-up laps.

=== Race ===
Pos	No	Driver	Car	Entrant	Laps	Time	Points
1	15	(France) Alain Prost	Ralt RT4 Ford	Melbourne International Raceway	100	1h 07m 18.65s	
2	26	(France) Jacques Laffite	Ralt RT4 Ford	Melbourne International Raceway	100	1h 07m 33.97s	
3	19	(Brazil) Roberto Moreno	Ralt RT4 Ford	Goold Motorsport	100	1h 07m 43.48s	
4	41	(New Zealand) David McMillan	Ralt RT4 Ford	D McMillan	99		
5	1	(Australia) Alfredo Costanzo	Tiga FA81 Ford	Porsche Cars Australia	99		9
6	2	(Australia) Andrew Miedecke	Ralt RT4 Ford	A Miedecke	99		6
7	4	(Australia) John Bowe	Ralt RT4 Ford	Chris Leach Racing	99		4
8	14	(Australia) Robert Handford	Ralt RT4 Ford	R Handford	98		3
9	71	(Australia) John Smith	Ralt RT4 Ford	J Smith	98		2
10	64	(Australia) Phillip Revell	Ralt RT4 Ford	Aub Revell	98		1
11	8	(Australia) Richard Davison	Ralt RT4 Ford	Clive Milis Motors Pty Ltd	98		
12	12	(Australia) Doug MacArthur	Ralt RT4 Ford	DM MacArthur	97		
13	10	(Australia) Neil Crang	Tiga FA82 Ford	N Crang	96		
14	74	(Australia) Chris Hocking	Cheetah Mk.8 Ford	C Hocking	96		
15	78	(Australia) Brian Sampson	Cheetah Mk.8 Ford	B Sampson	96		
16	25	(New Zealand) Paul Radisich	Ralt RT4 Ford	P Radisich	93		
17	16	(Australia) Bob Creasy	Ralt RT4 Ford	B Creasy	91		
18	24	(Australia) Ray Hangar	Ralt RT4 Ford	R Hanger	90		
Ret	20	(Australia) Lucio Cesario	Ralt RT4 Ford	L Cesario	51	lost fourth gear	
Ret	18	(Brazil) Nelson Piquet	Ralt RT4 Ford	Goold Motorsport	35	accident	
Ret	9	(Australia) Graham Watson	Ralt RT4 Ford	Graham Watson Motor Racing Pty Ltd	34	accident	
Ret	7	(Australia) Peter Williamson	Toleman TA860 Toyota	National Panasonic (Australia) Pty Ltd	33	accident	
Ret	3	(Australia) Charlie O'Brien	Ralt RT4 Ford	C O'Brien	27	head gasket	
Ret	23	(Australia) Willy Stobart	Ralt RT4 Ford	W Stobart	26	brakes / handling	
DNS	27	(Australia) Alan Jones	Ralt RT4 Ford	Alan Jones Racing		flywheel (warm up laps)	
DNQ	13	(Australia) Brett Fisher	Ralt RT1 Ford	Paul Liston			

== Notes ==
- Pole position: Alain Prost – 0'39.18
- Fastest lap: Jacques Laffite – 0'39.62 (146.29 km/h, 90.90 mph) New Formula Pacific lap record.
- Winner's average speed: 143.6 km/h (89.18 mph)

Preceded by 1981 Australian Grand Prix	Australian Grand Prix; 1982	Succeeded by 1983 Australian Grand Prix
