= 1984 Australian Grand Prix =

- Formula Mondial race
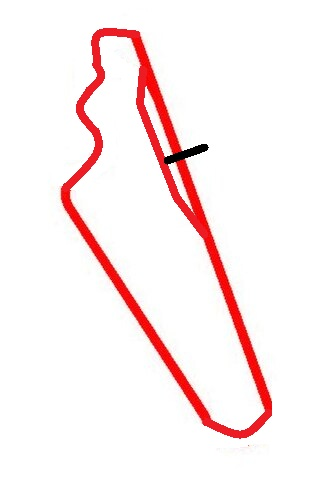

Race details
- Date: 18 November 1984
- Official name: XLIX Dunlop Tyres Australian Grand Prix
- Location: Calder Park Raceway, Melbourne, Victoria
- Course: Permanent racing facility
- Course length: 1.609 km (1.000 miles)
- Distance: 100 laps, 160.9 km (100 miles)
- Weather: Sunny

Pole position
Driver	(Brazil) Roberto Moreno	Ralt-Ford
- Time: 0'40.45

Fastest lap
Driver	(Austria) Niki Lauda	Ralt-Ford
- Time: 0'41.27

Podium
First	(Brazil) Roberto Moreno	Ralt-Ford
Second	(Finland) Keke Rosberg	Ralt-Ford
Third	(Italy) Andrea de Cesaris	Ralt-Ford

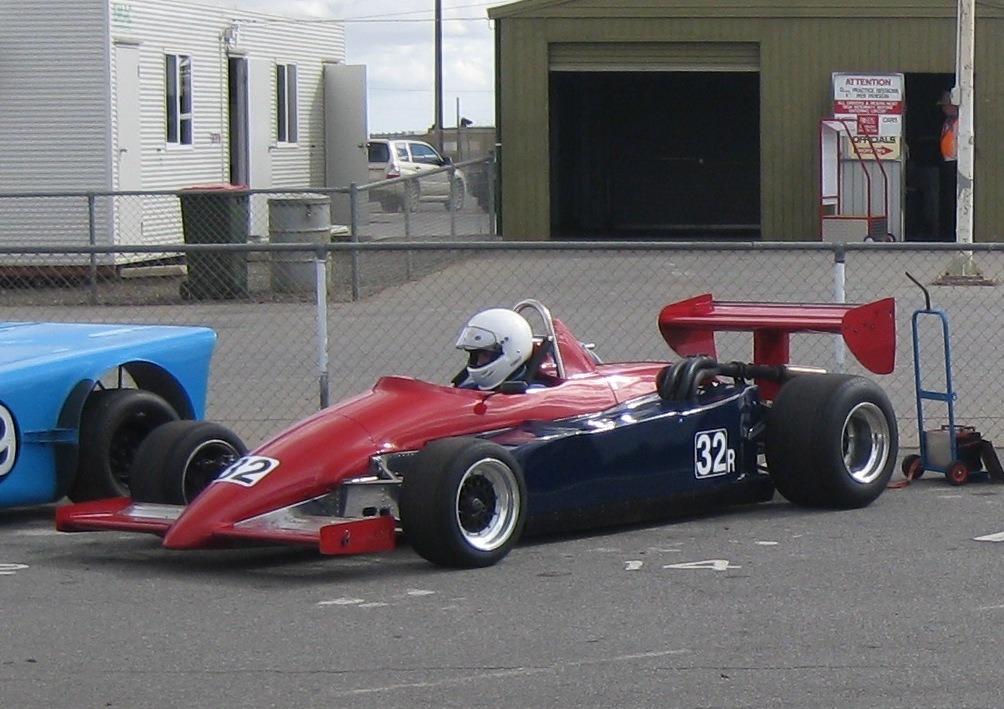
Roberto Moreno won the race driving a Ralt RT4, similar to the example pictured above

The 1984 Australian Grand Prix was a race for Formula Mondial racing cars, held at Calder Park Raceway in Victoria, Australia on 18 November 1984. It was contested over a distance of 160.9 km (100 laps x 1.609 km) or an even 100 miles.

The race was the forty ninth Australian Grand Prix, the fifth to be held at Calder and the fourth to be held specifically for Formula Pacific / Formula Mondial racing cars. It was the last Australian Grand Prix to be held prior to the race becoming a round of the Formula One World Championship the following year.

== Race ==
The race was won by Brazilian driver Roberto Moreno, his third win during the four years in which the Grand Prix was held for the Formula Pacific / Formula Mondial category. While Formula Mondial would continue as the premier Australian open-wheel racing category for another two years, and would not be completely replaced until the creation of Formula Holden in 1989, this was the last year it would be associated with the Australian Grand Prix, as the race was granted Formula One World Championship status from 1985 and would be contested only by Formula One cars. In many ways, Australian domestic open-wheel racing would be deprived of a signature race by the arrival of Formula One, a situation that continues as of 2015.

The trend of the race organiser Bob Jane of importing overseas star racers (mostly Formula One drivers) continued. In addition to Moreno, the starters for the 1984 race included 1975, 1977 and 1984 F1 World Champion Niki Lauda, 1982 F1 World Champion Keke Rosberg, as well as Formula One drivers Andrea de Cesaris and François Hesnault.

De Cesaris started from an unguarded pit lane ahead of the field and led the race briefly, although official lap scoring started his race when he started his second lap. 1984 Australian Drivers' Championship winner and front row qualifier, John Bowe, led the race until lap 9 when overtaken by Moreno after a loose spark plug lead caused his 1.6-litre Ford engine to misfire. He was forced to pit for a replacement plug lead. Poor starts by Moreno's teammate for the race, Niki Lauda, Rosberg and de Cesaris were overcome as the race progressed. Both keen aviators, Lauda and Rosberg had actually spent most of practice and qualifying attending an air show at the nearby Essendon Airport, with newly crowned World Champion Lauda stating that he was in Australia mostly for a holiday and just to get away from Europe. Hesnault, Bowe's teammate, retired after a bump with Bruce Connolly. Lauda and Rosberg diced briefly for third, before Rosberg and Terry Ryan clashed when Ryan was being lapped, with the closely following Lauda also colliding with Ryan, the result being that Rosberg and Ryan were able to continue while Lauda was out. Bowe dropped down the field with electrical problems. First Rosberg then de Cesaris caught and overtook the Tiga FA81/83 of Alfredo Costanzo to fill the podium positions. Bowe finished sixth behind David McMillan.

The Ralt RT4 was the choice of car for three-quarters of the field, with 18 of the 24 starters driving one. Other cars included Costanzo's Tiga FA81/83, two Cheetah Mk.8's, a Kaditcha FA82A, a Liston BF2 and a Dart 83M. All cars were powered by the 1.6-litre Ford BDA 4 cylinder engine. Touring car driver Peter Williamson was entered in a Toyota powered Toleman TG860, but a crash in early practice that damaged the car saw him announce his retirement from open wheel racing. Consequently, the Toleman was withdrawn from the meeting.

Due largely to the Australian Grand Prix becoming a round of the Formula One World Championship from 1985, John Bowe became the last Australian driver to lead an AGP until Mark Webber led lap 21 of the 2006 Australian Grand Prix in a Williams FW28-Cosworth. With Moreno taking the lead from Bowe on lap 9 of the race, it would be a total of 1,504 race laps before Webber would next put an Australian in the lead of an Australian Grand Prix.

== Classification ==
Results as follows:

=== Qualifying ===
Pos	No	Driver	Car	Qual	Gap
1	19	(Brazil) Roberto Moreno	Ralt RT4 Ford	0:40.45	—
2	4	(Australia) John Bowe	Ralt RT4 Ford	0:40.66	+0.21
3	1	(Australia) Alfredo Costanzo	Tiga FA81/83 Ford	0:40.68	+0.23
4	9	(Finland) Keke Rosberg	Ralt RT4/85 Ford	0:40.83	+0.38
5	8	(Italy) Andrea de Cesaris	Ralt RT4/85 Ford	0:40.86	+0.41
6	5	(France) François Hesnault	Ralt RT4 Ford	0:41.17	+0.72
7	30	(Australia) Lucio Cesario	Ralt RT4 Ford	0:41.33	+0.88
8	6	(Australia) Richard Davison	Ralt RT4 Ford	0:41.45	+1.00
9	21	(Australia) Keith McClelland	Ralt RT4 Ford	0:41.75	+1.30
10	51	(Australia) Bruce Connolly	Ralt RT4 Ford	0:41.85	+1.40
11	41	(New Zealand) Dave McMillan	Ralt RT4 Ford	0:41.89	+1.44
12	17	(New Zealand) Paul Radisich	Dart 83M Ford	0:41.98	+1.53
13	74	(Australia) Chris Hocking	Ralt RT4 Ford	0:42.09	+1.64
14	22	(Australia) Peter Hopwood	Ralt RT4/85 Ford	0:42.10	+1.65
15	36	(Australia) Terry Ryan	Ralt RT4 Ford	0:42.13	+1.68
16	25	(Australia) Peter Macrow	Cheetah Mk.8 Ford	0:42.13	+1.68
17	13	(Australia) Brett Fisher	Liston BF2 Ford	0:42.33	+1.88
18	78	(Australia) Brian Sampson	Cheetah Mk.8 Ford	0:42.47	+2.02
19	16	(Australia) Bob Creasy	Ralt RT4 Ford	0:42.62	+2.17
20	18	(Austria) Niki Lauda	Ralt RT4/85 Ford	0:42.68	+2.23
21	40	(Australia) Chas Talbot	Ralt RT4 Ford	0:42.74	+2.29
22	15	(New Zealand) Tom Brickley	Kaditcha FA82A Ford	0:43.15	+2.70
23	26	(New Zealand) Neil Cunningham	Ralt RT4 Ford	0:43.86	+3.41
24	58	(Australia) Peter Jones	Ralt RT4 Ford	0:44.03	+3.58
25	7	(Australia) Peter Williamson	Toleman TG860 Toyota	DNP	

=== Race ===
Pos	No	Driver	Car	Entrant	Laps	Time
1	19	(Brazil) Roberto Moreno	Ralt RT4 Ford	Goold Motorsport	100	1 h 10 min 51.39 s
2	9	(Finland) Keke Rosberg	Ralt RT4/85 Ford	Ralt Australia	100	1 h 11 min 20.97 s
3	8	(Italy) Andrea de Cesaris	Ralt RT4/85 Ford	Ralt Australia	100	1 h 11 min 27.63 s
4	1	(Australia) Alfredo Costanzo	Tiga FA81/83 Ford	Porsche Cars Australia	99	
5	41	(New Zealand) Dave McMillan	Ralt RT4 Ford	D. McMillan	99	
6	4	(Australia) John Bowe	Ralt RT4/84 Ford	Chris Leach Ent.	99	
7	6	(Australia) Richard Davison	Ralt RT4 Ford	Richard Davison	98	
8	51	(Australia) Bruce Connolly	Ralt RT4 Ford	B. Connolly	98	
9	78	(Australia) Brian Sampson	Cheetah Mk.8 Ford	B. Sampson	97	
10	16	(Australia) Bob Creasy	Ralt RT4 Ford	R. W. Creasy	93	
11	13	(Australia) Brett Fisher	Liston BF2 Ford	Brett Fisher	93	
12	25	(Australia) Peter Macrow	Cheetah Mk.8 Ford	Repco Engine Parts	91	
13	21	(Australia) Keith McClelland	Ralt RT4 Ford	The Menage Racing Team	82	
Ret	15	(New Zealand) Tom Brickley	Kaditcha FA82A Ford	Don Hewitt	75	Crash
Ret	36	(Australia) Terry Ryan	Ralt RT4 Ford	Terry Ryan Auto Services	73	spun / stalled
Ret	26	(New Zealand) Neil Cunningham	Ralt RT4 Ford	N. Cunningham	63	wheel bearing
Ret	74	(Australia) Chris Hocking	Ralt RT4 Ford	C. Hocking	45	half shaft
Ret	58	(Australia) Peter Jones	Ralt RT4 Ford	Recar Racing Pty. Ltd.	43	gearbox
Ret	18	(Austria) Niki Lauda	Ralt RT4/85 Ford	Goold Motorsport	41	collision / damage
Ret	40	(Australia) Chas Talbot	Ralt RT4 Ford	Chas Talbot	27	head gasket
Ret	5	(France) François Hesnault	Ralt RT4 Ford	Chris Leach Ent.	20	collision / steering
Ret	17	(New Zealand) Paul Radisich	Dart 83M Ford	P. Radisich	7	engine
Ret	30	(Australia) Lucio Cesario	Ralt RT4 Ford	Porsche Cars Australia	0	Brakes
Ret	22	(Australia) Peter Hopwood	Ralt RT4/85 Ford	The Menage Racing Team	0	collision / broken wheel
DNS	7	(Australia) Peter Williamson	Toleman TG860 Toyota	Peter Williamson Toyota	0	accident

- Winner's race time: 1 h 10 min 51.39 s
- Winner's average speed: 136.33 km/h (74.71 mph)
- Fastest lap: Niki Lauda: 41.27 s, 140.4 km/h (87.3 mph)

Preceded by 1983 Australian Grand Prix	Australian Grand Prix; 1984	Succeeded by 1985 Australian Grand Prix
