= 1981 Australian Grand Prix =

- Formula Pacific race
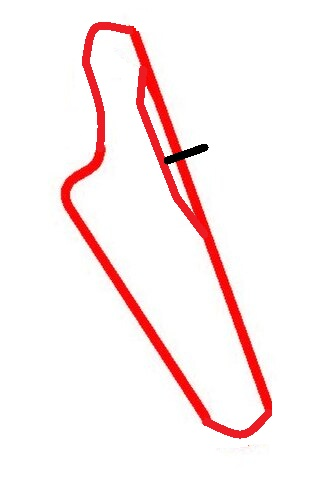

Race details
- Date: 8 November 1981
- Official name: XLVI National Panasonic Australian Grand Prix
- Location: Calder Park Raceway, Melbourne, Victoria
- Course: Permanent racing facility
- Course length: 1.609 km (1.000 miles)
- Distance: 100 laps, 160.9 km (100 miles)
- Weather: Sunny

Pole position
Driver	(Brazil) Roberto Moreno	Ralt-Ford
- Time: 0'39.2

Fastest lap
Driver	(Brazil) Roberto Moreno	Ralt-Ford
- Time: 0'39.8

Podium
First	(Brazil) Roberto Moreno	Ralt-Ford
Second	(Brazil) Nelson Piquet	Ralt-Ford
Third	(Australia) Geoff Brabham	Ralt-Ford

The 1981 Australian Grand Prix was a Formula Pacific motor race held at Calder Park Raceway in Victoria, Australia on 8 November 1981.

It was the forty sixth Australian Grand Prix and the first to be restricted to Formula Pacific racing cars. It was the first AGP since 1968 to feature two or more current or past World Drivers' Champions with reigning 1981 World Champion Nelson Piquet of Brazil and Australia's 1980 World Champion Alan Jones both in the field.

The race was won by 22-year-old Roberto Moreno by over a lap from Nelson Piquet with Australian Geoff Brabham finishing third. The top three drivers all drove Ralt RT4's (13 of the 20 starters were in fact driving the 1.6L Ford powered RT4's). To actually be able to compete in the Grand Prix Moreno needed five endorsements before the race to be able to obtain his FIA Super Licence, the first endorsement coming from Calder Park Clerk of Course Ken Smith.

Defending race winner Alan Jones failed to finish after transmission failure in his RT4 six laps from the finish while in second place. The first resident Australian driver home was another ex-Formula One driver and future touring car star Larry Perkins who finished fourth, one lap behind Moreno.

== Classification ==
Results as follows:

=== Qualifying ===
Pos	No	Driver	Car	Qual	Gap
1	19	(Brazil) Roberto Moreno	Ralt RT4 Ford	0:39.2	—
2	27	(Australia) Alan Jones	Ralt RT4 Ford	0:39.2	+0.0
3	9	(Brazil) Nelson Piquet	Ralt RT4 Ford	0:39.3	+0.1
4	4	(Australia) John Bowe	Ralt RT4 Ford	0:39.6	+0.4
5	62	(Australia) Bruce Allison	Ralt RT4 Ford	0:39.8	+0.6
6	26	(France) Jacques Laffite	Ralt RT4 Ford	0:39.8	+0.6
7	12	(Australia) Geoff Brabham	Ralt RT4 Ford	0:39.9	+0.7
8	71	(Australia) John Smith	Ralt RT4 Ford	0:39.9	+0.7
9	3	(Australia) Larry Perkins	Ralt RT4 Ford	0:40.0	+0.8
10	6	(United Kingdom) Ray Mallock	Ralt RT4 Ford	0:40.2	+1.0
11	5	(Australia) Andrew Miedecke	Ralt RT4 Ford	0:40.2	+1.0
12	84	(Australia) Alfredo Costanzo	Tiga FA81 Ford	0:40.3	+1.1
13	2	(Australia) Charlie O'Brien	Ralt RT4 Ford	0:40.4	+1.2
14	18	(New Zealand) David Oxton	Ralt RT4 Ford	0:40.6	+1.4
15	16	(Australia) Lucio Cesario	Ralt RT3 Volkswagen Golf	0:40.7	+1.5
16	83	(Australia) Peter Larner	Kaditcha Ford	0:40.7	+1.5
17	7	(Australia) Peter Williamson	Toleman TA860 Toyota	0:40.9	+1.7
18	77	(Australia) Mike Quinn	Galloway HG1 Ford	0:41.4	+2.2
19	11	(Australia) Ron Barnacle	Ralt RT1 Ford	0:41.8	+2.6
20	48	(Australia) Ray Hangar	March 77B Ford	0:42.5	+3.3
21	36	(Australia) Bob Creasy	Birrana 273 Ford	0:43.1	+3.9

=== Race ===
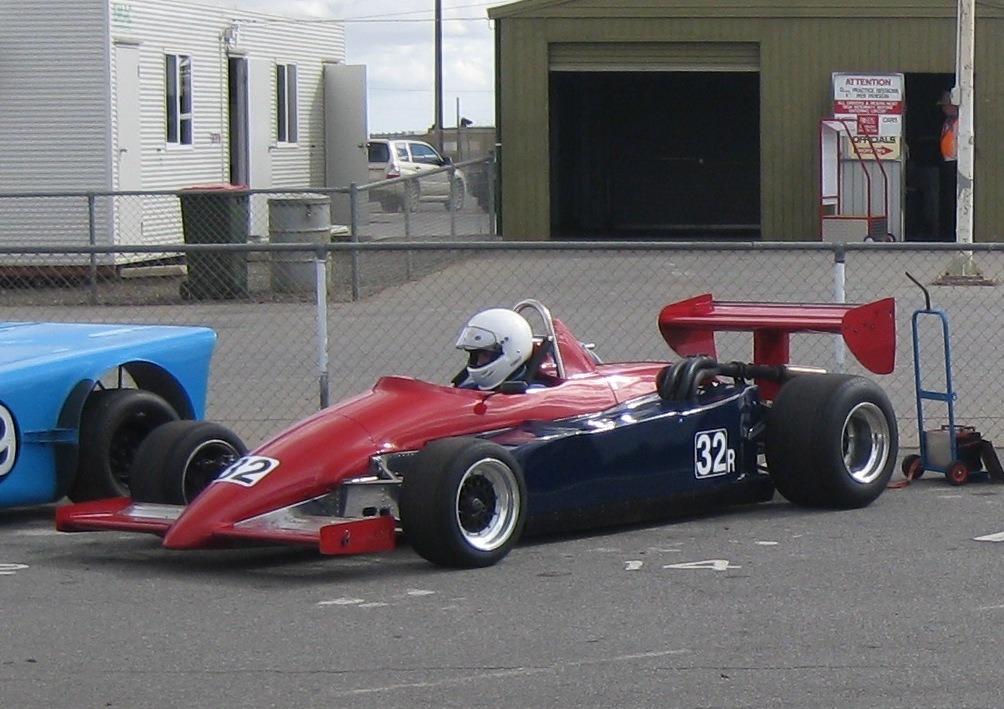
Roberto Moreno won the race driving a Ralt RT4 similar to that pictured above

Pos	No.	Driver	Car	Entrant	Laps	Time
1	19	(Brazil) Roberto Moreno	Ralt RT4 Ford	Graham Watson Motor Racing Pty Ltd	100	1h 07m 39.2s
2	9	(Brazil) Nelson Piquet	Ralt RT4 Ford	Graham Watson Motor Racing Pty Ltd	99	
3	12	(Australia) Geoff Brabham	Ralt RT4 Ford	G Brabham	99	
4	3	(Australia) Larry Perkins	Ralt RT4 Ford	L Perkins	99	
5	5	(Australia) Andrew Miedecke	Ralt RT4 Ford	AW Miedecke	99	
6	18	(New Zealand) David Oxton	Ralt RT4 Ford	Oxton Motors	98	
7	6	(United Kingdom) Ray Mallock	Ralt RT4 Ford	Cliff Smith Racing	98	
8	62	(Australia) Bruce Allison	Ralt RT4 Ford	B Allison	98	
9	2	(Australia) Charlie O'Brien	Ralt RT4 Ford	Citizen Watches Australia	98	
10	84	(Australia) Alfredo Costanzo	Tiga FA81 Ford	Porsche Cars Australia	97	
11	83	(Australia) Peter Larner	Kaditcha Ford	Paul England	97	
12	71	(Australia) John Smith	Ralt RT4 Ford	OSCL	96	
13	11	(Australia) Ron Barnacle	Ralt RT1 Ford	Nissalco Garage Equipment	90	
14	48	(Australia) Ray Hangar	March 77B Ford	R Hanger	87	
Ret	27	(Australia) Alan Jones	Ralt RT4 Ford	Theodore Racing	93	transmission
Ret	26	(France) Jacques Laffite	Ralt RT4 Ford	J Laffite	43	oil line
Ret	7	(Australia) Peter Williamson	Toleman TA860 Toyota	Toyota Dealer Team	40	accident
Ret	4	(Australia) John Bowe	Ralt RT4 Ford	Chris Leach Racing	15	water pump belt
Ret	16	(Australia) Lucio Cesario	Ralt RT3 Volkswagen Golf	Formula One Automotive	10	broken valve spring
Ret	36	(Australia) Bob Creasy	Birrana 273 Ford	R Creasy	6	spin
DNS	77	(Australia) Mike Quinn	Galloway HG1 Ford	Peter Williamson Pty Ltd		gearbox input shaft

== Notes ==
- Pole position: Roberto Moreno – 0'39.2
- Fastest lap: Roberto Moreno – 0'39.8 (145.6 km/h, 90.5 mph)
- Winner's average speed: 142.8 km/h, 88.7 mph

Preceded by 1980 Australian Grand Prix	Australian Grand Prix; 1981	Succeeded by 1982 Australian Grand Prix
