= National Panasonic Series =

Australian motor racing competition

The National Panasonic Series was an Australian motor racing competition for Formula Pacific cars. The series, which was sponsored by National Panasonic, was contested in 1981 and 1982.

== Series winners ==
Year	Driver	Car
1981	Bruce Allison	Ralt RT4
1982	Charlie O'Brien	Ralt RT4
