= 1980 Australian Drivers' Championship =

Motor racing competition

Seasons
- ← 1979 1981 →

The 1980 Australian Drivers' Championship was a CAMS sanctioned Australian motor racing title for drivers of Australian Formula 1 racing cars. The winner of the championship, which was the 24th Australian Drivers' Championship, was awarded the 1980 CAMS Gold Star.

The championship was won by Alfredo Costanzo driving a Lola T430 Chevrolet.

== Calendar ==
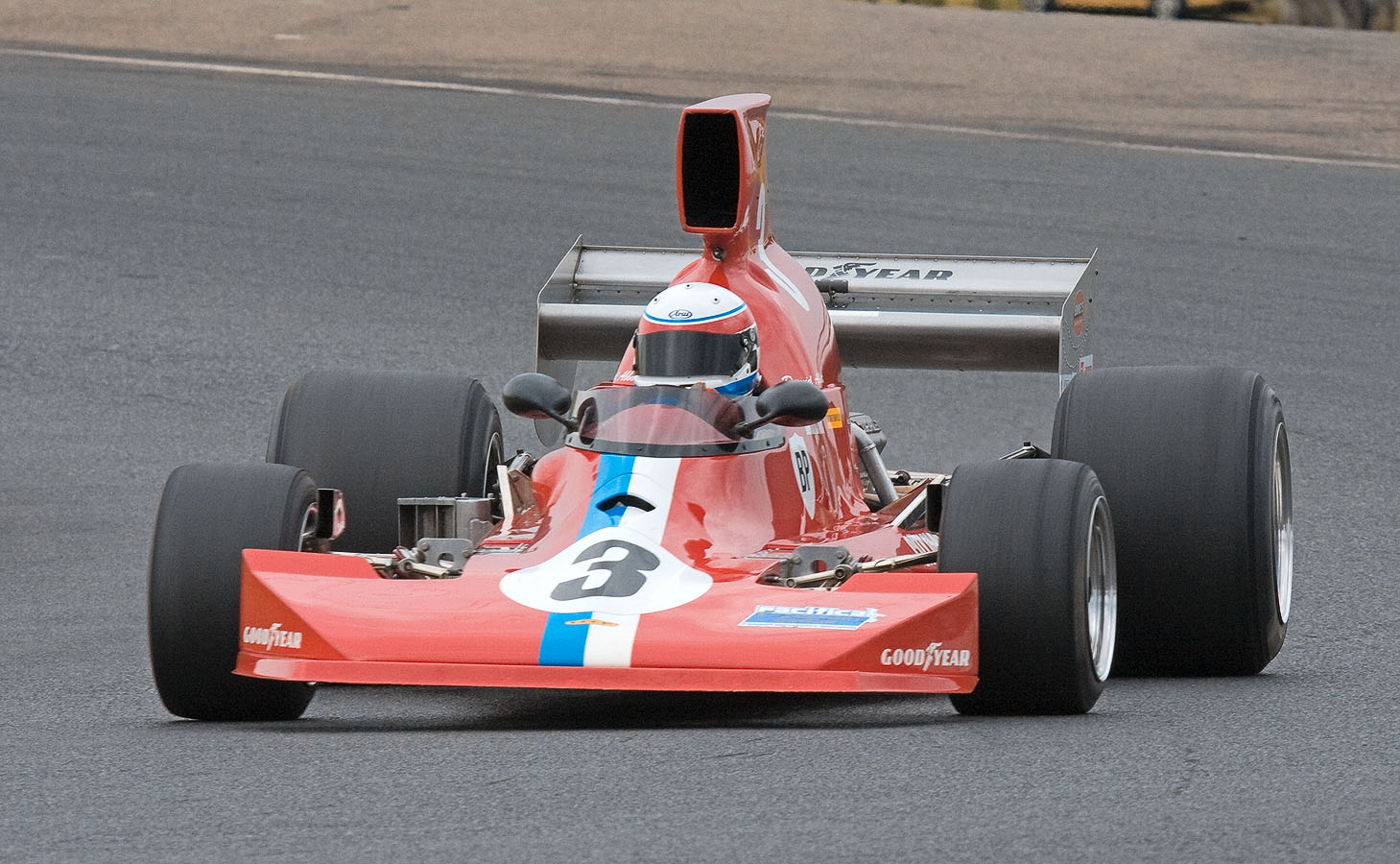
Alfredo Costanzo won the championship driving a Lola T430 similar to the car pictured above

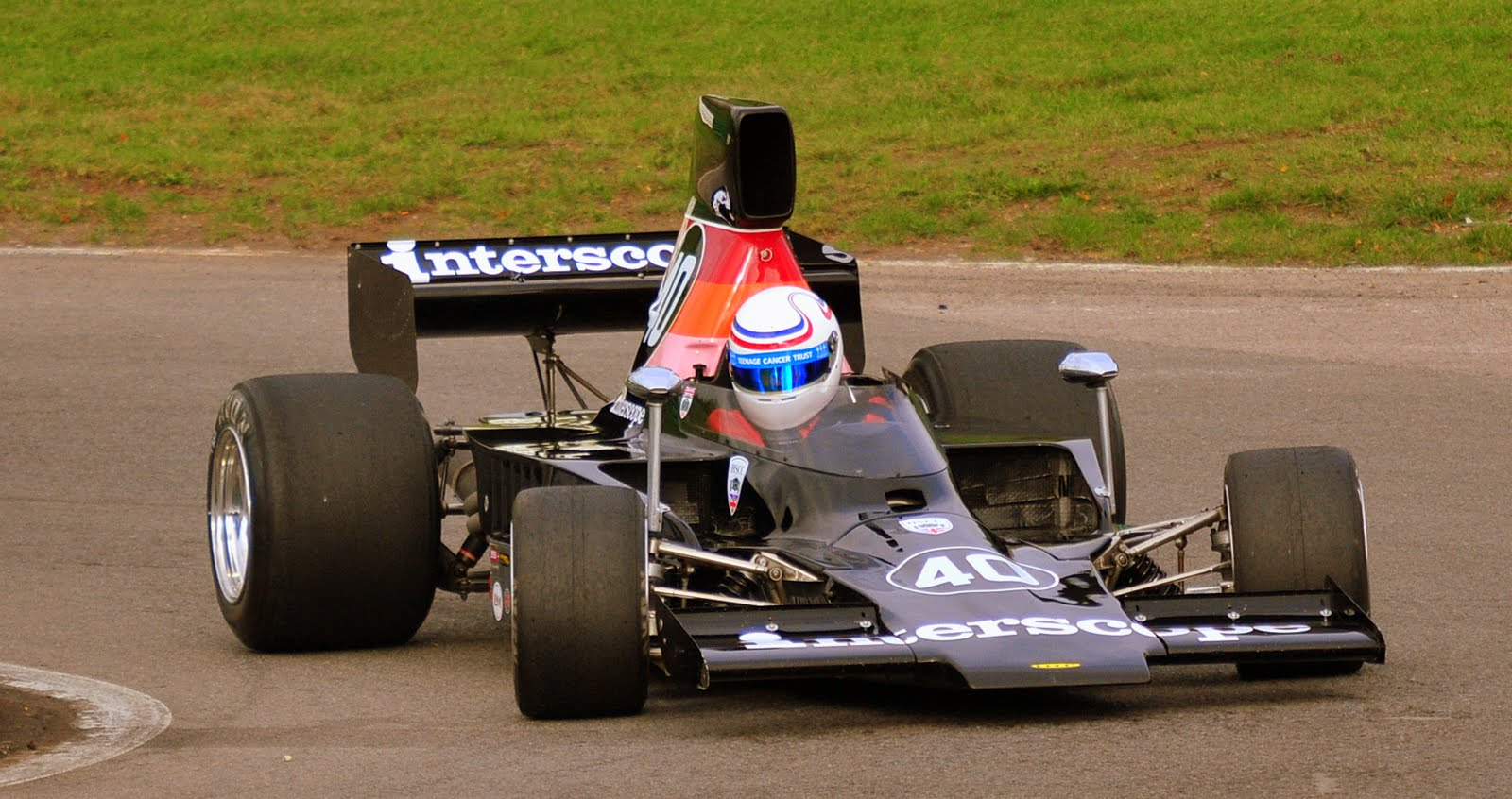
Jon Davison placed second with a Lola T332 similar to the example above

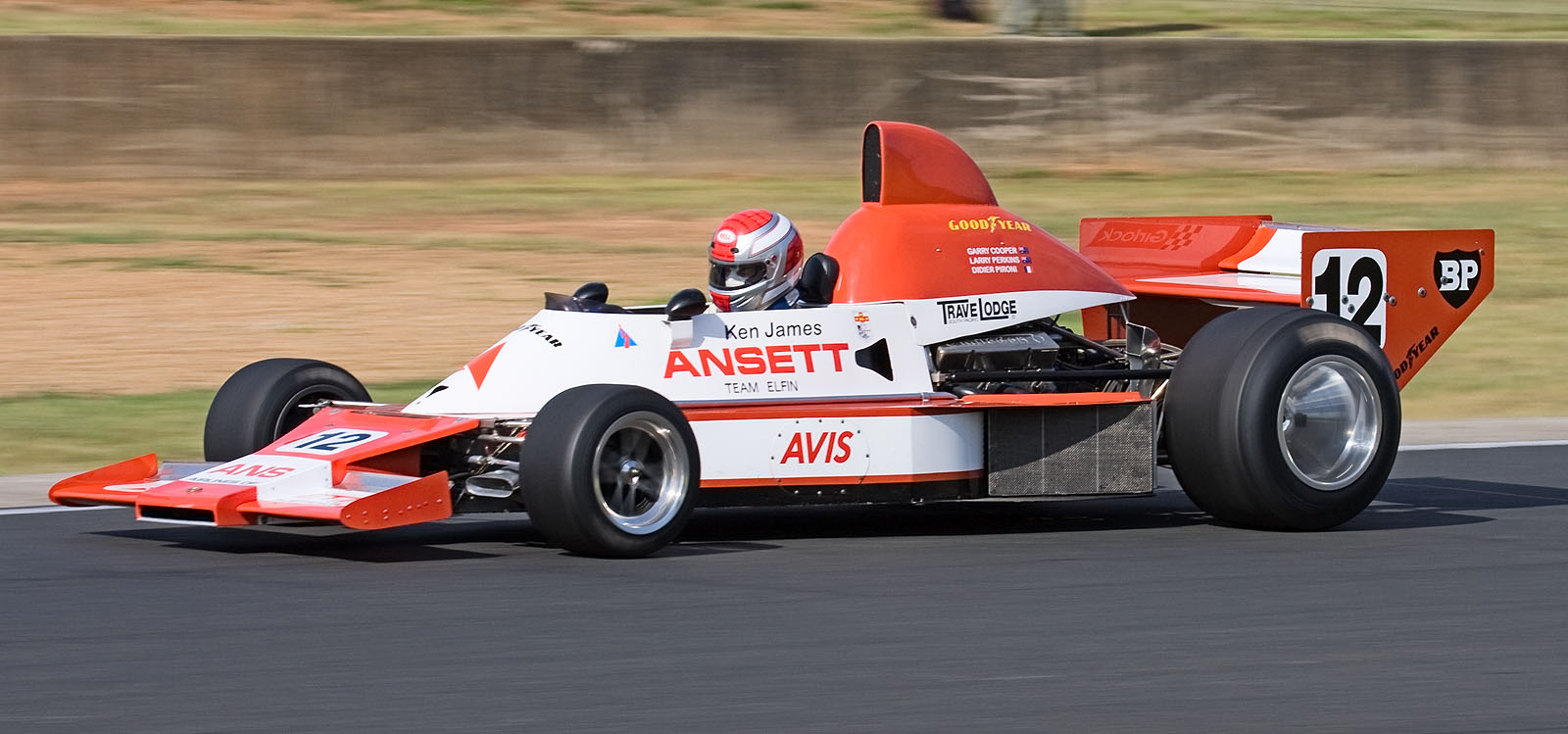
John Bowe placed third driving an Elfin MR8 similar to the example pictured

The title was contested over an eight-round series with one race per round.

| Round | Race name | Circuit | State | Date | Winning driver | Car |
| 1 | | Sandown Park | Victoria | 24 February | John Wright | Lola T400 Chevrolet |
| 2 | | Baskerville | Tasmania | March | Jon Davison | Lola T332 Chevrolet |
| 3 | | Symmons Plains | Tasmania | 23 March | John Bowe | Elfin MR8 Chevrolet |
| 4 | | Oran Park | New South Wales | 4 May | John Bowe | Elfin MR8 Chevrolet |
| 5 | | Lakeside | Queensland | 20 July | Jon Davison | Lola T332 Chevrolet |
| 6 | | Sandown Park | Victoria | 14 September | Alfredo Costanzo | Lola T430 Chevrolet |
| 7 | Rose City Trophy | Winton | Victoria | 26 October | Alfredo Costanzo | Lola T430 Chevrolet |
| 8 | Australian Grand Prix | Calder Raceway | Victoria | 16 November | Alan Jones | Williams FW07B Ford |

== Class Structure ==
Australian Formula 1, in its 1980 incarnation, catered for cars complying with any one of the following three Formulae:

- Formula 5000
- International Formula One
- Formula Pacific

For championship points allocation purposes, cars competed in two classes:

- Over 1600cc: Open to "Formula 5000" cars and "International Formula One" cars
- Under 1600cc: Open to "Formula Pacific" cars

== Points system ==
Championship points were awarded on a 9-6-4-3-2-1 basis to the top six Australian license holders in each class at each round. Bonus points were awarded on a 4-3-2-1 basis to the top four Australian license holders at each round, regardless of class.

== Results ==
| Position | Driver | Car | Entrant | San | Bas | Sym | Ora | Lak | San | Win | Cal | Total |
|---|---|---|---|---|---|---|---|---|---|---|---|---|
| 1 | Alfredo Costanzo | Lola T430 Chevrolet | Porsche Distributors | - | 2 | 9 | - | 8 | 13 | 13 | 13 | 58 |
| 2 | Jon Davison | Lola T332 Chevrolet | Lee Seeton | 9 | 13 | 6 | 6 | 13 | 2 | 3 | - | 52 |
| 3 | John Bowe | Elfin MR8 Chevrolet | Ansett Team Elfin | 4 | 9 | 13 | 13 | 3 | - | 9 | - | 51 |
| 4 | Chas Talbot | Lola T332 Chevrolet | Chas Talbot | 6 | 4 | - | - | - | 9 | 5 | 9 | 33 |
| 5 | John Wright | Lola T400 Chevrolet | John Wright | 13 | 6 | - | 9 | - | - | - | - | 28 |
| 6 | Ray Hanger | March 77B Ford | Ray Hanger | - | - | - | 4 | 6 | 9 | 4 | - | 23 |
| 7 | Peter Williamson | Galloway Ford | Peter Williamson Pty Ltd | - | - | - | - | 12 | - | - | - | 12 |
| 7 | Rob Butcher | Lola T332 Chevrolet | Hahndorf Motor Museum | - | - | - | - | - | 6 | - | 6 | 12 |
| 9 | Paul Hamilton | Elfin 600 | Paul Hamilton | - | - | - | 9 | 2 | - | - | - | 11 |
| 9 | John Smith | Ralt RT1 | John Smith | - | - | - | - | - | - | 11 | - | 11 |
| 11 | Clive Millis | Elfin 700 | | - | 9 | - | - | - | - | - | - | 9 |
| 11 | Andrew Newton | Elfin 700 | | - | - | 9 | - | - | - | - | - | 9 |
| 11 | Greg Doidge | Matich A53 | Greg Doidge | 1 | - | 4 | 4 | - | - | - | - | 9 |
| 14 | Dave Cooper | Elfin 700 | | - | 6 | - | - | - | - | - | - | 6 |
| 14 | Mike Stack | Cheetah | | - | - | - | 6 | - | - | - | - | 6 |
| 14 | Gary Cosser | Bowin P6 Ford | | - | - | - | - | - | - | 6 | - | 6 |
| 14 | Peter Middleton | Elfin MR8 Chevrolet | P Middleton | 2 | - | - | - | - | 4 | - | - | 6 |
| 18 | Ivan Tighe | Chevron B37 Chevrolet | Ivan Tighe | - | - | - | - | 5 | - | - | - | 5 |
| 19 | Bob Power | Kaditcha | Bob Power | - | - | - | - | 4 | - | - | - | 4 |
| 20 | Peter Bull | Elfin | Peter Bull | - | - | - | - | 3 | - | - | - | 3 |
| 20 | Garrie Cooper | Elfin MR9 Chevrolet | Ansett Team Elfin | - | - | - | - | - | - | - | 3 | 3 |
| 20 | Ian Adams | Lola T330 Chevrolet | Ian Adams | - | - | - | - | - | 1 | 2 | - | 3 |
| 20 | Peter Edwards | Lola T332 Chevrolet | PJ Edwards | - | - | 2 | - | - | - | - | 1 | 3 |
| 20 | Mel McEwin | Matich A53 Repco Holden | Mel McEwin | 1 | 1 | 1 | - | - | - | - | - | 3 |
| 25 | Colin Trengrove | Lola T332 Chevrolet | John Silman Power Tools | - | - | - | - | - | - | - | 2 | 2 |

The following drivers were not eligible for championship points as they were not Australian license holders.

- Guy Edwards (Fittipaldi F5A), who finished second at Round 1
- Alan Jones (Williams FW07B Ford), who won the Australian Grand Prix
- Bruno Giacomelli (Alfa Romeo 179), who finished second in the Australian Grand Prix
- Didier Pironi (Elfin MR8 Chevrolet), who finished third in the Australian Grand Prix
