= 1983 Australian Drivers' Championship =

Motor racing competition

Seasons
- ← 1982 1984 →

The 1983 Australian Drivers' Championship was a CAMS sanctioned motor racing title open to drivers of Australian Formula 1 racing cars. The winner of the title, which was the 27th Australian Drivers' Championship, was awarded the 1983 CAMS Gold Star.

Italian born, Melbourne based driver Alfredo Costanzo won his fourth straight CAMS Gold Star driving his Tiga FA81 Ford. John Smith finished second in his Ralt RT4, including being the first Australian driver home in the final round of the championship, the Australian Grand Prix held at Melbourne's Calder Park. Port Macquarie privateer Andrew Miedecke drove his RT4 to 3rd in the championship despite only deciding to race after watching Costanzo win the first round of the series in Adelaide on television.

== Calendar ==
The championship was contested over a six-round series with each round held as a single race.

Round	Event	Circuit	Location / state	Date	Winner	Car	Team
1	Cheviot Challenge	Adelaide International Raceway	Virginia, South Australia	10 July	Alfredo Costanzo	Tiga FA81 Ford	Porsche Cars Australia
2		Lakeside	Brisbane, Queensland	23 July	Andrew Miedecke	Ralt RT4 Ford	Andrew Miedecke
3		Oran Park	Sydney, New South Wales	21 August	Alfredo Costanzo	Tiga FA81 Ford	Porsche Cars Australia
4		Sandown Park	Melbourne, Victoria	11 September	Alfredo Costanzo	Tiga FA81 Ford	Porsche Cars Australia
5	Melbourne Clutch and Brake Service Trophy	Winton	Benalla, Victoria	16 October	Alfredo Costanzo	Tiga FA81 Ford	Porsche Cars Australia
6	Australian Grand Prix	Calder Park	Melbourne, Victoria	13 November	John Smith*	Ralt RT4 Ford	John Smith

- Brazilian Roberto Moreno (Ralt RT4 Ford) won the Australian Grand Prix though he was ineligible for championship points. John Smith was the highest place domestic competitor (2nd) thus earning the maximum championship points for the round.

== Points system ==
Championship points were awarded on a 9-6-4-3-2-1 basis to the top six eligible finishers at each round. Non-resident drivers and drivers of Australian Formula 2 cars (who competed in some rounds by invitation) were not eligible to score points.

== Results ==
Position	Driver	No.	Car	Entrant	Ade.	Lak.	Ora.	San.	Win.	Cal.	Total
1	Alfredo Costanzo	1	Tiga FA81 Ford	Porsche Cars Australia	9	6	9	9	9	-	42
2	John Smith	71	Ralt RT4 Ford	John Smith	6	-	4	-	6	9	25
3	Andrew Miedecke	2	Ralt RT4 Ford	A. Miedecke	-	9	6	4	3	-	22
4	Paul Radisich	9	Ralt RT4 Ford	Watson Motor Racing Pty Ltd	4	-	3	3	4	3	17
5	Peter Macrow	25	Cheetah Mk 8 Ford	Peter Macrow	1	4	-	2	2	2	11
6	John Bowe	4	Ralt RT4 Ford	Chris Leach Racing	-	-	-	6	-	-	6
=	Alan Jones	27	Ralt RT4 Ford	Goold Motorsport	-	-	-	-	-	6	6
8	Peter Williamson	7	Toleman TG860 Toyota	Peter Williamson	2	3	-	-	-	-	5
9	Charlie O'Brien	3	Ralt RT4 Ford	C. O'Brien	-	-	-	-	-	4	4
10	Lucio Cesario	17 & 16	Ralt RT4 Ford	Lucio Cesario	3	-	-	-	-	-	3
=	Doug MacArthur	12	Ralt RT4 Ford	D. M. MacArthur	-	-	2	1	-	-	3
12	Terry Hook	15	Kaditcha AF1 Ford		-	2	-	-	-	-	2
=	Brian Sampson	78	Cheetah Mk 8 Ford	Speco Motor Improvements	-	-	1	-	1	-	2
14	David Oxton	14	Ralt RT4 Ford	Re-Car Racing	-	-	-	-	-	1	1
