= 1983 Australian Grand Prix =

- Race 6 of 6 in 1983 Australian Drivers' Championship
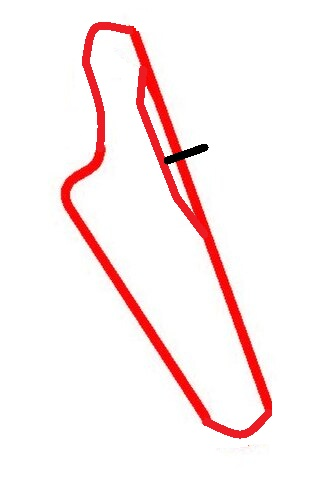

Race details
- Date: 13 November 1983
- Official name: XLVIII Australian Grand Prix
- Location: Calder Park Raceway, Melbourne, Victoria
- Course: Permanent racing facility
- Course length: 1.609 km (1.000 miles)
- Distance: 100 laps, 160.9 km (100 miles)
- Weather: Sunny

Pole position
| Driver | (Brazil) Roberto Moreno | Ralt-Ford |
- Time: 0'39.49

Fastest lap
| Driver | (Australia) Alan Jones | Ralt-Ford |
- Time: 0'39.54

Podium
| First | (Brazil) Roberto Moreno | Ralt-Ford |
| Second | (Australia) John Smith | Ralt-Ford |
| Third | (France) Jacques Laffite | Ralt-Ford |

The 1983 Australian Grand Prix was a race for Australian Formula 1 cars held at Calder Park Raceway in Victoria, Australia on 13 November 1983.

It was the forty eighth Australian Grand Prix and the fourth to be held at Calder. The race was also the sixth and final round of the 1983 Australian Drivers' Championship. The title had already been secured by Alfredo Costanzo as he had been twenty points ahead of Andrew Miedecke after winning the previous event at Winton Raceway.

Brazilian driver Roberto Moreno won his second Australian Grand Prix in three years. Local Ralt RT4 driver John Smith finished second, with French Formula One driver Jacques Laffite finishing third.

As of the 2024 Australian Grand Prix, Smith's second placing is the last time an Australian driver has finished on the podium of the Australian Grand Prix. The best finish since by an Australian was Alfie Costanzo's fourth place in 1984 and Mark Webber finishing fourth in 2012. Daniel Ricciardo finished second on the road in the 2014 Australian Grand Prix but was disqualified post race for breaching the maximum fuel limit and using an unauthorised method of measuring fuel consumption.

== Classification ==
Results as follows:

== Qualifying ==
| Pos | No | Driver | Car | Qual | Gap |
|---|---|---|---|---|---|
| 1 | 19 | (Brazil) Roberto Moreno | Ralt RT4 Ford | 0:39.49 | — |
| 2 | 1 | (Australia) Alfredo Costanzo | Tiga FA81 Ford | 0:39.65 | +0.16 |
| 3 | 71 | (Australia) John Smith | Ralt RT4 Ford | 0:39.90 | +0.41 |
| 4 | 27 | (Australia) Alan Jones | Ralt RT4 Ford | 0:39.90 | +0.41 |
| 5 | 9 | (New Zealand) Paul Radisich | Ralt RT4 Ford | 0:39.97 | +0.48 |
| 6 | 15 | (France) Jacques Laffite | Ralt RT4 Ford | 0:40.07 | +0.58 |
| 7 | 10 | (Canada) Allen Berg | Ralt RT4 Ford | 0:40.07 | +0.58 |
| 8 | 5 | (Australia) Geoff Brabham | Ralt RT4 Ford | 0:40.13 | +0.64 |
| 9 | 25 | (Australia) Peter Macrow | Cheetah Mk.8 Ford | 0:40.20 | +0.71 |
| 10 | 4 | (Australia) John Bowe | Ralt RT4 Ford | 0:40.23 | +0.74 |
| 11 | 2 | (Australia) Andrew Miedecke | Ralt RT4 Ford | 0:40.53 | +1.04 |
| 12 | 22 | (Australia) Peter Hopwood | Ralt RT4 Ford | 0:40.67 | +1.18 |
| 13 | 12 | (Australia) Doug MacArthur | Ralt RT4 Ford | 0:40.67 | +1.18 |
| 14 | 8 | (Mexico) Josele Garza | Ralt RT4 Ford | 0:40.71 | +1.22 |
| 15 | 64 | (Australia) Phillip Revell | Ralt RT4 Ford | 0:40.84 | +1.36 |
| 16 | 17 | (New Zealand) Brett Riley | Dart 83M Ford | 0:40.86 | +1.38 |
| 17 | 14 | (New Zealand) David Oxton | Ralt RT4 Ford | 0:40.87 | +1.39 |
| 18 | 7 | (Australia) Peter Williamson | Toleman TG860 Toyota | 0:41.00 | +1.51 |
| 19 | 74 | (Australia) Chris Hocking | Cheetah Mk.8 Ford | 0:41.36 | +1.87 |
| 20 | 68 | (Australia) Ian Bland | Kaditcha FA83A Ford | 0:41.53 | +2.04 |
| 21 | 3 | (Australia) Charlie O'Brien | Ralt RT4 Ford | 0:41.77 | +2.28 |
| 22 | 78 | (Australia) Brian Sampson | Cheetah Mk.8 Ford | 0:41.90 | +2.41 |
| 23 | 13 | (Australia) Brett Fisher | Liston BF2 Ford | 0:42.24 | +2.75 |
| 24 | 16 | (Australia) Bob Creasy | Ralt RT4 Ford | 0:42.76 | +3.27 |

== Race ==
| Pos | No | Driver | Car | Entrant | Laps | Time / Remarks |
|---|---|---|---|---|---|---|
| 1 | 19 | (Brazil) Roberto Moreno | Ralt RT4 Ford | Goold Motorsport | 100 | 1h 07m 25.29s |
| 2 | 71 | (Australia) John Smith | Ralt RT4 Ford | J Smith | 100 | 1h 07m 38.39s |
| 3 | 15 | (France) Jacques Laffite | Ralt RT4 Ford | Melbourne International Raceway | 100 | 1h 07m 38.55s |
| 4 | 5 | (Australia) Geoff Brabham | Ralt RT4 Ford | Melbourne International Raceway | 100 | 1h 07m 52.06s |
| 5 | 27 | (Australia) Alan Jones | Ralt RT4 Ford | Goold Motorsport | 100 | 1h 07m 58.79s |
| 6 | 3 | (Australia) Charlie O'Brien | Ralt RT4 Ford | C O'Brien | 98 | |
| 7 | 9 | (New Zealand) Paul Radisich | Ralt RT4 Ford | Watson Motor Racing | 97 | |
| 8 | 8 | (Mexico) Josele Garza | Ralt RT4 Ford | Watson Motor Racing | 97 | |
| 9 | 25 | (Australia) Peter Macrow | Cheetah Mk.8 Ford | P Macrow | 97 | |
| 10 | 14 | (New Zealand) David Oxton | Ralt RT4 Ford | Re-Car Racing | 97 | |
| 11 | 10 | (Canada) Allen Berg | Ralt RT4 Ford | Graeme Lawrence Racing | 97 | |
| 12 | 7 | (Australia) Peter Williamson | Toleman TG860 Toyota | P Williamson | 97 | |
| 13 | 4 | (Australia) John Bowe | Ralt RT4 Ford | Chris Leach Enterprises | 95 | |
| 14 | 78 | (Australia) Brian Sampson | Cheetah Mk.8 Ford | Speco Thomas | 95 | |
| 15 | 16 | (Australia) Bob Creasy | Ralt RT4 Ford | RW Creasy | 91 | |
| 16 | 68 | (Australia) Ian Bland | Kaditcha FA83A Ford | Kaditcha Racing Team | 77 | |
| Ret | 22 | (Australia) Peter Hopwood | Ralt RT4 Ford | S Webb | 84 | fuel pickup |
| Ret | 2 | (Australia) Andrew Miedecke | Ralt RT4 Ford | A Miedecke | 64 | rotor |
| Ret | 13 | (Australia) Brett Fisher | Liston BF2 Ford | P Liston | 51 | half shaft |
| Ret | 17 | (New Zealand) Brett Riley | Dart 83M Ford | Dart Racing | 33 | gear linkage |
| Ret | 64 | (Australia) Phillip Revell | Ralt RT4 Ford | A Revell | 27 | gear selection |
| Ret | 1 | (Australia) Alfredo Costanzo | Tiga FA81 Ford | Porsche Cars Australia Pty Ltd | 25 | diff |
| Ret | 12 | (Australia) Doug MacArthur | Ralt RT4 Ford | DM MacArthur | 0 | half shaft |
| DNS | 74 | (Australia) Chris Hocking | Cheetah Mk.8 Ford | C Hocking | | engine |
| DNS | 20 | (United States) Mike Rosen | Ralt RT4 Ford | Garvin Brown Racing | | accident |

== Notes ==
- Pole position: Roberto Moreno – 0'39.49
- Fastest lap: Alan Jones – 0'39.54

| Preceded by 1982 Australian Grand Prix | Australian Grand Prix; 1983 | Succeeded by 1984 Australian Grand Prix |
