= 1981 Australian Drivers' Championship =

Motor racing competition

Seasons
- ← 1980 1982 →

The 1981 Australian Drivers' Championship was a CAMS sanctioned Australian motor racing title open to racing cars complying with Australian Formula 1. It was the 25th Australian Drivers' Championship. The title winner, Alfredo Costanzo was awarded the 1981 CAMS "Gold Star".

== Schedule ==
The championship was contested over a two-round series.

Round	Circuit	Date	Format	Round winner	Car
1	Sandown Park	22 February	One race	Alfredo Costanzo	McLaren M26 Chevrolet
2	Amaroo Park	12 July	Two heats	Alfredo Costanzo	McLaren M26 Chevrolet

== Classes ==
Car competed in two classes:

- Up to 1600cc
- Over 1600cc

== Points system ==
Championship points were awarded at each round on a 9-6-4-3-2-1 basis to the first six finishers in each class. Additional points were awarded at each round on a 4-3-2-1 basis to the first four finishers outright, regardless of class.

Where rounds were contested over more than one heat, round placings were determined by allocating points to the first 14 placegetters in each heat on a 20-16-13-11-10-9-8-7-6-5-4-3-2-1 basis and then aggregating these points. Where more than one driver earned the same number of points the relevant round placing was awarded to the driver who was higher placed in the last heat.

== Championship results ==
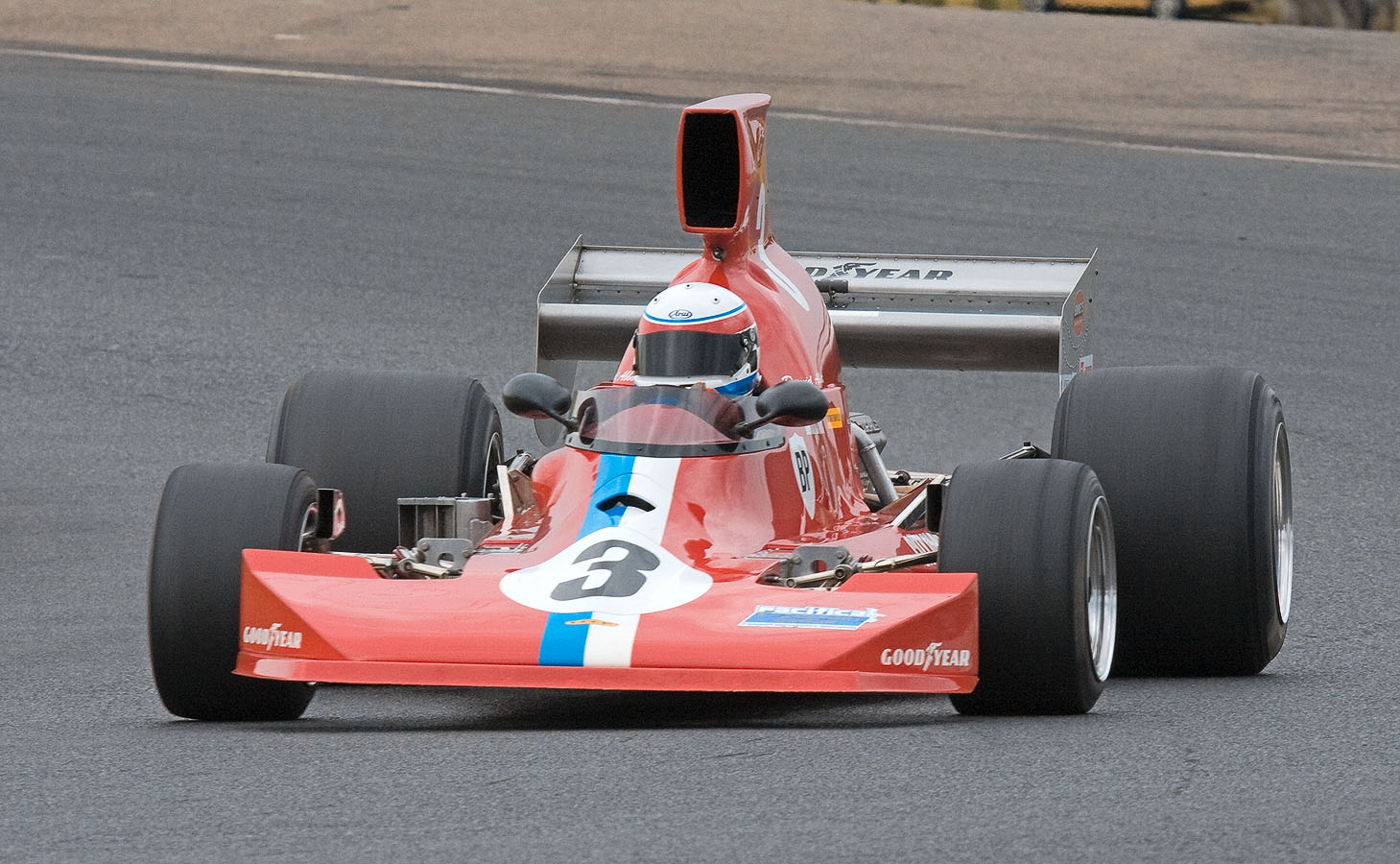
Bob Minogue contested the championship in Lola T430 HU1, a sister car to HU2, pictured above

Position	Driver	Car	Class	Entrant	San.	Ama.	Total
1	Alfredo Costanzo	McLaren M26 Chevrolet	Over 1600cc	Porsche Cars Australia	13	13	26
2	Ray Hanger	March 77B Ford BDA	Up to 1600cc	Ray Hanger	9	10	19
3	Rob Butcher	Lola T332 Chevrolet	Over 1600cc	John Blanden	6	9	15
4	John Bowe	Elfin MR9 Chevrolet	Over 1600cc	Ansett Team Elfin	9	-	9
5	Ivan Tighe	Chevron B37 Chevrolet	Over 1600cc	Ivan Tighe	-	6	6
6	Peter Edwards	Lola T332 Chevrolet	Over 1600cc	Peter Edwards	4	-	4
7	Bob Minogue	Lola T430 Chevrolet	Over 1600cc	Bob Minogue	-	3	3
8	Colin Trengrove	Lola T332 Chevrolet	Over 1600cc	Colin Trengrove	2	-	2
=	John Wright	Lola T400 Chevrolet	Over 1600cc	John Wright	-	2	2
10	Peter Middleton	Elfin MR8-C Chevrolet	Over 1600cc	Peter Middleton	1	-	1
=	Barry Singleton	Gardos BL1 Repco Holden	Over 1600cc	Barry Singleton	-	1	1

== Championship name ==
The conditions for the 1981 championship were published by CAMS under the name "Australian Formula 1 Championship". Australian Motor Racing Year 1981/82 uses both Australian Drivers Championship and Australian Formula One Championship in its review of the series. Racing Car News, January 1982 uses Australian Drivers Championship. CAMS uses Australian Drivers' Championship in its historical records and that has been followed here.
