= 1982 Australian Drivers' Championship =

Motor racing competition

Seasons
- ← 1981 1983 →

The 1982 Australian Drivers' Championship was a CAMS sanctioned Australian motor racing title open to racing cars complying with Australian Formula 1. It was the 26th Australian Drivers' Championship. The title winner, Alfredo Costanzo was awarded the 1982 CAMS "Gold Star".

== Schedule ==
The championship was contested over an eight-round series.

Round	Name	Circuit	Date	Format	Winner	Car
1		Oran Park	25 April	Two heats	John Smith	Ralt RT4 Ford
2		Adelaide International Raceway	4 July	Two heats	Andrew Miedecke	Ralt RT4/81 Ford
3		Wanneroo Park	11 July	Two heats	John Bowe	Ralt RT4/81 Ford
4		Lakeside	25 July	Two heats	Charlie O'Brien	Ralt RT4/82 Ford
5		Calder Raceway	1 August	Two heats	Alfredo Costanzo	Tiga FA81 Ford
6		Sandown Park	12 September	One race	John Bowe	Ralt RT4/81 Ford
7		Winton	24 October	Two heats	Alfredo Costanzo	Tiga FA81 Ford
8	National Panasonic Australian Grand Prix	Melbourne International Raceway	7 November	One race	Alfredo Costanzo*	Tiga FA81 Ford

- French Formula One driver Alain Prost (Ralt RT4 Ford) won the Australian Grand Prix though he was ineligible for championship points. Alfredo Costanzo was the highest place domestic competitor (5th) thus earning the maximum championship points for the round.

== Points system ==
Championship points were awarded at each round on a 9-6-4-3-2-1 basis to the first six finishers in round. Points were allotted only to Australian license holders, in their order of finishing, irrespectively of their actual position. The best seven rounds results were counted for each driver.

Where rounds were conducted over more than one heat, points were allocated on a 20-16-13-11-10-9-8-7-6-5-4-3-2-1 basis for the first 14 places in each heat and then aggregated for each driver to determine the actual round placings. Where more than one driver earned the same number of points the relevant round placing was awarded to the driver who was placed higher in the last heat.

== Championship results ==
Position	Driver	No.	Car	Entrant	Ora	Ade	Wan	Lak	Cal	San	Win	Cal	Total
1	Alfredo Costanzo	1	Tiga FA81 Ford	Porsche Cars Australia	4	3	6	2	9	-	9	9	42
2	John Bowe	4	Ralt RT4/81 Ford	Chris Leach Racing	-	6	9	-	6	9	4	4	38
3	Andrew Miedecke	2	Ralt RT4/81 Ford	A Miedecke	-	9	-	4	-	6	-	6	25
4	John Smith	71	Ralt RT4 Ford & Ralt RT1 Ford	J Smith	9	-	-	6	-	-	2	2	19
5	Charlie O'Brien	3	Ralt RT4/82 Ford	C O'Brien	-	4	4	9	-	-	-	-	17
6	Richard Davison	6	Ralt RT4/81 Ford	Clive Millis Motors Pty Ltd	6	-	-	1	2	3	-	-	12
7	Robert Handford	14	Ralt RT4/82 Ford	R Handford	-	-	-	3	1	-	-	3	7
8	Graham Watson	9	Ralt RT4 Ford	Graham Watson Motor Racing P/L	3	-	-	-	3	-	-	-	6
=	Bruce Allison	27	Ralt RT4 Ford		-	-	-	-	4	2	-	-	6
=	Alan Jones	27	Ralt RT4 Ford	Alan Jones Racing	-	-	-	-	-	-	6	-	6
11	Phillip Revell	64	Ralt RT4/81 Ford	Aub Revell	-	2	-	-	-	1	1	1	5
12	Paul Radisich	25	Ralt RT4 Ford	P Radisich	-	-	-	-	-	4	-	-	4
13	Bob Creasy	16	Ralt RT4 Ford	B Creasy	-	-	3	-	-	-	-	-	3
=	Chris Hocking	74	Cheetah Mk8 Ford	C Hocking	-	-	-	-	-	-	3	-	3
15	Doug Macarthur	12	Ralt RT4 Ford	D M Macarthur	2	-	-	-	-	-	-	-	2
=	Willie Stobard	23	Ralt RT4 Ford	W Stobard	-	-	2	-	-	-	-	-	2
17	Russell Norden		Ralt RT4/82 Ford		1	-	-	-	-	-	-	-	1
=	Peter Williamson	7	Toleman TA860 Toyota	National Panasonic (Aust.) P/L	-	1	-	-	-	-	-	-	1
=	Graham Brown	77	March 81A/82A Ford		-	-	1	-	-	-	-	-	1

Note: At the Australian Grand Prix, fifth placed Alfredo Costanzo was the highest placed driver eligible for the championship and thus was awarded the maximum championship points for the round.

== Championship name ==
The conditions for the 1982 championship were published by CAMS under the name "Australian Formula 1 Championship". Australian Motor Racing Year 1982/83 uses both "Australian Drivers Championship" and "Australian Formula One Championship" in its review of the series. CAMS uses "Australian Drivers' Championship" in its historical records and that has been followed here.
