= Dream Frequency =

English electronic music group

Dream Frequency are an English electronic music group, formed in Preston, Lancashire, England. Founded by Ian Bland in the late 1980s as one of his numerous projects, together with American singer Debbie Sharp, the duo performed initially at local events in the English rave clubs such as Shelley's.

In early 1992, the project gained their first hit single with "Feel So Real", which peaked at No. 23 on the UK Singles Chart. Shortly thereafter, "Take Me" reached No. 39 in the UK chart; the latter was released as a promo in the United States but failed to chart there. In 1994, their further efforts "Good Times" / "The Dream" (No. 67) and "You Make Me Feel Mighty Real" (No. 65) also made brief forays into the UK chart.

At the time, Ian Bland was also involved with fellow chart acts, Beat Renegades, Quake featuring Marcia Rae, and Red.

After a long pause, Dream Frequency became active again at the beginning of the new millennium, and was still represented both nationally and internationally. Bland was also one half of Dancing Divaz, and also one half of Quake and Dejure. Bland is currently producing under Hollywood Hills and runs his own label Maison Records.

== UK chart singles ==
Year	Single	Chart Peaks		Album
Year	Single	UK	AUS	Album
1990	"Live the Dream"	99	-	One Nation
1991	"Love, Peace and Harmony"	71	-	One Nation
1992	"Feel So Real"	23	113	One Nation
1992	"Take Me"	39	62	One Nation
1993	"So Sweet"	—	-	Singles only
1994	"Good Times"	67	-	Singles only
1994	"You Make Me Feel Mighty Real"	65	-	Singles only

== Other sources ==
- Larkin, Colin (1995). The Guinness Encyclopedia of Popular Music. London: Guinness Publishing. p. 1241. ISBN 978-1-56159-176-3. "Dream Frequency. On the back of popular club tunes like "Feel So Real" and "Take Me", Debbie Sharp and Ian Bland have conquered a niche market, especially in being among the few dance acts to avail themselves of the live arena. They generated several column inches when they were originally sought out by Madonna's Maverick label ..."
- "Dream Frequency at Move". Border Telegraph. 28 January 2009. Archived from the original on 8 July 2011.
- "Dream Frequency". Discogs.
