= Alfredo Costanzo =

Australian racing driver

- Nationality: Australian
- Born: 3 January 1943 (age 83) Soveria Mannelli, Calabria, Italy
- Retired: 1998

Australian GT Production Car Championship
- Years active: 1997–98
- Teams: House of Maserati
- Best finish: 8th in 1998 Australian GT Production Car Championship

Previous series
- 1967–68 1968–84 1968–71 1975 1977–79: Australian 1½ Litre Champ. Australian Drivers' Champ. Tasman Series; Australian Formula 2 Champ. Rothmans Int. Series

Championship titles
- 1980 1981 1982 1983: Australian Drivers' Champ. Australian Drivers' Champ. Australian Drivers' Champ. Australian Drivers' Champ.

Alfredo Costanzo (born 3 January 1943, in Soveria Mannelli, Calabria, Italy) is a retired Italian born Australian racing driver. From 1980 to 1983 Costanzo won four Australian Drivers' Championships in a row, equalling the record set by Bib Stillwell from 1962 to 1965.

== Career ==
=== Formula racing ===
Born in Soveria Mannelli, Calabria, Italy, Costanzo was Australia's foremost domestic open wheeler driver in the late 70s and early 80s. Under the patronage of Porsche Cars Australia distributor Alan Hamilton, Costanzo won four Australian Drivers' Championships, the CAMS Gold Star. His titles straddling the transition from F5000 to Formula Atlantic based Pacific cars.

Costanzo commenced his Formula 5000 career racing a Lola T332 which he purchased in partnership with his brother in law and team mechanic, Marino Ciuffetelli. Marino was responsible for preparing Costanzo's race car and they shared three years competing in the Rothmans series from 1977 to 1979. They were able to secure sponsorship from Stock 84 Brandy and competed in all of the scheduled races for the 1979/80 F5000 race series. In 1981 Costanzo made the switch to race under Alan Hamilton in the same Lola T430 as part of the Porsche Racing team.

The first of Costanzo's four Gold Stars was won utilising a conventional Lola T430, but the following 1981 title, the last Formula 5000 national level title ever held globally, utilised a McLaren M26, modified to incorporate ground effect by Tiga Race Cars. Costanzo won the 1982 and 1983 Australian Drivers' Championships driving a Tiga FA81 powered by a 1.6-litre, 4 cyl Ford BDA engine. Driving the FA81, Costanzo also finished second to longtime rival John Bowe in his similarly powered Ralt RT4/85 in the 1984 championship, before Alan Hamilton pulled out of open wheel racing following Costanzo's 4th place at the 1984 Australian Grand Prix leaving Costanzo without a drive and into semi-retirement.

Despite winning numerous races and championships in various classes of open wheel racing, Costanzo never achieved his goal of winning the Australian Grand Prix. He competed in 11 AGP's between 1969 and 1984, with a best finish of 4th in 1980 and again in 1984. On both occasions he was the first resident Australian driver to finish behind international Formula One drivers. Alf led from the start of the 1983 Australian Grand Prix, and built up a small lead over eventual winner Roberto Moreno of Brazil, before the diff in his Tiga FA81 failed on lap 25. Moreno later admitted that Costanzo would have been very hard to catch or pass.

Although formula cars have evolved and have generally gotten faster over time, Costanzo still holds an outright lap record for a still active Australian race circuit. His time of 50.16 seconds set in the F5000 Lola T430-Chevrolet for the 2.41 km (1.5 mi) Symmons Plains Raceway stood unchallenged from 23 March 1980 until finally beaten on 12 February 2022 by Joey Mawson who set a time of 48.5598 driving a Rogers AF01/V8 S5000.

=== Touring Cars ===
While a more than capable touring car driver, finishing fourth in the 1979 Hardie-Ferodo 1000 alongside Allan Grice he was generally overlooked for drives by the top teams and was never able to establish himself full-time in the category, and the popular Italian-Australian faded from the racing scene when he left Formula Pacific in at the end of the 1984 after finishing 4th in the Australian Grand Prix held at Melbourne's Calder Park Raceway. Costanzo was the leading local driver at the end, finishing behind winner Roberto Moreno (Brazil), 1982 World Champion Keke Rosberg (Finland), and Italian driver Andrea de Cesaris, though he did make a couple of shirt-lived comebacks.

At the insistence of his long-time open wheel rival turned touring car racer John Bowe, who to this day rates him as the best Australian driver he raced against, Costanzo was drafted into the Volvo Dealer Team in 1986 for the Castrol 500 at Sandown and the James Hardie 1000 at Bathurst. Driving a Volvo 240T, he failed to finish in both events. Again at Bowe's insistence, Alfie was the drafted into the Dick Johnson Racing Team for Sandown and Bathurst in 1988 to drive a Ford Sierra RS500. He finished sixth at the Sandown 500 with another former open wheel racer John Smith. The car he was to drive at the 1988 Tooheys 1000 at Bathurst finished second overall but unfortunately Costanzo didn't get to drive. Team leader Dick Johnson's car expired on lap 22 and Bowe's car on lap 28. Both then moved to drive the Smith/Costanzo car. Smith had driven the opening stint which left Aflie a spectator on the day.

The late 1990s saw a brief comeback as the lead driver for Marino Ciuffetelli's factory supported Maserati team of production specification Maserati Ghiblis in the Australian GT Production Car Championship. The comeback proved to be short-lived however as the cars were uncompetitive against the Porsche, Ferrari and Mazda teams. Costanzo finished 10th in the championship in 1997, and 8th in 1998.

=== Sports Cars ===
In December 1984, Costanzo accepted an offer from that year's Australian Sports Car Champion Bap Romano to co-drive the Romano WE84 Cosworth in the 1984 Sandown 1000 as part of the 1984 World Endurance Championship, the first FIA World Championship event held in Australia. Despite never having driven the car previously (a prior commitment with Porsche Cars Australia saw him miss testing the car at Calder prior to the event), Alfie showcased his skill by qualifying the 3.9L V8 powered Romano in 13th (fastest in the special AC or Australian Cars class), almost two seconds faster than car owner Romano, and only 0.4 seconds slower than the Group C2 pole winning time. After brake and gearbox troubles in the race the pair finished 109 laps, 100 laps behind the winning Porsche 956, although, despite still running at the end, the car had not completed enough laps to be classified as a finisher.

Costanzo was famously beaten by amateur driver Greg Dodd while racing Porsche coupes in Tasmania. Costanzo had three attempts at beating Dodd's lap time, but proved unsuccessful each time. Costanzo was gracious in defeat, querying Dodd on his reasons for not having been a professional driver, as his talent was “a rarity”.

Prior to Sandown, Romano wanted Costanzo as his co-driver for the race, but both Wayne Eckersley and team manager Bruce Ayers tried to persuade him to go with either the 1984 Australian Drivers' Champion John Bowe or 1983 Sports Car champion Peter Hopwood for the event, reasoning that both would be easier on the car than Costanzo who although fast, had a reputation for being hard on equipment. Unfortunately their fears were to prove correct as over the course of the race meeting Costanzo broke no less than four gearboxes, two of them in the race itself. JPS Team BMW team manager Frank Gardner told Romano after the race that while standing at the back straight entry to Sandown's new infield section, he noted that Costanzo had been changing from fifth gear straight down to second gear for the hairpin, missing fourth and third gears completely. This was causing the rear tyres to lock up, the Cosworth engine to over-rev and had seen the gearbox twice stripped of second gear. Gardner, a championship winning driver in his own right during the 1960s and 1970s including having raced a number of WEC races in Europe at tracks such as Le Mans, Spa-Francorchamps and the Nürburgring, commented that it was an endurance race and that Alfie had 'butchered' the car by not respecting the equipment.

== Career results ==
| Season | Series | Position | Car | Entrant / team |
|---|---|---|---|---|
| 1967 | Australian 1½ Litre Championship | 12th | Elfin Mono Mk2B Ford | Maranello Motors |
| 1968 | Australian Drivers' Championship | 15th | Elfin Mono Mk2B Ford | Maranello Motors |
| 1968 | Australian 1½ Litre Championship | 9th | Elfin Mono Mk2B Ford | Maranello Motors |
| 1970 | Tasman Series | 12th | McLaren M4A Cosworth | Argo Racing |
| 1975 | Australian Formula 2 Championship | 2nd | Birrana 274 Ford | Alfredo Costanzo |
| 1975 | Van Heusen Calder F2 Series | 1st | Birrana 274 | Alfredo Costanzo |
| 1976 | Australian Drivers' Championship | 5th | Lola T332 Chevrolet | Stock 84 Brandy |
| 1977 | Rothmans International Series | 6th | Lola T332 Chevrolet | Auto Sprint Motors |
| 1977 | Australian Drivers' Championship | 4th | Lola T332 Chevrolet | |
| 1979 | Rothmans International Series | 2nd | Lola T430 Chevrolet | Porsche Cars Australia |
| 1979 | Australian Drivers' Championship | 3rd | Lola T430 Chevrolet | Porsche Cars Australia |
| 1980 | Australian Drivers' Championship | 1st | Lola T430 Chevrolet | Porsche Distributors |
| 1981 | Australian Drivers' Championship | 1st | McLaren M26 Chevrolet | Porsche Cars Australia |
| 1982 | Australian Drivers' Championship | 1st | Tiga FA81 Ford | Porsche Cars Australia |
| 1982 | National Panasonic Series | = 2nd | Tiga FA82 Ford; Tiga FA82 Ford | Porsche Cars Australia |
| 1983 | Australian Drivers' Championship | 1st | Tiga FA81 Ford | Porsche Cars Australia |
| 1984 | Australian Drivers' Championship | 2nd | Tiga FA81 Ford | Porsche Cars Australia |
| 1984 | World Endurance Championship | NC | Romano WE84 Cosworth | Bap Romano Racing |
| 1997 | Australian GT Production Car Championship | 10th | Maserati Ghibli Cup | Cisco System Maserati |
| 1998 | Australian GT Production Car Championship | 8th | Maserati Ghibli Cup | House of Maserati |

=== Complete World Sportscar Championship results ===
(key) (Races in bold indicate pole position) (Races in italics indicate fastest lap)

| Year | Team | Car | 1 | 2 | 3 | 4 | 5 | 6 | 7 | 8 | 9 | 10 | 11 | DC | Points |
|---|---|---|---|---|---|---|---|---|---|---|---|---|---|---|---|
| 1984 | (Australia) Bap Romano Racing | Romano WE84 Cosworth | MNZ | SIL | LMS | NUR | BRA | MOS | SPA | IMO | FJI | KYL | SAN; NC | NC | 0 |

=== Complete Bathurst 1000 results ===
| Year | Team | Co-drivers | Car | Class | Laps | Pos. | Class pos. |
|---|---|---|---|---|---|---|---|
| 1979 | (Australia) Craven Mild Racing | (Australia) Allan Grice | Holden LX Torana SS A9X Hatchback | A | 154 | 4th | 4th |
| 1984 | (Australia) Network Alfa | (Australia) Colin Bond | Alfa Romeo GTV6 | Group A | 111 | DNF | DNF |
| 1986 | (Australia) Volvo Dealer Team | (Australia) John Bowe | Volvo 240T | B | 113 | DNF | DNF |
| 1988* | (Australia) Shell Ultra Hi Racing | (Australia) John Smith (Australia) Dick Johnson (Australia) John Bowe | Ford Sierra RS500 | A | 160 | 2nd (DND) | 2nd (DND) |
| 1989 | (Australia) Lusty Engineering | (Australia) Graham Lusty | Holden VL Commodore SS Group A SV | A | 146 | 14th | 14th |

* 1988 - Car #18 finished 2nd but Costanzo never got to drive.

Sporting positions
| Preceded by Johnnie Walker | Winner of the Australian Drivers' Championship; 1980, 1981, 1982 and 1983 | Succeeded by John Bowe |
