= Formula Pacific =

Motor racing category

Formula Pacific was a motor racing category which was used in the Pacific Basin area from 1977 to 1982. It specified a single-seat, open-wheeler chassis powered by a production-based four-cylinder engine of under 1600cc capacity. The formula was based on Formula Atlantic, with provision made for the use of Japanese engines. The category was superseded in 1983 by Formula Mondial, which was devised by the FIA to replace both Formula Atlantic and Formula Pacific.

== Introduction ==
The Formula Pacific category was created at a meeting of representatives from Pacific Basin countries (Australia, New Zealand, Canada and Japan) in 1976. The formula was based on Formula Atlantic, with provision made for the use of Japanese engines. The first races to be held under the new formula were staged in New Zealand in January 1977.

== New Zealand ==
New Zealand staged its first Formula Pacific races in January 1977 having abandoned Formula 5000 and moved to the new formula in that year. The category continued there until Formula Mondial was introduced in 1983.

== Australia ==
Formula Pacific was adopted as part of Australian Formula 1 alongside the 5-litre Formula 5000 class in 1979 and it became the sole component of Australian Formula 1 in 1982. Formula Mondial was adopted as the new Australian Formula 1 in 1983 however cars complying with Formula Pacific would continue to compete alongside the new cars until the end of that year.

== Japan ==
The Japan Automobile Federation (JAF) ran a Formula Pacific championship from 1978 to 1982. JAF had instituted a Formula Pacific class in 1977, the cars racing alongside Formula 2000 cars, but with only a single entrant the class was cancelled that year.

== Macau ==
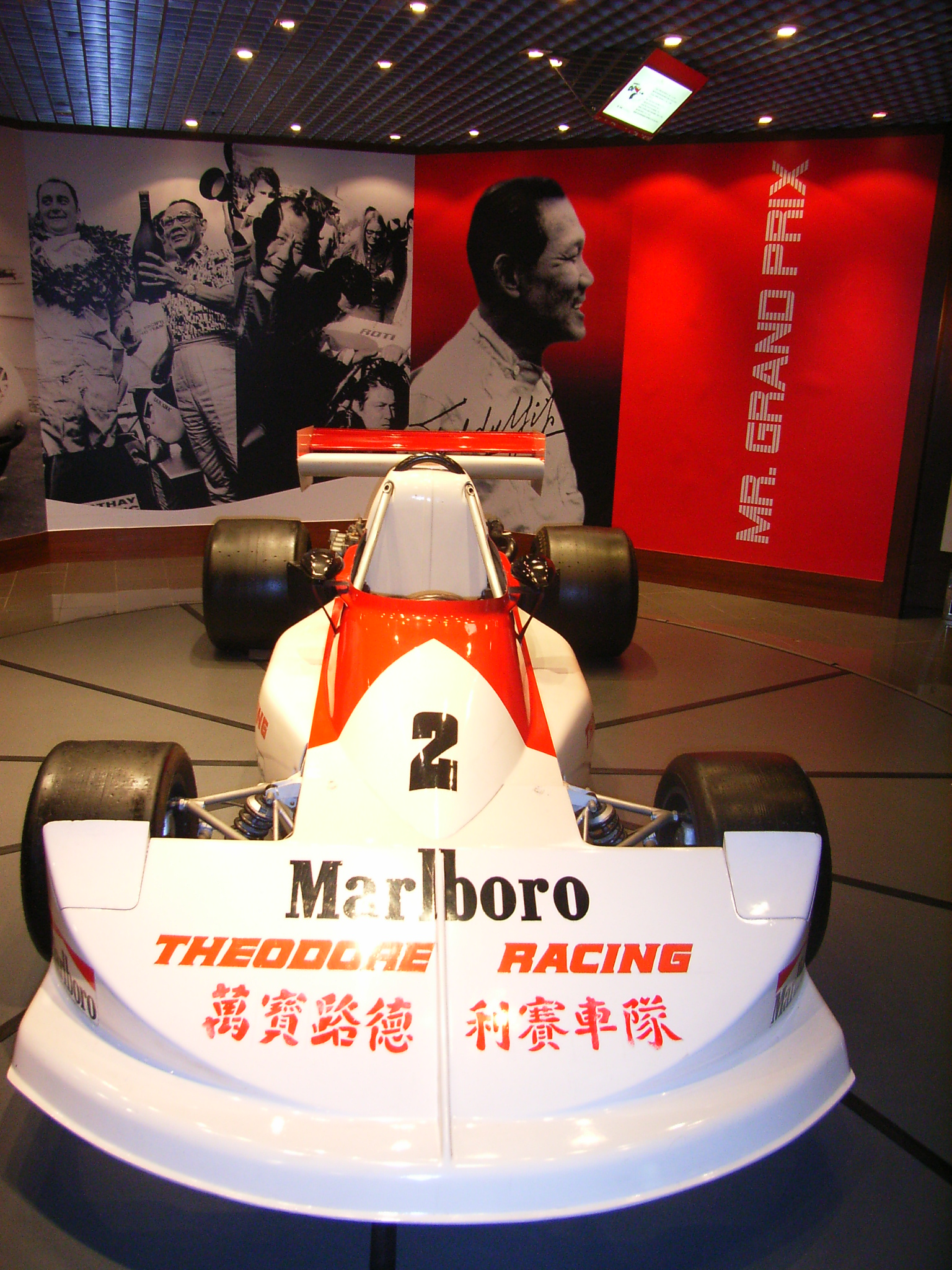
Theodore Racing's Formula Pacific race car at the Macau Grand Prix Museum.

The Macau Grand Prix used Formula Pacific regulations from 1977 until Formula 3 rules were adopted for the 1983 event. Winners of the race include eventual F1 drivers Riccardo Patrese and Roberto Moreno.

== List of Formula Pacific series winners ==
Southeast Asian Series
Year	Driver	Car
1976	(New Zealand) Graeme Lawrence	March-Ford
1977	(New Zealand) Steve Millen	Chevron-Ford
New Zealand International Series
1977	(Finland) Keke Rosberg	Chevron-Ford
1978	(Finland) Keke Rosberg	Chevron-Ford
1979	(Italy) Teo Fabi	March-Ford
1980	(New Zealand) Dave McMillan	Ralt-Ford
1981	(New Zealand) David Oxton	Ralt-Ford
1982	(Brazil) Roberto Moreno	Ralt-Ford
1983	(Canada) Allen Berg	Ralt-Ford
1984	(New Zealand) Ken Smith	Ralt-Ford
1985	(United States) Ross Cheever	Ralt-Ford
1986	(United States) Jeff MacPherson	Ralt-Ford
1987	(New Zealand) Mike Thackwell	Ralt-Ford
1988	(New Zealand) Paul Radisich	Ralt-Ford
1989	(United States) Dean Hall	Ralt-Ford
1990	(New Zealand) Ken Smith	Swift-Ford
1991	(New Zealand) Craig Baird	Swift-Toyota
1992	(New Zealand) Craig Baird	Reynard-Toyota
1993	(New Zealand) Craig Baird	Reynard-Toyota
New Zealand Gold Star
1977	(New Zealand) Dave McMillan	Ralt-Ford
1978	(New Zealand) Ross Stone	Cuda-Ford
1979	(New Zealand) Dave McMillan	Ralt-Ford
1980	(New Zealand) Dave McMillan	Ralt-Ford
1981	(New Zealand) David Oxton	Ralt-Ford
1982	(New Zealand) David Oxton	Ralt-Ford
1983	not held	
1984	(New Zealand) Ken Smith	Ralt-Ford
1985	(New Zealand) Ken Smith	Ralt-Ford
1986	not held	
1987	(New Zealand) Ken Smith	Ralt-Ford
1988	(New Zealand) Paul Radisich	Ralt-Ford
1989	(United States) Dean Hall	Ralt-Ford
1990	(New Zealand) Ken Smith	Swift-Ford
1991	(New Zealand) Craig Baird	Swift-Toyota
1992	(New Zealand) Craig Baird	Reynard-Toyota
1993	(New Zealand) Craig Baird	Reynard-Toyota
All-Japan Championship
1978	(Japan) Masahiro Hasemi	Chevron B40-Nissan
1979	(Japan) Takao Wada	March 79B-Nissan
1980	(Japan) Masahiro Hasemi	Chevron 792/802/79B-Nissan
1981	(Japan) Kazuyoshi Hoshino	March 79B-Nissan
1982	(Japan) Kazuyoshi Hoshino	Ralt RT4-Nissan
South Pacific Championship
1981	(New Zealand) David Oxton	Ralt-Ford
1982	(Brazil) Roberto Moreno	Ralt-Ford
National Panasonic Series
1981	(Australia) Bruce Allison	Ralt-Ford
1982	(Australia) Charlie O'Brien	Ralt RT4
Australian Drivers' Championship (Gold Star)
1982	(Australia) Alfredo Costanzo	Tiga-Ford
1983 +	(Australia) Alfredo Costanzo	Tiga-Ford
1984 +	(Australia) John Bowe	Ralt-Ford
1985 +	(Australia) John Bowe	Ralt-Ford
1986 +	(Australia) Graham Watson	Ralt-Ford
FISA Formula Mondial World Cup
1983	(Australia) Charlie O'Brien	Ralt-Ford
Indian Formula Pacific Series
1984	(United Kingdom) Jim Crawford	Chevron-Ford
1985	(United Kingdom) Jim Crawford	Chevron-Ford
1986	(India) Vicky Chandhok	Chevron-Ford

% : The 1976 series was open to Formula Atlantic cars.

+ : From 1983 to 1986 the Australian Drivers' Championship was contested by cars complying with Formula Mondial regulations.
