= Formula Mondial =

International motor racing category

Formula Mondial was an international motor racing category which was introduced to replace both Formula Atlantic and the similar Formula Pacific in 1983.

The regulations specified a single-seat, open-wheeled chassis with a flat bottom, thus excluding any ground effects designs. Engines had to be 1.6-litre four-cylinder units sourced from a production touring car although only the Ford Cosworth BDA engine was actually homologated for the category.

The FIA World Cup Commission issued regulations for the staging of various zone competitions throughout the world with competitors intended to come together for a World Cup final. The Southern Pacific Zone series was staged in New Zealand and Australia in early 1983 and was won by Australian Charlie O’Brien and the Formula Mondial North American Cup series was won by American Michael Andretti. However the World Cup finals series, which was to have been contested over four races in Quebec, Canada in September 1983 was cancelled the month before it was due to be run.

Although embraced at a national level by Australia and New Zealand, Formula Mondial was not taken up as expected in the South East Asia region—where Formula Two was adopted—or by the United Kingdom, which favoured Formula Three. It was abandoned in the United States and Canada. and ceased to be an International Formula from the end of 1984. The category largely died out in Australia after 1986, with Australian Formula 2 taking over as the top open wheel series for two years until the advent of Formula Holden in 1989.
