= Ralt RT4 =

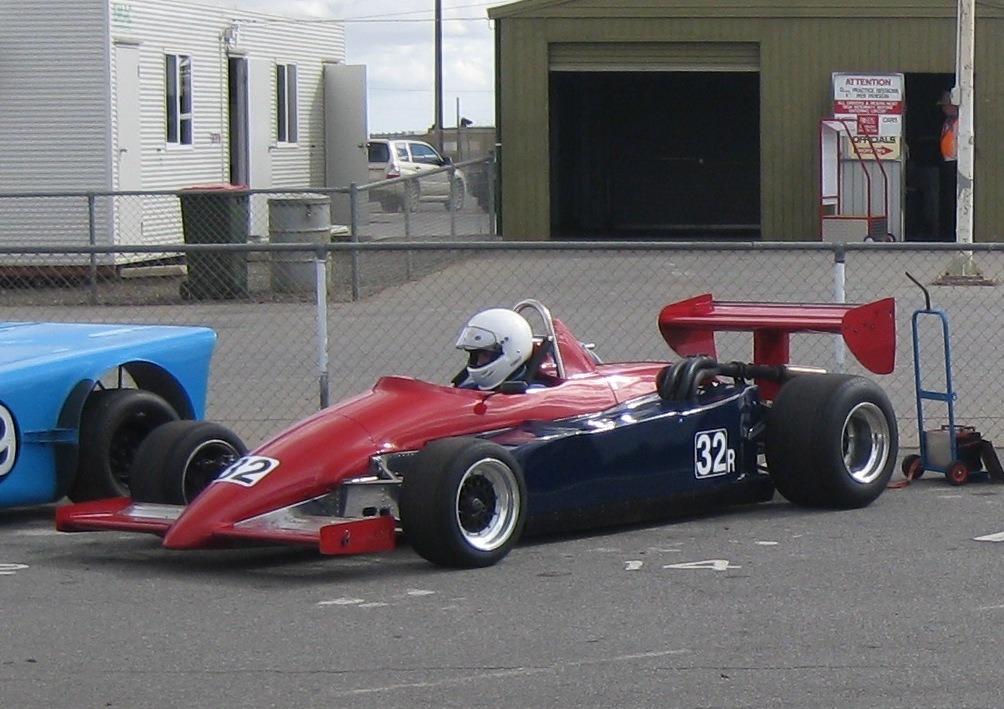
Ralt RT4

The Ralt RT4 is an open-wheel formula racing car, designed, developed, and built by Ralt for Formula Atlantic (and was also occasionally raced in Formula Two categories) in 1980. It was later converted into a closed-wheel prototype and used in the revived Can-Am series between 1982 and 1985, where it achieved only modest success. In Can-Am competition, the car achieved 1 podium finish, 1 class victory, and a best result of a 2nd-place finish.

== Background ==
The RT4 was the car of choice in Australian Formula 1 and Formula Mondial during the early to mid-1980s. Roberto Moreno drove an RT4 to win the Australian Grand Prix in 1981, 1983, and the final AGP in 1984 before it became a round of the Formula One World Championship in 1985, while Alain Prost also drove one to victory in the 1982 Australian Grand Prix. Other F1 drivers to drive a Ralt RT4 in Australia during this period included Jacques Laffite and Andrea de Cesaris, as well as World Champions Alan Jones, Nelson Piquet, Keke Rosberg, and Niki Lauda. The RT4, generally powered by a naturally aspirated 1.6 L (98 cu in), four-cylinder Ford BDA engine which produced around 220 bhp (164 kW; 223 PS), also saw John Bowe win the Australian Drivers' Championship in 1984 and 1985, while Australian Ralt importer Graham Watson used one to win the 1986 championship. The chassis was constructed from an aluminum monocoque, covered with a fiberglass body. It was also very light, weighing only 1,045 lb (474 kg).
