= Ralt =

Manufacturer of single-seater racing cars

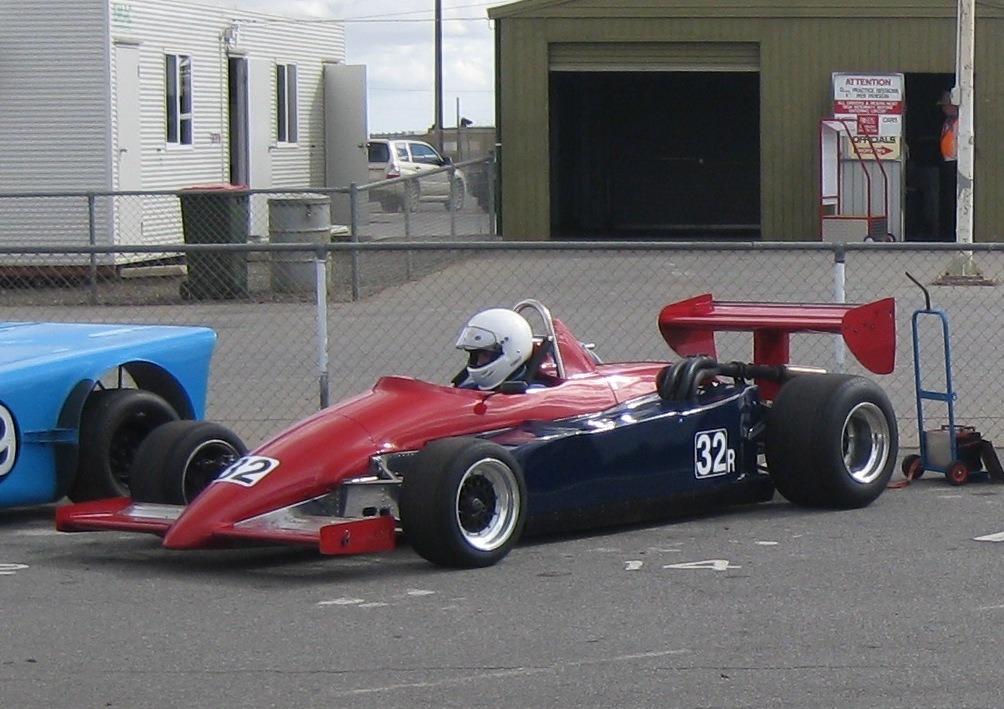
Ralt RT4

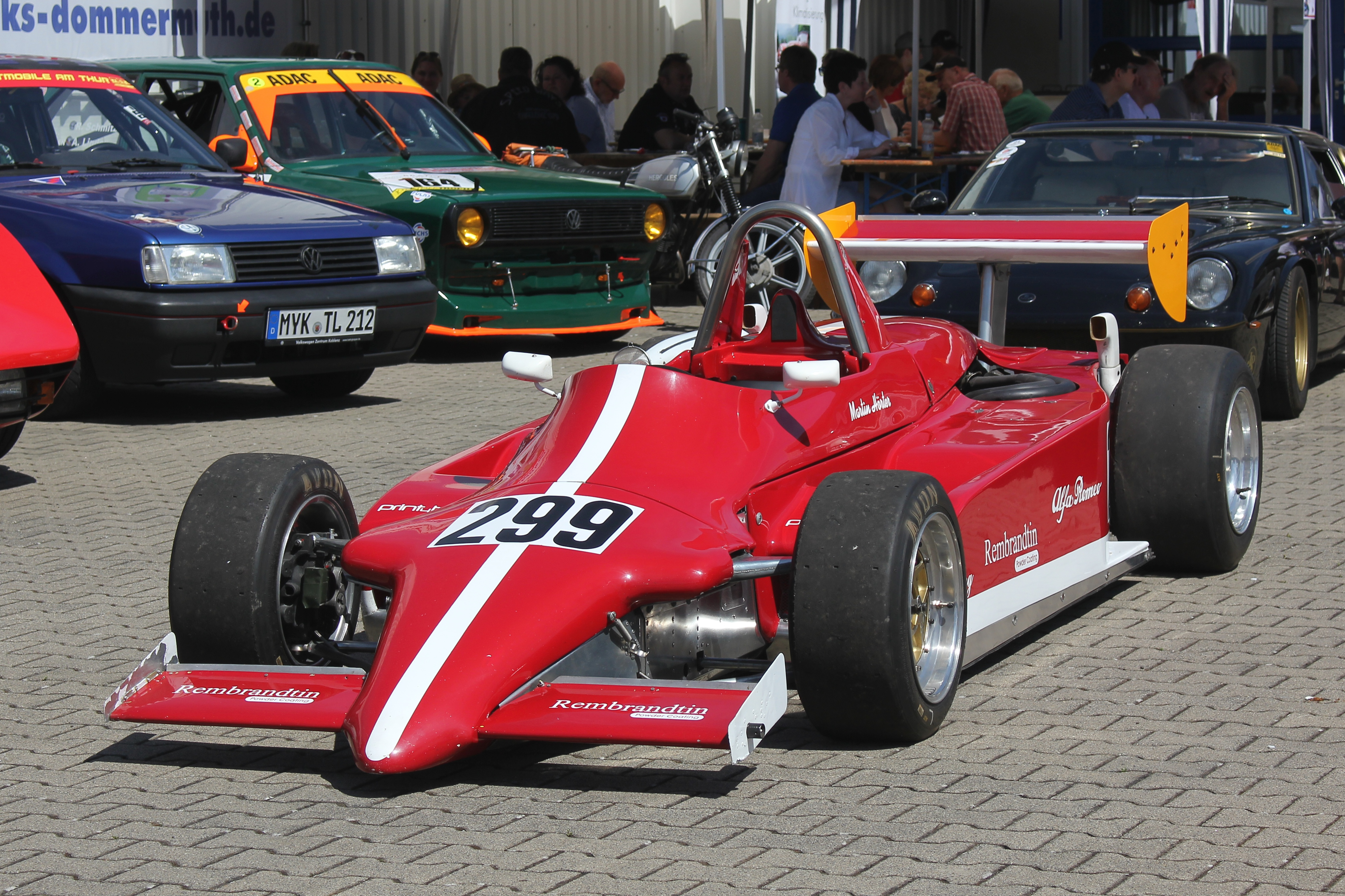
Ralt RT3/82-Alfa Romeo Formula 3 car

Ralt was a manufacturer of single-seater racing cars, founded by ex-Jack Brabham associate Ron Tauranac after he sold out his interest in Brabham to Bernie Ecclestone. Ron and his brother had built some specials in Australia in the 1950s under the Ralt name (standing for Ron and Austin Lewis Tauranac). Tauranac won the 1954 NSW Hillclimb Championship in the Ralt 500.

== Cars ==
=== Early Ralts ===
Built with the assistance of Tauranac's younger brother, Austin, in Australia. The Mk was powered by a 1,932cc pushrod Norton ES2. Tauranac made his own flywheel, connecting rods, and cylinders. The Mk2 was a sports car built by and for Austin, with a Ford 10 engine, Standard 10 gearbox, and Morris 8 rear axle. The Mk3 was purchased from the Hooper brothers when they retired. Tauranac designed a new chassis for it, and the car was primarily driven by Austin. The Mk4 began as a special, using a Vincent-HRD 1,000 cc (61 cu in) V-twin and a de Dion rear suspension. The car took two years to develop in Tauranac's spare time. After just two events, somebody insisted on buying it, so plans were made for a production run of five. The Mk5 was planned by Austin as a Peugeot-engined car, but abandoned so he could assist Tauranac with the production Mk 4s.

=== Modern Ralts ===
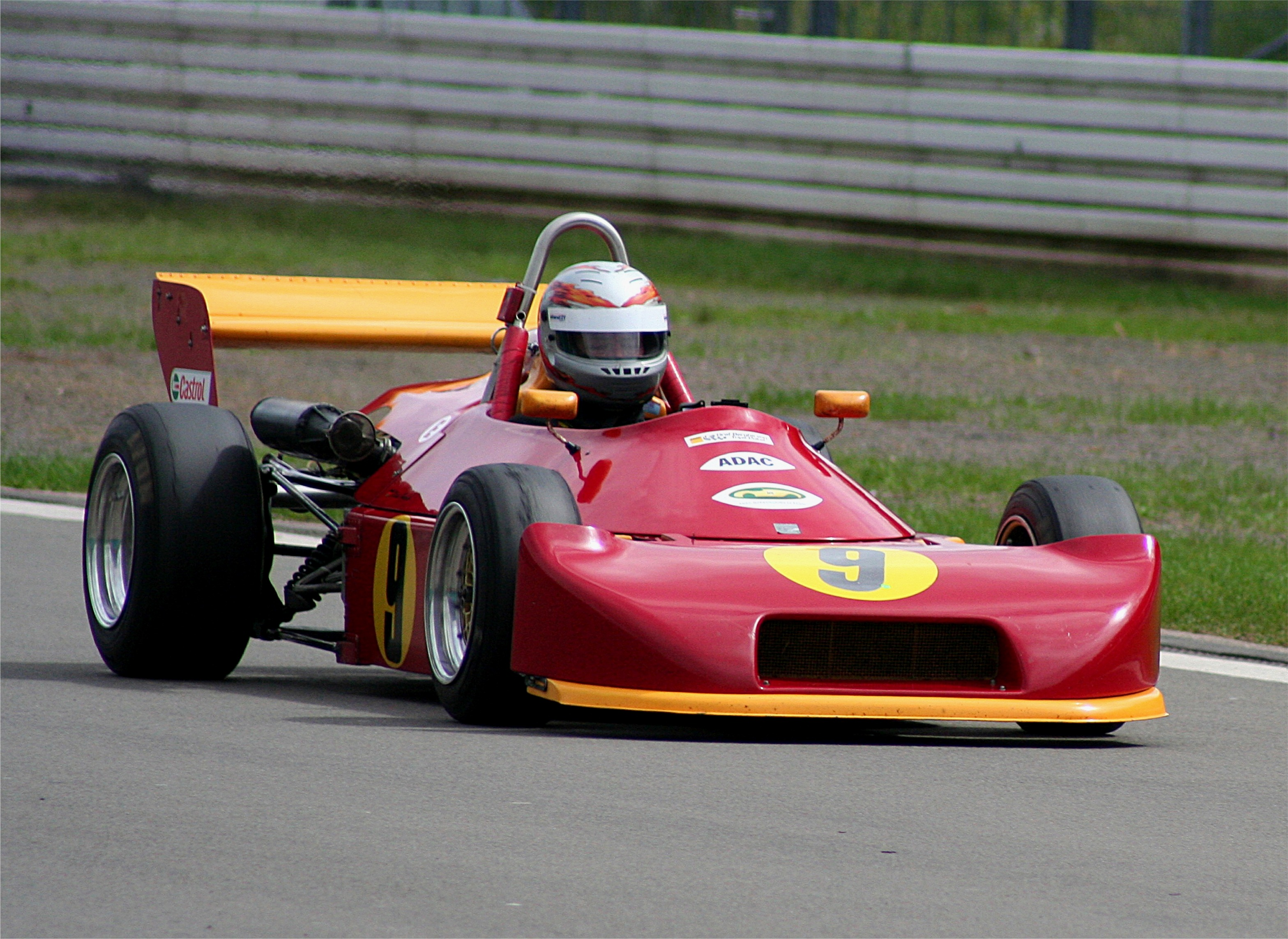
Ralt RT1 at the DAMC 05 Oldtimer Festival Nürburgring

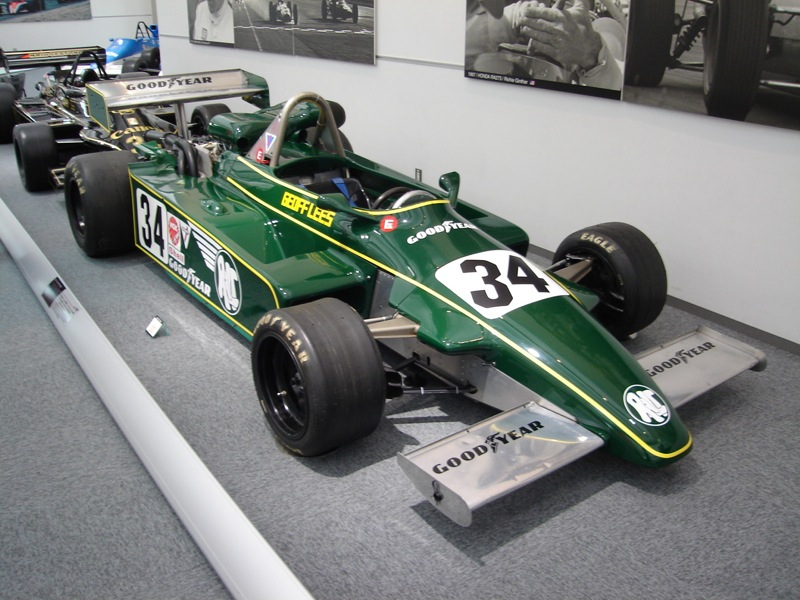
1980 Ralt RH6 Formula 2 chassis of Geoff Lees, powered by a Honda V6 engine

Tauranac founded Ralt in 1974 and the first product was the RT1, a simple and versatile car used in Formula Two, Formula Three and Formula Atlantic racing between 1975 and 1978.

In 1979, the RT2 was developed for Formula Two, with three cars being built for the Toleman team. Later, three more cars were built for private owners, including one exclusively for the revival of the Can-Am series. For 1980 Toleman built its own car, the TG280, which was based somewhat on the RT2 design; this was later built under licence by Lola as the T850 and further modified by Docking-Spitzley as the DS1. Two of the original Toleman RT2s were later raced in Can-Am, while the third ended up in South Africa, where copies called Lants were made. Related cars have appeared in hillclimb and sprint events in the UK as Romans and SPAs.

The RT2 also provided the basis for three cars in other categories: the RT3 in Formula Three, the RT4 in Formula Atlantic (which was also occasionally raced in Formula Two), and the RT5 in Formula Super Vee.

The RT4 was the car of choice in Australian Formula 1 and Formula Mondial during the early to mid-1980s. Roberto Moreno drove an RT4 to win the Australian Grand Prix in 1981, 1983, and the final AGP in 1984 before it became a round of the Formula One World Championship in 1985, while Alain Prost also drove one to victory in the 1982 Australian Grand Prix. Other F1 drivers to drive a Ralt RT4 in Australia during this period included Jacques Laffite and Andrea de Cesaris, as well as World Champions Alan Jones, Nelson Piquet, Keke Rosberg and Niki Lauda. The RT4, generally powered by a 1.6 litre, 4 cyl Ford BDA engine which produced around 220 bhp (164 kW; 223 PS), also saw John Bowe win the Australian Drivers' Championship in 1984 and 1985, while Australian Ralt importer Graham Watson used one to win the 1986 championship.

=== Works F2 cars ===
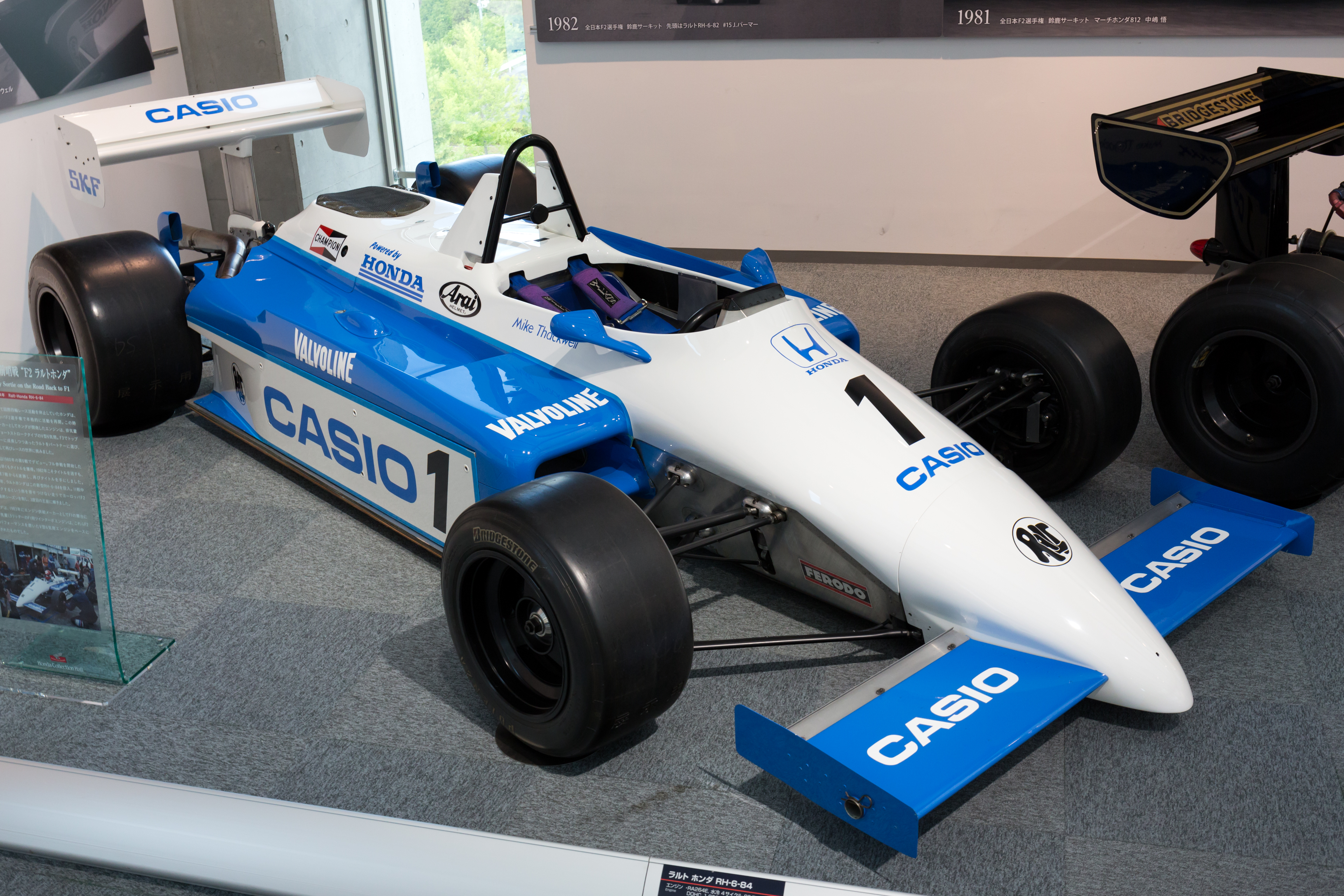
1984 Ralt RH6/84 Formula 2 car

In 1980, Honda asked John Judd's Engine Developments to develop an engine for Formula Two, which would be used by the works Ralt team. Tauranac had previously been associated with Honda through Brabham's introduction of the Japanese marque to F2 in the 1960s, while Jack Brabham had co-founded Engine Developments with Judd. Between 1980 and 1984, Ralt's works F2 cars carried the RH6 designation: the RH6/80 and RH6/81 were developments of the RT2 theme, while the RH6/82, RH6/83 and RH6/84 were further developed around a new honeycomb tub. The cars proved very successful, winning 20 championship races and the 1981, 1983 and 1984 championships with Geoff Lees, Jonathan Palmer and Mike Thackwell respectively.

=== Formula 3000 cars ===
In 1985, Formula Two was replaced by the new Formula 3000 category. Ralt's first F3000 car was the RB20, essentially a further development of the RH6/84 but fitted with a Cosworth DFV engine. (The 'B' in the designation stood for Bridgestone, Ralt's tyre supplier and major sponsor at the time.) The car won four races of the inaugural International F3000 Championship with Thackwell and John Nielsen.

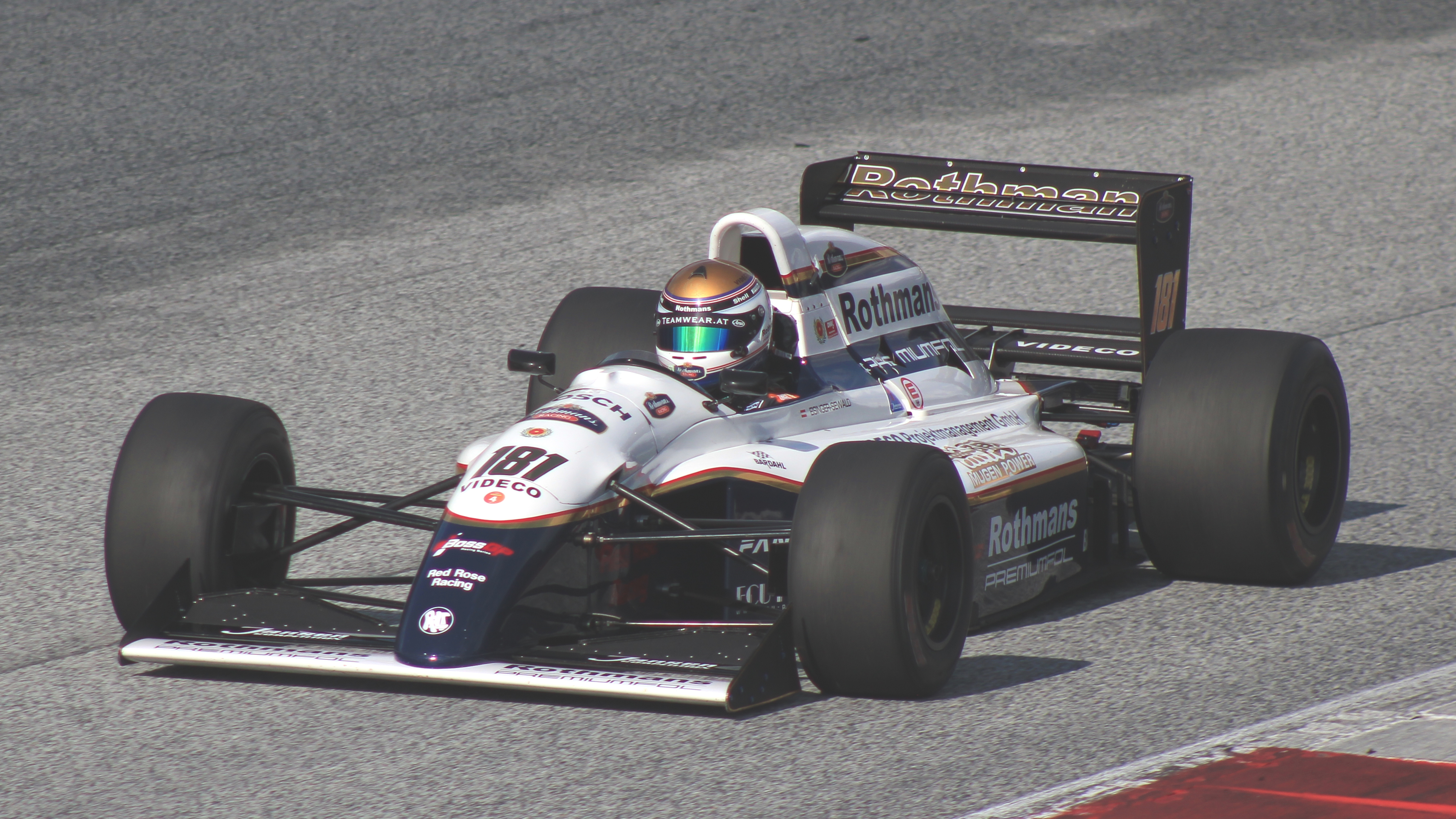
RT23

For 1986, the RT20 was developed - a cheaper, more economical car with a traditional aluminium tub that was easier to maintain. Honda returned as the engine supplier for the works team, while customers used Cosworths. The works team won one race with Thackwell, while Pierluigi Martini and Luis Pérez-Sala won four races between them in customer cars entered by the Italian Pavesi Racing team. The RT21 was a further development for 1987, again incorporating honeycomb elements in the monocoque; Honda continued to supply the works team, with Roberto Moreno and Maurício Gugelmin winning one race each.

1988 was to be Ralt's last year as an independent chassis supplier and team in F3000. The RT22 was its first carbon-fibre F3000 car, but with Lola and newcomers Reynard beginning to dominate the category, it achieved little success. In the autumn of 1988, Tauranac sold Ralt to the March Group.

The Ralt name reappeared in F3000 in 1991, when the RT23 was manufactured under the March Group's auspices. Jean-Marc Gounon won at Pau in an RT23 entered by Mike Earle's 3001 International team, but otherwise the car was unsuccessful. An updated version, the RT24, was built by Nick Wirth's Simtek company for 1992, but soon after, Ralt withdrew from F3000 for good.

Second-hand Ralt F3000 cars were used extensively in Australia's Formula Holden category from its introduction in 1989, fitted with the formula's 3.8-litre Holden V6 engine. Rohan Onslow won the 1989 Australian Drivers' Championship in an RT20, while Simon Kane won the 1990 championship in an RT21.

=== Formula Three cars ===
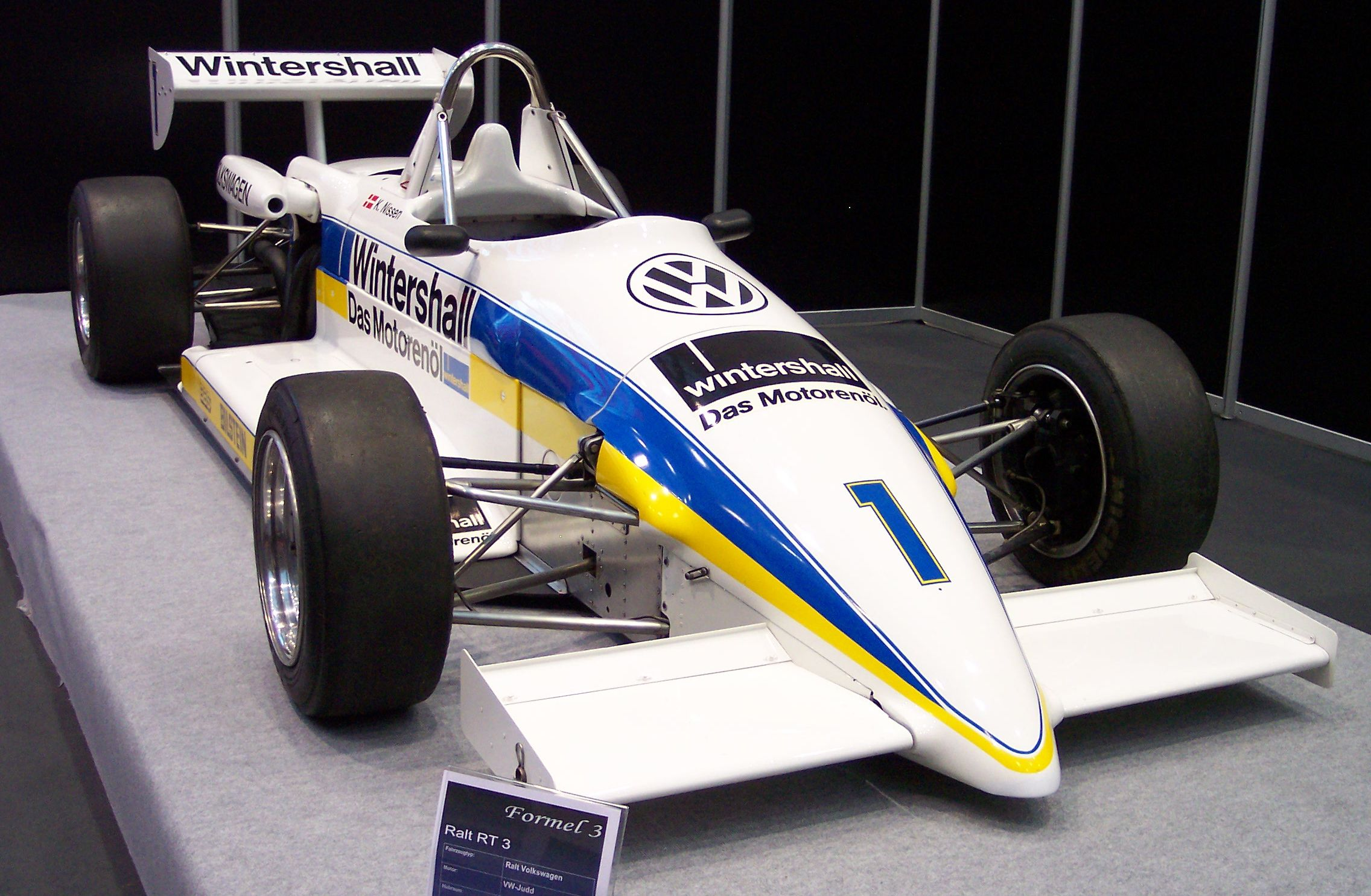
Ralt RT3

RT3 has a long history - a 1979 ground effect Formula Three car which was enhanced every year until 1984, becoming the dominant car in the formula. Ayrton Senna won the 1983 British Formula Three Championship driving an RT3. RT30 was introduced for the flat-bottom rules coming into effect in 1985. This was notable mainly for being very asymmetric - it had only one sidepod containing a radiator, and a deformable structure panel on the other side. The RT30 was, like many Ralts, developed over several seasons, evolving by the 1985–6 seasons into a highly competitive car, although some teams converted their old RT30s into flat-bottom cars and enjoyed a measure of success with these.

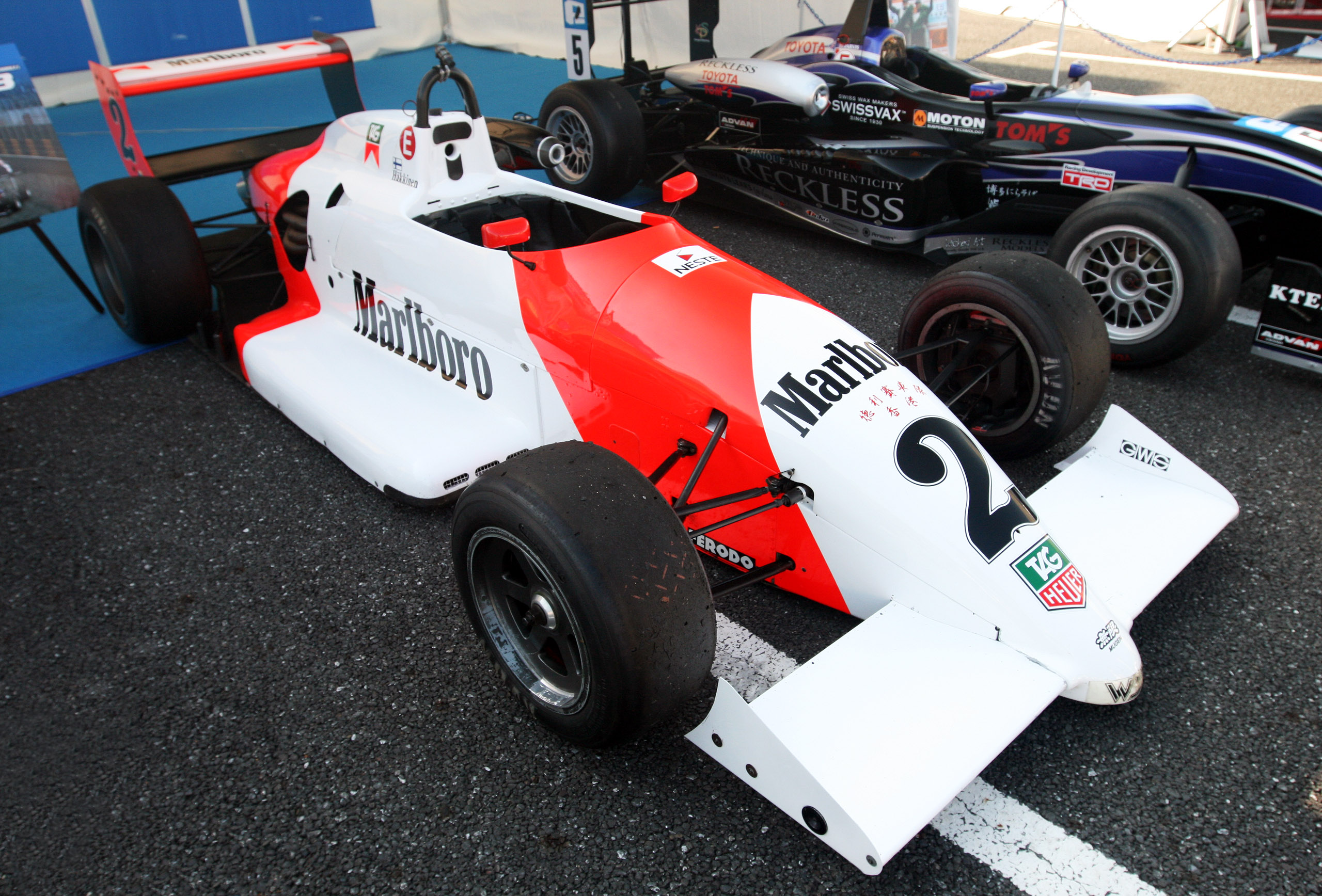
RT34

RT31, the 1987 car, applied some of the honeycomb ideas from the RT21 F3000 car; it was fairly competitive but Bruce Cary's experiments with lowering the engine showed the way ahead. RT32: for the 1988 season, Cary's modifications were incorporated and a honeycomb/carbon tub was adopted. The RT32 theme saw Ralt through to the end of Tauranac's time with them, subsequent RT33 (1989)- RT35 (1991) cars essentially being developments of this basic model. The 1992 RT36 was designed by Andy Thorby and lightly revised by Tauranac for 1993 as the RT37. These cars were not particularly successful in Formula Three (in part because many teams switched to Dallara chassis and therefore did not develop them) but the basic monocoque continues to be extremely successful as a hillclimb car nearly fifteen years later. The Ralt 94C was designed by Chris Radage and was not a success.

=== Later Formula Atlantic variants ===
The RT40 and RT41 were Formula Atlantic derivatives of the later Formula Three cars; the RT40 was the last Ralt with which Tauranac was involved. Many Champcar World Series and Indy Racing League drivers past and present, honed their skills in these cars, including Jacques Villeneuve, the 1995 Indy 500 winner and 1997 F1 World Champion. After being phased out of the Pro Atlantic series in 1998 in favor of the Swift 008a, the Ralt RT40s and 41s are still being raced competitively (2007) in the Sports Car Club of America, some 13–14 years after the RT40's debut, with Rennie Clayton winning the SCCA Championship in a Ralt RT-41 as recently as 2003.

Originally equipped for Pro Atlantic racing with a highly tuned variant of the Toyota 4A-GE twin cam engine displacing 1.6 litres and developing approximately 250 bhp; several of these chassis have been converted both with bodywork to compete in SCCA C Sports Racer (CSR) and now Prototype 1 (P1) with other engine packages such as the twin rotor 13b Mazda, Honda and Cosworth 1600.

== Ralt in other hands ==
Ralt's 1988 Formula 3000 car was proving a challenge to develop; the works drivers' backers (for the first time, Tauranac was running paying drivers rather than paying his own) encouraged them to leave the team and not pay up; the company was also suffering from loss of its American markets for RT4s (Swift were upping the stakes dramatically) and RT5s (SuperVee was on its last legs in the US as a major category). Reynard's aggressive marketing was cutting into the F3000 and F3 markets. Tauranac was looking to sell the company and ultimately ended up selling out to March for just over a million pounds; they had concentrated on high-value bespoke racing cars and allowed their customer cars to atrophy so the merger appeared to be a good move.

The subsequent history of Ralt as part of March is complex, but can be summarised as - operated as March's customer car division for a couple of years, was part of a management buyout when the March Group board decided to divest itself of all its motor racing interests; bought by enthusiasts Andrew Fitton and Steve Ward in 1993. Tauranac left from the firm soon after. Fitton and Ward wound March up, but Ward continued operating Ralt independently - the Ralt name continues, and Ralt F3 cars have occasionally appeared.

== Tauranac post-Ralt ==
Tauranac remained involved with various aspects of the sport after departing from Ralt, including racing-school cars for Honda, a Formula Renault car, consulting work for the Arrows Formula One team, and continued his relationship with Honda that went back to their early Formula Two days as engine supplier to Brabham in the 1960s. Ralt Australia was run by New Zealander Graham Watson until his death in 2009.
