= Romano Racing =

- Manufacturer: Holden
- Team Principal: Bap Romano
- Race Drivers: Paul Romano (1995, 1997–2003); Troy Dunstan (1995); Allan Grice (1997); Steve Ellery (1998); Tomas Mezera (1999); Darren Hossack (1999); James Brock (2000); David Parsons (2000); Owen Kelly (2001)
- Chassis: VP Commodore; VS Commodore; VT Commodore
- Debut: 1995

Romano Racing was an Australian motor racing team that competed in Australian V8 Supercar racing between 1995 and 2003.

== History ==
=== Sports Cars ===
Romano Racing had its roots in the 1980s when team principal Bap Romano raced in the Australian Sports Car Championship (ASCC). In 1981, Romano commissioned former McLaren Formula One mechanic and the owner of Kaditcha cars in Queensland Barry Lock to build him a Le Mans type Group A Sports Car to run in the ASCC. The car, known as the Kaditcha K583 was the first closed top Sports Car seen in Australia and incorporated full ground effects aerodynamics. Powered by a Cosworth DFV V8 engine, Romano finished in 6th place in the 1983 ASCC before going on to dominate the 1984 Championship. In 1984, Romano had the car re-engineered into a race winner by former Williams F1 mechanic Wayne Eckersley and it was renamed the Romano WE84. Romano and four time CAMS Gold Star winner Alfredo Costanzo drove the car in the final round of the 1984 World Endurance Championship at the Sandown Raceway in Melbourne.

Reliability became an issue in 1985 which saw Romano fail to defend his Sports Car Championship. The sports car program came to an abrupt end in 1986 when Romano heavily crashed the car at Amaroo Park in Sydney where the front end was wrecked and Romano suffered two broken legs.

=== Open Wheelers ===
In 1986, Bap Romano decided to also race in the Australian Drivers' Championship and although he missed most of the year recovering from his injuries, he still finished in third place in the 1986 Australian Drivers' Championship driving a Ralt RT4, winning his final open wheel race of the season in Round 3 of the championship at Wanneroo Park Raceway in Perth.

Bap Romano also drove in some rounds of the 1989 Australian Drivers' Championship in a Spa FB001 Formula Holden.

=== V8 Supercars ===
After Bap Romano disappeared from the racing scene in the late 1980s to concentrate on his business interests in Brisbane, Romano Racing was founded on the Gold Coast in 1995 when Bap Romano purchased a Holden VP Commodore from Logamo for his son Paul to race. The team competed in all races of the 1995 season. The team was disbanded at the end of the year with Romano racing a Ford EF Falcon for Alan Jones Racing in 1996. After this arrangement came to an end, Romano Racing was reformed for 1997 with the Commodore upgraded to VS specifications.

Romano continued to race the VS until it made its last appearance at the 2001 Australian Grand Prix support race. To allow Tom Walkinshaw Racing (TWR) to enter four cars in the 2001 series, and circumnavigate a restriction that allowed only with only three cars able to be entered under each Level 1 franchise, the Romano Racing franchise were leased to TWR. The Romano franchise was used by TWR to enter the K-Mart Racing cars, while the Romano car was entered under the Holden Young Lions banner as part of the Holden Racing Team franchise. A Rod Nash Racing VX Commodore was leased for the first few rounds, until a TWR VX became available and was purchased.

At the end of 2002 the Level 1 franchise was sold to Team Dynamik and a Level 2 franchise purchased from McDougall Motorsport. Romano raced at the Adelaide 500 in 2003, with the franchise then leased out on occasions to other teams in 2004 including Paul Morris Motorsport and Walden Motorsport. In 2005 it was leased to Perkins Engineering. In 2009, the franchise was sold to Walkinshaw Racing. The team today runs in relevance as Blanchard Racing Team running the No.3 Ford Mustang for Tim Slade
