= 1984 Sandown 1000 =

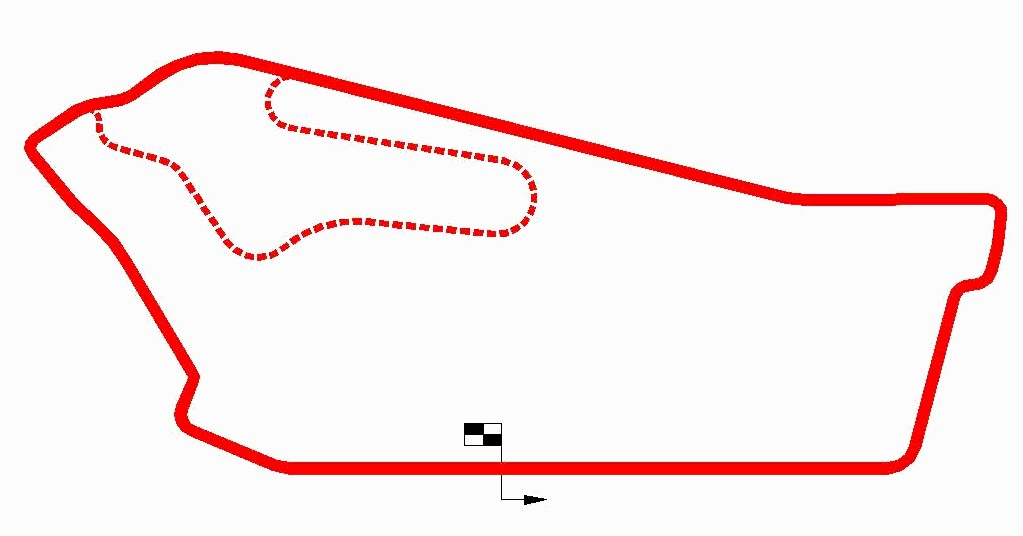
Layout of the Sandown Raceway international circuit (1984-1998)

The 1984 Sandown 1000 was an endurance motor race staged at the Sandown Raceway in Victoria, Australia on 2 December 1984. It was the eleventh and final round of the 1984 FIA World Endurance Championship and was the first FIA World Championship race to be held in Australia. It was to be the first of a three-year contract to race at Sandown, though the final two years would be cancelled.

The event was the final round of the World Endurance Championship for Drivers but did not count towards the associated World Endurance Championship for Manufacturers, the Group C2 Prototype FIA Cup, or the FIA Grand Touring Cup. The race was open to Group C1 Sports Prototypes, Group C2 Sports Prototypes, Group B GT Cars and IMSA GTP, GTX, GTO & GTU cars. With their drivers no longer in a position to win the Drivers Championship and no manufacturers points on offer, the Martini Racing team did not participate in this event with their Ferrari powered Lancia LC2s.

An invitational class for "Australian Cars" (AC) was also included for cars that raced in the Australian GT Championship, and the Australian Sports Car Championship. These Group D GT, Group B Sports Sedan, and Group A Sports Cars, did not conform to World Endurance Championship regulations. The FIA only allowed five AC cars to compete and the drivers were not eligible to score championship points. Only four of these cars started, with the Bryan Thompson / Brad Jones Mercedes-Benz 450 SLC powered by a twin turbo, 4.2 litre Chevrolet V8 engine did not start due to overheating issues in practice and qualifying.

Fittingly in Australia's first ever FIA World Championship event, the race included Australia's only two World Drivers' Champions. Sir Jack Brabham (1959, 1960 & 1966) and Alan Jones (1980) both participated as part of the factory backed Rothmans Porsche team. The race was Sir Jack's first and only World Championship race since the 1970 Mexican Grand Prix, though between 1970 and 1984 he had been a semi-regular competitor in Australian touring car racing.

The race proved to be a financial disaster for promoters, the Light Car Club of Australia. The club failed to secure a major sponsor for the race, and were late in arranging a television deal so the race could be broadcast back to Europe. It wasn't until the last minute that the ABC decided to telecast the race (of Australia's major television stations, the Seven Network was committed to showing the 1984 Australian Open tennis from Kooyong in Melbourne, Channel 9 was showing a match between Victoria and the touring West Indies cricket team at the Melbourne Cricket Ground while Channel 10 was covering the Australian federal election). The official attendance was just 13,860, though many observers put the figure at less than 10,000. It was estimated that the LCCA lost anywhere from A$300,000 to 500,000 on the race.

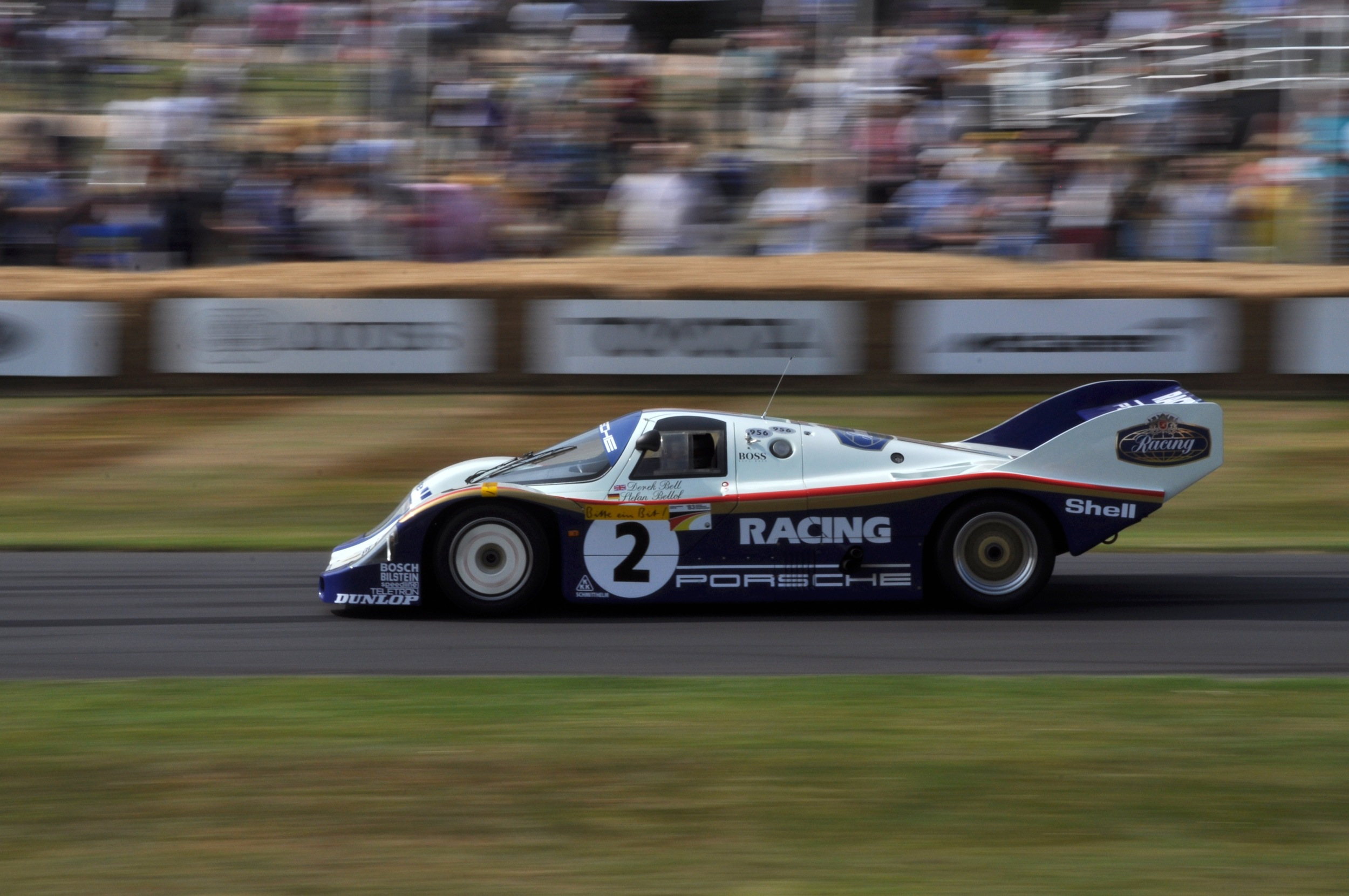
A Porsche 956, similar to the race winning car. (Image from 2013)

== Qualifying ==
As expected, the factory Rothmans Porsche 956 of Stefan Bellof took pole with a time of 1:31.600 (prior to the race, the lap record of the new 3.9 km circuit was 1:36.9 set by John Bowe in a 1.6 litre Ford powered Ralt RT4/85 Formula Mondial car during the final round of the 1984 Australian Drivers' Championship). Sharing the front row was his teammate and rival for the World Endurance Championship Jochen Mass with a lap of 1:32.300.

British driver Gordon Spice qualified 12th and was the fastest Group C2 runner with a time of 1:38.000 in his 3.3 litre Tiga CG84-Cosworth DFL.

Four times CAMS Gold Star winner, Melbourne resident Alfredo Costanzo, qualified the 1984 Australian Sports Car Championship winning Romano WE84-Cosworth he would share with car owner Bap Romano in 13th place and fastest of the AC class with a 1:38.400 lap, despite persistent understeer in the slow corners (due to 70 kg of lead ballast the car was required to carry for the race), Costanzo twice stripping second gear in the car and an overnight engine change from the 3.0 litre Cosworth DFV engine to a more powerful 3.9 litre Cosworth DFL.

In the only IMSA car in the field, American driver Jim Cook qualified 15th in Chuck Kendall's Lola T600-Chevrolet V8 with a 1:39.500, while Altfrid Heger qualified his Group B BMW M1 in 28th with a time of 1:50.500. The Group B BMW M1's (powered by the 3.5 litre BMW M88 Straight-six engine) actually proved slower than the production based Australian Group C touring cars had been at the circuit three months earlier, including being almost 3 seconds slower than the BMW 635 CSi touring car which used the same M88 engine.

=== Qualifying results ===
Pos.	Class	No	Entrant	Car	Time
Pole	C1	2	(West Germany) Rothmans Porsche	Porsche 956	1:31.600
2	C1	1	(West Germany) Rothmans Porsche	Porsche 956	1:32.300
3	C1	3	(West Germany) Rothmans Porsche	Porsche 956	1:32.400
4	C1	33	(United Kingdom) Skoal Bandit Porsche Team (United Kingdom) John Fitzpatrick Racing	Porsche 956B	1:32.600
5	C1	11	(West Germany) Porsche Kremer Racing	Porsche 956B	1:32.800
6	C1	14	(United Kingdom) GTi Engineering	Porsche 956 GTi	1:35.030
7	C1	7	(West Germany) New-Man Joest Racing	Porsche 956	1:32.900
8	C1	10	(West Germany) Porsche Kremer Racing	Porsche 956	1:33.600
9	C1	55	(United Kingdom) Skoal Bandit Porsche Team (United Kingdom) John Fitzpatrick Racing	Porsche 956	1:35.200
10	C1	12	(West Germany) Schornstein Racing Team (West Germany) Joest Racing	Porsche 956	1:36.000
11	C1	34	Team Australia (United Kingdom) John Fitzpatrick Racing	Porsche 962	1:36.000
12	C2	70	(United Kingdom) Spice-Tiga Racing	Tiga GC84 Ford-Cosworth	1:38.000
13	AC	61	(Australia) Bap Romano Racing	Romano WE84 Ford-Cosworth	1:38.400
14	C1	56	(West Germany) Rothmans Porsche (United Kingdom) GTi Engineering	Porsche 956	1:38.900
15	IMSA	131	(United States) Kendall Racing	Lola T600 Chevrolet	1:39.500
16	C1	17	(West Germany) Porsche Kremer Racing	Porsche-Kremer CK5	1:40.100
17	C2	80	(Italy) Scuderia Jolly Club	Alba AR2 Giannini	1:40.200
18	AC	64	(Australia) Re-Car Racing	Chevrolet Monza	1:40.300
19	C2	74	(West Germany) Gebhardt Motorsport	Gebhardt JC843 Ford-Cosworth	1:40.500
20	C2	72	(United Kingdom) ADA Engineering (West Germany) Gebhardt Motorsport	Gebhardt JC843 Ford-Cosworth	1:42.100
21	C2	81	(Italy) Scuderia Jolly Club	Alba AR2 Giannini	1:42.200
22	AC	62	(Australia) JPS Team BMW	BMW 320i	1:44.400
23	C2	73	(West Germany) Gebhardt Motorsport	Gebhardt JC842 BMW	1:44.600
24	C2	99	(West Germany) Gebhardt Motorsport	Tiga GC84 Ford	1:44.800
25	AC	65	(Australia) Jeff Harris	JWS C2 Mazda	1:46.600
26	AC	63	(Australia) Thomson-Fowler Motorsport	Mercedes-Benz 450 SLC Chevrolet	1:47.100
27	C2	90	Jens Winther Denmark	URD C81 BMW	1:47.200
28	B	106	(West Germany) Helmut Gall	BMW M1	1:50.500
29	B	83	(United Kingdom) Roger Andreason Racing	Lola T610 Ford-Cosworth	1:53.900
30	B	113	(United Kingdom) Strandell Racing	Porsche 930	1:55.700

== Race ==
Without the factory Lancia's, the Group C class turned into a Porsche benefit with the first 10 places on the grid being filled by the 956 model and position 11 being the newer Porsche 962 run by John Fitzpatrick Racing for Australia's "Mr Versatile" of motor racing Colin Bond, and open wheel driver Andrew Miedecke.

Alan Jones had the honour of leading the first lap of the race having got the jump on temporary teammates Bellof and Mass. As in qualifying, the race was a Porsche benefit with the German cars finishing in the top 9 places (the 962 of Bond/Miedecke finished 6th). Rothmans Porsche drivers Bellof and Derek Bell won the race, giving Bellof the 1984 World Endurance Championship in the process. Teammates Jochen Mass and Jacky Ickx finished three laps behind in 2nd, with Jonathan Palmer and Jan Lammers a further lap down in 3rd place in their Richard Lloyd Racing 956B. The only car to actually challenge the Rothmans Porsche's during the race, the Skoal Bandit 956B of Thierry Boutsen and David Hobbs, was the only Group C1 car not to finish after suffering a burnt-out an ignition coil on lap 171.

The first non-Porsche finisher was the Group C2, 3.3L Cosworth DFL powered Tiga GC84 of Gordon Spice and Neil Crang in 10th place. The Tiga won C2 after a race long battle with the Italian Alba's and the German Gebhardt JC843-Cosworth. The AC class was won by the JPS Team BMW's 320i of Jim Richards and Tony Longhurst who finished in 14th place overall despite several spins and punctures caused by the road surface in the new infield section breaking up under the strain of the 650 bhp (485 kW; 659 PS) ground effect Group C Porsche's. The BMW was followed in 15th place by the Group B winning BMW M1 of Helmut Gall and Altfrid Heger. The only IMSA car in the race, a Lola T600-Chevrolet run by Chuck Kendall failed to finish having completed 95 laps.

The race distance was to be 257 laps, or 1000 km (620 mi) long. However, under WEC rules, with the exception of the 24 Hours of Le Mans, races had a time limit of 6 hours. The six-hour mark was reached when the Bellof/Bell Porsche had run only 206 laps (803.4 km), thus the race was declared at the time limit some 51 laps (197.78 km or 122.89 mi) short of the 1000 km distance.

== Official results ==
Pos	Class	No	Team	Drivers	Chassis	Tyre	Laps
Pos	Class	No	Team	Drivers	Engine	Tyre	Laps
1	C1	2	(West Germany) Rothmans Porsche	(West Germany) Stefan Bellof (United Kingdom) Derek Bell	Porsche 956	D	206
1	C1	2	(West Germany) Rothmans Porsche	(West Germany) Stefan Bellof (United Kingdom) Derek Bell	Porsche Type-935 2.6L Turbo Flat-6	D	206
2	C1	1	(West Germany) Rothmans Porsche	(West Germany) Jochen Mass (Belgium) Jacky Ickx	Porsche 956	D	203
2	C1	1	(West Germany) Rothmans Porsche	(West Germany) Jochen Mass (Belgium) Jacky Ickx	Porsche Type-935 2.6L Turbo Flat-6	D	203
3	C1	14	(United Kingdom) GTi Engineering	(United Kingdom) Jonathan Palmer (Netherlands) Jan Lammers	Porsche 956 GTi	D	202
3	C1	14	(United Kingdom) GTi Engineering	(United Kingdom) Jonathan Palmer (Netherlands) Jan Lammers	Porsche Type-935 2.6L Turbo Flat-6	D	202
4	C1	10	(West Germany) Porsche Kremer Racing	(South Africa) Sarel van der Merwe (South Africa) George Fouché	Porsche 956	G	200
4	C1	10	(West Germany) Porsche Kremer Racing	(South Africa) Sarel van der Merwe (South Africa) George Fouché	Porsche Type-935 2.6L Turbo Flat-6	G	200
5	C1	11	(West Germany) Porsche Kremer Racing	(West Germany) Manfred Winkelhock (Australia) Rusty French	Porsche 956B	G	200
5	C1	11	(West Germany) Porsche Kremer Racing	(West Germany) Manfred Winkelhock (Australia) Rusty French	Porsche Type-935 2.6L Turbo Flat-6	G	200
6	C1	34	Team Australia (United Kingdom) John Fitzpatrick Racing	(Australia) Colin Bond (Australia) Andrew Miedecke	Porsche 962	D	198
6	C1	34	Team Australia (United Kingdom) John Fitzpatrick Racing	(Australia) Colin Bond (Australia) Andrew Miedecke	Porsche Type-935 2.6L Turbo Flat-6	D	198
7	C1	7	(West Germany) New-Man Joest Racing	(West Germany) Klaus Ludwig (France) Henri Pescarolo	Porsche 956	D	197
7	C1	7	(West Germany) New-Man Joest Racing	(West Germany) Klaus Ludwig (France) Henri Pescarolo	Porsche Type-935 2.6L Turbo Flat-6	D	197
8	C1	3	(West Germany) Rothmans Porsche	(Australia) Vern Schuppan (Australia) Alan Jones	Porsche 956	D	196
8	C1	3	(West Germany) Rothmans Porsche	(Australia) Vern Schuppan (Australia) Alan Jones	Porsche Type-935 2.6L Turbo Flat-6	D	196
9	C1	55	(United Kingdom) Skoal Bandit Porsche Team (United Kingdom) John Fitzpatrick Racing	(United Kingdom) Rupert Keegan (Austria) Franz Konrad	Porsche 956	G	194
9	C1	55	(United Kingdom) Skoal Bandit Porsche Team (United Kingdom) John Fitzpatrick Racing	(United Kingdom) Rupert Keegan (Austria) Franz Konrad	Porsche Type-935 2.6L Turbo Flat-6	G	194
10	C2	70	(United Kingdom) Spice-Tiga Racing	(United Kingdom) Gordon Spice (Australia) Neil Crang	Tiga GC84	A	189
10	C2	70	(United Kingdom) Spice-Tiga Racing	(United Kingdom) Gordon Spice (Australia) Neil Crang	Ford Cosworth DFL 3.3L V8	A	189
11	C1	12	(West Germany) Schornstein Racing Team (West Germany) Joest Racing	(West Germany) "John Winter" (West Germany) Dieter Schornstein (France) Paul Belmondo	Porsche 956	D	184
11	C1	12	(West Germany) Schornstein Racing Team (West Germany) Joest Racing	(West Germany) "John Winter" (West Germany) Dieter Schornstein (France) Paul Belmondo	Porsche Type-935 2.6L Turbo Flat-6	D	184
12	C2	74	(West Germany) Gebhardt Motorsport	(West Germany) Frank Jelinski (West Germany) Beate Nodes (West Germany) Günter Gebhardt	Gebhardt JC843	A	181
12	C2	74	(West Germany) Gebhardt Motorsport	(West Germany) Frank Jelinski (West Germany) Beate Nodes (West Germany) Günter Gebhardt	Ford Cosworth DFL 3.3L V8	A	181
13	C1	17	(West Germany) Porsche Kremer Racing	(Netherlands) Kees Kroesemeijer (New Zealand) Peter Janson (Spain) Jesús Pareja	Porsche-Kremer CK5	D	179
13	C1	17	(West Germany) Porsche Kremer Racing	(Netherlands) Kees Kroesemeijer (New Zealand) Peter Janson (Spain) Jesús Pareja	Porsche Type-935 2.8L Turbo Flat-6	D	179
14	AC	62	(Australia) JPS Team BMW	(New Zealand) Jim Richards (Australia) Tony Longhurst	BMW 320i	Y	178
14	AC	62	(Australia) JPS Team BMW	(New Zealand) Jim Richards (Australia) Tony Longhurst	BMW M10 2.0L I4	Y	178
15	B	106	(West Germany) Helmut Gall	(West Germany) Helmut Gall (West Germany) Altfrid Heger	BMW M1	D	170
15	B	106	(West Germany) Helmut Gall	(West Germany) Helmut Gall (West Germany) Altfrid Heger	BMW M88 3.5L I6	D	170
16	C2	99	(United Kingdom) JQF Engineering	(United Kingdom) Jeremy Rossiter (United Kingdom) Roy Baker (United Kingdom) Gary Evans	Tiga GC284	?	156
16	C2	99	(United Kingdom) JQF Engineering	(United Kingdom) Jeremy Rossiter (United Kingdom) Roy Baker (United Kingdom) Gary Evans	Ford Cosworth BDT 1.7L Turbo I4	?	156
NC	C2	83	(United Kingdom) Roger Andreason Racing	(United Kingdom) Richard Jones (United Kingdom) Don Burroughs (United Kingdom) John Bartlett	Lola T610	A	120
NC	C2	83	(United Kingdom) Roger Andreason Racing	(United Kingdom) Richard Jones (United Kingdom) Don Burroughs (United Kingdom) John Bartlett	Ford Cosworth DFL 3.3L V8	A	120
NC	C1	56	(West Germany) Rothmans Porsche (United Kingdom) GTi Engineering	(United Kingdom) Johnny Dumfries (Australia) Jack Brabham (United Kingdom) Richard Lloyd	Porsche 956	D	108
NC	C1	56	(West Germany) Rothmans Porsche (United Kingdom) GTi Engineering	(United Kingdom) Johnny Dumfries (Australia) Jack Brabham (United Kingdom) Richard Lloyd	Porsche Type-935 2.6L Turbo Flat-6	D	108
NC	AC	61	(Australia) Bap Romano Racing	(Australia) Bap Romano (Australia) Alfredo Costanzo	Romano WE84	A	106
NC	AC	61	(Australia) Bap Romano Racing	(Australia) Bap Romano (Australia) Alfredo Costanzo	Ford Cosworth DFL 3.9L V8	A	106
DNF	C1	33	(United Kingdom) Skoal Bandit Porsche Team (United Kingdom) John Fitzpatrick Racing	(Belgium) Thierry Boutsen (United Kingdom) David Hobbs	Porsche 956B	G	171
DNF	C1	33	(United Kingdom) Skoal Bandit Porsche Team (United Kingdom) John Fitzpatrick Racing	(Belgium) Thierry Boutsen (United Kingdom) David Hobbs	Porsche Type-935 2.6L Turbo Flat-6	G	171
DNF	AC	65	(Australia) Jeff Harris	(Australia) Jeff Harris (Australia) Ray Hanger (Australia) Barry Jones	JWS C2	A	114
DNF	AC	65	(Australia) Jeff Harris	(Australia) Jeff Harris (Australia) Ray Hanger (Australia) Barry Jones	Mazda 13B 1.3L 2-Rotor Turbo	A	114
DNF	C2	81	(Italy) Scuderia Jolly Club	(Italy) Guido Daccò (Australia) Lucio Cesario	Alba AR2	A	114
DNF	C2	81	(Italy) Scuderia Jolly Club	(Italy) Guido Daccò (Australia) Lucio Cesario	Giannini Carma FF 2.0L Turbo I4	A	114
DNF	C2	73	(West Germany) Gebhardt Motorsport	(France) Cathy Muller (Australia) Sue Ransom (United States) Margie Smith-Haas	Gebhardt JC842	A	95
DNF	C2	73	(West Germany) Gebhardt Motorsport	(France) Cathy Muller (Australia) Sue Ransom (United States) Margie Smith-Haas	BMW M88 3.5L I6	A	95
DNF	IMSA	131	(United States) Kendall Racing	(United States) Chuck Kendall (United States) Jim Cook (Australia) Peter Fitzgerald	Lola T600	?	95
DNF	IMSA	131	(United States) Kendall Racing	(United States) Chuck Kendall (United States) Jim Cook (Australia) Peter Fitzgerald	Chevrolet 5.8L V8	?	95
DNF	C2	80	(Italy) Scuderia Jolly Club	(Italy) Martino Finotto (Italy) Carlo Facetti (Italy) Guido Daccò	Alba AR2	A	91
DNF	C2	80	(Italy) Scuderia Jolly Club	(Italy) Martino Finotto (Italy) Carlo Facetti (Italy) Guido Daccò	Giannini Carma FF 2.0L Turbo I4	A	91
DNF	C2	72	(United Kingdom) ADA Engineering (Germany) Gebhardt Motorsport	(United Kingdom) Ian Harrower (New Zealand) Neville Crichton (Australia) Richard Davison	Gebhardt JC843	?	64
DNF	C2	72	(United Kingdom) ADA Engineering (Germany) Gebhardt Motorsport	(United Kingdom) Ian Harrower (New Zealand) Neville Crichton (Australia) Richard Davison	Ford Cosworth DFL 3.3L V8	?	64
DNF	C2	90	Jens Winther Denmark	(Denmark) Jens Winther (Denmark) Lars Viggo-Jensen	URD C81	A	42
DNF	C2	90	Jens Winther Denmark	(Denmark) Jens Winther (Denmark) Lars Viggo-Jensen	BMW M88 3.5L I6	A	42
DNF	B	113	(United Kingdom) Strandell Racing	(United Kingdom) Nick Faure (Sweden) Kenneth Leim (United Kingdom) Peter Clark	Porsche 930	?	0
DNF	B	113	(United Kingdom) Strandell Racing	(United Kingdom) Nick Faure (Sweden) Kenneth Leim (United Kingdom) Peter Clark	Porsche 3.3L Turbo Flat-6	?	0
DSQ	AC	64	(Australia) Re-Car Racing	(Australia) Allan Grice (Australia) Dick Johnson (Australia) Ron Harrop	Chevrolet Monza	D	114
DSQ	AC	64	(Australia) Re-Car Racing	(Australia) Allan Grice (Australia) Dick Johnson (Australia) Ron Harrop	Chevrolet 6.0L V8	D	114
DNS	AC	63	(Australia) Thomson-Fowler Motorsport	(Australia) Bryan Thomson (Australia) Brad Jones	Mercedes-Benz 450 SLC	A	-
DNS	AC	63	(Australia) Thomson-Fowler Motorsport	(Australia) Bryan Thomson (Australia) Brad Jones	Chevrolet 4.2L Twin Turbo V8	A	-
DNA	C1	16	(Australia) Terry Hook	(Australia) Terry Hook (Australia) Warwick Brown	Lola T610	?	-
DNA	C1	16	(Australia) Terry Hook	(Australia) Terry Hook (Australia) Warwick Brown	Chevrolet 6.0L V8	?	-

Note: Cars that failed to complete 75% of the winner's distance were Not Classified and are marked as NC in the above table.

== Statistics ==
- Group C Pole Position - Stefan Bellof - #2 Porsche 956 - 1:31.600
- Group C2 Pole Position - Gordon Spice - #70 Tiga CG84 Cosworth - 1:38.000
- AC Pole Position - Alfredo Costanzo - #61 Romano WE84 Cosworth - 1:38.400
- IMSA GTP Pole Position - Jim Cook - #131 Lola T600 Chevrolet - 1:39.500
- Group B Pole Position - Helmut Gall - #106 BMW M1 - 1:50.500
- Fastest Lap - Stefan Bellof - #2 Porsche 956 - 1:34.500
- Average Speed - 166.468 km/h

World Sportscar Championship
Previous race: 1984 1000km of Kyalami	1984 season	Next race: None
