= 1986 Australian Sports Car Championship =

Seasons
- ← 1985 1987 →

The 1986 Australian Sports Car Championship was a CAMS sanctioned Australian motor racing title for drivers of Group A Sports Cars. It was the 18th Australian Sports Car Championship.

The championship was won by former open wheel star and twice Australian Drivers' Champion John Bowe driving the 5.8 litre Chevrolet powered Veskanda C1 built by K&A Engineering in Adelaide. Bowe dominated the five round series winning all seven races, scoring fastest lap in each race (including outright lap records at Surfers Paradise and Calder) and pole position at each round. Terry Hook finished in 2nd place in his Lola T610 Chevrolet with reigning champion Chris Clearihan 3rd in his JWS-Kaditcha Chevrolet.

1984 Australian Sports Car Champion Bap Romano crashed his Cosworth DFL powered Romano WE84 heavily in the opening round at Sydney's tight Amaroo Park circuit. The WE84's throttle stuck wide open on the run up Bitupave Hill just past the pits and Romano was unable to slow the car, eventually destroying the front of the car in the tyre barriers. Romano himself broke both legs in the crash but was fully conscious when pulled out of the car. The crash ended the Romano WE84's racing life which had begun in 1983 as a Kaditcha K583.

== Calendar ==
The championship was contested over a five-round series.

Round	Circuit	State	Date	Format	Race winner(s)	Round winner	Car
1	Oran Park	New South Wales	23 March	Two heats	John Bowe; John Bowe	John Bowe	Veskanda C1 Chevrolet
2	Adelaide International Raceway	South Australia	6 July	One race	John Bowe	John Bowe	Veskanda C1 Chevrolet
3	Surfers Paradise International Raceway	Queensland	24 August	Two heats	John Bowe; John Bowe	John Bowe	Veskanda C1 Chevrolet
4	Sandown International Motor Racing Circuit	Victoria	14 September	One race	John Bowe	John Bowe	Veskanda C1 Chevrolet
5	Calder Park Raceway	Victoria	19 October	One race	John Bowe	John Bowe	Veskanda C1 Chevrolet

== Classes ==
Cars competed in three classes according to engine capacity: In 1986 CAMS relaxed the previous 5000cc engine limit for the Over 3 litre cars and allowed engines of up to 6000cc.

- Up to 1.6 litres
- 1.6 to 3 litres
- Over 3 litres

== Points system ==
Championship points were awarded to the top twenty outright race positions, based on the following three tier structure:

Outright position	1	2	3	4	5	6	7	8	9	10	11	12	13	14	15	16	17	18	19	20
Up to 1.6 litres	30	27	24	21	19	17	15	14	13	12	11	10	9	8	7	6	5	4	3	2
1.6 to 3 litres	28	26	23	20	17	15	14	13	12	11	10	9	8	7	6	5	4	3	2	1
Over 3 litres	25	23	20	17	15	13	11	10	9	8	7	6	5	4	3	2	1	-	-	-

For rounds contested over multiple heats, the aggregate points achieved by each driver were divided by the number of heats to arrive at the driver's championship points allocations for the round.

== Results ==
Top 10 results only.

Position	Driver	No.	Car	Entrant	Class	Rd1	Rd2	Rd3	Rd4	Rd5	Total
1	John Bowe	25	Veskanda C1 Chevrolet	Bernard van Elsen	Over 3 litre	25	25	25	25	25	125
2	Terry Hook	15	Lola T610 Chevrolet	Terry Hook	Over 3 litre	-	23	21.5	23	23	90.5
3	Chris Clearihan	1	JWS-Kaditcha K582 Chevrolet	Chris Clearihan	Over 3 litre	20	20	21.5	-	20	82.5
4	Andrew Roberts	42	Roberts SR3 Ford	Andrew Roberts	Up to 1.6 litres	19	-	18	13	13	63
5	Ray Hanger	5	Rennmax BN6 Ford	Ray Hanger	Up to 1.6 litres & 1.6 to 3 litres	20	13	-	-	17	50
6	Rowan Harman	7	Kaditcha SR781 Mazda	Rowan Harman	1.6 to 3 litres	6.5	15	13	-	14	48.5
7	Geoff Munday	9	JWS C2 Chevrolet	Geoff Munday	Over 3 litre	-	15	16	15	-	46
8	Bob Jolly	3	Holden VK Commodore Chevrolet	Bob Jolly	Over 3 litre	-	-	-	20	17	37
9	Bernie Van Elsen	14	Bolwell Nagari Ford	Bernard van Elsen	Over 3 litre	-	17	-	4	10	31
=10	Mike Ceveri	18	Holden Torana Chevrolet	Lusty Engineering	Over 3 litre						23
=10	Bap Romano	8	Romano WE84 Cosworth	Bap Romano Racing	Over 3 litre						23
