= Winton Motor Raceway =

Motorsport track in Victoria, Australia

- National Circuit (1997–present)

- Original Club Circuit (1961–present)
- Location: Winton, Victoria
- Coordinates: 36°31′6″S 146°5′15″E
- FIA Grade: 3 (Note: Winton Motor Raceway's Grade 3 licence expired 1 June 2022.)
- Owner: Benalla Auto Club
- Broke ground: November 1960; 65 years ago
- Opened: 26 November 1961; 64 years ago
- Major events: Current: Australian Formula Ford Championship (1971, 1983–1994, 1998–1999, 2002–2004, 2007, 2009–2019, 2021–present); AU4 Championship (2018, 2026); Former: Supercars Championship; Winton SuperSprint (1985–1986, 1988–1995, 1997–2004, 2006–2019, 2022); Australian Drivers' Championship (1980, 1982–1984, 1986, 1989–1990, 1992, 1994, 1997, 1999–2004, 2009, 2011, 2024–2025); S5000 (2023); Trans-Am Australia (2023); TCR Australia (2019, 2023); Australian GT (1982–1985, 2011–2012, 2016–2017)

National Circuit (1997–present)
- Length: 3.000 km (1.864 mi)
- Turns: 12
- Race lap record: 1:14.3058 ( (Australia) John Magro, Dallara F311, 2019, F3)

Original Club Circuit (1961–present)
- Length: 2.028 km (1.260 mi)
- Turns: 10
- Race lap record: 0:52.9900 ( (Australia) Mark Larkham, Reynard 90D, 1992, Formula Brabham)

Winton Motor Raceway is a motor racing track in Winton, near Benalla, Victoria, Australia.

== History ==
The Benalla Auto Club began planning for a permanent racing track around 1958, as a replacement for their existing track at Barjarg. In 1960 it was decided to build the track at Winton Recreation Reserve and the track was completed in twelve months. The circuit hosted its first race meeting on 26 November 1961. The circuit was immediately popular - a March 1965 meeting featuring the Neptune touring car and the Victorian Formula Two championship drew a crowd of approximately 10,000 spectators. The circuit length was extended prior to the 1997 round of the V8 Supercar championship and the upgrade included a new pit complex.

== The circuit ==
Winton Motor Raceway has a combination of long fast straights and twisty and tight bends. It is also known as "Australia's Action Track". Dick Johnson once described the circuit being "like running a marathon around your clothes-line".

The original circuit (now called the Winton Club Circuit) is 2.028 km (1.260 mi) in length and comprises 10 turns. The circuit was lengthened to 3.000 km (1.864 mi) with the cars turning left prior to the esses and a series of right hand turns added before the extension rejoins the original track at the esses. The long circuit is called the Winton National Circuit.

== V8 Supercars ==
The track was used as a round in the V8 Supercar series, hosting the Winton SuperSprint. The track was one of the more popular tracks in the series with spectators, especially those who live in the area. Easy access to the track and viewing areas made it very popular. It attracts some of the biggest crowds of any of the permanent race tracks in the series.

Although the circuit held various rounds of national championships such as the Australian Drivers' Championship and the Australian Sports Car Championship, Winton was not awarded a round of the Australian Touring Car Championship until the start of the Group A era in Australia in 1985. The first ATCC race was won by then triple-Bathurst 1000 winner Jim Richards in his JPS Team BMW 635 CSi. That race holds its place in ATCC/V8 Supercar history as not only the first all-Group A race in Australia, but the first ATCC win by BMW and the only race in history in which there were no Holdens on the grid.

Richards holds the record for most ATCC round wins at Winton with four, having won in 1985 and 1986 for BMW, while winning in 1990 and 1991 for Nissan.

== Australian Drivers' Championship ==
Winton has played host to 19 rounds of the Australian Drivers' Championship since 1980.

Year	Driver	Car	Entrant
Australian Formula 1
1980	(Australia) Alfredo Costanzo	Lola T430	Porsche Distributors
1982	(Australia) Alfredo Costanzo	Tiga FA81	Porsche Cars Australia
1983	(Australia) Alfredo Costanzo	Tiga FA81	Porsche Cars Australia
Formula Mondial
1984	(Australia) John Bowe	Ralt RT4	Chris Leach Racing
1986	(New Zealand) Ken Smith	Ralt RT4	Watson Motor Racing Pty Ltd
Formula Holden
1989*	(Australia) Rohan Onslow	Ralt RT20	R.J.Macarthur Onslow
1989*	(Australia) John Briggs	Ralt RT21	John Briggs
1990	(Australia) John Briggs	Ralt RT21	John Briggs
Formula Brabham
1992	(Australia) Mark Larkham	Reynard 90D	Larkham Motor Sport
1994	(Australia) Paul Stokell	Reynard 90D	Birrana Racing
Formula Holden
1997	(Australia) Jason Bargwanna	Reynard 92D	SH Racing
1999	(New Zealand) Simon Wills	Reynard 94D	SH Racing
2000	(Australia) Tim Leahey	Reynard 92D	Greg Murphy Racing
2001	(Australia) Paul Stokell	Reynard 94D	Birrana Racing
2002	(Australia) Will Power	Reynard 94D	Ralt Australia
2003	(Australia) Paul Trengove	Reynard 95D	CPA Australia
2004	(Australia) Rob Nguyen	Reynard 97D	Hocking Motorsport
Australian Formula 3
2009**	(Australia) Tim Macrow (United Kingdom) Joey Foster	Dallara F307	Scud Racing; Team BRM
2011	(United Kingdom) James Winslow	Dallara F304	R-Tek Motorsport

* The 1989 Australian Drivers' Championship was contested over ten rounds at five race meetings at five different tracks. Although the races were held on the same day both Rohan Onslow and John Briggs are credited with separate round wins.
**The 2009 round saw two heats. Tim Macrow and Joey Foster each won a heat while also finished second on the other heat giving the pair equal points (35) on the day.

== Australian Sports Car Championship ==
Winton played host to a round of the Australian Sports Car Championship on 7 occasions between 1978 and 1985.

Year	Driver	Car	Entrant
1978	(Australia) Ross Mathiesen	Porsche Carrera	Ross Mathiesen
1979	(Australia) Ross Mathiesen	Porsche Carrera	Ross Mathiesen
1980	(Canada) Allan Moffat	Porsche 930 Turbo	Porsche Distributors
1981	(Australia) John Latham	Porsche 930 Turbo	John Latham
1983	(Australia) Bap Romano	Kaditcha K583 Cosworth	Kaditcha Factory Racing Team
1984	(Australia) Bap Romano	Romano WE84 Cosworth	Bap Romano Racing
1985	(Australia) Terry Hook	Lola T610	Terry Hook

== Australian Sports Sedan / GT Championship ==
1980, 1981, 1997, 1998 and 2003 were run for Sports Sedans. 1982–1985 were run for GT style cars.

Year	Driver	Car	Entrant
1980	(New Zealand) Jim Richards	Ford XC Falcon Hardtop	Jim Richards
1981	(Australia) Tony Edmondson	Alfa Romeo Alfetta GTV Chevrolet	Donald Elliott
1982	(Australia) Alan Jones	Porsche 935/80	Porsche Cars Australia
1983	(Australia) Tony Edmondson	Alfa Romeo Alfetta GTV Chevrolet	Donald Elliott
1984	(Australia) Allan Grice	Chevrolet Monza	Re-Car Racing
1985	(Australia) Kevin Bartlett	De Tomaso Pantera	Paul Halstead / The Toy Shop
1997	(Australia) Wayne Park	Mazda RX-7	Wayne Park
1998	(Australia) Tony Ricciardello	Alfa Romeo Alfetta GTV Chevrolet	Basil Ricciardello
2003	(Australia) Darren Hossack	Saab 9-3 Aero Chevrolet	Darren Hossack

== Australian Nations Cup Championship ==
Year	Driver	Car	Entrant
2002	(Australia) Paul Stokell	Lamborghini Diablo GTR	Team Lamborghini Australia
2003	(Australia) Nathan Pretty	Holden Monaro 427C	Garry Rogers Motorsport
2004	(Australia) Nathan Pretty	Holden Monaro 427C	Garry Rogers Motorsport

== Australian Superbike Championship ==
Winton Raceway is one of the most prominent Superbike races on the Australian Superbike Championship racing calendar. Winton Raceway has seen riders such as Mick Doohan, Kevin Magee and Mat Mladin ride regularly at the venue.

Year	Rider	Bike
2007	(Australia) Jamie Stauffer	Yamaha YZF-R1
2006	(Australia) Jamie Stauffer	Yamaha YZF-R1

Formula X-treme Motorcycle Championship

Year	Rider	Bike
2009	(Australia) Craig Coxhell	Honda CBR1000RR
2010	(Australia) Kevin Curtain	Yamaha YZF-R1

== Drift Attack ==
Winton Raceway is one of Australia's most popular Drift circuits. It hosts Australia largest drift event Drift Attack. Drift Attack is promoted by the Victorian Drift Club and offers the largest Prize Pool in Australian Drifting and is contested by Australia's 32 best Drifters in the Pro class and 32 Drivers in the street class.

Year	Driver	Car
2009	Luke Fink	S14 Silvia
2010	Josh Coote	Nissan 180SX

== Events ==
Current

- May: AU4 Australian Championship, Historic Winton
- July: Winton Festival of Speed
- August: Winton 300
- September: Hi-Tec Oils Super Series, TA2 Racing Muscle Car Series, Australian Formula Ford Championship, Australian Production Car Series
- November: David Lowe Memorial

Former

- Aussie Racing Cars (2002–2004, 2008–2009, 2011, 2013, 2018, 2022)
- Australian Drivers' Championship (1980, 1982–1984, 1986, 1989–1990, 1992, 1994, 1997, 1999–2004, 2009, 2011, 2024–2025)
- Australian GT Championship (1982–1985, 2011–2012, 2016–2017)
- Australian GT Production Car Championship (1994, 1996–1999, 2001–2002)
- Australian Improved Production Nationals (1991–1992)
- Australian motorcycle Grand Prix (1987)
- Australian National Trans-Am Series (2023)
- Australian Nations Cup Championship (2002–2004)
- Australian Sports Car Championship (1978–1985)
- Australian Super Touring Championship (1993–1999, 2001)
- Australian Superbike Championship (1992, 1998–2008, 2017–2019, 2021)
- Porsche Carrera Cup Australia Championship (2003–2004, 2007, 2013, 2022)
- S5000 Australian Drivers' Championship (2023)
- Supercars Championship
  - Winton SuperSprint (1985–1986, 1988–1995, 1997–2004, 2006–2019, 2022)
- SuperUtes Series (2018–2019, 2022)
- TCR Australia Touring Car Series (2019, 2023)
- V8 Ute Racing Series (2002–2004, 2008–2010, 2012, 2016–2017)

== Lap records ==
As of May 2026, the official race lap records at Winton Motor Raceway are listed as:

Category	Time	Driver	Vehicle	Date
National Circuit (1997–present): 3.000 km (1.864 mi)
Formula 3	1:14.3058	(Australia) John Magro	Dallara F311	10 March 2019
Formula Holden	1:14.5697	(Singapore) Christian Murchison	Reynard 95D	16 July 2000
Formula Hyper Racer	1:17.501	(Australia) Hayden Crossland	Hyper Racer X1	11 August 2024
S5000	1:18.1659	(Australia) Joey Mawson	Ligier JS F3-S5000	11 June 2023
Sports Sedan	1:18.8794	(Australia) Jordan Caruso	Audi A4	21 May 2022
Australian Sports Racer	1:19.000	(Australia) Roger I'Anson	West WR1000	June 2016
Superbike	1:19.274	(Australia) Troy Herfoss	Honda CBR1000RR	14 March 2021
Supercars Championship	1:19.7092	(New Zealand) Fabian Coulthard	Ford FG X Falcon	21 May 2016
Formula 4	1:20.4026	(Australia) Jensen Marold	Tatuus F4-T421	2 May 2026
GT3	1:20.4298	(Australia) Jake Fouracre	Audi R8 LMS GT3	10 June 2017
Porsche Carrera Cup	1:20.7969	(New Zealand) Callum Hedge	Porsche 911 (992 I) GT3 Cup	21 May 2022
Supersport	1:21.872	(Australia) Tom Edwards	Yamaha YZF-R6	14 March 2021
V8 Touring Car National Series	1:23.3446	(Australia) Taz Douglas	Holden VE Commodore	22 May 2016
Super2 Series	1:23.7669	(Australia) Steve Owen	Ford FG Falcon	5 April 2014
Nations Cup	1:23.8403	(Australia) Paul Stokell	Lamborghini Diablo GTR	21 September 2003
TCR Touring Car	1:24.372	(Australia) Will Brown	Hyundai i30 N TCR	1 September 2019
Trans-Am Australia	1:24.5162	(Australia) Brett Holdsworth	Chevrolet Camaro	10 June 2023
Formula Ford (Duratec)	1:24.7731	(Australia) James Piszcyk	Mygale SJ13	22 May 2022
Super Touring	1:25.3181	(New Zealand) Jim Richards	Volvo S40	9 August 1998
Formula Ford (Kent)	1:26.2188	(Australia) Jamie Whincup	Van Diemen RF01	18 August 2002
Touring Car Masters	1:28.0049	(Australia) John Bowe	Holden LH Torana SL/R 5000	22 May 2016
Sidecar	1:29.112	(Australia) Corey Turner/ (Australia) Danyon Turner	Suzuki LCR	13 March 2021
Supersport 300	1:30.604	(Australia) Carter Thompson	Yamaha YZF-R3	14 March 2021
Aussie Racing Cars	1:31.2640	(Australia) Tom Hayman	Mustang-Yamaha	21 May 2022
Moto3	1:32.543	(Australia) Dylan Whiteside	Honda NSF250R	2 October 2016
Formula Vee	1:32.6485	(Australia) Blaine Grills	Sabre 02	4 September 2016
GT Performance	1:32.6533	(Australia) Bob Pearson	Mazda RX-7 Series 8	21 September 2003
F2 Sidecar	1:33.757	(Australia) Terry Goldie/ (Australia) Jamie Crass	LCR - Honda CBR600RR	30 April 2017
Porsche 944	1:33.9462	(Australia) Cameron Beller	Porsche 944	2 September 2018
SuperUtes (V8)	1:34.4853	(Australia) David Sieders	Mitsubishi Triton	22 May 2022
V8 Ute Racing Series	1:35.2253	(Australia) Kim Jane	Holden VE SS Ute	21 May 2016
Motor Events	1:38.9840	(New Zealand) John Bermingham	BMW E36 328	15 May 2021
24 Hours of Lemons	1:40.4680	(New Zealand) John Bermingham	BMW E36 328	27 April 2019
SuperUtes (Diesel)	1:42.9017	(New Zealand) Tom Alexander	Holden Colorado	20 May 2018
Original Club Circuit (1961–present): 2.028 km (1.260 mi)
Formula Brabham	0.52.99	(Australia) Mark Larkham	Reynard 90D	4 April 1992
Formula Mondial	0.53.80	(Australia) John Bowe	Ralt RT4	12 August 1984
Formula X1 Hyper Racer	0.54.91	(Australia) Dean Crooke	Hyper Racer X1	10 July 2022
Formula 5000	0.55.80	(Australia) Alfredo Costanzo	Lola T430	October 1979
Formula 2	0.56.96	(Australia) Arthur Abrahams	Cheetah Mk 8	December 1988
Group A Sports Cars (Under 3-Litre)	0.57.10	(Australia) Bap Romano	Kaditcha K583 Cosworth	14 August 1983
Group A Sports Cars (Over 3-Litre)	0.57.40	(Australia) Peter Hopwood	Kaditcha Chevrolet	14 August 1983
Sports Sedan	0.58.80	(Australia) Tony Edmondson	Alfa Romeo Alfetta GTV	12 August 1984
Group 5	0.59.00	(Australia) Alan Jones	Porsche 935/80	16 May 1982
Clubman	0.59.60	(Australia) Grant Taylor	Galloway	December 1987
Group 3A Touring Car	0.59.65	(Australia) Glenn Seton	Ford EB Falcon	16 May 1993
Superbikes	1:00.7655	(Australia) Kirk McCarthy	Honda RVF750 RC45	May 1995
Super Touring	1:00.972	(Australia) Geoff Brabham	BMW 318is	25 August 1996
Formula Ford	1:01.18	(Australia) John Blanchard	Swift SC92F	5 April 1992
Group A	1:01.56	(Australia) Mark Skaife	Nissan Skyline R32 GT-R	5 April 1992
GT Production	1:02.3751	(Australia) Peter Fitzgerald	Porsche 911 RSCS	25 August 1996
Porsche 944	1:05.0137	(Australia) Chris Lewis-Williams	Porsche 944	4 December 2016
Formula Vee	1:07.01	(Australia) Adrian Wilkinson	Elfin 76	March 1996
Group 3E Series Production Cars	1:09.42	(Australia) Terry Bosnjak	Holden VP Commodore	16 May 1993
Truck racing	1:14.0430	(Australia) Steven Zammit	Kenworth T401	11 August 2024
