= Chris Clearihan =

Australian racing driver (born 1949)

- Nationality: (Australia) Australian
- Full name: Christopher Alfred Clearihan
- Born: 10 September 1949 (age 77) Griffith, NSW, Australia

Previous series
- 1982 1982-88 1984 1987 1992 1993 2003-05: Australian Formula Ford; Australian Sports Car Championship; ATCC; WTCC; Australian Drivers' Championship; Indonesian Grand Prix; Aussie Racing Cars

Championship titles
- 1982, 1985: Australian Sports Car Championship

Christopher Alfred Clearihan (born 10 September 1949) is an Australian motor racing driver and Air Race pilot.

== Motor racing ==
Clearihan's first race car was the Canon Bolwell Nagari. It was with this car, previously operated by Terry Spooner, that he showed up at Oran Park, Toby-Lee Series in 1972. With an audience of 20,000 people, Clearihan claimed his first win. He then continued to win production sports car races in the Nagari, establishing a name for himself. Clearihan then bought a Formula Ford open-wheeled Elfin and proceeded to win the TAA Driver to Europe Formula Ford race in rainy conditions at Surfers Paradise.

Clearihan won two Australian Sports Car Championships in 1982, and 1985 (while finishing second in 1984 and third in 1983, 1986 and 1988), in addition to various state titles, the Pie Series and Scratch Races at Amaroo Park in Sydney. He finished in the top-ten in the Bathurst 1000, and eighth in the 1988 Indonesian Grand Prix. He competed consistently between 1986–92. After purchasing the Tony Edmondson Alfa Romeo Alfetta-Chevrolet Sports Sedan, Clearihan spent the next ten years breaking all lap records.

At the 1984 Castrol 500 touring car race at the Sandown Raceway in Melbourne, Clearihan, who was to have co-driven with David Grose in a Mazda RX-7, was excluded from the meeting after qualifying following an altercation in the pits with Allan Moffat. Moffat (also driving an RX-7) and Clearihan had tangled out on the circuit with a confrontation following in the pits. After Clearihan's exclusion, the 1983 Sports Car Champion Peter Hopwood who was driving in the final round of the 1984 Australian Drivers' Championship at the meeting, was given permission to take his place in the RX-7. Moffat went on to take second place in the 500.

Claerihan won the 2008 Wakefield 300.

== Aircraft ==
Developing an interest in aircraft in 1992, Clearihan switched to flying in search of a new challenge. In 1992 and 1994, he won the Twin Engine Pylon Air Race, coming second in 1993 while still racing cars. In 1998, Clearihan won the Around Australia Air Race and continued to win other twin-engine races.

More recently Clearihan has worked on developing an airstrip in Michelago, New South Wales.

== Career results ==
Season	Series	Position	Car	Team
1982	Australian Sports Car Championship	**1st**	Kaditcha Chevrolet	Chris Clearihan
1982	Formula Ford Driver to Europe Series	10th	Bowin P4	Chris Clearihan
1983	Australian Sports Car Championship	**3rd**	Kaditcha Chevrolet	Canberra Sports Car Club
1984	Australian Sports Car Championship	**2nd**	Kaditcha Chevrolet	Steve Webb
1984	Australian Touring Car Championship	16th	Mazda RX-7	Chris Clearihan
1985	Australian Sports Car Championship	**1st**	Kaditcha Chevrolet	Chris Clearihan
1986	Australian Sports Car Championship	**3rd**	JWS Kaditcha Chevrolet	Chris Clearihan
1986	Australian Endurance Championship	46th	Toyota Corolla; Holden VK Commodore SS Group A	Toyota Team Australia; Fred Geissler
1988	Australian Sports Car Championship	**3rd**	Kaditcha Chevrolet	Chris Clearihan
2004	Aussie Racing Car Super Series	25th	Falcon-Yamaha	Chris Clearihan Racing
2005	Aussie Racing Car Super Series	50th	Falcon-Yamaha	Chris Clearihan Racing
2006	ARMS Thunder Sports Series	**3rd**	Future Racer-Yamaha	
2007	Thunder Sports Series	7th	Future Racer-Yamaha	
2009	Australian Rocket Sports Championship	11th	Future Racer-Yamaha	
2011	Miniature Race Cars Championship	6th	Future Racer-Yamaha	

=== Complete World Touring Car Championship results ===
(key) (Races in bold indicate pole position) (Races in italics indicate fastest lap)

Year	Team	Car	1	2	3	4	5	6	7	8	9	10	11	DC	Points
1987	Peter Williamson Toyota	Toyota Celica Supra	MNZ	JAR	DIJ	NUR	SPA	BNO	SIL	BAT; DNQ	CLD	WEL	FJI	NC	0

=== Complete Indonesian Grand Prix results ===
Year	Car	1	2	Rank	Points
1993	Ralt RT21 Holden	SEN; 8	SEN; 8	9th	6

=== Complete Bathurst 1000 results ===
Year	Team	Co-drivers	Car	Class	Laps	Pos.	Class pos.
1984	Berklee Exhausts	(Australia) David Grose	Mazda RX-7	C	123	27th	21st
1986	Airport Car Rental	(Australia) Fred Geissler	Holden VK Commodore SS Group A	C	156	12th	8th
1987	Peter Williamson Toyota	(Australia) Peter Williamson (Australia) John Sax	Toyota Supra	1	0	DNQ	DNQ
1988	Steve Williams	(Australia) Steve Williams	Holden VK Commodore SS Group A	1	0	DNQ	DNQ

=== Complete Bathurst 12 Hour results ===
Year	Team	Co-drivers	Car	Class	Laps	Pos.	Class pos.
1992	(Australia) MJ Imrie	(Australia) Mike Imrie (Australia) Grant Munday	Saab 900	B	208	35th	7th
1993	(Australia) Peter McLeod	(Australia) Jane Taylor (Australia) Chris Wiles	Citroën BX16	B	74	DNF	DNF
1994	(Australia) Craig Dare	(Australia) Craig Dare	Ford Laser TX3 4WD Turbo	T	25	DNF	DNF
