= 1985 Australian Sports Car Championship =

Seasons
- ← 1984 1986 →

The 1985 Australian Sports Car Championship was a CAMS sanctioned motor racing title for drivers of Group A Sports Cars. It was the 17th Australian Sports Car Championship and the first to be run concurrently with the Australian GT Championship.

1982 Australian Sports Car Champion Chris Clearihan won his second national title, driving a Kaditcha Chevrolet. Only 2.5 points behind Clearihan was Terry Hook in the ex-Guy Edwards owned Chevrolet powered Lola T610 (this car had previously competed at Le Mans in 1982 and 1983), while finishing 3rd in his Mazda powered JWS C2 (an FIA Group C2 sports car) was Jeff Harris.

The 1985 ASCC saw the début of the Veskanda C1 Chevrolet (using a 5.0L Formula 5000 engine) and driven by dual Australian Drivers' Champion John Bowe. Built in Adelaide by K&A Engineering and owned by ASCC driver Bernie Van Elsen, the Veskanda would go on to be regarded as Australia's fastest ever sports car and one of the countries fastest ever race cars. The Veskanda made its race debut in Round 4 at its home circuit, the Adelaide International Raceway where Bowe failed to finish, though he would win Round 5 at Melbourne's Calder Park Raceway, easily defeating the previously dominant Clearihan Kaditcha and Hook Lola. Bowe finished in 7th place in the championship with 25 points.

The 1984 Champion, Queenslander Bap Romano driving his 3.9L Cosworth DFL powered Romano WE84 was expected to bring a strong challenge in defence of his title despite now running in the outright class due to the larger Cosworth V8, but unreliability saw his challenge fade as the series progressed (prior to December 1984 the Romano WE84 had used an ex-Formula One 3.0 L Cosworth DFV V8 engine which put the car in Class B). In the defence of his title, Romano finished in 6th place having only scored 36.5 points.

== Schedule ==
The championship was contested over a six-round series.

Round	Circuit	State	Date	Format	Round winner	Car
1	Lakeside	Queensland	24 March	One race	Chris Clearihan	Kaditcha Chevrolet
2	Oran Park	New South Wales	5 May	Two heats	Chris Clearihan	Kaditcha Chevrolet
3	Winton	Victoria	2 June	Two heats	Terry Hook	Lola T610 Chevrolet
4	Adelaide	South Australia	30 June	One race	Terry Hook	Lola T610 Chevrolet
5	Calder Park	Victoria	11 August	One race	John Bowe	Veskanda C1 Chevrolet
6	Surfers Paradise	Queensland	25 August	One race	Chris Clearihan	Kaditcha Chevrolet

== Classes ==
Cars competed in three engine capacity classes.

- Up to 1.6 litres
- 1.6 to 3 litres
- Over 3 litres

== Points system ==
For single race rounds, championship points were awarded to the top twenty outright placegetters in the Sports Car category, based on the following three tier structure:

Position	1	2	3	4	5	6	7	8	9	10	11	12	13	14	15	16	17	18	19	20
Up to 1.6 litres	30	27	24	21	19	17	15	14	13	12	11	10	9	8	7	6	5	4	3	2
1.6 to 3 litres	28	26	23	20	17	15	14	13	12	11	10	9	8	7	6	5	4	3	2	1
Over 3 litres	25	23	20	17	15	13	11	10	9	8	7	6	5	4	3	2	1	-	-	-

For rounds contested over two heats, the same points system was applied to each heat, with the aggregate points achieved by each driver divided by two to determine the championship points allocation for the round.

== Results ==
Position	Driver	No.	Car	Entrant	Class	R1	R2	R3	R4	R5	R6	Total
1	Chris Clearihan	22	Kaditcha Chevrolet	Chris Clearihan	Over 3 litre	25	25	11.5	23	20	23	127.5
2	Terry Hook	15	Lola T610 Chevrolet	Terry Hook	Over 3 litre	23	10	24	25	23	20	125
3	Jeff Harris	65	JWS C2 Mazda	Jeff Harris	1.6 to 3 litre	17	21.5	14	20	20	20	112.5
4	Ray Hanger	5 & 8	Rennmax Ford BDA	Ray Hanger	1.6 to 3 litre	23	13	23	-	15	-	74

Note: The above table lists only the first four placings in the championship.
