= Romano WE84 =

Romano WE84 Kaditcha K583 The Spirit of Queensland The Spirit of Australia The Bapmobile
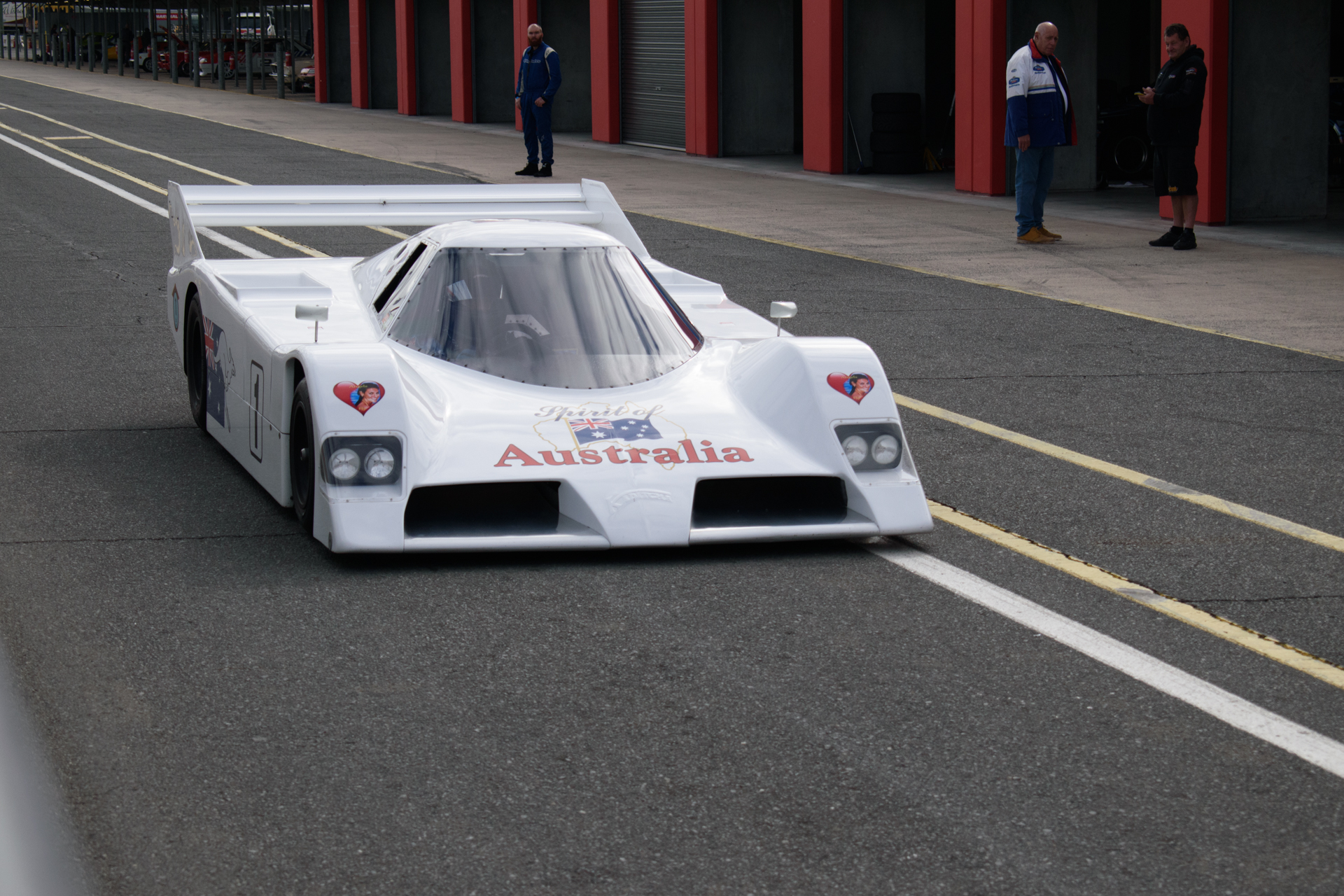
- Romano WE84 in the Queensland Raceway pitlane
- Category: Group A Sports Cars
- Constructor: Kaditcha
- Designers: Barry Lock; Wayne Eckersley

Technical specifications
- Chassis: Aluminum monocoque
- Suspension (front): Double wishbone with pullrod operated inboard coil springs and Koni shock absorbers
- Suspension (rear): Double wishbone with pullrod operated inboard rear springs, Tyrrell uprights and Koni shock absorbers
- Engine: 1983-84: mid-engine, longitudinally mounted, 2,998 cc (182.9 cu in), Cosworth DFV NA V8; 1984-86: mid-engine, longitudinally mounted, 3,955 cc (241.3 cu in), Cosworth DFL NA V8; 2010-: mid-engine, longitudinally mounted, 3,494 cc (213.2 cu in), Cosworth DFZ, NA V8
- Transmission: Hewland FGB 400 5-speed manual
- Weight: 775 kg (1,709 lb) (ASCC); 845 kg (1,863 lb) (FIA WEC)
- Lubricants: Valvoline
- Tyres: Dunlop; Avon

Competition history
- Notable entrants: (Australia) Bap Romano Racing
- Notable drivers: (Australia) Bap Romano (Australia) Alfredo Costanzo
- Debut: 1983 Australian Sports Car Championship Round 1 at Sandown Raceway
Races	Wins	Poles	F/Laps
25	8	10	11
- Constructors' Championships: 0
- Drivers' Championships: 1 (1984)

The Romano WE84 is an Australian designed and built, mid-engined closed top racing car built to CAMS Group A Sports Car specifications. The car began its life as the Kaditcha K583 when it first appeared in the 1983 Australian Sports Car Championship and was built by the Queensland based Kaditcha owner and former McLaren engineer Barry Lock after he was approached by Brisbane accountant, property developer, timber mill owner and former speedway racer Bap Romano in 1981 with the idea of building a Le Mans type coupe. When the car first appeared in 1983 it looked like an FIA Group C Sports Car (such as the Porsche 956) rather than the open cockpit Can-Am style cars of previous years. This led to the false belief that it was built to the Group C regulations

Bap Romano's ultimate ambition was to take the car to the famous 24 Hour French classic in an All-Australian challenge. Although this did not happen, going on the qualifying performance of the car at the 1984 Sandown 1000 race as part of the 1984 World Endurance Championship held at Melbourne's Sandown Raceway against the FIA Group C Sports Cars, the Romano, with some minor modifications to bring it up to FIA specs, would not have been out of place in Group C2 at Le Mans.

== Build ==
Bap Romano travelled to England in December 1981 and purchased a 3.0L Cosworth DFV V8 engine (engine no. DFV 088) from John Nicholson of Nicholson McLaren Engines. The engine itself had actually been used in Formula One during the 1980 season by the McLaren team in the hands of John Watson and a young Alain Prost. While in England Romano was introduced to the Works Manager at Tyrrell Racing, Neil Davis. Davis took an interest in Romano's plans for the car and the two formed a friendship that saw the K583's suspension designed around components of the 1981 Tyrrell 010 Formula One car.

Romano had chosen the Cosworth for its proven reliability in racing against the best alternative at the time, the 5.0L, Chevrolet V8 Formula 5000 engine, which although in 1981 was rated to be more powerful at 520 hp (390 kW), was also a lot heavier at 231.5 kg (510.4 lb) against the DFV's 168 kg (370.4 lb). In addition, running the lower capacity DFV would put the car in the 1.6 to 3 litres Class B in the Australian Sports Car Championship which paid more points per outright placing. When purchased from Nicholson McLaren, the DFV was reportedly producing 406 hp (303 kW) @ 9,450 rpm and was rebuilt to be able to run for 2,000 racing miles. A late 1983 rebuild of the engine at the teams base in Slacks Creek in Brisbane had it producing approximately 430 hp (320 kW)). This compared to the DFV's used in Grand Prix racing that in 1983 were rated at approximately 530 hp (400 kW) and required a rebuild after just 350 miles, or the equivalent of one Grand Prix weekend.

By mid-1982 the car was built with full ground effects aerodynamics and was ready for testing. The car proved quick in testing and the engine was as strong as expected, but the suspension was proving suspect, breaking numerous times under the heavy load generated by the ground effects.

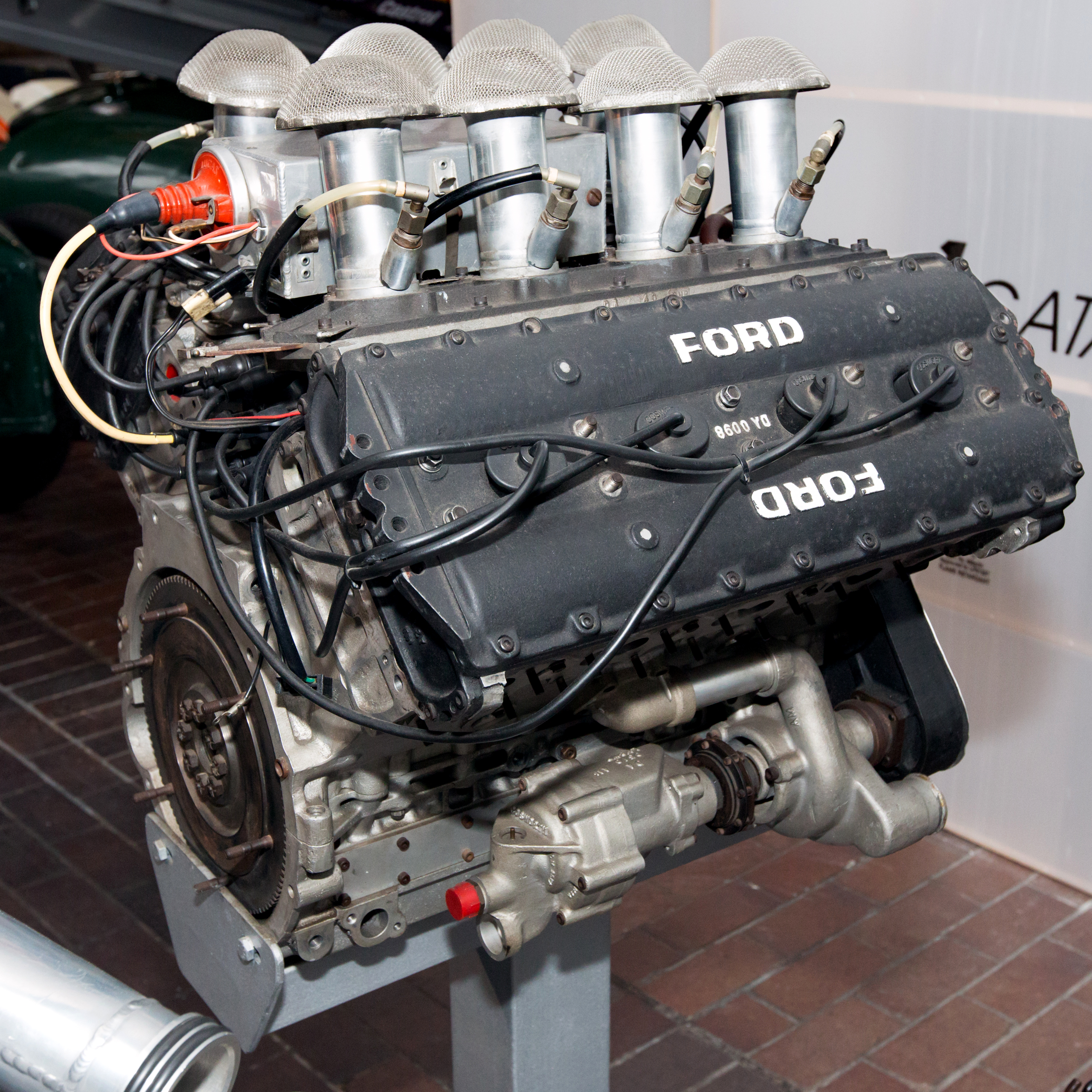
Ford-Cosworth DFV V8 engine

== Racing life ==
=== 1983 ===
By the time the Kaditcha K583 Cosworth made its debut in Round 1 of the 1983 Australian Sports Car Championship at Sandown Raceway in Melbourne, Romano had enlisted the services of former Williams and Tyrrell F1 mechanic Wayne Eckersley to help sort out the car after his faith in Lock had gradually eroded with repeated suspension failures in testing. Romano, driving in Class B (1.6 to 3 litres) suffered a crash in its first lap of practice, forcing the Kaditcha to be a non-starter for both heats on race day. Lock believed the crash was caused by Romano going too fast too soon on cold tyres, while Romano was adamant that suspension failure was the cause.

The car suffered yet another suspension failure during practice and a DNF due to a burnt out coil in Heat 1 of Round 2 of the championship at the Adelaide International Raceway. The burnt out coil was the result of its position on top of the Cosworth engine. The cars had been held on the grid for long time while the back markers took up their positions, and the heat build up was enough to cook the coil only 4 laps into the race when Romano held a 3-second lead over the Kaditcha Chevrolet of Peter Hopwood. On just the 3rd lap, Romano broke Garrie Cooper's Sports Car lap record at AIR of 52.2 (set in his self-designed Elfin MR7 Chevrolet), lowering it to 51.67, a record that still stands for the 1.6 to 3 litres category as of 2025. The coil was replaced in time for Heat 2 where Romano and the car scored their first win, coming home 5.5 seconds in front of eventual series champion Hopwood.

In the 5 rounds and 10 races of the 1983 championship, Romano and the K583 scored 3 race wins and one round win at the tight Winton circuit. He also recorded 6 fastest laps (including 3 class lap records) and 2 pole positions. Romano actually won both heats of Round 4 at his home circuit of Lakeside in Brisbane, but both he and Hopwood were excluded from the results for dangerous driving following two clashes in heat 1.

Despite only finishing 6th in the championship, Bap Romano proved that he had the fastest Sports Car seen in Australia to that time.

In November, Romano entered the K583 in the Sports Car/GT Invitation as a support to the 1983 Australian Grand Prix at the 1.609 km (1.000 mi) Calder Park Raceway in Melbourne. Romano qualified the car second on the grid beside Australia's 1980 Formula One World Champion Alan Jones who was driving a Porsche 935 K4 GT car imported from America for the race by John Fitzpatrick Racing. Jones won the first 15 lap preliminary race from Peter Brock driving Bob Jane's Chevrolet Monza with Romano back in third place in front of the Porsche 935/78 of Momo Wheels founder, Italian Gianpiero Moretti. Jones also won the main 15 lap race from Romano and Peter Brock with Moretti again finishing fourth. Despite the Kaditcha-Cosworth giving away over 400 hp (300 kW) to the turbocharged Porsche and about 170 hp (130 kW) to the 6.0L V8 Chevrolet Monza, Romano used the superior handling and aerodynamics of the car to finish the 15 lap race only 6.79 seconds behind Jones and 3.22 seconds clear of Brock showing that both car and driver had the potential to be a regular race winner.

=== 1984 ===
In the almost 6 months between the Australian Grand Prix meeting at Calder in mid-November 1983 and the start of the 1984 Australian Sports Car Championship in late April, Wayne Eckersley rebuilt the inner workings of the car, redesigning the sidepods to work without the skirts which resulted in improved ground effect aerodynamics. With Eckersley's new skirt-less design, the car was found to produce as much downforce as it had previously with the skirts. He also rebuilt the suspension of the car after it was found that the Tyrrell suspension designed for a 581 kg (1,281 lb) Formula One car was actually inadequate for a sports car that weighed 194 kg (428 lb) more and produced similar loading from the ground effect aerodynamics. It was deduced it was this suspension issue that had caused the numerous failures through testing in 1982 and racing in 1983. Eckersley also re-profiled the front of the car, retaining its distinctive twin front air scoops but enlarging both to allow more air to both the ground effect venturies and to the brakes.

During this time, the Cosworth DFV's original builder at Nicholson McLaren, Ross Calgher who had since retired home to New Zealand, had flown over to the teams base in Brisbane at the request of his former employer and rebuilt the engine in late 1983, upping the power from 406 hp (303 kW) to around 430 hp (320 kW).

Under Eckersley's direction the car was transformed and Romano went on to dominate the championship. The car was renamed the Romano WE84 (WE for Wayne Eckersley) and Bap Romano won 4 of the 5 rounds, sat on pole for every round and set fastest race lap in every race he contested. The only round he did not win was the crash marred Round 1 at Calder where he was involved in a crash, running into the back of Ray Hanger's Rennmax while lapping him at the end of Calder's back straight during Heat 1 which destroyed the front of the car causing Romano to be a non-starter in Heat 2. Bap watched part of Heat 2 from the Channel 7 commentary box, giving television commentary alongside Evan Green, Garry Wilkinson and John Sheppard for a few minutes.

Despite running in Class B which paid more points for a position than his main opposition Chris Clearihan (driving Hopwood's 1983 car) did for a position in Class C, the way the results of the series fell with Clearihan failing to finish Round 3 at Lakeside due to suspension failure, Romano would have still won the 1984 ASCC had they been competing for the same class points.

=== 1984 Challenge to Peter Brock ===
In mid-1984 Bap Romano, feeling that he had the fastest sports car in Australia (and having proved so in the 1984 ASCC), challenged then seven time Bathurst 1000 winner Peter Brock, with Brock to drive the 620 hp (460 kW) Porsche 956 that he was to share with Larry Perkins at the 1984 24 Hours of Le Mans, to a series of races on circuits in Australia fair to both cars claiming the WE84 could beat Brock's 956. At the time Brock's Melbourne based Holden Dealer Team had taken delivery of the Porsche for repainting in the colours of team patron Bob Jane for publicity purposes and so the team could become familiar with the car after 10 years of running production based Holden V8 touring cars. Romano claimed in a Brisbane newspaper that it was 'ridiculous' for Brock to pretend that his 1984 Le Mans challenge was an 'All-Australian' effort since the Porsche was made in West Germany. However it was noted that Romano ignored the fact that his car had sourced many of its components, including the suspension and Cosworth V8 engine, from England, though the Romano WE84 was designed and built in Australia.

Romano's open challenge to Brock went unanswered.

=== 1984 Sandown 1000 ===
Following the successful 1984 championship, Eckersley and Romano prepared the car for the Sandown 1000 which was a round of the 1984 World Endurance Championship where it would compete in the special AC Class for Australian-based GT and Sports cars. The preparation included adding 70 kg (154.3 lb) of ballast to the 775 kg (1,708.6 lb) WE84 to bring it in line with the FIA weight scale for cars with a 3.9 litre, four valves per cylinder engine (the lead weight, bringing the car to 845 kg (1,862.9 lb), was placed on the passenger floor which would bring its own problems). Despite Romano purchasing a 3.9 litre Cosworth DFL V8 with the intent on putting it in before the meeting, it was only put in after the first day of practice when it became apparent the 3.0 litre DFV was past its best after Romano's co-driver, four times Australian Drivers' Champion Alfredo Costanzo (the faster of the pair by over 2 seconds despite not having driven the car previously after missing a pre-meeting sorting session at Calder Park) could not lap in better than 1:42 when Romano had expected that his car was capable of lapping around 6–8 seconds faster.

After changing to the larger and more powerful (530 hp (400 kW)) engine during practice, Romano and Costanzo were able to improve their times by around 4 seconds per lap. Following numerous gearbox and brake problems throughout practice, as well as battling a severe under-steer problem on Sandown's new, slower, infield section (a legacy of the extra weight the car was carrying at the front, something even the ground effect aerodynamics could not overcome), Costanzo eventually qualified the car in 13th position (1st in AC) with a time of 1:38.400, some 1.9 seconds in front of Allan Grice driving his 1984 Australian GT Championship winning 6.0L Chevrolet Monza, but 6.8 seconds slower than the pole time set by eventual race winner and 1984 World Endurance Champion Stefan Bellof driving his Group C Rothmans Porsche 956B. Costanzo's time was only 0.4 seconds off the Group C2 pole time set by Englishman Gordon Spice (driving with English-based Aussie Neil Crang) in a Tiga GC84, powered by the 3.3 litre version of the same Cosworth DFL that powered the WE84. Despite the cars problems, Costanzo's time showed that the Australian designed and built car was capable of mixing it with the best Sports Cars in the world.

More gearbox and brake problems during the race, along with a collision with the Rothmans Porsche 956B of British Formula 3 champion Johnny Dumfries which broke the nose cone from the car (later retrieved by the team and put back on with race tape) saw Romano and Costanzo only complete 106 laps, 100 behind winners Bellof and Derek Bell (Dumfries shared his drive with Australia's triple Formula One World Champion Sir Jack Brabham, marking his first (and only) World Championship race since his retirement from F1 at the end of 1970). Despite still running at the end, the Romano WE84 was not classified as a finisher due to completing an insufficient number of laps. Victory in the AC Class went to the BMW 320i of JPS Team BMW drivers Jim Richards and Tony Longhurst who finished 14th after completing 178 laps.

Prior to Sandown, Romano wanted Costanzo as his co-driver for the race, but both Wayne Eckersley and team manager Bruce Ayers tried to persuade him to go with either the 1984 Australian Drivers' Champion John Bowe (who had comprehensively beaten Costanzo to that years title and would later race the Veskanda Chevrolet to great effect) or 1983 Sports Car champion Peter Hopwood for the event, reasoning that both would be easier on the car than Costanzo who although fast, had a reputation for being hard on equipment. Unfortunately their fears were to prove correct as over the course of the race meeting Costanzo broke no less than 4 gearboxes, 2 of them in the race itself. JPS Team BMW team manager Frank Gardner (who had actually been Costanzo's team boss when he had co-driven with Allan Grice in the 1979 Hardie-Ferodo 1000 at Bathurst), told Romano after the race that during practice while standing at the back straight entry to Sandown's new infield section, he noted that Costanzo had been changing from 5th gear straight down to 2nd gear for the hairpin, missing 4th and 3rd gears completely. This was causing the rear tyres to lock up, the Cosworth engine to over-rev and had seen the Hewland FGB 400 gearbox twice stripped of 2nd gear. Gardner, a championship winning driver in his own right during the 1960s and 1970s including having raced a number of WEC races in Europe at tracks such as Le Mans, Spa-Francorchamps and the Nürburgring, commented that it was an endurance race and that Alfie had 'butchered' the car by not respecting the equipment.

Bap Romano's previous challenge had gone unanswered by Peter Brock. However, the 956 that Brock and co-driver Larry Perkins were to drive at the Sandown 1000 was upgraded to the new 962 model and was driven by the versatile Colin Bond and open wheel racer Andrew Miedecke after Brock and Perkins became unavailable. In a car neither had driven before, and with approximately 250 hp (190 kW) more horsepower than either was used to, Bond qualified the 962 in 11th place with a time of 1:36.000, 2.4 seconds faster than Costanzo qualified the Romano, while Bap Romano was able to set a time in the high 1:39's. Bond and Miedecke ran a steady race and finished 6th, 8 laps behind the winning Rothmans Porsche.

=== 1985 - 1986 ===
Due to reliability problems with the car, mostly diff related with the original not coping with the extra 100 hp (75 kW) of the larger engine which also caused handling problems, plus losing chief mechanic Wayne Eckersley who had re-located from Brisbane to Sydney to help the Mark Petch Motorsport team with their Volvo 240T Group A touring car, Romano only contested 3 rounds of the 1985 Australian Sports Car Championship. That plus the appearance of other specially built cars such as a 5.0L ex-Le Mans raced Lola T610-Chevrolet for Terry Hook (2nd), and the 300 hp (220 kW) Mazda 13B powered JWS C2 of Jeff Harris (3rd in 1984 & 1985), saw Romano only finish 6th in his title defence. The series was won by 1982 champion Chris Clearihan driving the Steve Webb owned Kaditcha Chev he had driven to the runner up spot in 1984.

Romano only contested two rounds of the 1986 Australian Sports Car Championship, while also contesting the 1986 Australian Drivers' Championship in a Ralt RT4 (Romano only drove the open wheeler after being informed by FISA that had to drive the Formula Mondial car in order to get enough signatures for the required Super Licence needed in order to fulfill the plan to drive a Formula One Tyrrell in the 1986 Australian Grand Prix in Adelaide). The 1985 Sports Car title had seen the debut of the John Bowe driven Veskanda Chevrolet built by former ASCC competitor Brenie Van Elsen (while the Romano was built specifically as a CAMS Group A Sports Car, the Veskanda also complied with the international Group C and American IMSA regulations). Bowe and the Veskanda, now complete with a 5.7 litre Chevrolet due to a lifting of the engine capacity limit from 5000 to 6000cc, dominated the 1986 series, claiming pole at every round (like the Romano in 1984), winning every race and setting fastest laps in all (including many outright circuit lap records).

On 25 May 1986, The WE84 suffered a bad crash in a minor Sports and GT Handicap race at Amaroo Park in Sydney when the throttle stuck open as the car drove over Bitupave Hill at the end of the main straight, the fastest section of the tight 1.9 km circuit where the faster cars reached over 220 km/h (137 mph). Going into the left hander before the right hand Dunlop Loop after the hill, Romano couldn't slow the car and it drove straight through the infield. The car hit a dip and bounced across the track at speed, hitting an earth bank (that had old tyres dug into it which thankfully cushioned some of the impact). However, despite the tyres, not only did the impact destroy the front of the WE84 but it also resulted in two badly broken legs for Romano. Emergency crew's took over an hour to remove Romano from his car where, despite his injuries, a conscious Romano (with help from Chris Clearihan who had stopped his own car to help) was able to inform the rescuers where to cut the front of the car so that it wouldn't collapse on top of him.

In an interview with Neil Crompton for the Amaroo Park meetings television broadcaster Channel 7 that was aired before the race in which he crashed, Bap claimed that his car was the "Fastest Group C2 car in the world", going on to say that he would prove it at the proposed WEC race at Surfers Paradise later in the year. Unfortunately the crash ended Bap's plans for the car while the proposed race never actually went ahead.

After three and a bit seasons of sports car racing in Australia, Romano retired the car following the crash, and once recovered from his injuries (by 1988), he returned to racing in the Australian Drivers' Championship.

== Rebuild ==
Bap Romano retained the car and commissioned the cars original builder Barry Lock to build a replacement chassis to replace the one written off in the 1986 Amaroo crash. This was done by 2001 and by 2010 the WE84 had been completely rebuilt and track tested at Queensland Raceway by Romano himself. Currently Bap Romano drives the car in historic events including returning to Lakeside Park in Brisbane 26 years after it last competed there, at the Festival of Sports Cars on 22–24 July. The car now runs a 590 hp (440 kW), 3.5L Cosworth DFZ V8 engine developed for Formula One that Romano had intended to put the car after 1986, but didn't due to the rebuild needed after his Amaroo Park crash, and his move into open wheelers in pursuit of the Australian Drivers' Championship.

In 2025, Bab Romano and his car took part in the Adelaide Motorsport Festival.

== Race wins ==
=== Overall ===
- Australian Sports Car Championship - 1983 (x3), 1984 (x4)

=== Series wins ===
- Australian Sports Car Championship - 1984
