= 1986 Australian Drivers' Championship =

Motor racing competition

Seasons
- ← 1985 1987 →

The 1986 Australian Drivers' Championship was a CAMS sanctioned Australian motor racing title for Formula Mondial racing cars. It was the 30th Australian Drivers' Championship. The championship winner was awarded the 1986 CAMS Gold Star.

Australian Ralt importer Graham Watson won the title, his only Australian Drivers' Championship, with former Australian Sports Car Champions Peter Hopwood (1983) and Bap Romano (1984) placing second and third respectively, each driving Ralt RT4s. The only driver to score championship points in any car other than a Ralt RT4 was Peter Macrow, who drove a Cheetah Mk8 to equal thirteenth place in the championship.

Defending and two-time champion John Bowe did not contest the 1986 championship. Instead he drove a Volvo 240T in the Australian Touring Car Championship and also drove the Veskanda-Chevrolet to win the Australian Sports Car Championship. He did however have one last race in the Chris Leach Racing Ralt RT4-Ford when he won the Formula Mondial support race at the Australian Grand Prix meeting in Adelaide in October.

== Calendar ==
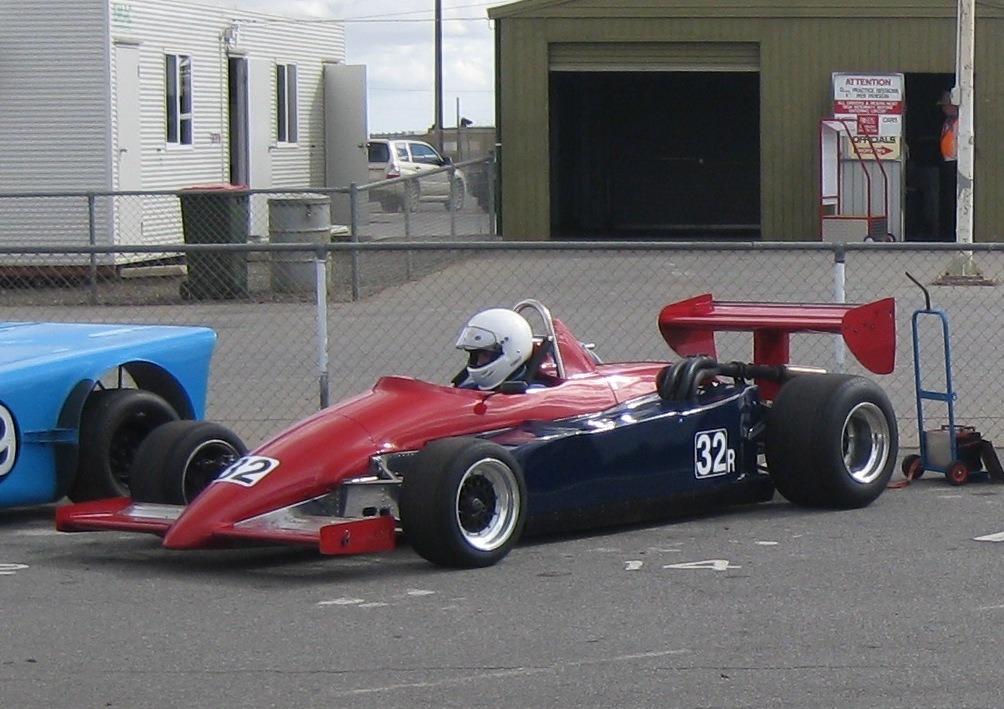
Graham Watson won the championship driving a Ralt RT4, similar to the example pictured above

The championship was contested over a seven-round series.

| Round | Race | Circuit | City / state | Date | Format | Winner | Car | Team |
|---|---|---|---|---|---|---|---|---|
| 1 | Victoria Trophy | Sandown International Motor Racing Circuit | Melbourne, Victoria | 13 April | One race | Graham Watson | Ralt RT4 Ford | Ralt Australia |
| 2 | CSA Alloy Wheels Cup | Adelaide International Raceway | Adelaide, South Australia | 27 April | One race | Peter Hopwood | Ralt RT4 Ford | Menage Racing Team |
| 3 | | Wanneroo Park Raceway | Perth, Western Australia | 4 May | Two races | Bap Romano | Ralt RT4 Ford | Watson Motor Racing Pty Ltd |
| 4 | | Calder Park Raceway | Melbourne, Victoria | 1 June | One race | Ken Smith | Ralt RT4 Ford | Watson Motor Racing Pty Ltd |
| 5 | | Winton Motor Raceway | Benalla, Victoria | 29 June | Two races | Ken Smith | Ralt RT4 Ford | Ralt Australia |
| 6 | | Oran Park Raceway | Sydney, New South Wales | 13 July | Two races | Peter Hopwood | Ralt RT4 Ford | Menage Racing Team |
| 7 | Altos Computers Trophy | Amaroo Park | Sydney, New South Wales | 3 August | One race | Terry Ryan | Ralt RT4 Ford | Terry Ryan Automotive |

== Points system ==
Championship points were awarded on a 9–6–4–3–2–1 basis to the top six placegetters in each round. Each driver could count points only from his or her six best round performances.

== Results ==
| Position | Driver | No. | Car | Entrant | San | Ade | Wan | Cal | Win | Ora | Ama | Total |
|---|---|---|---|---|---|---|---|---|---|---|---|---|
| 1 | Graham Watson | 9 | Ralt RT4 Ford | Ralt Australia; Watson Motor Racing Pty Ltd | 9 | 4 | 4 | 6 | 6 | 4 | – | 33 |
| 2 | Peter Hopwood | 22 | Ralt RT4 Ford | Menage Racing Team | – | 9 | 1 | 4 | 4 | 9 | – | 27 |
| 3 | Bap Romano | 8 | Ralt RT4 Ford | Ralt Australia; Watson Motor Racing Pty Ltd | 6 | 6 | 9 | – | – | – | – | 21 |
| 4 | Ken Smith | 8 | Ralt RT4 Ford | Watson Motor Racing Pty Ltd; Ralt Australia | – | – | – | 9 | 9 | – | – | 18 |
| 5 | Terry Ryan | 36 | Ralt RT4 Ford | Terry Ryan Automotive | – | – | – | – | – | 6 | 9 | 15 |
| 6 | Peter Larner | 83 | Ralt RT4 Ford | Peter Larner | 2 | 3 | – | – | – | – | 4 | 9 |
| 6 | Chris Hocking | 74 | Ralt RT4 Ford | Chris Hocking | 3 | – | – | – | – | – | 6 | 9 |
| 6 | Peter Boylan | 7 | Ralt RT4 Ford | Peter Michael Boylan | 4 | – | – | – | 2 | – | 3 | 9 |
| 9 | Brian Sampson | 78 | Ralt RT4 Ford | Brian Sampson | – | 2 | – | 3 | 3 | – | – | 8 |
| 10 | Bob Creasy | 16 | Ralt RT4 Ford | | – | – | 6 | – | – | – | – | 6 |
| 11 | Gordon Dobie | 54 | Ralt RT4 Ford | Gordon Dobie | – | – | 2 | 2 | – | – | – | 4 |
| 11 | George Parkinson | 17 | Ralt RT4 Ford | George Parkinson | – | – | – | 1 | – | 1 | 2 | 4 |
| 13 | Keith McClelland | | Ralt RT4 Ford | Watson Motor Racing | – | – | – | – | – | 3 | – | 3 |
| 13 | Geoff Nichol | 40 | Ralt RT4 Ford | | – | – | 3 | – | – | – | – | 3 |
| 13 | Peter Macrow | | Cheetah Mk8 Ford | Peter Macrow | – | – | – | – | 1 | 2 | – | 3 |
| 16 | John Beasley | 2 | Ralt RT4 Ford | John Beasley | – | 1 | – | – | – | – | – | 1 |
| 16 | Richard Davison | 6 | Ralt RT4 Ford | Richard Davison Racing | 1 | – | – | – | – | – | – | 1 |

Note: There were only five finishers in Round 7 at Amaroo Park.
