= 1984 Australian Sports Car Championship =

Motor racing competition

Seasons
- ← 1983 1985 →

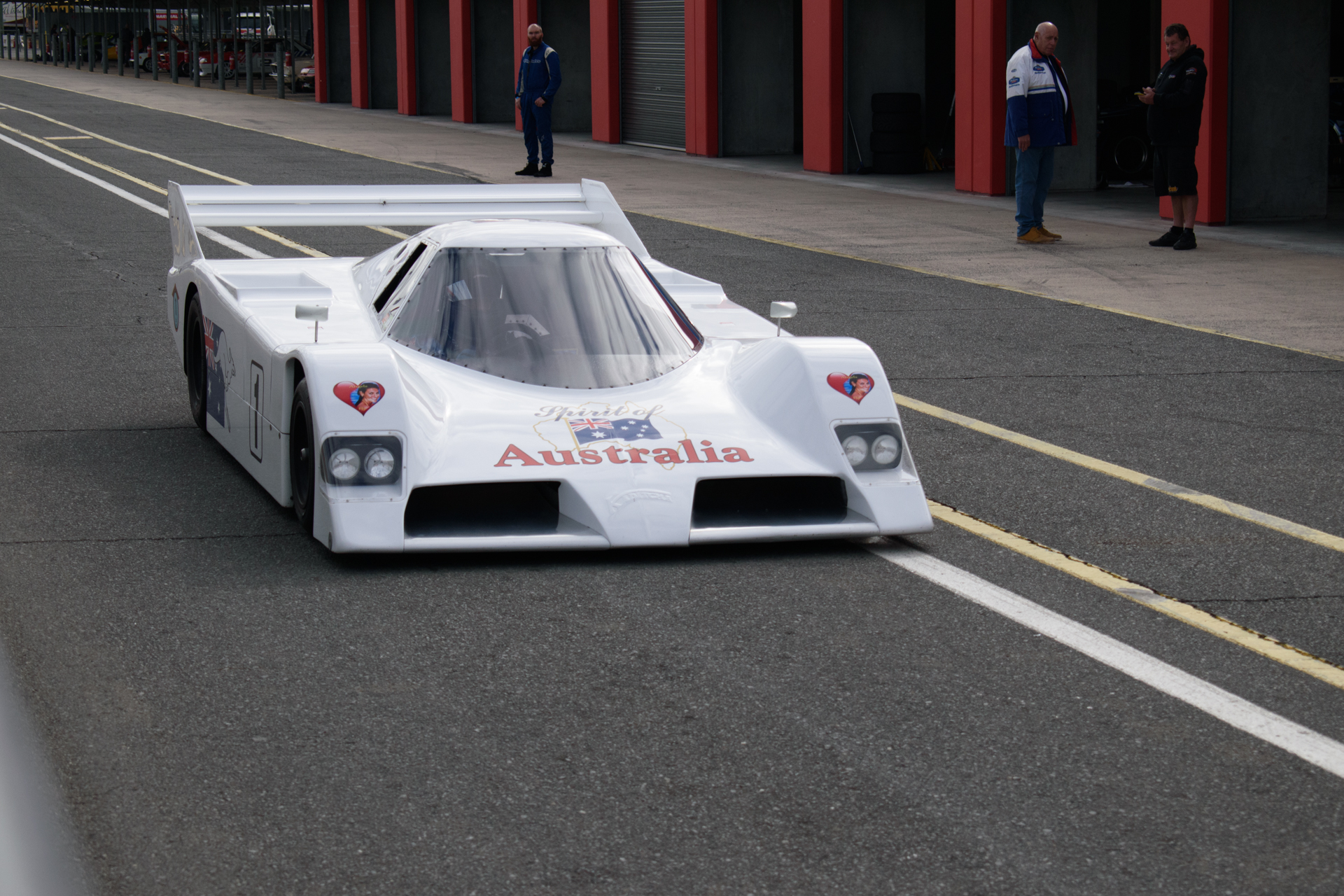
The Romano WE84 with which Bap Romano won the championship. The car is pictured in 2025.

The 1984 Australian Sports Car Championship was an Australian motor racing title open to Sports Cars complying with CAMS Group A regulations. It was the 16th Australian Sports Car Championship.

Queensland based owner/driver Bap Romano won the championship driving his Romano WE84 Cosworth. 1982 champion Chris Clearihan, (driving the Kaditcha-Chevrolet that Peter Hopwood used to win the 1983 Championship), placed second and Andrew Roberts, driving a self designed Roberts S2 Ford, placed third.

Romano dominated the championship, continuing on from his victory in the final round of the 1983 Championship at Winton. With engineering help from former Williams and Tyrrell Formula One mechanic Wayne Eckersley transforming the Barry Lock built car, Romano put the renamed Romano WE84 (formerly called a Kaditcha K583) on pole position at every round and scored fastest lap in each race which he contested. He was overall winner in each round bar Round 1 at Calder Raceway where he crashed heavily in Heat 1, and was a non-starter in Heat 2. Clearihan scored fastest lap in Heat 2 and was the overall winner of that round.

The expected challenge from Alan Newton in his Elfin MS7-Repco Holden (the same car that Elfin Sports Cars founder Garrie Cooper had used to win the 1975 Championship) came to a premature end during the first lap of the second heat at the opening round at Calder. Sitting in second behind Clearihan going down Calder's back straight, the car's throttle jammed open going into the braking area and Newton veered left, running at high speed across the infield until hitting a small rise which saw the Elfin literally fly across the track (it was airborne for approximately 20 metres) before landing and hitting the guardrail at undiminished speed. Newton survived the crash with nothing more than a busted knee and broken ankle (later during the race Newton was shown by race broadcaster Channel 7 sitting up and talking to medical staff as he was being placed into an ambulance). Although the Elfin suffered heavy damage in the crash, it was later repaired though it took no further part in the championship. Another possible challenger, Terry Hook and his 5.0 litre, ex-Guy Edwards Lola T610 Chevrolet did not contest any races in the championship. Hook's Lola first appeared at Surfers Paradise for Round 2 but Hook became concerned about the car's front end lifting at high speed and the car was not raced. After appearing in practice for the Lakeside round, the car would not appear again until the 1985 Championship.

Romano could have benefited from the fact that his car's 3.0 litre Cosworth DFV engine (purchased from John Nicholson of Nicholson McLaren Engines) allowed him to run in Class B (1.6 to 3 litres) which meant he scored more points for a win or place than his main challenger Clearihan did driving in Class C (Over 3 litres), i.e. a win for Romano meant 28 points while a win for Clearihan scored only 25. As it was, by actually winning 4 of the 5 rounds, and with Clearihan scoring a DNF in Round 3 at Lakeside with damaged suspension, Romano would have still won the championship 100-94 had they both been driving for Class C points.

== Schedule ==
The championship was contested over a five-round series:

Round	Circuit	State	Date	Format	Race winners	Round winner	Car
1	Calder Park	Victoria	29 April	Two heats	Chris Clearihan; Chris Clearihan	Chris Clearihan	Kaditcha Chevrolet
2	Surfers Paradise	Queensland	13 May	One race	Bap Romano	Bap Romano	Romano WE84 Cosworth
3	Lakeside	Queensland	22 July	One race	Bap Romano	Bap Romano	Romano WE84 Cosworth
4	Oran Park	New South Wales	19 August	One race	Bap Romano	Bap Romano	Romano WE84 Cosworth
5	Winton	Victoria	14 October	One race	Bap Romano	Bap Romano	Romano WE84 Cosworth

Round 1 of the championship was originally to be run at Melbourne's Sandown Park. However, due to the circuit's closure while it was rebuilt and lengthened in time for the 1984 Sandown 1000 World Endurance Championship round, the meeting was cancelled. Former racer and millionaire tyre retailer Bob Jane then restored the championship to five rounds by hosting Round 1 at his Calder Park Raceway. Round 4 at Sydney's Oran Park was also cancelled, but was later restored after the circuit owners had a vacant spot to fill in the schedule of support races for the Valvoline 250 Australian Endurance Championship race for Touring Cars. The Oran Park round was contested on the circuits shorter, 1.960 km (1.218 mi) 'South Circuit' rather than the full 2.620 km (1.62 mi) Grand Prix circuit.

== Classes ==
Cars competed in three classes according to engine capacity:

- Class A : Up to 1.6 litres
- Class B : 1.6 to 3 litres
- Class C : Over 3 litres

== Points system ==
Championship points were awarded as shown in the table below. For Round 1 only, points were awarded for each race with the aggregate achieved by each driver divided by two. The result was the driver's championship points allocation for that round.

Outright Position	Class A	Class B	Class C
1	30	28	25
2	27	26	23
3	24	23	20
4	21	20	17
5	19	17	15
6	17	15	13
7	15	14	11
8	14	13	10
9	13	12	9
10	12	11	8
11	11	10	7
12	10	9	6
13	9	8	5
14	8	7	4
15	7	6	3
16	6	5	2
17	5	4	1
18	4	3	0
19	3	2	0
20	2	1	0

== Championship standings ==
Position	Driver	No.	Car	Entrant	Class	Rd1 Calder Park	Rd2 Surfers Paradise	Rd3 Lakeside	Rd4 Oran Park	Rd5 Winton	Total
1	Bap Romano	8	Romano WE84 Cosworth	Bap Romano Racing	B	-	28	28	28	28	112
2	Chris Clearihan	22	Kaditcha Chevrolet	Chris Clearihan	C	25	23	-	23	23	94
3	Andrew Roberts	14	Roberts S2 Ford	Andrew Roberts	A	21.5	21	13	21	-	76.5
4	Jeff Harris	49 & 6	Kaditcha SR781 Mazda	Jeff Harris	B	-	23	-	23	23	69
5	Michael Hart		Mawer Ford	Robert Hart & Sons Pty Ltd	A	17	15	15	-	-	47
6	John Campbell		Auscam Clubman Toyota		A	-	17	27	-	-	44
7	Peter Tighe		Mallock U2T Mk20T		A	-	19	24	-	-	43
8	Leigh Vine	9 & 11	Kaditcha Chevrolet; Elfin 360 Mazda	Chris Clearihan; Leigh Vine	C B	-	-	13	-	20	33
9	Geoff Watson		Watson Toyota	Geoff Watson	A	8.5	-	-	19	-	27.5
10	Joe Vorst	11	Kaditcha Chevrolet	Joe Vorst	C	21.5	-	-	-	-	21.5
11	Kevin Johnston		WAH 002 Datsun		A	-	-	21	-	-	21
12	John Kierath		Cheetah Clubman		A	-	-	19	-	-	19
12	Colin Memery		Allison Clubman		A	-	-	-	-	19	19
14	Malcolm McLean		Nota		A	-	-	-	17	-	17
14	Greg Gardiner		Bulant Clubman		A	-	-	-	-	17	17
16	Wally Gates		Bulant		A	-	-	-	15	-	15
16	Peter Heraud		Farrell Clubman		A	-	-	-	-	15	15
18	Robert Fenwick		Scorpio		B	14	-	-	-	-	14
18	John Barram		ASP Clubman		A	-	14	-	-	-	14
18	Peter Ferguson		Nambull Clubman		A	-	-	-	-	14	14
21	Ken Peters		Auscam 600M Mazda		B	-	-	13	-	-	13
21	John Butcher		Milano	Barry Ekins	B	-	-	-	13	-	13
21	Brian Rawlings		Bulant		A	-	-	-	13	-	13
24	Peter Irwin		Triumph TR5		B	-	12	-	-	-	12
24	John Dooley		Bulant Mk7		A	-	12	-	-	-	12
26	Alan Newton	5	Elfin MS7 Repco Holden	Alan Newton	C	11.5	-	-	-	-	11.5
27	Peter Kyriakidis		Farrell F483	Albert Middleton	A	10.5	-	-	-	-	10.5
28	Bernie Van Elsen		Bolwell Nagari	Bernard Van Elsen	C	8.5	-	-	-	-	8.5
