= 1984 Australian Drivers' Championship =

Motor racing competition

Seasons
- ← 1983 1985 →

The 1984 Australian Drivers' Championship was a CAMS sanctioned national motor racing title open to drivers of racing cars complying with Formula Mondial regulations.

The winner of the title, which was the 28th Australian Drivers' Championship, was awarded the 1984 CAMS Gold Star. John Bowe won the championship driving a Ralt RT4 Ford. It would be the first of two such titles for the Tasmanian driver. Finishing second in the championship was four-time defending champion Alfredo Costanzo in his Porsche Cars Australia team Tiga FA81 Ford, while the 1983 Australian Sports Car Champion Peter Hopwood driving his Ralt RT4 Ford finished in third place in his first full season of open wheel racing.

After finishing 4th and being the first resident Australian driver home in the non-championship 1984 Australian Grand Prix at Melbourne's Calder Park Raceway in November, Alfie Costanzo effectively retired from open wheel racing when his Porsche Cars Australia team boss Alan Hamilton closed the race team.

== Calendar ==
The championship was contested over a seven-round series with each round held as a single race. Winton Raceway was originally intended to host the final round of the series on 14 October but that meeting was cancelled. Negotiations between track secretary Michael Ronke and CAMS saw the round re-instated to 2 months earlier than planned (12 August) becoming Round 4 instead of Round 7. This rescheduling ultimately cost Alfredo Costanzo any chance he had of successfully retaining his championship as he had booked business with Porsche in West Germany for the weekend of the rescheduled race. John Smith would take his place in the Tiga FA/83 for the race.

Round	Circuit	Event	City / state	Date	Winner	Car	Team
Rd 1	Adelaide International Raceway	Porsche Cars Australia Trophy	Adelaide, South Australia	1 July	Alfredo Costanzo	Tiga FA81 Ford	Porsche Cars Australia
Rd 2	Lakeside International Raceway		Brisbane, Queensland	22 July	John Bowe	Ralt RT4/84 Ford	Chris Leach Racing
Rd 3	Calder Park Raceway		Melbourne	29 July	Alfredo Costanzo	Tiga FA81 Ford	Porsche Cars Australia
Rd 4	Winton Raceway		Benalla, Victoria	12 August	John Bowe	Ralt RT4/84 Ford	Chris Leach Racing
Rd 5	Oran Park Raceway		Sydney	19 August	John Bowe	Ralt RT4/84 Ford	Chris Leach Racing
Rd 6	Wanneroo Park Raceway		Perth, Western Australia	26 August	John Bowe	Ralt RT4/84 Ford	Chris Leach Racing
Rd 7	Sandown International Raceway	EON FM Cup	Melbourne	9 September	John Bowe	Ralt RT4/84 Ford	Chris Leach Racing

== Points system ==
Championship points were awarded on a 9–6–4–3–2–1 basis to the top six classified finishers at each round.

== Results ==
Position	Driver	No.	Car	Entrant	Rd1	Rd2	Rd3	Rd4	Rd5	Rd6	Rd7	Total
1	John Bowe	4	Ralt RT4 Ford	Chris Leach Racing	6	9	1	9	9	9	9	52
2	Alfredo Costanzo	1	Tiga FA81 Ford	Porsche Cars Australia	9	–	9	–	6	6	3	33
3	Peter Hopwood	22	Ralt RT4 Ford	Menage Racing	3	4	6	1	2	3	4	23
4	Bruce Connolly	51	Ralt RT4 Ford	Bruce Connolly	4	6	4	–	3	–	2	19
5	Lucio Cesario	30	Tiga FA83 Ford; Ralt RT4 Ford	Porsche Cars Australia	1	–	2	6	–	–	6	15
6	Graham Watson	8 & 9	Ralt RT4 Ford	Ralt Australia	–	1	3	3	1	4	1	13
7	Peter Macrow	25	Cheetah Mk 8 Ford	Repco Engine Parts	2	–	–	2	–	2	–	6
8	John Smith*	1	Tiga FA83 Ford	Porsche Cars Australia	–	–	–	4	–	–	–	4
8	Ian Bland		Kaditcha Ford		–	–	–	–	4	–	–	4
10	Peter Phillips		Ralt RT4 Ford		–	3	–	–	–	–	–	3
11	Peter Bull		Elfin 622 Ford		–	2	–	–	–	–	–	2
12	Bob Creasy	6	Ralt RT4 Ford		–	–	–	–	–	1	–	1

_{*John Smith subbed for Costanzo at Round 4 due to Costanzo being in Germany}
