= 1981 Australian Sports Car Championship =

Seasons
- ← 1980 1982 →

The 1981 Australian Sports Car Championship was a CAMS sanctioned Australian motor racing title open to Group D Production Sports Cars. It was the thirteenth Australian Sports Car Championship and the last to be restricted to cars complying with Group D regulations. The championship was won by John Latham, driving a Porsche Turbo.

== Schedule ==
The championship was contested over a four-round series with Rounds 1, 2 and 3 each staged over two heats and Round 4 run as a single race.

Round	Circuit	Location / state	Date	Heat 1 winner	Heat 2 winner	Round winner
1	Sandown Park	Melbourne, Vic.	22 February	John Latham	John Walker	John Latham
2	Baskerville Raceway	Hobart, Tas.	5 April	John Walker	John Latham	John Latham
3	Winton Motor Raceway	Winton, Vic.	23 August	Murray Bryden	John Latham	John Latham
4	Calder Park Raceway	Melbourne, Vic.	8 October	John Latham	N/A	John Latham

== Class structure ==
Cars competed in two engine capacity classes:

- Class A - Over 2000cc
- Class B - Up to and including 2000cc

== Points system ==
Championship points were awarded on a 9-6-4-3-2-1 basis for the first six placings in each class at each round. Bonus points were awarded on a 4-3-2-1 basis for the top four placings irrespective of class at each round.

Where rounds were run in multiple parts, drivers were allocated points on a 20-16-13-11-10-9-8-7-6-5-4-3-2-1 basis for the first fourteen positions in each part. These points were then aggregated to determine the placings for that round.

== Championship standings ==
Position	Driver	Car	Entrant	Class	San	Bas	Win	Cal	Total
1	John Latham	Porsche Turbo	John Latham	A	13	13	13	13	52
2	Murray Bryden	Lotus Super 7	Murray Bryden	B	9	10	4	-	23
3	Peter Fitzgerald	Porsche Carrera	Lindsay Quinn Real Estate	A	1	6	4	9	20
4	John Walker	Porsche Turbo	Magnum Wheels	A	9	9	DNS	DNS	18
5	Lex Lasry	Triumph GT6	Lex Lasry	B	3	3	7	3	16
6	Norman Carr	Austin-Healey Sprite; Lotus Elan	Norman Carr	B	2	-	2	11	15
7	Gordon Dobie	Datsun 260Z	Gordon Dobie	A	DNS	DNS	8	5	13
8	Bernie Bisseling	Lotus Elan	Norman Carr	B	DNS	DNS	12	DNS	12
9	Don Hume	Lotus 47	Don Hume	B	6	4	1	DNS	11
10	Dick Smith	Lotus Super 7	Dick Smith	B	4	6	-	-	10
11	Rusty French	De Tomaso Pantera	Rusty French	A	4	5	-	-	9
12	Chris Swingler	Triumph TR7	Chris Swingler	B	?	?	?	?	8
13	Rex Colliver	Lotus Elan	R. Colliver	B	?	?	?	?	6
14	Ross Mathieson	Porsche Carrera	Ross Mathieson	A	?	?	?	?	4
15	Alan Edwards	Bolwell Nagari	Alan Edwards	A	2	-	-	-	2
=	Geoff Munyard	Triumph TR4	G. Westwell	A	?	?	?	?	2
