= 1985 Australian Drivers' Championship =

Motor racing competition

Seasons
- ← 1984 1986 →

The 1985 Australian Drivers' Championship was a CAMS sanctioned Australian motor racing title open to racing cars complying with Formula Mondial. It was the 29th Australian Drivers' Championship and the fourth to be contested by Formula Pacific-based Australian Formula 1 cars or by the similar Formula Mondial cars. The championship winner was awarded the 1985 CAMS Gold Star.

Tasmanian driver John Bowe successfully defended his 1984 Australian Drivers' Championship crown in his Ralt RT4 Ford. Bowe dominated, winning the first four rounds of the series to take a twelve-point victory over Peter Hopwood (Ralt RT4 Ford). Peter Macrow (Cheetah Mk.8 Ford) was a very distant third in the series, only moving into the position when he won the final round at Sandown Park.

== Calendar ==
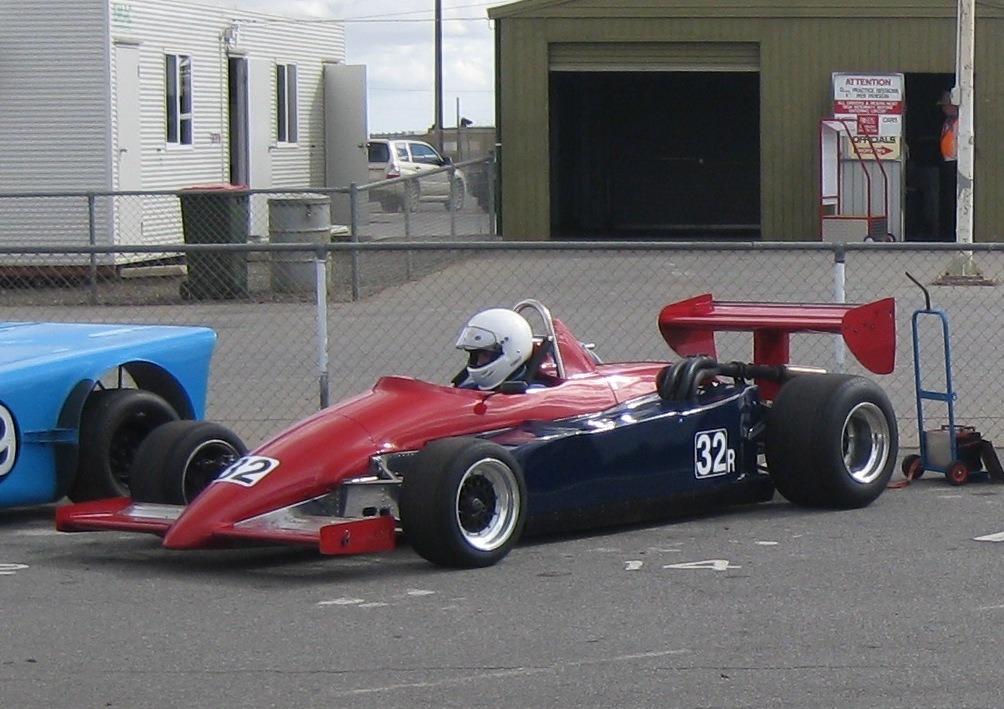
John Bowe won the championship driving a Ralt RT4, similar to the example pictured above

The championship was contested over a five-round series with one race per round.

Round	Round name	Circuit	Date	Winner	Car
1		Wanneroo Park	31 March	John Bowe	Ralt RT4/85 Ford
2		Amaroo Park	26 May	John Bowe	Ralt RT4/85 Ford
3		Lakeside	21 July	John Bowe	Ralt RT4/85 Ford
4		Oran Park	18 August	John Bowe	Ralt RT4/85 Ford
5	Victoria Trophy	Sandown Park	15 September	Peter Macrow	Cheetah Mk8 Ford

== Points system ==
Championship points were awarded on a 9-6-4-3-2-1 basis to the first six placegetters at each round.

== Championship results ==
Position	Driver	No.	Car	Entrant	Wan	Ama	Lak	Ora	San	Total
1	John Bowe	1	Ralt RT4/85 Ford	Chris Leach Enterprises	9	9	9	9	-	36
2	Peter Hopwood	22	Ralt RT4/85 Ford	Manage Racing Team	6	6	6	6	-	24
3	Peter Macrow	25	Cheetah Mk8 Ford	Peter Macrow	-	-	-	2	9	11
4	Brian Sampson	78	Cheetah Mk8 Ford & Ralt RT4 Ford	Brian Sampson	-	-	-	3	6	9
5	Terry Ryan	36	Ralt RT4 Ford	Terry Ryan Automotive	-	3	-	4	-	7
=	Bob Creasy	6	Ralt RT4/81 Ford		3	-	-	-	4	7
7	Keith McClelland	16	Ralt RT4 Ford	Manage Racing Team	-	2	4	-	-	6
=	Ross Zampatti	2	Ralt RT4/81 Ford	Ross Zampatti	4	-	2	-	-	6
9	Bruce Connolloy		Ralt RT4 Ford		-	4	-	-	-	4
10	Chris Hocking	74	Ralt RT4 Ford	Chris Hocking	-	-	3	-	-	3
=	Peter Boylan	21 & 7	Ralt RT4/81 Ford	Peter Boylan	1	-	1	-	1	3
=	Geoff Nicol		Ralt RT4/81 Ford		-	-	-	-	3	3
=	Brett Fisher	13	Liston BF1 Ford		2	-	-	1	-	3
14	Max Freeland	15	Ralt RT4 Ford	Jeff Sherriff	-	-	-	-	2	2
15	Graham Watson	8	Ralt RT4 Ford	Watson Motor Racing	-	1	-	-	-	1
