= 1980 Australian Sports Car Championship =

Australian sports car racing

Seasons
- ← 1979 1981 →

The 1980 Australian Sports Car Championship was a CAMS sanctioned Australian motor racing title open to Group D Production Sports Cars. The title, which was the twelfth Australian Sports Car Championship, was won by Allan Moffat, driving a Porsche 930 Turbo.

== Calendar ==
The championship was contested over a five-round series with two heats per round.

Round	Circuit	State	Date	Winner	Car
1	Sandown Park	Victoria	24 February	Allan Moffat	Porsche 930 Turbo
2	Baskerville	Tasmania	20 April	Allan Moffat	Porsche 930 Turbo
3	Amaroo Park	New South Wales	13 July	John Latham	Porsche Turbo
4	Winton	Victoria	24 August	Allan Moffat	Porsche 930 Turbo
5	Calder Raceway	Victoria	16-Nov	John Latham	Porsche Turbo

== Classes ==
Cars competed in two engine displacement classes:

- Up to and including 2000cc
- Over 2000cc

== Points system ==
Round results were determined by allocating points on a 20-16-13-11-10-9-8-7-6-5-4-3-2-1 basis for the top fourteen places in each heat. Where drivers attained the same number of points, the placings achieved in the second heat were used to determine the round placing.

Actual championship points were then awarded on a 4-3-2-1 basis for the first four outright places at each round, regardless of class. Additionally, championship points were awarded on a 9-6-4-3-2-1 basis for the first six places in each class at each round.

== Championship results ==
The top nine championship placings were as follows:

Position	Driver	Car	Entrant	San	Bas	Ama	Win	Cal	Total
1	Allan Moffat	Porsche 930 Turbo	Porsche Cars Australia	13	13	9	13	-	48
2	Peter Hopwood	Lotus Elan	PL Hopwood	-	10	10	12	11	43
3	John Latham	Porsche Turbo	John Latham	-	6	13	3	13	35
4	Ross Mathiesen	Porsche Carrera	Agree	9	9	6	8	2	34
5	Murray Bryden	Lotus 7 S4	M Bryden	4	4	6	7	7	28
6	Peter Fitzgerald	Porsche Carrera	Lidsay G Quinn Real Estate	6	-	3	1	9	19
7	Rex Colliver	Lotus 47	R. Colliver	?	?	?	?	?	11
8	Alan Edwards	Bolwell Nagari	Essendon Car Radio	?	?	?	?	?	9
9	Bob Kennedy	Triumph TR5	R Kennedy	?	?	?	?	?	8
