= 1982 Australian Sports Car Championship =

Seasons
- ← 1981 1983 →

The 1982 Australian Sports Car Championship was a CAMS sanctioned Australian motor racing title open to Group A Sports Cars. It was the fourteenth Australian Sports Car Championship, and the first to be contested by Group A cars since 1975. The championship was won by Chris Clearihan of Canberra, driving a Kaditcha.

== Schedule ==
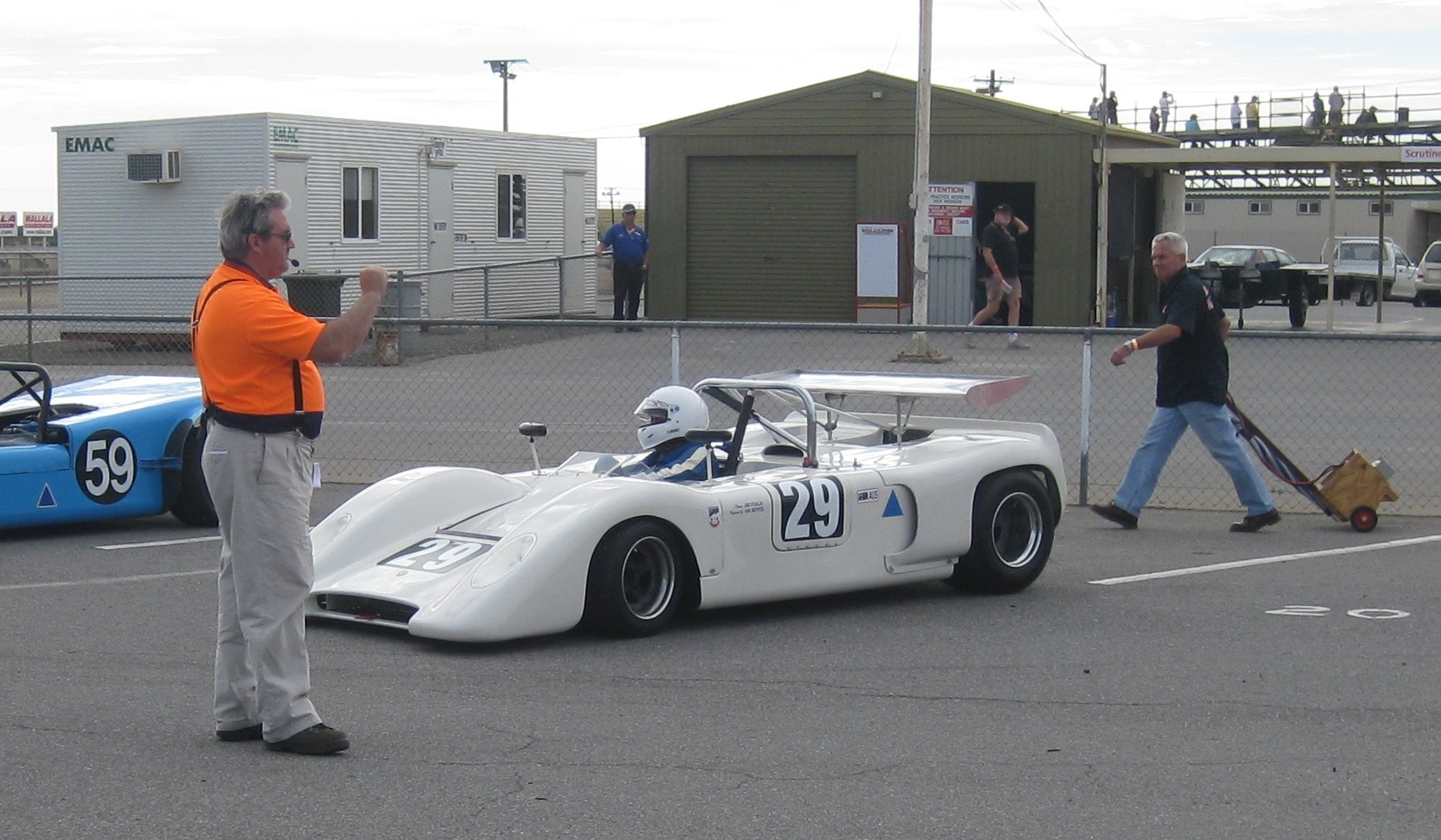
Paul Scott placed 4th in the championship, driving a Rennmax BN6 BMW (actual car pictured, in 2010)

The championship was contested over a four-round series.

Round	Circuit	State	Date	Format	Winning driver	Car
1	Wanneroo Park	Western Australia	21 March	Two heats	Stuart Kostera	Elfin MS7 Repco Holden
2	Lakeside	Queensland	25 July	Two heats	Ken Peters	Auscam
3	Surfers Paradise	Queensland	29 August	One race	Chris Clearihan	Kaditcha Chevrolet
4	Adelaide International Raceway	South Australia	26 September	Two heats	Chris Clearihan	Kaditcha Chevrolet

== Class structure ==
Cars competed in two classes:

- Under 2.5 litres
- Over 2.5 litres

== Points system ==
Championship points were awarded at each round on a 9-6-4-3-2-1 basis for the first six places in each class, Additional points were awarded on a 4-3-2-1 basis for the first four outright places, irrespective of class.

For rounds which were contested over two heats, drivers were allocated points on a 20-16-13-11-10-9-8-7-6-5-4-3-2-1 basis for the first 14 places in each heat, with the points from the two heats aggregated to determine the round result. Championship points where then awarded based on that round result.

== Results ==
Position	Driver	Car	Class	Entrant	Wan.	Lak.	Sur.	Ade.	Total
1	Chris Clearihan	Kaditcha Chevrolet	Over 2.5 litres	Chris Clearihan	3	-	13	13	29
3	Steve Webb	Kaditcha Chevrolet	Over 2.5 litres	Steve Webb	4	9	-	9	22
2	John Fraser	Kaditcha SR781 Chevrolet Vega	Under 2.5 litres	John R Fraser	-	4	12	4	20
4	Paul Scott	Rennmax BN6 BMW	Under 2.5 litres	Pool Fabrications Pty Ltd	-	11	5	2	18
5	Stuart Kostera	Elfin MS7 Repco Holden	Over 2.5 litres	Stuart Kostera	13	-	-	4	17
6	Ken Peters	Auscam	Over 2.5 litres		-	13	3	-	16
7	Julien Cowan	Chevron	Under 2.5 litres		12	-	-	-	12
8	Dean Hosking	Asp Clubman	Under 2.5 litres	Parafield Auto Wreckers	-	-	-	11	11
9	Derek Vince	Graduate M8F	Over 2.5 litres		8	-	-	-	8
=	Ray Hanger	Rennmax	Under 2.5 litres	Ray Hanger	-	-	8	-	8
11	John Hurney	Haggis	Under 2.5 litres		7	-	-	-	7
=	Jim Doig	Motorlab Asp	Under 2.5 litres	Jim Doig	-	-	-	7	7
=	Kerry Horgan	Elfin 360	Over 2.5 litres		-	3	4	-	7
14	Mike Shaw	Welsor	Under 2.5 litres		-	6	-	-	6
=	Alan Nolan	Nola	Over 2.5 litres		-	-	6	-	6
16	Tony Green	Centaur	Under 2.5 litres		-	4	1	-	5
17	Trevor Hine	Lotus Elan	Under 2.5 litres		4	-	-	-	4
=	Paul Gibson	Rennmax	Over 2.5 litres		-	4	-	-	4
19	Glen Baker	Asp 340C	Under 2.5 litres		3	-	-	-	3
=	Peter Tighe	Mallock U2	Under 2.5 litres		-	-	3	-	3
=	Bernard van Elsen	Bolwell Nagari	Over 2.5 litres	Bernard van Elsen	-	-	-	3	3
=	Tom Hutchinson	Triumph GT6	Under 2.5 litres	Tom Hutchinson	-	-	-	3	3
23	Dave Bunnett	Haggis Clubman	Under 2.5 litres		2	-	-	-	2
=	Peter Boylan	Cheetah	Under 2.5 litres		-	2	-	-	2
=	Colin Matheson	Gordon	Under 2.5 litres		-	-	2	-	2
26	Allen Swaine	Nota	Under 2.5 litres		-	1	-	-	1
=	Chris Meulengraaf	Datsun 2000	Under 2.5 litres	Chris Meulengraaf	-	-	-	1	1
