= 1983 Australian Sports Car Championship =

Seasons
- ← 1982 1984 →

The 1983 Australian Sports Car Championship was a CAMS sanctioned motor racing title for drivers of Group A Sports Cars. It was the fifteenth Australian Sports Car Championship.

Peter Hopwood, driving the Steve Webb owned Kaditcha Chevrolet, won the championship from Ray Hanger in a Rennmax Ford. Defending champion Chris Clearihan finished third in his older model Kaditcha Chevrolet.

The 1983 championship saw the debut of the Bap Romano owned and driven Kaditcha K583 Cosworth, the first Australian Group A Sports Car built with a closed top and Ground effects aerodynamics (Clearihan's Kaditcha also appeared with a bolted on closed top in the early rounds of the season but the top was later removed). The K583 would prove to be the fastest car in the field in 1983, and would compete in Class B as the ex-McLaren Cosworth DFV V8 was a 3.0 litre engine. However, unreliability and a disqualification for dangerous driving in Round 4 at Lakeside (Hopwood also received the same penalty at Lakeside) saw Romano only finish sixth in the championship.

After finishing the opening round at Sandown in 2nd place overall and showing that he had the speed to at least match the Kaditcha Chevrolets of Hopwood and Clearihan, the challenge from Tasmanian Johnnie Walker, driving a 1969 model Elfin ME5, ended after the car was sold to a NSW based enthusiast following the opening round. The car was parked and neither it nor Walker took any further part in the series. Another potential challenger was the Mazda 12A rotary powered Tiga SC80 of Adelaide's Richard Warland (the car was driven in later rounds by open wheel driver John Smith). The car proved quick but poor reliability from the Barry Jones built Mazda engine, the cars unnerving habit of shedding rear wheels, plus a big crash by Smith in the final round at Winton put paid to the cars chances.

== Calendar ==
The championship was contested over five rounds with two heats per round.

Round	Circuit	State	Date	Format	Heat winners	Car	Round winner
1	Sandown Park	Victoria	20 February	Two heats	Peter Hopwood; Peter Hopwood	Kaditcha Chevrolet; Kaditcha Chevrolet	Peter Hopwood
2	Adelaide International Raceway	South Australia	1 May	Two heats	Peter Hopwood; Bap Romano	Kaditcha Chevrolet; Kaditcha K583 Cosworth	Peter Hopwood
3	Oran Park	New South Wales	29 May	Two heats	Peter Hopwood; John Smith	Kaditcha Chevrolet; Tiga SC80 Mazda	Peter Hopwood
4	Lakeside	Queensland	23 July	Two heats	Chris Clearihan; Chris Clearihan	Kaditcha Chevrolet; Kaditcha Chevrolet	Ray Hanger
5	Winton	Victoria	14 August	Two heats	Bap Romano; Bap Romano	Kaditcha K583 Cosworth; Kaditcha K583 Cosworth	Bap Romano

- Both heats of the Lakeside round were won by Bap Romano from Peter Hopwood, however both drivers were excluded from the round for improper driving.

== Classes and points system ==
Cars were classified into three classes based on engine displacement.

- Class A : Up to 1.6 litres
- Class B : 1.6 to 3 litres
- Class C : Over 3 litres

Points were allocated for outright placings gained in each race with Scale A used for drivers of Class A cars, Scale B for drivers of Class B cars and Scale C for drivers of Class C cars.

Outright Position	1	2	3	4	5	6	7	8	9	10	11	12	13	14	15	16	17	18	19	20
Scale A	30	27	24	21	19	17	15	14	13	12	11	10	9	8	7	6	5	4	3	2
Scale B	28	26	23	20	17	15	14	13	12	11	10	9	8	7	6	5	4	3	2	1
Scale C	25	23	20	17	15	13	11	10	9	8	7	6	5	4	3	2	1	-	-	-

A driver's points from both races at each round were aggregated and the result divided by two to arrive at the championship points allocation for the driver at that round.

== Championship standings ==
Position	Driver	No.	Car	Entrant	Class	Rd1 Sandown	Rd2 Adelaide	Rd3 Oran Park	Rd4 Lakeside	Rd5 Winton	Total
1	Peter Hopwood	22	Kaditcha Chevrolet	Steve Webb	C	25	24	24	-	23	96
2	Ray Hanger	24	Rennmax Ford BDA	Ray Hanger	A	20	-	21½	25½	22½	89½
3	Chris Clearihan	1	Kaditcha Chevrolet	Canberra Sports Car Club	C	11½	20	21½	25	6½	84½
4	Carl Gibson	11	Rennmax Repco	Carl Gibson	B	6½	11½	10½	-	21½	50
5	Bernie Van Elsen	14	Bolwell Nagari	Bernie Van Elsen	C	17½	13	13	-	-	43½
6	Bap Romano	8	Kaditcha K583 Cosworth	Kaditcha Factory Racing Team	B	-	14	-	-	28	42
7	Robert Pitman	38	U2 Clubman	R. Pitman	A	14	-	-	-	14½	28½
8	Paul Scott	6	Kaditcha Cosworth Vega	Pool Fab	B	-	11½	-	13	-	24½
9	Gregory Gardiner		Bulant		A	-	-	7	14½	-	21½
=	Johnnie Walker	83	Elfin ME5	J.Walker	C	21½	-	-	-	-	21½

- The above table lists only the top ten pointscorers.
