= Australian Sports Car Championship =

- Category: Sports Car Racing
- Country: Australia
- Inaugural season: 1969
- Folded: 1988
- Last Drivers' champion: (Australia) Alan Nolan

The Australian Sports Car Championship was the national title for sports car racing drivers sanctioned by the Confederation of Australian Motor Sport from 1969 to 1988. Each championship was contested over a series of races with the exception of the 1975 title, which was awarded on the results of a single race held at the Phillip Island circuit in Victoria.

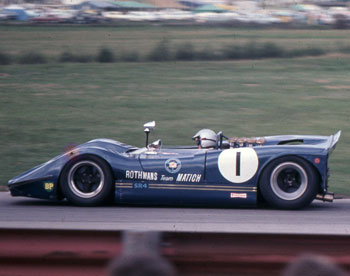
The Matich SR4 Repco was driven to victory in the 1969 Australian Sports Car Championship by Frank Matich

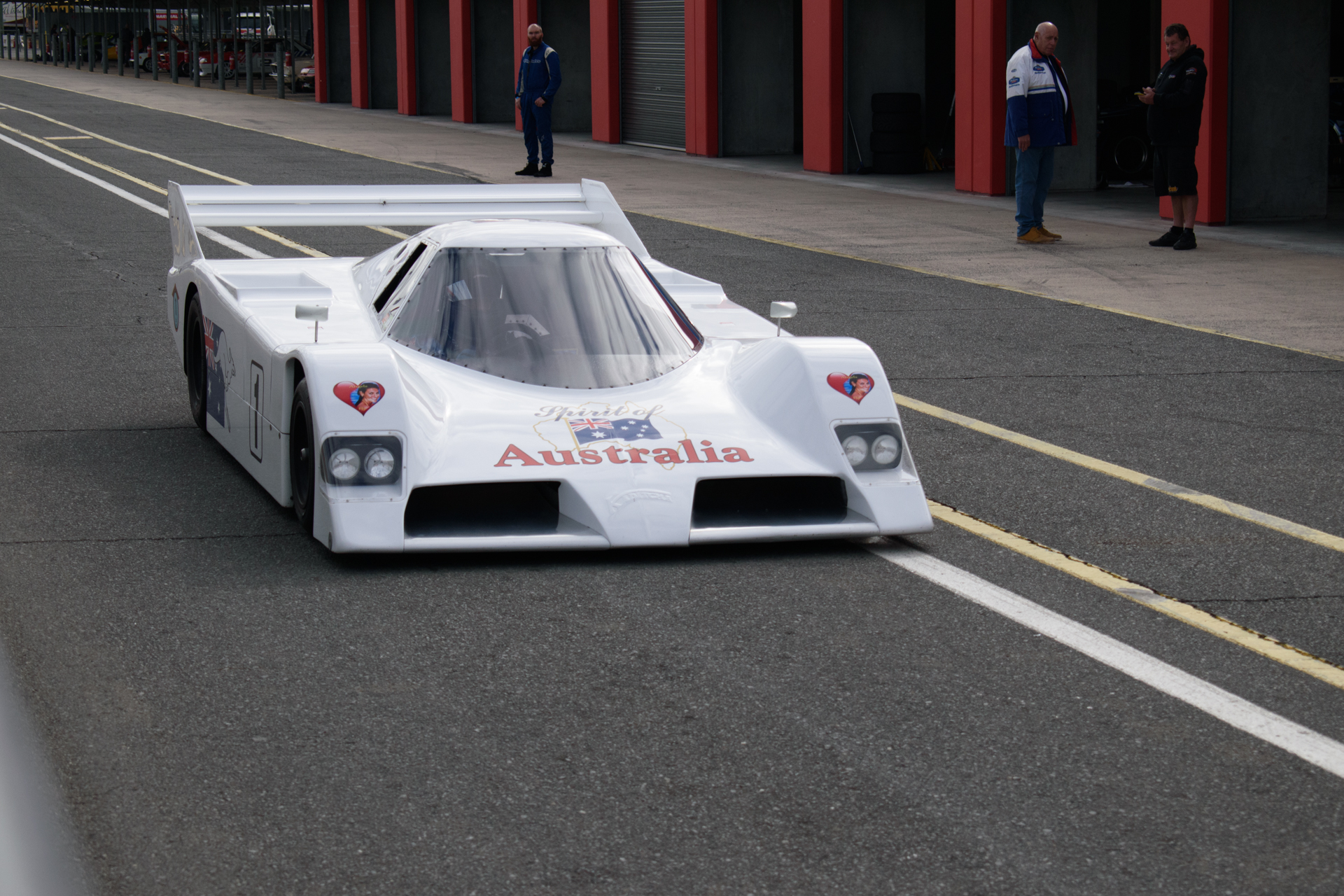
The Romano WE84 with which Bap Romano won the 1984 championship. The car is pictured in 2025.

Championship races were open to purpose-built sports racing cars complying with CAMS Group A Sports Car regulations except for the years 1976 to 1981 in which they were restricted to Group D Production Sports Cars.

Local manufacturers Matich, Elfin, Kaditcha, and K&A Engineering (Veskanda C1), along with McLaren dominated the series when run under Group A rules, while Porsche drivers won all six Group D based championships.

The championship winners are listed below.

Year	Champion	Vehicle
1969	Frank Matich	Matich SR4 Repco
1970	Peter Woodward	Elfin 350 Coventry Climax
1971	John Harvey	McLaren M6B Repco
1972	John Harvey	McLaren M6B Repco
1973	Phil Moore	Elfin 360 Repco
1974	Henry Michel	Elfin 360 Repco
1975	Garrie Cooper	Elfin MS7 Repco Holden
1976	Ian Geoghegan	Porsche Carrera
1977	Alan Hamilton; John Latham	Porsche 934 Turbo; Porsche Carrera RSR
1978	Ross Mathiesen	Porsche Carrera
1979	Ross Mathiesen	Porsche Carrera
1980	Allan Moffat	Porsche 930 Turbo
1981	John Latham	Porsche 930 Turbo
1982	Chris Clearihan	Kaditcha Chevrolet
1983	Peter Hopwood	Kaditcha Chevrolet
1984	Bap Romano	Romano WE84 Cosworth
1985	Chris Clearihan	Kaditcha Chevrolet
1986	John Bowe	Veskanda C1 Chevrolet
1987	Andy Roberts	Roberts SR3 Ford
1988	Alan Nolan	Nola Chevrolet
