= Kaditcha =

Former Australian automobile manufacturer

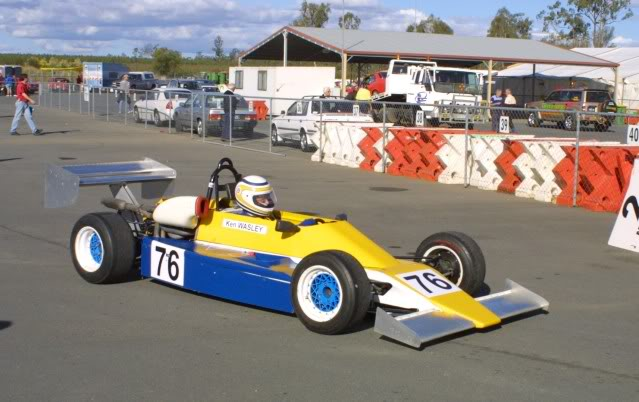
Kaditcha 76F2 Formula 2 car

Kaditcha was an automobile manufacturer in Australia. The company, formed by Queensland engineer Barry Lock, made open wheel and sports car racing cars, including cars for Formula Pacific and Australian Formula 2.

== Sports cars ==
The peak of Kaditcha's form was in the mid-1980s when Kaditcha sports cars dominated the Australian Sports Car Championship. Chris Clearihan won the 1982 Championship in a 5.0L Chevrolet powered version, with Kaditcha's finishing that year in 1st, 2nd and 3rd places. Clearihan finished 3rd in the 1983 Championship, which was won by Peter Hopwood driving a later model Kaditcha-Chevrolet that Lock built using a Lola T400 Formula 5000 as its base. Hopwood moved to the Australian Drivers' Championship in 1984 with Clearihan taking over the 1983 title winning car and finished second in the 1984 Championship.

Kadticha's most famous race car is one that no longer bears its name. The Romano WE84 raced by Bap Romano began its racing life in 1983 as the Kaditcha K583. Romano used the WE84 (re-engineered by former Williams and Tyrrell Formula One mechanic Wayne Eckersley) to easily win the 1984 Australian Sports Car Championship. It was Australia's first Group A Sports Car built with a closed top and Ground effects aerodynamics like the cars, such as the Porsche 956, seen at the time in the World Endurance Championship. Bap Romano's 1984 ASSC domination was almost complete, setting Pole Position at every round, scoring fastest lap at for each race contested (Clearihan scored fastest lap in Heat 2 of Round 1), and won all bar Round 1 at Calder Park where Romano crashed heavily in Heat 1, damaging the car enough to ensure it was a non-starter in Heat 2. Clearihan's Kaditcha-Chev won Round 1.

Most Kaditcha sports cars were powered by either the 5.0L Chevrolet V8 engine, or in the case of the SR781 run by Jeff Harris, the Mazda 13B rotary engine. The K583/WE84 was at first powered by the 3.0L Cosworth DFV V8, originally developed for Formula One. Romano upgraded to the 3.9L Cosworth DFL in late 1984 for the 1984 Sandown 1000 World Endurance Championship race at Sandown in Melbourne. Currently the car runs the 3.5L Cosworth DFZ V8, with Romano having Barry Lock rebuild the car in 2010 following its major crash at Amaroo Park in 1986, the crash ending the cars original racing life.

After the front end (including the cockpit) of the WE84 was all but destroyed at Amaroo Park in 1986, it sat in storage for a number of years, though has since been restored by Romano and Lock. While it still carries the name of the 1984 Australian Sports Car Champion, the front nose of the car has retained the moulded Kaditcha logo pointing to its original roots.

== Open wheelers ==
Kaditcha manufactured cars for open wheel racing, including cars for Formula Pacific and Formula 2. A Kaditcha appeared at the 1981 Australian Grand Prix at Calder Park. Peter Larner qualifying his 1.6L Ford powered car 16th (only 1.5 seconds slower than pole and race winner Roberto Moreno in a Ralt RT4). Larner finished 11th, 3 laps down on Moreno. Ian Bland then drove a Kaditcha in the 1983 Australian Grand Prix, qualifying 20th (out of 24), and finishing 16th (and last), 23 laps down on race winner Moreno after a series of mechanical drama's through the race.

Sydney driver Tom Brickley leased the Cosworth BDG-powered Formula Pacific Kaditcha FA82A for the 1984 Australian Grand Prix at Calder Park Raceway. He qualified 22nd of 25 entrants. Brickley collided with eventual race winner Roberto Moreno on lap 75 of 100, and was spectacularly inverted. He later bought the car, converted it to Australian Formula 2 specifications, and won the unofficial Australian Formula 2 Championship in 2000. (The Confederation of Australian Motor Sport's recognition of the Australian Formula 2 Championship as a national title did not extend beyond 1988.)

A Kaditcha manufactured car also won the 1990 Australian Hillclimb Championship in the hands of Ivan Tighe using Cosworth BDG power.

== Barry Lock ==
Before forming Kaditcha, Lock had been a successful engineer with the McLaren team in Can-Am racing. He was later involved in the Giocattolo project and the Infiniti sports racing car.
