= Lola T610 =

Sports prototype race car

- Category: Group C
- Constructor: Lola Cars
- Designer(s): Eric Broadley

Technical specifications
- Chassis: Aluminum monocoque
- Suspension (front): Double wishbones, coil-over dampers
- Suspension (rear): Double wishbones, coil-over dampers
- Length: 4,737 mm (186.5 in)
- Width: 1,994 mm (78.5 in)
- Height: 1,054 mm (41.5 in)
- Axle track: 1,575 mm (62.0 in) (front); 1,549 mm (61.0 in) (rear)
- Wheelbase: 2,705 mm (106.5 in)
- Engine: Ford-Cosworth DFL, 3,298 cc (201.3 cu in), mid-mounted, N/A DOHC V8
- Transmission: Hewland 5 speed manual
- Power: 490–550 hp (365–410 kW)
- Weight: 920 kg (2,030 lb)

Competition history
Races	Wins	Podiums	Poles	F/Laps
33	1	10	0	0
- Constructors' Championships: 0
- Drivers' Championships: 0

The Lola T610 was a ground effect Group C sports prototype race car, designed, developed and built by British manufacturer Lola, for sports car racing, specifically the IMSA GTP Championship, World Sportscar Championship and 24 Hours of Le Mans, between 1982 and 1984. A total of two models were produced.
