= Group A Sports Cars =

Australian motor racing regulations

Group A Sports Cars is an Australian motor racing category that CAMS formulated for sports car racing in Australia. Introduced in 1964, it continues today under the name Group 2A Sports Cars.

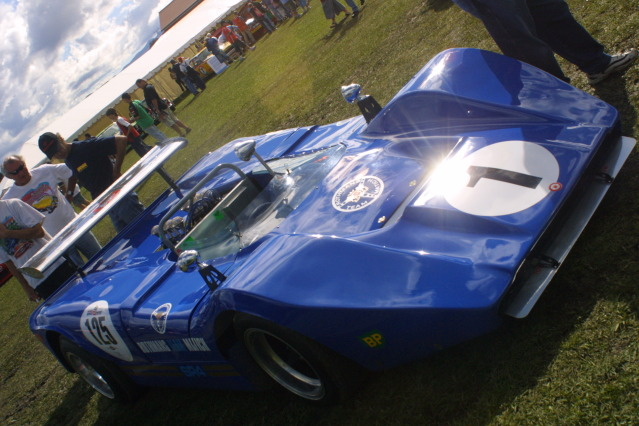
The Matich SR4 Repco competed in Australia as a Group A Sports Car in 1969 and 1970

On introduction in 1964, Group A catered only for closed sports racing cars with their open top counterparts continuing under existing CAMS Appendix C Sports Car regulations. For 1965, the Appendix C Sports Cars category was discontinued with Group A now catering for both open and closed sports cars. Vehicles were required to have two seats, two doors, mudguards, and an electrical system with operable lights, horn, and starter. Although the rules required that cars also be capable of being registered for road use, the category was not intended for production based cars, which were accommodated by two other newly introduced CAMS categories, Group B Improved Production Sports Cars and Group D Series Production Sports Cars.

Initially, mechanical elements under Group A were virtually unrestricted, almost like Group 7 Can-Am racing in North America with a number of cars resembling Can-Am cars, especially the Matich SR3 (which Frank Matich actually raced in Can-Am) and SR4's, the Elfin ME5 and MS7's and the Kaditcha's of the early 1980s. However, unlike Can-Am where high horsepower, big block 7.0 L (430 cu in) V8 engines (usually a Chevrolet) and turbocharged Flat 12 engine's were the norm, CAMS announced the introduction of a 5-litre engine capacity limit during 1966. The engine capacity limit would remain at 5.0 L (310 cu in) until it was lifted to 6.0 L (370 cu in) in 1986. Australia's Group D GT cars (which ran in the Australian GT Championship) had already been running to a 6.0 L (370 cu in) capacity limit since 1982

Group A cars contested Australia’s premier sports car event, the Australian Tourist Trophy, each year from 1965 to 1968 and were then granted their own national series in 1969 with the introduction of the Australian Sports Car Championship. When this title was moved across to Group D Production Sports Cars in 1976, Group A cars would again contest the annual Australian Tourist Trophy although this title was discontinued for a second time after 1979. The Australian Sports Car Championship was once more opened up to Group A Sports Cars in 1982 and they would contest that title until its final running in 1988.

The Group A Sports Cars officially became known as Group 2A Sports Cars in 1988 and is still listed by CAMS as a current Australian motor sport category. The rules have remained basically the same as those for Group A in 1965. However the category no longer enjoys the profile it once had in Australian motor sport, and mainly applies today for historic motor racing with even state championship appearances being rare. Group 2C Sports Cars, also known as Supersports, is now the highest profile Sports Car category in Australia.

Some of the Group A Sports Cars that were designed and built in Australia include various, Rennmax's and Kaditcha's, the Elfin ME5 and MS7, the Matich SR3 and SR4, Bap Romano's Romano WE84 Cosworth (which actually started its life as a Kaditcha K583) and Bernie Van Elsen's Chevrolet V8 powered Veskanda C1 driven by John Bowe. These were joined by various famous international marques including Lola, Lotus, McLaren, Alfa Romeo and Porsche.
