= 1978 Australian Sports Car Championship =

Seasons
- ← 1977 1979 →

The 1978 Australian Sports Car Championship was an Australian motor racing competition for Group D Production Sports Cars. It was sanctioned by the Confederation of Australian Motor Sport as an Australian National Title and it was the tenth Australian Sports Car Championship.

The championship was won by Ross Mathiesen driving a Porsche Carrera.

== Calendar ==
The championship was contested over a four-round series.

Round	Circuit	State	Date	Format	Round winner	Car
1	Calder	Victoria	10 March	Two heats	Ross Bond	Bolwell Nagari
2	Lakeside International Raceway	Queensland	2 April	Two heats	Ross Mathiesen	Porsche Carrera
3	Amaroo Park	New South Wales	21 May	One race	Ross Bond	Bolwell Nagari
4	Winton	Victoria	20 August	Two heats	Ross Mathiesen	Porsche Carrera

== Classes ==
Cars competed in two engine displacement classes.

- Up to and including 2000cc
- Over 2000cc

== Points system ==
Championship points were awarded at each round on a 9-6-4-3-2-1 basis to the first six finishers in each class, and on a 4-3-2-1 to the first four finisher outright, irrespective of class.

At rounds which were contested over two heats, round placings were determined by allocating "points" to the first fourteen placegetters in each heat on a 20-16-13-11-10-9-8-7-6-5-4-3-2-1 basis. Where more than one driver attained the same total, the relevant round placing was awarded to the driver gaining the higher place in the last heat. Actual championship points were then awarded based on the calculated round placings.

== Championship results ==
Position	Driver	Car	Entrant	Class	Calder	Lakeside	Amaroo	Winton	Total
1	Ross Mathiesen	Porsche Carrera	Ross Mathiesen	Over 2000cc	9	13	9	13	44
2	Bill Evans	Triumph TR7	Playboy Racing Team	Up to 2000cc	9	9	4	10	32
=	Ross Bond	Bolwell Nagari	Ross Bond	Over 2000cc	13	6	13	-	32
4	Allan Hanns	Datsun 2000	Allan Hanns	Up to 2000cc	6	4	9	2	21
5	John Latham	Porsche Carrera	John Latham	Over 2000cc	-	9	-	9	18
6	Alan Edwards	Bolwell Nagari	Alan Edwards	Over 2000cc	6	4	2	2	14
7	Ray Julian	Datsun 2000	Ray Julian	Up to 2000cc	1	6	6	-	13
8	Neal Swingler	Triumph GT6	Neal Swingler	Up to 2000cc	3	2	-	6	11
=	Warwick Henderson	Chevrolet Corvette (C3)	W. Henderson	Over 2000cc	4	2	4	1	11
10	Peter Fitzgerald	Porsche 911S	Complan	Over 2000cc	-	-	6	3	9
11	Fernando D'Alberto	Datsun 260Z	Fernando D'Alberto	Over 2000cc	2	-	-	6	8
12	Bob Kennedy	Triumph TR5	Bob Kennedy	Up to 2000cc	4	3	-	-	7
13	Chris Swingler	Triumph Spitfire	Autocarb	Up to 2000cc	2	-	-	3	5
14	Rex Colliver	Lotus 47		Up to 2000cc	-	-	-	4	4
15	Anthony Timmins	Austin-Healey Sprite		Up to 2000cc	-	-	3	-	3
=	Ellen Reed	MG Midget	Ellen Reed	Up to 2000cc	-	1	2	-	3
17	Bernard van Elsen	Bolwell	Bernard van Elsen	Over 2000cc	1	-	-	-	1
=	Michael Finnis	Jaguar E-Type	Michael Finnis	Over 2000cc	-	1	-	-	1
=	Matt Pintar	Bolwell Mark 7		Over 2000cc	-	-	-	1	1
=	Gary Ryan	Triumph Spitfire		Up to 2000cc	-	-	-	1	1
