= 1979 Australian Sports Car Championship =

Seasons
- ← 1978 1980 →

The 1979 Australian Sports Car Championship was a CAMS sanctioned motor racing title for drivers of Group D Production Sports Cars. It was the eleventh Australian Sports Car Championship and the fourth to be restricted to cars complying with Group D regulations.

The championship was won by Ross Mathieson driving a Porsche Carrera.

== Schedule ==
The championship was contested over four rounds.

Round	Circuit	State	Date	Format	Round winner	Car
1	Baskerville	Tasmania	22 April	Two Heats	Peter Fitzgerald	Porsche Carrera
2	Calder	Victoria	27 May	One race	Ross Mathieson	Porsche Carrera
3	Winton	Victoria	19 August	One race	Ross Mathieson	Porsche Carrera
4	Calder	Victoria	25 November	One race	John Gourlay	Bolwell Nagari

== Class structure ==
Cars competed in two engine capacity classes:

- Up to and including 2000cc
- Over 2000cc

== Points system ==
Championship points were awarded on a 9-6-4-3-2-1 basis for the first six places in each class at each round and on a 4-3-2-1 basis for the first four outright places at each round.

For Round 1, the round results, on which championship points were awarded, were determined by allocating race points on a 20-16-13-11-10-9-8-9-7-6-5-4-3-2-1 for the first 14 outright places in each race and aggregating the points for each driver. Where more than one driver attained the same total, the superior round position was awarded to the higher placed driver in the second race.

== Results ==
Position	Driver	Car	Bas.	Cal.	Win.	Cal.	Total
1	Ross Mathieson	Porsche Carrera	6	13	13	6	38
2	Peter Fitzgerald	Porsche Carrera	13	6	9	9	37
3	Bernie Bisseling	Lotus 47	9	9	1	6	25
4	John Gourlay	Bolwell Nagari	9	-	-	13	22
5	Rex Colliver	Lotus 47	4	-	4	9	17
5	Tim Briglia	Lotus Elan	-	4	9	4	17
7	Murray Bryden	Lotus Elan	6	6	-	-	12
8	Chris Swingler	Triumph TR7	3	3	2	3	11
9	John Latham	Bolwell Nagari	-	-	6	4	10
10	Warwick Henderson	Chevrolet Corvette C3	-	9	-	-	9
11	Neal Swingler	Triumph GT6	2	4	-	-	6
12	Paul Trevathan	MGB GT V8	-	4	-	-	4
12	Barry Main	Bolwell Nagari	1	3	-	-	4
12	Alan Edwards	Bolwell Nagari	-	-	4	-	4
15	Dick Smith	Lotus Super Seven	-	3	-	-	3
16	Ross Bond	Bolwell Nagari	2	-	-	-	2
16	Gordon Dobie	Datsun 2000	-	2	-	-	2
16	Steve Wherrett	Chevrolet Corvette	-	-	2	-	2
16	Allan Hanns	Bolwell Nagari	-	-	-	2	2
20	Tim Edmonds	MGB	1	-	-	-	1
20	Peter Boston	Austin-Healey 100	-	1	-	-	1
20	Geoff Dennis	Triumph GT6	-	1	-	-	1
20	Ranald MacLurkin	TVR Griffith	-	-	1	-	1
