= 1975 Australian Tourist Trophy =

The 1975 Australian Tourist Trophy was a motor race staged at the Calder circuit in Victoria, Australia on 25 May 1975. The race was open to Production Sports Cars and was recognized by the Confederation of Australian Motor Sport as an Australian national title race. It was the thirteenth Australian Tourist Trophy and the first to be awarded since 1968. The race, which was contested over two heats, was won by Peter Warren driving a Bolwell Nagari.

== Summary ==
The race was contested over two, 25 lap, 40 km heats. Points were awarded on a 15-14-13-12-10-9-8-7-6-5-4-3-2-1 basis to the first fifteen finishers in each heat.

The first heat was won by Peter Warren and the second by Steve Webb, both driving Bolwell Nagaris. Warren and Paul Trevathan (MGB) finished equal on points after the two heats with Warren initially declared the winner and presented with the trophy based on his better overall combined race time. The decision was then revised with Trevethan determined to be the winner, having finished higher in the second heat. Warren lodged a successful protest based on his faster combined heat times, as per the race regulations.

== Results ==
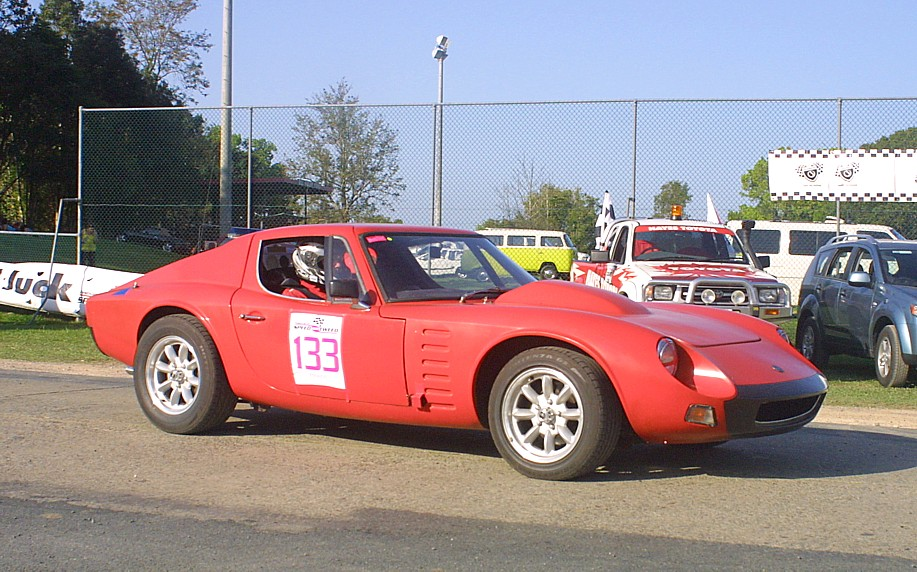
Peter Warren won the 1975 Australian Tourist Trophy driving a Bolwell Nagari, similar to the example pictured above

Position	Driver	No.	Car	Entrant	H1 Pos.	H2 Pos.	Points
1	Peter Warren	38	Bolwell Nagari	Peter Warren	1	6	25
2	Paul Trevethan	20	MGB	Broadwalk MG Centre	5	2	25
3	Wayne Myer	5	Datsun 240Z	Wayne Myer	8	3	21
4	Phil George	9	Datsun 260Z	Phil George	4	8	20
5	Col Matheson	54	Datsun SR311	Col Matheson	3	10	19
6	Gay Cesario	15	Fiat Spider	Gay Cesario	10	4	18
7	Steve Webb	2	Bolwell Nagari	Steve Webb	DNS	1	15
7	John Latham	11	MG Midget	John Latham	?	5	15
7	Dennis Watt	4	Lotus Elan	Dennis Watt	6	11	15
10	Rex Colliver	47	Lotus 47	Rex Colliver Motors	2	DNF	14
11	Doug Seath	31	Bolwell Mark 7	Doug Seath	?	9	12
12	Reg Byrne	61	MGB	Reg Byrne	?	7	9
12	Peter Woodward	46	Lotus 47	Peter Woodward	7	DNF	9
14	Robert Lawrenson	37	MG Midget	Robert Lawrenson	9	?	7
15	Geoff Dennis	39	Triumph Spitfire	Geoff Dennis	?	?	6
16	Mike Holloway	29	Austin Sprite	Mike Holloway	?	?	4
17	Neal Swingler	25	Triumph Spitfire	Neal Swingler	?	?	3
18	Bernie Bisseling	77	Turner Ford	Coopeys Garage	?	?	2
19	John Baragwanath	16	MGB	John Baragwanath	?	?	1
-	Ian McDonald	22	Morgan	Morgan Sports Car Distributors	?	?	-
-	Chris Roberts	36	Lotus Elan	Chris Roberts	DNF	?	-
-	Tim Trevor	64	MG Midget	Tim Trevor Motors	?	?	-
-	Peter Tobin	26	Datsun 260Z	Auto Developments	?	?	-
-	Ken Price	99	MG Midget	Broadwalk MG Centre	?	?	-
-	Bob Kennedy	60	Triumph TR5	Ecurie Triumph	?	?	-
-	Charles Paine	21	Triumph GT6	Broadwalk MG Centre	DNS	?	-
-	Peter Beasley	19	Jensen-Healey	Peter Manton Motors	DNS	?	-
-	Warwick Henderson	12	Chevrolet Corvette	Warwick Henderson	DNS	DNS	-

=== Race statistics ===
- Number of entries: 32
- Number of cars which practiced: 28
- Pole Position: Rex Colliver (Lotus 47), 48.8s
- Fastest lap (Heat 1): Peter Woodward (Lotus 47)
- Fastest lap (Heat 2): Peter Woodward (Lotus 47), 55.0
