= 1977 Australian Sports Car Championship =

Seasons
- ← 1976 1978 →

The 1977 Australian Sports Car Championship was a motor racing competition for Group D Production Sports Cars. It was authorised as an Australian National Title by the Confederation of Australian Motor Sport (CAMS). It was the ninth Australian Sports Car Championship to be awarded by CAMS.

The championship was won jointly by Alan Hamilton and John Latham driving a Porsche 934 Turbo and a Porsche Carrera RSR respectively.

== Calendar ==
The championship was contested over a six-round series.

Round	Circuit	State	Date	Format	Winning driver	Winning car
1	Calder	Victoria	15 January	Two heats	Rusty French	de Tomaso Pantera
2	Adelaide International Raceway	South Australia	3 April	One race	Alan Hamilton	Porsche 934
3	Amaroo Park	New South Wales	29 May	One race	John Latham	Porsche Carrera
4	Lakeside International Raceway	Queensland	24 July	One race	Alan Hamilton	Porsche 934
5	Oran Park	New South Wales	30 October	One race	Alan Hamilton	Porsche 934
6	Phillip Island	Victoria	20 November	One race	Alan Hamilton	Porsche 934

== Classes ==
Cars competed in two engine capacity classes.

- Up to and including 2000cc
- Over 2000cc

== Results ==
Position	Driver	No.	Car	Entrant	Points
1	Alan Hamilton	9	Porsche 934 Turbo	Porsche Distributors	58
=	John Latham	64	Porsche Carrera RSR	Kodak Film	58
3	Peter Hopwood	77	Lotus Elan	Peter Hopwood	33
4	Rusty French	2 & 3	de Tomaso Pantera	Rusty French	31
5	Tim Trevor	47	Lotus 47	Tim Trevor Motors Pty Ltd	21
6	Warwick Henderson	99	Chevrolet Corvette (C3)	Warwick Henderson	15
7	Bernard Bisseling	65	Turner	Bernard Bisseling	13
8	Fernando D'Alberto	33	Datsun 260Z	Fernando D'Alberto	12
9	Alan Hannis	54	Datsun 2000	Bolwell Car Club	10
=	Matt Pintar		MGB	Matt Pintar	10
11	Ray Winter		MGB	Peter McCabe	9
12	Bob Kennedy	60	Triumph TR5	Triumph Sports Owners Association	7
13	Peter Woodward		Lotus 47	Peter Woodward	6
=	Bill Evans	7	Triumph TR7	Playboy Racing	6
=	Barry Main	6	Bolwell Nagari	Barry Main	6
16	Bob Rowntree		MG Midget	Bob Rowntree	4
=	Peter Beasley		MG Midget	Peter Beasley	4
18	Robbie Rowland	26	Austin-Healey 3000	Robbie Rowland	3
=	Bob Johnston		MG Midget	Bob Johnston	3
20	David Henderson		MG Midget	NSSCC	2
=	Peter Fitzgerald		Porsche 911S	Peter Fitzgerald	2
22	John Gourlay	23	Bolwell Nagari	John Gourlay	1

Note: Hamilton achieved four round wins to Latham's one, however there was no countback process incorporated in the points system to act as a tiebreaker, so the two drivers shared the title.
