= 1976 Australian Sports Car Championship =

Seasons
- ← 1975 1977 →

The 1976 Australian Sports Car Championship was an Australian national motor racing title for drivers of Group D Production Sports Cars. It was sanctioned by the Confederation of Australian Motor Sport as the eighth Australian Sports Car Championship and was the first to be restricted to production based cars.

The championship was won by Ian Geoghegan driving a Porsche Carrera.

== Schedule ==
The championship was contested over five rounds:

Round	Circuit	State	Date	Format	Round winner	Car
1	Oran Park	New South Wales	16 May	Two heats	Ian Geoghegan	Porsche Carrera
2	Amaroo Park	New South Wales	30 May	Two heats	Ian Geoghegan	Porsche Carrera
3	Calder	Victoria	8 August	Two heats	Alan Hamilton	Porsche Turbo RSR
4	Hume Weir	Victoria	26 September	Two heats	Alan Hamilton	Porsche Turbo
5	Phillip Island	Victoria	21 November	One race	Alan Hamilton	Porsche 934 Turbo

== Points system ==
Championship points were awarded on a 9, 6, 4, 3, 2, 1 basis for the first six places at each round.

== Championship standings ==
Position	Driver	Car	Entrant	Ora	Ama	Cal	Hum	Phi	Total
1	Ian Geoghegan	Porsche Carrera	Laurex Pty Ltd	9	9	6	6	6	36
2	Alan Hamilton	Porsche Turbo RSR; Porsche 934 Turbo	JAG Team Porsche	-	6	9	9	9	33
3	Rusty French	De Tomaso Pantera	Rusty French	6	2	-	4	4	16
4	Peter Hopwood	Lotus Elan	P Hopwood	3	4	-	-	-	7
5	Paul Trevethan	MGB GT V8	Broadwalk MG Centre	-	-	3	3	-	6
6	Ross Bond	Bolwell Nagari	Ian Morgan	2	3	-	-	-	5
7	Steve Webb	Bolwell Nagari	Eventemp Air Conditioning	4	-	-	-	-	4
=	Peter Woodward	Lotus 47	Peter Woodward	-	-	4	-	-	4
9	Alan Edwards	Bolwell Nagari	Motorfast Datsun	-	-	-	-	3	3
10	Max Grayson	Jaguar E Type		-	-	2	-	-	2
=	John Gourlay	MG Midget	J Gourlay	-	-	-	2	-	2
=	Bob Kennedy	Triumph TR5	Triumph Sports Owners Association	-	-	-	-	2	2
13	Jim Davidson	Lotus Elan	JS Davidson	1	-	-	-	-	1
=	John Latham	Porsche Carrera	J Latham	-	1	-	-	-	1
=	Gay Cesario	Fiat 124 Spider	Gay Cesario	-	-	1	-	-	1
=	Tim Trevor	Lotus 47	Tim Trevor Motors	-	-	-	1	-	1
=	Ken Price	MG Midget	K Price	-	-	-	-	1	1
