= Bolwell =

Australian sports car manufacturing company

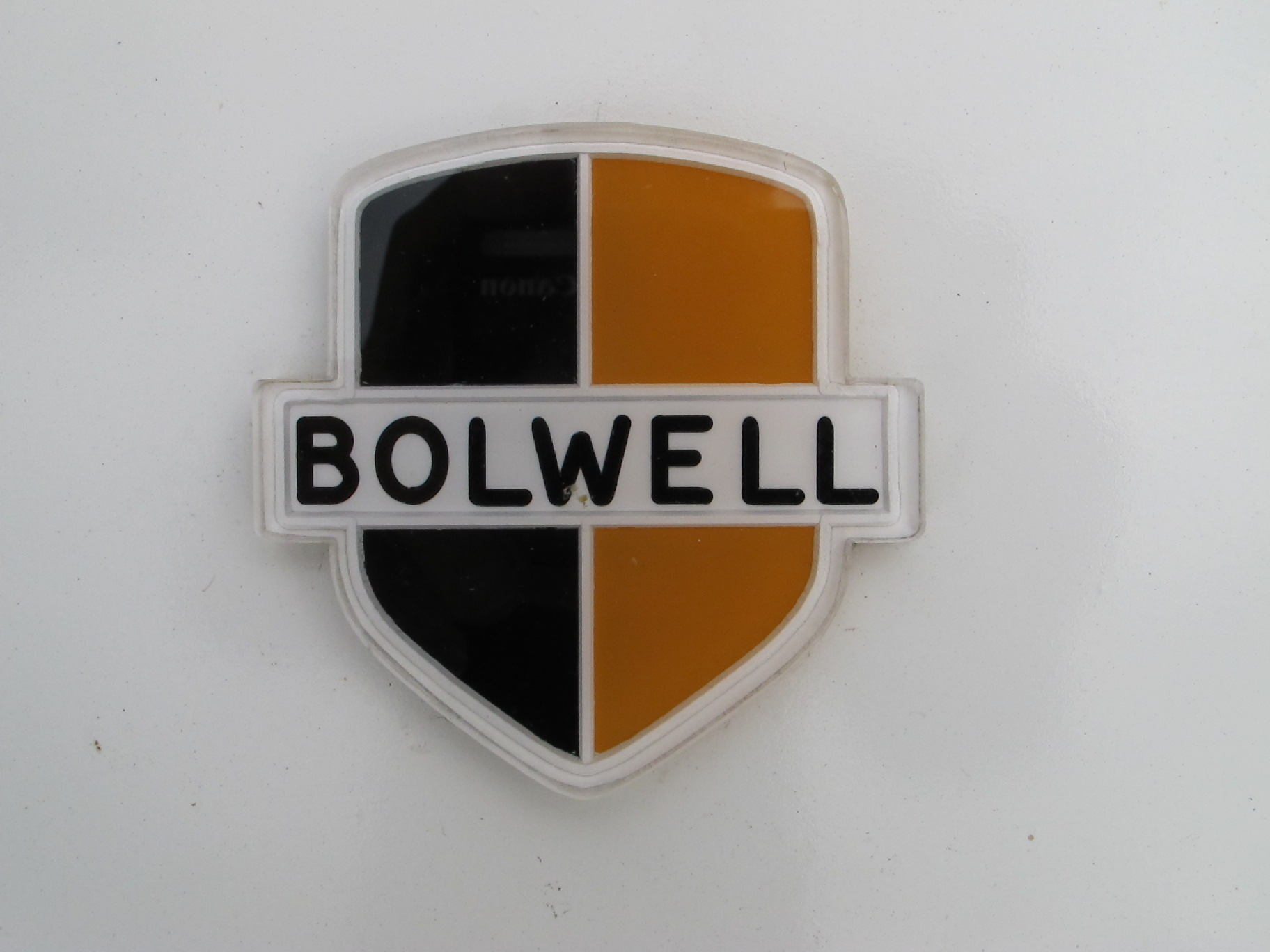

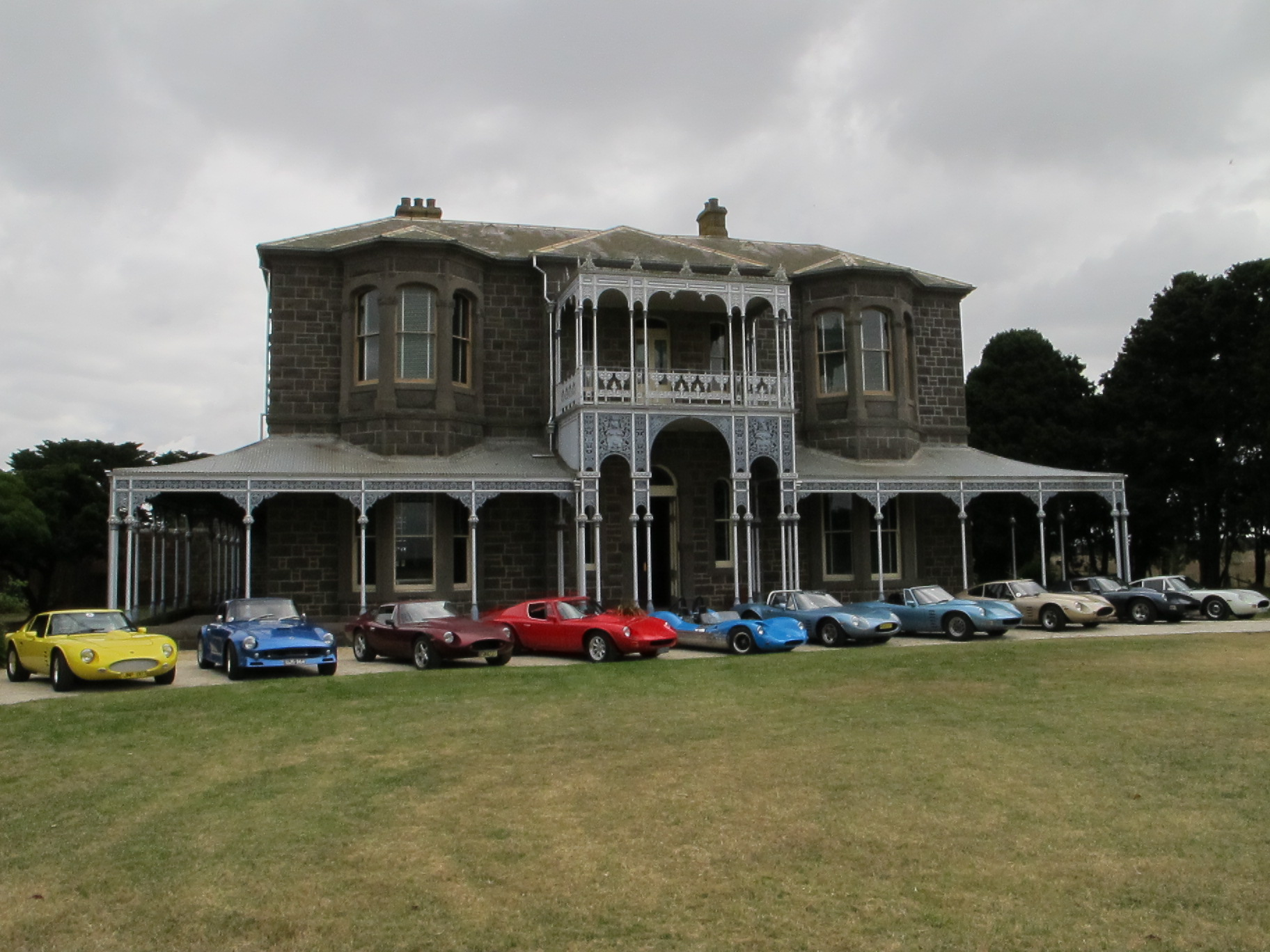
- Industry: automotive industry plastics industry
- Founded: 1962
- Defunct: 1979-2008
- Headquarters: Melbourne, Australia
- Key people: Vaughan Bolwell (CEO); Owen Bolwell (director)
- Products: Sports Cars
- Website: www.bolwelltechnologies.com

Bolwell Corporation Pty. Ltd. is a composite manufacturing company in Melbourne, Australia, specialising in fibreglass fabrication and lightweight structural components, which made Bolwell sports cars from 1962 to 1979. A new company of the same name began production of new cars in 2009 after several years of concept and show cars.

Bolwell Cars began as a manufacturer of fiberglass car bodies for other car companies in Australia, but quickly moved on to designing and producing their own cars. Over the years, Bolwell produced a number of different models, but none were as iconic as the Mk VIII Nagari.

Bolwell Cars created five commercial models and producing a total of 800 cars. Founder Campbell Bolwell remains active in designing and building cars, including the recent release of the Nagari 500 in 2019. The Nagari 500 features a carbon/Kevlar Tub, mid-mounted Chev LS3 V8 engine, and an Audi 6-speed transaxle. Bolwell, which is still a family company, has advanced manufacturing technologies and designs that have created opportunities both domestically and internationally, managed by Vaughan Bolwell.

== Models ==
=== Mk IV ===
The Mk IV was a kit car, offered as a coupe with gull wing doors and as an open sports car. Over 200 were produced between 1962 and 1964.

=== Mk V ===
75 Mk V coupes were produced between 1964 and 1966, using mostly Holden components.

=== Mk VI ===
The Mk VI, also known as the SR6, was a one off mid-engined sports racing car built in 1968.

=== Mk VII ===
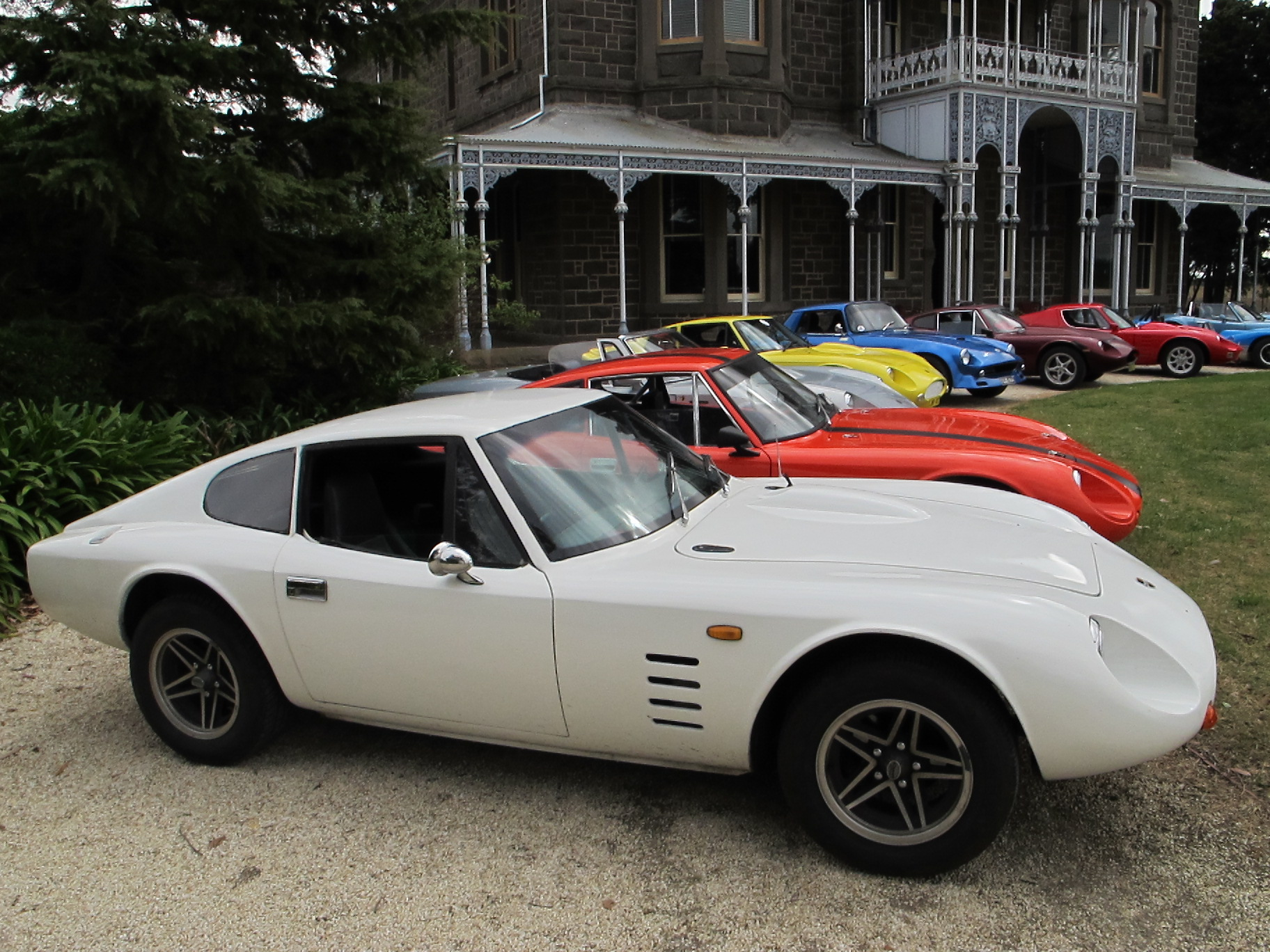
Bolwell Mk VII

400 examples of the MK VII coupe were produced between 1967 and 1971, mostly as kits but also in fully built form. Later kits from around 1969 onwards were built by Kadala Cars for Bolwell. Last version cars had Nagari Dash and gauges, Nagari Seats, Nagari pedal box and Nagari style rear suspension linkages.

=== Mk VIII Nagari ===
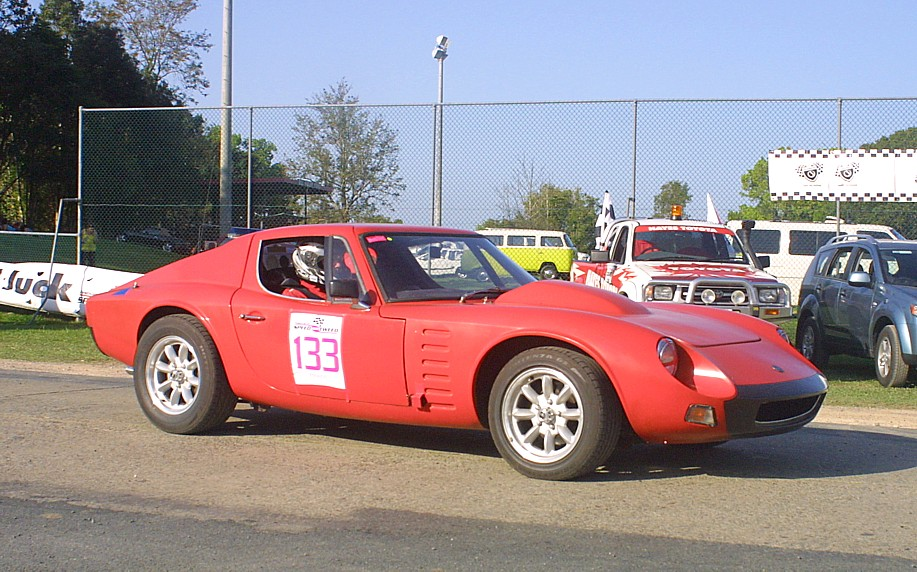
Bolwell Mk VIII Nagari

The Mk VIII, better known as the Bolwell Nagari, was a Ford V8 powered model, offered from 1970. Fully built in the Bolwell factory, it was initially offered in coupe form only, a convertible being available from 1972. Production ceased in 1974 with 100 coupes and 18 convertibles having been produced.

=== Mk IX Ikara ===
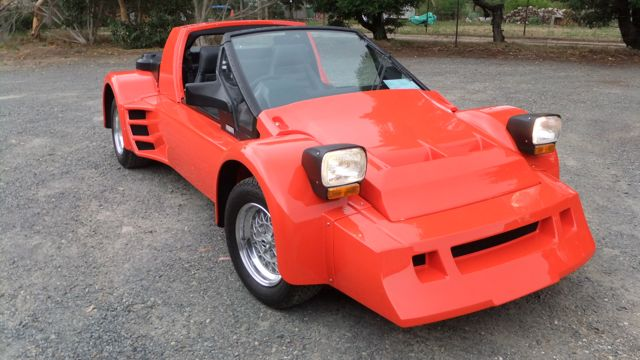
Bolwell Mk IX Ikara

The Mk IX Ikara, conceived in 1979, was a kit mid-engined sports car powered by a 1600cc Volkswagen Golf 4-cylinder engine. It utilized a space frame chassis and fiberglass body panels without doors. There were only 12 examples ever produced. Eleven of the vehicles survive, with one in need of restoration. Car #9 is missing.

=== Mk X Nagari ===
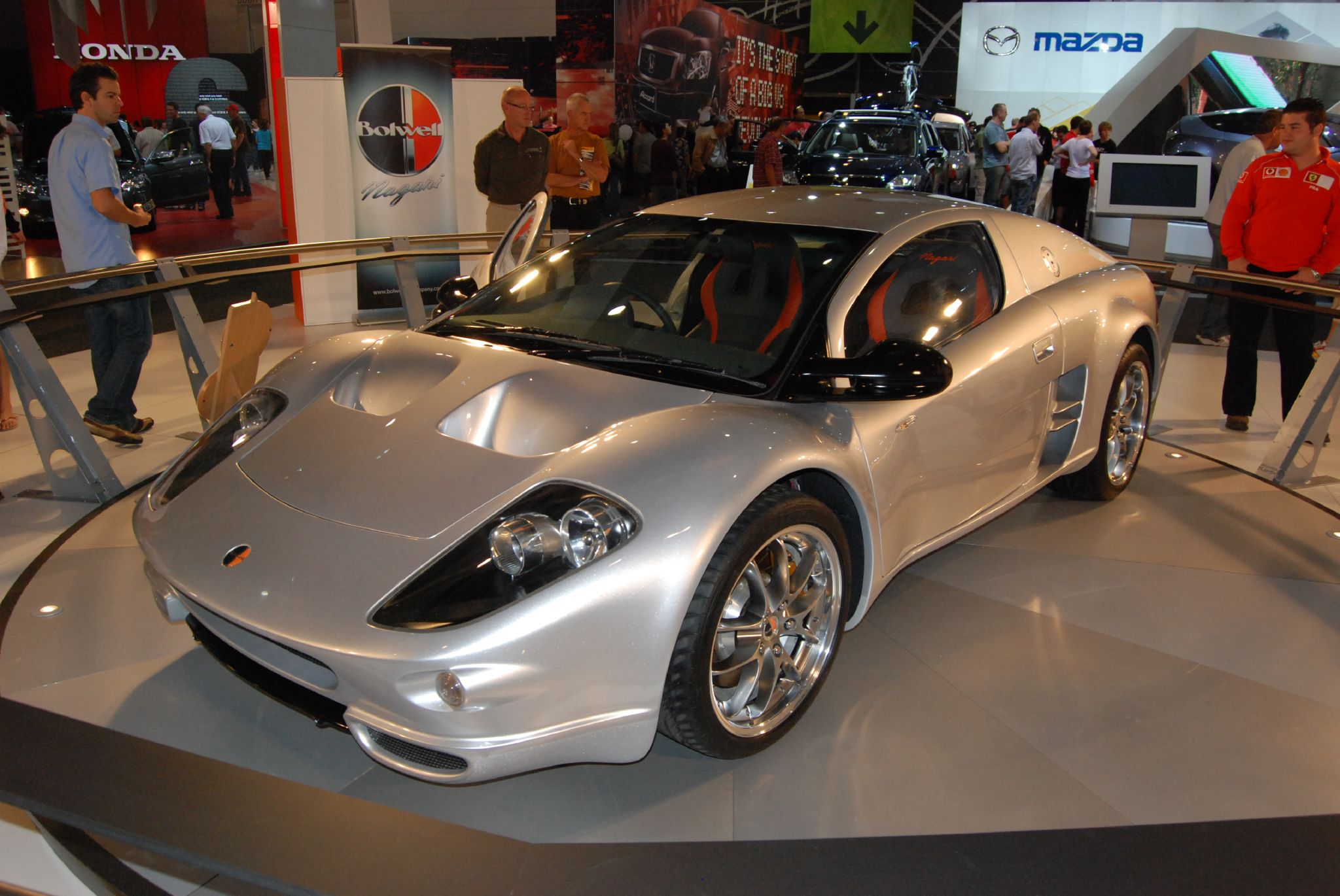
Bolwell Mk X Nagari.

A new Bolwell Nagari, the Mk X, was launched at the Melbourne Motor Show in March 2008. Production commenced in 2009.
