= Triumph GT6 =

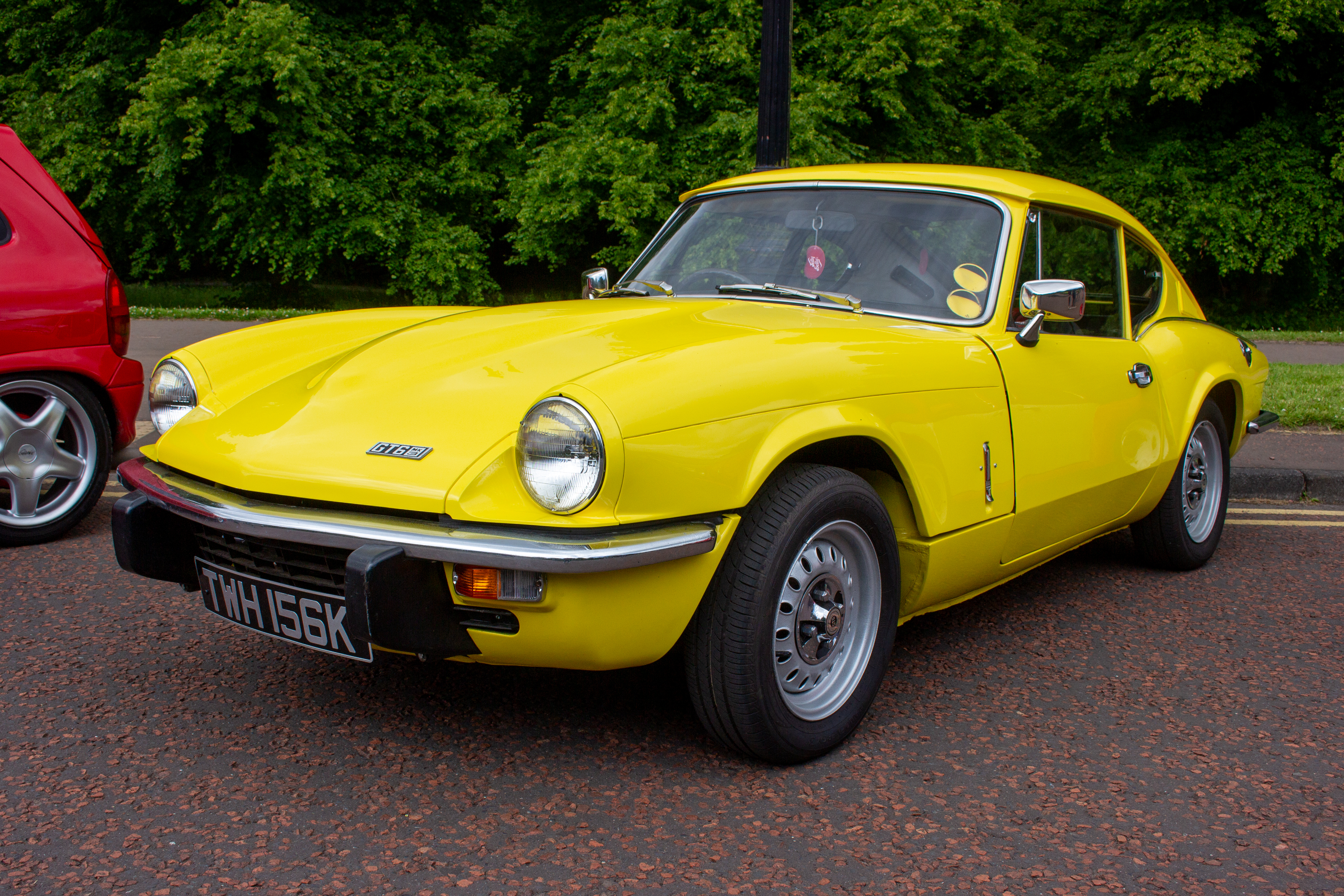
- 1971 Triumph GT6 Mk III

Overview
- Manufacturer: Standard-Triumph
- Production: 1966–1973
- Assembly: United Kingdom: Canley, Coventry
- Designer: Giovanni Michelotti

Body and chassis
- Class: Sports car
- Body style: 2-door fastback
- Layout: FR layout
- Related: Triumph Spitfire; Triumph Herald; Triumph Vitesse

Powertrain
- Engine: 1,996 cc (2.0 L) OHV I6
- Transmission: 4-speed synchromeshed manual with optional overdrive

Dimensions
- Wheelbase: 2,128 mm (83.8 in)
- Length: 3,717 mm (146.3 in) (Mk 1); 3,734 mm (147.0 in) (Mk 2/Plus); 3,785 mm (149.0 in) (Mk 3)
- Width: 1,450 mm (57 in) (Mk 1/2/Plus); 1,486 mm (58.5 in) (Mk 3)
- Height: 1,193 mm (47.0 in)

The Triumph GT6 is a 6-cylinder sports coupé built by Standard-Triumph, based on their popular Triumph Spitfire convertible. Production ran from 1966 to 1973.

== Development history ==
In early 1963, Giovanni Michelotti was commissioned by Standard-Triumph to design a GT version of their recently introduced Spitfire 4 (also designed by Michelotti). An unmodified Spitfire 4 was delivered to Michelotti's design studios in Italy, and late in 1963 the prototype Spitfire GT was returned to England for evaluation. The styling was a success, but the extra weight of the GT bodyshell resulted in extremely poor performance from the Spitfire's 1,147 cc (70 cu in) Standard SC engine, and plans to produce the Spitfire GT were shelved.

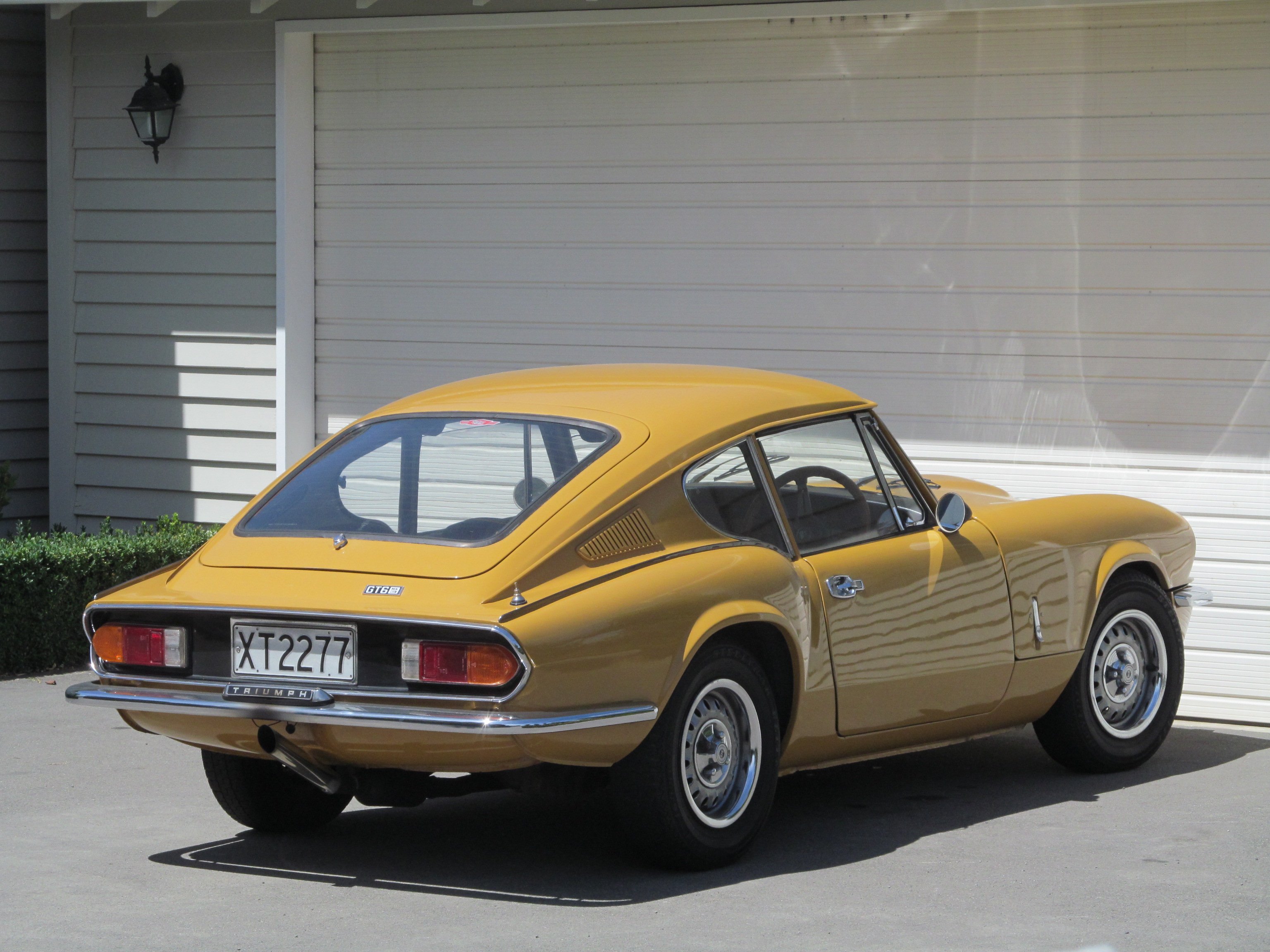
Triumph GT6 Mk III rear

Michelotti's fastback design for the Spitfire GT prototype was adopted by the Triumph racing programme for the 1964 season, as it was deemed to provide an aerodynamic benefit over the standard Spitfire body shape. Fibreglass copies of the Spitfire GT's fastback were grafted onto the race-modified Spitfires destined for competition. The Spitfire racing programme was successful, and in 1965 finished 13th overall and 1st in class at the prestigious 24 Hours of Le Mans (beating their main rivals, the MG Midgets). The Spitfire's competitive success and the production vehicle's continued commercial success led Triumph to re-evaluate its shelved plans for a GT version of the Spitfire. To overcome the lack of performance inherent in the heavier body style, the Spitfire's 4-cylinder engine was replaced with the more powerful 2.0 L (1,996 cc) Triumph inline 6 originally derived from the SC and then in use in the Triumph Vitesse (which shared a similar chassis with the Spitfire and Triumph Herald). The car was further developed and refined, and eventually launched as the Triumph GT6 (dropping the "Spitfire" prefix and adding the 6) to emphasise its GT styling and its 6-cylinder engine.

Contemporary Triumph marketing advertised the GT6 as being developed from the "race-winning Le Mans Spitfires" to capitalise on their aesthetic similarities, whereas the Le Mans Spitfires and the GT6 were actually two entirely separate development programmes (the GT programme pre-dating the racing programme). However, the marketing spin was so successful that many people erroneously believed the Le Mans Spitfires to actually be GT6s.

== Models ==
The following models were produced during the production run:

Model name	Engine	Year	Number built
GT6 Mark I	1996 cc inline 6	July 1966 – Sept 1968	15,818
GT6 Mark II	1996 cc inline 6	July 1968 – Dec 1970	12,066
GT6 Mark III	1996 cc inline 6	Oct 1970 – Dec 1973	13,042

Production Total (all models): 40,926

== GT6 Mk I ==
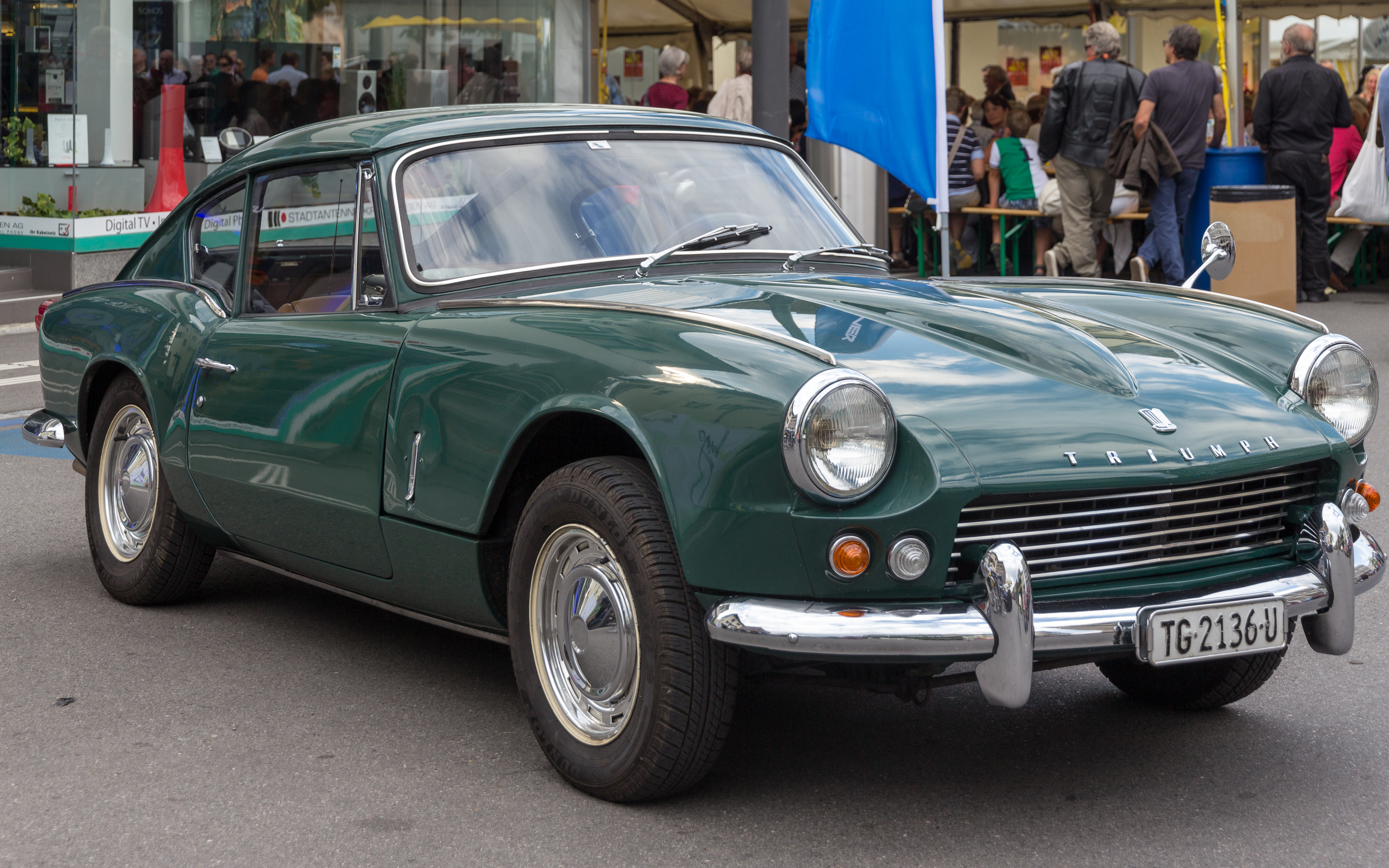
Triumph GT6 Mk I

The new car was introduced in 1966 and called the Triumph GT6. The new body was a sleek fastback design with an opening rear hatch, earning the GT6 the nickname of poor man's E-Type. It was really a 2-seater, but a small extra rear seat could be ordered, large enough for small children. The family resemblance to the Spitfire Mk II was strong, the longer 6-cylinder engine necessitated a new bonnet top with a power bulge and the doors were provided with opening quarter light windows and squared-off glass in the top rear corner. The 6-cylinder engine was, like the Vitesse 2 litre, tuned to develop 95 hp (71 kW) at 5000 rpm, and produced 117 lb⋅ft (159 N⋅m) of torque at 3000 rpm. The increased power necessitated certain changes to the Spitfire mechanics; the radiator was new and mounted further forward in the car and the gearbox was the stronger unit from the Vitesse 2 litre, with synchromesh on all 4 forward gears. An optional Laycock de Normanville overdrive was offered giving a 20 per cent overdrive on 3rd and 4th gears. In effect this added only one ratio as overdrive 3rd was identical to 4th without overdrive. The overall gearing of overdrive and non-overdrive cars was not different as the non o/d cars came with a 3.27:1 differential while the overdrive cars' diffs were the same as the Vitesse 2 litre at 3.89:1. Front springs were uprated to cope with the extra weight of the new engine. The overall vehicle weight unladen was 1,904 lb (864 kg). The interior of the GT6 features a wooden dashboard housing a full complement of instruments, with carpets and heater included as standard.

The new car's engine provided a 106 mph (171 km/h) top speed and 0–60 mph (0–97 km/h) in just under 12 seconds, a little better than the MGB GT. Moreover, the unit was comparatively smooth and tractable, in contrast to the MG's four cylinder BMC B-series engine, which produced almost the same power in twin carburettor form, but at higher revs. Fuel economy was very reasonable for the period at 20 mpg_{‑imp} (14 L/100 km; 17 mpg_{‑US}), and the interior well up to the competition. The only major criticism was of its rear suspension; the GT6 inherited the swing-axle system from the Spitfire, which in turn was copied from the Herald small saloon. In the saloon it was tolerated, in the little Spitfire it was not liked and in the powerful GT6 it was heavily criticised. Triumph had done nothing to improve the system for the GT6 and the tendency to break away if the driver lifted off the power mid-corner was not helped at all by the increased weight at the front of the car. The handling was most bitterly criticised in the US, an important export market for Triumph, where they were traditionally very strong. Similar criticism was being levelled at the Vitesse saloon, which shared the GT6's engine and its handling problems.

== GT6 Mk II (GT6+) ==
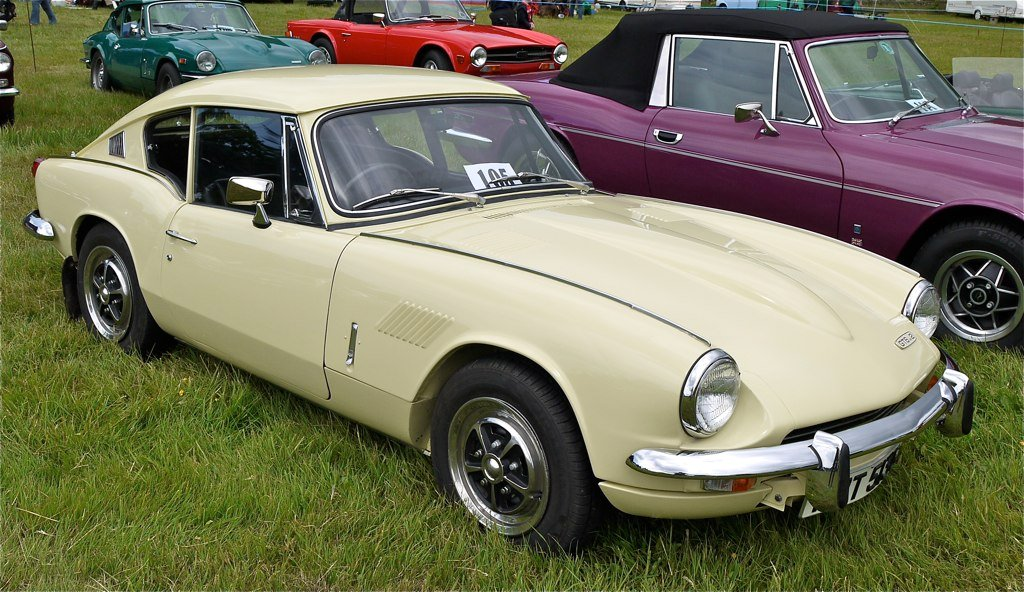
Triumph GT6 Mk II

Triumph realised that they needed to find an answer to the handling problem, if only to maintain their reputation in the U.S. Their response came with the 1969 model year, with the introduction of the GT6 Mk II, branded in North America as the GT6+. The rear suspension was significantly re-engineered using reversed lower wishbones and Rotoflex driveshaft couplings, taming the handling and turning the Triumph into an MGB beater. The Vitesse was also modified, but the Spitfire had to wait until the 1971 Mk IV for any improvements.

There were other changes for the Mk II: the front bumper was raised (as on the Spitfire Mk 3) to comply with new crash regulations, necessitating a revised front end, and side vents were added to the front wings and rear pillars. Under the bonnet, the engine was the uprated Vitesse MkII unit developing 104 hp (78 kW) with a new cylinder head, camshaft, and manifolds. The major changes were altered valve timing and larger inlet valves, with an increase to the width of the head. Performance improved slightly to 107 mph (172 km/h), but perhaps more noteworthy the 0–60 mph (0–97 km/h) time dropped to 10 seconds. The fuel economy was also improved to 25 mpg_{‑imp} (11 L/100 km; 21 mpg_{‑US}) average.

Overdrive remained a popular option for the manual transmission with the same specifications as the Mk I. Braking was updated to a dual circuit system with tandem master cylinder and emission systems began to appear in markets that mandated them. The early emission systems consisted of a diaphragm type EGR valve, carbon canister and evaporation lines and were used on other cars of the period. The fuel cap was changed to a self-sealing magnetic design.

The interior was updated with a new 'non-reflective' 'anti-dazzle' walnut finish dashboard and gauges with 'black rimmed instruments'. Gone were the chrome toggle switches that festooned earlier models, having been replaced with smart non-reflective black rocker switches in keeping with the anti-glare theme. Headliners and matching sun visors were shipped in black and white, with white being the dominant colour in North America presumably an attempt to tame the beastly interior heat found in North American cars. Better interior ventilation was provided via flow-thru vents in the rear pillars in addition to a two-speed blower. Interior window cranks and door levers were changed and shared with the TR6 model. Tops of interior doors were covered with foam backed vinyl trim. US Market cars also received high back reclining bucket seats.

The rear reversing/number plate lamp fixture for 1970 was borrowed from the E-Type Jaguar, further cementing the E-Type associations. No doubt a consideration by Triumph to play it up. "The 'plus' is easily identified by the newly designed enamelled badges asymmetrically placed at the rear and on the hood." Rear tinted glass with integrated heating element was also equipped.

Optional extras available for 1970 included safety hex-hub, centre locking, 60 spoke double laced wire wheels with each spoke "hand torqued to Triumph specifications". Racing mag or aluminium wheels, custom chrome plated steel roof rack, bumper guards, space for under dash radio were also listed.

== GT6 Mk III ==
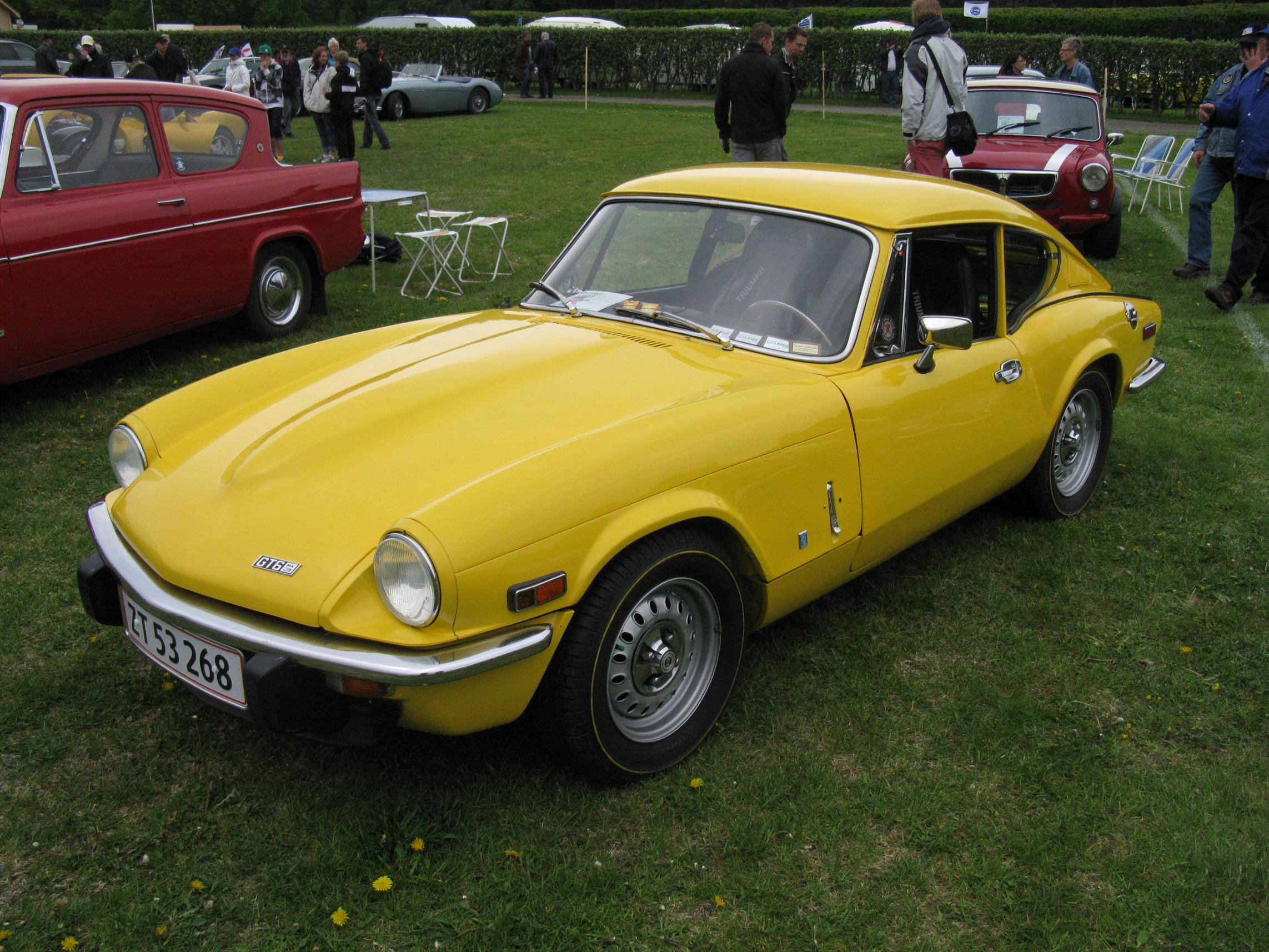
Triumph GT6 Mk III

The final major facelift for the GT6 came in 1970 in the form of the Mk III. This time the entire bodyshell was revised to match the changes made to the Spitfire Mk IV: modifications included a cut-off rear end, recessed door handles and a smoother front end. Only detail changes were made to the mechanics, but in 1973 – close to the end of the car's production life – the rear suspension was changed again, this time for the cheaper (but still effective) "swing-spring" layout fitted to the Spitfire Mk IV. This was a modification of the swing axle rear suspension used on the Herald-derived models, with the transverse leaf spring mounted on a pivot, eliminating roll stiffness at the rear, and thus greatly reducing the jacking effect under cornering loads. To compensate for this loss of roll stiffness, a larger front anti-roll bar was fitted. A brake servo was also added in 1973, and seats were changed from vinyl to cloth. There was still a fairly comprehensive options list, but the knock-on wire wheels were no longer available. The unladen weight increased slightly to 2,030 lb (920 kg).

Engine power and torque for the Mk III was similar to the Mk II, but better aerodynamics led to a new top speed of 112 mph (180 km/h) and a 0–60 mph (0–97 km/h) time of 10.1 seconds. Performance was now comfortably ahead of the MGB GT, which reached about 105 mph (169 km/h) and 0–60 mph (0–97 km/h) in approximately 13 seconds. Fuel economy was also improved to 28 mpg_{‑imp} (10 L/100 km; 23 mpg_{‑US}). The last USA models performed relatively poorly, owing to the compression ratios being reduced to allow the use of lower octane unleaded petrol.

The Mk III never sold in the numbers hoped for by Triumph, and was comprehensively beaten in the marketplace by the MGB. Triumph refused to release an official convertible version of the GT6 and, after poor sales, it was dropped from the Triumph range at the end of 1973, although a few cars were sold the following year.
