= Bolwell Nagari =

The Bolwell Nagari is a sports car produced by Bolwell in Australia. The original Mk VIII Nagari was built from 1970 to 1974 and the Mk X Nagari was launched in 2008.

== Mk VIII Nagari ==
Bolwell Mk VIII Nagari
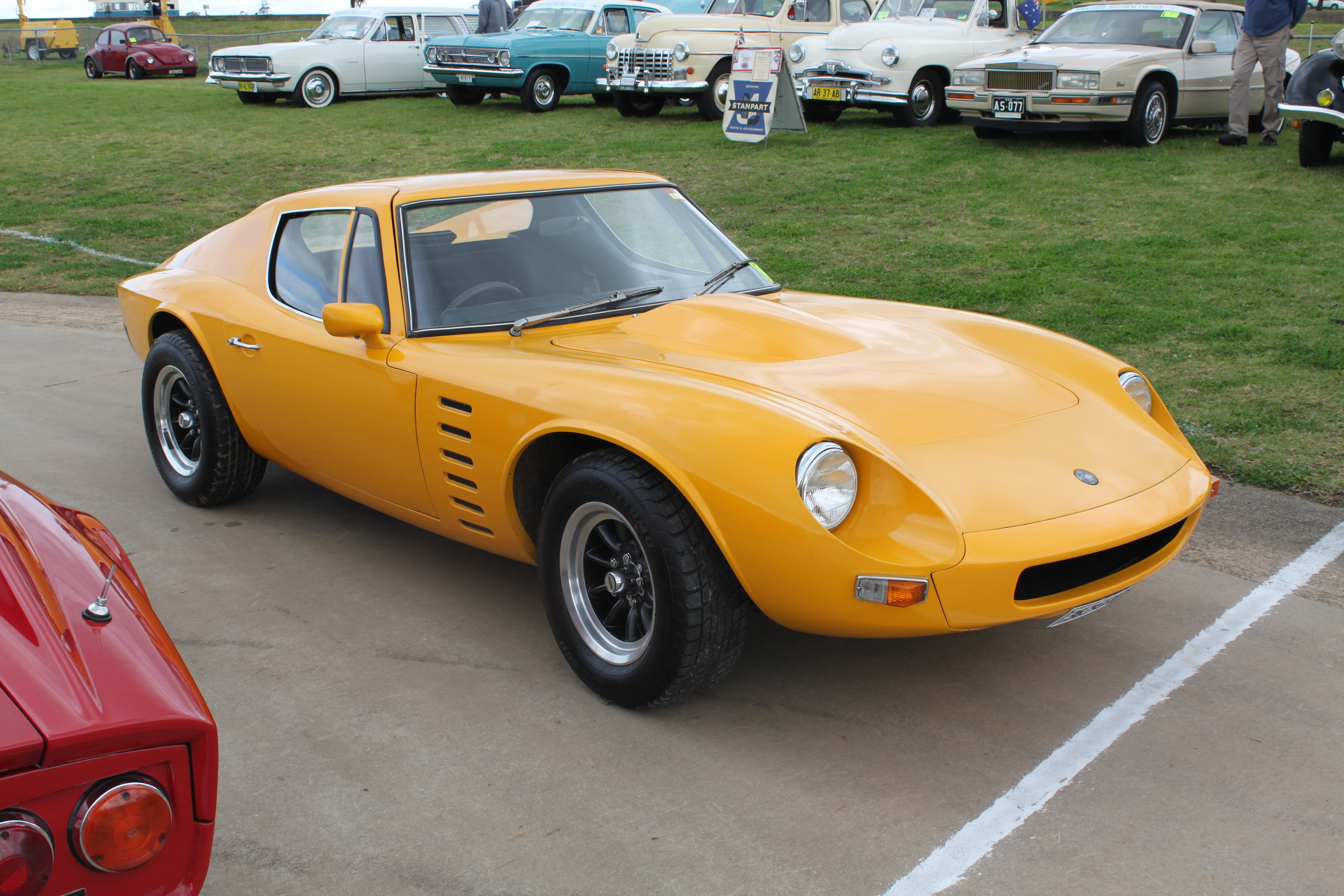
- Bolwell Mk VIII Nagari Coupe

Overview
- Manufacturer: Bolwell
- Production: 1970 to 1974
- Assembly: Mordialloc, Victoria

Body and chassis
- Class: Sports car
- Body style: 2-door coupé 2-door Sports - roadster
- Layout: FR layout

Powertrain
- Engine: 5.0L Ford Windsor 302 V8; 5.8L Ford Cleveland 302 & 351 V8
- Transmission: 4-speed manual

Dimensions
- Wheelbase: 2,350 mm (92.5 in)
- Length: 4,013 mm (158.0 in)
- Width: 1,676 mm (66.0 in)
- Height: 1,118 mm (44.0 in)
- Curb weight: 927 kg (2,044 lb) (coupé) 1,038 kg (2,288 lb) (roadster)

Chronology
- Predecessor: Bolwell Mk VII

Nagari is an aboriginal word meaning "flowing," and the Bolwell Nagari, also known as the Mk VIII, was the company's first full production sports car with 100 coupes and 18 Sports (roadster) made. It was manufactured from 1970 to 1974 and became the best known out of the 9 Bolwell car designs: the Mk I-VIII and Ikara. The Nagari featured a Ford 302 or 351 cubic inch V8 engine mounted in a 920 kg (2,028 lb), 2,280 mm (89.8 in) wheelbase body and backbone chassis. Other components came from Ford (suspension and dampers) and Austin 1800 (steering).

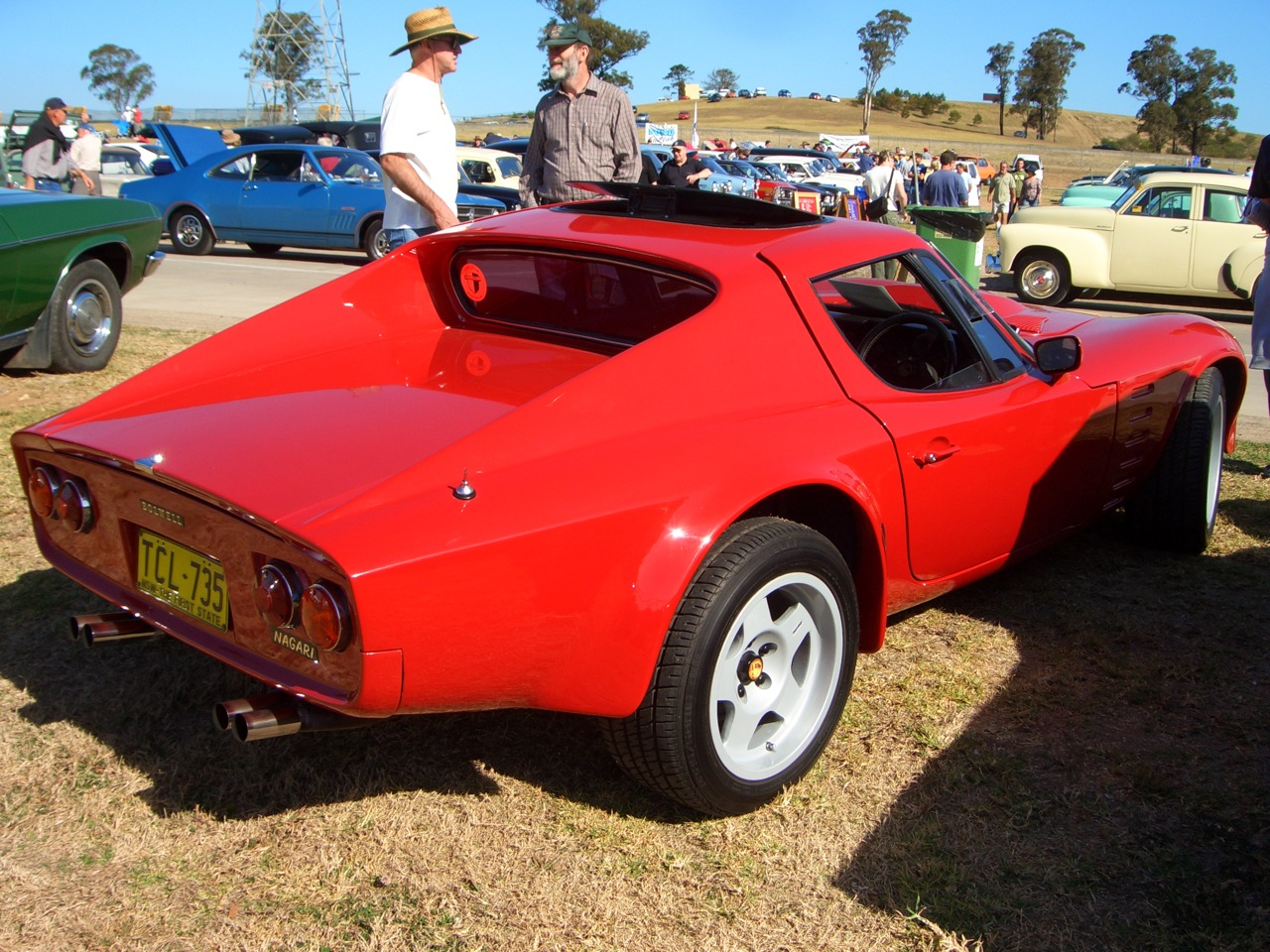
Mk VIII Nagari Coupe rear.

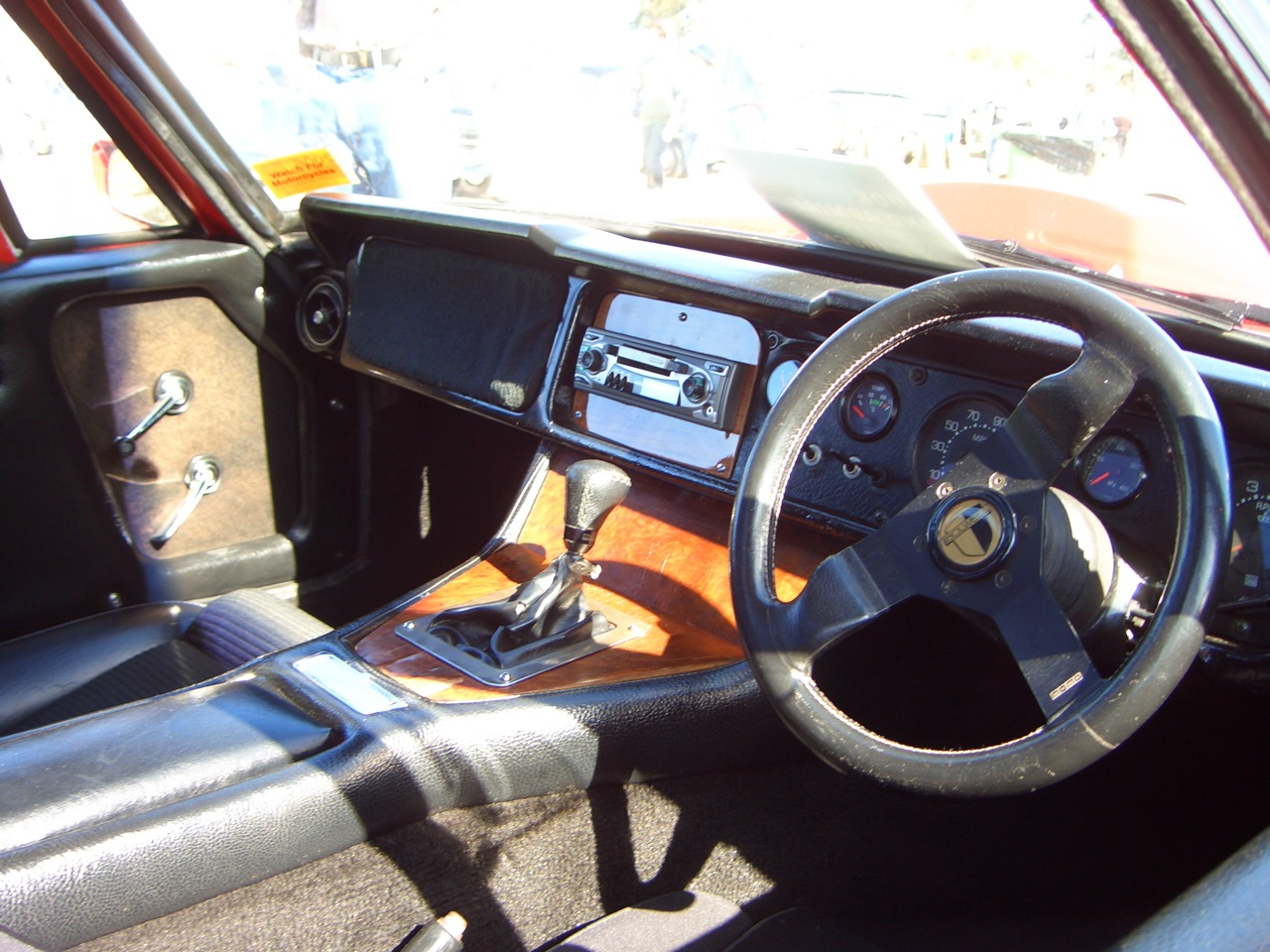
Mk VIII Nagari interior.

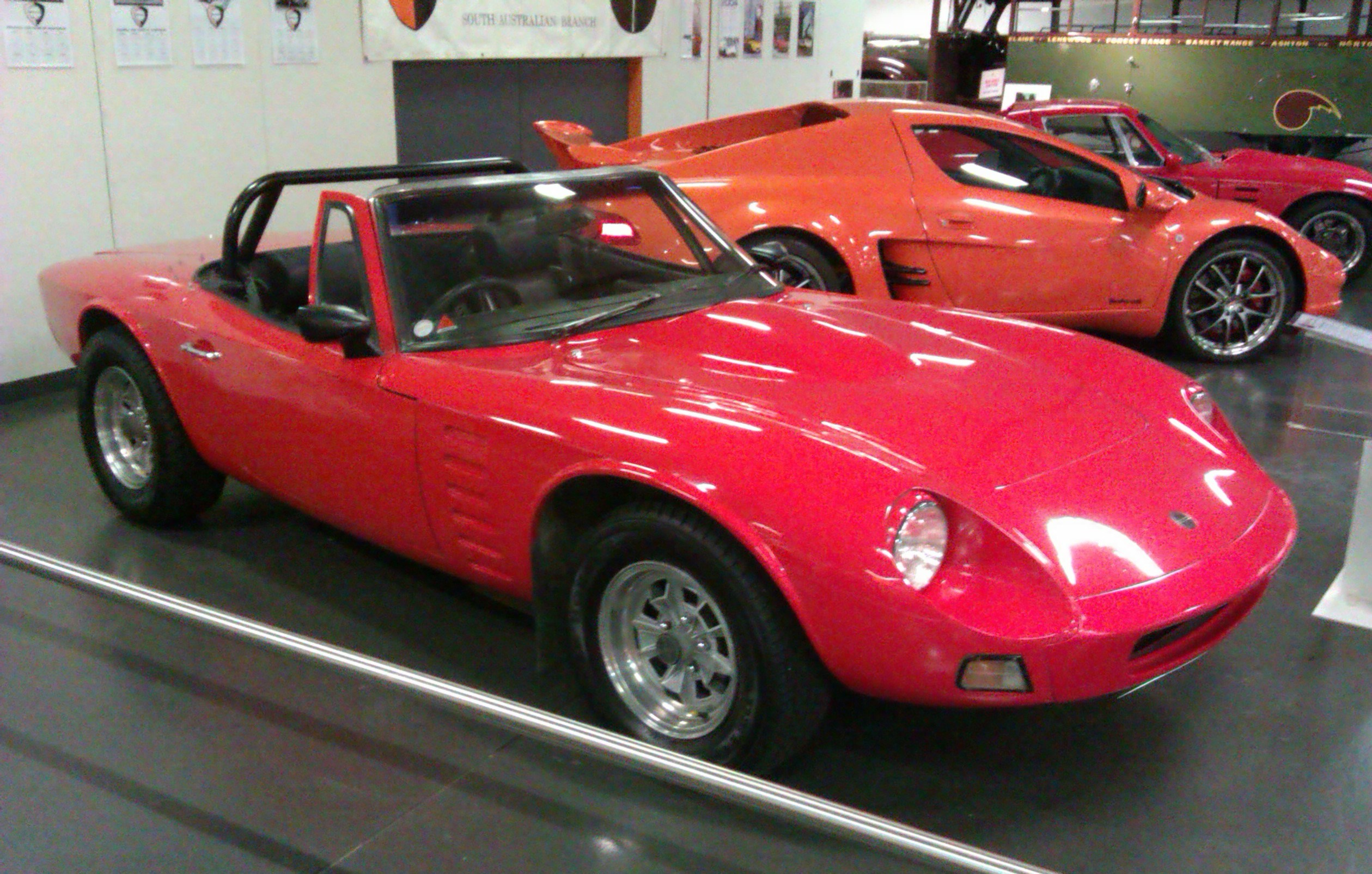
Mk VIII Nagari Sports.

=== Motorsport ===
The Nagari was a popular choice of production sports car in the early ‘70s, competing in the Australian Sports Car Championship (ASCC). Peter Warren won the 1975 Australian Tourist Trophy for Production Sports Cars driving a Bolwell Nagari.

== Mk X Nagari ==
Bolwell Mk X Nagari
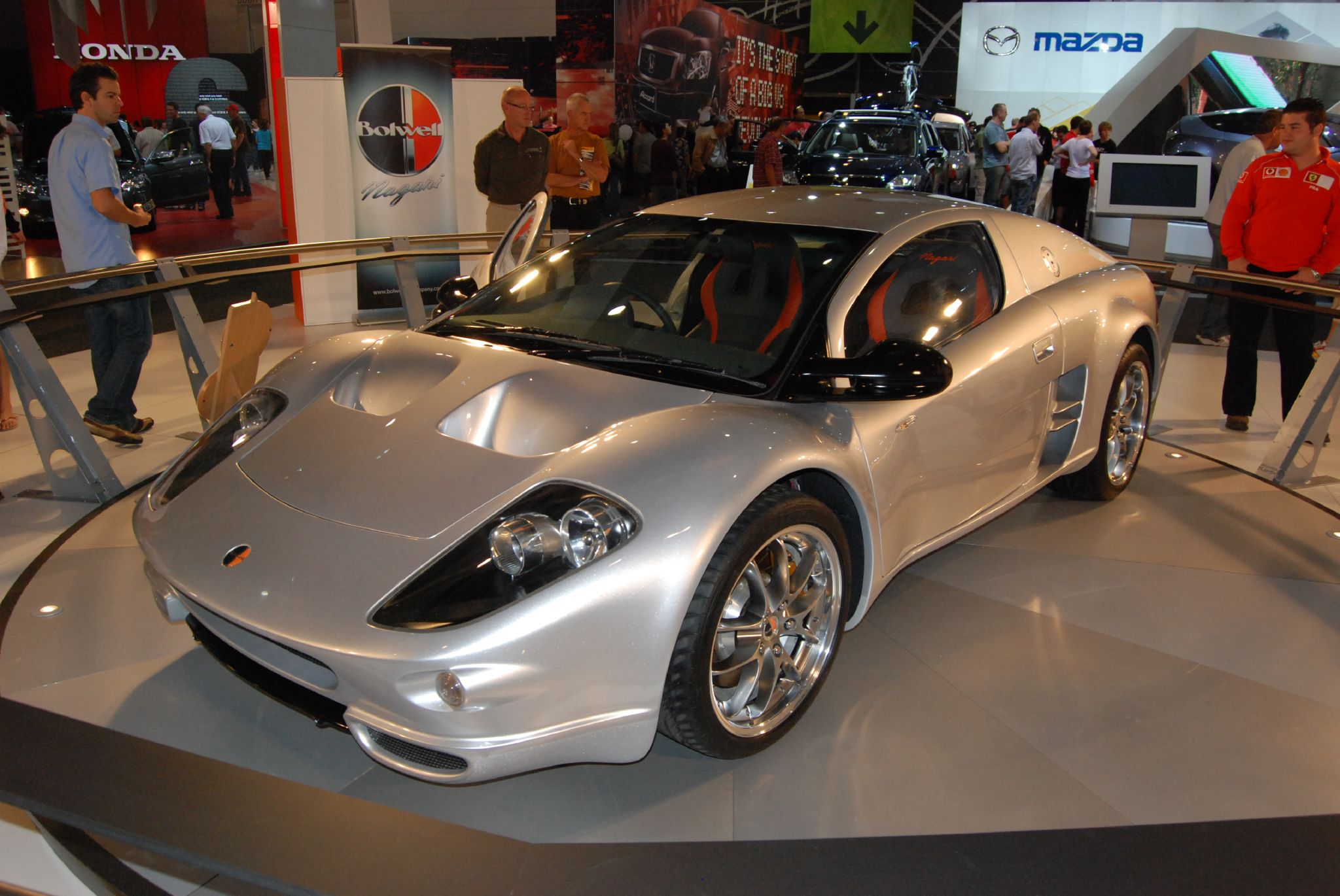
- Bolwell Mk X Nagari

Overview
- Manufacturer: Bolwell
- Also called: Bolwell Nagari 300; Bolwell Nagari 500
- Production: 2009 to present
- Assembly: Seaford, Victoria

Body and chassis
- Class: Sports car
- Body style: 2-door coupé
- Layout: MR layout

Powertrain
- Engine: 3.5L 2GR-FE V6 (Nagari 300); 3.5L 2GR-FE V6-S; 6.2L LS3 V8 (Nagari 500)
- Transmission: 6-speed manual 6-speed automatic

Dimensions
- Wheelbase: 2,350 mm (92.5 in)
- Length: 4,100 mm (161.4 in)
- Width: 1,830 mm (72.0 in)
- Height: 1,175 mm (46.3 in)
- Curb weight: 920–990 kg (2,028–2,183 lb)

Chronology
- Predecessor: Bolwell IKARA

In late 2006 it was announced that the Bolwell company intended to produce a new, carbon fibre-bodied car under the 'Nagari' name and the model was confirmed for production in 2008. The prototype debuted at the 2008 Melbourne International Motor Show and the 2008 Sydney International Motor Show. It is a mid-engined two-seater coupé with a carbon-fibre tub, front and rear subframes and a carbon-reinforced composite body. Power comes from a fettled 2GR-FE 3.5L V6 engine sourced from the Toyota Aurion, which is available either as naturally aspirated or fitted with an optional Sprintex supercharger. In N/A form the 2GR-FE produces 200–221 kW (268–296 hp) at 6200 rpm, with 336–353 N⋅m (248–260 lb⋅ft) of torque at 4700rpm. Initially the Nagari was available with only a 6-speed automatic (with or without paddle shifting), however a 6-speed manual transmission was later developed. DC5-model Honda Integra tail-lights are used in the exterior. Standard features are limited, with prices starting around $150,000 AUD for a basic model, and can range up to $260,000 for a top-spec model with the supercharged engine and manual transmission.

To celebrate the 50th anniversary of the original Mk VIII Nagari, Bolwell released a Mk X Nagari 500, powered by an LS3 6.2L V8 engine sourced from the Chevrolet Corvette Z06 producing 500 hp (370 kW) at 6600 rpm, with 425 lb⋅ft (576 N⋅m) of torque at 4600 rpm.

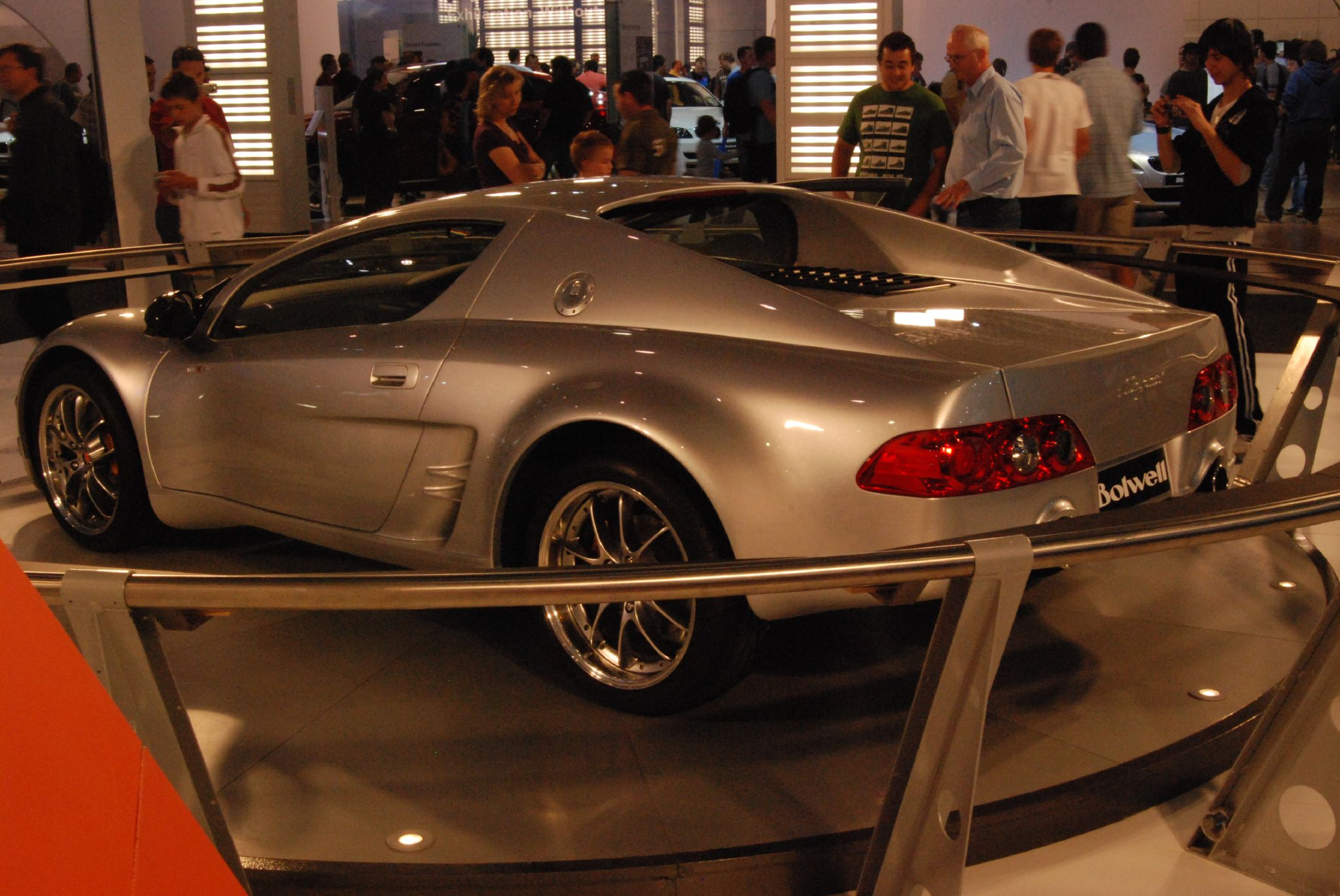
Mk X Nagari rear.

Mk X Nagari interior.
