= Lotus Europa =

Two automobiles by Lotus

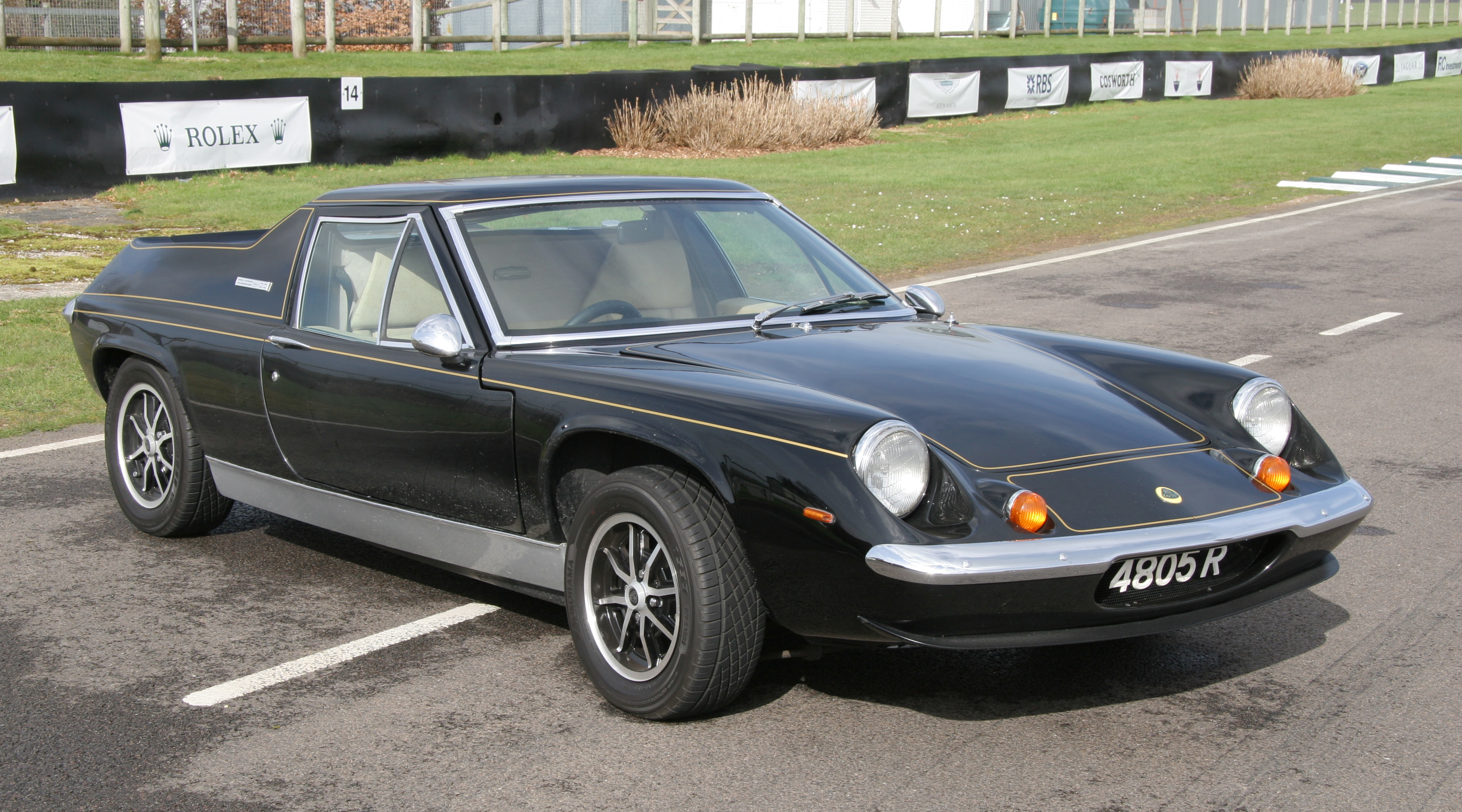
- 1972 Lotus Europa Special

Overview
- Manufacturer: Lotus Cars
- Production: 1966–1975; 2006–2010
- Assembly: United Kingdom: Hethel, Norfolk, England
- Designer: Ron Hickman; Russell Carr (Europa S)

Body and chassis
- Class: Sports car (S)
- Body style: 2-door coupe
- Layout: Longitudinal, Rear mid-engine, rear-wheel drive

Powertrain
- Engine: 1,470 cc (1.5 L) Renault A1K I4; 1,558 cc (1.6 L) Lotus-Ford Twin Cam I4; 1,565 cc (1.6 L) Renault 807 I4
- Transmission: 4-speed manual; 5-speed manual

Dimensions
- Wheelbase: 2,337 mm (92 in)
- Length: 4,064 mm (160 in)
- Width: 1,714 mm (67.5 in)
- Height: 1,080 mm (42.5 in)
- Kerb weight: 610 to 710 kg (1,350 to 1,570 lb)

Chronology
- Successor: Lotus Esprit (Europa only)

The Lotus Europa name is used on two distinct mid-engine GT cars built by British automobile manufacturer Lotus Cars. The original Europa and its variants comprise the Lotus Types 46, 47, 54, 65 and 74, and were produced between 1966 and 1975.

The name was later revived in the Type 121 Europa S, a sports car based on the Lotus Elise produced from 2006 to 2010.

== Europa (1966–1975) ==
The rear mid-engine vehicle configuration, used by Porsche in the very first 356/1 and since 1953 in the Porsche 550 and later 718, 904, 906 2-seater sports cars that were also road legal, was well-established as the optimal design for Grand Prix cars since the late 1950s. Even Ferrari used it to win the 1961 F1, and in the 1963 24 Hours of Le Mans the 250 P has beaten its front engined 250 GTO siblings, marking the begin of dominance even in V12 engine sportscars.

However almost no road vehicles yet used the mid-engine arrangement, while many models sold by the millions offered additional rear seats and more usability just by moving the engine even further behind, as rear engine. Anyway, the rear-mid-engine road cars started in 1962 with the tiny Matra Djet, followed in 1963 by the V8-powered ATS 2500 GT, and others. Lotus was rather late in 1966, but planned the Europa to be a volume-produced, two-seater mid-engine sports coupe built to reasonable cost, quite an ambitious goal for the time. Like all Lotus vehicles of the era, the Europa was designed and built following Colin Chapman's oft-stated philosophy of automotive design: "Simplify, then add lightness". To this end, a number of ingenious design approaches were made by Lotus to allow it to economically overcome the many challenges presented by the novel mid-engine arrangement.

Production of the original Lotus Europa ceased in 1975, with a total of 9,230 cars of all models having been built.

=== Design features ===
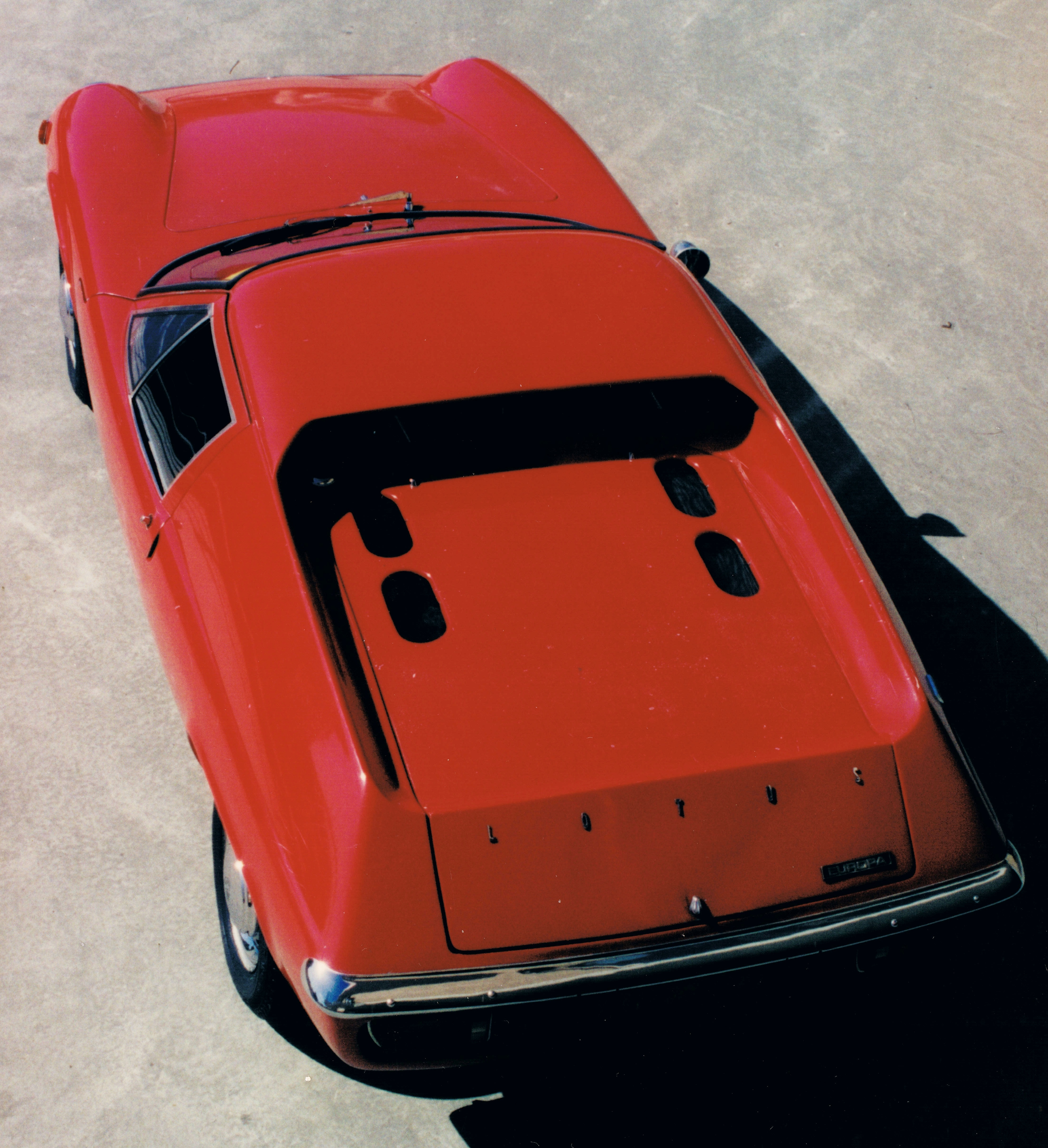
Lotus Europa S2 from above (1968 model)

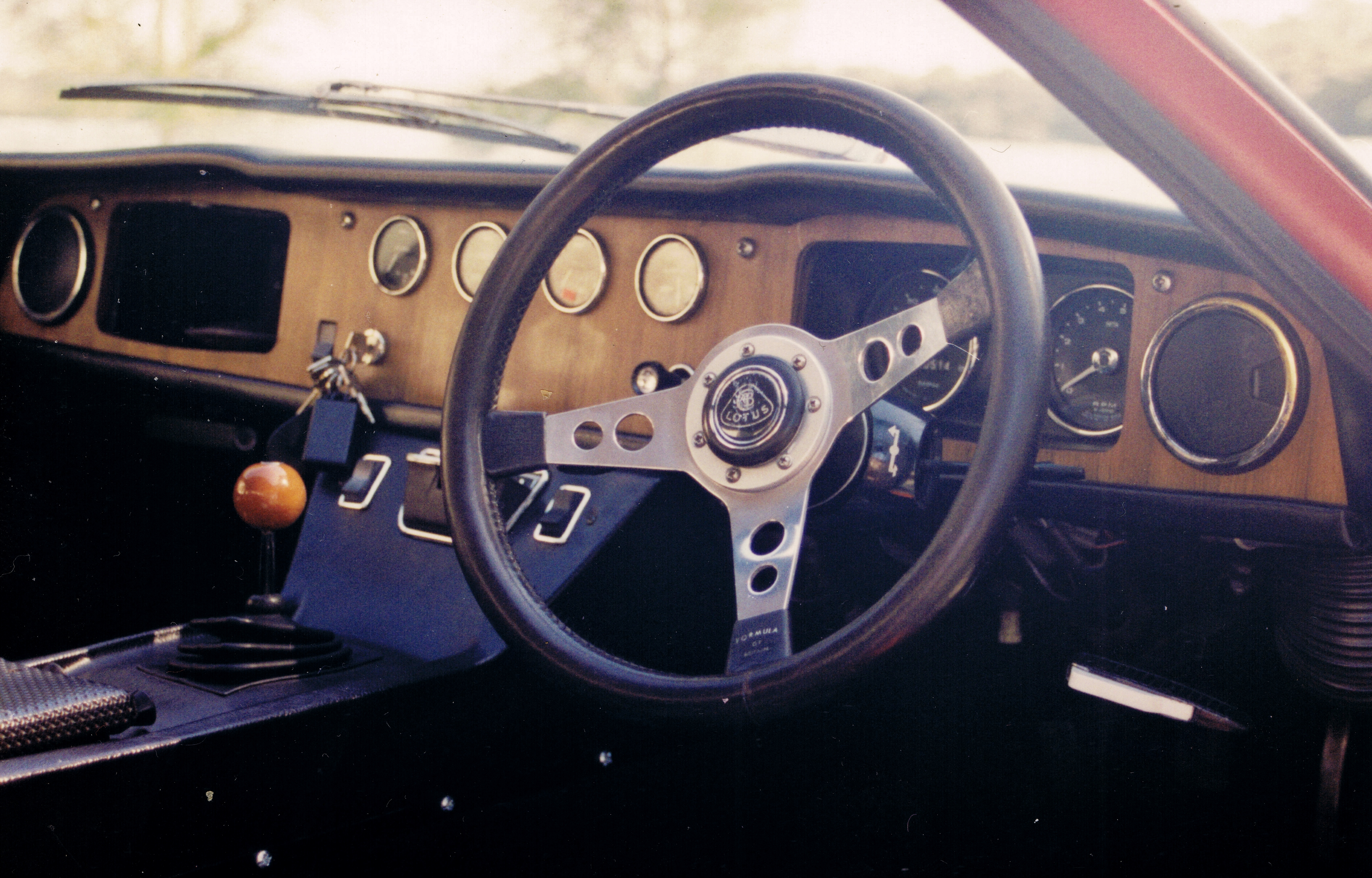
Interior (1968 black-badge model)

The Europa used a lightweight, folded and welded "minimalist" boxed-steel backbone chassis with a fibreglass moulded body, a combination that was first used by Lotus founder Colin Chapman in the Lotus Elan launched in 1962. Earliest versions of the Europa had the body fully bonded to the chassis for maximum structural stiffness, however this was soon changed to a bolted-on body to allow normal chassis and body repairs to be made. Unlike the Elan, the Europa had no front-mounted engine or gearbox to accommodate, and so the Europa's main chassis member ran straight forward to intersect a large box-section cross-beam running across the car between the front suspension points. At the rear, the chassis split into a "U" shape behind the cabin to accommodate the combined engine, transmission and final-drive components, and to support the rear suspension.

==== Engine and transaxle ====
The sourcing of suitable engine, gearbox and final-drive components was considered critical to the success of delivering a low-cost mid-engine vehicle. Chapman was keen to diversify beyond the Ford components heavily used in earlier Lotus vehicles, and settled on using the engine and combined transmission/final-drive transaxle units recently released by Renault for its 16. The 1,470 cc (1.5 L) Renault engine was a light and modern design, while the matching Renault 16 transaxle seemed almost ideal for the Europa project. In the Renault, the transaxle sat ahead of the engine, driving the front wheels. By relocating the combined engine/transaxle unit to the rear of the car and rotating it 180 degrees in plan, Lotus could obtain a ready-made modern mid-engine configuration - albeit one with four reverse gears. By repositioning the differential crownwheel within the final drive assembly (made possible by the symmetrical split case), the direction of rotation of the output shafts was reversed, thus correcting this shortcoming.

The Renault 16 engine's design met Lotus's requirements. It used an aluminium block with cast-iron cylinder liners, which saved appreciable weight compared to the cast-iron blocks more common at the time. Its overhead-valve design had the camshaft located high-up in the block, resulting in a compact valve-train well suited for high-rpm operation. Most importantly, all the engine ancillaries (water pump, belt-drives, alternator) were driven off a v-belt pulley fixed to the transaxle end of the camshaft instead of being driven by the engine's crankshaft. When fitted to the Europa, this pulley location put all the engine's ancillaries at its rear face giving easy access for maintenance, rather than them being located against the vehicle's bulkhead as for most conventional engines.

For Lotus's use, the Renault engine was given a number of key improvements, including a higher compression ratio (10.25 instead of 8.6), larger inlet valves, revised valve timings, dual valve springs and a twin-barrel carburettor. These changes lifted the engine's power by 23% from 63 hp (47 kW) at 5,000 rpm to 82 hp (61 kW) at 6,000 rpm. For US export, a de-tuned 1,565 cc (1.6 L) version with a maximum output of 80 hp (60 kW) at 6,000 rpm was fitted.

Later, Europa models were fitted with the same Ford-based Lotus TwinCam engine used in the Elan range since 1962. This was a sophisticated, twin-overhead-cam, 8-valve high-performance engine rated at 105 hp (78 kW) in original (Euro) specification (later uprated to 126 hp (94 kW) in "big-valve" form). It was reported that Lotus initially delayed its introduction in the Europa until they were confident in the strength of the Renault transaxle. The twin-cam engine first appeared in the Europa engine bay in mid-1971 (in Europe) and early 1972 (in North America). In North America, both the (early) 1972 Twin Cam version and (late) 1972–1974 Twin Cam "Special" versions were rated at 113 hp (84 kW) in Federalized Form.

When Renault introduced its most powerful 16 TX model in 1973, it included a strengthened five-speed transmission. Lotus quickly offered this gearbox as an option in the Europa, along with the big valve twin-cam engine.

==== Suspension ====
The Europa's four-wheel independent suspension was also typical Chapman thinking. The front used lightweight pressed steel upper and lower wishbones with a clever coil-over spring-damper arrangement, all connected to the wheels using off-the-shelf front uprights, ball joints and trunnions. The steering gear was solid-mounted rack and pinion using components from the Triumph Herald.

The rear suspension was a heavily modified version of the Chapman strut, originally developed for Chapman's earlier Formula racing car designs and used in the Elan. In the Europa, the vertical "strut" element pivots on the wheel hub at its lower end and doesn't control wheel camber angle as-in earlier Lotus designs. Wheel location and alignment is controlled instead by interaction between a fixed-length, articulated driveshaft top link, a simple tubular lower link, and a large box-section radius arm running diagonally forward to the chassis. These radius arms played a critical role in giving the precise tracking and handling desired, as the Chapman Strut's use of the driveshaft to resist lateral forces was compromised by the rubber engine and transaxle mounts needed to isolate vibrations from the car body. A careful compromise between the radius arm mount's stiffness, isolation and car handling was required, culminating eventually in a sandwich bush that was flexible against shear but stiff in compression and tension. The car's subsequent resulting handling prompted automotive writers to describe the Europa as the nearest thing to a Formula car for the road.

=== Series 1 ===
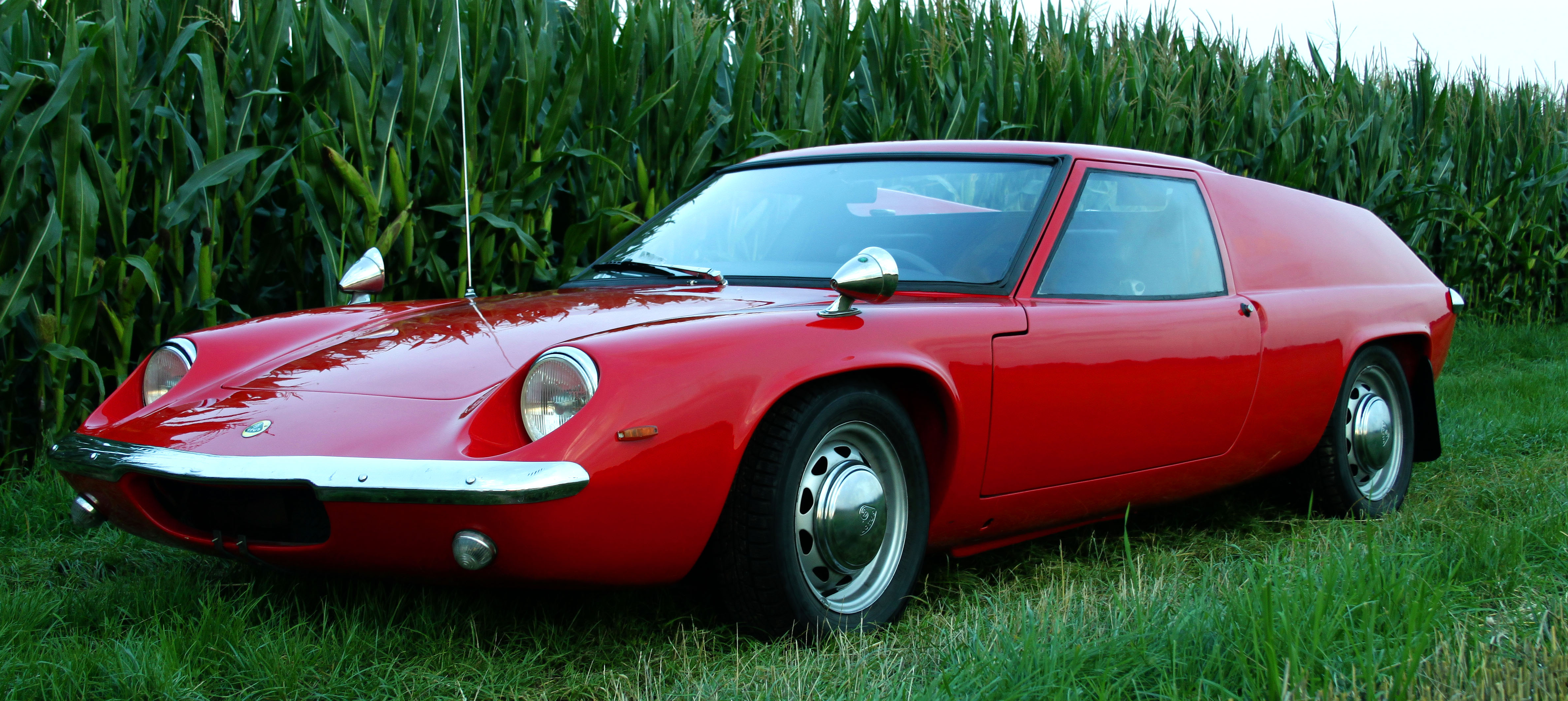
Lotus Europa Series 1 (Type 46)

The Series 1 or S1 Europa (also known as Lotus Type 46) was announced for sale to European markets on 20 December 1966. The first cars were delivered in France in February 1967. Volkswagen owned the rights to the Europa name in Germany, so cars for sale in Germany were badged Europe rather than Europa.

The S1 was fitted with a modified Renault 16 1,470 cc straight-four engine and a four-speed gearbox. The engine was a special 82 hp (61 kW) version (as opposed to the 63 hp (47 kW) generated in standard form). Lotus adapted the affordable but lightweight Renault engine and gearbox to the revolutionary Europa longitudinal mid-engined layout, inverting the gearbox's crown wheel on its pinion gear to avoid having four reverse gears. The S1 weighed 610 kg (1,345 lb). Autocar magazine achieved a top speed of 121 mph (195 km/h), and recorded a 0–60 mph acceleration time of 9.3 seconds. Of particular note, in excess of 0.9 g (8 m/s^{2}) lateral acceleration was consistently achieved by Car magazine on road tyres of that era.

Only 296 examples of the original S1 were manufactured (chassis numbers from 460001 to 460296). These cars had extremely light and minimalist construction, with fixed side windows, fixed seats (adjustable pedals needing the use of tools), no door handles, no internal door covers, and an aluminium dashboard. The steel chassis central beam was sandwiched (incorporated) within the fibreglass bodywork, thus reinforcing stiffness, but making repair rather complicated.

Later S1s, including the 1A and B (around 350 built) had removable side windows, a wooden dashboard, and internal door panel covers that could accommodate the windows once taken off. The series 1B had a redesigned rear panel, with new, rectangular light clusters.

Total S1 production, including the S1A and S1B (which incorporated some of the later S2 changes) variations, was 644.

=== Series 2 ===
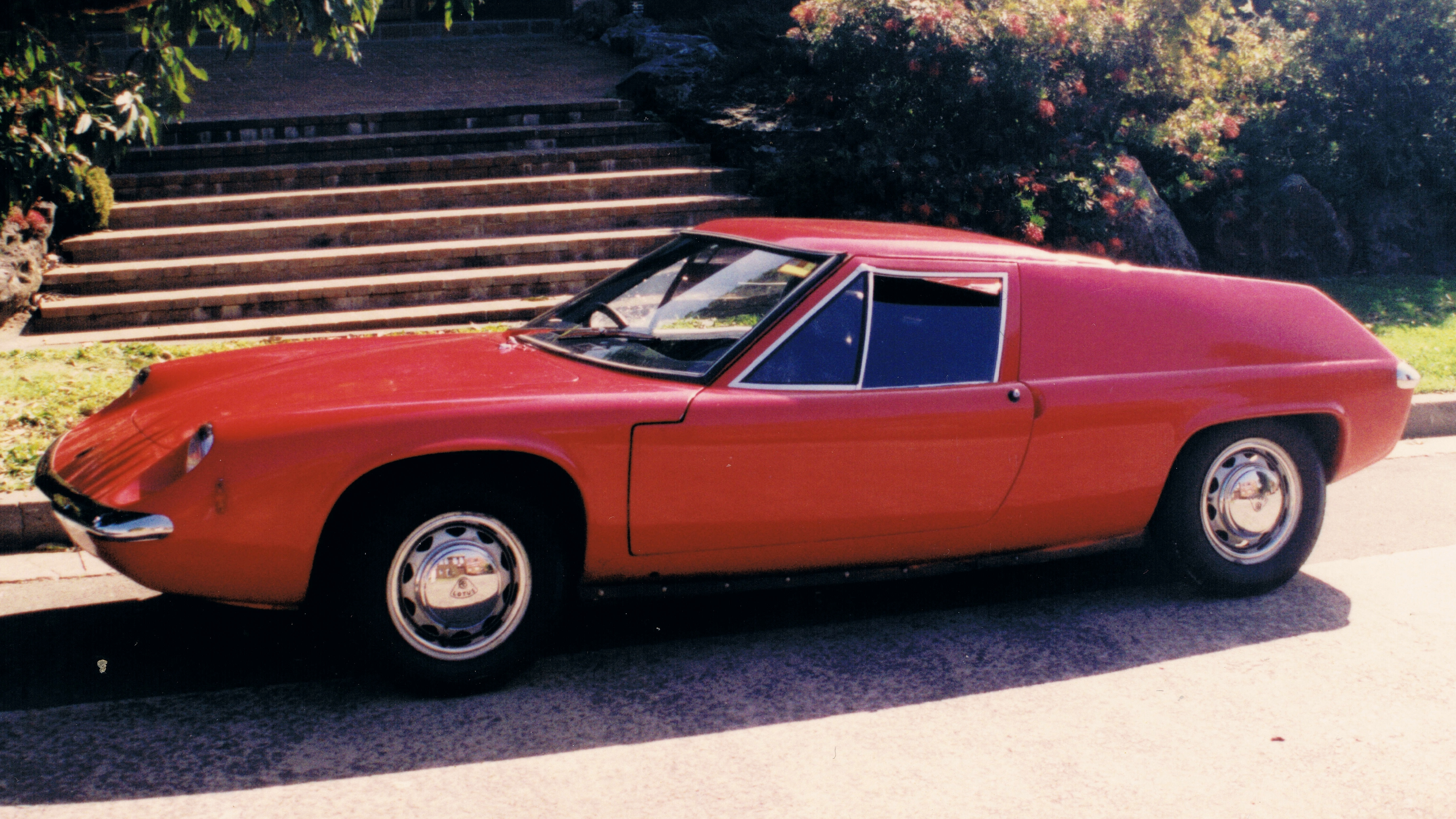
1968 Lotus Europa S2. The early S2 models were produced with S1-style front indicators and door handles. Note the S2 two-pane opening windows

The Europa Series 2, or Lotus Type 54, was introduced in April 1968 (approximately chassis number 0645 onwards). The S2 used the same 1,470 cc Renault engine and mechanical components as the earlier Series 1, but added a number of key refinements including opening electric windows, adjustable seats, a new fully carpeted interior and a polished wooden fascia panel for the dashboard. The most significant change was the switch from fully bonded construction to the use of bolt fasteners to attach the fibreglass body to the backbone steel frame. While reducing the torsional and flexural stiffness somewhat, the use of a separable body was welcomed by the automotive insurance industry as it greatly reduced the complexity and cost of making repairs to the vehicle.

Early examples of the S2 were externally almost identical to the S1 with the exception of the new windows. From early 1969, secondary front indicator lamp nacelles were added between the headlights, and larger door handles were used in place of the S1's push-button items. During 1968 a number of Europas (and Elans) were produced bearing black-and-silver Lotus badges on the nose and steering wheel in place of the customary yellow-and-green ones. The official Lotus Cars website states these "black-badge" vehicles were to commemorate the death earlier in 1968 of Jim Clark, Lotus's champion Formula One driver, however this is debated by other sources.

Contemporary road tests for the Europa S2 recorded a top speed around 120 mph (195 km/h), 0-60 mph acceleration times of 9.3 seconds, standing 1/4 mile times of around 16.7 seconds, and an overall economy of around 30 mpg (9.4 L/100 km).

=== United States ===
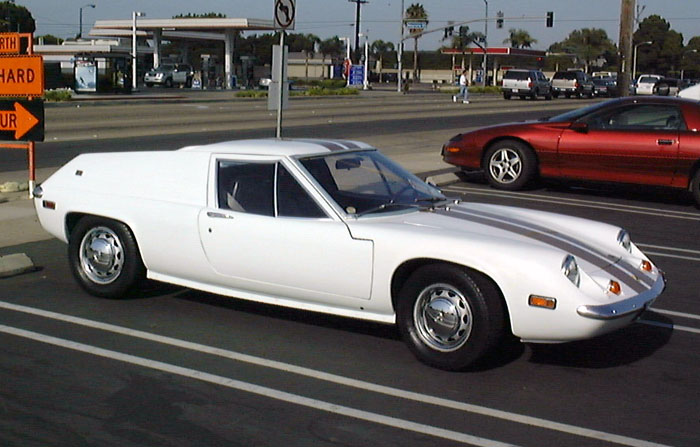
Federalized Lotus Europa (Type 65)

A small number of Series 2 vehicles were modified to be "federalized" for export to the United States. These Federal Type 54s had the low front fenders (guards) of the European model and the larger 1,565 cc engine of the later Lotus Type 65. In 1969–70, the Type 65 (also known as S2 Federal) was introduced specifically for export to the U.S., with additional changes to the body, chassis, suspension and the powerplant to better comply with U.S. D.O.T. standards. Among the changes, the engine was a slightly modified emission controlled Renault 16TL 1,565 cc unit rated at 80 hp rather than the 1,470 cc engine of the Type 54. The front suspension was changed to make the front end of the car taller along with taller front fenders to raise the headlamps. Road & Track magazine tested the Federal S2 and recorded 0-60 mph acceleration time of 9.6 seconds with a top speed of 116 mph (187 km/h).

In total, Lotus produced 3,615 Europa S2s.

=== Twin Cam and Special ===
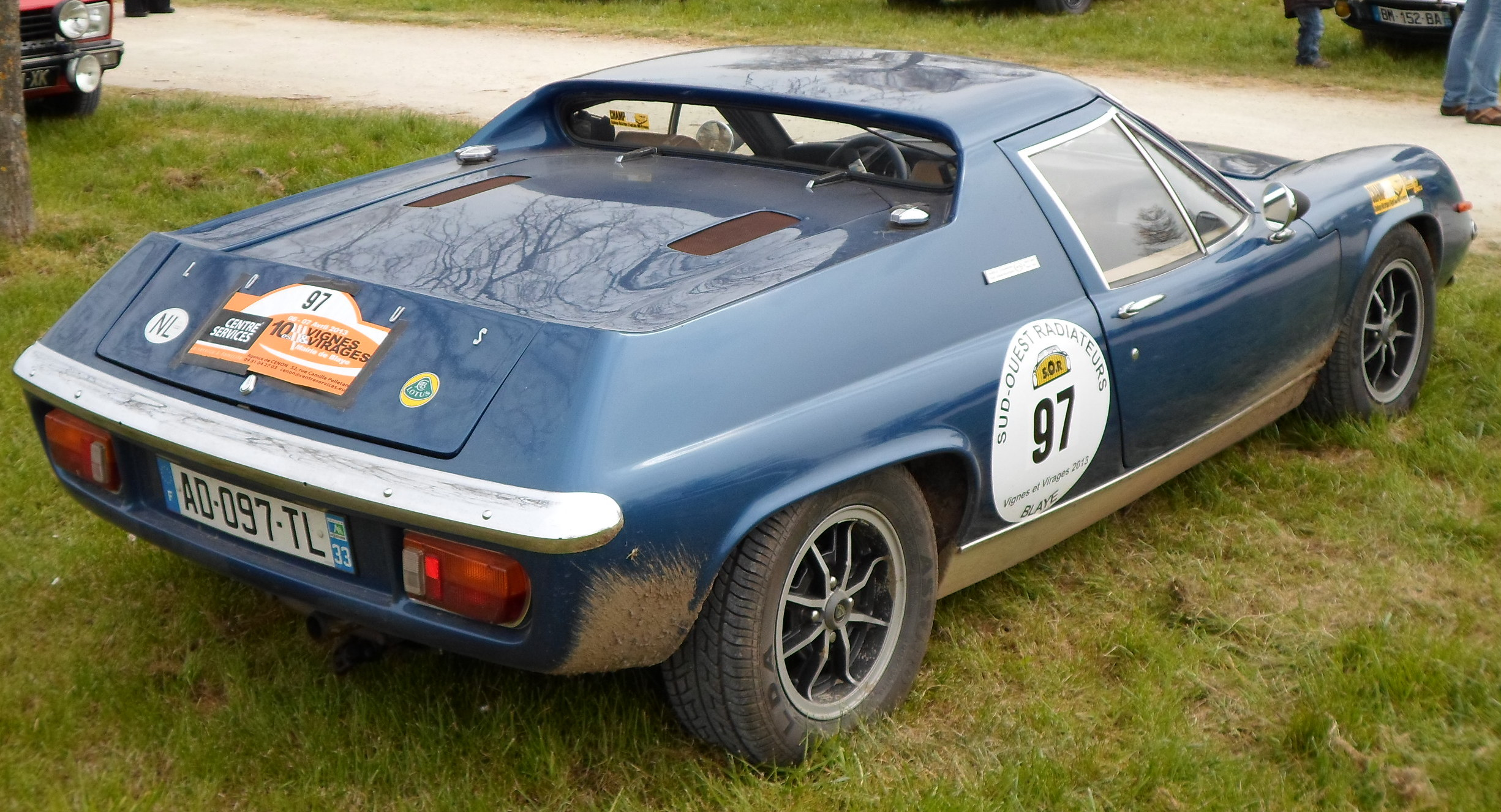
Lotus Europa Twin Cam

In 1971, the Type 74 Europa Twin Cam was made available to the public, with a 105 hp, 1,558 cc Lotus-Ford Twin Cam engine (113 hp US "Federal" version with standard emissions control and Big Valve engine with Stromberg carburetors, until the end of production) and a re-designed bodyshell to improve rearward visibility. Initially it was available with the same gearbox as the earlier cars, once the supply had been exhausted in 1972 a new stronger Renault four-speed gearbox (Type 352) was introduced. Mike Kimberley, who rose to become chief executive of Group Lotus, then a new engineer at Lotus, was appointed Chief Engineer of the Europa TC project. 1,580 cars were shipped as Europa "Twin Cam" before Lotus switched to a 126 hp "Big Valve" version of the engine.

In Europe and rest of the world markets, the Big Valve "Europa Special" version was aspirated by a Dell'Orto carburettored version of the same engine; it also offered a new Renault five-speed (Type 365) gearbox option. It weighed 740 kg (1,631 lb); Motor magazine tested a UK Special to a top speed of 123 mph (198 km/h), recorded a 0–60 mph acceleration time in 6.6 seconds, and ran the 1/4 mile in 14.9 seconds. In the US version of the Europa Special, where the Federalized version of the Big Valve had already been introduced earlier in the Twin Cam model, the only changes were larger brakes and the optional five-speed transmission which would become standard on the special in 1974.

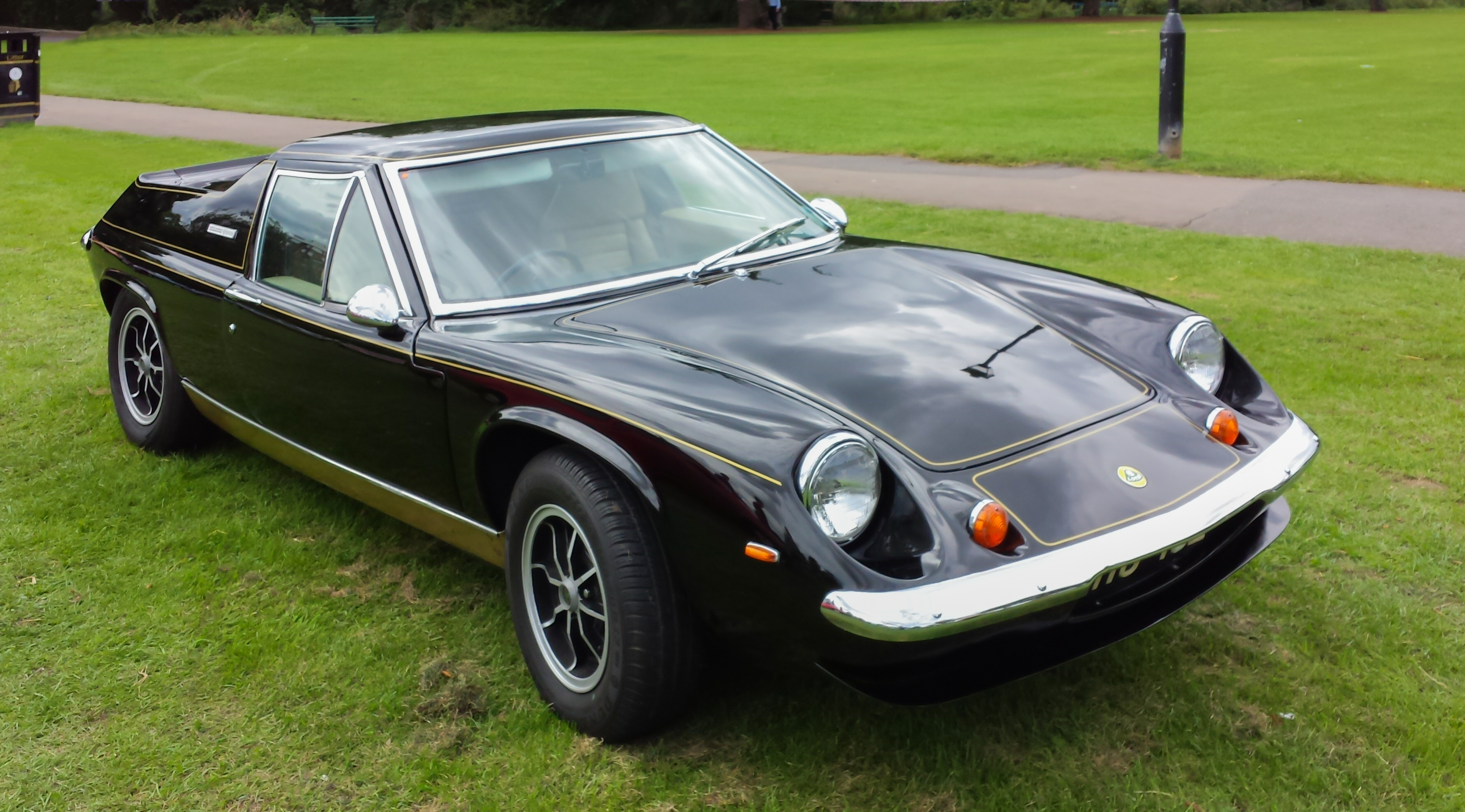
1972 Lotus Europa Special

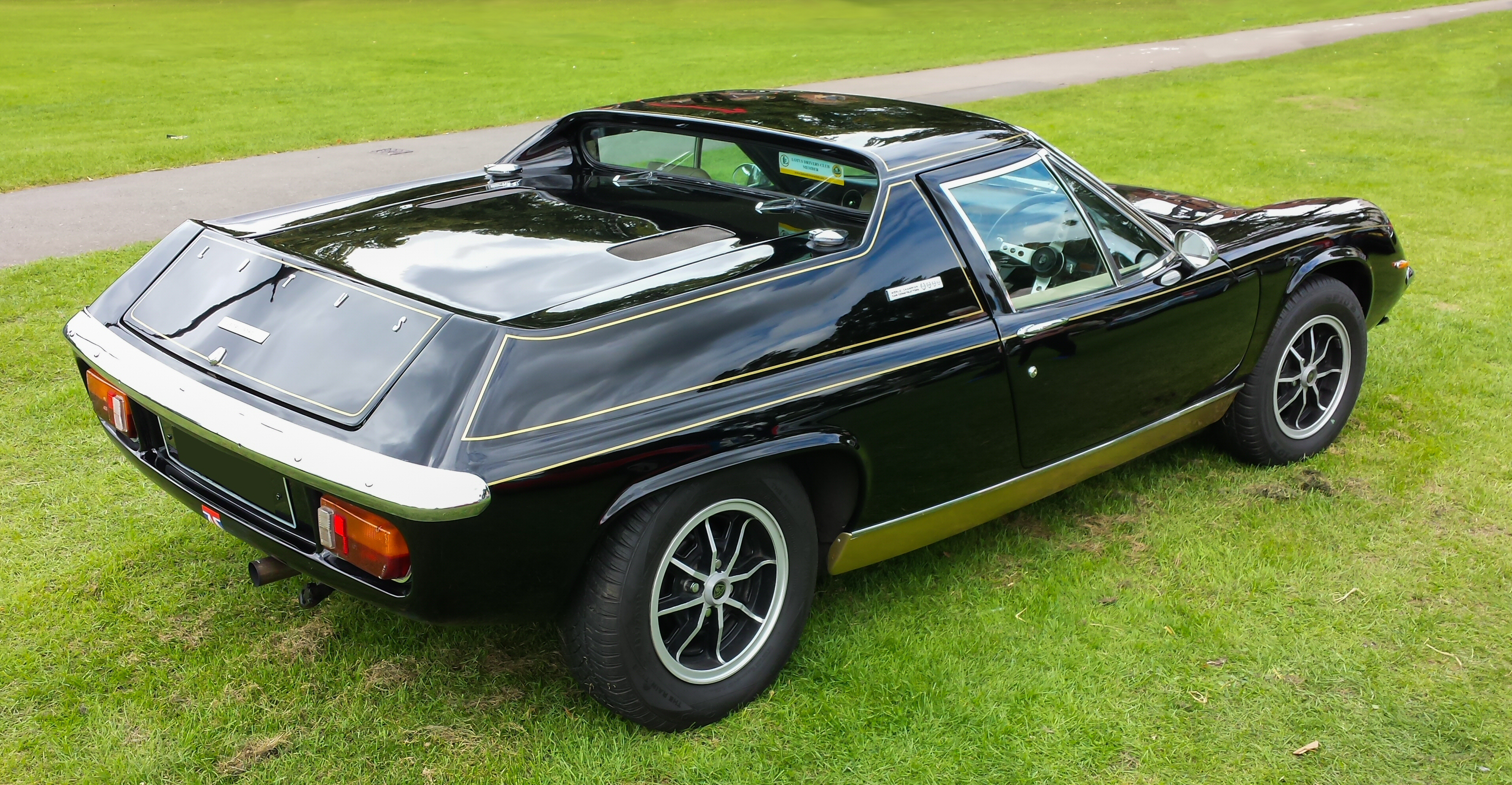
1972 Lotus Europa Special

Introduced in September 1972, the first 100 Lotus Europa JPS Specials were badged and painted to honour Team Lotus's 1972 F1 World Championship title win with John Player Special as the team’s sponsor. All with a five-speed gearbox and Big Valve engine the original Specials were painted black with a gold pin stripe matching the livery of the GP cars – plus a numbered JPS dashboard badge. These were the first John Player Special commemorative Lotus production vehicles. The "Special" name and colour scheme was planned to be dropped after the commemorative cars, with Lotus reverting to the Twin Cam name, but such was the positive reaction to the new car that the name and the black and gold pin stripe colour scheme continued until the end of Europa production although colours other than black were made available.

In the end the numbered dashboard plaque distinguished the first, original, 100 JPS cars from other black Europa Specials.

In total 4,710 Type 74s were produced, of which 3,130 were badged "Specials".

=== Type 47 and 62 ===
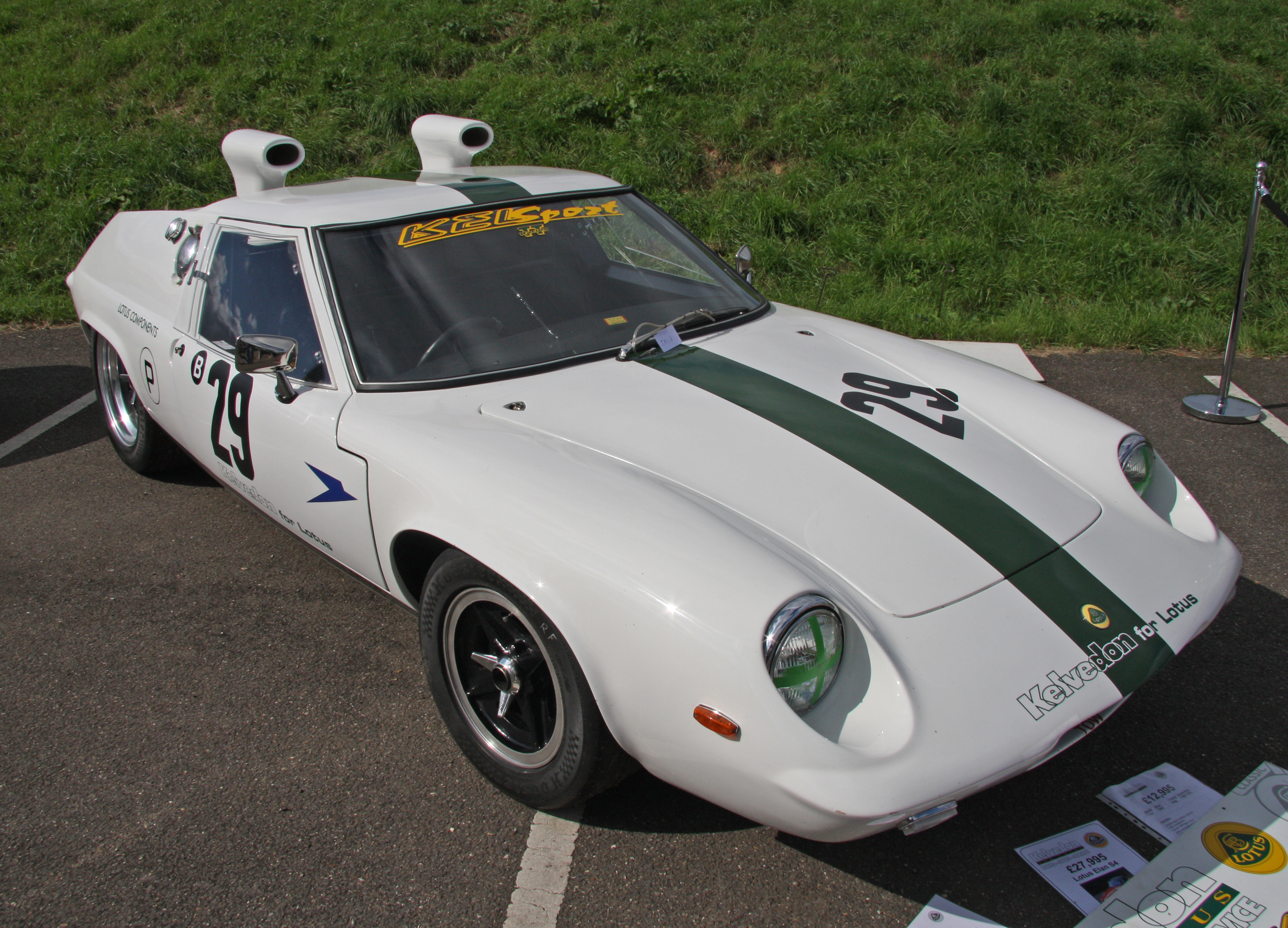
Lotus Type 47

Although the original Europa was intended as a clubman's sports racer to replace the Lotus 7, it was realised that the car would be uncompetitive with the Renault engines available. A decision was therefore made to manufacture a specialist race car based on the Europa to be raced by Team Lotus and sold to private entrants. Although the very first Type 47 was based on a modified Europa, all subsequent cars were produced entirely by Lotus Components rather than the main factory. Launched at the same time as the S1 Europa, the body of the 47 was thinner than the standard Europa and with larger wheel arches. Side vents into the engine bay were added after the first few cars experienced problems with engine bay temperature.

The engine, gearbox and rear suspension were completely different from the standard Europa and were taken in their entirety from the Lotus 23/Lotus 22 Formula Junior cars with a Lotus-Ford Twin Cam based 165 hp (123 kW) 1,594 cc Cosworth Mk.XIII dry sump engine, and a Hewland FT 200 five-speed gearbox and suspension with reversed bottom wishbone, top link and dual radius arms. The front upright was specially cast in common with the F2 version of Lotus 41X to accommodate larger Girling brakes for the later 47A model (which had the Alfa Romeo tail lamp shared with the Europa S2) with reinforced front frame.

The Type 47 exact production numbers are unknown, the last car was 47GT-85 but it is unlikely that 85 47GT's were produced, estimates vary from 55 to 68 during the years 1966–70. Although the 47GT is the best known, a few 47F's were produced, these had the detachable body similar to the S2 Europa, but retaining the large wheel arches and side vents of the 47GT. Fitted with a tuned Ford cross flow engine but with the Renault gearbox and rear suspension of the Europa. At the request of parts supplier GKN, Lotus built the 47D as a show car. The 47D has a slightly enlarged chassis and body to fit a Rover V8 engine. At the time the 47D was built, it was capable of 0–100 mph (0–161 km/h) in 10 seconds.

As a mobile test bed for the new 2-litre Lotus 907 engine being developed for the forthcoming Elite and Eclat, the Type 62 was produced. Only two such cars were ever made. These were space frame cars with F1 suspension to handle the 240 hp power output from the engine. Although deliberately made to resemble the Europa, in practice the only connection to the Europa was a few of the Europa's body panels. It won its class in its first event the 1969 BOAC 500 at Brands Hatch with John Miles and Brian Muir at the wheel. Replica 47's and 62's are bespoke-manufactured by Banks Europa Engineering, in several variations.

=== Specials ===
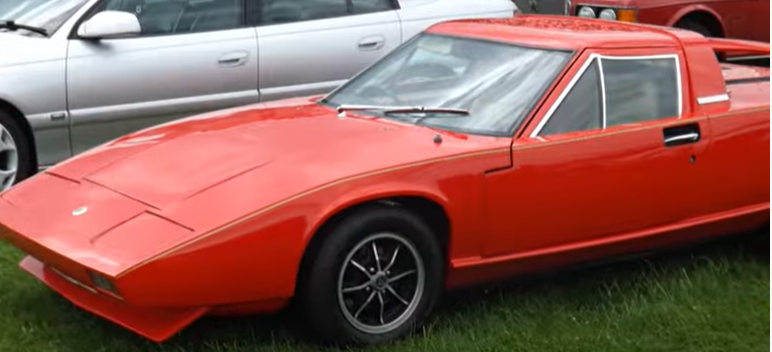
1972 GS Lotus Europa

Throughout its life, the Europa attracted the attention of many Lotus and non-Lotus automotive customising businesses who offered "special" versions in small numbers to the public. Among these was the Swiss Lotus importer, who made two special versions of the S2 fitted with the Renault 16 TS type 807 engine, the "Europa Hemi 807" and the fuel injected "Europa Black Shadow 807". The Hemi 807 had 105 PS (77 kW) SAE and could attain a speed of 200 km/h (124 mph), while the Black Shadow had power output of 137 PS (101 kW). The Black Shadow also received a five-speed gearbox. These cars had a wider track, special wheels and stickers, white indicator lights up front, and featured extractor vents high on the side panel behind the rear door. The fuel injection system was from Kugelfischer. In 1971 two Lotus Hemi were entered as Group 4 GTS at the international hill climb race St. Ursanne Les Rangiers and Ollon-Villars driven by the Swiss drivers Oskar Bubeck and Alfons Tresch.

Chip Foose, the well known automobile pioneer from the United States, also modified and restored a Lotus Europa for Episode 6 of the season 11 of his show Overhaulin'. A brand new 1.8 litre four cylinder engine from an Elise was fitted into the car, while the power is handled by Porsche Boxster transmission. The bumpers were also tucked in signature Foose style.

in 1972 a Bristol based company called GS Cars produced a variant of the Lotus Europa. This version is based on the standard Lotus Europa Twin Cam, but has new bodywork which bears some resemblance to the Maserati Merak. The GS Lotus Europa was limited to 17 units. However, only five are known to still exist.

=== Zakspeed Turbo ===
1979 Lotus Europa Turbo Gr.5

Zakspeed and Harald Ertl in 1979 built a Group 5 Lotus Europa Turbo for Deutsche Rennsport Meisterschaft (DRM), using a ToJ sportscar chassis, the 4cyl-Ford-based Zakspeed turbo engine, and parts of a Lotus Europa.

== Europa S (2006–2010) ==
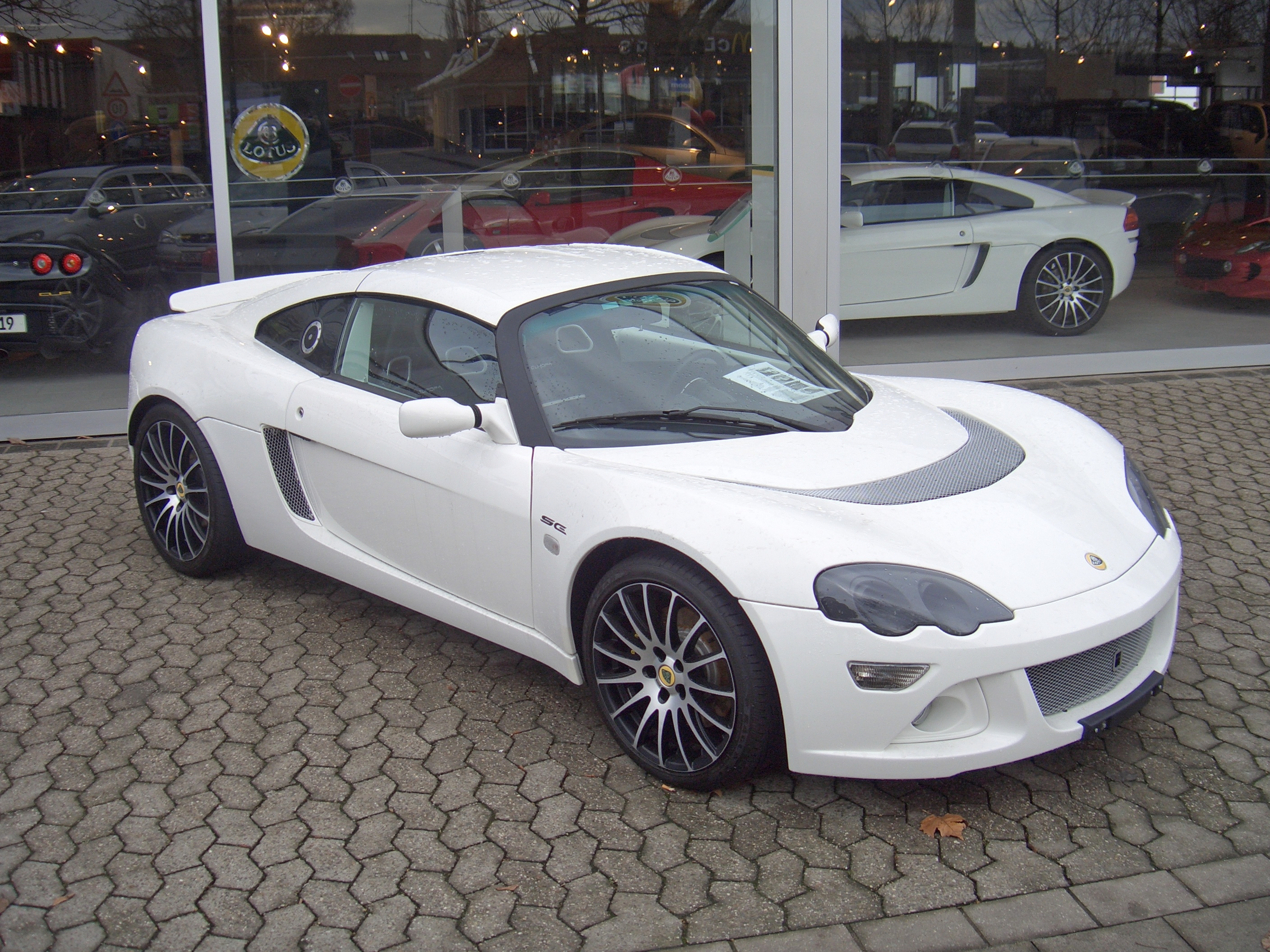
2008 Lotus Europa SE

In 2005, Lotus released images of a new GT type car called the Lotus Europa S. Based on the Lotus Elise, the car was officially introduced at the 2006 Geneva Motor Show. Production commenced in July 2006 and continued until 2010. The engine was a 2.0 L (120 cu in) turbocharged four cylinder, rated at 200 PS (147 kW; 197 hp) at 5,400 rpm, with a maximum torque of 272 N⋅m (201 lb⋅ft) at 5,400 rpm. The Europa S could accelerate from 0–60 mph (0–97 km/h) in 5.6 seconds (0–100 km/h (0–62 mph) in 5.8 seconds), with a maximum speed of 143 mph (230 km/h). Lotus did not export the Europa S to the United States. Despite this, the American manufacturer Dodge developed an electric vehicle based on the Europa, known as the Dodge Circuit, which it planned to bring to the US market by 2010, but the project was cancelled in May 2009.

The Europa SE was unveiled at the Geneva International Motor Show on 5 March 2008. The SE was an upgraded model with more comfort in mind, intended to bring in more customers. The SE has the same engine as the S but it was modified to bring power to 225 PS (165 kW; 222 hp) and torque to 300 N⋅m (221 lb⋅ft).
