= Group D Production Sports Cars =

CAMS motor racing category

Group D Production Sports Cars was a CAMS motor racing category current in Australia from 1972 to 1981.

The Group D category catered for series-production type automobiles, other than those eligible to compete as Touring Cars, which were:

- Recognised by the FIA as Group 3 or Group 4 cars, or
- Of a type of which at least 50 examples existed in Australia, or
- Of a type which CAMS deemed to be eligible

Bodywork could be of an open or closed type and was required to provide adequate accommodation for a minimum of two persons. The original design of the cylinder-block, cylinder-head, transmission and suspension had to be retained and forced induction was permitted only if fitted as standard by the manufacturer. Minor changes to bodywork, mudguards and interior trim were permitted. A 5000cc engine capacity limit which was applied at the time of the introduction of the category was later raised to 6000cc.

Cars from the Group D Production Sports Cars category were eligible to compete in Australian Sports Car Championship races alongside those from the Group A Sports Cars category from 1972 to 1975 and in May 1975, Production Sports Cars contested the revived Australian Tourist Trophy held at Calder Raceway. In 1976, Group D became the sole category to contest the Australian Sports Car Championship, a situation which applied through to 1981. The category was discontinued at the end of that year and the Group D designation was applied to a new category for GT Cars from 1982.

== Group B Improved Production Sports Cars and Group D Series Production Sports Cars ==
Prior to the introduction of the new category in 1972, the Confederation of Australian Motor Sport had promulgated regulations for both Group B Improved Production Sports Cars and Group D Series Production Sports Cars, the former for modified vehicles of which at least 100 examples had been produced and the latter for virtually standard cars. Both categories had been introduced in 1964.
