= Veskanda C1 =

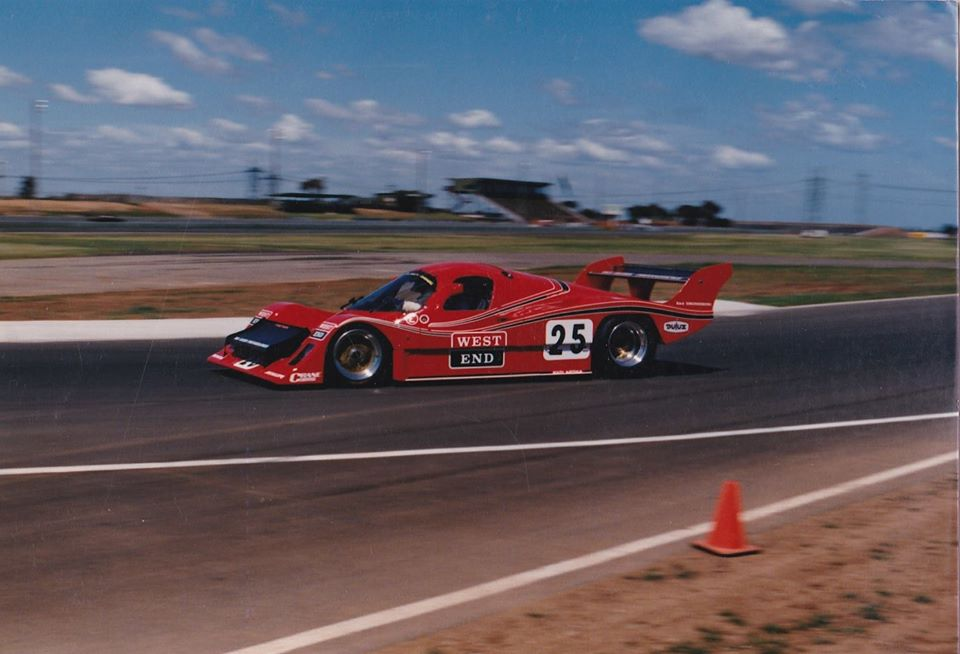
- Veskanda October 1986 ASCC Calder Park
- Category: Group A Sports Cars; Group C IMSA GTP
- Constructor: K&A Engineering
- Designers: Harry Aust; Dale Koennecke

Technical specifications
- Chassis: Aluminium monocoque
- Suspension (front): Lower wishbones, top rockers, in-board coil springs over dampers, anti-roll bar
- Suspension (rear): Multi-link, coil springs over dampers, anti-roll bar
- Length: 4,800 mm (189.0 in)
- Width: 2,000 mm (78.7 in)
- Wheelbase: 2,710 mm (106.7 in)
- Engine: 1985: mid-engine, longitudinally mounted, 4,958 cc (302.6 cu in), N/A Chevrolet V8; 1986-87: mid-engine, longitudinally mounted, 5,750 cc (350.9 cu in), N/A Chevrolet V8; 1988-: mid-engine, longitudinally mounted, 6,000 cc (366.1 cu in), N/A Chevrolet, V8
- Torque: 850 N⋅m (627 lb⋅ft)
- Transmission: Hewland DG300 5 speed manual
- Power: 650 hp (485 kW) (2012)
- Weight: 800 kg (1,763.7 lb)
- Fuel: Shell
- Tyres: Dunlop

Competition history
- Notable entrants: (Australia) Bernie van Elsen
- Notable drivers: (Australia) John Bowe (Australia) Dick Johnson (Australia) John Briggs (Australia) Paul Stubber (Australia) Mick Monterosso
- Debut: 1985 Australian Sports Car Championship Round 4 at Adelaide International Raceway
Races	Wins	Poles	F/Laps
16	12	14	14
- Drivers' Championships: 1 (1986 - John Bowe)

The Veskanda C1 (more commonly known as just "Veskanda") is a one-off, Australian designed and built, mid-engined closed top racing car built in 1985 to CAMS Group A Sports Car specifications. Powered by a Chevrolet V8 engine, the car is generally regarded as the fastest sports car ever built in Australia and as of 2016 remains one of Australia's fastest race cars.

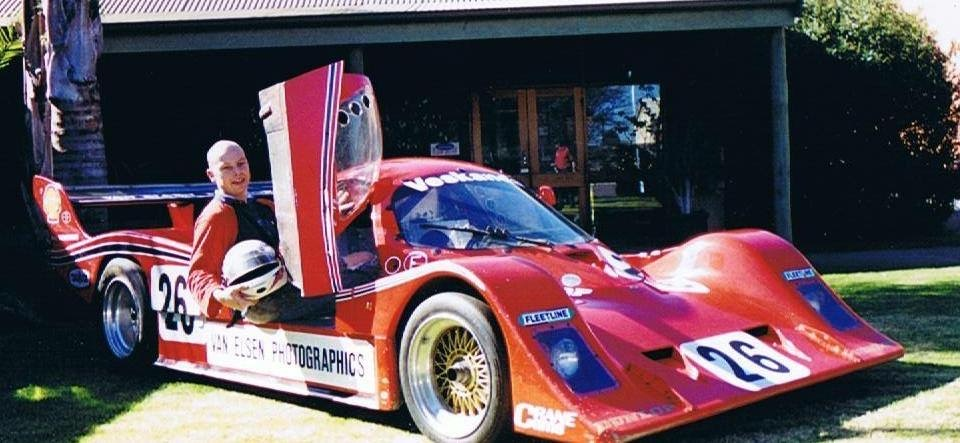
Veskanda at K&A 1996

== Concept ==
In December 1984, Australia held its first ever FIA World Championship motor racing event, a 1000 km World Endurance Championship event at Melbourne's Sandown Raceway (pre-dating the 1985 Australian Grand Prix Formula One race in Adelaide by 11 months). One of the spectators at the event was Adelaide based Australian Sports Car Championship competitor and professional photographer Bernie van Elsen who was inspired to build an Australian Group C sports car. At the time it was to be the first of three WSC races at Sandown, but the 1985 and 1986 races which van Elsen planned to enter with the car were eventually canceled.

== Build ==
Van Elsen commissioned Adelaide based engineering firm K&A Engineering run by Dale Koennecke (a former engineer for Garrie Cooper's Ansett Team Elfin) and Harry Aust to build a Ground effect racing sports car that not only complied to CAMS Group A rules but also to the FIA's Group C rules while also being compliant to the American IMSA GT Championship regulations. K&A were already prominent in Australian motor racing having rebuilt John Briggs' rapid Dekon Chevrolet Monza which had raced in the national Sports Sedan and GT championships during the early 1980s, and most notably the Don Elliot owned Alfa Romeo Alfetta GTV (originally powered by a 4.9 L (4,940 cc) Repco Holden V8 and later a 5.0 L (4,958 cc) and 6.0 L (6,000 cc) Chevrolet's) that Tony Edmonson drove to win the 1980 and 1981 Australian Sports Car titles.

Van Elsen purchased an old Lola T400 F5000 car to use its suspension, transmission and 5.0 Chevrolet V8 engine which produced approximately 520 hp (390 kW). The Veskanda also featured an aluminium monocoque and a Porsche 956 style full width rear wing (a small front wing was also used when extra downforce was needed, though wind tunnel testing by Porsche would find that these wings were actually disrupting the airflow over the cars which increased the aerodynamic drag, thus making the cars slower in a straight line. Though Porsche allegedly did not tell its customer teams this fact and it wasn't a fact known to K&A). And to comply with the Group C and IMSA GTP regulations, the Veskanda featured the pedal box behind (essentially in line with) the front axle. The car was completed with a full fibreglass body.

The car, named the VESKANDA (for Van Elsen Special K AND A), was the second closed top, ground effect racing sports car built in Australia following on from the Romano WE84 designed and built by Queensland based Kaditcha owner Barry Lock in 1982. The Romano, which started life named the Kaditcha K583, was powered by a, ex-McLaren Cosworth DFV Formula One V8 engine and had dominated the 1984 Australian Sports Car Championship in the hands of its owner Bap Romano (van Elsen had finished 28th in the championship driving a Bolwell Nagari). By the time the Veskanda was debuted in 1985, Romano had upgraded from the 430 hp (320 kW), 3.0 L (2,998 cc) Cosworth DFV engine to the larger 3.9 L (3,995 cc) Cosworth DFL V8 engine developed for sports car racing (like the Chevrolet, it was rated at 530 hp (400 kW)).

== Racing ==
=== 1985 ===
The Veskanda was completed by June 1985 and van Elsen enlisted the services of 1984 and 1985 CAMS Gold Star winner John Bowe to drive the car in the 1985 Australian Sports Car Championship. After a test crash at the Adelaide International Raceway (caused by wheel failure) put back the cars debut by two months, Bowe debuted the car in Round 4 of the series at AIR. Bowe would take his first win in the series in the next round at Calder Park in Melbourne, easily defeating the previously dominant Kaditcha Chevrolet of Chris Clearihan (the eventual series champion), and Terry Hook in his ex-1982 Le Mans Lola T610 Chevrolet (the car had used the 3.9L Cosworth DFL at the Sarthe classic). Bowe's late series run would see him finish 7th in the championship.

=== 1986 ===
For the 1986 championship, CAMS lifted the engine capacity limit for Over 3 litre cars from 5,000 cc (305.1 cu in) to 6,000 cc (366.1 cu in). van Elsen, along with most other Chevrolet V8 runners, took advantage of the new rules and replaced the 5.0 litre V8 with the more powerful (590 hp (440 kW)) Chevrolet 350 (5.7 litre) V8. Like most Chevrolet users in the championship, van Elsen chose the 5.7 litre engine rather than a 6.0 litre engine due to the fuel limit per race imposed by CAMS (bringing the championship in line with the FIA's WSC regulations). With the new power plant in the Veskanda, Bowe would completely dominate the 1986 ASCC. He scored pole position at all 5 rounds, won all 7 races that made up the championship and set fastest lap in each race (all class lap records), including outright circuit records at Calder Park and the fast Surfers Paradise International Raceway.

Bowe finished the championship with a maximum 120 points, 34.5 points clear of second placed Terry Hook's Lola T610 Chevrolet and 42.5 clear of reigning champion Chris Clearihan driving his Kaditcha Chevrolet. As of June 2025, Bowe's outright lap record at the 2.280 km (1.417 mi) Calder Park circuit (52.69) has yet to be beaten, while his record lap at the 3.219 km (2.000 mi) Surfers Paradise circuit (1:04.3) was not beaten by the time the circuit closed in 1987.

=== 1987 ===
Bowe and the Veskanda were again expected to dominate the 1987 Australian Sports Car Championship which was only run over 3 rounds after the 3 final rounds were canceled due to a lack of entries (which some blamed on the Veskanda's dominance). However, engine problems in the wet opening round at Calder Park meant winning back to back titles was a long shot. Bowe would bounce back in rounds 2 and 3 at Amaroo Park and Sandown and would eventually finish 2nd in the championship, 19 points behind Andy Roberts in his self-designed Roberts SR3 powered by a 1.6 litre Ford engine producing around 220 hp (160 kW). Under CAMS point scoring rules which gave extra points for lower capacity cars finishing in outright positions, Roberts scored more points (27) for finishing 2nd at Amaroo than Bowe who scored 25 points for winning the race. This and finishing in 4th place in the opening and final rounds allowed Roberts to claim the championship.

Bowe's win at Amaroo Park also saw him set the circuit's outright lap record with a 44.36 second lap. This time would remain the outright lap record for the circuit until it closed in 1998.

=== 1988 ===
With John Bowe moving to drive the higher profile (in Australia) Group A touring cars full-time in 1988, van Elsen did not enter the Veskanda in the 1988 Australian Sports Car Championship which (as of 2025) would prove to be the final Australian Sports Car Championship ever run. The car did run in some local South Australian based sports car and sports sedan races through the year including being driven by noted Adelaide sports sedan racer Mick Monterosso who set the short circuit lap record in the car at the Adelaide International Raceway.

After the canceled 1985 and 1986 World Sportscar Championship races (and a rumoured WSC race at Surfers Paradise in 1986 which eventually fell through), Sandown in Melbourne was again to host the final round of the 1988 World Sportscar Championship. Unlike the 1984 race, the FIA did not allow Australian sports cars and sports sedans to enter the event as they did not conform to the WSC regulations. However, as his car did comply to the regulations, van Elsen entered the Veskanda and again enlisted John Bowe to drive. Bowe was partnered in the event, the 360 km of Sandown Park by his touring car teammate and boss, reigning (and then 4 time) Australian Touring Car Champion Dick Johnson who had driven in the 1984 race driving a similarly powered (6.0 L) Chevrolet Monza. To get Johnson accustomed to the car, he raced it in (and won) an invitational Sports Car and Sports Sedan support category at the 1988 Australian Grand Prix in Adelaide the week before the WSC race.

For the event, the Veskanda was upgraded to a 600 hp (450 kW), 6.0 L (6,000 cc) Chevrolet V8 engine. In the C1 class the Veskanda was up against the world's leading sports prototype cars including the 750 hp (560 kW) 7.0 L (6,995 cc) V12 powered Jaguar XJR-9's from Tom Walkinshaw Racing (and including Formula One drivers such as 1988 WSC Drivers' World Champion Martin Brundle, plus Jan Lammers, Johnny Dumfries and then current Grand Prix driver Eddie Cheever), the 800 hp (600 kW), turbocharged, 5.0 L (4,973 cc) Mercedes-Benz V8 powered Sauber C9's (who also boasted F1 level talent such as former Ferrari and McLaren F1 driver Stefan Johansson as well as Mauro Baldi and Jochen Mass). Along with the Jaguars and Sauber Mercedes were the 780 hp (580 kW), 3.0 L (2,994 cc) turbo Porsche 962's, though unlike 1984 when the Porsche's had been dominant with their 956 model, the 962's in 1988 had been generally out-classed by the Mercs and Jags.

With the team openly admitting that the local car lacked both the outright power and the fuel monitoring sophistication of the WSC regulars, Bowe qualified in a credible 8th place with a time of 1:35.510, though Johnson complained of chronic understeer through Sandown's tight infield section (while Bowe's time was the fastest ever for an Australian driver/car combination on the 3.9 km International Sandown circuit, beating his own qualifying time of 1:35.6 in a Formula Mondial Ralt RT4 during the final round of his successful 1984 Australian Drivers' Championship campaign, it was still some 6.89 seconds behind the pole winning Sauber C9 of Frenchman Jean-Louis Schlesser who set circuits fastest ever lap of 1:28.620. Bowe's time was however 2.89 seconds faster than the fastest Australian qualifier in the 1984 race, his former open wheel sparring partner Alfredo Costanzo in the 3.9L Romano Cosworth). Bowe and Johnson would eventually finish in 8th place, 6 laps behind the Schlesser / Mass Sauber Mercedes but were later disqualified for exceeding the 190 litre fuel allowance limit (ironically giving Johnson his second WSC DQ in two races as the Monza he drove in 1984 had been disqualified for receiving outside assistance from the track marshals).

With CAMS closing the Australian Sports Car Championship following 1988 and the Sandown World Championship race again proving to be a one-off, the 1988 360 km of Sandown Park would prove to be the Veskanda's final competitive race.

== Post racing ==
In the following years, the Veskanda remained dormant until it was purchased by former Sports Sedan racer John Briggs who restored the car. It make a welcome on-track return at the Historic Sandown meeting in 2007 (with what Briggs described as a "very tired" 5.8 L V8 engine installed). Brigg's later got the chance to run it against other historic sports cars (including the Porsche 956) at the Phillip Island Classic meeting in 2011.

The Veskanda is currently owned and was driven in classic sports car events in Europe (including the very wet Le Mans Legend race in 2012 where the 6.0 litre Veskanda Chevrolet attained the top speed on the Mulsanne Straight with 259 km/h (161 mph) on its way to 8th place) by Western Australian driver/enthusiast Paul Stubber. Driving in the Group C - C1 historic sports car series which raced at such tracks as Le Mans, Silverstone, Donington, Nürburgring, Imola, Paul Ricard and Spa-Francorchamps, Stubber finished in 10th place in 2012 and 5th place in 2013.

The 650 hp (480 kW), 6.0 L Chevrolet V8 currently in the Veskanda was built by KRE Race Engines in Queensland. KRE are better known in Australia as engine builders for both V8 Supercars as well as a number of Australia's top Sprintcars.

== Race wins ==
=== Overall ===
- Australian Sports Car Championship – 1985 (x1), 1986 (x7), 1987 (x2)
- 1988 Australian Grand Prix support race (x2)

=== Series wins ===
- Australian Sports Car Championship - 1986
