= 1981 Australian Formula 2 Championship =

The 1981 Australian Formula 2 Championship was an Australian motor racing competition open to Australian Formula 2 racing cars. It was the 14th Australian Formula 2 Championship to be awarded by the Confederation of Australian Motor Sport.

The title was won by John Smith driving a Ralt RT1 Ford.

== Calendar ==
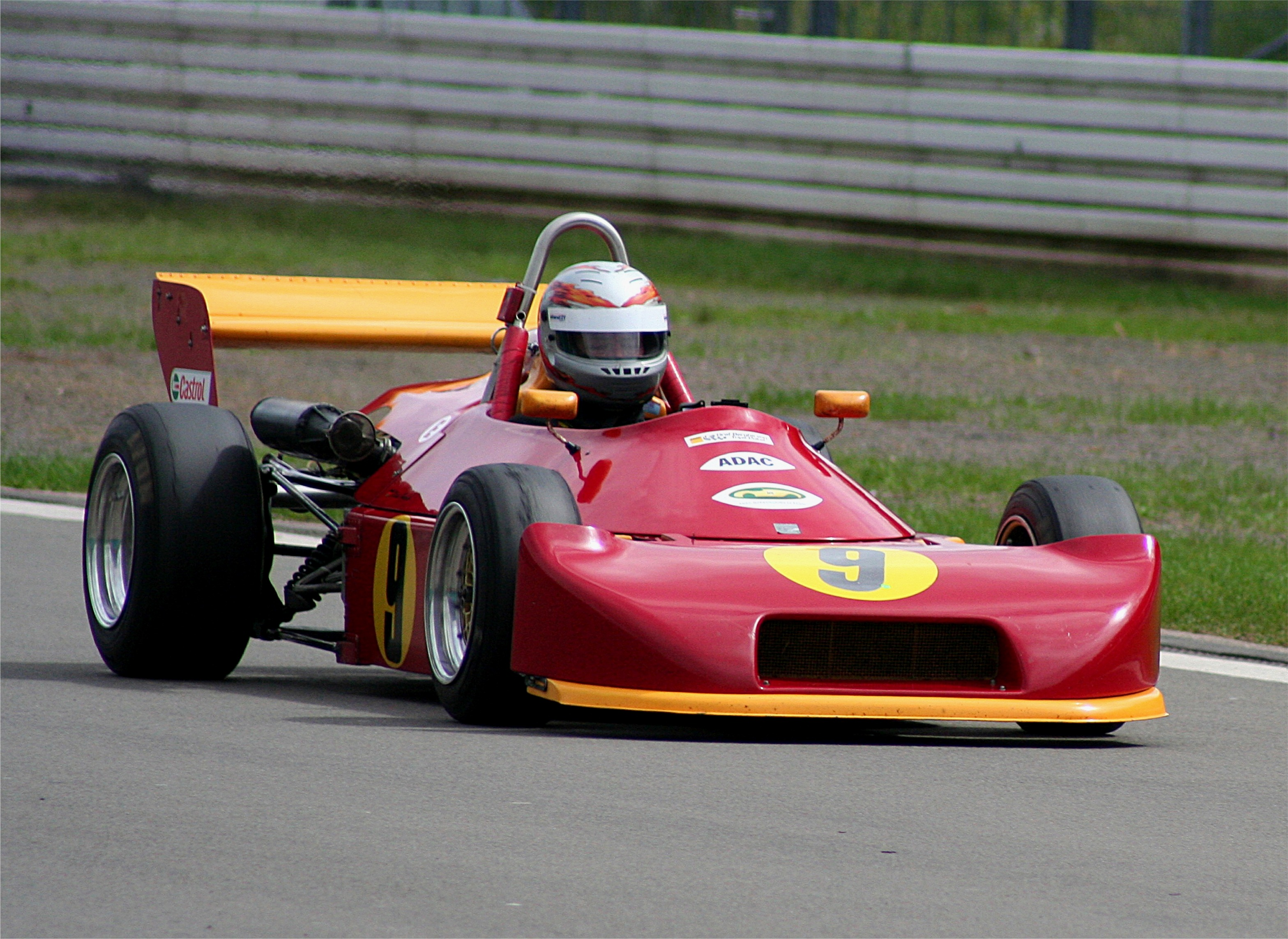
John Smith won the 1981 Australian Formula 2 Championship in a Ralt RT1, similar to that pictured above.

The championship was contested over a six-round series.

Rd	Name	Circuit	Date	Winning driver	Car
1		Winton	1 March	John Smith	Ralt RT1 Ford
2		Oran Park	3 May	John Smith	Ralt RT1 Ford
3		Amaroo Park	24 May	John Smith	Ralt RT1 Ford
4		Sandown Park	5 July	Russell Norden	Arbyen 793 Volkswagen
5		Adelaide International Raceway	25 October	Lucio Cesario	Ralt RT3 Volkswagen
6	EON FM Trophy	Calder	8 November	Lucio Cesario	Ralt RT3 Volkswagen

All rounds were staged over two heats except for the final round at Calder, which was contested as a single race.

== Points system ==
Championship points were awarded on a 9-6-4-3-2-1 basis for the first six positions at each round.
Where a round was contested over two heats, points were allocated on a 20-16-13-11-10-9-8-7-6-5-4-3-2-1 basis for the first 14 positions in each heat and then aggregated for each driver to determine the first six positions for the round.

== Results ==
Position	Driver	No.	Car	Entrant	Win	Ora	Ama	San	Ade	Cal	Total
1	John Smith	71	Ralt RT1 Ford	Ralt Australia	9	9	9	4	-	-	31
2	Richard Davison	1	Hardman JH1 Ford	Paragon Shoes Pty Ltd	1	6	6	-	-	6	19
=	Peter Macrow	25	Cheetah Mk 7 Isuzu	Peter Macrow	2	-	4	3	6	4	19
4	Lucio Cesario	16	Ralt RT3 Volkswagen	Formula 1 Automotive	-	-	-	-	9	9	18
5	Bob Prendegast	40	Cheetah Mk 7 Volkswagen	Rugolo Motor Body Works	6	-	2	6	3	-	17
6	Russell Norden	5	Arbyen 793 Volkswagen	Bonds Coats Patons Ltd	3	-	-	9	4	-	16
7	Graham Watson	9	Ralt RT3 Volkswagen	Ralt Australia	-	4	3	-	-	-	7
=	Bob Power	79	Kaditcha A80B Ford	Bob Power	4	1	-	-	2	-	7
9	John Bowe	33	Elfin GE Two-25 Volkswagen	Chris Leach Racing	-	3	1	-	-	-	4
10	Peter Glover	13	Cheetah Mk 7 Isuzu	Peter Glover	-	-	-	-	-	3	3
=	Hugh Gartley	92	Cheetah Mk 7 Toyota	Hugh Gartley	-	-	-	-	1	2	3
12	Andrew Newton	7	Hardman JH1 Ford	Clive Millis Motors	-	-	-	2	-	-	2
=	Chris Hocking	74	Cheetah Mk 7 Volkswagen	Chris Hocking	-	2	-	-	-	-	2
14	Grahame Blee	2	Cheetah Mk 6 GE Ford	Grahame Blee	-	-	-	1	-	-	1
=	Peter Hopwood	22	Cheetah Mk 6 Ford	John Thompson Sports Cars	-	-	-	-	-	1	1
