= 1988 Australian Sports Car Championship =

Seasons
- ← 1987 none →

The 1988 Australian Sports Car Championship was an Australian motor racing competition open to Group 2A Sports Cars (including Clubman cars at the sole discretion of CAMS), FISA C1 cars (up to 6 litres), FISA C2 cars (up to 5 litres) and Sports Sedans. It was sanctioned by the Confederation of Australian Motor Sport as an Australian National Title. The title, which was the 20th Australian Sports Car Championship, was contested over a four-round series. As of 2025 this was the final Australian Sports Car Championship.

The championship was won by Alan Nolan driving a Nola Chevrolet.

== Calendar ==
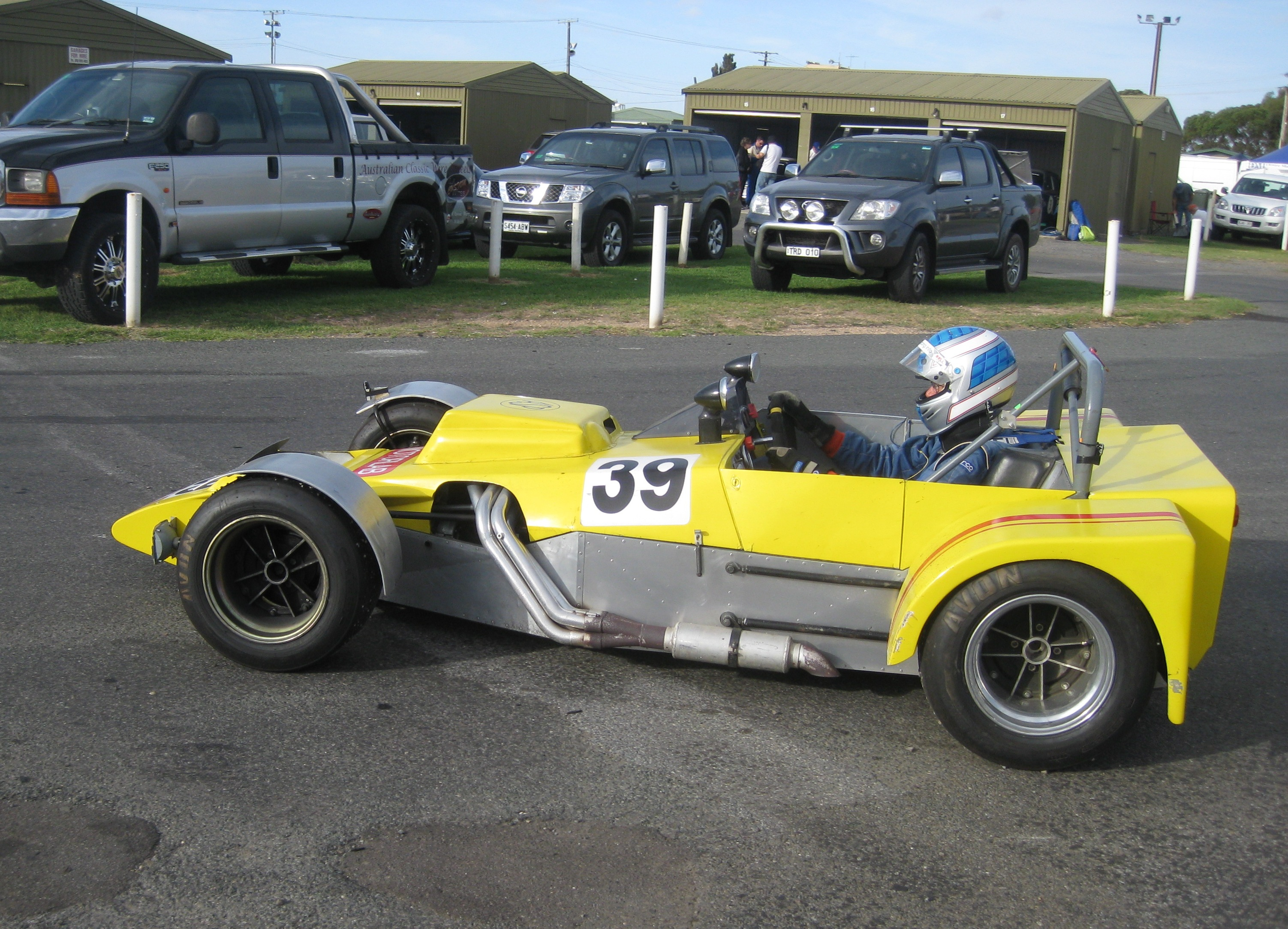
Jim Doig (ASP) placed 18th in the championship. Driver and car are pictured in 2016.

The championship was contested over a four-round series with one race per round.

Round	Circuit	State	Date	Winning driver	Winning car
1	Adelaide International Raceway	South Australia	1 May	Brian Smith	Alfa Romeo Alfetta GTV Chevrolet
2	Amaroo Park	New South Wales	31 July	Ray Hanger	Rennmax Ford BDA
3	Oran Park	New South Wales	28 August	Chris Clearihan	Kaditcha Chevrolet
4	Sandown Park	Victoria	11 September	Chris Clearihan	Kaditcha Chevrolet

A fifth round, scheduled to be held at Calder Park, did not take place.

== Classes ==
Competing cars were classified into one of three engine displacement classes:

- Up to 1.6 litres
- 1.6 to 3 litres
- Over 3 litres

== Points system ==
Championship points were awarded on a three tier system to the first twenty finishers in each round.

Outright Position	1	2	3	4	5	6	7	8	9	10	11	12	13	14	15	16	17	18	19	20
Points for Up to 1.6 litre class cars	30	27	24	21	19	17	15	14	13	12	11	10	9	8	7	6	5	4	3	2
Points for 1.6 to 3 litre class cars	28	26	23	20	17	15	14	13	12	11	10	9	8	7	6	5	4	3	2	1
Points for Over 3 litre class cars	25	23	20	17	15	13	11	10	9	8	7	6	5	4	3	2	1	-	-	-

== Results ==
Position	Driver	No.	Car	Entrant	Class	Adelaide	Amaroo	Oran Pk.	Sandown	Total
1	Alan Nolan	12 & 2	Nola Chevrolet	Alan Nolan	C	-	20	23	23	66
2	Ray Hanger	8	Rennmax Ford BDA	Ray Hanger	B & A	17	28	-	13	58
3	Chris Clearihan	12	Kaditcha Chevrolet		C	-	-	25	25	50
4	Andy Roberts	1	Roberts SR3 Ford BDA	Andy Roberts	A	24	-	-	23	47
5	Bruce Durbin	53	DT Nissan	Bruce Durbin	A	-	-	24	15	39
6	Chris Hones	56	Porsche 911E; Porsche Carrera	Chris Hones	B	-	15	15	8	38
7	John Bishop	7	Panther Clubman	John Bishop	A	-	21	15	-	36
8	Ric Kemp	14	Farrell	Ric Kemp	A	-	-	19	14	33
9	Alan Conyingham	9	Hossack T4 Holden	Alan Conyingham	C	-	11	17	-	28
10	Russell Green		Piper Arturo Ford		A	-	27	-	-	27
11	Conrad Whitlock	77	Auscam Mazda	Conrad Whitlock	B	-	17	-	10	27
12	Brian Smith	3	Alfa Romeo Alfetta GTV Chevrolet	Basil Ricciardello	C	25	-	-	-	25
13	Garry Scott	18	Jaguar XJ-S	MG Trenoweth	C	23	-	-	-	23
14	Max Engellenner	17	Kaditcha 2.6	Max Engellenner	B	20	-	-	-	20
15	Grant Taylor	22	Galloway Clubman	Grant Taylor	A	-	-	-	19	19
16	Mike Monterosso	2	Ford Escort	Mike Monterosso	B	17	-	-	-	17
=	John Pollard	9	Porsche 935 Turbo		C	-	-	-	17	17
18	Jim Doig	39	Asp Toyota 1.6	Jim Doig	A	15	-	-	-	15
19	Lance Ridgeway	47	Norax Mazda	Lance Ridgeway	B	-	-	14	-	14
20	Chris Ahyee	91	Sirch SC2T Renault Turbo	Chris Ahyee	B	-	13	-	-	13
=	John Clinton	6	JWS	John Clinton	C	-	-	-	13	13
22	Peter Heraud		Farrell		A	-	-	-	12	12
23	Mark O'Connell	23	Farrell Clubman	ME O'Connell	A	11	-	-	-	11
24	James Rosenberg	34	Holden Torana	James Rosenberg	C	10	-	-	-	10
=	Colin Memery	27	Allison Clubman Mk.1	Colin Memery	A	-	-	-	10	10
26	Jim Myhill	64	Mazda RX-7	Jim Myhill	B	9	-	-	-	9
=	Mark Podlewski	15	Holden Torana	Mark Podlewski	C	9	-	-	-	9
28	M. Bennett	55	Asp 340C	M. R. Bennett	A	8	-	-	-	8
=	Tom Hutchinson		Triumph GT6		B	8	-	-	-	8
=	Tony Ross	08	Holden 48/215 V8	Tony Ross	C	8	-	-	-	8
=	Peter Ferguson		Nambule		A	-	-	-	8	8
32	Bob Collinson	29	Asp Clubman	Bob Collinson	A	7	-	-	-	7
33	Allan Fielding		Datsun 240Z		B	-	-	-	6	6
34	Steve Newings		Datsun 240Z		B	-	-	-	5	5
=	Brian Randall	33	Norax Mazda	Brian Randall	B	5	-	-	-	5
