= John Bowe (racing driver) =

Australian racing driver (born 1954)

John Bowe AM
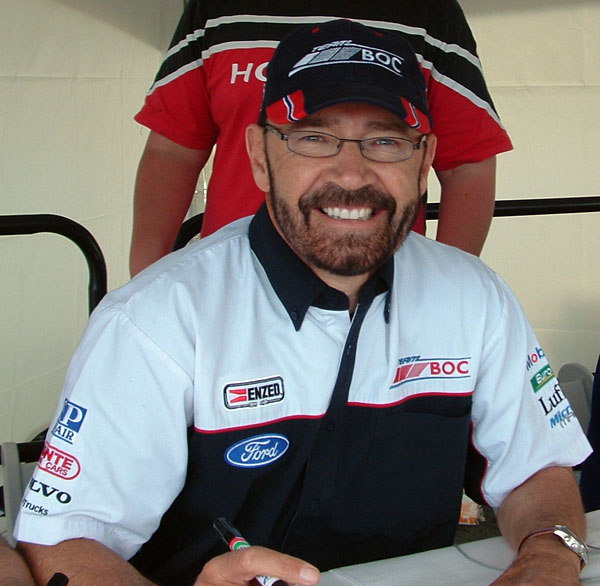
- Bowe in 2005
- Nationality: Australian
- Born: John Philip Bowe; 16 April 1954 (age 72) Devonport, Tasmania, Australia

Touring Car Masters career
- Debut season: 2008
- Current team: John Bowe Racing
- Categorisation: FIA Bronze
- Car number: 18
- Former teams: Sunliner RV
- Starts: 289
- Wins: 101
- Best finish: 1st in 2012, 2014, 2015, 2016 & 2021

Previous series
- 1978–85 1979–81 1986–87 1986–2007 1996–1998, 2001 2002–03 2007–08, 2011: Australian Drivers' Champ. Australian Formula 2 Aust. Sports Car Champ; V8 Supercars; Aust. GT Production; Nations Cup; Aust. GT Champ

Championship titles
- 1971 1972 1984 1985 1986 1989 1994 1995 2010 2012 2014–2016 2021: Tasmania Formula Vee; Tasmania Formula Ford; Australian Drivers' Champ. Australian Drivers' Champ. Aust. Sports Car Champ; Bathurst 1000; Bathurst 1000; Aust. Touring Car Champ; Touring Car Masters; Touring Car Masters; Touring Car Masters; Touring Car Masters

John Philip Bowe AM (born 16 April 1954) is an Australian racing driver, presently racing a BMW M4 in the GT4 Australia series.

Bowe is a multiple Australian Champion, having twice won the Australian Drivers' Championship during the Formula Mondial era and the Australian Sports Car Championship, before winning the Australian Touring Car Championship in 1995. He has also won the prestigious Bathurst 1000 touring car endurance race twice, in 1989 and 1994. Both wins were as co-driver with longtime friend and teammate Dick Johnson driving for Dick Johnson Racing.

== Racing cars ==
Bowe began racing at the age of sixteen in an Elfin 500 Formula Vee in 1971, winning the Tasmanian state title on debut. The following year, he also won the Tasmanian Formula Ford title.

After graduating from domestic Formula Ford racing, Bowe moved into the Australian Drivers Championship in the late 1970s, racing Elfin Formula 5000s for the most prestigious team of the era, the factory Ansett Team Elfin run by Elfin Sports Cars founder and chief designer Garrie Cooper. The pinnacle of his Formula 5000 career was finishing runner up in the 1979 Australian Grand Prix driving one of Cooper's Chevrolet V8 powered Elfin MR8s. In the same year, he also came second in the Australian Formula 2 Championship.

Bowe would finish third in the 1980 Australian Drivers' Championship driving the MR8, and would finish fourth in the Formula 2 title. He would finish fourth in 1981 driving the Elfin MR9, the only Ground effects F5000 ever built. He also dropped to ninth place in the Formula 2 championship driving an Elfin Two-25 Volkswagen.

After playing second fiddle to Alfredo Costanzo for several seasons, Bowe broke through for his first Australian Drivers' Championship in 1984, backing it up the following year with his second title in his Ford powered Ralt RT4 for Chris Leach. The 1984 and 1985 championships were run under Formula Mondial regulations.

Bowe qualified on the front row for the 1984 Australian Grand Prix at Calder Park in Melbourne and led the race for the first 18 laps before a loose spark plug lead caused the 4 cyl Ford engine to misfire and he was passed by defending race winner Roberto Moreno of Brazil who went on to win the race. Bowe finally stopped on lap 33 and rejoined in 13th place. He would fight his way back to sixth place by the end of the race (two laps down), setting the third fastest race lap behind Moreno's Ralt and the similar car of Formula One driver Andrea de Cesaris.

Bowe's last open wheeler race was in the Formula Mondial support race at the 1986 Australian Grand Prix in Adelaide. Driving a Ralt RT4 in the race (for the first time in 12 months), Bowe equalled the category lap record for the Adelaide Street Circuit set one year earlier by American driver Ross Cheever, the younger brother of Formula One driver Eddie Cheever. Bowe's time of 1:33.20 for the 3.780 km (2.362 mi) track compared to the fastest Formula One race lap of the circuit that year of 1:20.78 set by Nelson Piquet driving a 1,000 bhp (746 kW; 1,014 PS) turbocharged Williams-Honda.

Bowe was appointed a Member of the Order of Australia for "significant service to motorsport as a touring car driver" in the 2021 Queen's Birthday Honours.

== Sports cars ==
John Bowe drove the Bryan Thompson–owned Mercedes-Benz 450 SLC-Chevrolet twin-turbo in Sports Sedan and GT events during the early 1980s when Thompson was in retirement, which stopped when Thompson came out of retirement in 1983. The Mercedes with its 4.2-litre Chevrolet engine put out a reported 1,100 bhp (820 kW; 1,115 PS), but was somewhat unreliable due to the use of smaller turbo's.

In 1985 while still contesting the Australian drivers' Championship, Bowe was approached by Adelaide-based photographer and Sports Car racer Bernie Van Elsen to race his new car for the Australian Sports Car Championship (ASCC). The car, built by K&A Engineering in Adelaide and called a Veskanda C1, was initially powered by an F5000 sourced 5.0-litre Chevrolet V8, though this was changed to a 5.8-litre (350 cui) Chevrolet V8 in 1986 when CAMS increased the engine capacity limit for Group A Sports Cars from 5000 cc to 6000 cc. The Veskanda is generally regarded as the fastest Sports Car ever designed and built in Australia. In Bowe's hands, the Veskanda Chev easily won the 1986 Australian Sports Car Championship, with the Bowe setting outright lap records (often faster than the open wheelers) at circuits around the country. Two of these records will stand forever as the tracks are now closed: Amaroo Park in Sydney (set in 1987, track closed in 1998), and the Surfers Paradise International Raceway (set in 1986, track closed in late 1987).

Bowe and the Veskanda finished second in the three round 1987 ASCC after engine reliability troubles saw him retire from the first race at a very wet Calder Park in Melbourne. He then easily won the final two rounds at Amaroo and Sandown Park to finish nineteen points behind Andy Roberts in his self-designed Roberts SR3. Following the season the car was parked as Bowe was moving full-time into Touring Car Racing in 1988.

Van Elsen entered the Veskanda in the Sandown 360 which was a round of that year's 1988 World Sports-Prototype Championship. Bowe teamed with his Touring Car team owner and teammate Dick Johnson in the Veskanda (the 5.8 litre V8 was replaced for the meeting by a 6.0 litre Chevrolet V8). After qualifying a credible eighth with a time of 1:35.510 (compared to Jean Louis Schlesser's pole time of 1:28.620 in his Sauber C9), the pair completed 87 laps, six less than the winning Sauber C9 of Schlesser and Jochen Mass. Unlike the 1984 World Sportscar Championship race when Australian sports cars, GT and sports sedans had been permitted to compete in a special class by the FIA, Australian cars were not eligible for the 1988 event. However, although the Veskanda had been built to comply with CAMS Group A rules, it had also been built to the FIA's Group C sports car rules and was thus free to enter and race.

Ultimately, the Bowe / Johnson Veskanda, the only Australian car in the 18 car field, was disqualified for using more fuel than the rules allowed.

== Touring cars ==
Bowe's two CAMS Gold Stars in 1984 and 1985 saw him finally get the attention of the Australian touring car establishment. In mid-1985, he was contacted by New Zealander Mark Petch to join the Mark Petch Motorsport Volvo 240 Turbo team during the 1985 Australian Endurance Championship. Bowe co-drove with the team's lead driver Robbie Francevic at the Sandown 500 and the Bathurst 1000. They were a DNF at Sandown after the differential in the Volvo locked solid underneath Bowe at the entrance to the pits on lap 60 (the car had to be pushed into the pits with the rear end supported by a trolley jack). At Bathurst, the turbocharged Volvo was considered the only car capable of matching the speed of the three V12 Jaguar XJS' run by Tom Walkinshaw Racing. The Volvo qualified fifth fastest after Hardie's Heroes (set by Francevic), and after running second and third in the early laps, was destined to spend time in the pits having the alternator replaced, losing many laps. The car failed to finish after running out of fuel on lap 122. Despite it being only the second time he had driven the Volvo, and not having previously driven at the Mount Panorama Circuit, Bowe proved to be as quick in the car at Bathurst as Francevic until late in the final qualifying session when the team put on a set of qualifying tyres and Francevic set the third fastest time.

During the 1986 Australian Touring Car Championship, the new factory-supported Volvo Dealer Team replaced the Mark Petch Motorsport outfit and expanded to a second car and Bowe joined Francevic in the team full-time at round four. Bowe proved he could match it with the likes of Francevic, Peter Brock, Dick Johnson, George Fury and Jim Richards by qualifying on pole and easily leading the fifth round of the championship at Wanneroo in Perth until the new Volvo's engine went off song and forced him to retire. Francevic went on to win the championship, with Bowe taking eighth place in the series including a pair of third places at Calder Park and also at Oran Park in Sydney. Also in 1986, Bowe raced the Veskanda-Chevrolet Sports car owned by Bernie van Elsen and used it to dominate the Australian Sports Car Championship, along the way setting outright lap records at various tracks around the country.

Bowe became the lead driver of the Volvo team after Francevic was fired from the team shortly by team boss John Sheppard after his refusal to drive a newly built car at the 1986 Castrol 500 (he was also fired for comments made to the media on race morning which Francevic claimed was aimed at the race officials, but Sheppard took as criticising the team). Once again though, the Volvo proved fragile and unable to effectively threaten for the 1986 endurance races, though Bowe was able to qualify the Volvo in fifth place for the 1986 Bathurst 1000. The team closed at the end of the season leaving Bowe without a drive for the 1987 season.

He was picked up by the Peter Jackson Nissan Racing team for the 1987 endurance season, mainly as a co-driver with young sensation Glenn Seton. The pair finished fourth at Bathurst in the Nissan Skyline RS DR30, and were later promoted to second after the disqualification of the Texaco Eggenberger Ford team. Although the Nissan's won a number of touring car races in Australia during 1986 and 1987, Bowe would later claim both privately and publicly that the turbocharged 4 cyl DR30 Skyline (which had no aerodynamic aids making it very unstable at high speed) was the worst touring car he ever raced, thoughts that were echoed by regular Nissan drivers Seton and George Fury.

Bowe's first major touring car win came in the 1987 Yokohama/Bob Jane T-Marts 300 at the Calder Park Raceway. The race was run on the rarely used combined circuit which incorporated both the 1986 redeveloped road course and the newly completed NASCAR-style "Thunderdome" oval. Bowe and Sydney driver Terry Shiel won the race, the first on the combined course, driving the Peter Jackson team's spare Nissan Skyline RS DR30 from the Holden VL Commodore SS Group A of Bowe's former open wheel rival Larry Perkins, and the Commodore's owner Bill O'Brien. As of 2016 this is believed to be the only touring car victory for a Japanese car on the high-banked Thunderdome.

For 1988, Dick Johnson Racing hired Bowe, replacing Gregg Hansford as the team's number two driver in their Ford Sierra RS500's. Team manager Neal Lowe had completely re-engineered the cars after an embarrassing 1987 endurance season and the Shell backed cars proved to be the class of the field. Bowe won his third race for the team, his first ever ATCC race win, at Winton and would go on to win again at Amaroo Park, finishing second in the 1988 ATCC behind team boss Dick Johnson. The pair salvaged a runner up position at Bathurst in the team's third entry (Bowe's ATCC Sierra) after their two primary cars failed early in the race. After Johnson and Bowe's Sierra's failed, they moved into the No. 18 car which had at that stage been driven by one of Bowe's former open wheel rivals John Smith (another open wheel rival, Alfredo Costanzo, was to be Smith's co-driver but didn't get to drive at Bathurst after Dick and John swapped cars).

After the 1988 ATCC, DJR took one Dick's championship winning Sierra to the Silverstone Circuit to contest the RAC Tourist Trophy. DJR proved they had the fastest Group A Sierra's in the world when Dick Johnson easily won the pole by just under half a second against the best European and British opposition. Johnson and Bowe led the race early on and were pulling away from the Eggenberger and Andy Rouse Sierra's, with Johnson setting the circuits Group A lap record, until the water pump in the car failed and had to be replaced. Rouse would go on to win the race, with the DJR Sierra eventually finishing 21st.

The 1989 ATCC would prove to be more of the same for Bowe, again finishing runner up to Johnson after taking victories at Amaroo Park and Wanneroo. The 1989 Tooheys 1000 at Bathurst was a triumph for Bowe and Johnson, seeing off all challengers on their way to victory, including the Eggenberger built and engineered Allan Moffat Sierra's driven by European aces Klaus Niedzwiedz and Frank Biela, as well as Peter Brock's Rouse built Sierra (with Rouse himself co-driving) which Brock had put on pole position. With the Shell Sierra limping due to failing turbo boost, Bowe drove the car over the finish line at Bathurst, saying to Channel 7 commentator Mike Raymond "Fancy doing that" over racecam as he did so.

Over the next three seasons his 1987 team Nissan, now running the formidable 4WD, twin-turbo Nissan GT-R, surged to the fore-front of Australian Touring Car racing and Bowe's only win would come at the Sandown round of the 1992 Australian Touring Car Championship. Bowe would then go on to finish second with Johnson in the now ageing Sierra at the crash shortened 1992 Tooheys 1000.

== V8Supercar ==
Supercars Championship career
- Championships: 1 (1995)
- Races: 469
- Wins: 31
- Podiums: 92
- Pole positions: 23

DJR fortunes reversed in 1993 with the advent of the V8 based regulations that in 1997 would become known as V8 Supercar. The team's new Ford Falcon V8s returned to the front with Bowe winning the first round under the new regulations at Amaroo Park. Bowe would narrowly miss out on second place in the championship. For the 1994 season DJR was initially off the pace until the Sandown 500 where in a race of mixed fortunes Bowe and Johnson won, taking the team's first Sandown 500 win after over 15 years of disappointment. Four weeks later in one of the most dramatic Bathurst 1000s of all time Bowe and Johnson held off a pursuing pack of five Holdens late in the race to win, with Bowe memorably fighting for the lead with teenage debutante Craig Lowndes in the final laps.

The team continued their good form into 1995 where not even the destruction of tyre suppliers Dunlop factory in the Kobe earthquake could stop Bowe from winning the 1995 Australian Touring Car Championship, taking victories at Symmons Plains, a sprint round held at Bathurst for the first time since 1972, Winton and under terrific pressure from Glenn Seton and Peter Brock, the championship finale at Oran Park. The team went on to win back-to-back Sandown 500s but didn't finish at Bathurst after an accident with Glenn Seton while leading stopped their run on lap 110.

Bowe continued to race for DJR for the next three seasons, taking a second sprint victory at Bathurst in 1996, Lakeside in 1997 and Winton in 1998, the last of his 15 Touring Car round victories. Bowe also finished runner up in the 1996 Australian Touring Car Championship and Bathurst 1000 to his young rival from two years prior, Craig Lowndes.

Bowe moved on to Caterpillar backed West Australian team PAE Motorsport seeking a new challenge but before the season was out the team had been sold to Queensland car dealer John Briggs. Despite some early promise he was fired from the team after Bathurst in 2001 with just a single race win at Queensland Raceway in 1999 to show for his efforts.

From 2002 to 2006, Bowe and new team-mate Brad Jones had mixed fortunes. As with Briggs Motorsport, early promise faded as the team struggled to find the resources to regularly threaten the front running teams. Always a threat at Bathurst, Bowe and Jones finished third in 2004 and won the second race in the 2005 Australian Grand Prix non-championship event.

== “Retirement” ==
Announcing his retirement, Bowe raced a final season in 2007 for Paul Cruickshank Racing. In March 2007 Bowe broke the record for most championship races starts when he started in round 2 at Barbagallo, his 213th start.

In 2008, Bowe returned to Sports car racing in a Lamborghini Gallardo in the Australian GT Championship, before securing a full-time drive in 2009 with the Touring Car Masters series for historic touring cars, driving a Chevrolet Camaro. 2010 saw John Bowe returning to the Touring Car Masters category driving "Sally", his 1969 Ford Mustang (powered by a Ford 351 Windsor V8 engine), with sponsorship from WesTrac and Wilson Security. Bowe ran the number 18 on his Mustang, the same number he used when driving for Dick Johnson Racing.

Bowe's name has been lent to the John Bowe Trophy, awarded to the winner of the Formula 3 Tasmanian Super Prix.

Driving a Ferrari 458 GT3 for Maranello Motorsport alongside Craig Lowndes, Peter Edwards, and former Formula One driver Mika Salo, Bowe was the winner of the 2014 Bathurst 12 Hour on 9 February. It was his third success in the race after winning at Eastern Creek in 1995 and at Bathurst in 2010.

Bowe continued to race Touring Car Masters successfully throughout the 2010s and early 2020s, winning five championships and winning a race in his last full season in the category in 2023. In 2024 he raced in GT4 Australia, officially finishing second in the amateur cup behind co-driver Jacob Lawrence (Bowe being classed as an amateur due to his age).

== Career results ==
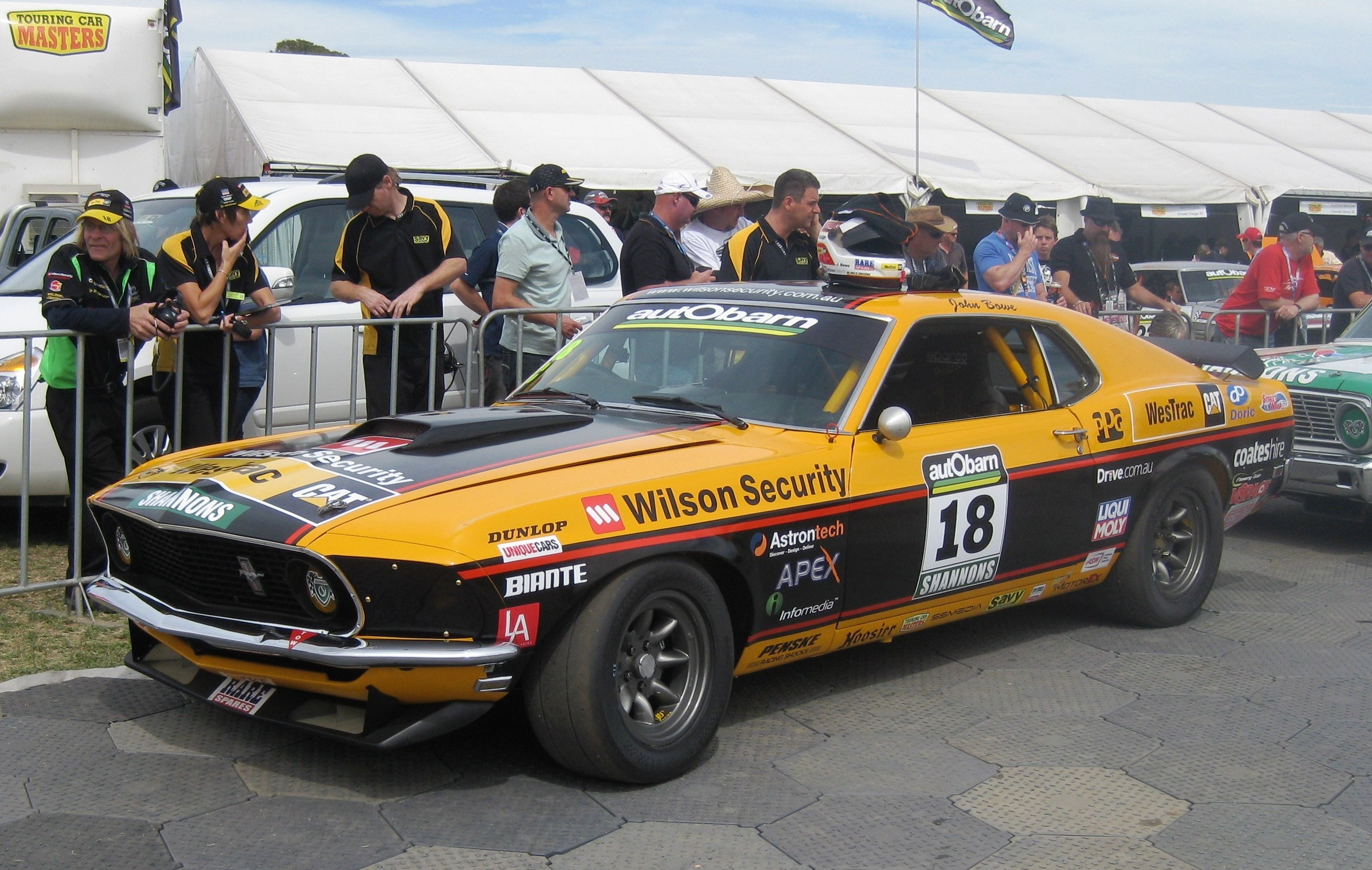
The 1969 Ford Mustang of John Bowe – 2011 Touring Car Masters

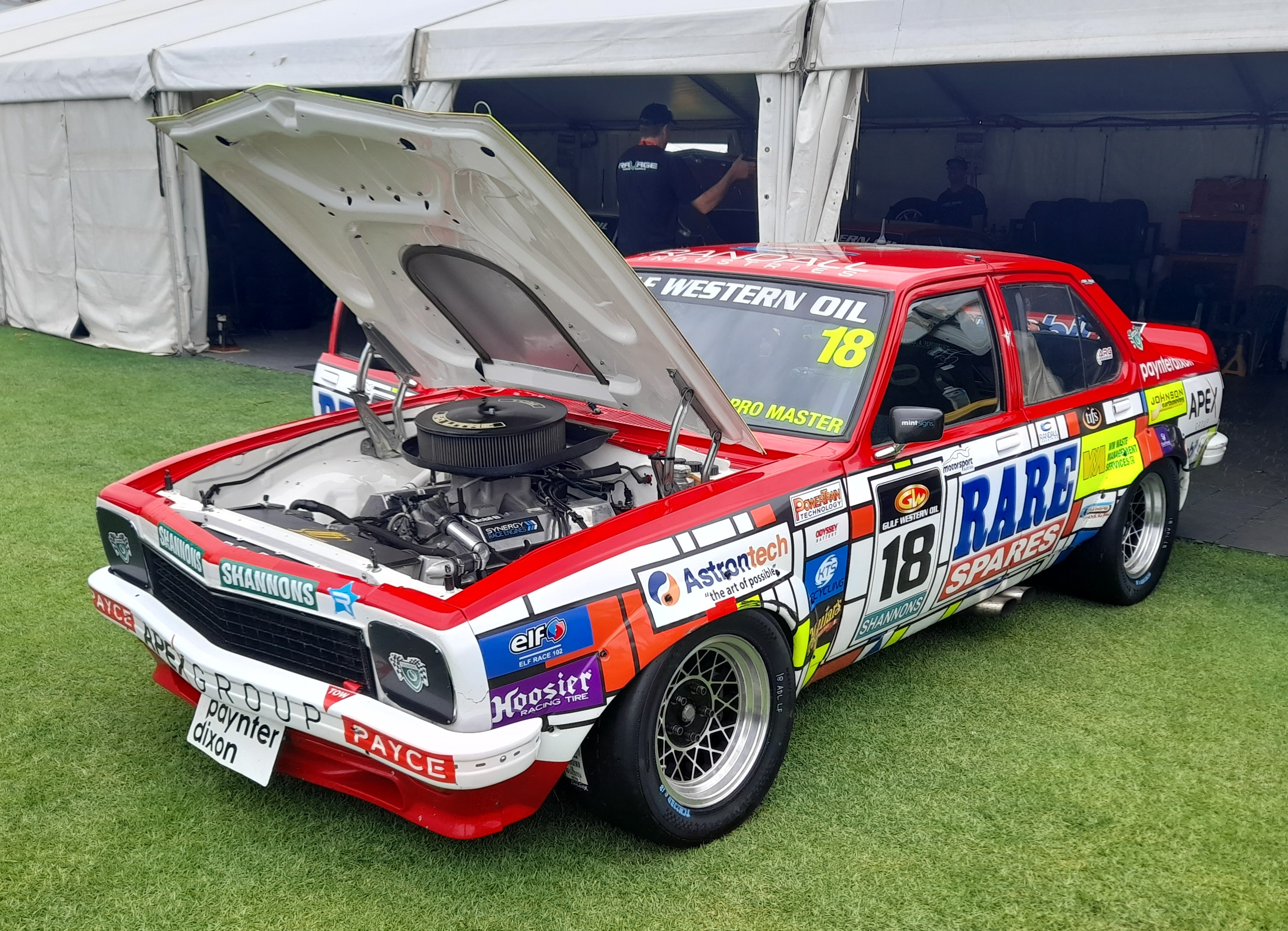
Bowe placed sixth in the 2023 Touring Car Masters driving a Holden Torana SL/R 5000

Season	Series	Position	Car	Team
1978	Australian Drivers' Championship	10th	Elfin MR8 Chevrolet	Ansett Team Elfin
1979	Australian Drivers' Championship	2nd	Elfin MR8 Chevrolet	Ansett Team Elfin
1979	Australian Formula 2 Championship	2nd	Elfin 792 Volkswagen	Ansett Team Elfin
1980	Australian Drivers' Championship	3rd	Elfin MR8 Chevrolet	Ansett Team Elfin
1980	Australian Formula 2 Championship	4th	Elfin Two-25 Volkswagen	Ansett Team Elfin
1981	Australian Drivers' Championship	4th	Elfin MR9 Chevrolet	Ansett Team Elfin
1981	Australian Formula 2 Championship	9th	Elfin Two-25 Volkswagen	Chris Leach Racing
1982	Australian Drivers' Championship	2nd	Ralt RT4 Ford	Chris Leach Racing
1982	National Panasonic Series	=4th	Ralt RT4 Ford	Chris Leach Racing
1983	Australian Drivers' Championship	6th	Ralt RT4 Ford	Chris Leach Racing
1984	Australian Drivers' Championship	1st	Ralt RT4 Ford	Chris Leach Racing
1985	Australian Drivers' Championship	1st	Ralt RT4 Ford	Chris Leach Enterprises
1985	Australian Sports Car Championship	NC	Veskanda C1 Chevrolet	Bernie van Elsen
1985	Australian Endurance Championship	NC	Volvo 240T	Mark Petch Motorsport
1986	Australian Touring Car Championship	8th	Volvo 240T	Volvo Dealer Team
1986	Australian Sports Car Championship	1st	Veskanda C1 Chevrolet	Bernie van Elsen
1986	Australian Endurance Championship	NC	Volvo 240T	Volvo Dealer Team
1987	Australian Sports Car Championship	2nd	Veskanda C1 Chevrolet	Bernie van Elsen
1988	Australian Touring Car Championship	2nd	Ford Sierra RS500	Shell Ultra Hi Racing
1988	European Touring Car Championship	NC	Ford Sierra RS500	Redkote Racing
1988	Asia-Pacific Touring Car Championship	NC	Ford Sierra RS500	Shell Ultra Hi Racing
1988	World Sports Prototype Championship	NC	Veskanda C1 Chevrolet	Bernie van Elsen
1989	Australian Touring Car Championship	2nd	Ford Sierra RS500	Shell Ultra Hi Racing
1990	Australian Touring Car Championship	5th	Ford Sierra RS500	Shell Ultra Hi Racing
1990	Australian Endurance Championship	NC	Ford Sierra RS500	Shell Ultra Hi Racing
1991	Australian Touring Car Championship	7th	Ford Sierra RS500	Shell Ultra Hi Racing
1991	Australian Endurance Championship	NC	Ford Sierra RS500	Shell Ultra Hi Racing
1992	Australian Touring Car Championship	4th	Ford Sierra RS500	Shell Ultra Hi Racing
1993	Australian Touring Car Championship	3rd	Ford EB Falcon	Shell Racing
1994	Australian Touring Car Championship	6th	Ford EB Falcon	Shell FAI Racing
1995	Australian Touring Car Championship	1st	Ford EF Falcon	Shell FAI Racing
1995	Australian GT Production Car Series	16th	Mazda RX-7	
1996	Australian Touring Car Championship	2nd	Ford EF Falcon	Shell FAI Racing
1996	Australian GT Production Car Championship	5th	Ferrari F355 Challenge	Ross Palmer Motorsport
1997	Australian Touring Car Championship	2nd	Ford EL Falcon	Shell Helix Racing
1997	Australian GT Production Car Championship	2nd	Ferrari F355 Challenge	Ross Palmer Motorsport
1998	Australian Touring Car Championship	5th	Ford EL Falcon	Shell Helix Racing
1998	Australian GT Production Car Championship	5th	Ferrari F355 Challenge	Ross Palmer Motorsport
1999	Shell Championship Series	13th	Ford AU Falcon	PAE Motorsport
2000	Shell Championship Series	16th	Ford AU Falcon	Briggs Motor Sport
2001	Shell Championship Series	22nd	Ford AU Falcon	Briggs Motor Sport
2001	Australian GT Production Car Championship	5th	Ford Mustang Cobra RA	Prancing Horse Racing
2002	V8Supercar Championship Series	12th	Ford AU Falcon	OzEmail Racing
2002	Australian Nations Cup Championship	3rd	Ferrari 360 N-GT	Prancing Horse Racing
2003	V8Supercar Championship Series	11th	Ford BA Falcon	OzEmail Racing
2003	Australian Nations Cup Championship	2nd	Ferrari 360 N-GT; Chrysler Viper ACR; Porsche 911 GT3 RS	Prancing Horse Racing
2004	V8Supercar Championship Series	9th	Ford BA Falcon	OzEmail Racing
2005	V8Supercar Championship Series	18th	Ford BA Falcon	Team BOC
2006	V8Supercar Championship Series	23rd	Ford BA Falcon	Team BOC
2007	V8Supercar Championship Series	30th	Ford BF Falcon	Paul Cruickshank Racing
2007	Australian GT Championship	12th	Lamborghini Gallardo GT3	Team Lamborghini Australia
2008	Australian GT Championship	5th	Ferrari 360 GT; Lamborghini Gallardo GT3	Coopers www.consolidatedchem.com.au
2008	Touring Car Masters	2nd	Chevrolet Camaro	Sunliner RV
2009	Touring Car Masters (Group 1)	3rd	Chevrolet Camaro	Sunliner RV
2010	Touring Car Masters	3rd	Ford Mustang	John Bowe Racing
2011	Touring Car Masters (Class C)	1st	Ford Mustang	John Bowe Racing
2011	Australian Production Car Championship	19th	BMW 335i	GWS Personnel
2012	Australian Touring Car Masters Series (Class A)	1st	Ford Mustang	WesTrac Cat/Wilson Security
2013	Touring Car Masters	2nd	Ford Mustang	John Bowe Racing
2013	Australian GT Championship	4th	Ferrari 458 GT3	Maranello Motorsport
2013	Australian Production Car Championship	23rd	BMW 335i	GWS Motorsport
2014	Australian GT Championship	3rd	Ferrari 458 Italia	IL Bello Rosso
2014	Touring Car Masters (ProMasters class)	1st	Ford Mustang	Dunlop Super Dealers/Wilson Security
2015	Australian GT Championship	36th	Bentley Continental	Flying B Racing
2015	Touring Car Masters (ProMasters class)	1st	Ford Mustang; Holden Torana SL/R 5000	Dunlop Super Dealers / Wilson Security
2023	Touring Car Masters	6th	Holden Torana SL/R 5000	Rare Spares / PAYNTER DIXON

=== Complete Australian Touring Car Championship results ===
(key) (Races in bold indicate pole position) (Races in italics indicate fastest lap)

Year	Team	Car	1	2	3	4	5	6	7	8	9	10	11	12	13	14	15	16	17	18	19	20	21	22	23	24	25	26	27	28	29	30	31	32	33	34	35	36	37	38	39	DC	Points
1986	Volvo Dealer Team	Volvo 240T	AMA; R1	SYM; R2	SAN; R3	AIR; R4; 4	WAN; R5; Ret	SUR; R6; 9	CAL; R7; 3	LAK; R8; DNS	WIN; R9; 4	ORA; R10; 3																														8th	98
1987	Peter Jackson Nissan Racing	Nissan Skyline DR30 RS	CAL; R1	SYM; R2	LAK; R3	BAR; R4	ADE; R5	SUR; R6	SAN; R7	AMA; R8	ORA; R9; Ret																															NC	0
1988	Dick Johnson Racing	Ford Sierra RS Cosworth	CAL; R1; Ret	SYM; R2; 2	WIN; R3; 1	WAN; R4; 3	AIR; R5; 2	LAK; R6; Ret	SAN; R7; 2	AMA; R8; 1	ORA; R9; 2																															2nd	112
1989	Dick Johnson Racing	Ford Sierra RS Cosworth	AMA; R1; 1	SYM; R2; 3	LAK; R3; 3	WAN; R4; 1	MAL; R5; 3	SAN; R6; 3	WIN; R7; 8	ORA; R8; 3																																2nd	94
1990	Dick Johnson Racing	Ford Sierra RS Cosworth	AMA; R1; 2	SYM; R2; 3	PHI; R3; 2	WIN; R4; 6	LAK; R5; 4	MAL; R6; 14	BAR; R7; 6	ORA; R8; 5																																5th	72
1991	Dick Johnson Racing	Ford Sierra RS Cosworth	SAN; R1; 3	SYM; R2; 11	WAN; R3; 8	LAK; R4; 10	WIN; R5; 7	AMA; R6; 4	MAL; R7; 7	LAK; R8; Ret	ORA; R9; Ret																															7th	34
1992	Dick Johnson Racing	Ford Sierra RS Cosworth	AMA; R1; 6	AMA; R2; 10	SAN; R3; 1	**SAN**; **R4**; **1**	SYM; R5; Ret	SYM; R6; DNS	WIN; R7; 13	WIN; R8; 5	LAK; R9; 9	**LAK**; **R10**; **3**	EAS; R11; 1	**EAS**; **R12**; **1**	**MAL**; **R13**; **5**	MAL; R14; 5	**BAR**; **R15**; **1**	**BAR**; **R16**; **1**	**ORA**; **R17**; **15**	ORA; R18; 5																						4th	175
1993	Dick Johnson Racing	Ford EB Falcon	AMA; R1; 4	AMA; R2; 1	SYM; R3; 7	SYM; R4; 3	PHI; R5; 2	PHI; R6; 3	LAK; R7; 4	LAK; R8; 3	WIN; R9; DSQ	WIN; R10; 7	**EAS**; **R11**; **2**	EAS; R12; 3	MAL; R13; 5	MAL; R14; 3	BAR; R15; 4	BAR; R16; Ret	ORA; R17; 2	ORA; R18; 8																						3rd	140
1994	Dick Johnson Racing	Ford EB Falcon	AMA; R1; 3	AMA; R2; 9	**SAN**; **R3**; **18**	SAN; R4; 5	SYM; R5; 3	SYM; R6; Ret	PHI; R7; 9	PHI; R8; 4	LAK; R9; Ret	LAK; R10; 6	WIN; R11; 5	WIN; R12; 6	EAS; R13; 10	EAS; R14; 6	MAL; R15; 8	MAL; R16; Ret	BAR; R17; 5	BAR; R18; 3	ORA; R19; 4	ORA; R20; 6																				7th	156
1995	Dick Johnson Racing	Ford EF Falcon	**SAN**; **R1**; **5**	SAN; R2; 1	**SYM**; **R3**; **1**	**SYM**; **R4**; **2**	**BAT**; **R5**; **2**	BAT; R6; 2	PHI; R7; 6	PHI; R8; 4	**LAK**; **R9**; **1**	**LAK**; **R10**; **3**	**WIN**; **R11**; **1**	**WIN**; **R12**; **1**	**EAS**; **R13**; **6**	EAS; R14; 4	**MAL**; **R15**; **3**	MAL; R16; 3	BAR; R17; 5	BAR; R18; 7	**ORA**; **R19**; **1**	**ORA**; **R20**; **1**																				1st	314
1996	Dick Johnson Racing	Ford EF Falcon	**EAS**; **R1**; **1**	**EAS**; **R2**; **4**	EAS; R3; Ret	**SAN**; **R4**; **2**	SAN; R5; 1	**SAN**; **R6**; **8**	**BAT**; **R7**; **1**	**BAT**; **R8**; **1**	**BAT**; **R9**; **1**	SYM; R10; 3	SYM; R11; 5	SYM; R12; 4	PHI; R13; 3	PHI; R14; Ret	PHI; R15; 3	CAL; R16; 3	CAL; R17; 2	CAL; R18; 4	LAK; R19; 5	LAK; R20; 5	LAK; R21; 3	BAR; R22; 6	BAR; R23; 5	BAR; R24; 7	**MAL**; **R25**; **2**	MAL; R26; 2	MAL; R27; Ret	ORA; R28; 5	ORA; R29; 5	ORA; R30; 5										2nd	344
1997	Dick Johnson Racing	Ford EL Falcon	CAL; R1; 10	CAL; R2; 6	CAL; R3; 4	PHI; R4; 5	PHI; R5; 5	PHI; R6; 4	SAN; R7; 2	SAN; R8; 2	SAN; R9; 2	SYM; R10; 7	SYM; R11; 8	SYM; R12; 5	WIN; R13; 5	WIN; R14; 5	WIN; R15; 4	EAS; R16; 3	EAS; R17; 2	EAS; R18; 2	**LAK**; **R19**; **2**	LAK; R20; 1	**LAK**; **R21**; **2**	BAR; R22; 2	BAR; R23; 1	**BAR**; **R24**; **11**	MAL; R25; 4	MAL; R26; 4	MAL; R27; 3	ORA; R28; 7	ORA; R29; Ret	ORA; R30; DNS										2nd	608
1998	Dick Johnson Racing	Ford EL Falcon	**SAN**; **R1**; **1**	**SAN**; **R2**; **2**	SAN; R3; 4	SYM; R4; Ret	SYM; R5; 7	SYM; R6; 11	**LAK**; **R7**; **1**	**LAK**; **R8**; **Ret**	LAK; R9; 8	PHI; R10; 6	PHI; R11; 5	PHI; R12; 3	WIN; R13; 2	WIN; R14; 1	**WIN**; **R15**; **1**	MAL; R16; 1	**MAL**; **R17**; **11**	MAL; R18; 9	BAR; R19; 16	BAR; R20; Ret	BAR; R21; 12	CAL; R22; 7	CAL; R23; 7	CAL; R24; C	HDV; R25; 7	HDV; R26; DSQ	HDV; R27; 7	ORA; R28; 16	ORA; R29; 10	ORA; R30; 9										5th	684
1999	PAE Motorsport	Ford AU Falcon	EAS; R1; 12	EAS; R2; Ret	EAS; R3; DNS	ADE; R4; 11	BAR; R5; 8	BAR; R6; Ret	BAR; R7; 14	PHI; R8; 9	PHI; R9; 7	PHI; R10; 5	HDV; R11; 10	HDV; R12; 5	HDV; R13; 3	SAN; R14; 3	SAN; R15; Ret	SAN; R16; 16	**QLD**; **R17**; **11**	QLD; R18; 7	QLD; R19; 1	CAL; R20; 7	CAL; R21; 3	CAL; R22; 3	SYM; R23; 16	SYM; R24; 9	SYM; R25; 5	WIN; R26; Ret	WIN; R27; 12	WIN; R28; 8	ORA; R29; 11	ORA; R30; 8	ORA; R31; 12	QLD; R32; 18	BAT; R33; Ret							13th	1078
2000	Briggs Motorsport	Ford AU Falcon	PHI; R1; 13	PHI; R2; 19	BAR; R3; Ret	BAR; R4; 22	BAR; R5; 23	ADE; R6; 12	ADE; R7; 4	EAS; R8; 7	EAS; R9; 6	EAS; R10; 5	HDV; R11; 21	HDV; R12; 18	HDV; R13; Ret	CAN; R14; Ret	CAN; R15; 17	CAN; R16; 11	QLD; R17; Ret	QLD; R18; 15	QLD; R19; 10	WIN; R20; 9	WIN; R21; 7	WIN; R22; Ret	ORA; R23; 13	ORA; R24; 25	ORA; R25; 14	CAL; R26; 21	CAL; R27; 15	CAL; R28; 12	QLD; R29; 5	SAN; R30; 9	SAN; R31; 6	SAN; R32; 11	BAT; R33; Ret							16th	679
2001	Briggs Motorsport	Ford AU Falcon	PHI; R1; Ret	PHI; R2; 17	ADE; R3; 8	ADE; R4; Ret	EAS; R5; 4	EAS; R6; 4	HDV; R7; 29	HDV; R8; Ret	HDV; R9; 15	CAN; R10; 10	CAN; R11; 5	CAN; R12; 5	BAR; R13; 13	BAR; R14; 13	BAR; R15; 13	CAL; R16; Ret	CAL; R17; 18	CAL; R18; 13	ORA; R19; Ret	ORA; R20; 14	QLD; R21; Ret	WIN; R22; 19	WIN; R23; 13	BAT; R24; Ret	PUK; R25	PUK; R26	PUK; R27	SAN; R28	SAN; R29	SAN; R30										22nd	1270
2002	Brad Jones Racing	Ford AU Falcon	ADE; R1; 19	ADE; R2; 8	PHI; R3; 9	PHI; R4; 22	EAS; R5; 14	EAS; R6; 12	EAS; R7; 10	HDV; R8; 8	HDV; R9; 29	HDV; R10; 25	CAN; R11; 11	CAN; R12; 19	CAN; R13; 7	BAR; R14; 9	BAR; R15; 3	BAR; R16; 15	ORA; R17; Ret	ORA; R18; 12	WIN; R19; 8	WIN; R20; 11	QLD; R21; 9	BAT; R22; 16	SUR; R23; 26	SUR; R24; 15	PUK; R25; 12	PUK; R26; 20	PUK; R27; Ret	SAN; R28; 9	SAN; R29; 6											12th	779
2003	Brad Jones Racing	Ford BA Falcon	ADE; R1; Ret	ADE; R1; 23	PHI; R3; 21	EAS; R4; 30	WIN; R5; 8	BAR; R6; 30	BAR; R7; 11	BAR; R8; 11	HDV; R9; 10	HDV; R10; 10	HDV; R11; 7	QLD; R12; 7	ORA; R13; 7	SAN; R14; 4	BAT; R15; 10	SUR; R16; 14	SUR; R17; 10	PUK; R18; 12	PUK; R19; 10	PUK; R20; Ret	EAS; R21; 11	EAS; R22; 14																		11th	1478
2004	Brad Jones Racing	Ford BA Falcon	ADE; R1; 9	ADE; R2; 15	EAS; R3; 18	PUK; R4; 10	PUK; R5; 22	PUK; R6; 12	HDV; R7; 8	HDV; R8; 6	HDV; R9; 6	BAR; R10; 8	BAR; R11; 7	BAR; R12; 7	QLD; R13; Ret	WIN; R14; 18	ORA; R15; 12	ORA; R16; 18	SAN; R17; 7	BAT; R18; 3	SUR; R19; 14	SUR; R20; 16	SYM; R21; 17	SYM; R22; 14	SYM; R23; 16	EAS; R24; 21	EAS; R25; 15	EAS; R26; 12														9th	
2005	Brad Jones Racing	Ford BA Falcon	ADE; R1; 12	ADE; R2; Ret	PUK; R3; 12	PUK; R4; 10	PUK; R5; 8	BAR; R6; 15	BAR; R7; 11	BAR; R8; 8	EAS; R9; 12	EAS; R10; 8	SHA; R11; 22	SHA; R12; 15	SHA; R13; 14	HDV; R14; 10	HDV; R15; 10	HDV; R16; 12	QLD; R17; 22	ORA; R18; 20	ORA; R19; 19	SAN; R20; 9	BAT; R21; 21	SUR; R22; 16	SUR; R23; 15	SUR; R24; 17	SYM; R25; 23	SYM; R26; 28	SYM; R27; 29	PHI; R28; 23	PHI; R29; 29	PHI; R30; 27										18th	
2006	Brad Jones Racing	Ford BA Falcon	ADE; R1; 19	ADE; R2; 14	PUK; R3; 17	PUK; R4; Ret	PUK; R5; DNS	BAR; R6; 25	BAR; R7; Ret	BAR; R8; 21	WIN; R9; 23	WIN; R10; 13	WIN; R11; 19	HDV; R12; 20	HDV; R13; 13	HDV; R14; 21	QLD; R15; 27	QLD; R16; 11	QLD; R17; 23	ORA; R18; 23	ORA; R19; 23	ORA; R20; 13	SAN; R21; 5	BAT; R22; 11	SUR; R23; 16	SUR; R24; 15	SUR; R25; Ret	SYM; R26; 28	SYM; R27; 18	SYM; R28; 11	BHR; R29; 19	BHR; R30; 27	BHR; R31; 18	PHI; R32; 24	PHI; R33; 21	PHI; R34; 24						23rd	
2007	Paul Cruickshank Racing	Ford BF Falcon	ADE; R1; Ret	ADE; R2; Ret	BAR; R3; Ret	BAR; R4; 20	BAR; R5; 14	PUK; R6; 21	PUK; R7; 15	PUK; R8; 23	WIN; R9; 14	WIN; R10; Ret	WIN; R11; 17	EAS; R12; 22	EAS; R13; 21	EAS; R14; 24	HDV; R15; 15	HDV; R16; 15	HDV; R17; 24	QLD; R18; 23	QLD; R19; 17	QLD; R20; 12	ORA; R21; 23	ORA; R22; 24	ORA; R23; 19	SAN; R24; 12	BAT; R25; 14	SUR; R26; 19	SUR; R27; 11	SUR; R28; Ret	BHR; R29; 18	BHR; R30; 24	BHR; R31; 18	SYM; R32; 27	SYM; R33; 19	SYM; R34; 17	PHI; R35; 28	PHI; R36; 25	PHI; R37; 23			30th	

=== Complete World Touring Car Championship results ===
(key) (Races in bold indicate pole position) (Races in italics indicate fastest lap)

Year	Team	Car	1	2	3	4	5	6	7	8	9	10	11	DC	Points
1987	(Australia) Peter Jackson Nissan Racing	Nissan Skyline DR30 RS	MNZ	JAR	DIJ	NUR	SPA	BNO	SIL	BAT ovr:2 cls:2	CLD	WEL; Ret	FJI	NC	0

† Not registered for series & points

=== Complete World Sports Prototype Championship results ===
(key) (Races in bold indicate pole position) (Races in italics indicate fastest lap)

Year	Team	Car	1	2	3	4	5	6	7	8	9	10	11	DC	Points
1988	(Australia) Bernie van Elsen	Veskanda C1 Chevrolet	JRZ	JAR	MON	SIL	LMS	BRN	BHT	NUR	SPA	FJI	SAN; DSQ	NC	0

=== Complete European Touring Car Championship results ===
(key) (Races in bold indicate pole position) (Races in italics indicate fastest lap)

Year	Team	Car	1	2	3	4	5	6	7	8	9	10	11	DC	Points
1988	(Australia) Redkote Racing	Ford Sierra RS500	MNZ	DON	EST	JAR	DIJ	VAL	NUR	SPA	ZOL	**SIL**; 21	NOG	NC	0

=== Complete Asia-Pacific Touring Car Championship results ===
(key) (Races in bold indicate pole position) (Races in italics indicate fastest lap)

Year	Team	Car	1	2	3	4	DC	Points
1988	(Australia) Shell Ultra Hi Racing	Ford Sierra RS500	BAT; 2	WEL; Ret	PUK	FJI	N/A	15

=== Complete Bathurst 1000 results ===
Year	Team	Co-drivers	Car	Class	Laps	Pos.	Class pos.
1985	(New Zealand) Mark Petch Motorsport	(New Zealand) Robbie Francevic	Volvo 240T	B	122	DNF	DNF
1986	(Australia) Volvo Dealer Team	(Australia) Alfredo Costanzo	Volvo 240T	B	113	DNF	DNF
1986	(Australia) Volvo Dealer Team	(New Zealand) Graham McRae (New Zealand) Neville Crichton	Volvo 240T	B	156	11th	4th
1987	(Australia) Peter Jackson Nissan Racing	(Australia) Glenn Seton	Nissan Skyline DR30 RS	1	157	2nd	2nd
1988	(Australia) Shell Ultra Hi Racing	(Australia) Dick Johnson	Ford Sierra RS500	A	22	DNF	DNF
1988	(Australia) Shell Ultra Hi Racing	(United Kingdom) Robb Gravett (New Zealand) Neville Crichton	Ford Sierra RS500	A	27	DNF	DNF
1988	(Australia) Shell Ultra Hi Racing	(Australia) John Smith (Australia) Dick Johnson (Australia) Alfredo Costanzo	Ford Sierra RS500	A	160	2nd	2nd
1989	(Australia) Shell Ultra Hi Racing	(Australia) Dick Johnson	Ford Sierra RS500	A	161	1st	1st
1990	(Australia) Shell Ultra Hi Racing	(Australia) Dick Johnson	Ford Sierra RS500	1	94	DNF	DNF
1991	(Australia) Shell Ultra Hi Racing	(Australia) Dick Johnson	Ford Sierra RS500	1	123	DNF	DNF
1991	(Australia) Shell Ultra Hi Racing	(New Zealand) Paul Radisich (Australia) Terry Shiel	Ford Sierra RS500	1	152	DNF	DNF
1992	(Australia) Shell Ultra Hi Racing	(Australia) Dick Johnson	Ford Sierra RS500	A	143	2nd	2nd
1993	(Australia) Shell Racing	(Australia) Dick Johnson	Ford EB Falcon	A	96	DNF	DNF
1994	(Australia) Shell FAI Racing	(Australia) Dick Johnson	Ford EB Falcon	A	161	1st	1st
1995	(Australia) Shell FAI Racing	(Australia) Dick Johnson	Ford EF Falcon		110	DNF	DNF
1996	(Australia) Shell FAI Racing	(Australia) Dick Johnson	Ford EF Falcon		161	2nd	2nd
1997	(Australia) Shell FAI Racing	(Australia) Dick Johnson	Ford EL Falcon	L1	17	DNF	DNF
1998	(Australia) Dick Johnson Racing	(Australia) Cameron McConville	Ford EL Falcon	OC	80	DNF	DNF
1999	(Australia) PAE Motorsport	(New Zealand) Jim Richards	Ford AU Falcon		82	DNF	DNF
2000	(Australia) Briggs Motor Sport	(New Zealand) Jim Richards	Ford AU Falcon		147	DNF	DNF
2001	(Australia) Briggs Motor Sport	(New Zealand) Simon Wills	Ford AU Falcon		124	DNF	DNF
2002	(Australia) OzEmail Racing Team	(Australia) Brad Jones	Ford AU Falcon		158	16th	16th
2003	(Australia) OzEmail Racing Team	(Australia) Brad Jones	Ford BA Falcon		160	10th	10th
2004	(Australia) OzEmail Racing Team	(Australia) Brad Jones	Ford BA Falcon		161	3rd	3rd
2005	(Australia) Team BOC	(Australia) Brad Jones	Ford BA Falcon		125	21st	21st
2006	(Australia) Brad Jones Racing	(Australia) Brad Jones	Ford BA Falcon		161	11th	11th
2007	(Australia) Paul Cruickshank Racing	(Australia) Jonathon Webb	Ford BF Falcon		160	14th	14th

=== Complete Sandown 500 results ===
Year	Team	Co-drivers	Car	Class	Laps	Pos.	Class pos.
1985	(Australia) Mark Petch Motorsport	(New Zealand) Robbie Francevic	Volvo 240T	B	60	DNF	DNF
1986	(Australia) Volvo Dealer Team	(Australia) Alfredo Costanzo	Volvo 240T	B	112	DNF	DNF
1987	(Australia) Peter Jackson Nissan Racing	(Australia) Glenn Seton	Nissan Skyline DR30 RS	B	86	NC	NC
1988	(Australia) Shell Ultra Hi Racing	(Australia) Dick Johnson	Ford Sierra RS500	A	125	3rd	3rd
1989	(Australia) Shell Ultra Hi Racing	(Australia) Dick Johnson	Ford Sierra RS500	A	159	5th	5th
1990	(Australia) Shell Ultra Hi Racing	(Australia) Dick Johnson	Ford Sierra RS500	Div.1	18	DNF	DNF
1990	(Australia) Shell Ultra Hi Racing	(United Kingdom) Jeff Allam (New Zealand) Paul Radisich	Ford Sierra RS500	Div.1	60	DNF	DNF
1992	(Australia) Shell Ultra Hi Racing	(Australia) Dick Johnson	Ford Sierra RS500	3A	31	DNF	DNF
1993	(Australia) Shell FAI Racing	(Australia) Dick Johnson (Australia) Cameron McConville	Ford EB Falcon	V8	147	6th	6th
1994	(Australia) Shell FAI Racing	(Australia) Dick Johnson	Ford EB Falcon	V8	161	1st	1st
1995	(Australia) Shell FAI Racing	(Australia) Dick Johnson	Ford EF Falcon		161	1st	1st
1996	(Australia) Shell FAI Racing	(Australia) Dick Johnson	Ford EF Falcon		159	6th	6th
1997	(Australia) Shell FAI Racing	(Australia) Dick Johnson	Ford EL Falcon		108	DNF	DNF
1998	(Australia) Shell FAI Racing	(Australia) Cameron McConville	Ford EL Falcon		147	3rd	3rd
2001	(Australia) Prancing Horse Racing Scuderia	(United Kingdom) Tom Waring	Ferrari 360 Challenge	N	161	1st	1st
2002	(Australia) Prancing Horse Racing Scuderia	(Australia) Steve Beards	Ferrari 360 N-GT	G1	160	3rd	3rd
2003	(Australia) OzEmail Racing Team	(Australia) Brad Jones	Ford BA Falcon		141	4th	4th
2004	(Australia) OzEmail Racing Team	(Australia) Brad Jones	Ford BA Falcon		160	7th	7th
2005	(Australia) Team BOC	(Australia) Brad Jones	Ford BA Falcon		160	9th	9th
2006	(Australia) Team BOC	(Australia) Brad Jones	Ford BA Falcon		161	5th	5th
2007	(Australia) Paul Cruickshank Racing	(Australia) Jonathon Webb	Ford BF Falcon		160	12th	12th
2011	(Australia) GWS Personnel	(Australia) Peter O'Donnell	BMW 335i	B	131	6th	1st

=== Complete Bathurst/Eastern Creek 12 Hour results ===
Year	Team	Co-drivers	Car	Class	Laps	Pos.	Class pos.
1992	(Australia) Mazda Motorsport	(Australia) Gregg Hansford	Mazda RX-7 SP	T	245	5th	3rd
1994	(New Zealand) Neville Crichton	(Australia) Alan Jones (New Zealand) Neville Crichton	BMW M3	X	120	DNF	DNF
1995^{1}	(Australia) Mazda Motorsport	(Australia) Dick Johnson	Mazda RX-7 SP	X	409	1st	1st
2007	(Australia) Century 21	(Australia) Chris Delfsma (Australia) Jack Elsegood	Ford BF Falcon XR8	D	244	9	1
2008	(Australia) Century 21	(Australia) Chris Delfsma (Australia) Paul Stubber	Ford BF Falcon XR8	D	181	24	4
2009	(Australia) Johnson Window Film	(Australia) Jim Hunter (Australia) Gavin Bullas	Subaru Impreza WRX	C	85	DNF	DNF
2010	(Australia) Eastern Creek International Karting	(Australia) Paul Morris (Australia) Garry Holt	BMW 335i	B	202	1	1
2011	(Australia) Maranello Motorsport	(Australia) Peter Edwards (Australia) Tim Leahey	Ferrari 430 GT3	A	161	DNF	DNF
2012	(Australia) Maranello Motorsport	(Australia) Peter Edwards (Germany) Dominik Farnbacher (Denmark) Allan Simonsen	Ferrari 458 GT3	A	114	DNF	DNF
2013	(Australia) Maranello Motorsport	(Australia) Peter Edwards (Finland) Mika Salo (Denmark) Allan Simonsen	Ferrari 458 GT3	A	111	DNF	DNF
2014	(Australia) Maranello Motorsport	(Australia) Craig Lowndes (Australia) Peter Edwards (Finland) Mika Salo	Ferrari 458 GT3	A	296	1	1
2015	(Australia) Flying B Motorsport	(Australia) David Brabham (Australia) Peter Edwards	Bentley Continental GT3	AA	254	DNF	DNF

Notes

^1 – The 1995 race was staged at Eastern Creek Raceway as the 1995 Eastern Creek 12 Hour. All other races were held at the Mount Panorama Circuit.

=== Complete Bathurst 24 Hour results ===
Year	Team	Co-drivers	Car	Class	Laps	Pos.	Class pos.
2002	(Australia) Prancing Horse Racing Scuderia	(Australia) Brad Jones (Australia) Paul Morris (Australia) John Teulan	Ferrari 360 N-GT	1	96	DNF	DNF
2003	(Australia) Prancing Horse Racing	(Australia) Neil Crompton (Australia) Greg Crick (Indonesia) Maher Algadrie	BMW M3 GTR	A	131	DNF	DNF

Sporting positions
Preceded by Alfredo Costanzo	Winner of the Australian Drivers' Championship; 1984 and 1985	Succeeded by Graham Watson
Preceded by Tony Longhurst; Tomas Mezera	Winner of the Bathurst 1000; 1989 (with Dick Johnson)	Succeeded by Allan Grice; Win Percy
Preceded by Larry Perkins; Gregg Hansford	Winner of the Bathurst 1000; 1994 (with Dick Johnson)	Succeeded by Larry Perkins; Russell Ingall
Preceded by Gregg Hansford; Neil Crompton	Winner of the Eastern Creek 12 Hour; 1995 (with Dick Johnson)	Succeeded by Craig Baird; Paul Morris; Garry Holt
Preceded by Mark Skaife	Winner of the Australian Touring Car Championship; 1995	Succeeded by Craig Lowndes
Preceded by Tony Longhurst; Rod Salmon; Damien White	Winner of the Bathurst 12 Hour; 2010 (with Garry Holt & Paul Morris)	Succeeded by Marc Basseng; Christopher Mies; Darryl O'Young
Preceded by Bernd Schneider; Thomas Jäger; Alexander Roloff	Winner of the Bathurst 12 Hour; 2014 (with Peter Edwards & Craig Lowndes & Mika Salo)	Succeeded by Katsumasa Chiyo; Wolfgang Reip; Florian Strauss
Records
Preceded by Peter Brock; 212 starts (1973 – 2002)	Most V8 Supercar starts 225 (1986 – 2013); 213th start at the 2007 PlaceMakers V8 Supercars	Succeeded by Russell Ingall
