= 1987 Australian Sports Car Championship =

Seasons
- ← 1986 1988 →

The 1987 Australian Sports Car Championship was a CAMS sanctioned Australian national motor racing title open to Group A Sports Cars, Group D GT cars, FISA Group C1 cars and FISA Group C2 cars.

The title, which was the 19th Australian Sports Car Championship, was won by Andy Roberts driving his self-designed Robert SR3 powered by a 1.6 litre Ford BDA Formula Mondial engine. While not winning a round, Roberts was assisted by the point system which awarded more points for outright positions achieved by Up to 1.6 litres class cars than for the same positions achieved by larger engined cars. Roberts was also the only driver in the top 5 championship placings to finish all 3 rounds. Defending champion John Bowe was expected to dominate the series in Bernie van Elsen's Veskanda C1 Chevrolet, and did easily win Rounds 2 and 3 (including setting the outright lap record in Round 2 at Amaroo Park), but a failure to start in the opening round at Calder Park Raceway saw him only finish second in the championship. Finishing third was Terry Hook in his Chevrolet powered ex-Rupert Keegan Lola T610 with two second-place finishes at Calder and Sandown.

== Calendar ==
The championship was contested over a three-round series with one race per round.

Round	Circuit	State	Date	Winner	Car
1	Calder Park Raceway	Victoria	1 March	Rusty French	Porsche 935
2	Amaroo Park	New South Wales	17 May	John Bowe	Veskanda C1 Chevrolet
3	Sandown Park	Victoria	13-Sep	John Bowe	Veskanda C1 Chevrolet

Additional rounds scheduled at Lakeside (April 5), Adelaide International Raceway (3 May) and Winton (30 August ) were cancelled.

== Classes ==
Cars competed in three engine capacity classes.

- Up to 1.6 litres
- 1.6 to 3 litres
- Over 3 litres

== Points system ==
Championship points were awarded to the top twenty outright placegetters in each round based on the following three tier structure.

Outright Position	1st	2nd	3rd	4th	5th	6th	7th	8th	9th	10th	11th	12th	13th	14th	15th	16th	17th	18th	19th	20th
Up to 1.6 litres	30	27	24	21	19	17	15	14	13	12	11	10	9	8	7	6	5	4	3	2
1.6 to 3 litres	28	26	23	20	17	15	14	13	12	11	10	9	8	7	6	5	4	3	2	1
Over 3 litres	25	23	20	17	15	13	11	10	9	8	7	6	5	4	3	2	1	-	-	-

== Results ==
Position	Driver	No.	Car	Calder	Amaroo	Sandown	Total
1	Andy Roberts	42	Roberts SR3 Ford BDA	21	27	21	69
2	John Bowe	1	Veskanda C1 Chevrolet	-	25	25	50
3	Terry Hook	15	Lola T610 Chevrolet	23	-	23	46
4	Ray Hanger		Rennmax Ford BDG	15	-	19	34
5	Rusty French	7	Porsche 935/80	25	-	-	25

Note: The above table lists only the first five positions in the championship.
