= 1988 360 km of Sandown Park =

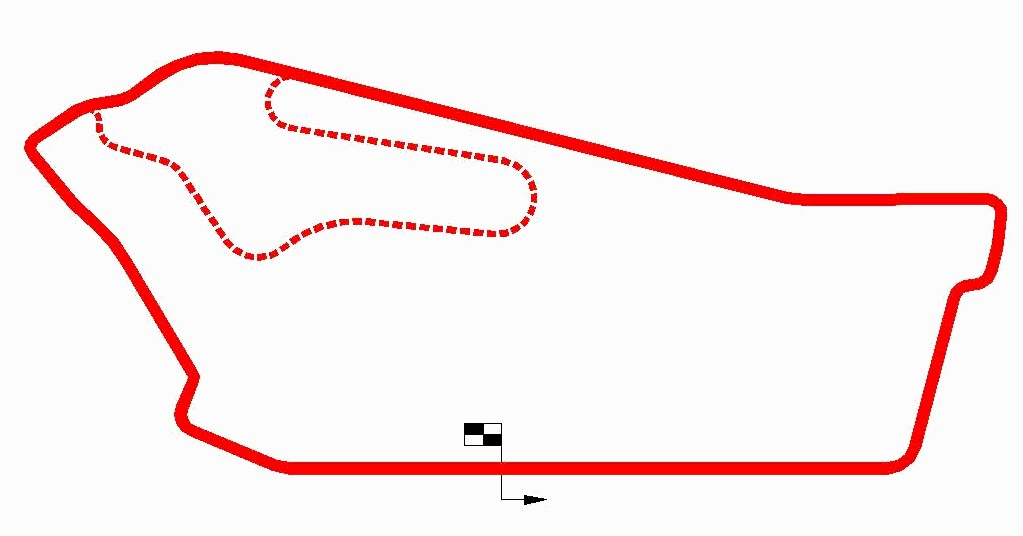
Layout of the Sandown Raceway international circuit (1984-1998)

The 1988 Lucas Supersprint (historically known as the 1988 360 km of Sandown Park) was the eleventh and final round of the 1988 World Sports-Prototype Championship. It took place at Sandown Raceway, Victoria, Australia on 20 November 1988.

Due to being a short sprint and thus having a smaller points scale for the championship, several teams, most notably the Porsches of Brun Motorsport, Joest Racing, Kremer Racing, and Richard Lloyd Racing, opted not to attend this event.

Unlike the previous World Endurance Championship race held at Sandown in 1984 which included an invitation class for cars that competed in the Australian GT and Sports Car championships, the Lucas Supersprint was open to those who complied with WSPC rules, with only the Group C1 and C2 classes being represented. The only local entry was the Bernie van Elsen entered Veskanda C1 Chevrolet driven by touring car stars John Bowe and Dick Johnson (Bowe was the car's driver when it dominated the 1986 Australian Sports Car Championship). The car was able to race as although it had been built to conform to Australia's Group A Sports Car rules, it also met the FIA's Group C regulations. As its name suggested, the Australian Veskanda was a Group C1 (outright) car, although local television broadcasters ABC erroneously labeled it as a Group C2 car.

== Official results ==
=== Qualifying Results ===
Pos.	Class	No	Entrant	Car	Time
Pole	**C1**	**61**	**(Switzerland) Team Sauber Mercedes**	**Sauber C9 Mercedes-Benz**	**1:28.620**
2	C1	62	(Switzerland) Team Sauber Mercedes	Sauber C9 Mercedes-Benz	1:29.980
3	C1	2	(United Kingdom) Silk Cut Jaguar (United Kingdom) Tom Walkinshaw Racing	Jaguar XJR-9	1:30.200
4	C1	1	(United Kingdom) Silk Cut Jaguar (United Kingdom) Tom Walkinshaw Racing	Jaguar XJR-9	1:30.950
5	**C2**	**111**	**(United Kingdom) Spice Engineering**	**Spice SE88C Ford**	**1:34.950**
6	C1	20	(United Kingdom) Team Davey	Porsche 962C	1:35.030
7	C2	107	(United Kingdom) Chamberlain Engineering	Spice SE88C Ford	1:35.500
8	C1	26	(Australia) Bernie van Elsen	Veskanda C1 Chevrolet	1:35.510
9	C2	103	(United Kingdom) Spice Engineering	Spice SE88C Ford	1:35.650
10	C2	121	(United Kingdom) Cosmik GP Motorsport	Spice SE87C Ford	1:36.230
11	C2	127	(United Kingdom) Chamberlain Engineering	Spice SE86C Hart	1:36.300
12	C2	115	(United Kingdom) ADA Engineering	ADA 03 Ford	1:37.110
13	C2	109	(Italy) Kelmar Racing	Tiga GC288 Ford	1:37.410
14	C1	40	(Switzerland) Swiss Team Salamin	Porsche 962C	1:40.050
15	C2	178	(France) Automobiles Louis Descartes	ALD 04 BMW	1:41.810
16	C2	26	(France) MT Sport Racing	Argo JM19C Ford	1:44.340
17	C2	198	(United Kingdom) Roy Baker Racing	Tiga GC286 Ford	1:44.850
18	C2	183	(West Germany) Walter Maurer Racing	Maurer Lotec C87 BMW	1:45.340

=== Race ===
Class winners in bold. Cars failing to complete 75% of the winner's distance marked as Not Classified (NC).

Pos	Class	No	Team	Drivers	Chassis	Tyre	Laps	Grid
Pos	Class	No	Team	Drivers	Engine	Tyre	Laps	Grid
1	**C1**	**61**	**(Switzerland) Team Sauber Mercedes**	**(France) Jean-Louis Schlesser (West Germany) Jochen Mass**	**Sauber C9**	**MI**	**93**	**1**
1	**C1**	**61**	**(Switzerland) Team Sauber Mercedes**	**(France) Jean-Louis Schlesser (West Germany) Jochen Mass**	**Mercedes-Benz M117 5.0L Turbo V8**	**MI**	**93**	**1**
2	C1	62	(Switzerland) Team Sauber Mercedes	(Italy) Mauro Baldi (Sweden) Stefan Johansson	Sauber C9	**MI**	93	2
2	C1	62	(Switzerland) Team Sauber Mercedes	(Italy) Mauro Baldi (Sweden) Stefan Johansson	Mercedes-Benz M117 5.0L Turbo V8	**MI**	93	2
3	C1	1	(United Kingdom) Silk Cut Jaguar (United Kingdom) Tom Walkinshaw Racing	(United Kingdom) Martin Brundle (United States) Eddie Cheever	Jaguar XJR-9	**D**	93	4
3	C1	1	(United Kingdom) Silk Cut Jaguar (United Kingdom) Tom Walkinshaw Racing	(United Kingdom) Martin Brundle (United States) Eddie Cheever	Jaguar 7.0L V12	**D**	93	4
4	C1	2	(United Kingdom) Silk Cut Jaguar (United Kingdom) Tom Walkinshaw Racing	(Netherlands) Jan Lammers (United Kingdom) Johnny Dumfries	Jaguar XJR-9	**D**	92	3
4	C1	2	(United Kingdom) Silk Cut Jaguar (United Kingdom) Tom Walkinshaw Racing	(Netherlands) Jan Lammers (United Kingdom) Johnny Dumfries	Jaguar 7.0L V12	**D**	92	3
5	**C2**	**111**	**(United Kingdom) Spice Engineering**	**(United Kingdom) Ray Bellm (United Kingdom) Gordon Spice**	**Spice SE88C**	**G**	**88**	**5**
5	**C2**	**111**	**(United Kingdom) Spice Engineering**	**(United Kingdom) Ray Bellm (United Kingdom) Gordon Spice**	**Ford Cosworth DFL 3.3L V8**	**G**	**88**	**5**
6	C1	20	(United Kingdom) Team Davey	(Australia) Neil Crang (United Kingdom) Tim Lee-Davey	Porsche 962C	**D**	88	6
6	C1	20	(United Kingdom) Team Davey	(Australia) Neil Crang (United Kingdom) Tim Lee-Davey	Porsche Type-935 3.0L Turbo Flat-6	**D**	88	6
7	C2	115	(United Kingdom) ADA Engineering	(Australia) Arthur Abrahams (Australia) John Smith	ADA 03	**G**	88	12
7	C2	115	(United Kingdom) ADA Engineering	(Australia) Arthur Abrahams (Australia) John Smith	Ford Cosworth DFL 3.3L V8	**G**	88	12
8	C2	109	(Italy) Kelmar Racing	(Italy) Ranieri Randaccio (Italy) Stefano Sebastiani	Tiga GC288	**A**	84	13
8	C2	109	(Italy) Kelmar Racing	(Italy) Ranieri Randaccio (Italy) Stefano Sebastiani	Ford Cosworth DFL 3.3L V8	**A**	84	13
9	C2	127	(United Kingdom) Chamberlain Engineering	(Australia) Andrew Miedecke (United Kingdom) Nick Adams	Spice SE86C	**A**	82	11
9	C2	127	(United Kingdom) Chamberlain Engineering	(Australia) Andrew Miedecke (United Kingdom) Nick Adams	Hart 418T 1.8L Turbo I4	**A**	82	11
10	C2	183	(West Germany) Walter Maurer Racing	(West Germany) Helmut Gall (West Germany) Walter Maurer	Maurer Lotec C87	?	77	18
10	C2	183	(West Germany) Walter Maurer Racing	(West Germany) Helmut Gall (West Germany) Walter Maurer	BMW 2.0L Turbo I4	?	77	18
11	C2	178	(France) Automobiles Louis Descartes	(France) Michel Lateste (France) Louis Descartes	ALD 04	**A**	76	15
11	C2	178	(France) Automobiles Louis Descartes	(France) Michel Lateste (France) Louis Descartes	BMW M80 3.5L I6	**A**	76	15
12 NC	C2	198	(United Kingdom) Roy Baker Racing	(Australia) Michael Hall (United Kingdom) John Bartlett	Tiga GC286	**D**	56	17
12 NC	C2	198	(United Kingdom) Roy Baker Racing	(Australia) Michael Hall (United Kingdom) John Bartlett	Ford Cosworth DFL 3.3L V8	**D**	56	17
13 NC	C2	103	(United Kingdom) Spice Engineering	(Chile) Eliseo Salazar (Denmark) Thorkild Thyrring	Spice SE88C	**G**	54	9
13 NC	C2	103	(United Kingdom) Spice Engineering	(Chile) Eliseo Salazar (Denmark) Thorkild Thyrring	Ford Cosworth DFL 3.3L V8	**G**	54	9
14 DNF	C2	121	(United Kingdom) Cosmik GP Motorsport	(France) Philippe de Henning (Greece) Costas Los	Spice SE87C	**G**	87	10
14 DNF	C2	121	(United Kingdom) Cosmik GP Motorsport	(France) Philippe de Henning (Greece) Costas Los	Ford Cosworth DFL 3.3L V8	**G**	87	10
15 DNF	C2	124	(France) MT Sport Racing	(France) Jean Messaoudi (France) Pierre-Francois Rousselot	Argo JM19C	**A**	77	16
15 DNF	C2	124	(France) MT Sport Racing	(France) Jean Messaoudi (France) Pierre-Francois Rousselot	Ford Cosworth DFL 3.3L V8	**A**	77	16
16 DNF	C1	40	(Switzerland) Swiss Team Salamin	(Italy) Giovanni Lavaggi (Switzerland) Antoine Salamin	Porsche 962C	**G**	41	14
16 DNF	C1	40	(Switzerland) Swiss Team Salamin	(Italy) Giovanni Lavaggi (Switzerland) Antoine Salamin	Porsche Type-935 3.0L Turbo Flat-6	**G**	41	14
17 DNF	C2	107	(United Kingdom) Chamberlain Engineering	(France) Claude Ballot-Léna (France) Jean-Louis Ricci	Spice SE88C	**A**	14	7
17 DNF	C2	107	(United Kingdom) Chamberlain Engineering	(France) Claude Ballot-Léna (France) Jean-Louis Ricci	Ford Cosworth DFL 3.3L V8	**A**	14	7
DSQ^{†}	C1	26	(Australia) Bernie van Elsen	(Australia) John Bowe (Australia) Dick Johnson	Veskanda C1	**D**	87	8
DSQ^{†}	C1	26	(Australia) Bernie van Elsen	(Australia) John Bowe (Australia) Dick Johnson	Chevrolet 6.0L V8	**D**	87	8

† - The #26 Veskanda-Chevrolet of John Bowe and Dick Johnson was disqualified for using more fuel than the regulations allowed.

== Statistics ==
- Pole Position - Jean-Louis Schlesser - Team Sauber Mercedes - 1:28.620
- Fastest Lap - Jean-Louis Schlesser - Team Sauber Mercedes - 1:33.580
- Average Speed - 144.355 km/h

== Sources ==
- Australian Motor Racing Year, 1988/89. Vol. 18.
- "FIA World Sports-Prototype Championship 1988". World Sports Racing Prototypes. 2 October 2005. Archived from the original on 26 April 2008.
- "1988 Sandown Park Supersprint". Team Dan Motorsport Almanac. 30 December 2003.
- "Sandown Park 360km 1988 (Photo Archive)". Racing Sports Cars. 11 June 2006. Archived from the original on 8 January 2008.

World Sportscar Championship
Previous race: 1988 1000km of Fuji	1988 season	Next race: None
