= Calder Park Raceway =

Motorsport track in Australia

- Combined Circuit (1987–present)

- National Circuit (1986–present)
- Location: Melbourne, Victoria, Australia
- Coordinates: 37°40′18″S 144°45′21″E
- Capacity: 44,000 (Thunderdome)
- Owner: Rodney McDonald
- Operator: Australian Motorsport Club Limited
- Opened: 14 January 1962; 64 years ago
- Major events: Former: World Touring Car Championship (1987); V8 Supercars; Calder Park V8 Supercar round (1969–1983, 1985–1988, 1996–2001); Australian Drivers' Championship (1974–1978, 1980, 1982–1984, 1986, 1988, 1996–1998, 2001); Australian Super Touring Championship (1995, 1997–1999); Goodyear NASCAR 500 (1988); Australian GT (1963, 1982–1985); Australian Grand Prix (1980–1984)

Thunderdome (1987–present)
- Surface: Asphalt
- Length: 1.801 km (1.119 mi)
- Turns: 4
- Banking: Turns: 24° Front straight: 4° Back straight: 6°

National Circuit (1986–present)
- Surface: Asphalt
- Length: 2.280 km (1.417 mi)
- Turns: 9
- Race lap record: 0:52.69 ( (Australia) John Bowe, Veskanda C1, 1986, Group C)

Combined Circuit (Road+Oval) (1987–present)
- Surface: Asphalt
- Length: 4.216 km (2.620 mi)
- Turns: 15
- Banking: Thunderdome; Turns: 24° Front straight: 4° Back straight: 6°
- Race lap record: 1:45.03 ( (Australia) Andrew Miedecke, Ford Sierra RS500 Cosworth, 1987, Group A)

Main Circuit (1984–1985)
- Surface: Asphalt
- Length: 1.609 km (1.000 mi)
- Turns: 6
- Race lap record: 0:41.27 ( (Austria) Niki Lauda, Ralt RT4, 1984, Formula Mondial)

Original Circuit (1962–1984)
- Surface: Asphalt
- Length: 1.609 km (1.000 mi)
- Turns: 4
- Race lap record: 0:36.9 ( (Australia) Alan Jones, Williams FW07, 1980, F1)

Calder Park Raceway is a motor racing circuit in Melbourne, Victoria, Australia. The complex includes a dragstrip, a road circuit with several possible configurations, and the "Thunderdome", a high-speed banked oval equipped to race either clockwise (for right-hand-drive cars) or anti-clockwise (for left-hand-drive cars such as NASCAR).

As of 2025, the dragstrip and the road circuit remain in use for grassroots-level motorsport events, but the banked oval has not been used since 1999.

== History ==
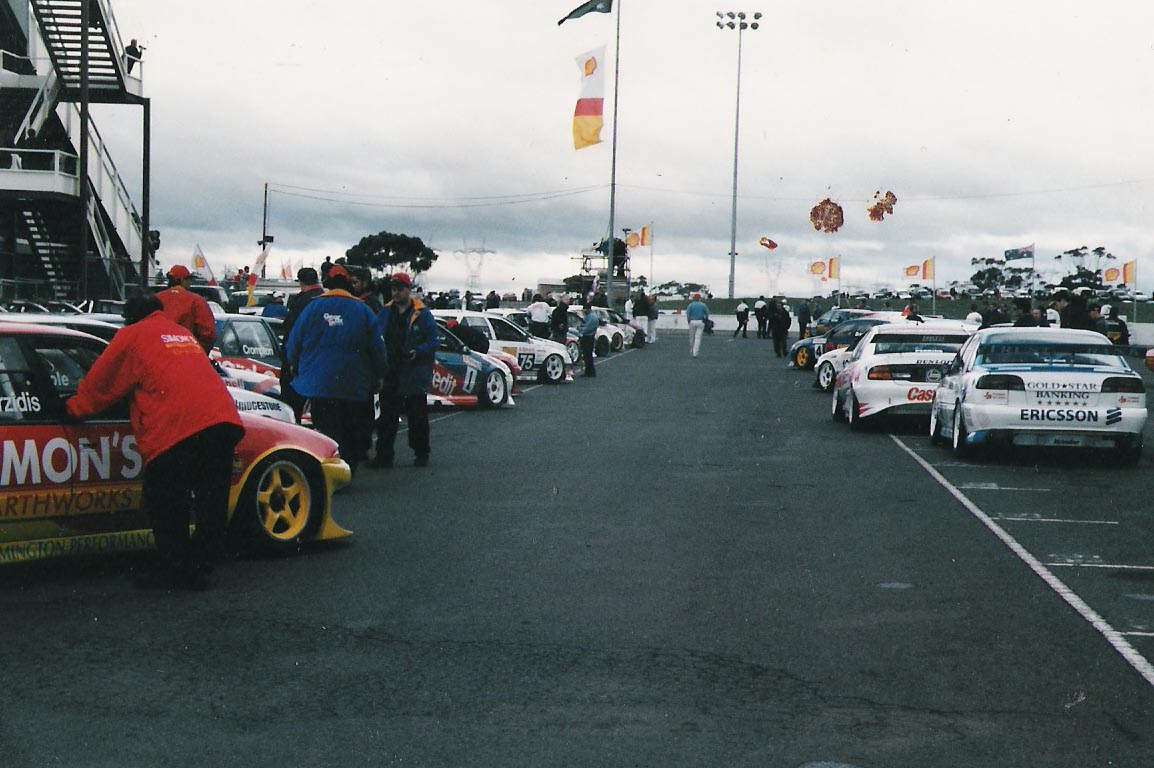
V8 Supercars line up in dummy grid at Calder Park, 1998.

Calder Park Raceway was founded in the farming community of Diggers Rest and began as a dirt track carved into a paddock by a group of motoring enthusiasts who wanted somewhere to race their FJ Holdens. One of those men was Patrick Hawthorn, who at the time owned a petrol station in Clayton, when one of his clients suggested a place to race, on his property.

The inaugural meeting on a bitumen track was run by the Australian Motor Sports Club and took place on 14 January 1962. The track design was very similar to the existing Club Circuit, which is still in use today. Competitors at this meeting included former Calder Park owner Bob Jane (Autoland Jaguar 3.8 #84), Norm Beechey (Holden #40), John Wood (Holden #83) and Peter Manton (Mini Cooper).

In the early 1970s, champion racer and Melbourne tyre retailer Bob Jane purchased the track. The circuit not only hosted road racing but also drag racing while the infield formed part of the Rallycross track. The 1.609 km (1.000 mi) circuit was increased in length in 1986 to 2.280 km (1.417 mi), though the short circuit still remains. As part of the changes to the circuit, the main straight was lengthened from 700 m (770 yd) to just under 1,000 m (1,100 yd) in length while the final turn (which was known for a long time as Gloweave Corner) was also moved forward approximately 75 m (82 yd) so that the road course and the start of the drag racing strip were separate (this was due to long time complaints from drivers and bike riders that the start of the main straight was notoriously slippery, especially in the wet, due to it also being the start of the drag strip). Lengthening the straight also gave the drag strip a longer runoff and slow down area. Jane also had the 1.801 km (1.119 mi) high banked NASCAR style Thunderdome built on the east side of the road circuit which opened in August 1987.

In 1982 the circuit was renamed to the Melbourne International Raceway, while for the round of the 1985 Australian Touring Car Championship, series broadcaster Channel 7 referred to Calder as the Keilor International Raceway.

== Thunderdome ==
The Thunderdome is a purpose-built 1.801 km (1.119 mi) quad-oval speedway located on the grounds of Calder Park Raceway. It was originally known as the Goodyear Thunderdome to reflect the naming rights sponsorship bought by the Goodyear Tire & Rubber Company.

With its "double dogleg" front stretch and the start/finish line located on a straight section rather than the apex of a curve, the Thunderdome is technically a quad-oval in shape, though since its opening it has generally been referred to as a tri-oval. The track, modelled on a scaled down version of the famous Charlotte Motor Speedway, has 24° banking on Turns 1, 2, 3 and 4 while the front stretch is banked at 4° and the back straight at 6°.

The Thunderdome was completed in 1987, but can trace its roots back over twenty years previously when Australian motorsport icon Bob Jane, previous owner of Calder Park Raceway, travelled to the United States and visited the Charlotte Motor Speedway and Daytona International Speedway numerous times to gauge stock car racing's rise in popularity. With NASCAR getting more air time on Australian television largely thanks to the influence of Channel 7 motorsport commentator and Sydney speedway promoter Mike Raymond, in 1981 Jane struck a deal with Bill France Jr., the head of NASCAR, to bring stock car racing to Australia and plans were laid out for a high banked oval adjacent to the existing Calder Park Raceway.

Ground first broke for the track in 1983 and it took four years to complete. It was built at a cost of A$54 million— with Jane personally contributing over $20 million of his own money. Due to the lack of such knowledge in Australia, during construction Jane was forced to bring in engineers from the US who had experience in building high banked speedway ovals. The Thunderdome was officially opened by the Mayor of the Keilor City Council on 3 August 1987.

The first race on the Thunderdome was held just two weeks after its opening, although the track used incorporated both the Thunderdome and the pre-existing National Circuit. It was a 300-kilometre event for Group A touring cars, with John Bowe and Terry Shiel in a turbocharged Nissan Skyline DR30 RS taking first place – to date the only time a Japanese car has won a race held on the Thunderdome.

AUSCAR had the distinction of hosting the first ever race to exclusively use the Thunderdome. The race, aptly named the AUSCAR 200, was held a week prior to the Goodyear NASCAR 500. In a shock to the male dominated establishment, 18-year-old female driver Terri Sawyer won the 110 lap race driving a Holden VK Commodore. Sawyer had qualified her Commodore on the front row of the grid and ran at or near the front all day to win from Kim Jane (the nephew of Calder owner Bob Jane), Max de Jersey, Phil Brock and Graham Smith. The top five positions all went to those driving either a VK or VL Commodore. Greg East, also driving a VK Commodore, sat on pole for the AUSCAR 200 with a time of 33.2 seconds for an average speed of 195.28 km/h (121.34 mph).

The first NASCAR race that used only the oval was the Goodyear NASCAR 500 held on 28 February 1988 (unlike the "500s" in US NASCAR racing, the Australian version was only 500 km, or 310 mi - roughly the same distance as a Busch Series race). The race was nationally televised by the Seven Network and was shown in the USA on ESPN. It featured some of Australia's top touring car and speedway drivers as well as a slew of imports from the Winston Cup, including Bobby Allison (who had won his third Daytona 500 just two weeks earlier in a thrilling finish from his son Davey, giving the Thunderdome race a big publicity boost), Neil Bonnett (who had won the Winston Cup race at the Richmond International Raceway the previous weekend), Michael Waltrip, Harry Gant, Morgan Shepherd, Dave Marcis, Rick Wilson and others. NASCAR's most famous last name was also represented with 1987 Coca-Cola 600 winner Kyle Petty making the trip down under.

In a test session prior to the 1988 Goodyear NASCAR 500, NASCAR's "King" Richard Petty, the record holder for the most victories in NASCAR history with 200 career wins and the father of Kyle Petty, set an unofficial lap record for the Thunderdome of 28.2 seconds for an average speed of 142.85 mp/h. This was some 6/10ths of a second (3.1 mph (5.0 km/h)) faster than Bonnett's pole time for the race.

Bonnett won the race in a Pontiac Grand Prix from Allison in a Buick LeSabre and Marcis in a Chevrolet Monte Carlo. The race saw a heavy crash on lap 80 which took some 6 cars out of the race including Australian's Dick Johnson (Ford Thunderbird) and Allan Grice (Oldsmobile Delta 88) who suffered a broken collar bone after hitting Johnson's already crashed car at high speed in the middle of turns 3 and 4. Grice, who like Johnson had a Racecam unit in his car and in a NASCAR first was able to talk to the Channel 7 commentary team while racing, had been unable to slow sufficiently due to his car's lack of brakes which he had told the television audience about only laps before the crash.

This was the first time a NASCAR event had been staged outside North America and it proved so popular that many of the same drivers returned for another race held at the Thunderdome that December, the Christmas 500, with three-time Indianapolis 500 winner Johnny Rutherford returning to Australia for the first time since his brief appearance in the 1977 Bathurst 1000 to be part of the driving line up. Morgan Shepherd would go on to win the race with a four-second margin over Sterling Marlin, the only two competitors in the event to finish on the lead lap.

The Thunderdome also played host to numerous Australian Stock Car Auto Racing (AUSCAR) events. AUSCAR was unique in that the cars were right-hand drive and based on the Australian Ford Falcon and Holden Commodore. Engines were limited to 5.0L which allowed use of the existing Holden V8 engine and the Ford 302 engine, though until Ford Australia re-introduced the 302 V8 to the Falcon range in 1991, those who raced the Ford XF Falcon used the 5.8L 351 Cleveland V8. Unlike NASCAR, the right-hand drive AUSCARs raced clockwise on oval tracks such as the Thunderdome and the 1/2 mile Speedway Super Bowl at the Adelaide International Raceway. The most successful AUSCAR driver was Brad Jones who won five straight championships from 1989/90 until 1993/94 in various Commodores. Jones also successfully made the transition to NASCAR, winning the Superspeedway Series on his first try in 1994/95.

The last events on the Thunderdome layout ran in 1999, due to an across-the-board collapse in entry numbers in both AUSCAR and NASCAR.

As of 2023, the Thunderdome is reportedly driveable, but is not currently used for motorsport competition.

== Motorsport ==
Calder Park has hosted events ranging from Australian touring cars, historics, Super Tourers, Super Trucks and Super Bikes to rock concerts featuring world class artists such as Fleetwood Mac, Santana and Guns N' Roses.

Between 1980 and 1984, Calder Park played host to the Australian Grand Prix. The 1980 race was won by Australia's Alan Jones driving the Williams FW07B he drove to win the 1980 Formula One World Championship, the race being open to F1, Formula 5000 and Formula Pacific cars (as of 2022 this is the final time an Australian driver won the AGP). Young Brazilian driver Roberto Moreno dominated the AGP from 1981 to 1984, winning the race in 1981, 1983 and 1984, while finishing third behind F1 aces Alain Prost and Jacques Laffite in 1982. During this period, Calder owner Bob Jane managed to entice many F1 drivers to race in the Grand Prix at Calder including World Champions Jones, Prost, Niki Lauda, Nelson Piquet and Keke Rosberg as well as Laffite, Bruno Giacomelli, Didier Pironi, François Hesnault and Andrea de Cesaris, as well as Australian internationals Geoff Brabham and Larry Perkins. The 1981-1984 races were open to Formula Pacific cars only with both Moreno and Prost winning the races driving 1.6-litre Ford powered Ralt RT4s.

A round of the 1987 World Touring Car Championship was held on the Calder Park Grand Prix circuit on 11 October 1987. This race used the combined road and oval circuits and was won by the Eggenberger Motorsport Ford Sierra RS500 driven by Steve Soper and Pierre Dieudonné.

Also in 1987, the combined road-oval circuit was used for a round of the Swann Series for Superbikes. For safety reasons the bikes were not allowed onto the 24° banked turns in the Thunderdome and they had to use the flat track apron as the turns. The bikes were allowed onto the 4° front straight with witches hats (cones) placed on the track to tell riders where the edge of the track was.

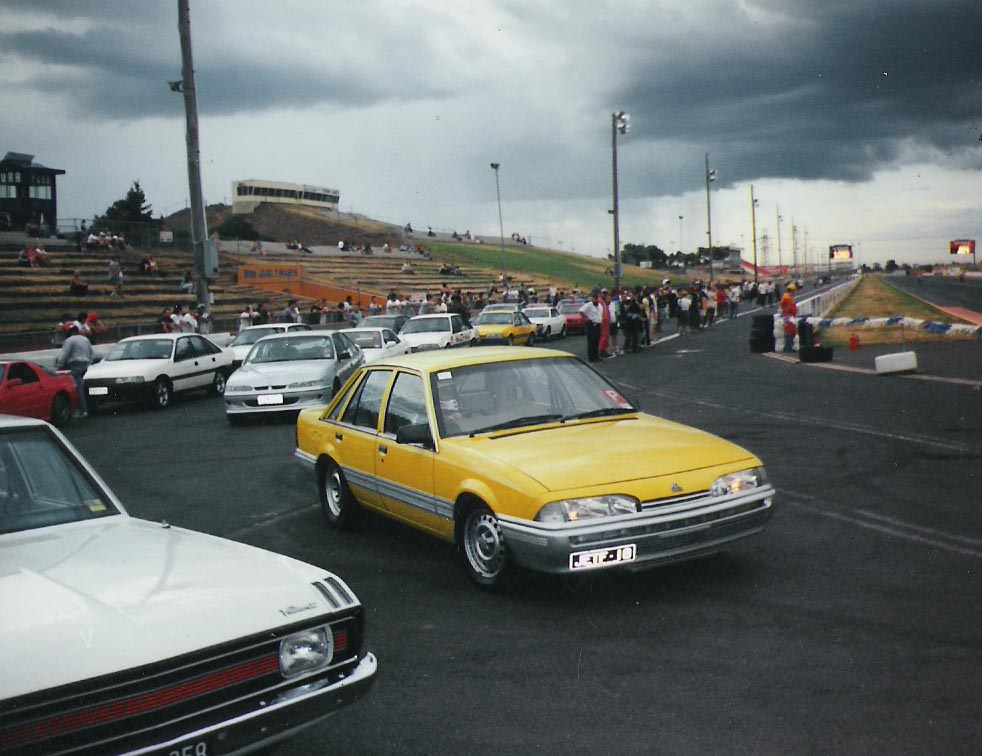
Legal Off Street Drag Racing night at Calder Park

Calder was also the first to host Superbike racing and Truck Racing, the trucks competing on both National and Thunderdome circuits in separate events. The AUSCAR series was developed to race on the Thunderdome.

The National Circuit's long front straight also features a drag strip, which was the home of the Australian National Drag Racing Championship for many years. There are also Legal Off Street Drag Racing every Friday night unless weather is unsuitable for racing.

Calder Park will continue long into the future, with one of its main focuses being the provision of a quality, affordable racing circuit within close proximity of the Melbourne CBD, for all Victorian motoring clubs and their grass roots membership.

— Bob Jane, (December 2004).

Drag Racing authority ANDRA national level events were absent for twelve years until 2013 due to a dispute between the governing body and circuit owner Bob Jane.

The first ever Drift Nationals held in March 2004 attracted over 8,000 spectators and added another inaugural event to the long list of new activities nurtured by Calder Park Raceway.

In 2021, Australian National Drag Racing Association announced the establishment of an annual Australian Drag Racing Championship series, with ASID as one of five venues across the country to host a round in the inaugural season.

== Disuse and revival ==
The Calder Park road circuit lay unused for nearly 15 years in the 2000s and 2010s. In 2023, the circuit, now owned by Bob Jane's son Rodney, was repaired and upgraded sufficiently to allow club and state-level motorsport events sanctioned by Motorsport Australia to resume. Further improvements are planned to the road circuit. Rodney Jane also hopes to one day bring back oval racing on the Thunderdome.

== Guns N' Roses concert ==
On 1 February 1993, Guns N' Roses performed at Calder Park as part of the Use Your Illusion Tour. The concert was fraught with controversy, including reports that security staff had prohibited patrons from bringing their own food, drinks and sunscreen into the venue; this most seriously affected a diabetic teenage girl, whose medication and carefully portioned food were confiscated. The weather was very hot on that day, reportedly 42 °C (108 °F), and many concertgoers went to the venue on special shuttle buses. The buses left the venue shortly after Guns N' Roses performed their final song, leaving many concertgoers stranded. There are reports that they walked all the way down the Calder Highway back to Melbourne, looting a 7-Eleven on the highway for food. An inquiry into the conditions was held, with the findings published by Ombudsman Victoria in May 1993. To this day, this was the last ever concert to be performed at Calder Park.

== Australian Grand Prix ==
Calder Park held the Australian Grand Prix each year from 1980 until 1984, after which the race became a round of the Formula One World Championship and was held at the Adelaide Street Circuit. In 1980, the race was open to cars from Formula One, Formula 5000 and Formula Pacific. For 1981–1984 the race was restricted to Formula Pacific / Formula Mondial cars.

Year	Driver	Car	Entrant
Australian Formula 1
1980	(Australia) Alan Jones	Williams FW07B Ford	Williams / Bob Jane T-Marts
Formula Pacific / Formula Mondial
1981	(Brazil) Roberto Moreno	Ralt RT4 Ford	National Panasonic
1982	(France) Alain Prost	Ralt RT4 Ford	Bob Jane T-Marts
1983	(Brazil) Roberto Moreno	Ralt RT4 Ford	Ignes Fridges
1984	(Brazil) Roberto Moreno	Ralt RT4 Ford	Ignes Fridges

== Touring Car round winners ==
Calder Park held 25 rounds of the Australian Touring Car Championship between 1969 and 2001. Allan Moffat has won the most ATCC rounds at Calder, winning five times (1970, 1973, 1976, 1977 and 1983).

Year	Driver	Car	Entrant
Improved Production
1969	(Australia) Bob Jane	Ford Mustang	Bob Jane Racing Team
1970	(Canada) Allan Moffat	Ford Boss 302 Mustang	Team Coca-Cola AMR
1971	(Australia) Norm Beechey	Holden HT Monaro GTS350	Shell Racing
1972	(Australia) Bob Jane	Chevrolet Camaro ZL-1	Bob Jane Racing
Group C
1973	(Canada) Allan Moffat	Ford XY Falcon GTHO Phase III	Ford Works Team
1974	(Australia) Peter Brock	Holden LJ Torana GTR XU-1	Holden Dealer Team
1975	(Australia) Allan Grice	Holden LH Torana SL/R 5000 L34	Craven Mild Racing
1976	(Canada) Allan Moffat	Ford XB Falcon GT Hardtop	Allan Moffat Racing
1977	(Canada) Allan Moffat	Ford XB Falcon GT Hardtop	Moffat Ford Dealers
1978	(Australia) Bob Morris	Holden LX Torana SS A9X Hatchback	Ron Hodgson Channel 7 Racing
1979	(Australia) Peter Brock	Holden LX Torana SS A9X Hatchback	Holden Dealer Team
1980	(Australia) Peter Brock	Holden VB Commodore	Marlboro Holden Dealer Team
1981	(Australia) Peter Brock	Holden VC Commodore	Marlboro Holden Dealer Team
1982	(Australia) Dick Johnson	Ford XD Falcon	Palmer Tube Mills
1983	(Canada) Allan Moffat	Mazda RX-7	Peter Stuyvesant International Racing
Group A
1985	(New Zealand) Jim Richards	BMW 635 CSi	JPS Team BMW
1986	(Australia) George Fury	Nissan Skyline DR30 RS	Peter Jackson Nissan Racing
1987	(Australia) Glenn Seton	Nissan Skyline DR30 RS	Peter Jackson Nissan Racing
1988	(Australia) Dick Johnson	Ford Sierra RS500	Shell Ultra-Hi Racing
Group 3A 5.0 Litre
1996	(Australia) Russell Ingall	Holden VR Commodore	Castrol Perkins Motorsport
V8 Supercars
1997	(Australia) Wayne Gardner	Holden VS Commodore	Wayne Gardner Racing
1998	(Australia) Craig Lowndes	Holden VS Commodore	Holden Racing Team
1999	(Australia) Mark Skaife	Holden VT Commodore	Holden Racing Team
2000	(New Zealand) Steven Richards	Holden VT Commodore	Gibson Motorsport
2001	(Australia) Paul Morris	Holden VT Commodore	Paul Morris Motorsport

== World Touring Car Championship ==
On 11 October 1987, Calder Park hosted Round 9 of the inaugural World Touring Car Championship on the combined road course and the newly built high banked Thunderdome. The race, known as the Bob Jane T-Marts 500, was won by England's Steve Soper and Belgian driver/journalist Pierre Dieudonné in a Eggenberger Motorsport built Ford Sierra RS500.

Year	Drivers	Car	Entrant
Group A
1987	(United Kingdom) Steve Soper (Belgium) Pierre Dieudonné	Ford Sierra RS500	(Switzerland) Ford Texaco Racing Team

== National championship rounds ==
Rounds of various Australian motor racing championship were held at Calder.

=== Australian Drivers' Championship ===
Year	Driver	Car	Entrant
Australian Formula 1 / Australian Formula 2
1974	(Australia) Max Stewart	Lola T300 Chevrolet	Max Stewart Motors
1975	(Australia) John McCormack	Elfin MR6 Repco Holden	Ansett Team Elfin
1976	(Australia) Max Stewart	Lola T400 Chevrolet	M Stewart
1977	(Australia) Jon Davison	Lola T332 Chevrolet	Jon Davison
Australian Formula 1
1978	(New Zealand) Graham McRae	McRae GM3 Chevrolet	Thomson Motor Auctions
1980	(Australia) Alfredo Costanzo	Lola T430 Chevrolet	Porsche Distributors
1982*	(Australia) Alfredo Costanzo	Tiga FA81 Ford	Porsche Cars Australia
1983*	(Australia) John Smith	Ralt RT4 Ford	John Smith
Formula Mondial
1984	(Australia) Alfredo Costanzo	Tiga FA81 Ford	Porsche Cars Australia
1986	(New Zealand) Ken Smith	Ralt RT4 Ford	Watson Motor Racing Pty Ltd
Australian Formula 2
1988	(Australia) Neil Israel	Magnum 863 Volkswagen	Magnum Racing Australia
Formula Holden
1996	(Australia) Jason Bright	Reynard 91D Holden	Birrana Racing
1997	(Australia) Jason Bright	Reynard 91D Holden	Garry & Warren Smith
1998	(New Zealand) Scott Dixon	Reynard 92D Holden	SH Racing
2001	(Australia) Rick Kelly	Reynard 94D Holden	Holden Young Lions

* The Calder round of both the 1982 and 1983 Australian Drivers' Championships were also the Australian Grand Prix. The round win was awarded to the highest placed domestic series driver.

=== Australian Sports Car Championship ===
Year	Driver	Car	Entrant
1974	(Australia) Lionel Ayers	Rennmax Repco	Lionel Ayers
1976	(Australia) Alan Hamilton	Porsche RSR Turbo	JAG Team Porsche
1977	(Australia) Alan Hamilton	Porsche 934 Turbo	Porsche Distributors
1978	(Australia) Ross Bond	Bolwell Nagari	Ross Bond
1979	(Australia) Ross Mathieson	Porsche Carrera	Ross Mathieson
1980	(Australia) John Latham	Porsche Turbo	John Latham
1981	(Australia) John Latham	Porsche 930 Turbo	John Latham
1984	(Australia) Chris Clearihan	Kaditcha Chevrolet	Steve Webb
1985	(Australia) John Bowe	Veskanda C1 Chevrolet	Bernie van Elsen
1986	(Australia) John Bowe	Veskanda C1 Chevrolet	Bernie van Elsen
1987	(Australia) Rusty French	Porsche 935	John Sands Racing

=== Australian Sports Sedan Championship ===
Year	Driver	Car	Entrant
1976	(Australia) Frank Gardner	Chevrolet Corvair	John Player Racing
1977	(Australia) Bob Jane	Holden Monaro HQ Chevrolet	Bob Jane 2UW Racing Team
1978	(New Zealand) Jim Richards	Ford XC Falcon Hardtop	Jim Richards Motor Racing
1979	(Australia) Tony Edmonson	Alfa Romeo Alfetta GTV Repco Holden	Donald Elliot
1980	(Australia) Tony Edmonson	Alfa Romeo Alfetta GTV Repco Holden	Donald Elliot
1981	(Australia) Tony Edmonson	Alfa Romeo Alfetta GTV Chevrolet	Donald Elliot
1997	(Australia) Kerry Baily	Toyota Celica Supra Chevrolet	Kerry Baily

=== Australian GT Championship ===
Year	Driver	Car	Entrant
1963	(Australia) Bob Jane	Jaguar E-Type	Bob Jane Jaguar-Fiat Sales
1982	(Australia) Alan Jones	Porsche 935/80	Porsche Cars Australia
1983	(Australia) Tony Edmonson	Alfa Romeo Alfetta GTV Chevrolet	Don Elliot
1984	(Australia) Peter Fitzgerald	Porsche Carrera RSR	Peter Fitzgerald/Stanilite Electronics
1985	(Australia) Kevin Bartlett	De Tomaso Pantera	Paul Halstead / The Toy Shop

=== Australian Nations Cup Championship ===
Year	Driver	Car	Entrant
2000	(Australia) Peter Fitzgerald	Porsche 996 GT3	Falken Tyres

== Track information ==
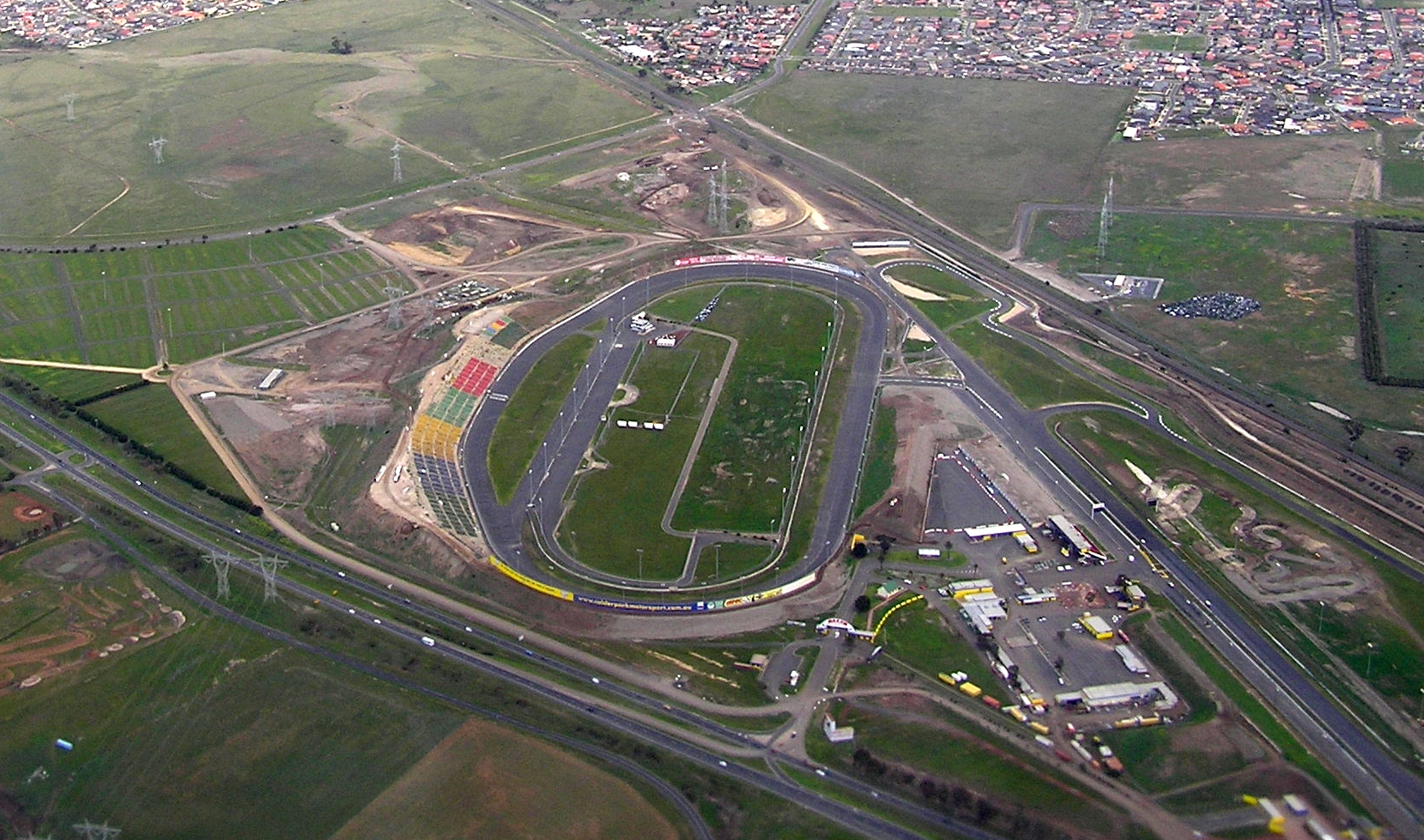
Aerial view of the Thunderdome and the bottom end of the road circuit from north

- Thunderdome (Oval circuit): 1.801 km (1.119 mi)
- National Circuit: Length 2.280 km (1.417 mi)
- Club Circuit:1.609 km (1.000 mi)
- Combined Road & Oval Circuit: 4.216 km (2.620 mi)

The first 100 metres of the Drag Strip was resurfaced in 2006 due to irregularities in the start line area, the strip reopened for the Legal Off Street Drag Racing event on Friday 17 November 2006.

=== Layout history ===
Calder Park Raceway layout history
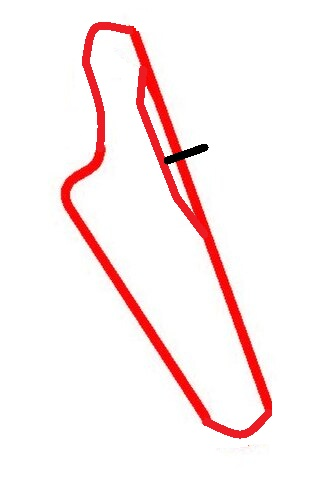
Original Circuit (1962–1983)

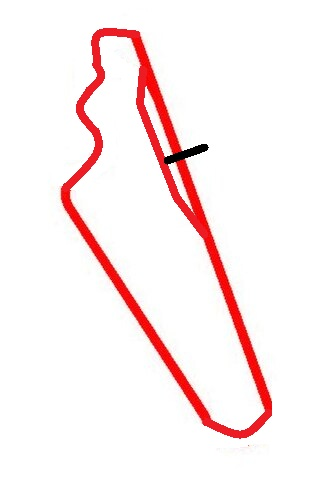
Main Circuit (1984–1985)

National Circuit (1986–present)

The oval track AKA "Thunderdome" (1987–present)

Combined Circuit (1987–present)

== Lap records ==
The fastest official race lap records at the Calder Park Raceway are listed as:

Category	Time	Driver	Vehicle	Date
National Circuit (1986–present): 2.280 km (1.417 mi)
Group A / C Sports Car (Over 3 litres)	0:52.690	(Australia) John Bowe	Veskanda C1 Chevrolet	19 October 1986
Formula Holden	0:53.0658	(New Zealand) Scott Dixon	Reynard 91D	28 April 1996
Group 3A Touring Car	0:56.141	(Australia) Craig Lowndes	Holden VR Commodore	28 April 1996
V8 Supercars	0:56.538	(Australia) Mark Skaife	Holden VX Commodore	15 July 2001
Super Touring	0:59.183	(Australia) Paul Morris	BMW 320i	22 June 1997
Group A Touring Car (2501–6000cc)	1:00.320	(Australia) Dick Johnson	Ford Sierra RS500	6 March 1988
Group A Touring Car (1601–2500cc)	1:01.400	(Australia) Glenn Seton	Nissan Skyline DR30 RS	1 June 1986
Group A Touring Car (Up to 1600cc)	1:07.990	(Australia) John Smith	Toyota Corolla AE82 Hatch	6 March 1988
Combined Circuit (1987–present): 4.216 km (2.620 mi)
Group A Touring Car (2501–6000cc)	1:45.030	(Australia) Andrew Miedecke	Ford Sierra RS500	11 October 1987
Group A Touring Car (1601–2500cc)	1:46.990	(Italy) Emanuele Pirro	BMW M3	11 October 1987
Group A Touring Car (1001–1600cc)	1:58.730	(New Zealand) John Faulkner	Toyota Corolla GT	11 October 1987
Main Circuit (1984–1985): 1.609 km (1.000 mi)
Formula Mondial	0:41.270	(Austria) Niki Lauda	Ralt RT4	18 November 1984
Group A Touring Car (3001–6000cc)	0:48.640	(New Zealand) Jim Richards	BMW 635 CSi	28 April 1985
Group A Touring Car (2001–3000cc)	0:48.730	(New Zealand) Robbie Francevic	Volvo 240T	28 April 1985
Original Circuit (1962–1984): 1.609 km (1.000 mi)
Formula One	0:36.900	(Australia) Alan Jones	Williams FW07B	16 November 1980
Formula Mondial	0:39.540	(Australia) Alan Jones	Ralt RT4	13 November 1983
Group 5	0:40.500	(Australia) Alan Jones	Porsche 935 K3	13 November 1983
Group A Sports Car (1.6 to 3 litres)	0:41.250	(Australia) Bap Romano	Romano WE84	29 April 1984
Australian Formula 2	0:42.420	(Australia) Peter Macrow	Cheetah Mk.8	29 April 1984
Group A Sports Car (Over 3 litres)	0:42.590	(Australia) Chris Clearihan	Kaditcha Chevrolet	29 April 1984
Group A Sports Car (Up to 1.6 litres)	0:44.150	(Australia) Ray Hanger	Rennmax Ford	29 April 1984
Group C Touring Car (3001–6000cc)	0:44.800	(Australia) Peter Brock	Holden VH Commodore	13 November 1983
Group C Touring Car (Up to 3000cc)	0:46.200	(Australia) George Fury	Nissan Bluebird turbo	6 February 1983
