= 1984 Australian Touring Car season =

25th season of Australian touring car racing

Seasons
- ← 1983 1985 →

The 1984 Australian Touring Car season was the 25th season of touring car racing in Australia, commencing in 1960 when the first Australian Touring Car Championship and the first Armstrong 500 (the forerunner of the present day Bathurst 1000) were contested. It was the last season in for the locally developed Group C category before the adoption of FIA's Group A rules from 1985.

Touring Cars competed at 17 race meetings in Australia during the 1984 season, contesting the following events:

- The seven rounds of the 1984 Australian Touring Car Championship (ATCC)
- The five rounds of the 1984 Australian Endurance Championship
- The four rounds of the 1984 AMSCAR series, held exclusively at Amaroo Park (each round consisted of 3 races).
- A touring car support round at the 1984 Australian Grand Prix meeting held at Calder Park. This was the last Australian Grand Prix held before the race became a part of the Formula One World Championship from 1985.

== Race calendar ==
Date	Series	Circuit	City / state	Winner	Team	Car	Report
18 February	ATCC Round 1	Sandown Raceway	Melbourne, Victoria	Peter Brock	Marlboro Holden Dealer Team	Holden VH Commodore SS	
4 March	AMSCAR Round 1	Amaroo Park	Sydney, New South Wales	Steve Masterton	Masterton Homes Pty. Ltd.	Ford XE Falcon	
11 March	ATCC Round 2	Symmons Plains Raceway	Launceston, Tasmania	Peter Brock	Marlboro Holden Dealer Team	Holden VH Commodore SS	
1 April	ATCC Round 3	Barbagallo Raceway	Perth, Western Australia	Allan Moffat	Peter Stuyvesant International Racing	Mazda RX-7	
8 April	AMSCAR Round 2	Amaroo Park	Sydney, New South Wales	Steve Masterton	Masterton Homes Pty. Ltd.	Ford XE Falcon	
13 May	ATCC Round 4	Surfers Paradise International Raceway	Surfers Paradise, Queensland	Dick Johnson	Palmer Tube Mills	Ford XE Falcon	
20 May	AMSCAR Round 3	Amaroo Park	Sydney, New South Wales	Bob Morris	Barry Jones	Mazda RX-7	
27 May	ATCC Round 5	Oran Park Raceway	Sydney, New South Wales	Bob Morris	Barry Jones	Mazda RX-7	
17 June	ATCC Round 6	Lakeside International Raceway	Brisbane, Queensland	George Fury	Nissan	Nissan Bluebird Turbo	
1 July	ATCC Round 7	Adelaide International Raceway	Adelaide, South Australia	Allan Grice	Roadways Racing	Holden VH Commodore SS	
8 July	AMSCAR Round 4	Amaroo Park	Sydney, New South Wales	Steve Masterton	Masterton Homes Pty. Ltd.	Ford XE Falcon	
5 August	Silastic 300; AEC Round 1	Amaroo Park	Sydney, New South Wales	Gary Scott	Nissan	Nissan Bluebird Turbo	
19 August	Valvoline 250; AEC Round 2	Oran Park Raceway	Sydney, New South Wales	Allan Moffat; Gregg Hansford	Peter Stuyvesant International Racing	Mazda RX-7	
9 September	Castrol 500; AEC Round 3	Sandown Raceway	Melbourne, Victoria	Peter Brock; Larry Perkins	Marlboro Holden Dealer Team	Holden VK Commodore	report
30 September	James Hardie 1000; AEC Round 4	Mount Panorama Circuit	Bathurst, New South Wales	Peter Brock; Larry Perkins	Marlboro Holden Dealer Team	Holden VK Commodore	report
27 October	Motorcraft 300; AEC Round 5	Surfers Paradise International Raceway	Surfers Paradise, Queensland	Peter Brock	Marlboro Holden Dealer Team	Holden VK Commodore	
18 November	Australian Grand Prix support race	Calder Park Raceway	Melbourne, Victoria	George Fury	Nissan	Nissan Bluebird Turbo	

== Australian Grand Prix support race ==
This race was a support event at the 1984 Australian Grand Prix meeting. The race, called the "Diners Club International Trophy Race" was open to both Group C and the new Group A touring cars and was won for the second year running by Nissan driver George Fury driving his Bluebird Turbo. For the second year in a row Peter Brock finished second in his HDT Commodore (his only loss in 4 races in the #05 Group C VK), with Warren Cullen third in his K-Mart sponsored Commodore. In a sign of things to come in 1985, Jim Richards was the winner of the Group A class in his JPS Team BMW 635 CSi.

This was the last ever competitive touring car race on the Australian mainland for the locally developed Group C cars. In late 1984 there was a race held for the Group C cars at the Baskerville Raceway in Tasmania where reportedly only six cars were in attendance. The Baskerville race was won by Allan Grice in his Roadways Racing VK Commodore.

Pos.	Driver	No.	Team	Car
1	(Australia) George Fury	15	Nissan	Nissan Bluebird Turbo
2	(Australia) Peter Brock	05	Marlboro Holden Dealer Team	Holden VK Commodore
3	(Australia) Warren Cullen	8	K-Mart Auto Racing	Holden VK Commodore
4	(Australia) John Harvey	25	Marlboro Holden Dealer Team	Holden VK Commodore
5	(Australia) Steve Masterton	2	Masterton Homes Pty. Ltd.	Ford XE Falcon
6	(Australia) Andrew Harris	9	K-Mart Auto Racing	Holden VH Commodore SS
7	(Australia) Murray Carter	18	Murray Carter	Mazda RX-7
DNF	(Australia) Peter McLeod	50	Slick 50 Racing	Mazda RX-7
