= 1983 Australian Touring Car season =

Racing season

Seasons
- ← 1982 1984 →

The 1983 Australian Touring Car season was the 24th season of touring car racing in Australia commencing from 1960 when the first Australian Touring Car Championship and the first Armstrong 500 (the forerunner of the present day Bathurst 1000) were contested.

The year was known for its political infighting over the homologation of parts by the Confederation of Australian Motorsport (CAMS). The new homologation grants for 1 August were announced on 29 May during the running of Round 7 of the Touring Car Championship at Sydney's Oran Park by ABC television commentators Will Hagon and John Smailes. This drew public criticism from the drivers who were only told about the grants post race. As a result of the way CAMS announced the homologation grants, both the Roadways and Nissan teams boycotted of the final round at Lakeside, despite Nissan driver George Fury going into the round as the championship leader and needing only to finish 9th in the race to claim the title. The boycott ultimately cost Fury the championship as his only rival Allan Moffat finished a safe 3rd to claim his fourth and last ATCC series win.

During the year CAMS also announced that the 1984 season would be the last for the locally developed Group C category which had been in place since 1973, before the move to the FIA's international Group A rules from 1985. This in effect took the homologation issue out of CAMS hands, with the FIA having the final say on all homologated cars and parts.

Touring Cars competed at 19 race meetings in Australia during the 1983 season, contesting the following events:

- The eight rounds of the 1983 Australian Touring Car Championship (ATCC)
- The six rounds of the 1983 Australian Endurance Championship, run concurrently with the 1983 Australian Endurance Championship of Makes
- The four rounds of the 1983 AMSCAR series, held exclusively at Amaroo Park in Sydney (each round consisted of three races).
- A touring car support race at the 1983 Australian Grand Prix meeting held at Calder Park in Melbourne.

== Race calendar ==
Date	Series	Circuit	City / state	Winner	Team	Car	Report
6 February	ATCC Round 1	Calder Park Raceway	Melbourne, Victoria	Allan Moffat	Peter Stuyvesant International Racing	Mazda RX-7	
20 February	ATCC Round 2	Sandown Raceway	Melbourne, Victoria	Allan Grice	STP Roadways Racing	Holden VH Commodore SS	
6 March	AMSCAR Round 1	Amaroo Park	Sydney, New South Wales	Terry Shiel	Terry Shiel	Mazda RX-7	
13 March	ATCC Round 3	Symmons Plains Raceway	Launceston, Tasmania	Allan Grice	STP Roadways Racing	Holden VH Commodore SS	
10 April	AMSCAR Round 2	Amaroo Park	Sydney, New South Wales	Terry Shiel	Terry Shiel	Mazda RX-7	
24 April	ATCC Round 4	Wanneroo Park	Perth, Western Australia	Allan Moffat	Peter Stuyvesant International Racing	Mazda RX-7	
1 May	ATCC Round 5	Adelaide International Raceway	Adelaide, South Australia	Peter Brock	Marlboro Holden Dealer Team	Holden VH Commodore SS	
15 May	ATCC Round 6	Surfers Paradise International Raceway	Surfers Paradise, Queensland	Allan Moffat	Peter Stuyvesant International Racing	Mazda RX-7	
22 May	AMSCAR Round 3	Amaroo Park	Sydney, New South Wales	Fred Gibson	Nissan	Nissan Bluebird Turbo	
29 May	ATCC Round 7	Oran Park Raceway	Sydney, New South Wales	Allan Moffat	Peter Stuyvesant International Racing	Mazda RX-7	
19 June	ATCC Round 8	Lakeside International Raceway	Brisbane, Queensland	Peter Brock	Marlboro Holden Dealer Team	Holden VH Commodore SS	
10 July	AMSCAR Round 4	Amaroo Park	Sydney, New South Wales	Terry Shiel	Terry Shiel	Mazda RX-7	
7 August	Silastic 300; AEC Round 1 AECM Round 1	Amaroo Park	Sydney, New South Wales	George Fury	Nissan	Nissan Bluebird Turbo	
21 August	Valvoline 250; AEC Round 2 AECM Round 2	Oran Park Raceway	Sydney, New South Wales	George Fury	Nissan	Nissan Bluebird Turbo	
11 September	Castrol 400; AEC Round 3 AECM Round 3	Sandown Raceway	Melbourne, Victoria	Allan Moffat	Peter Stuyvesant International Racing	Mazda RX-7	report
2 October	James Hardie 1000; AEC Round 4 AECM Round 4	Mount Panorama Circuit	Bathurst, New South Wales	John Harvey; Peter Brock; Larry Perkins	Marlboro Holden Dealer Team	Holden VH Commodore SS	report
27 October	Gold Coast 300; AEC Round 5 AECM Round 5	Surfers Paradise International Raceway	Surfers Paradise, Queensland	Allan Grice	STP Roadways Racing	Holden VH Commodore SS	
13 November	Berri Fruit Juices Trophy; Australian Grand Prix support race	Calder Park Raceway	Melbourne, Victoria	George Fury	Nissan	Nissan Bluebird Turbo	
20 November	Humes Guardrail 300; AEC Round 6 AECM Round 6	Adelaide International Raceway	Adelaide, South Australia	Peter Brock	Marlboro Holden Dealer Team	Holden VH Commodore SS	

== Australian Grand Prix support race ==
A Group C race was a support event at the 1983 Australian Grand Prix meeting at Calder Park. The race, known as the "Berri Fruit Juices City of Melbourne Touring Car Trophy", was run over 40 laps and to add interest, meeting and circuit promotor Bob Jane (a former twice ATCC champion and 4 time Great Race winner) included a compulsory pitstop from laps 18-27 to change at least two tyres. George Fury took his first touring car sprint race win driving his Nissan Bluebird Turbo. Peter Brock finished second in his Holden Dealer Team Commodore (the first time his mid-1983 spec Commodore had actually finished a race having failed at the Sandown, Bathurst and Surfers enduros), with Warren Cullen finishing in 3rd place in his Holden Commodore.

Pos.	Driver	No.	Team	Car
1	(Australia) George Fury	15	Nissan	Nissan Bluebird Turbo
2	(Australia) Peter Brock	05	Marlboro Holden Dealer Team	Holden VH Commodore SS
3	(Australia) Warren Cullen	22	Cullen Automotive Industries	Holden VH Commodore SS
4	(Australia) Murray Carter	18	Valentine Greetings	Mazda RX-7
5	(Australia) Larry Perkins	25	Marlboro Holden Dealer Team	Holden VH Commodore SS
6	(Australia) Garry Rogers	34	Soundwave Discos	Holden VH Commodore SS
7	(Australia) Jim Richards	31	JPS Team BMW	BMW 635 CSi
