= AMSCAR =

Touring car racing series in Australia (1979–1997)

- Category: Touring cars
- Country: Australia
- Inaugural season: 1979
- Folded: 1997
- Last Drivers' champion: (Australia) Mal Rose

AMSCAR (Amaroo Saloon Cars) was a touring car series held in Australia between 1979 and 1997, based at Amaroo Park in Sydney.

== Background ==
One of the features of Amaroo Park's history was their promoted touring car series, created by Amaroo's promoters, the Australian Racing Drivers Club (ARDC). Popular with spectators and easy for Sydney's Channel 7 to telecast, it became the backbone of the Sydney touring car scene, a scene which once consisted mostly of privateers, who have largely disappeared since Amaroo closed. On many occasions these events featured larger grid numbers than did the rounds of the national level Australian Touring Car Championship. This was mostly as the large number of Sydney privateers who usually filled the grid in the nationally televised (by Ch.7) Bathurst 1000, rarely raced outside of NSW or South East Queensland due to limited budgets with most usually only making a single trek to Melbourne for the traditional pre-Bathurst 1000 race, the Sandown 500, and the end of season support race at the Australian Grand Prix in Adelaide from 1985 to 1995.

The AMSCAR Series had its origins in Amaroo's own Sun-7 Chesterfield Series for touring cars, first held in 1971 and was won by Sydney's Lakis Manticas driving a Morris Cooper S. This would continue, under various names relating to series sponsorship, through to 1981, with a 3-litre maximum engine capacity limit being applied from 1975 to 1980. For 1981 the Australian Racing Drivers Club increased the maximum engine capacity limit of cars competing in their series to 3.5 litres. This allowed the participation of the 3.5-litre BMW 635 CSi of JPS Team BMW, much to the displeasure of most competing teams, especially those racing the 3.0L Ford Capri's which were well suited to the tight track and had come to dominate the series since 1975. Despite this, young Sydney driver Steve Masterton would win the 1981 Better Brakes 3.5 Litre Series driving his Ford Capri Mk.II from the JPS BMW of Allan Grice.

== History ==
A "Rothmans AMSCAR Series" for touring cars was held in addition to the Sun-7 Chesterfield Series at Amaroo Park in 1979 for a reported A$60,000 in prize money, about $50,000 more than for the ATCC at the time. The second round of the series saw the one-off appearance of long time Ford driver Allan Moffat in a Ron Hodgson Motors Holden LX Torana SS A9X Hatchback. The series was then not held in 1980 and 1981. Fears that the growing number of Sydney-based privateers moving into outright class cars would result in a sharp decline in grid numbers prompted the ARDC to remove the 3.5-litre capacity limit for the 1982 series, which was promoted as the Better Brakes AMSCAR Series. This allowed the V8 powered Holden Commodores, Ford Falcons and Chevrolet Camaros, as well as the V12 Jaguar XJS, to compete in the series alongside the under 3.5-litre cars such as the BMW 635 CSi, the Ford Capris and the growing list of rotary powered Mazda RX-7s, as well as the factory (Gibson) Nissan Bluebird turbos. As the outright cars were proving more popular with spectators, it was seen as an attempt at attracting the headline ATCC teams (such as the Holden Dealer Team, Dick Johnson Racing, Allan Moffat Racing and Roadways Racing) to the AMSCAR Series.

In the early Group C years of the AMSCAR series, several Sydney based drivers who regularly competed in the annual four round, three race per round series became household names through the national telecast on Channel 7 (at the time, Seven's only touring car telecasts were from Amaroo, Calder Park Raceway in Melbourne, and Bathurst as the ABC was main broadcast host of the ATCC until the end of 1984). This was helped by most of the major ATCC teams at the time usually not competing in the series. Drivers such as Amscar series winners Steve Masterton and Terry Shiel, as well as Terry Finnigan, Garry Willmington, Brian Callaghan, Barry Jones, and the late Mike Burgmann got national TV exposure they would otherwise have struggled to get in the ATCC, or had ATCC headline drivers like Peter Brock (HDT), Dick Johnson, Allan Moffat, Allan Grice (Roadways), and Jim Richards (JPS Team BMW) been regular competitors, although Grice (whose own home in Sydney was and is within a stones throw of the old Amaroo circuit) did win the 1982 series, while Johnson contested limited rounds from 1982 to 1984. Jim Richards in the BMW was a regular competitor from 1983 and placed 3rd in the 1984 series (Amaroo was the JPS Team BMW's test track until the teams demise at the end of 1987).

In Group C, the factory backed Nissan team also contested the series with Sydney-based team driver Fred Gibson (the Bathurst 500 winner in 1967 with Harry Firth in a Ford XR Falcon GT) and his wife Christine (regarded as the "fastest female in Australia") driving the team's second Bluebird turbo and its powerful, but evil handling, front-wheel drive Nissan Pulsar EXA respectively. Fred Gibson's win in Round 3 of the 1983 series was the first win in Australian touring car racing for a turbo powered car, and Nissan's first turbo charged touring car win anywhere in the world. When Gibson retired from driving at the end of 1983, he would be replaced from 1984 in the Bluebird by Queenslander Gary Scott, the son of former open-wheel star, the late Glyn Scott, while Christine Gibson continued to drive the Pulsar EXA until she joined her husband in retirement at the end of 1984.

It was only from the beginning of the "Group A" category in Australia in 1985 that the headline teams started appearing in the series on a more regular basis, with part of the reason being that as Group A was new to Australia in 1985, the AMSCAR Series gave teams valuable testing under race conditions (also because from 1985 Amaroo would hold an annual round of the ATCC). Frank Gardner's JPS Team BMW and its drivers Jim Richards and Tony Longhurst dominated from 1985 to 1987 (Richards in the 635 CSi was unbeaten at Amaroo in 1985 winning all 12 AMSCAR races, the ATCC round and the Endurance Championship race), while Gibson Motorsport, first with Nissan and later with Holden, also contested the series in the later years of Group A and into the new 5.0L V8 formula introduced in 1993, with Jim Richards winning in the team's Nissan Skyline GT-R in 1992 while Mark Skaife won for Gibson driving a Holden VP Commodore in 1993. Other top line teams to contest the AMSCAR series after the switch to Group A were Peter Brock's Holden Dealer Team (later known as Mobil 1 Racing), Dick Johnson Racing, 1988 series winner Colin Bond's Caltex CXT Racing Team, Tony Longhurst's Benson & Hedges team (evolved from JPS Team BMW), as well as Robbie Francevic's Volvo team.

=== Demise ===
The increasing national popularity of the Australian Touring Car Championship, improvements in Channel 7's ATCC telecast, and the 1991 economic recession which saw a number of privateer teams only racing in the two ATCC rounds in Sydney and the Bathurst 1000, all gradually reduced the grids until the AMSCAR Series was discontinued after the 1993 season. It was revived in 1997 and held at the ARDC's two circuits, Amaroo Park and Eastern Creek, but with the major teams holding exclusivity to V8 Supercar events, the mostly Sydney-based privateers were not numerous enough to make the series viable and the series folded after 1997.

== Broadcast ==
During Seven's telecasts of the AMSCAR series at Amaroo, many minor race series for other CAMS categories were also telecast, including: Sports Sedans, Formula Fords, Formula Vee, Sports Cars, Appendix J Touring Cars, and Series Production cars, with many of the categories running their own series at Amaroo outside of the national championship series. Seven's commentators for the AMSCAR series generally included Mike Raymond (also the telecast Producer), Garry Wilkinson, Evan Green, and later Neil Crompton and Peter McKay, with various guest appearances by drivers not competing on a particular day including Dick Johnson, Peter Brock, Bob Morris, Allan Grice and Steve Masterton.

== Winners ==
The following table lists the winners of the annual AMSCAR Series.

Year	Series name	Driver	Car	Team
Group C
1979	Rothmans AMSCAR Series	(Australia) Bob Morris	Holden LX Torana SS 5000 A9X	Ron Hodgson Motors
1980 – 1981	Not held			
1982	Better Brakes AMSCAR Series	(Australia) Allan Grice	Holden VH Commodore SS	Re-Car Racing
1983	Better Brakes AMSCAR Series	(Australia) Terry Shiel	Mazda RX-7	Eurocars (Northside) Pty Ltd
1984	Better Brakes AMSCAR Series	(Australia) Steve Masterton	Ford XE Falcon	Masterton Homes
Group A
1985	Better Brakes / AMSCAR Series	(New Zealand) Jim Richards	BMW 635 CSi	JPS Team BMW
1986	Better Brakes / AMSCAR Series	(Australia) Tony Longhurst	BMW 325i	JPS Team BMW
1987	James Hardie Industries Iplex AMSCAR Series	(New Zealand) Jim Richards	BMW M3	JPS Team BMW
1988	James Hardie Building Products AMSCAR Series	(Australia) Colin Bond	Ford Sierra RS500	Colin Bond Racing
1989	James Hardie Building Products AMSCAR Series	(Australia) Tony Longhurst	Ford Sierra RS500	LoGaMo Racing
1990	James Hardie Building Products AMSCAR Series	(Australia) Tony Longhurst	Ford Sierra RS500	LoGaMo Racing
1991	AMSCAR Series	(Australia) Tony Longhurst	BMW M3 Evolution	LoGaMo Racing
1992	ARDC AMSCAR Series	(New Zealand) Jim Richards	Nissan Skyline R32 GT-R	Gibson Motorsport
Group 3A 5.0L Touring Cars
1993	Aurora AFX AMSCAR Series	(Australia) Mark Skaife	Holden VP Commodore	Gibson Motorsport
1994 – 1996	Not held			
1997^{1}	ARDC AMSCAR Sedan Series	(Australia) Mal Rose	Holden VR Commodore	Mal Rose Racing

Notes

- ^1 – Amaroo Park only hosted Round 2 of the four round 1997 ARDC AMSCAR Sedan Series, with the other three rounds held at Eastern Creek Racway.

== Multiple winners ==
Tony Longhurst achieved more AMSCAR series wins than any other driver, with success in 1986, 1989, 1990 and 1991. Each series win from 1988 to 1990 was attained with a Ford Sierra RS500, these three wins being the most for a single model of car.

=== By driver ===
Wins	Driver	Years
4	(Australia) Tony Longhurst	1986, 1989, 1990, 1991
3	(New Zealand) Jim Richards	1985, 1987, 1992

=== By team ===
Wins	Team
3	JPS Team BMW
3	LoGaMo Racing
2	Gibson Motorsport

=== By manufacturer ===
Wins	Manufacturer
4	Ford
4	BMW
4	Holden

== Event sponsors ==
- 1979: Rothmans
- 1982–86: Better Brakes
- 1987–90: James Hardie
- 1993: Aurora AFX
