= 1984 Australian Endurance Championship =

Motor racing competition

Seasons
- ← 1983 1985 →

The 1984 Australian Endurance Championship was a CAMS sanctioned motor racing competition open to Group C Touring Cars. The championship, which was the fourth Australian Endurance Championship, was contested over a five-round series. Titles were awarded for both Drivers and Makes with Allan Moffat winning the Drivers title and Mazda winning the Makes award.

== Calendar ==
The championship was contested over a five-round series with one race per round.

Rd.	Race title	Circuit	City / state	Date	Winner	Car	Team	Report
1	Silastic 300	Amaroo Park	Sydney, New South Wales	5 August	(Australia) Gary Scott	Nissan Bluebird Turbo	Nissan	
2	Valvoline 250	Oran Park	Sydney, New South Wales	19 August	(Canada) Allan Moffat (Australia) Gregg Hansford	Mazda RX-7	Peter Stuyvesant International Racing	
3	Castrol 500	Sandown	Melbourne, Victoria	9 September	(Australia) Peter Brock (Australia) Larry Perkins	Holden VK Commodore	Marlboro Holden Dealer Team	Report
4	James Hardie 1000	Mount Panorama	Bathurst, New South Wales	30 September	(Australia) Peter Brock (Australia) Larry Perkins	Holden VK Commodore	Marlboro Holden Dealer Team	Report
5	Motorcraft 300	Surfers Paradise	Surfers Paradise, Queensland	4 November	(Australia) Peter Brock	Holden VK Commodore	Marlboro Holden Dealer Team	

== Classes ==
Cars competed in two classes:

- Up to 3000 cc
- Over 3000 cc

== Points system ==
Drivers Championship points were awarded to the drivers of the cars filling the first twenty places in each round, with the actual points allocation dependent on the class in which the car was competing.

Position	1st	2nd	3rd	4th	5th	6th	7th	8th	9th	10th	11th	12th	13th	14th	15th	16th	17th	18th	19th	20th
Points for Up to 3000 cc class car	30	27	24	21	19	17	15	14	13	12	11	10	9	8	7	6	5	4	3	2
Points for Over 3000 cc class car	25	23	20	17	15	13	11	10	9	8	7	6	5	4	3	2	1	0	0	0

Makes Championship points were awarded on the same basis but only for the highest scoring car of each make.

== Championship results ==
=== Drivers ===
Position	Driver	No.	Car	Entrant	Amaroo	Oran Pk	Sandown	Bathurst	Surfers	Total
1	(Canada) Allan Moffat	43 & 42	Mazda RX-7	Peter Stuyvesant International	-	12.5	23	20	23	78.5
2	(Australia) Gregg Hansford	43 & 42	Mazda RX-7	Peter Stuyvesant International	-	12.5	23	20	20	75.5
3	(Australia) Peter Brock	05	Holden VH Commodore SS; Holden VK Commodore SS	Marlboro Holden Dealer Team	DNF	-	25	25	25	75
4	(Australia) John Harvey	05 & 25	Holden VH Commodore SS; Holden VK Commodore SS	Marlboro Holden Dealer Team	-	DNF	20	23	13	56
5	(Australia) Larry Perkins	05	Holden VK Commodore SS	Marlboro Holden Dealer Team	DNS	-	25	25	-	50

Note: Only the top five pointscorers are shown.

=== Makes ===
Position	Make	Car	Amaroo	Oran Pk	Sandown	Bathurst	Surfers	Total
1	Mazda	RX-7	20	25	23	20	23	111
2	Holden	VH Commodore SS; VK Commodore SS	23	10	25	25	25	108
3	Ford	XE Falcon; XD Falcon	9	23	11	11	9	63
4	Nissan	Bluebird Turbo; Pulsar EXA	25	-	-	2	-	27
5	BMW	BMW 635 CSi (Group C & Group A)	-	20	-	3	-	23
