= 1984 Castrol 500 =

Australian motor racing event

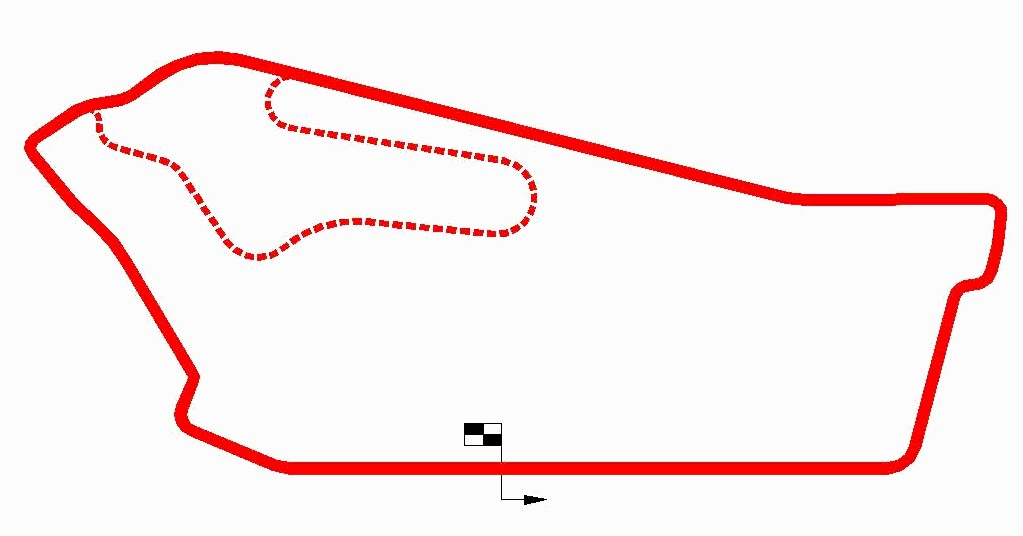
Layout of the Sandown Raceway international circuit (1984-1998)

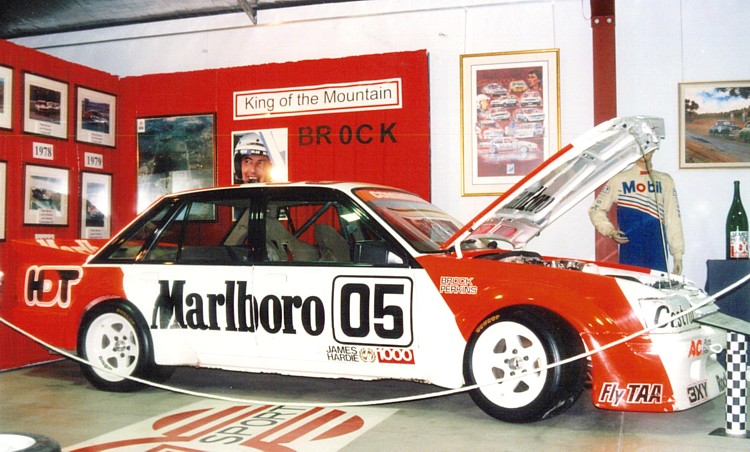
The race winning Brock/Perkins Holden Commodore

The 1984 Castrol 500 was an endurance motor race staged at the Sandown Park circuit in Victoria, Australia on 9 September 1984. The event was open to Group C Touring Cars, competing in two engine capacity classes, Up to 3000cc and Over 3000cc. It also included a class for Group A cars which were to replace Group C cars in Australian Touring Car racing in 1985. The race, which was held over a distance of 503 km, was Round 3 of the 1984 Australian Endurance Championship.

This was the first Sandown endurance race where the distance was 500 km and the first of five races on the new 3.878 km (1.928 mi) long 'International Circuit'. Prior to 1984 the Sandown Enduro had been held over distances including: 6 Hours (1964–65), 3 Hours (1968–69), 250 miles (1970–75) and 400 km (1976-83), all held on the old 3.100 km (1.926 mi) circuit. The meeting also saw the opening of the new International standard Sandown Park with changes including the relocating of the pits from between turns 1 and 2 to a new $600,000 pit complex at the start of the main straight which was long enough to accommodate over 40 cars with lock-up garages for each pit. Other changes included lengthening and re-profiling of the circuit to the minimum length required for an International circuit of 3.9 km, primarily by the inclusion of an 800-metre infield section, which for the first time saw the circuit cross to the inside of the venue's horse racing track.

Due to the new length of 500 km, teams were required to have at least two drivers per car as no one driver was permitted to complete the entire distance without a break. This saw most teams use their upcoming Bathurst pairings.

== Qualifying ==
Nissan driver George Fury sat on pole in his Bluebird Turbo with a time of 1:46.2 for the new track. Alongside Fury in a brand new Roadways Racing Holden VK Commodore was Allan Grice who was only 0.1 behind. Filling out the second row of the grid was newly crowned Australian Touring Car Champion Dick Johnson in his "Greens-Tuf" Ford XE Falcon, and the Holden Dealer Team VK Commodore of Peter Brock. The third row of the grid consisted of the top two finishers from 1983. Winner Allan Moffat in his Mazda RX-7 and Jim Richards in the JPS Team BMW 635 CSI.

Fury's pole time remains the fastest ever recorded time by a touring car of the 3.878 km International Circuit.

1982 Australian Sports Car Champion Chris Clearihan, who was to have co-driven with David Grose in a Mazda RX-7, was excluded from the meeting after qualifying following an altercation in the pits with Allan Moffat in which punches were allegedly thrown. Moffat and Clearihan had tangled out on the circuit with a confrontation following in the pits. After Clearihan's exclusion, the 1983 Sports Car Champion Peter Hopwood who was driving in the final round of the 1984 Australian Drivers' Championship at the meeting, was given permission to take his place in the RX-7.

== Race ==
Driving with regular co-driver and HDT team manager Larry Perkins, Peter Brock won his 9th and last Sandown enduro. The pair finishing a lap ahead of the Moffat/Gregg Hansford RX-7 with the second HDT Commodore of John Harvey and new team recruit David Parsons finishing 3rd. Early race leader Dick Johnson suffered gearbox failure on lap 37, attributed to the increased strain from the tight new infield section, while pole sitter Fury was out on lap 32 with head gasket failure. The only other car to lead the race, the Roadways Racing VK Commodore of Grice/Steve Harrington, stopped with a broken gearbox while running 2nd on lap 103. Grice had the consolation on the day of not only winning the final round of the 1984 Australian GT Championship (and subsequently his third Sports Sedan/GT national title) in his Chevrolet Monza, but also setting the fastest lap of the Sandown 500 in his new Commodore before it expired. As this was the only Group C touring car race held on the new 3.9 km long international circuit, Grice's lap of 1:48.3 remains the category lap record for the circuit.

Dean Lindstrom and Larry Kogge won the Up to 3000cc class and finished 9th outright in their RX-7, 18 laps down on Brock/Perkins, while the winner of the new Group A category was Peter Williamson and Charlie O'Brien who finished 6th outright driving an ex-BTCC Toyota Celica Supra formerly driven by Win Percy.

== Results ==
=== Top 10 Qualifiers ===
Pos.	Driver	No	Car	Entrant	Time
Pole	(Australia) George Fury	15	Nissan	Nissan Bluebird Turbo	1:46.2
2	(Australia) Allan Grice	6	Roadways Racing	Holden VK Commodore	1:46.3
3	(Australia) Dick Johnson	17	Palmer Tube Mills	Ford XE Falcon	1:46.9
4	(Australia) Peter Brock	05	Marlboro Holden Dealer Team	Holden VK Commodore	1:47.0
5	(Canada) Allan Moffat	2	Peter Stuyvesant International Racing	Mazda RX-7	1:47.5
6	(New Zealand) Jim Richards	31	JPS Team BMW	BMW 635 CSi	1:47.8
7	(Australia) Warren Cullen	8	K. Mart Auto Racing	Holden VK Commodore	1:48.7
8	(Australia) Ron Harrop	9	K. Mart Auto Racing	Holden VH Commodore SS	1:49.0
9	(Australia) John Harvey	25	Marlboro Holden Dealer Team	Holden VK Commodore	1:49.1
10	(Australia) Murray Carter	18	Valentine Greetings	Mazda RX-7	1:49.9

=== Race ===
Position	Drivers	No.	Car	Entrant	Class	Laps
1	Peter Brock; Larry Perkins	05	Holden VK Commodore	Marlboro Holden Dealer Team	Over 3000cc	129
2	Allan Moffat; Gregg Hansford	43	Mazda RX-7	Peter Stuyvesant International Racing	Over 3000cc	128
3	John Harvey; David Parsons	25	Holden VK Commodore	Marlboro Holden Dealer Team	Over 3000cc	127
4	Murray Carter; John Goss	18	Mazda RX-7	Valentine Greetings	Over 3000cc	125
5	Bernie Stack; Wayne Clift; Jim Keogh	20	Holden VH Commodore SS	Jim Keogh	Over 3000cc	122
6	Peter Williamson; Charlie O'Brien	77	Toyota Celica Supra	Peter Williamson Toyota	Group A	119
7	Alf Grant; Craig Harris	27	Ford XD Falcon	Bryan Byrt Ford	Over 3000cc	118
8	Tony Mulvihill; Brian Nightingale	51	Mazda RX-7	Tokico	Over 3000cc	113
9	Dean Lindstrom; Larry Kogge	74	Mazda RX-7	Dean Lindstrom	Up to 3000cc	111
10	John Craft; Les Grose	56	Ford Capri Mk III	Hulcraft Autos	Group A	109
11	Brian Bolwell; Ray Cutchie	28	Ford Escort Mk II	Brian Bolwell	Up to 3000cc	107
12	Warren Cullen; Alan Jones	8	Holden VK Commodore	K. Mart Auto Racing	Over 3000cc	102
13	Ken Harrison; Ian Wells	80	Ford Escort Mk II	Ken Harrison	Up to 3000cc	96
14	Martin Power; Philip Larmour	49	Triumph Dolomite Sprint	Martin Power	Up to 3000cc	95
NC	Rusty French; Geoff Russell	10	Holden VH Commodore SS	John Sands Racing	Over 3000cc	91
DNF	Allan Grice; Steve Harrington	6	Holden VK Commodore	Roadways Racing	Over 3000cc	103
DNF	Colin Bond; Peter Fitzgerald	70	Alfa Romeo GTV6	Network Alfa	Group A	93
DNF	Graham Lusty; John Lusty	21	Holden VH Commodore SS	Lusty Engineering Pty Ltd	Over 3000cc	84
DNF	Lawrie Nelson; Peter Jones	64	Ford Capri Mk III	Capri Components	Up to 3000cc	76
DNF	Jim Richards; Tony Longhurst	31	BMW 635 CSi	JPS Team BMW	Over 3000cc	72
DNF	John White; Les Szreniawski	61	Isuzu Gemini	John White	Up to 3000cc	70
DNF	John Bundy; Barry Jones	39	Mazda RX-7	J. Bundy	Over 3000cc	64
DNF	Peter McLeod; Graeme Bailey	50	Mazda RX-7	Petrolon Slick 50	Over 3000cc	57
DNF	Peter Janson; Garry Rogers	3	Holden VH Commodore SS	Cadbury Schweppes Pty Ltd	Over 3000cc	46
DNF	Jim Keogh; Terry Shiel	19	Holden VH Commodore SS	Jim Keogh	Over 3000cc	44
DNF	Andrew Harris; Ron Harrop	9	Holden VH Commodore SS	K. Mart Auto Racing	Over 3000cc	43
DNF	Bill O'Brien; Garry Cooke	30	Ford XD Falcon	Everlast Battery Service	Over 3000cc	41
DNF	Dick Johnson; John French	17	Ford XE Falcon	Palmer Tube Mills	Over 3000cc	37
DNF	George Fury; Gary Scott	15	Nissan Bluebird Turbo	Nissan	Over 3000cc	32
DNF	Steve Masterton; Phil Ward	2	Ford XE Falcon	Masterton Homes Pty Ltd	Over 3000cc	14
DNF	Colin Campbell; John Faulkner	38	Holden VH Commodore SS	Bayswater Auto Wreckers	Over 3000cc	9
DNS	Chris Clearihan	32	Mazda RX-7	Berklee Exhausts	Over 3000cc	

== Statistics ==
- Pole Position – #15 George Fury - Nissan Bluebird Turbo – 1:46.2
- Fastest Lap – #6 Allan Grice - Holden VK Commodore – 1:48.3 (new lap record)

Preceded by 1983 Castrol 400	Sandown 500; 1984	Succeeded by 1985 Castrol 500
