= 1983 Australian Endurance Championship of Makes =

The 1983 Australian Endurance Championship of Makes was a CAMS sanctioned national motor racing title open to Group C Touring Cars. The championship was contested over a six-round series with all rounds run concurrently with those of the 1983 Australian Endurance Championship.

Holden and Mazda jointly won the championship on 131 points each. Holden had three wins, a second, a third, and a ninth. Mazda won one race, with two seconds and three thirds. Nissan was the only other outright race winner, having won the opening two rounds.

== Calendar ==
Rd.	Race title	Circuit	Date	Winner	Car	Team	Report
1	Silastic 300	Amaroo Park	7 August	(Australia) George Fury	Nissan Bluebird Turbo	Nissan	
2	Oran Park 250	Oran Park	21 August	(Australia) George Fury	Nissan Bluebird Turbo	Nissan Motor Co.	
3	Castrol 400	Sandown	11 September	(Canada) Allan Moffat	Mazda RX-7	Peter Stuyvesant International Racing	Report
4	James Hardie 1000	Mount Panorama	2 October	(Australia) John Harvey (Australia) Peter Brock (Australia) Larry Perkins	Holden VH Commodore SS	Marlboro Holden Dealer Team	Report
5	Motorcraft 300	Surfers Paradise	30 October	(Australia) Allan Grice	Holden VH Commodore SS	STP Roadways Racing	
6	Humes Guardrail 300	Adelaide International Raceway	20 November	(Australia) Peter Brock	Holden VH Commodore SS	Marlboro Holden Dealer Team	

== Class structure ==
Cars competed in two engine displacement classes:

- Up to 3000cc
- Over 3000cc

== Points structure ==
Championship points were awarded at each round according to the outright position attained by the best placed car of each make:

Outright Position	1	2	3	4	5	6	7	8	9	10	11	12	13	14	15	16	17	18	19	20
Up to 3000cc	30	27	24	21	19	17	15	14	13	12	11	10	9	8	7	6	5	4	3	2
Over 3000cc	25	23	20	17	15	13	11	10	9	8	7	6	5	4	3	2	1	0	0	0

== Results ==
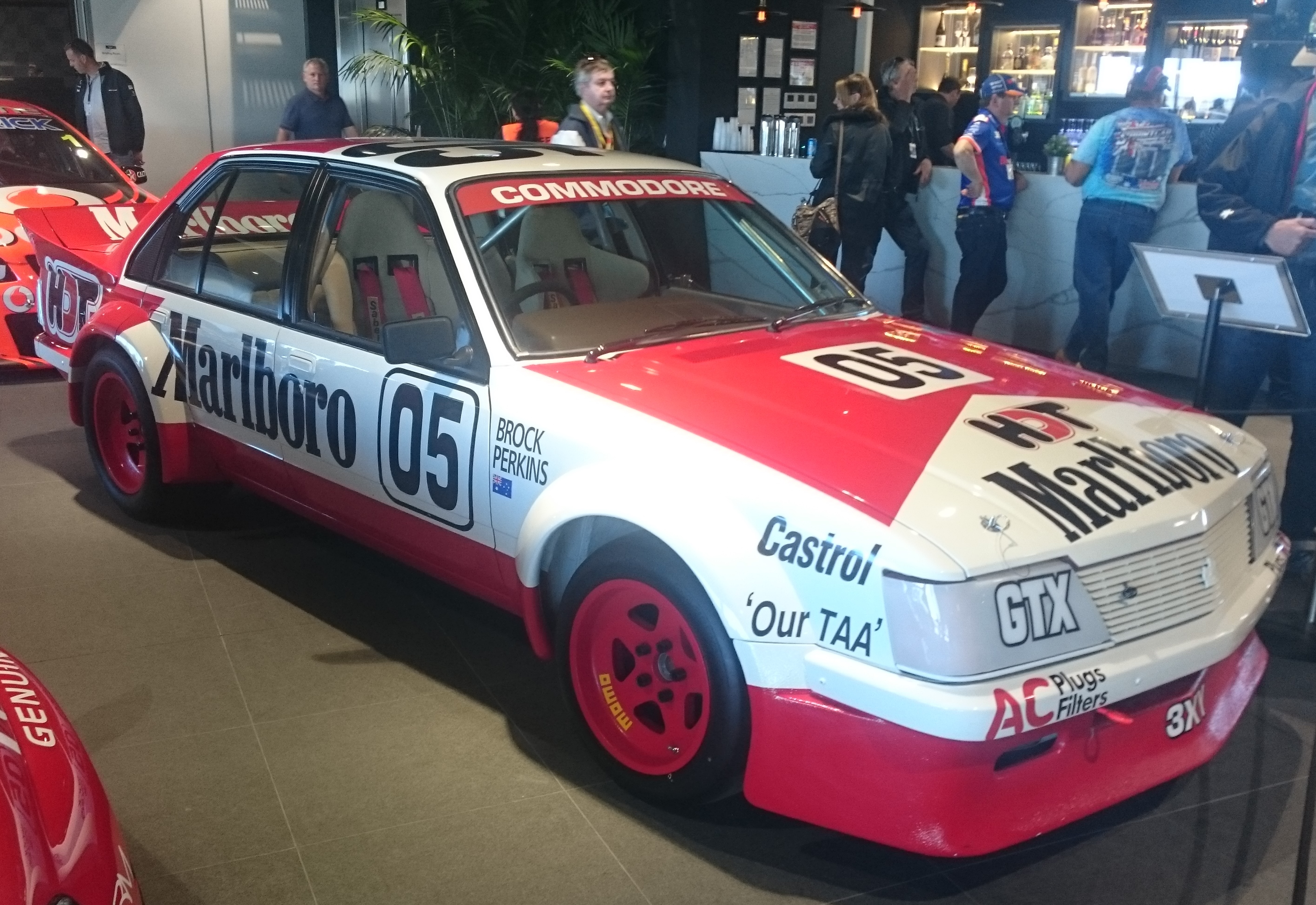
The title was won jointly by Mazda and Holden, the latter competing with its Commodore VH model.

Position	Make	Car	Rd 1	Rd 2	Rd 3	Rd 4	Rd 5	Rd 6	Total
1	Holden	VH Commodore SS	23	13	20	25	25	25	131
1	Mazda	RX-7	20	20	25	23	23	20	131
3	Ford	Capri V6, XE Falcon, XD Falcon & Escort	14	23	13	11	9	14	84
4	BMW	635 CSi	15	5	23	-	11	13	67
5	Nissan	Bluebird Turbo	25	25	-	-	-	-	50
6	Audi	5+5	13	8	-	-	-	-	21
7	Chevrolet	Camaro Z28	11	-	-	-	-	-	11
7	Alfa Romeo	GTV6	-	-	6	5	-	-	11
