= 1983 Castrol 400 =

The 1983 Castrol 400 was an endurance race for Group C Touring Cars held at the Sandown Park circuit in Victoria, Australia on 11 September 1983. The race was staged over 129 laps of the 3.1 km circuit, totalling 399.9 km. It was Round 3 of the 1983 Australian Endurance Championship and Round 3 of the 1983 Australian Endurance Championship of Makes.

The race, which was the 18th annual Sandown long-distance race, was won by Allan Moffat driving a Mazda RX-7. The ease in which Moffat won his fifth Sandown endurance race put him as the hot favourite for the upcoming James Hardie 1000 at Bathurst. Moffat had stalked early race leaders Peter Brock and Allan Grice before they both fell by the wayside leaving the Mazda to take its second straight win in the Sandown enduro. Second place went to the JPS Team BMW 635 CSi of Jim Richards. The performance of the BMW suddenly saw the car as a darkhorse for Bathurst. Finishing third in their Holden Commodore were Warren Cullen and Ron Harrop.

Pre-race favourite and pole winner Peter Brock suffered a rare failure when he lost the brakes on his Marlboro Holden Dealer Team Commodore early on and actually hit the fence, forcing him out of the race. Brock later took over the second MHDT Commodore from John Harvey and eventually finished third on the road, however he was later disqualified as he had not cross-entered to drive the #25 car.

After a poor 1983 Australian Touring Car Championship in which he lost his crown to Moffat, Dick Johnson served notice that the Ford XE Falcon would be a force at Bathurst after development work had cured the big Ford's suspension problems. Johnson put the now green coloured car on the front row matching Brock's pole time, although after winning the start his race ended with gearbox failure only a few hundred metres later.

== Classes ==
Cars competed in two classes:

- Over 3000 cc
- Under 3000 cc

== Results ==
=== Top 10 Qualifiers ===
| Pos | No. | Entrant | Driver | Car | Time |
|---|---|---|---|---|---|
| Pole | 05 | Marlboro Holden Dealer Team | (Australia) Peter Brock | Holden VH Commodore SS | 1:10.7 |
| 2 | 17 | Palmer Tube Mills | (Australia) Dick Johnson | Ford XE Falcon | 1:10.7 |
| 3 | 6 | STP Roadways Racing | (Australia) Allan Grice | Holden VH Commodore SS | 1:10.7 |
| 4 | 3 | Cadbury Schweppes Pty Ltd | (Australia) David Parsons | Holden VH Commodore SS | 1:11.3 |
| 5 | 15 | Nissan Motor Co. | (Australia) George Fury | Nissan Bluebird Turbo | 1:11.4 |
| 6 | 43 | Peter Stuyvesant International | (Canada) Allan Moffat | Mazda RX-7 | 1:11.5 |
| 7 | 31 | JPS/Team BMW | (New Zealand) Jim Richards | BMW 635 CSi | 1:11.7 |
| 8 | 2 | Masterton Homes | (Australia) Steve Masterton | Ford XE Falcon | 1:12.3 |
| 9 | 50 | Petrolon Slick 50 | (Australia) Peter McLeod | Mazda RX-7 | 1:12.5 |
| 10 | 11 | Soundwave Discos | (Australia) Garry Rogers | Holden VH Commodore SS | 1:12.6 |

=== Race ===
| Position | Drivers | No. | Car | Entrant | Class | Laps |
|---|---|---|---|---|---|---|
| 1 | Allan Moffat | 43 | Mazda RX-7 | Peter Stuyvesant International | Over 3000cc | 129 |
| 2 | Jim Richards | 31 | BMW 635 CSi | JPS/Team BMW | Over 3000cc | 129 |
| 3 | Warren Cullen; Ron Harrop | 22 | Holden VH Commodore SS | W. Cullen | Over 3000cc | 127 |
| 4 | Murray Carter | 18 | Mazda RX-7 | Valentine Greetings | Over 3000cc | 127 |
| 5 | Terry Shiel | 37 | Mazda RX-7 | Eurocar's Northside P/L | Over 3000cc | 123 |
| 6 | Gregg Hansford; Garry Waldon | 42 | Mazda RX-7 | Peter Stuyvesant International | Over 3000cc | 122 |
| 7 | Johnnie Walker; Gene Cook | 32 | Mazda RX-7 | J. Walker | Over 3000cc | 120 |
| 8 | Scotty Taylor; Kevin Kennedy | 24 | Holden VH Commodore SS | Scotty Taylor Holden | Over 3000cc | 119 |
| 9 | Lawrie Nelson | 59 | Ford Capri V6 | Capri Components | Under 3000cc | 119 |
| 10 | Barry Jones; Peter Dane | 41 | Mazda RX-7 | BF Goodrich Australia | Over 3000cc | 119 |
| 11 | Jim Myhill | 34 | Mazda RX-7 | John Myhill Racing | Under 3000cc | 114 |
| 12 | Terry Ryan; Graham Storah | 34 | Mazda RX-7 | T. Ryan | Over 3000cc | 113 |
| 13 | Ray Cutchie; Mike Quinn | 34 | Ford Escort | Bob Holden Motors Manly Vale | Under 3000cc | 111 |
| 14 | John White | 61 | Isuzu Gemini ZZ | J. White | Under 3000cc | 108 |
| 15 | Brian Winsall; Louis Stoopman | 87 | Isuzu Gemini | 1.6 Litre Touring Car Association | Under 3000cc | 95 |
| 16 | Joe Beninca; Peter Beninca | 69 | Alfa Romeo GTV | Beninca Motors | Under 3000cc | 90 |
| NC | Andrew Harris; Gary Cooke | 9 | Ford XE Falcon | A. Harris | Over 3000cc | 95 |
| NC | Ken Harrison | 80 | Ford Escort | K.J. Harrison | Under 3000cc | 78 |
| NC | John Craft; Don Smith | 56 | Ford Capri V6 | Hulcraft Autos | Under 3000cc | 62 |
| DNF | Martin Power; Gerald Kay | 57 | Triumph Dolomite Sprint | Jagparts | Under 3000cc | |
| DNF | Rob Shute; Ian Burrell | 66 | Mitsubishi Colt Mirage | R. Shute | Under 3000cc | |
| DNF | Craig Bradtke; Bob Holden | 62 | Toyota Celica | Daily Planet | Under 3000cc | |
| DNF | Ron Dickson; Bob Stevens | 21 | Mazda RX-7 | R. Dickson | Over 3000cc | |
| DNF | Christine Gibson | 60 | Nissan Pulsar EXA | Nissan | Under 3000cc | |
| DNF | Andrew Manson; Geoff Manson | 48 | Holden VH Commodore SS | Roger Manson Holden | Over 3000cc | |
| DNF | Jim Faneco; Tony Hubbard | 40 | Ford XE Falcon | CDT Performance Vehicles | Over 3000cc | |
| DNF | Jim Keogh; Leo Leonard | 12 | Holden VH Commodore SS | Team Toshiba | Over 3000cc | |
| DNF | Rusty French; Alan Browne | 4 | Holden VH Commodore SS | John Sands Racing | Over 3000cc | |
| DNF | Garry Rogers; Clive Benson-Brown | 11 | Holden VH Commodore SS | Soundwave Discos | Over 3000cc | |
| DNF | Peter McLeod; Graeme Bailey | 50 | Mazda RX-7 | Petrolon Slick 50 | Over 3000cc | |
| DNF | Steve Masterton; Bruce Stewart | 2 | Ford XE Falcon | Masterton Homes | Over 3000cc | |
| DNF | David Parsons; Peter Janson | 3 | Holden VH Commodore SS | Cadbury Schweppes Pty. Ltd. | Over 3000cc | |
| DNF | Peter Brock | 05 | Holden VH Commodore SS | Marlboro Holden Dealer Team | Over 3000cc | |
| DNF | Fred Gibson | 16 | Nissan Bluebird Turbo | Nissan | Over 3000cc | |
| DNF | George Fury | 15 | Nissan Bluebird Turbo | Nissan | Over 3000cc | |
| DNF | Steve Harrington | 14 | Holden VH Commodore SS | STP Roadways Racing | Over 3000cc | |
| DNF | Allan Grice | 6 | Holden VH Commodore SS | STP Roadways Racing | Over 3000cc | |
| DNF | Mike Imrie; Graeme Treasure | 49 | Ford XD Falcon | CDT Performance Vehicles | Over 3000cc | 3 |
| DNF | Dick Johnson | 17 | Ford XE Falcon | Palmer Tube Mills | Over 3000cc | 1 |
| DSQ | John Harvey; Peter Brock | 25 | Holden VH Commodore SS | Marlboro Holden Dealer Team | Over 3000cc | 127 |

Note:

- Starters : 40
- Classified finishers: 16
- Running but not classified: 3
- Peter Brock took over the car of John Harvey after his own car suffered brake problems. The Brock/Harvey car placed third, but was subsequently disqualified due to the unauthorized driver change.

== Statistics ==
- Pole position - #05 Peter Brock - (Holden VH Commodore) - 1:10.7
- Race time - 3 hrs 20 mins 0.4 secs
- Fastest lap - #43 Allan Moffat - (Mazda RX-7) - 1:10.9 (new lap record)

== See also ==
- 1983 Castrol 400 - full race

| Preceded by 1982 Castrol 400 | Sandown 400; 1983 | Succeeded by 1984 Castrol 500 |
