= 1983 Australian Endurance Championship =

Seasons
- ← 1982 1984 →

The 1983 Australian Endurance Championship was a CAMS sanctioned motor racing title for drivers of Group C Touring Cars. The championship was contested over a six-round series with all rounds run concurrently with those of the 1983 Australian Endurance Championship of Makes.

Wollongong based Peter McLeod's consistent run over the series which saw him score points in all but the Castrol 400 at Sandown, won his first (and only) touring car championship driving his Slick 50 sponsored Mazda RX-7. Second was the JPS Team BMW 635 CSi of triple Bathurst 1000 winner Jim Richards, with Nissan Motorsport driver George Fury third in his Bluebird Turbo.

Fury, who won the opening two rounds of the series, and the Holden Dealer Team's star driver Peter Brock, who won the James Hardie 1000 at Bathurst and the final round in Adelaide, were the only multiple winners in the 1983 AEC, though Brock received no points from his Bathurst win due to having already started the race in his usual No.05 which blew its engine on lap 8. The other winners were 1983 ATCC winner Allan Moffat who drove his Mazda RX-7 to victory in the Castrol 400, Allan Grice who drove his Roadways Holden Commodore to victory at Surfers Paradise while John Harvey and Larry Perkins shared the Bathurst win with Peter Brock.

== Calendar ==
Rd.	Race title	Circuit	City/Town	Date	Winner/s	Car	Team	Car No.	Report
1	Silastic 300	Amaroo Park	Annangrove	7 August	(Australia) George Fury	Nissan Bluebird Turbo	Nissan	55	
2	Oran Park 250	Oran Park	Narellan	21 August	(Australia) George Fury	Nissan Bluebird Turbo	Nissan Motor Co.	57	
3	Castrol 400	Sandown	Melbourne	11 September	(Canada) Allan Moffat	Mazda RX-7	Peter Stuyvesant International Racing	43	Report
4	James Hardie 1000	Mount Panorama	Bathurst	2 October	(Australia) John Harvey (Australia) Peter Brock (Australia) Larry Perkins	Holden VH Commodore SS	Marlboro Holden Dealer Team	25	Report
5	Motorcraft 300	Surfers Paradise	Gold Coast	30 October	(Australia) Allan Grice	Holden VH Commodore SS	STP Roadways Racing	6	
6	Humes Guardrail 300	Adelaide International Raceway	Adelaide	20 November	(Australia) Peter Brock	Holden VH Commodore SS	Marlboro Holden Dealer Team	05	Report

== Class structure ==
Cars competed in two engine displacement classes:

- Up to 3000cc
- Over 3000cc

== Points structure ==
Championship points were awarded to the top twenty finishers at each round according to the outright position attained. If two drivers shared a car the points were split between the two drivers, except at Round 4 where two driver combinations were mandated by regulations, removing the single driver option. Full points to both drivers were awarded. The exception to this was Round 4 at Bathurst as Peter Brock received no points for winning the race while co-winners John Harvey and Larry Perkins were both awarded full points. This was because Brock had started the race in his usual No.05 which had an engine failure on lap 8 before transferring to No.25 on lap 22, the rules being that a driver could not be awarded awarded points after swapping cars. While this gave Brock no points despite the win, it did not affect his usual co-driver Perkins who only got to drive the race winning No.25 Commodore in the race.

Outright Position	1	2	3	4	5	6	7	8	9	10	11	12	13	14	15	16	17	18	19	20
Up to 3000cc	30	27	24	21	19	17	15	14	13	12	11	10	9	8	7	6	5	4	3	2
Over 3000cc	25	23	20	17	15	13	11	10	9	8	7	6	5	4	3	2	1	0	0	0

== Results ==
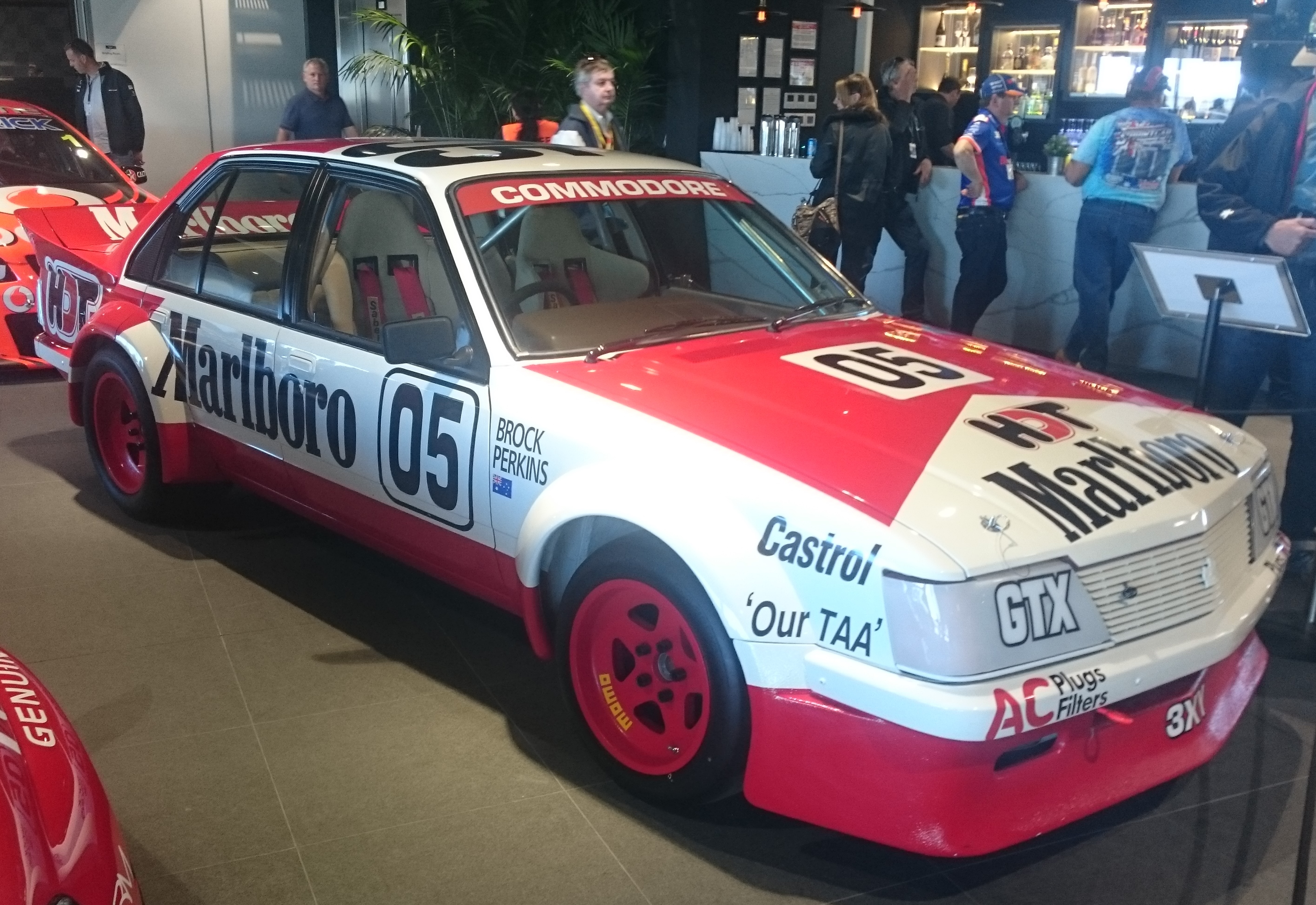
Peter Brock and Larry Perkins placed joint eighth in the championship having driven a Holden Commodore (VH) for the Marlboro Holden Dealer Team

Position	Driver	No.	Car	Entrant	Rd1	Rd2	Rd3	Rd4	Rd5	Rd6	Points
1	(Australia) Peter McLeod	50	Mazda RX-7	Petrolon Slick 50	10	10	-	15	20	17	72
2	(New Zealand) Jim Richards	31	BMW 635 CSi	JPS Team BMW	15	5	23	-	11	13	67
3	(Australia) George Fury	55 & 15	Nissan Bluebird Turbo	Nissan Motor Co. Australia	25	25	-	-	-	-	50
4	(Canada) Allan Moffat	43	Mazda RX-7	Peter Stuyversant International Racing	-	-	25	23	-	-	48
5	(Australia) Allan Grice	6	Holden VH Commodore SS	STP Roadways Racing	-	-	-	20	25	-	45
6	(Australia) Gregg Hansford	34	Mazda RX-7	Peter Stuyversant International Racing	-	15	6.5	-	23	-	44.5
7	(Australia) Terry Finnigan	10	Holden VH Commodore SS	Terry Finnigan	8.5	13	-	-	17	-	38.5
=8	(Australia) Larry Perkins	05 & 25	Holden VH Commodore SS	Marlboro Holden Dealer Team	11.5	-	-	25	-	-	36.5
=8	(Australia) Peter Brock	05	Holden VH Commodore SS	Marlboro Holden Dealer Team	11.5	-	-	-	-	25	36.5
