= Group A =

Motorsport category for race and rally cars

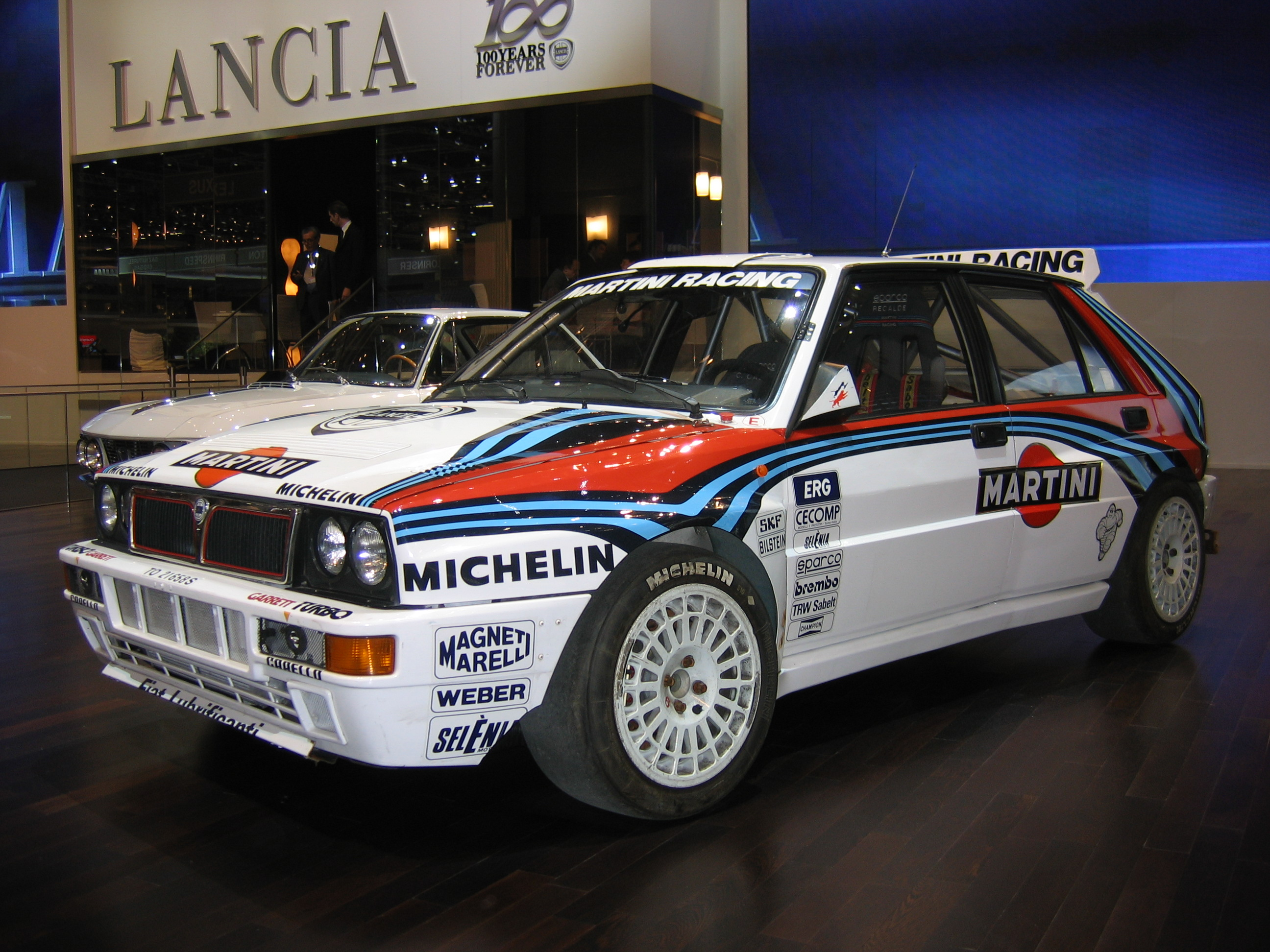
Lancia Delta HF integrale Group A

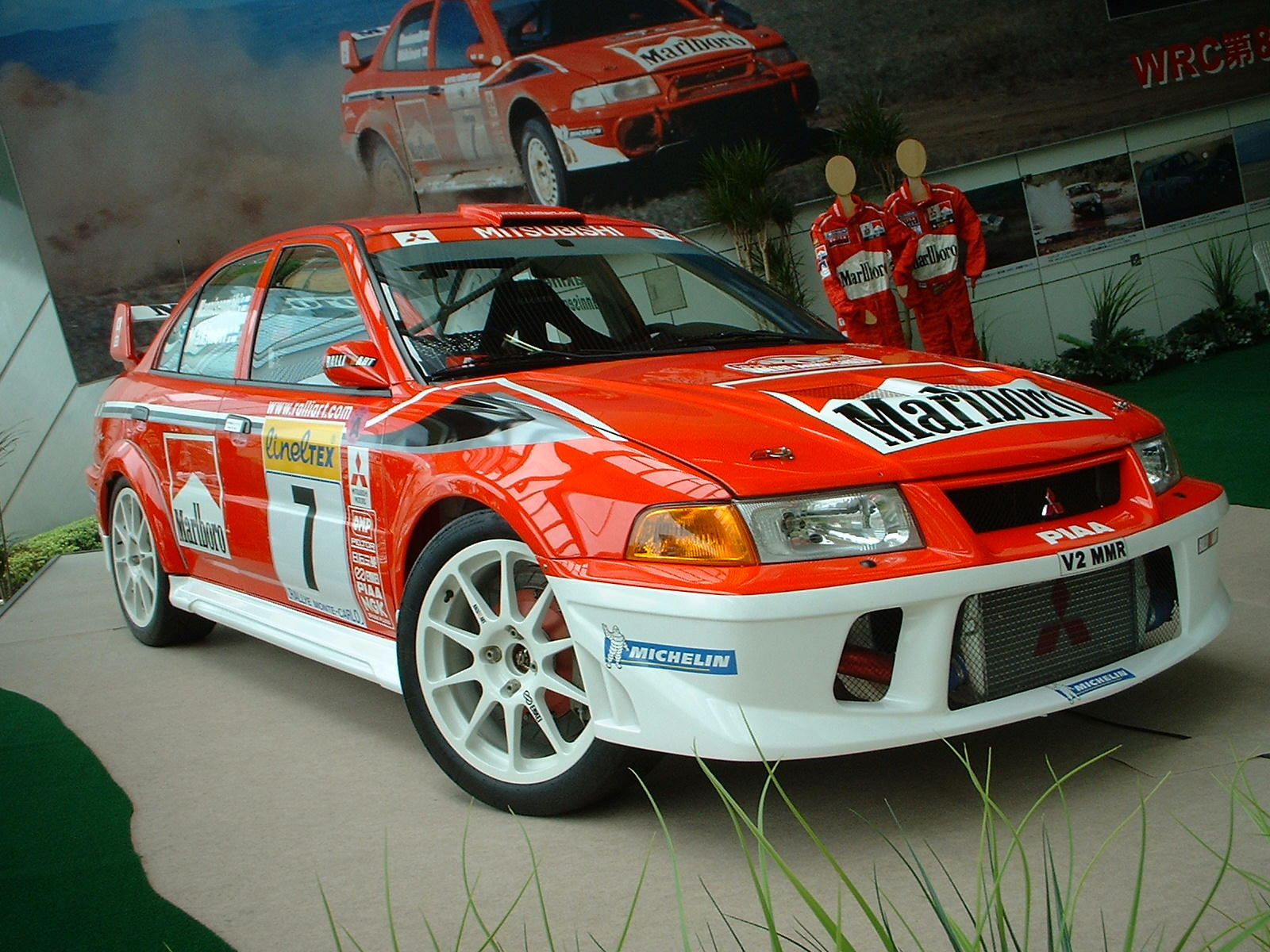
Mitsubishi Lancer Evolution VI, Tommi Mäkinen edition, a Group A rally car

Group A is a set of motorsport regulations administered by the FIA covering production derived touring cars for competition, usually in touring car racing and rallying. In contrast to the short-lived Group B and Group C, Group A vehicles were limited in terms of power, weight, allowed technology and overall cost. Group A was aimed at ensuring numerous entries in races of privately owned vehicles.

Group A was introduced by the FIA in 1982 to replace the outgoing Group 2 as "modified touring cars", while Group N would replace Group 1 as "standard touring cars". During the early years there were no further formula for production based race cars. Cars from multiple Groups could contest the World Rally Championship for Manufacturers for example until 1997 when the specific World Rally Car formula was introduced as the only option. In recent years Groups A and N have begun to be phased out in eligibility in championships though they continue to form the homologation basis for most production based race car formulae including the Groups Rally which must first be homologated in Group A. Both Groups N and A, and the details of their differences are described in the FIAs International Sporting Code and several of its Appendices J articles.

== Homologation ==
To qualify for FIA approval, 2,500 identical models have to be built in 12 consecutive months. The homologation period lasts for every subsequent year of production and seven years after the year that less than 10% (250) are produced in one year and the model is considered out of production by the FIA. Evolutions of the series production model homologated are permitted with a ET (Evolution of the type) extension applied. Before 1993 the initial production requirement was 5000.

However, not all manufacturers who built such models sold them all, some stripped the majority of them to rebuild them as stock models or used them to allow teams to use modified parts. One such example of this was Volvo with the 240 Turbo in 1985, an evolution of a model first homologated in 1982. After they had produced 500 such models, Volvo stripped 477 cars of their competition equipment and sold them as standard, street legal 240 Turbos. As a result, after FISA's failed attempts at finding an "Evolution" car in any European country, Volvo were forced to reveal the names of all 500 "Evo" owners to be permitted to compete.

Due to the smaller car markets of Australia and New Zealand, a deal was struck between FISA and the Confederation of Australian Motorsport (CAMS) so that Australian manufacturers only had to produce 1,000 base models of the various cars which they wished to homologate for racing, though the racing models still had to comply with the additional 500 production minimum for any evolution models. Ultimately Holden was the only Australian car manufacturer to homologate cars for racing in Group A with their various V8-powered Holden Commodores, the evolution models first coming from Peter Brock's HDT Special Vehicles, and later the Tom Walkinshaw owned Holden Special Vehicles (HSV) set up in 1987 to replace the HDT.

== Touring car racing ==
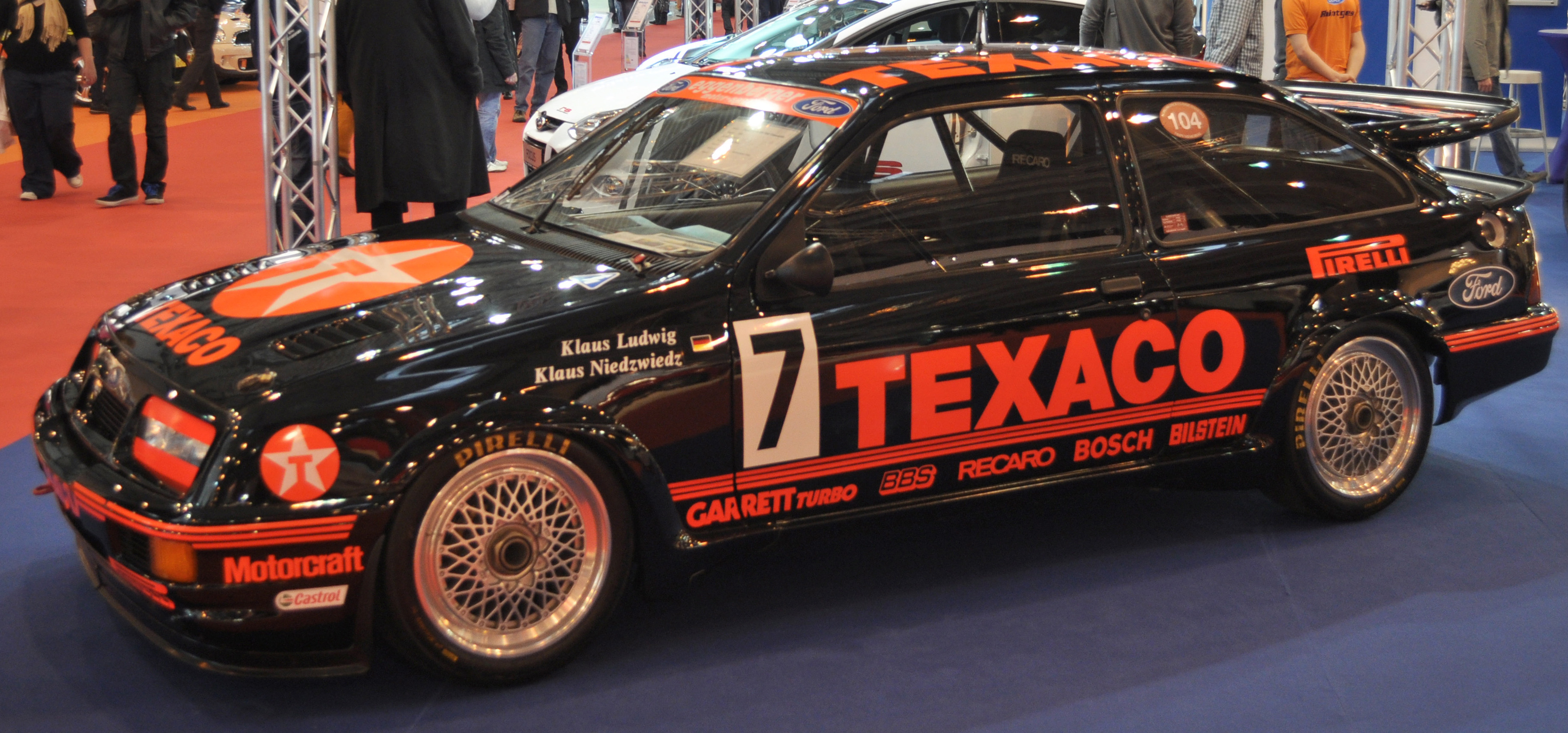
Ford Sierra RS500 Group A touring car

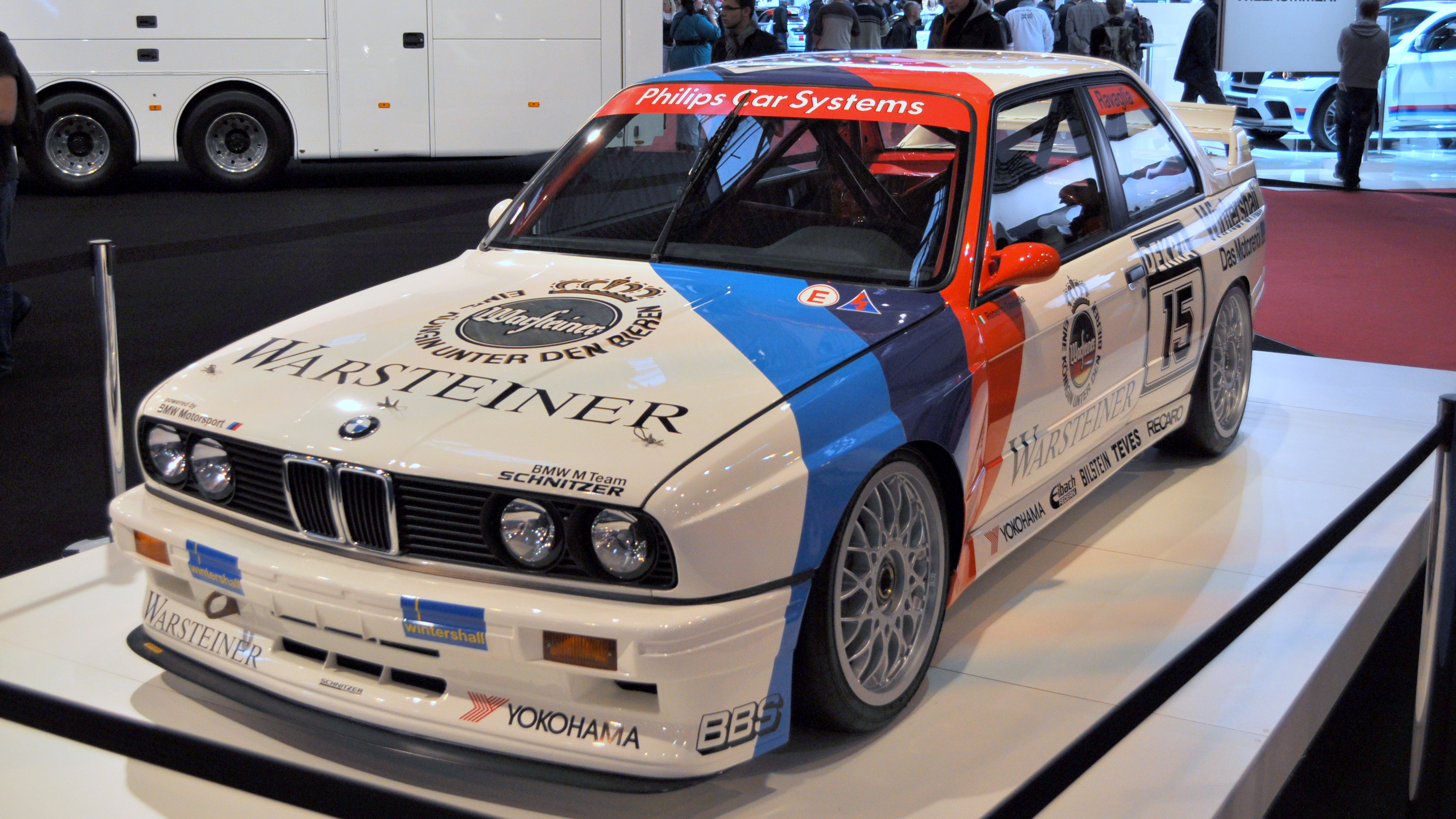
A BMW M3 (E30) Group A DTM touring car

For touring car competition, vehicles such as the BMW 635 CSi and M3, Jaguar XJS, various turbo Ford Sierra, the V8 Ford Mustang, the turbo Volvo 240T, Rover Vitesse, various V8 Holden Commodores, various turbo Nissan Skylines, including the 4WD, twin turbo GT-R, Mitsubishi Starion Turbo, Alfa Romeo 75 (turbo) and GTV6, various Toyota Corollas and the Toyota Supra Turbo A were homologated. In the European Touring Car Championship, Group A consisted of three divisions, Division 3 – for cars over 2500cc, Division 2 – for car engine sizes of 1600–2500cc, Division 1 for cars that are less than 1600cc. These cars competed in standard bodykits, with the production-derived nature required manufactures to release faster vehicles for the roads in order to be competitive on the track. Tyre width was dependent on the car's engine size.

The FIA continued to promulgate regulations for Group A touring cars until at least 1993, however Group A survived in touring car racing in domestic championships until 1993. The German Deutsche Tourenwagen Meisterschaft (DTM) switched to a 2.5L Class 1 formula in 1993, while in Japan in 1994 the Japanese Touring Car Championship organisers followed suit and switched classes like most other countries who had adopted the British Touring Car Championship-derived Supertouring regulations. Many of the redundant Skylines found a new home in the form of the JGTC (Japanese GT Championship) with modified aerodynamic devices, showing its competitiveness whilst being up against Group C, former race modified roadcars and specially developed racers, like the Toyota Supras during the earlier years.

The Confederation of Australian Motor Sport had originally announced in mid-1983 that Australia would adopt Group A from 1 January 1985 to replace the locally developed Group C (not to be confused with FIA Group C racing cars) rules that had been in place since 1973. A class for the new Group A cars was included in selected Australian Touring Car endurance races in late 1984, prior to the replacement of Group C for 1985. The category would be officially termed Group 3A Touring Cars from 1988. From 1993, CAMS replaced the existing Group A-based category with a new formula which would also be designated Group 3A Touring Cars. This was initially open to five litre V8 powered cars and two litre cars (later to become known as V8 Supercars and Super Touring Cars respectively).

Hillclimb competitions still use Group A as a touring car class across Europe, while in Australia Group A is now a historic class, though only actual cars raced from 1985 to 1992 (complete with log books) are allowed to compete.

== Rallying ==
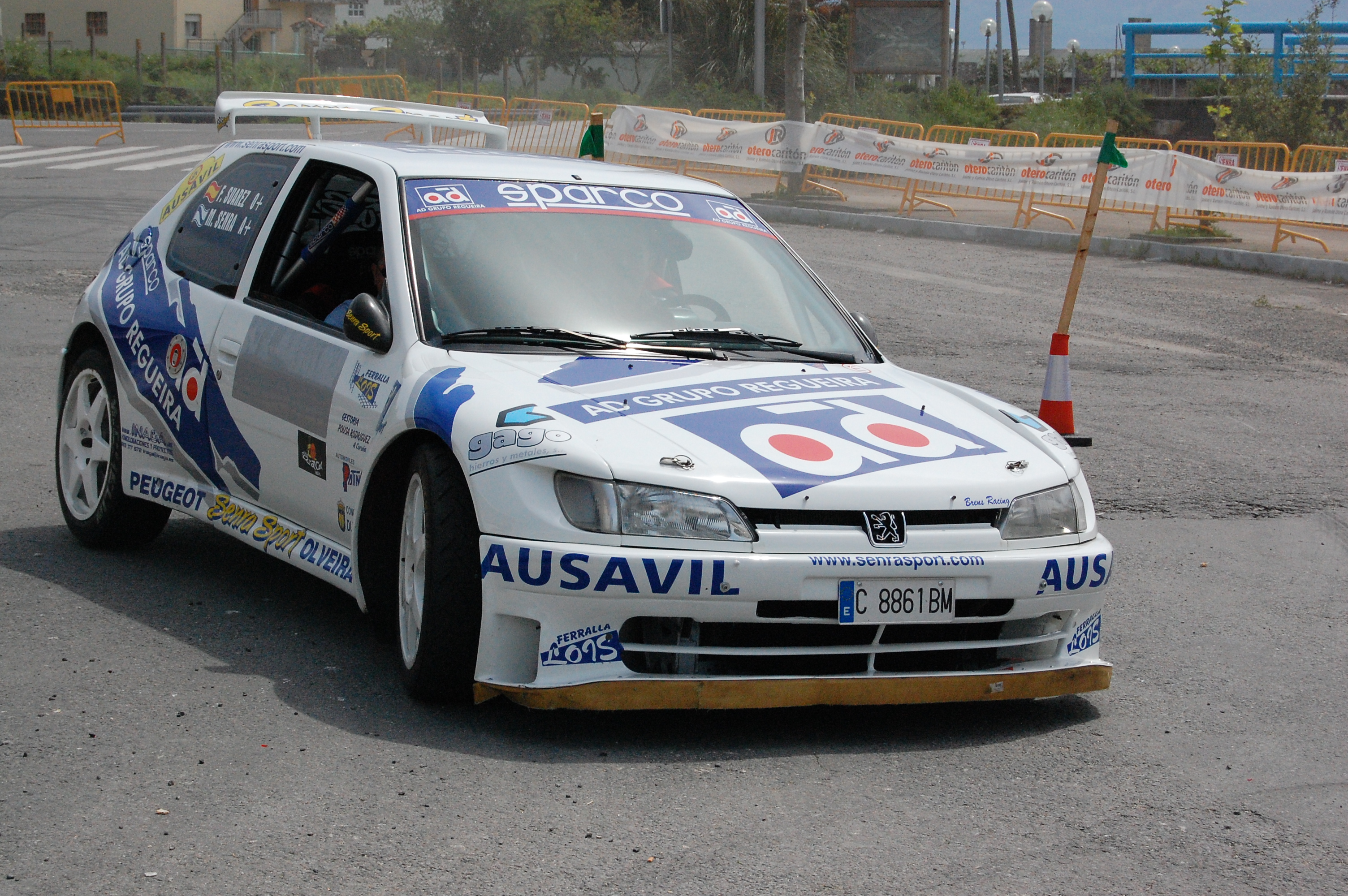
Peugeot 306 Maxi

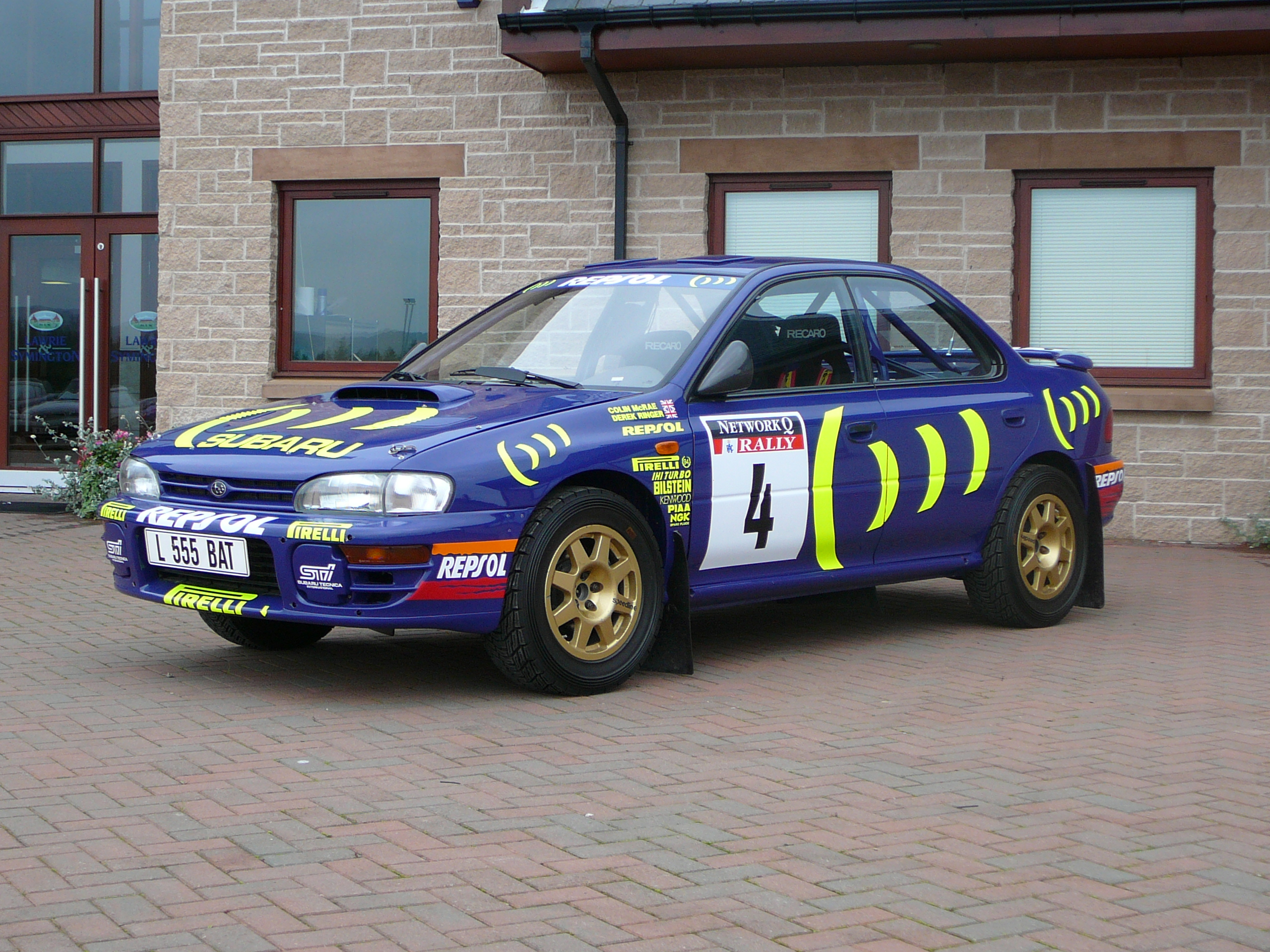
Colin McRae's 1995 WRC-winning Subaru Impreza Group A rally car

Under Group A in the World Rally Championship, the cars used were modified road cars, often based on turbocharged, four wheel drive versions of small cars such as the Lancia Delta Integrale, Ford Escort RS Cosworth, Toyota Celica GT-Four, Nissan Pulsar GTI-R, Subaru Impreza WRX, Mazda 323 GT-R and the Mitsubishi Lancer Evolution.

The cars are modified for greater power and torque, and fitted with suspension and tyres specifically suited to the conditions of the specific rally, which may take place entirely on asphalt roads, different consistencies of gravel and dirt roads and even snow/ice-covered roads on some rallies held in northern Europe.

By 1990, Group A cars exceeded the performance of the defunct Group B cars on many events, because although they had far less power they had better handling and traction. They were also much safer.

Group A is still used as the basis for most rally competitions around the world, but the most competitive cars are limited-production prototypes, known as kit cars (which competed in the FIA 2-Litre World Rally Cup), World Rally Cars, Super 1600 and Super 2000.

The last car to use the old Group A homologation requirement in the WRC Manufacturers' championship was the Mitsubishi Lancer Evolution VI. Group A cars could continue to enter WRC rallies until 2018 and can still enter the FIA's regional rally championships today.

== Series that used the Group A formula ==
- European Touring Car Championship 1982–1988
- British Touring Car Championship 1983–1990
- Deutsche Tourenwagen Meisterschaft 1984–1992
- New Zealand Touring Car Championship 1984–1992
- Nissan-Mobil 500 Series 1985–1993
- AMSCAR Series 1985–1992
- Australian Manufacturers' Championship 1985–1991
- Australian Touring Car Championship 1985–1992
- All Japan Touring Car Championship 1985–1993
- Australian Endurance Championship 1985–1986, 1990–1991
- Australian 2.0 Litre Touring Car Championship 1986–1987
- South Pacific Touring Car Championship 1986
- World Rally Championship 1987–1996
- World Touring Car Championship 1987
- Asia-Pacific Touring Car Championship 1988
- Campeonato de España de Turismos 1991-1993
