= Ford Falcon (XE) =

Australian full-size car, 1982-1984

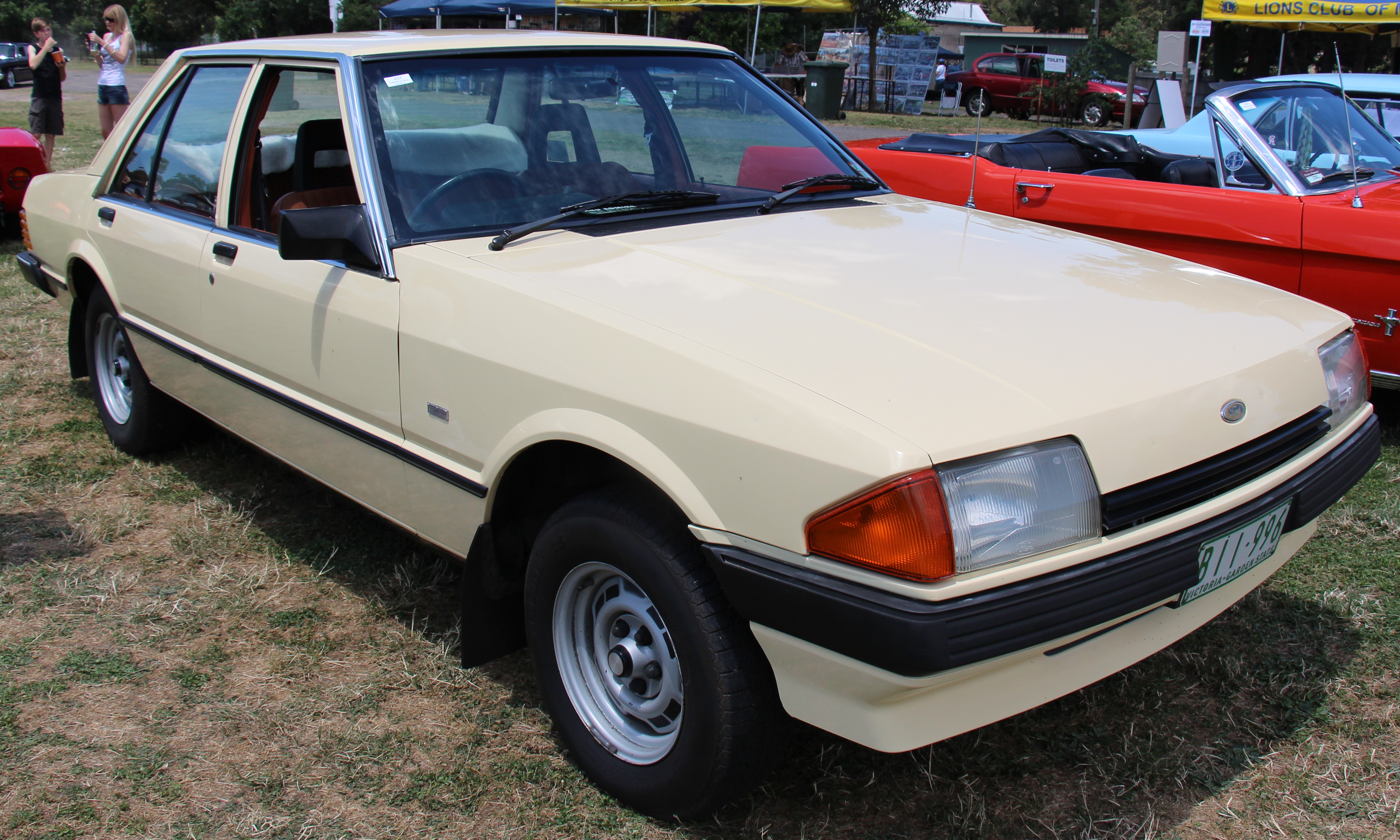
- Ford Falcon GL sedan

Overview
- Manufacturer: Ford Australia
- Also called: Ford Fairmont (XE)
- Production: March 1982 – October 1984

Body and chassis
- Class: Full-size car
- Body style: 4-door Sedan; 5-door Station Wagon; 2-door Coupe utility 3-door Van

Powertrain
- Engine: 3.3-litre I6; 4.1-litre carburetted I6; 4.1-litre EFI I6; 4.9-litre Cleveland V8; 5.8-litre Cleveland V8
- Transmission: 3-speed automatic (column, floor); 3-speed Borg Warner 0501 manual (column); 4-speed Borg Warner 0503 manual (floor); 4-speed Borg Warner 0506 manual (floor); 5-speed Borg Warner 0507 manual (floor)

Chronology
- Predecessor: Ford Falcon (XD)
- Successor: Ford Falcon (XF)

The Ford Falcon (XE) is a full-size car that was produced by Ford Australia from 1982 until 1984. It was the second iteration of the fourth generation of the Falcon and also included the Ford Fairmont (XE)—the luxury-oriented version.

== History ==
Introduced on 11 March 1982, the XE was a revised version of the XD Falcon, which it replaced. Its external differences were restricted to a new nose, new rear bumper, and taillights, along with new full wheel covers for the Fairmont, and 15 in (380 mm) alloy wheels for the Fairmont Ghia. Significant mechanical changes included revised six-cylinder engines with two-stage carburetors or optional electronic fuel injection, an optional five-speed manual transmission with overdrive, and the introduction of a new rear suspension system incorporating progressive rate coil springs, four trailing arms and Watt's linkage on all sedans. Wagons, utes and vans retained the rear semi-elliptical leaf springs as used on XD models. During the run of the XE Falcon, the option of V8 power was phased out, not returning until the EB Falcon of 1991.

== Powertrains ==
The XE-series was introduced with a choice of four engines.

- 3.3 L (200 cu in) inline six-cylinder
- 4.1 L (250 cu in) inline six-cylinder
- 4.9 L (302 cu in) V8
- 5.8 L (351 cu in) V8

=== Alloy Head II engines ===
The six-cylinder engines, which had benefited from the fitting of alloy cylinder heads midway through the XD model run, were further updated for the XE. Now dubbed Alloy Head II, the revised engines were fitted with a twin-venturi Weber 34 ADM carburetor, which gave improved performance, and a viscous clutch fan, which reduced power losses.

Compared to the previous XD Falcon, quoted DIN output had increased from 84 kW (113 hp) to 90 kW (121 hp) for the base model 3.3 litre engine, and from 94 kW (126 hp) to 105 kW (141 hp) for the high-compression variant of the 4.1 litre engine.

Fuel economy also improved, and for models equipped with the 3.3 litre engine, Ford offered the option of a new 5-speed manual transmission. Whereas Ford had claimed AS 2077 fuel consumption of 8.5 L/100 km (33 mpg_{‑imp}) highway cycle and 13 L/100 km (22 mpg_{‑imp}) urban cycle for XD sedans equipped with a 3.3 litre Alloy Head engine and 4-speed manual transmission, it now claimed 7.5 L/100 km (38 mpg_{‑imp}) highway cycle and 12.5 L/100 km (22.6 mpg_{‑imp}) urban cycle for the 5-speed manual-equipped XE sedan. For the more popular combination of 4.1 litre engine and 3-speed automatic transmission, economy improved from 10 to 9 L/100 km (28 to 31 mpg_{‑imp}) highway cycle, and from 14 to 13 L/100 km (20 to 22 mpg_{‑imp}) urban cycle.

The 3.3 litre engine accounted for more than 18 per cent of XE Falcon car production and 37 per cent of the commercial vehicle variants with the 4.1 litre engine accounting for the vast majority of the balance.

=== End of local V8 production ===
Sales of V8-powered Falcon models had declined significantly during the previous decade. While 30 per cent of XA Fords had been fitted with a V8, just 5 per cent of the 66,849 Falcons produced during 1982 had V8 power.

In the face of dwindling sales, Ford decided to end its local manufacturing of the 'Cleveland' V8 and market the Falcon range exclusively as six-cylinder cars. On 25 November 1982, a silver 4.9 L (302 cu in) Ford Fairmont Ghia ESP sedan, VIN # JG32AR33633K, was fitted with a commemorative plaque on its dashboard that recorded the end of a fifty year era of V8-powered Ford passenger cars.

In hindsight, Ford ended V8 production just as petrol prices, which had spiked following the 1979 oil crisis, were starting to ease. Motoring journalists have suggested that Ford effectively handed the local performance market to rival Holden, which continued to offer V8-engined cars.

=== Introduction of EFI option ===
An EFI version of the 4.1 litre engine was introduced in February 1983, incorporating Bosch Jetronic LE fuel injection. Intended to replace the now-defunct 4.9 L (302 cu in) V8, the 4.1 EFI engine initially produced only 111 kW (149 hp) and 325 N⋅m (240 ft⋅lb), a significant reduction from the 140 kW (188 hp) and 344 N⋅m (254 ft⋅lb) produced by the V8. However, Ford claimed that the alloy-head six-cylinder EFI Falcon was 136 kg (300 lb) lighter than its iron-head Cleveland V8 predecessor, allowing it to accelerate from 0 to 100 km/h (62 mph) in 10.1 seconds, 0.6 seconds faster than the 4.9 L V8 model.

Ford marketed the new EFI engine based on its strong torque characteristics, declaring that it, "offered virtually the same performance as the 4.9 litre V8 but with substantial savings in fuel consumption". Promotional literature demonstrated how the long-wheelbase Fairlane variant equipped with the EFI engine was only 0.1 seconds slower than the previous 4.9 L model in accelerating to 60 km/h (37 mph) when carrying five passengers and towing a 1,590 kg (3,505 lb) trailer. Ford quoted AS 2077 figures for the Fairlane EFI of 14.5 L/100 km (19.5 mpg_{‑imp}) city cycle versus 19 L/100 km (15 mpg_{‑imp}) for the 4.9 L model.

=== Transmissions ===
Manual transmission was available in 3-speed column shift and in the more common 4-speed floor shift, as well as the new 5-speed floor shift. The automatic transmission was a floor-shifted 3-speed in 5-seater configurations or with a column-shift in 6-seater models. Automatic was more common than manual, even though it was at extra cost in the GL and lesser range of vehicles.

== Model range ==
The XE range consisted of nine models marketed as follows:

- Falcon utility
- Falcon van
- Falcon GL ute
- Falcon GL van
- Falcon GL sedan
- Falcon GL wagon
- Fairmont sedan
- Fairmont wagon
- Fairmont Ghia sedan

For the XE series, Ford differentiated the appearance of the Fairmont Ghia sedan from the base Fairmont model by equipping it with unique front styling, featuring wider headlamps with integrated driving lamps.

A new version of Ford's S-Pack option was available for Falcon GL sedan, wagon, ute and van (all then badged as Falcon S) whilst a new version of the European Sports Pack (ESP) option also remained on offer for the Fairmont Ghia sedan.

Limited edition models followed, including the GL-based Falcon X-Pack sedan and wagon in late 1982, the Fairmont Ghia Limited Edition sedan in late 1983 and the GL-based Falcon Eclipse sedan and wagon in early 1984.

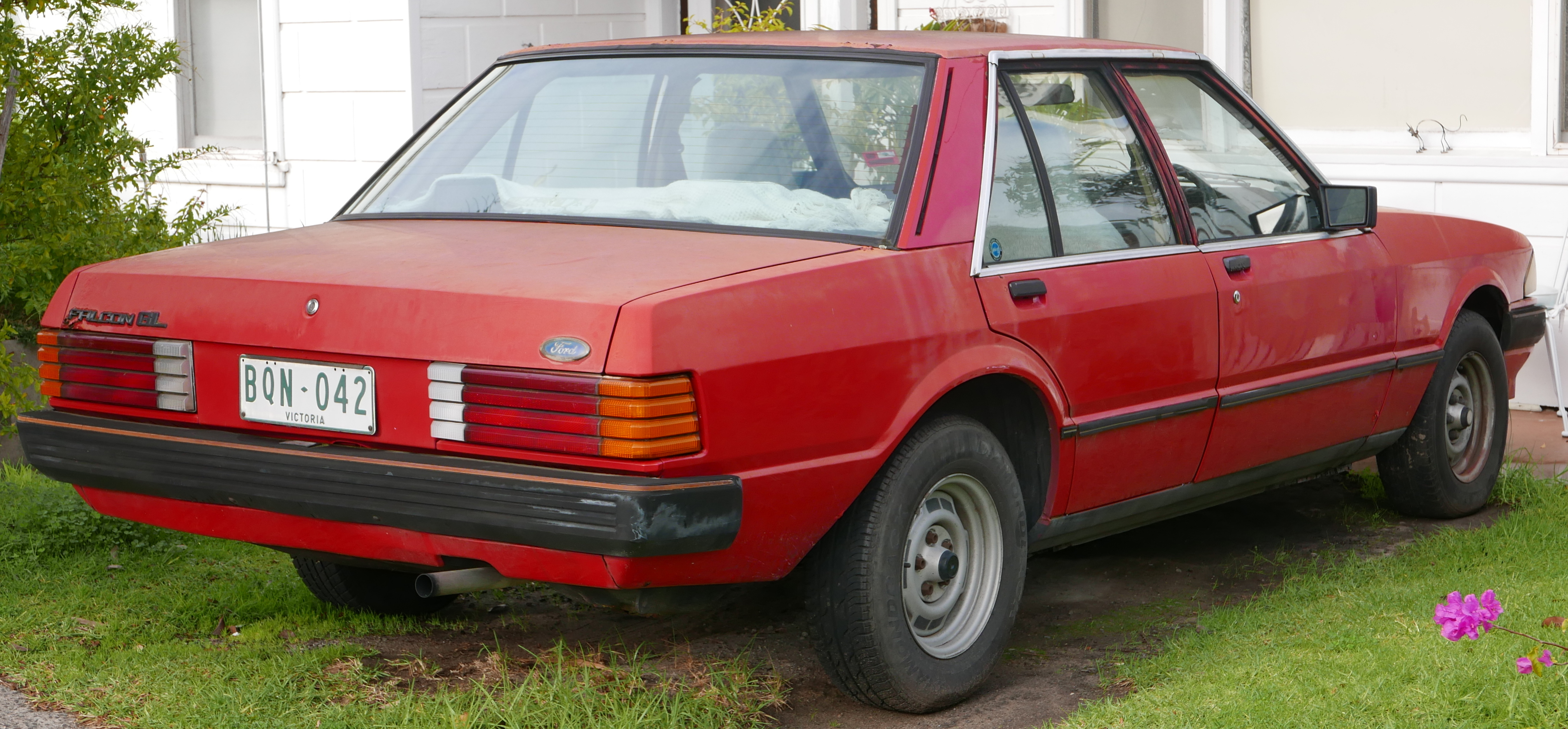
Falcon GL sedan

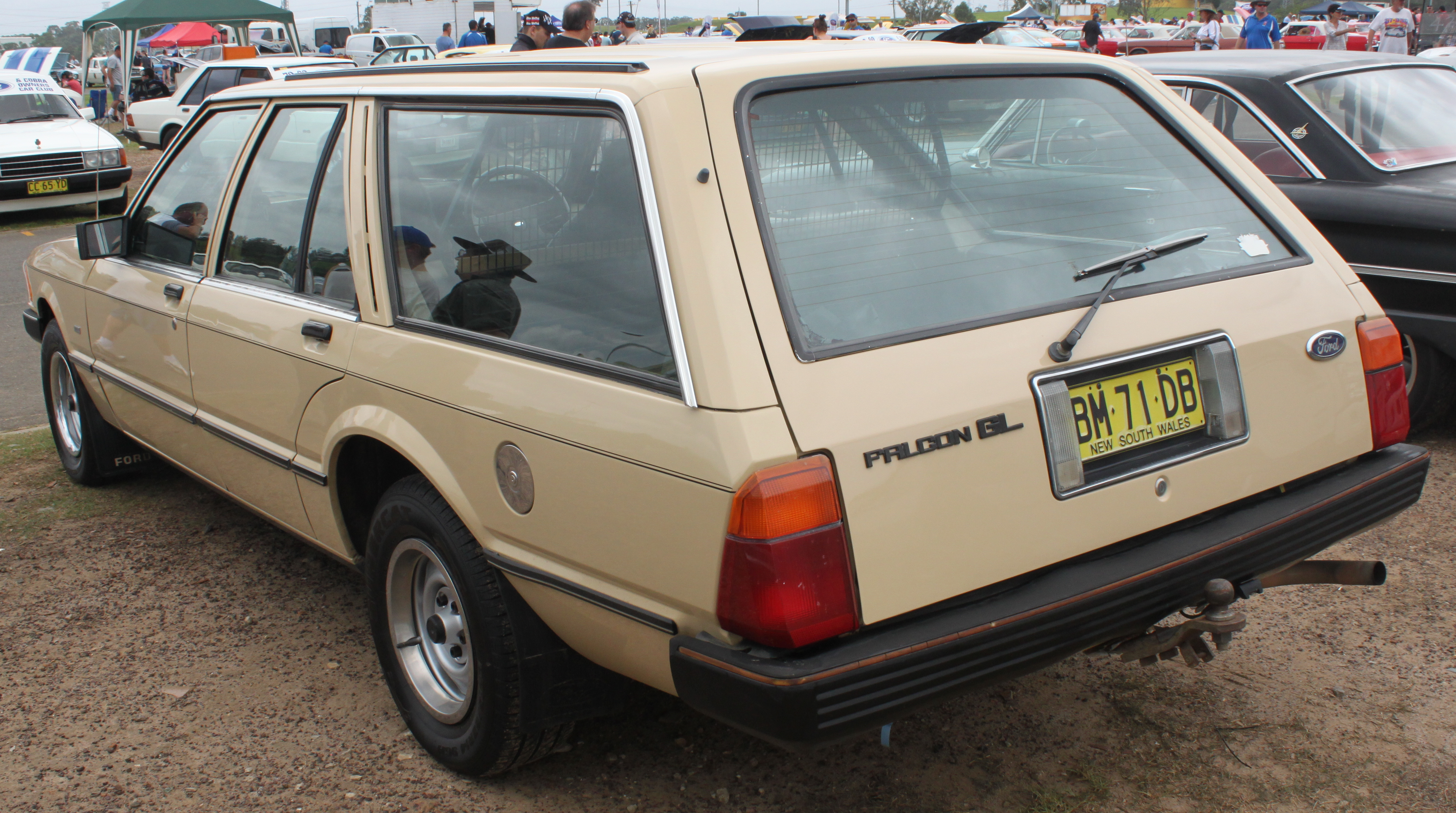
Falcon GL wagon

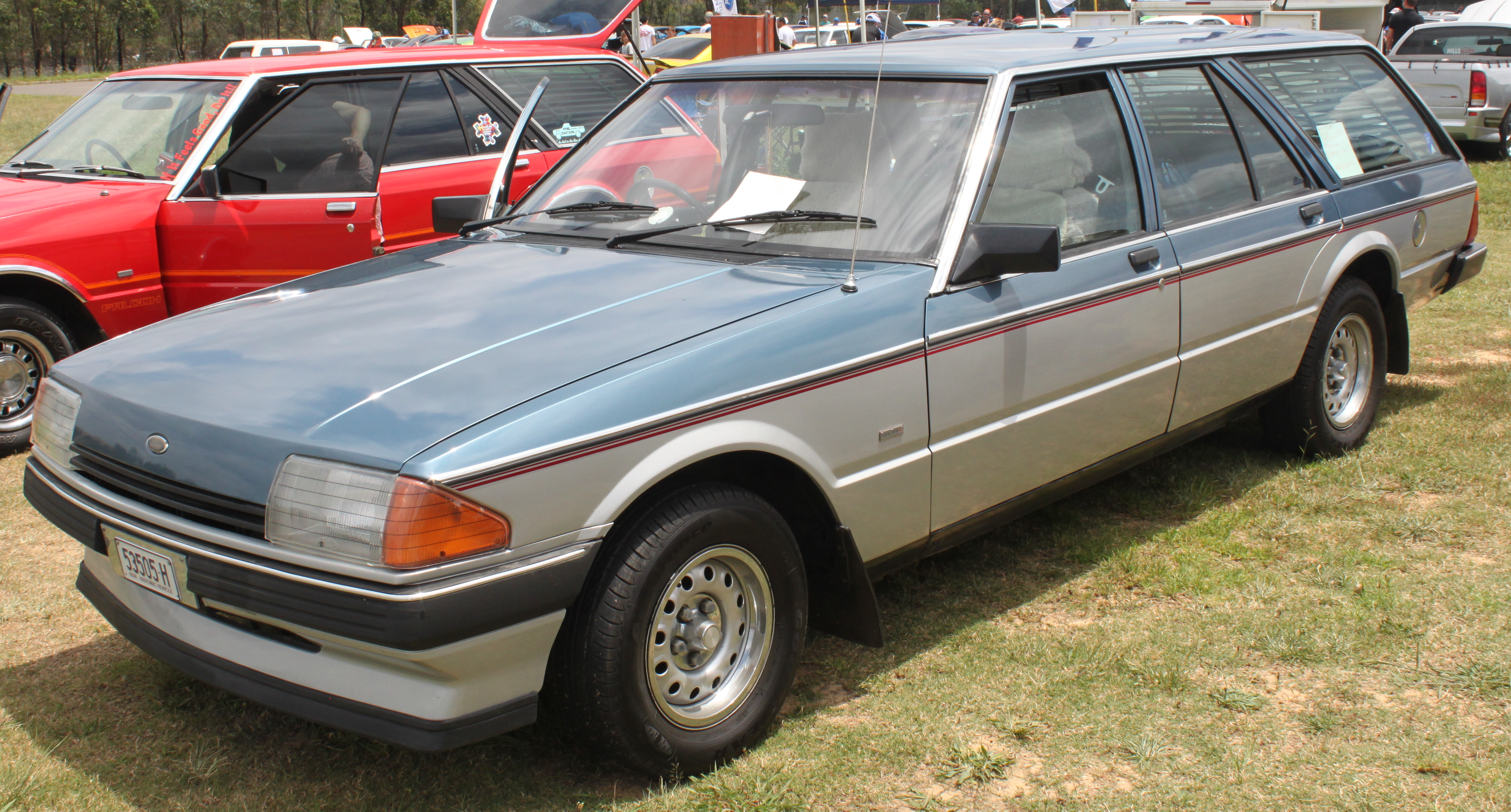
Falcon GL Eclipse wagon

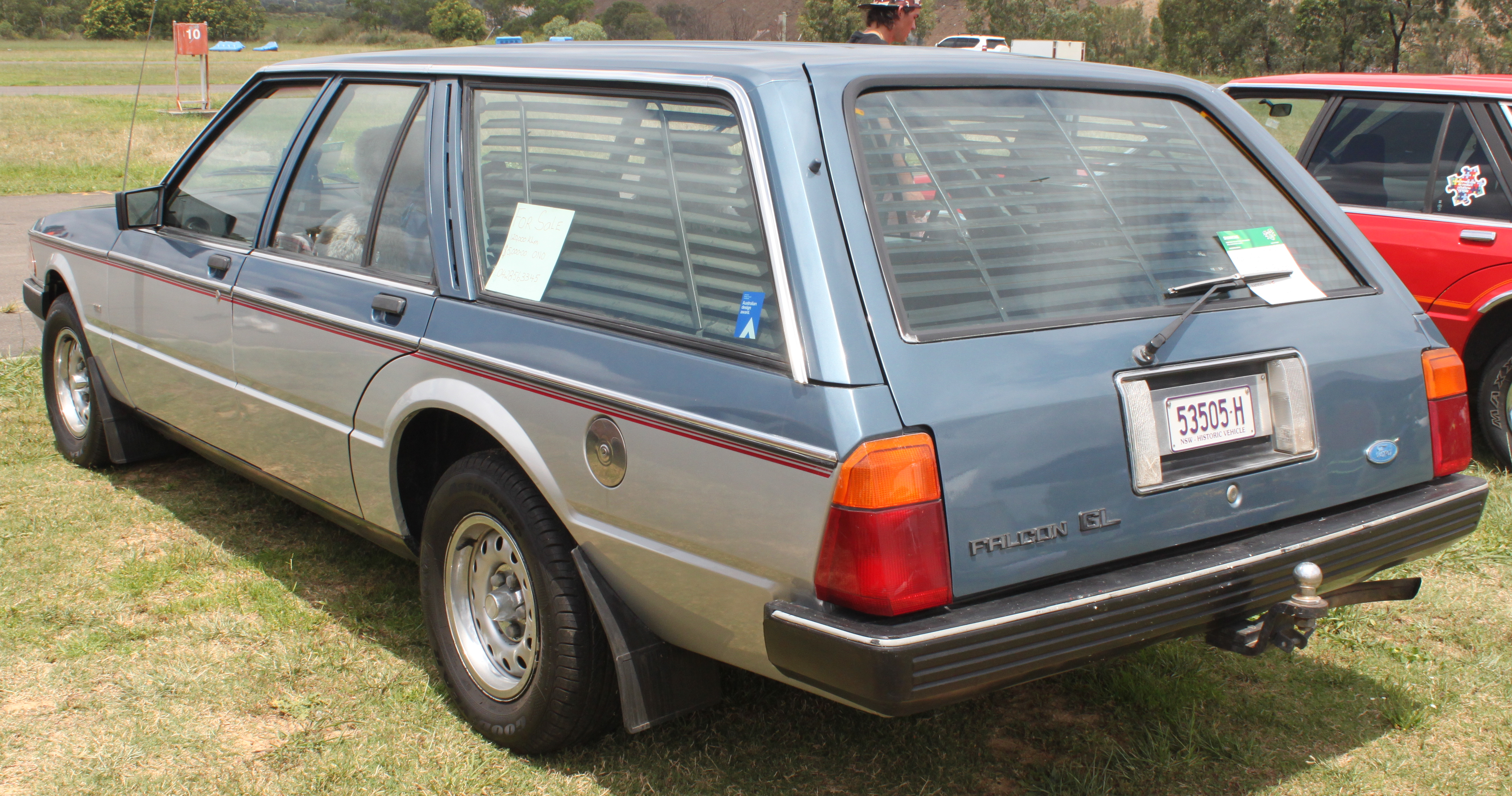
Falcon GL Eclipse wagon

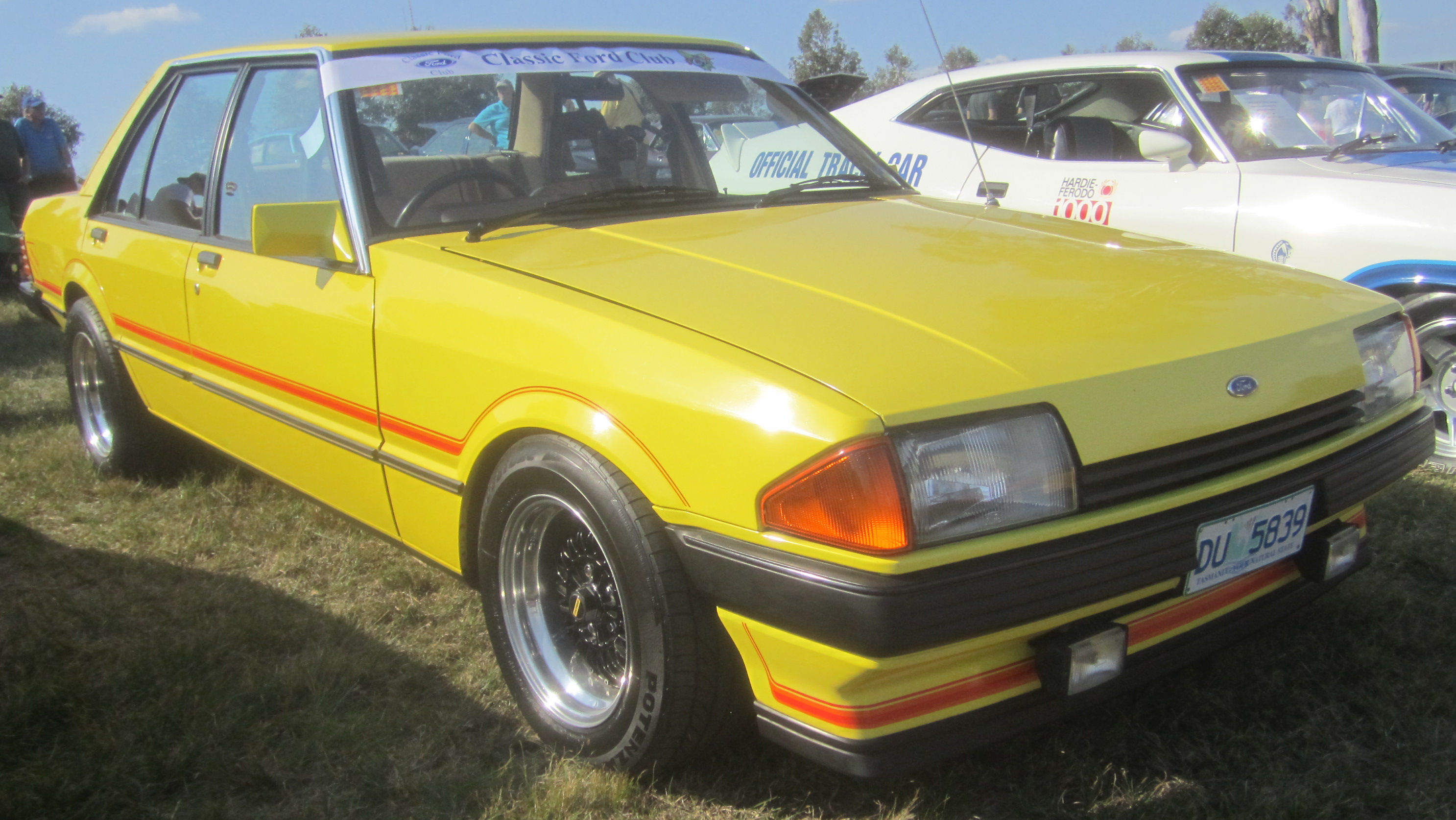
Falcon S sedan

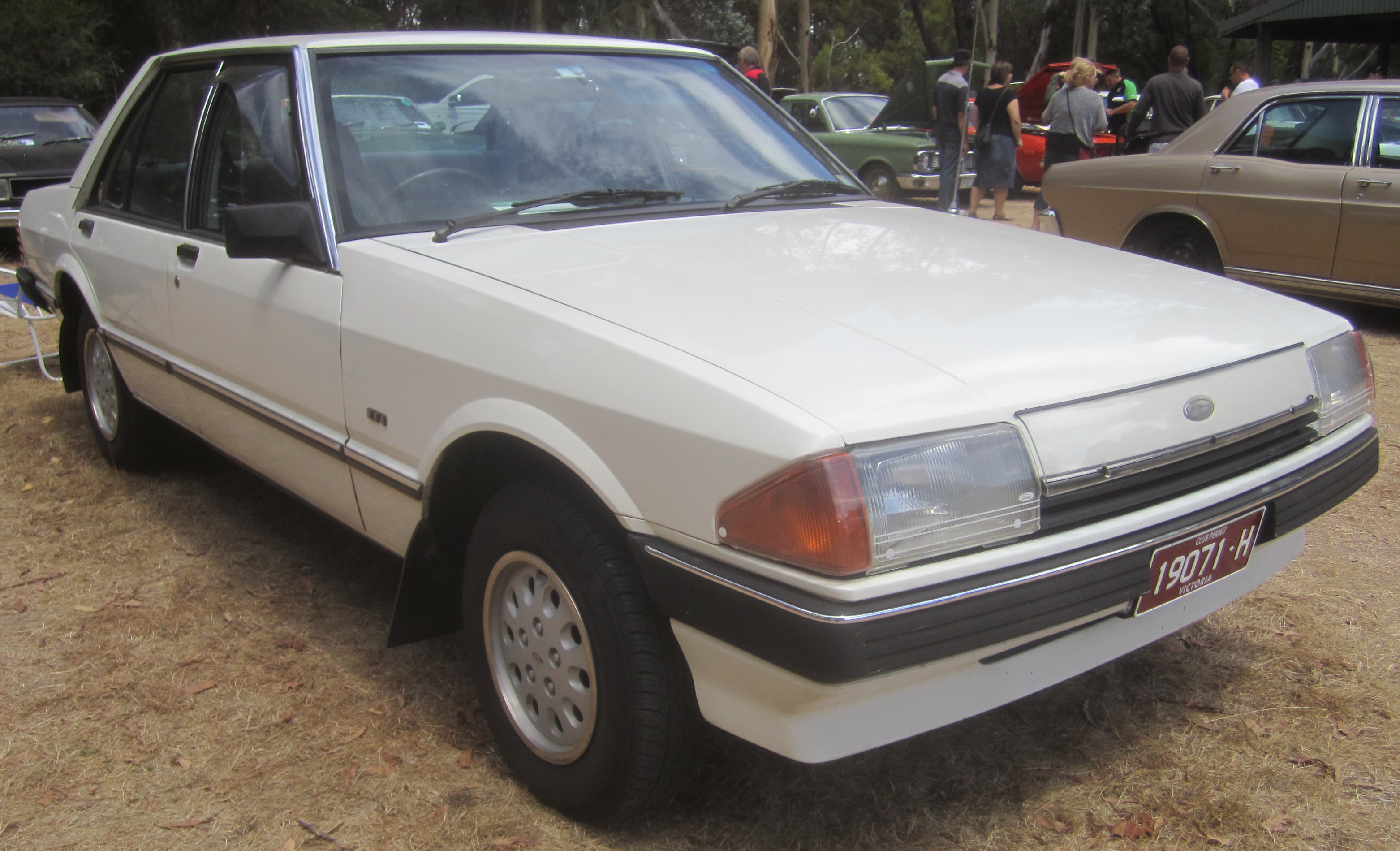
Fairmont sedan

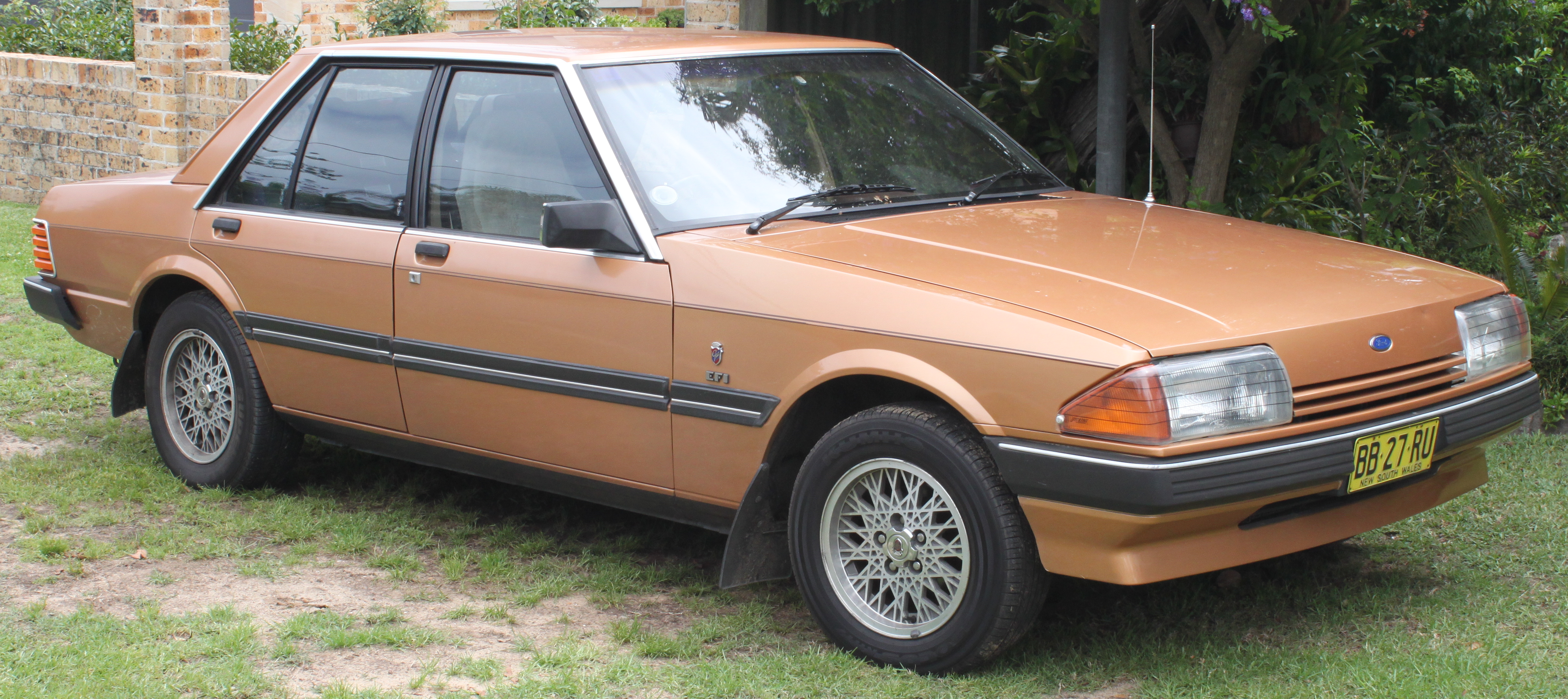
Fairmont Ghia sedan

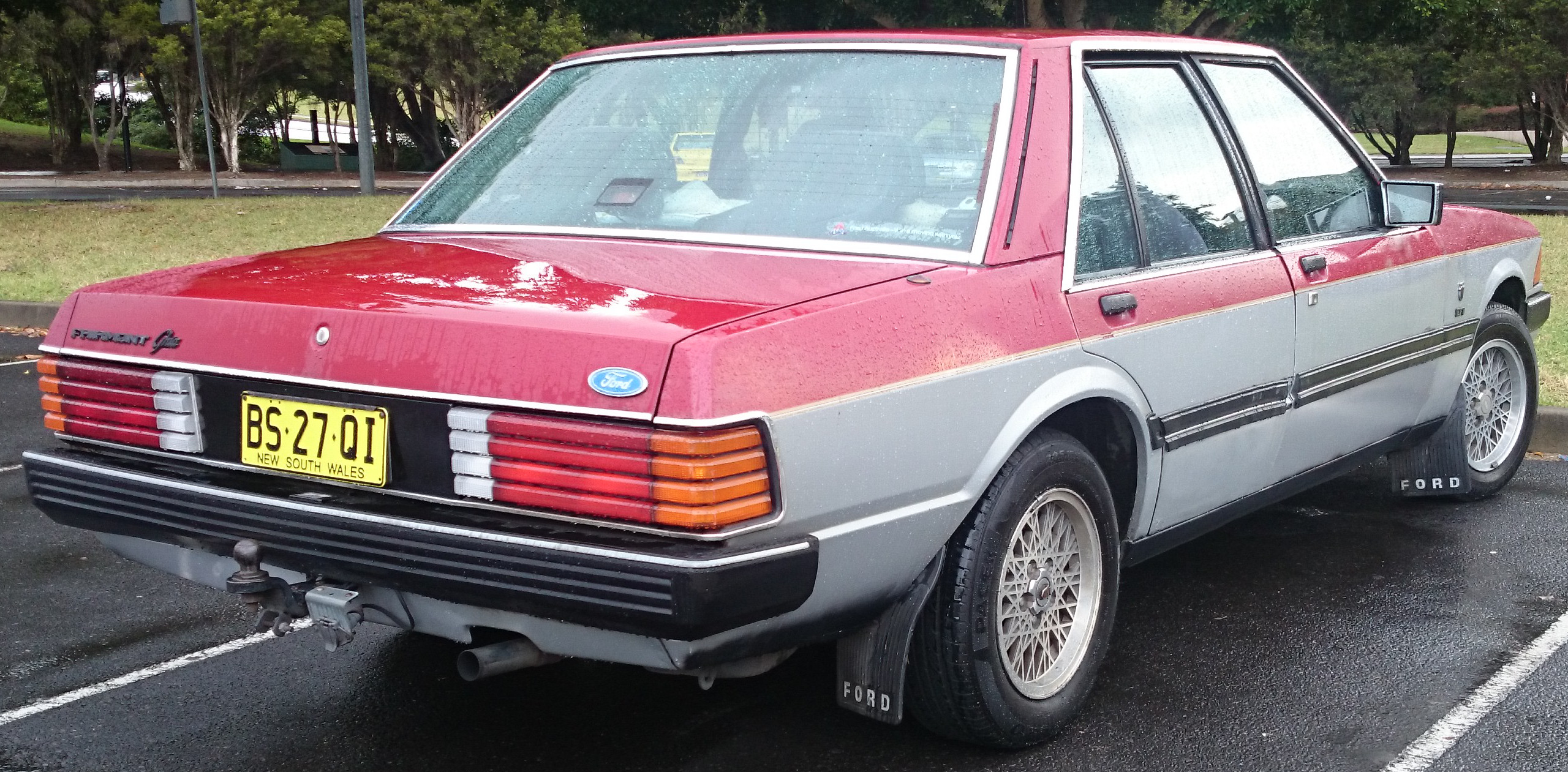
Fairmont Ghia Limited Edition sedan

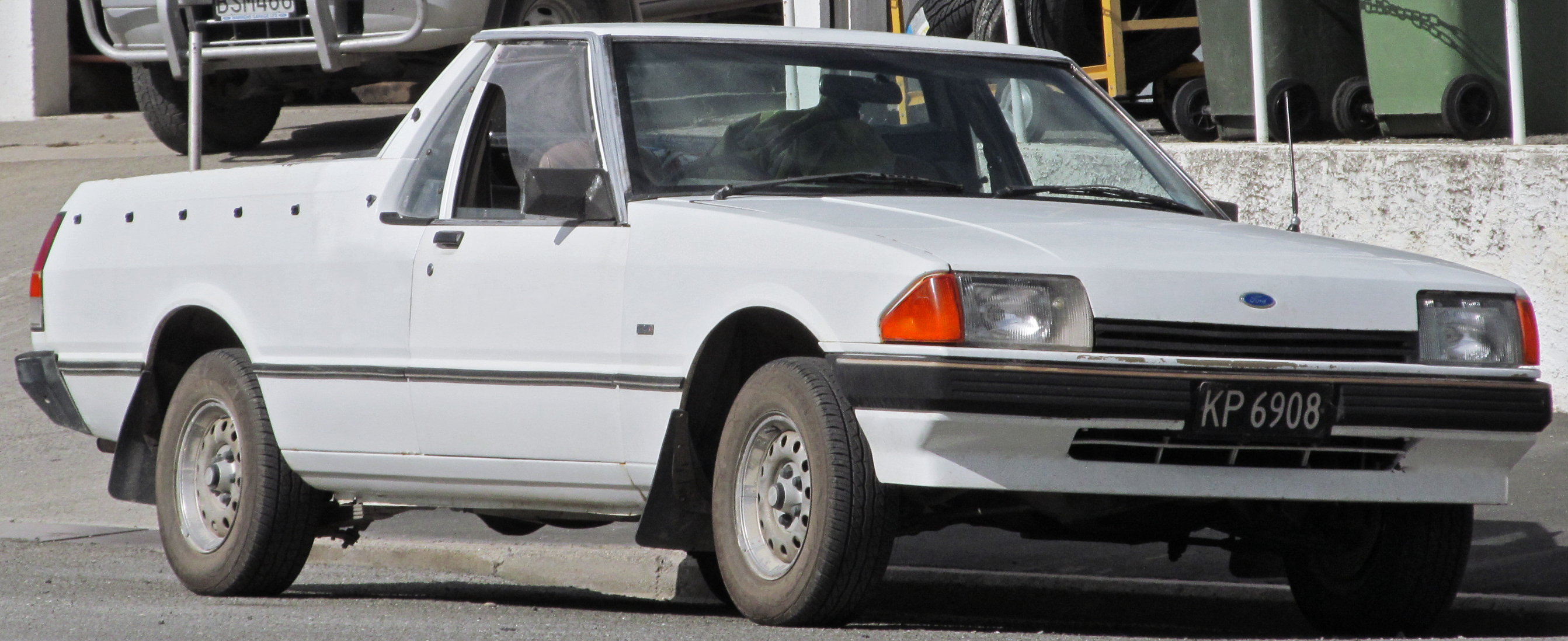
Falcon utility

=== European Sports Pack (ESP) ===
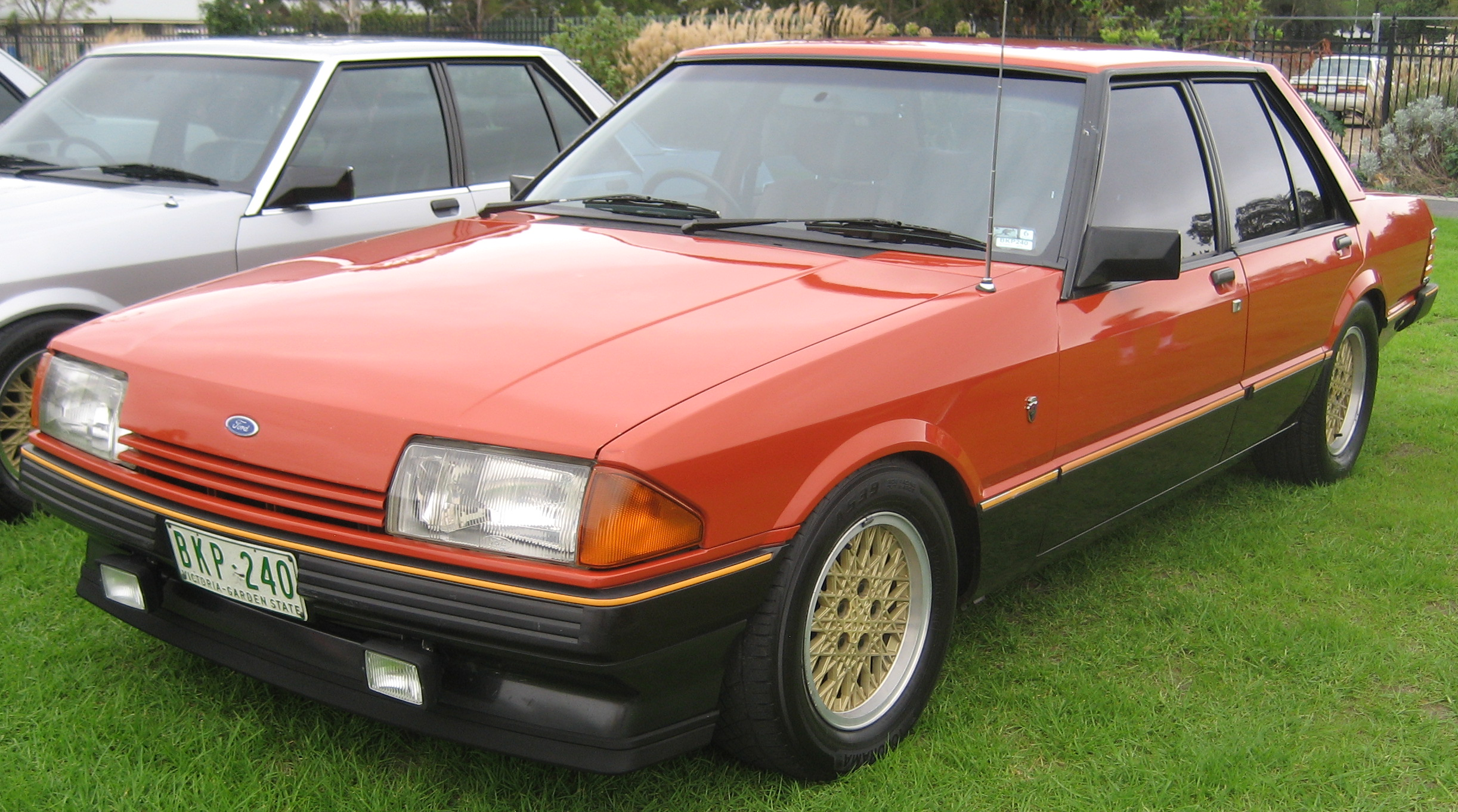
Fairmont Ghia ESP

The XE Fairmont Ghia ESP (option 54) was an optional pack that was chosen by the purchaser when ordering their new car, it varied in trim, styles and motors. Examples of ESP upgrades are, two-tone Charcoal-accented paint or base Ghia paint, Scheel-brand front bucket seats or Ghia Seats, 5.8 L (351 cu in) or 4.9 L (302 cu in) Cleveland V8 or 4.1 L (250 cu in) EFI Crossflow 6, 3 speed C4 auto or 4 speed single rail manual. Most ESP optioned Ghias are easily distinguishable from the Fairmont Ghia, however, many Option 54 Fairmont Ghias look so similar to the Fairmont Ghia that most owners of a used example do not realise they have an ESP as there is no code on the compliance plate to distinguish this. The only way to ascertain if a Fairmont Ghia is a genuine ESP is to contact Ford Australia with the compliance details and have the vehicles original purchase order examined for "option 54". The only common components of an XE ESP were the differential and rear brakes, "Option 54" included LSD and rear disc brakes as standard.

All 1982 built XE ESP 's were two toned with front/rear/side orange body moulds with Scheel Seats optioned in two colours one in Gun Metal Grey and the second in Sierra Tan in Colour with gold snowflake wheels. Build numbers on 1982 V8 XE ESP's total to 538 build as there is no numbers on the 6 cylinder XE ESP's numbers estimate at 200 or less. 351 – 178 (Manual optioned only) 302 – 100 (Manual) 302 – 260 (Auto) Total – 538 Build V8 XE. ESP's

Although the car was named European Sports Pack (ESP) as Ford had dropped the GT brand due to insurance purposes, the XE ESP V8 Falcons were essentially an '80s model GT Falcon. With the Cleveland being dropped in 1982, Ford continued the production in the 1983/1984 XE ESP with a single-toned coloured car with a 6-cylinder EFI motor. The exterior paint of the car looked the same as the XE Ghia, but the Scheel, a Gunmetal interior, remained in the XE ESP along with its gold Snowflake wheels.

=== Dick Johnson Grand Prix Edition ===
The Dick Johnson Grand Prix Edition was developed as an alternative to the V8 powered Falcons before Group A regulations came into effect. It was powered by the same 4.1 L (250 cu in) 6 cylinder crossflow motor but featured a carburettor with turbocharger setup. Only 43 examples were built for sale by the Country Dealer Teams, making these extremely rare. This model was intended for racing homologation but was never raced.

=== XE Phase 6 ===
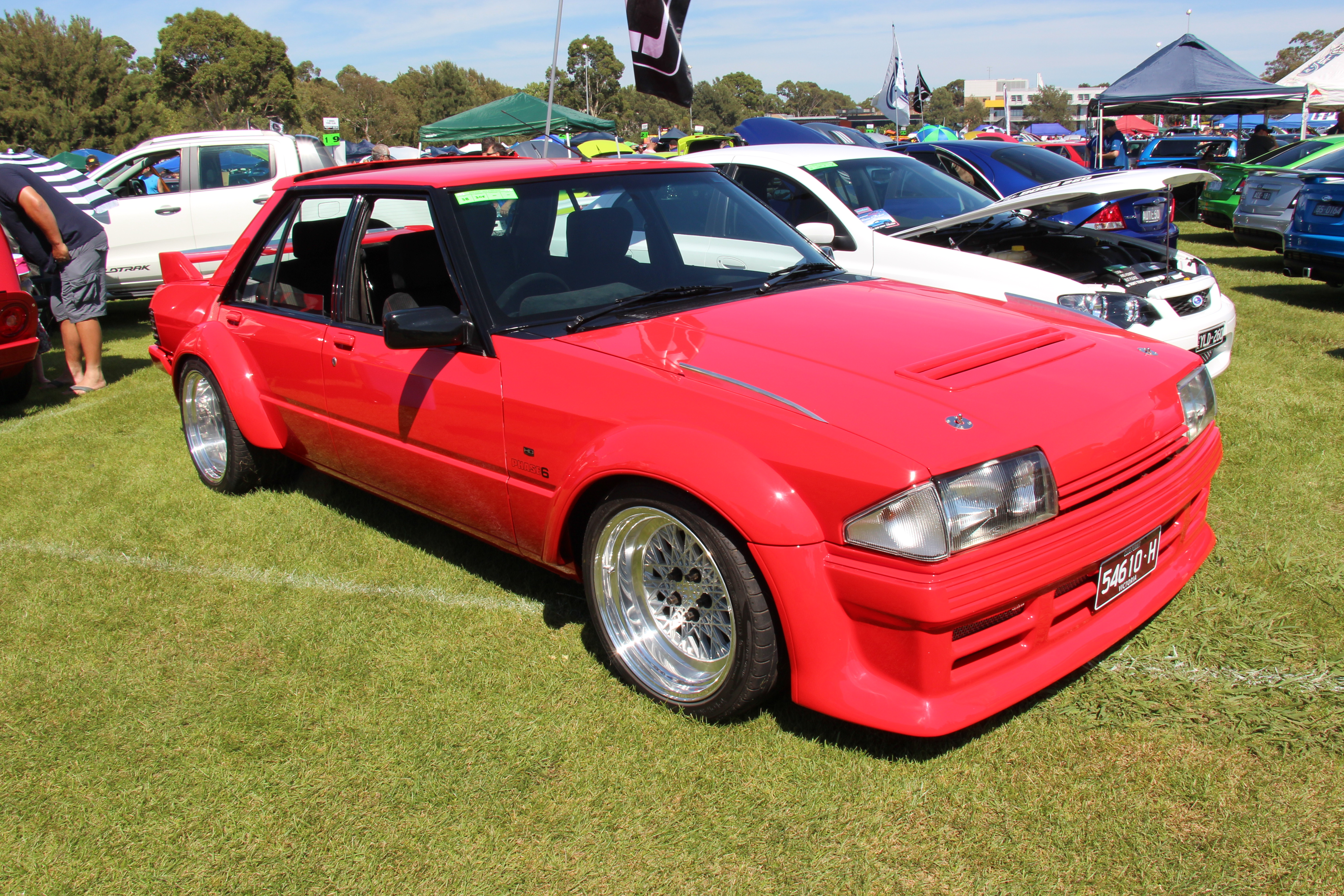
Falcon Phase 6

Wayne Draper, designer of the XD and XE Falcons at Ford, was also the designer of the aftermarket based Phase 5 XD Falcon using his HO Phase Autos business in the early eighties. When Ford abandoned HO, Draper bought the rights to the HO name. HO Phase Autos were the original manufacturers of the aerodynamic kits for the Group C racing Falcons.

The Series 1 XE Phase 6 was altered for racing, like the Phase 5 XD, to comply with CAMS regulations. Ford had to remove the original wing and replaced it with the DJR racing rear air dam that created more drag to fit regulations.

The Series 2 XE Phase 6 is cosmetically updated with mirrors and door trims from the later XF Falcon.

== Market and reception ==
The XE Falcon / ZK Fairlane / FD LTD range of cars combined to become the first automobiles to receive a prestigious Australian Design Award.

As the fuel crisis eased, Australians moved away from the smaller Holden Commodore and four-cylinder medium-sized cars back to the traditional full-size Falcon. In 1982, the Falcon became Australia's top-selling car for the year, a title it last held in 1977, eclipsing its compact Holden rival for the first time with annual sales of 84,184 units to 78,429 units for the Commodore. The XE and its successors went on to top the annual sales charts through to 1988.

Production totalled 193,890 units prior to the replacement of the XE by the XF Falcon in October 1984.

== Motorsport ==
Dick Johnson won the 1984 Australian Touring Car Championship behind the wheel of a Group C specification 5.8 L (351 cu in) XE Falcon sedan, commonly known as "Greens Tuf" (due to the cars green paint and the name of one of the steel products from the main sponsor – Palmer Tube Mills). This final evolution of Greens Tuf was rated at 360 kW (480 hp) and was retired at the end of 1984 when the Group C-era ended. It is now part of the David Bowden collection.

Sydney based driver Steve Masterton also used an XE Falcon to win the Amaroo Park based AMSCAR Series in 1984.

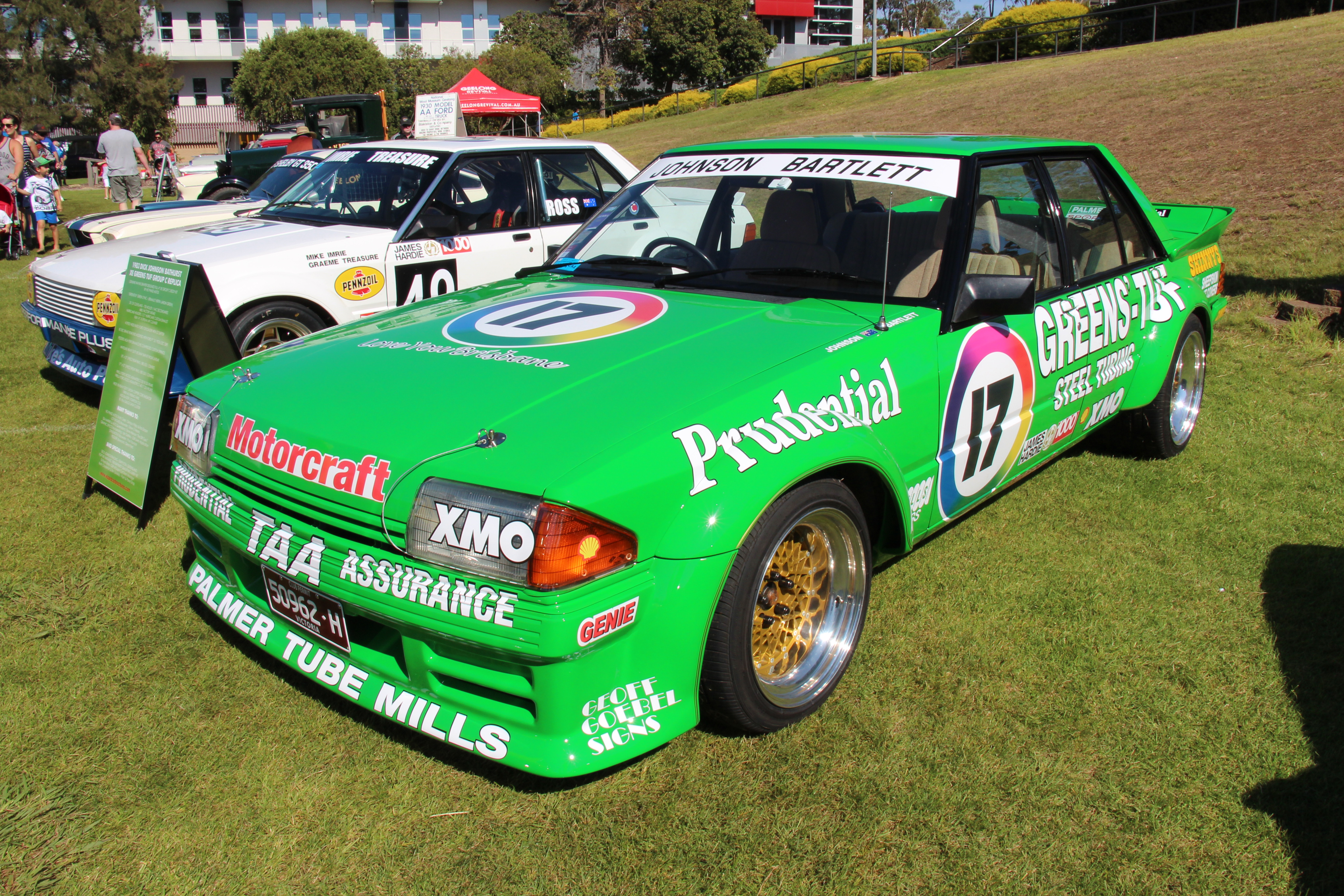
A replica of Dick Johnsons XE Falcon Race Car
