= 1990 Sandown 500 =

Track map of the Sandown Raceway

The 1990 Sandown 500 was an endurance race for Group 3A Touring Cars. The event was held at Sandown Park in Victoria, Australia on 9 September 1990. The race distance was 161 laps of the 3.10 km circuit, totaling 499 km. It was Round 1 of the 1990 Australian Endurance Championship and Round 1 of the 1990 Australian Manufacturers' Championship.

The race was won by Glenn Seton and George Fury driving a Ford Sierra RS500 for Peter Jackson Racing.

== Divisions ==
Cars competed in three Divisions.

- Division 1 :
- Division 2 :
- Division 3 : Under 1600cc

== Results ==
=== Top 10 Qualifiers ===
Although no official Top 10 run off was held during qualifying for the Sandown 500, the top 10 qualifiers were:

Pos	No	Team	Driver	Car	Qual
1	17	Shell Ultra Hi Racing	(Australia) Dick Johnson	Ford Sierra RS500	1:15.24
2	35	Peter Jackson Racing	(Australia) Glenn Seton	Ford Sierra RS500	1:15.31
3	28	Playscape Racing	(Australia) Kevin Waldock	Ford Sierra RS500	1:15.57
4	16	Holden Racing Team	(United Kingdom) Win Percy	Holden VL Commodore SS Group A SV	1:15.80
5	9	Allan Moffat Enterprises	(Germany) Klaus Niedzwiedz	Ford Sierra RS500	1:16.41
6	05	Mobil 1 Racing	(Australia) Peter Brock	Ford Sierra RS500	1:16.43
7	18	Shell Ultra Hi Racing	(United Kingdom) Jeff Allam	Ford Sierra RS500	1:16.44
8	6	Mobil 1 Racing	(Australia) Andrew Miedecke	Ford Sierra RS500	1:16.59
9	23	Beaurepaires Motorsport	(United Kingdom) Chris Lambden	Nissan Skyline HR31 GTS-R	1:17.01
10	11	Perkins Motorsport	(Australia) Larry Perkins	Holden VL Commodore SS Group A SV	1:17.44

=== Race ===
Position	Division	No.	Entrant	Drivers	Car	Laps
1	Div.1	35	Peter Jackson Racing	(Australia) Glenn Seton (Australia) George Fury	Ford Sierra RS500	161
2	Div.1	6	Mobil 1 Racing	(Australia) Charlie O'Brien (Australia) Peter Brock	Ford Sierra RS500	161
3	Div.1	28	Playscape Racing	(Australia) Kevin Waldock (Australia) Mike Preston	Ford Sierra RS500	158
4	Div.1	05	Mobil 1 Racing	(Australia) Peter Brock (Australia) Andrew Miedecke (Australia) David Parsons	Ford Sierra RS500	151
5	Div.1	15	Toyota Team Australia	(Australia) John Smith (Australia) Drew Price	Toyota Supra Turbo A	149
6	Div.1	46	Gary Willmington	(Australia) Gary Willmington (Australia) Bryan Thomson	Toyota Supra Turbo A	144
7	Div.1	44	Daf Sandblasting	(Australia) Paul Trevethan (Australia) Andrew McDowell	Holden VL Commodore SS Group A	144
8	Div.3	78	Phoenix Motorsport	(Australia) Geoff Full (Australia) David Ratcliff	Toyota Sprinter AE86	139
9	Div.1	23	Beaurepaires Motorsport	(United Kingdom) Chris Lambden (Australia) Greg Crick	Nissan Skyline HR31 GTS-R	137
10	Div.1	19	Car-Trek Racing	(Australia) Bob Jones (New Zealand) Heather Spurle	Holden VL Commodore SS Group A SV	129
11	Div.1	22	Lusty Engineering	(Australia) Graham Lusty (New Zealand) Peter Janson	Holden VL Commodore SS Group A SV	127
NC	Div.3	74	Alexander Rotary	(Australia) Phil Alexander (Australia) Keith McCulloch	Toyota Corolla	117
DNF	Div.1	11	Perkins Engineering	(Australia) Larry Perkins (Australia) Tomas Mezera	Holden VL Commodore SS Group A SV	151
DNF	Div.1	38	Playscape Racing	(New Zealand) Andrew Bagnall (New Zealand) Robbie Francevic	Ford Sierra RS500	122
DNF	Div.1	9	Allan Moffat Enterprises	(West Germany) Klaus Niedzwiedz (Australia) Gregg Hansford	Ford Sierra RS500	111
DNF	Div.1	36	Peter Hudson	(Australia) Peter Hudson (Australia) Ian Clark (Australia) Ian Carrig	BMW 635 CSi	92
DNF	Div.3	71	Toyota Team Australia	(New Zealand) John Faulkner (Australia) Neal Bates	Toyota Corolla FX-GT AE82	85
DNF	Div.1	18	Shell Ultra Hi Racing	(United Kingdom) Jeff Allam (Australia) John Bowe (New Zealand) Paul Radisich	Ford Sierra RS500	60
DNF	Div.1	14	Murray Carter	(Australia) Murray Carter (Australia) Matt Wacker	Ford Sierra RS500	60
DNF	Div.3	75	Dow Airconditioning	(Australia) Dennis Rogers (West Germany) Llynden Reithmuller	Toyota Corolla FX-GT AE82	50
DNF	Div.3	70	Toyota Team Australia	(Australia) Peter McKay (Australia) Paul Stokell	Toyota Corolla AE92	49
DNF	Div.2	53	Brian Bolwell Racing	(Australia) Mike Twigden (Australia) Brian Bolwell	BMW 323i	37
DNF	Div.1	16	Holden Racing Team	(United Kingdom) Win Percy (Australia) Neil Crompton	Holden VL Commodore SS Group A SV	32
DNF	Div.1	42	Car-Trek Racing	(Australia) John Lusty (Australia) Bernie Stack	Holden VL Commodore SS Group A SV	27
DNF	Div.1	17	Shell Ultra Hi Racing	(Australia) Dick Johnson (Australia) John Bowe	Ford Sierra RS500	18
DNS	Div.1	86	Gemspares	(Australia) Daryl Hendrick (Australia) Joe Sommariva	Holden VL Commodore SS Group A SV	-
DNS	Div.3	72	David Sala	(Australia) David Sala (Australia) Richard Vorst	Toyota Corolla FX-GT AE82	-

27 cars qualified for the race and 25 started.

Note:

- NC = Not classified
- DNF = Did not finish
- DNS = Did not start

== Statistics ==
- Pole Position - #17, Dick Johnson (Ford Sierra RS500 Cosworth), 1:15.22
- Fastest Lap - #17, Dick Johnson (Ford Sierra RS500 Cosworth), 1:16.21

== See also ==
1990 Australian Touring Car season

Preceded by 1989 .05 - 500	Sandown 500; 1990	Succeeded by 1991 Don't Drink Drive Sandown 500
