= 1987 Castrol 500 =

Australian Automotive Race

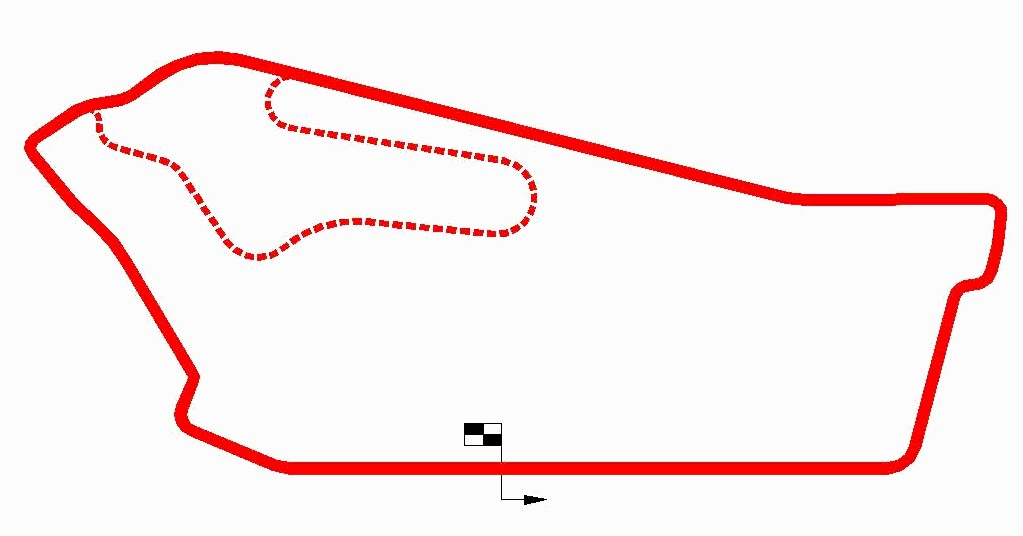
Layout of the Sandown Raceway international circuit (1984-1998)

The 1987 Castrol 500 was a race for Touring Cars complying with Appendix C of the National Competition Rules of the Confederation of Australian Motor Sport (commonly known as Group A Touring Cars). The event was staged on 13 September 1987 over 129 laps of the 3.9 km Sandown circuit in Victoria, Australia, a total distance of 503 km.

The race, the 22nd Sandown 500, was won by George Fury and Terry Shiel, driving a Nissan Skyline DR30 RS.

== Summary ==
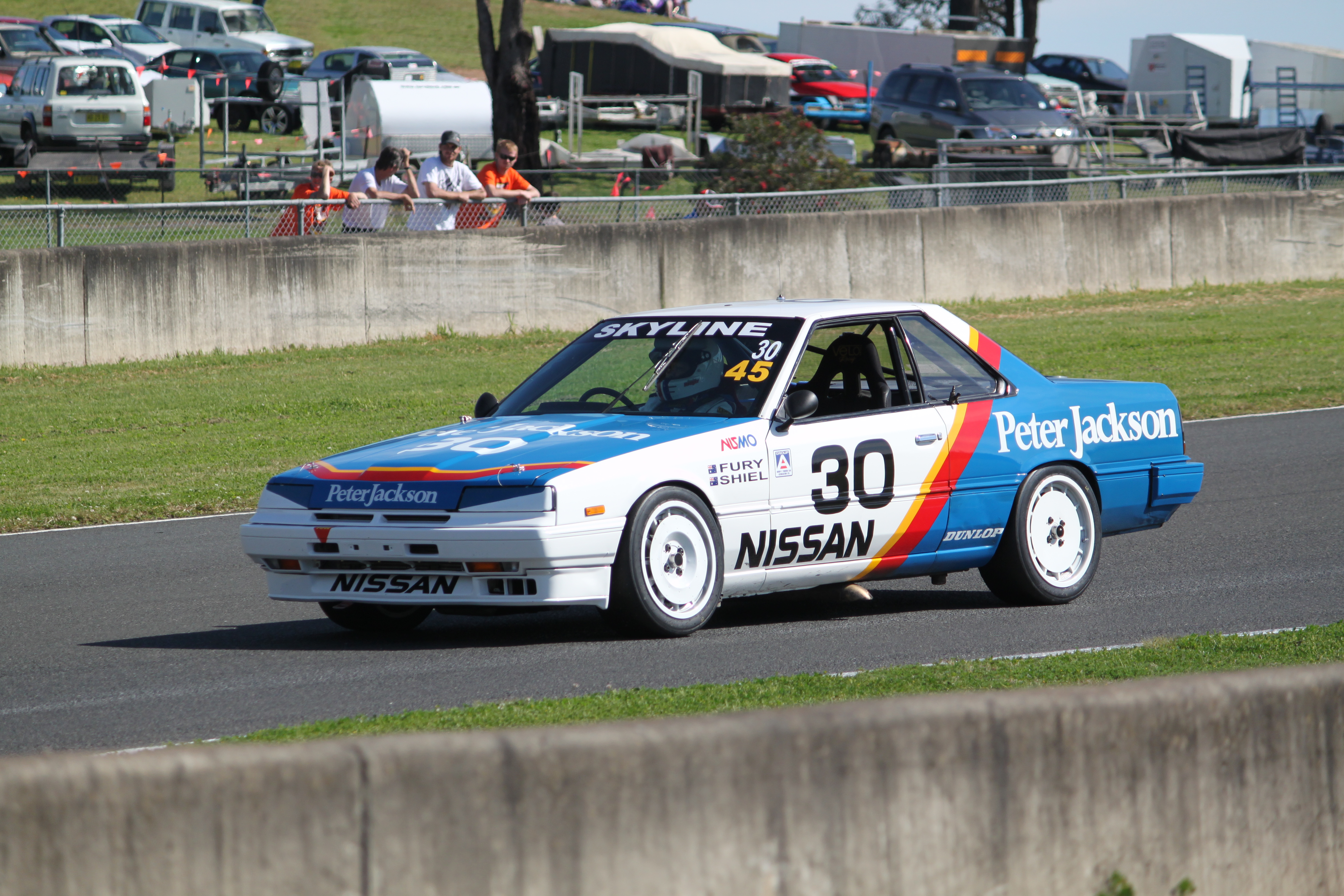
George Fury and Terry Shiel won the race driving a Nissan Skyline DR30 RS.

=== Qualifying ===
The race saw the Australian debut of the evolution Ford Sierra RS500. Although none of the four Sierras finished the race (two in fact did not start), the new 470 bhp (350 kW; 477 PS) model proved it would be the car to beat at 1987 James Hardie 1000. Andrew Miedecke in his Oxo Supercubes Sierra (an Andy Rouse kit car) attained provisional pole position in qualifying with a time of 1:49.45 before his weekend ended when co-driver Don Smith rolled the car at the end of pit straight, just prior to the end of qualifying. Dick Johnson went even better in the Dulux Dozen runoff for pole with a time of 1:47.59, almost two seconds quicker than Miedecke's time earlier in the day. This time would remain the fastest ever Group A touring car time recorded on the 3.9 km long international circuit.

Peter Brock attracted pre-race criticism for his decision to have Channel 7 television commentator Neil Crompton as the second driver of the Mobil 1 team's Holden Commodore with accusations of it being nothing more than a PR exercise after the bad press the team had received in 1987 in the wake of Brock's split with Holden. With new Bridgestone tyres and an adjustable rear end developed by the team that allowed negative camber of the rear tyres transforming the handling of the Commodore, plus some extra engine development up to and following the Spa 24 Hours bringing power up to a respectable 420 bhp (313 kW; 426 PS), Brock himself qualified fifth, only a couple of tenths behind Allan Grice's Les Small prepared Roadways VL Commodore and some 1.5 seconds faster than Larry Perkins in the older model VK. Both Grice and Perkins were running engines with approximately 40 bhp (30 kW; 41 PS) more than the HDT cars.

=== Race ===
The 1987 Castrol 500 was won by the Peter Jackson Nissan Racing Skyline DR30 RS of George Fury and Terry Shiel. The win continued the Nissan team's winning streak at Sandown in 1986 and 1987 with the Skyline, having won the ATCC rounds at the circuit in both years as well as Fury and Glenn Seton having won the 1986 Castrol 500. They won by a lap from the V8 Holden VK Commodore of Larry Perkins and Denny Hulme with the New Zealand Nissan Skyline of Kent Baigent and Graeme Bowkett a further lap back in third place. Kiwis Kaigent and Bowkett continued to impress with their speed in the privateer Skyline, never falling out of the top five during the race except during pit stops. The NZ Skyline was engineered by Jim and Ross Stone who would later go on to work with both Andrew Miedecke and Dick Johnson Sierra's over the next few seasons before forming their own team Stone Brothers Racing. The car also featured a lot of technical input from the Peter Jackson team.

The Ford Sierra of pole sitter Dick Johnson suffered an engine failure in the race morning warmup which forced him and Gregg Hansford to move to the team's car. After starting from 14th on the grid, Johnson showed the speed of the new Sierra by storming to the front after just 7 laps, leaving the BMW's, Commodores and turbo Nissans in his wake on Sandown's long front and back straights. Johnson would go on to set a Group A lap record of 1:50.28 before the #18 car was retired with engine failure on lap 86.

The JPS Team BMW M3 of Jim Richards and Tony Longhurst held second place late in the race and Richards was contesting the lead with Fury on the now damp track due to light rain until the 2.3 L engine lost oil pressure on lap 118. Just five laps earlier, the Holden VL Commodore of Peter Brock had been holding a strong third place comfortably in front of Perkins until his front brakes suddenly gave out at the end of pit straight. Brock slid sideways into the sandtrap and was lucky not to roll the Commodore after the driver's side wheels dug into the sand.

The Up to 2000cc class was won by the Peter Jackson Nissan Gazelle of young gun Mark Skaife and part-time sports sedan racer Grant Jarrett from the Toyota Team Australia Corolla of Mike Quinn and John Faulkner and the Toyota Sprinter of Sydney veterans Bob Holden and Garry Willmington.

=== Television coverage ===
Australian broadcasters Channel Seven covered both the Saturday shootout and the entire race. A copy can be found online at: https://www.youtube.com/watch?v=m7T0WZGc7hA

== Classes ==
Cars competed in three engine capacity classes:

- Class A: 3001 cc - 6000 cc
- Class B: 2001 cc - 3000 cc
- Class C: Up to 2000 cc

== Results ==
=== Dulux Dozen ===
Pos	No	Team	Driver	Car	Time
Pole	17	Shell Ultra-Hi Tech Racing Team	(Australia) Dick Johnson	Ford Sierra RS500	1:47.59
2	1	JPS Team BMW	(New Zealand) Jim Richards	BMW M3	1:48.43
3	30	Peter Jackson Nissan Racing	(Australia) George Fury	Nissan Skyline DR30 RS	1:49.43
4	2	Roadways Racing	(Australia) Allan Grice	Holden VL Commodore SS Group A	1:49.63
5	05	HDT Racing P/L	(Australia) Peter Brock	Holden VL Commodore SS Group A	1:49.81
6	25	Team Nissan Racing NZ	(New Zealand) Graeme Bowkett	Nissan Skyline DR30 RS	1:50.01
7	3	JPS Team BMW	(West Germany) Ludwig Finauer	BMW M3	1:51.14
8	15	Peter Jackson Nissan Racing	(Australia) Glenn Seton	Nissan Skyline DR30 RS	1:51.18
9	11	Enzed Team Perkins	(Australia) Larry Perkins	Holden VK Commodore SS Group A	1:51.31
10	14	NetComm (Aust)	(Australia) Murray Carter	Nissan Skyline DR30 RS	1:53.92
11	6	HDT Racing P/L	(Australia) Jon Crooke	Holden VL Commodore SS Group A	1:54.37
12	8	Supa Salvage	(Australia) Warren Cullen	Holden VK Commodore SS Group A	1:57.24

=== Race ===
Position	Class	No.	Entrant	Drivers	Car	Laps
1	B	30	Peter Jackson Nissan Racing	(Australia) George Fury (Australia) Terry Shiel	Nissan Skyline DR30 RS	129
2	A	11	ENZED Team Perkins	(Australia) Larry Perkins (New Zealand) Denny Hulme	Holden VK Commodore SS Group A	128
3	B	25	Team Nissan Racing NZ	(New Zealand) Kent Baigent (New Zealand) Graeme Bowkett	Nissan Skyline DR30 RS	127
4	A	6	Mobil HDT	(Australia) Jon Crooke (Australia) Neil Crompton	Holden VL Commodore SS Group A	126
5	B	3	JPS Team BMW	(West Germany) Ludwig Finauer (New Zealand) Robbie Francevic	BMW E30 M3	125
6	B	14	Netcomm (Aust) Racing	(Australia) Murray Carter (Australia) Denis Horley	Nissan Skyline DR30 RS	125
7	B	40	K Wills	(New Zealand) Kieran Wills (New Zealand) Phillip Henley	Nissan Skyline DR30 RS	124
8	B	43	G Lorrimer	(New Zealand) Graham Lorimer (New Zealand) John Sax	BMW E30 M3	123
9	A	19	Everlast Battery Service	(Australia) Bill O'Brien (Australia) Brian Sampson	Holden VL Commodore SS Group A	123
10	C	60	Peter Jackson Nissan Racing	(Australia) Mark Skaife (Australia) Grant Jarrett	Nissan Gazelle	121
11	A	38	W Clift	(Australia) Wayne Clift (Australia) Bernie Stack	Holden VK Commodore SS Group A	121
12	A	36	Grellis Marketing	(Australia) Ray Ellis (Australia) John Lusty	Holden VL Commodore SS Group A	120
13	C	31	Toyota Team Australia	(Australia) Mike Quinn (New Zealand) John Faulkner	Toyota Corolla	119
14	A	29	Mulvihill Motorsports Pty Ltd	(Australia) Tony Mulvihill (Australia) Ken Matthews	Holden VK Commodore SS Group A	119
15	B	78	B Bolwell	(Australia) Brian Bolwell (Australia) Rod Smith	BMW 323i	117
16	B	24	Lockwood Bryce Homes	(Australia) Bill Bryce (Australia) Leo Geoghegan	BMW 325i	116
17	A	20	Salisbury North Service Station	(Australia) Des Wall (Australia) John Virgo	BMW 635 CSi	116
18	A	21	Lusty Engineering Pty Ltd	(Australia) Graham Lusty (Australia) Ken Lusty	Holden VL Commodore SS Group A	115
19	C	13	Bob Holden Motors Manly Vale	(Australia) Bob Holden (Australia) Garry Willmington	Toyota Sprinter	115
20	A	22	DFC New Zealand Limited	(New Zealand) C Castle (New Zealand) John Billington	Holden VK Commodore SS Group A	114
21	A	23	Yellow Pages Racing	(Australia) Tony Kavich (Australia) Kerry Baily	Holden VK Commodore SS Group A	113
22	C	88	D Sala	(Australia) David Sala (Australia) Dale Smart	Isuzu Gemini	111
23	C	86	Gemspares	(Australia) Daryl Hendrick (Australia) John White	Isuzu Gemini	106
DNF	B	1	JPS Team BMW	(New Zealand) Jim Richards (Australia) Tony Longhurst	BMW E30 M3	118
DNF	A	7	CANAM Enterprises	(New Zealand) Graeme Cameron (New Zealand) Wayne Wilkinson	Holden VL Commodore SS Group A	116
DNF	A	05	Mobil HDT	(Australia) Peter Brock (Australia) David Parsons	Holden VL Commodore SS Group A	113
DNF	A	8	Warren Cullen	(Australia) Warren Cullen (Australia) Gary Cooke	Holden VK Commodore SS Group A	99
DNF	B	44	Viacard Services	(New Zealand) Trevor Crowe (Australia) Jim Keogh	BMW E30 M3	93
DNF	C	32	Toyota Team Australia	(Australia) Drew Price (Australia) John Smith	Toyota Corolla	91
DNF	B	18	Shell Ultra-Hi Tech Racing Team	(Australia) Dick Johnson (New Zealand) Neville Crichton (Australia) Gregg Hansford	Ford Sierra RS500	86
NC	B	15	Peter Jackson Nissan Racing	(Australia) Glenn Seton (Australia) John Bowe	Nissan Skyline DR30 RS	86
DNF	C	58	Ratcliff Transport Spares	(Australia) David Ratcliffe (Australia) Mark Gibbs	Toyota Corolla Levin	84
DNF	B	34	Oxo Supercube Motorsport	(Australia) John Giddings (Australia) Bruce Stewart	Ford Sierra RS500	82
NC	A	28	Capri Components	(Australia) Lawrie Nelson (Australia) Bob Jolly	Ford Mustang	78
DNF	A	4	CANAM Enterprises	(New Zealand) Graeme Crosby (New Zealand) Graham McRae	Holden VK Commodore SS Group A	74
DNF	A	42	Jagparts Racing	(Australia) Gerald Kay (Australia) Alf Grant	Holden VK Commodore SS Group A	73
NC	B	10	Reithmuller-Ward Int. Motorsport	(Australia) Phil Ward (West Germany) Llynden Reithmuller (Australia) Chris Clearihan	Mercedes-Benz 190E 190 E 2.3-16	55
DNF	A	45	L Smerdon	(Australia) Lester Smerdon (Australia) Bruce Willams	Holden VK Commodore SS Group A	43
DNF	A	12	RG Lanyon	(Australia) Peter McLeod (Australia) Peter Fitzgerald	Holden VK Commodore SS Group A	17
DNF	A	2	Bob Jane T-Marts	(Australia) Allan Grice (United Kingdom) Win Percy	Holden VL Commodore SS Group A	10
DNF	A	27	Sunliner	(Australia) Tony Hunter (Australia) Warren McKellar	Holden VK Commodore SS Group A	1
DNS	B	17	Shell Ultra-Hi Tech Racing Team	(Australia) Dick Johnson (Australia) Gregg Hansford	Ford Sierra RS500	
DNS	B	35	Oxo Supercube Motorsport	(Australia) Andrew Miedecke (Australia) Don Smith	Ford Sierra RS500	

== Statistics ==
- Pole Position – #17 Dick Johnson - Ford Sierra RS500 – 1:47.59
- Fastest Lap – #18 Dick Johnson - Ford Sierra RS500 – 1:50.28 (new lap record)
- Race time of winning car - 4:10:28.06

== See also ==
- 1987 Australian Touring Car season

Preceded by 1986 Castrol 500	Castrol 500; 1987	Succeeded by 1988 Enzed 500
