= 1989 .05 – 500 =

Track map of the Sandown Raceway

The 1989 .05 500 was an endurance race for Group 3A Touring Cars. The event was held at the Sandown circuit in Victoria, Australia on 10 September 1989 over 161 laps of the 3.10 km circuit, a total distance of 499 km. It was the 24th "Sandown 500". The race was sponsored by the Victorian Health Promotion Foundation with the race name referencing the blood alcohol limit for driving on Victorian roads.

The race was won by Jim Richards and Mark Skaife driving a Nissan Skyline HR31 GTS-R for Nissan Motor Sport. It was the last race in Australia for six time "Sandown 500" winner and defending race winner Allan Moffat who retired at the end of 1989.

== Classes ==
Cars competed in three classes:

- Class A: 2501cc & over
- Class B: 1601cc-2500cc
- Class C: under 1600cc

== Top Ten Shootout ==
The Top Ten Shootout, which determined the final grid order of the fastest ten cars from Qualifying, was run on a wet track. As a result, times were between 5 and 12 seconds slower than the drivers qualifying times.

Pos	No	Team	Driver	Car	TTS	Qual
Pole	17	Shell Ultra-Hi Racing	(Australia) Dick Johnson	Ford Sierra RS500	1:20.61	1:15.22
2	05	Mobil 1 Racing	(Australia) Peter Brock	Ford Sierra RS500	1:21.15	1:16.17
3	25	Benson & Hedges Racing	(Australia) Tony Longhurst	Ford Sierra RS500	1:23.59	1:15.27
4	6	Miedecke Motorsport	(Australia) Andrew Miedecke	Ford Sierra RS500	1:23.84	1:16.23
5	2	Nissan Motor Sport	(New Zealand) Jim Richards	Nissan Skyline HR31 GTS-R	1:24.29	1:16.25
6	30	Peter Jackson Racing	(Australia) Glenn Seton	Ford Sierra RS500	1:25.07	1:16.82
7	20	Benson & Hedges Racing	(Australia) Alan Jones	Ford Sierra RS500	1:25.42	1:16.25
8	3	Nissan Motor Sport	(Australia) George Fury	Nissan Skyline HR31 GTS-R	1:27.38	1:17.06
9	105	Mobil 1 Racing	(Australia) Brad Jones	Ford Sierra RS500	1:28.75	1:17.26
10	18	Shell Ultra-Hi Racing	(United Kingdom) Jeff Allam	Ford Sierra RS500	1:29.57	1:17.23

== Official results ==
Position	Class	No.	Entrant	Drivers	Car	Laps
1	A	2	Nissan Motor Sport	(New Zealand) Jim Richards (Australia) Mark Skaife	Nissan Skyline HR31 GTS-R	161
2	A	16	Holden Racing Team	(United Kingdom) Win Percy (Australia) Larry Perkins	Holden VL Commodore SS Group A SV	160
3	A	3	Nissan Motor Sport	(Australia) George Fury (New Zealand) Graeme Bowkett	Nissan Skyline HR31 GTS-R	160
4	A	30	Peter Jackson Racing	(Australia) Glenn Seton (Australia) John Goss	Ford Sierra RS500	159
5	A	17	Shell Ultra Hi Racing	(Australia) Dick Johnson (Australia) John Bowe	Ford Sierra RS500	159
6	A	7	Holden Racing Team	(Australia) Neil Crompton (Australia) Steve Harrington	Holden VL Commodore SS Group A SV	155
7	A	105	Mobil 1 Racing	(Australia) Brad Jones (Australia) Mark Larkham (Australia) Peter Brock	Ford Sierra RS500	155
8	A	6	Miedecke Motorsport	(Australia) Andrew Miedecke (Australia) Charlie O'Brien	Ford Sierra RS500	154
9	A	86	Gemspares	(Australia) Darryl Hendrick (Australia) John White	Holden VL Commodore SS Group A SV	148
10	C	32	Toyota Team Australia	(New Zealand) John Faulkner (Australia) Peter McKay	Toyota Corolla	143
11	C	33	Toyota Team Australia	(Australia) Michael Dowson (Australia) Neal Bates	Toyota Corolla	142
12	A	22	Lusty Engineering P/L	(Australia) Graham Lusty (Australia) Alfredo Costanzo	Holden VL Commodore SS Group A SV	136
13	B	50	W. R. Bryce	(New Zealand) Brett Riley (West Germany) Ludwig Finauer	BMW M3	134
14	C	78	Team Maddison Racing	(Australia) Geoff Full (Australia) Michael Adcock	Toyota Corolla	133
15	C	39	David Sala	(Australia) Richard Vorst (Australia) David Sala	Toyota Corolla	130
16	A	45	Clive Smith	(Australia) Clive Smith (Australia) Paul Trevethan	Nissan Skyline DR30 RS	128
17	A	14	Murray Carter	(Australia) Murray Carter (Australia) John Mann	Ford Sierra RS500	122
DNF	A	18	Shell Ultra Hi Racing	(United Kingdom) Jeff Allam (Australia) Tony Noske	Ford Sierra RS500	111
NC	C	51	Bob Holden Motors	(Australia) Dennis Rogers (Australia) Mark Ducquet (Australia) Kevin O'Neill	Toyota Sprinter	105
NC	C	13	Bob Holden Motors	(Australia) Bob Holden (Australia) Tim Hall	Toyota Corolla	98
NC	A	36	P. J. Hudson	(Australia) Ian Carrig (Australia) Ian Clark (Australia) Peter Hudson	BMW 635 CSi	95
DNF	A	23	Beaurepaires	(United Kingdom) Chris Lambden (Australia) Greg Crick	Holden VL Commodore SS Group A SV	90
DNF	A	55	Playscape Racing Australia	(Australia) Kevin Waldock (Australia) Bryan Thomson	Ford Sierra RS500	87
DNF	A	20	Benson & Hedges Racing	(Australia) Alan Jones (New Zealand) Denny Hulme	Ford Sierra RS500	87
DNF	A	25	Benson & Hedges Racing	(Australia) Tony Longhurst (New Zealand) Neville Crichton	Ford Sierra RS500	87
DNF	A	28	Joe Sommariva	(Australia) Joe Sommariva (Australia) Warren McKellar	BMW 635 CSi	75
DNF	A	05	Mobil 1 Racing	(Australia) Peter Brock (New Zealand) Paul Radisich	Ford Sierra RS500	61
DNF	A	24	Jagparts Racing	(Australia) Gerald Kay (Australia) Alf Grant	Holden VL Commodore SS Group A SV	53
DNF	A	9	Allan Moffat Enterprises	(Canada) Allan Moffat (Australia) Gregg Hansford	Ford Sierra RS500	12
DNF	A	19	Caltex CXT Race Team	(Australia) Colin Bond (Australia) Garry Rogers (Australia) Ken Mathews	Ford Sierra RS500	2

== Notes ==
- Pole Position - #17 Dick Johnson - 1:20.61
- Fastest Lap - #6 Andrew Miedecke - 1:17.02

== See also ==
1989 Australian Touring Car season

Preceded by 1988 Enzed 500	Sandown 500; 1989	Succeeded by 1990 Sandown 500
