= 1990 Australian Manufacturers' Championship =

The 1990 Australian Manufacturers' Championship was open to manufacturers of cars complying with CAMS Group 3A Touring car regulations and was contested over a four-round series.

== Schedule ==
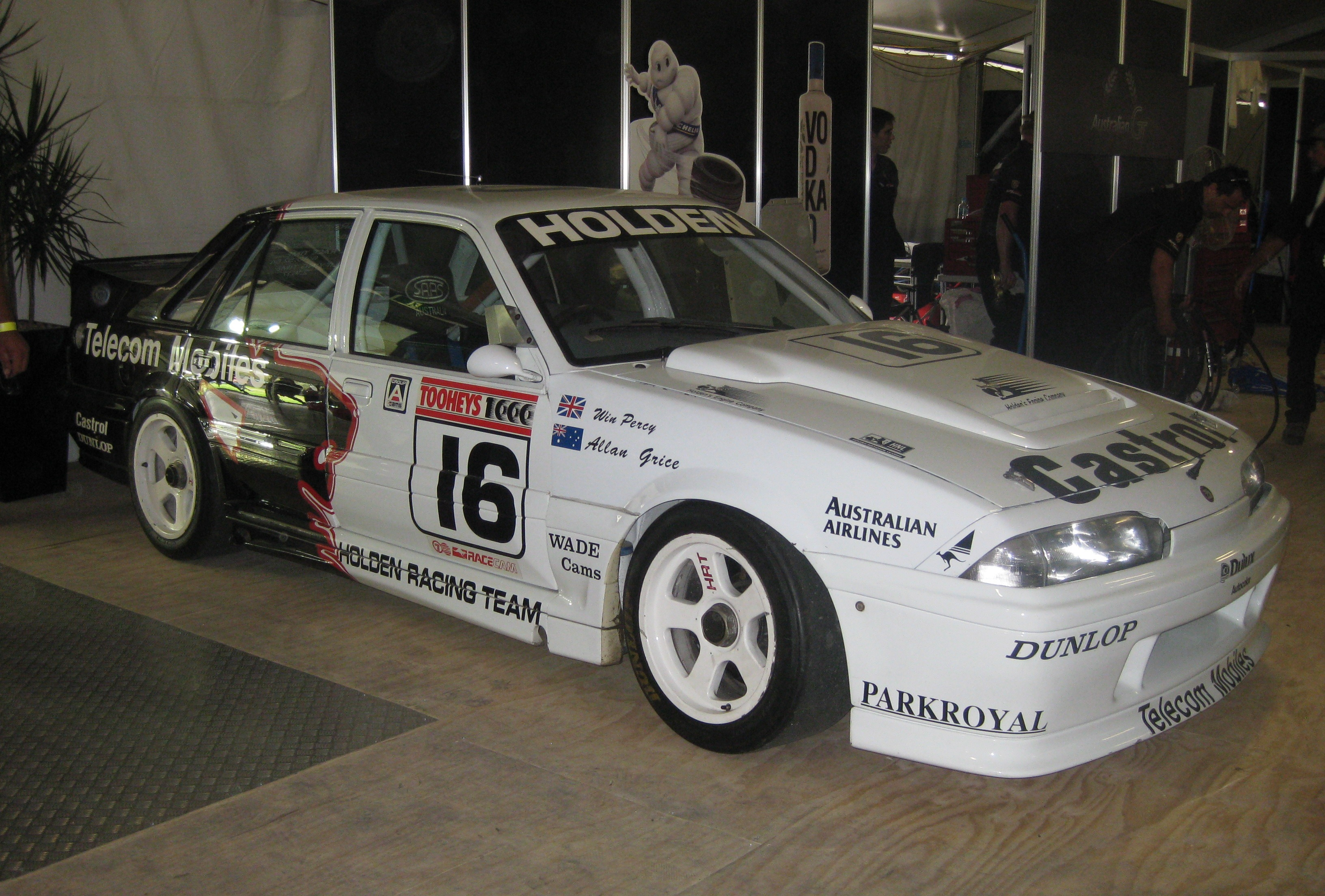
Win Percy and Allan Grice won the Bathurst round in a Holden VL Commodore SS Group A SV

- Round 1, Sandown 500, Sandown Raceway, Victoria, 9 September
- Round 2, Tooheys 1000, Mount Panorama Circuit, Bathurst, New South Wales, 30 September
- Round 3, Ansett Air Freight Challenge, Adelaide Parklands, South Australia, 3 & 4 November
- Round 4, Nissan Sydney 500, Eastern Creek Raceway, New South Wales, 10 November

Rounds were run concurrently with those of the 1990 Australian Endurance Championship.

"Australian Motor Racing Year, 1990/91" suggests that the championship win was tied between Ford & Holden however both the CAMS Manual of Motor Sport (post 1990 editions) and www.camsmanual.com.au state that the title was awarded solely to the Ford Motor Company of Australia.
