= George Fury =

Australian rally and racing driver (born 1945)

- Nationality: Australian
- Born: 31 January 1945 (age 81) Hungary

Australian Touring Car Championship
- Years active: 1982–90
- Teams: Nissan Motorsport Australia; Glenn Seton Racing
- Starts: 46
- Wins: 8
- Poles: 9
- Fastest laps: 5
- Best finish: 2nd in 1983 & 1986 Australian Touring Car Championship

Previous series
- 1975–80,90: Australian Rally Championship

Championship titles
- 1977 1980 1986 1987 1990: Australian Rally Championship; Australian Rally Championship; Sandown 500; Sandown 500; Sandown 500

George Fury (born 31 January 1945, in Hungary) is a retired Australian rally and racing car driver. For the majority of his career Fury was associated with Nissan, twice winning the Australian Rally Championship, and twice runner up in the Australian Touring Car Championship. Fury, a farmer living and working in the New South Wales country town of Talmalmo, was nicknamed "Farmer George" or "The Talmalmo Farmer".

== Rallying ==
Fury rose to prominence during the 1970s, first as part of the Bruce Wilkinson, and then Howard Marsden-run Datsun Rally Team, racing Datsun Violet 710 SSS and Datsun 1600s, winning the 1977 Australian Rally Champion (tied on points with Ross Dunkerton), later driving a Datsun Stanza, he won the Australian Championship in 1980. Fury also twice won the Southern Cross Rally in 1978 and 1979. Fury returned to rallying at the Australian championship level in 1990, where he drove the Ged Beckton-owned Mitsubishi Gallant VR-4 in the first two rounds of the championship, while Ross Runnalls navigated. Fury and Runnalls were immediately successful, winning the BP Rally of Tasmania. Next up was the BP Alpine Rally (Victorian round of the championship.) They won this event by 6 minutes and 32 seconds.

== Touring cars ==
=== Group C ===
A shift in emphasis in 1981 saw the Datsun Rally Team abandoned in favour of a circuit racing program for a turbo charged Nissan Bluebird. Fury joined former Ford works driver (under Marsden) Fred Gibson as drivers and proved instantly competitive despite running in the mid-car class, though he was still seen more as a rally driver and less as a circuit racer. The team's first outing was the 1981 James Hardie 1000 at Bathurst where the Gibson/Fury Bluebird qualified 43rd but retired after 30 laps with suspension failure.

Fury ran three rounds of the 1982 Australian Touring Car Championship in the Bluebird turbo and showed both his and the cars potential by finishing second behind the 5.8 L V8 powered Ford Falcon of eventual series champion Dick Johnson in Round 2 of the series at Calder Park in Melbourne. Fury would only contest one more round of the 1982 ATCC, retiring from Round 7 in Adelaide, and he would eventually finish 12th in the championship on 14 points. In the late season Endurance Championship races, Fury failed to finish in the Castrol 400 at the fast Sandown Park in Melbourne (Gibson would finish 8th outright and first in Class C). Fury and Gibson then teamed up for the James Hardie 1000 at Bathurst where they and their Japanese team mates Masahiro Hasemi and Kazuyoshi Hoshino proved how far both car and driver had come in 12 months, with both Bluebird turbos qualifying in the top-ten (Hasemi qualified third, Fury tenth). Unfortunately for Fury and Gibson, their race ended on just lap 40 with a blown head gasket.

Bathurst 1982 had shown that both Fury and the Bluebird were going to be competitive against the outright Holden Commodores, Ford Falcons and Mazda RX-7s in 1983. With the benefit of running in the "Up to and including 3000cc" class which gave bonus points for outright placings, Fury narrowly lost the 1983 Australian Touring Car Championship by six points to Allan Moffat after the Nissan team decided not to attend the final round of the series. Helped by the controversial point scoring system (e.g. Fury had scored 27 points for finishing second in the opening round at Calder while Moffat had 'only' scored 25 for winning), Fury led the entire championship despite not winning a race until the Nissan team boycotted the final round at Lakeside in Brisbane.

Fury scored his first two race wins with the opening two rounds of the 1983 Australian Endurance Championship at Amaroo Park (Silastic 300) and two weeks later at the Oran Park 250, before going on to qualify second for the James Hardie 1000 at Bathurst. Partnered with Gary Scott, the Bluebird failed to finish after gearbox failure on lap 130. The Bluebird carried an in-car Racecam camera for race broadcaster Channel 7 with Fury being able to talk to the commentary team while driving the car. During the race while stuck behind a slower car, the microphone captured him calling the driver of the slower car a "f***ing bastard". While Fury would later drive other cars with Racecam units, it was the last time he would use a live microphone while in the car. At the end of the year, Fury would win the "Berri Fruit Juices Trophy" Group C Support race at the Australian Grand Prix meeting at Calder, defeating the Holden Dealer Team Commodores of Bathurst winners Peter Brock and Larry Perkins.

Fury would qualify that the 1984 James Hardie 1000, on pole position for the final Group C Bathurst 1000 with a time of 2:13.85 in Hardies Heroes. The Bluebird was the only Group C car to ever lap the old 6.172 km (3.835 mi) Mount Panorama Circuit under 2:14.00 (Peter Brock got closest with a 2:14.03 in his V8 Holden Commodore in the same Hardies Heroes). As a mark of its continued development and competitiveness, the turbocharged Bluebird had qualified 3rd at Bathurst in 1982 (Hasemi), 2nd in 1983 (Fury) and 1st in 1984 (Fury).

Fury's lap time at Bathurst was not bettered by a touring car until qualifying for the 1990 Tooheys 1000 by Tony Longhurst in a Group A Ford Sierra RS500. Longhurst's time of 2:13.84 was set after the circuit was extended to 6.213 km in 1987. Fury's time was not bettered in the top-ten runoff until 1991 when Nissan team driver Mark Skaife recorded a 2:12.63 in a 4WD, twin-turbo Nissan GT-R.

Fury gave both Nissan and turbo charging its first win in the ATCC in 1984 when he won Round 7 of the championship at Lakeside. With the Nissan team missing several rounds of the championship to concentrate on engine development of the 1.8-litre Straight-4 turbo engine to improve both power and reliability, Fury could only finish 11th in the championship. Fury later claimed pole for the 1984 Castrol 500 at Sandown Raceway in Melbourne before going on to claim pole at Bathurst. Fury's pole time of 1:46.2 would remain the fastest ever touring car lap of the new 3.9 km International Circuit at Sandown.

Driving his Bluebird turbo, Fury won the last ever competitive Group C Touring Car race on the Australian mainland when he won the Group C support race at the 1984 Australian Grand Prix at Calder Park in Melbourne on 18 November. Fury led from pole and wasn't headed in the entire 25 lap race and won from the previously unbeaten HDT VK Commodore of Peter Brock with the VK Commodore of Warren Cullen finishing third.

=== Group A ===
In 1985, the adoption of International Group A put Fury on the sidelines for a year while the Nissan team developed the Nissan Skyline RS DR30 into competitive touring car. Fury did perform some guest drives for the Frank Gardner run JPS Team BMW, finishing 2nd with Neville Crichton at Sandown, but scoring a DNF at Bathurst. Fury's drive at Bathurst in the BMW 635 CSi will forever be remembered as he followed team mate and 1985 Australian Touring Car Champion Jim Richards into the sand trap on the outside of Hell Corner. Richards had just lapped Fury, but the pair were caught out as only moments before a Holden Commodore VK had blown its engine leaving oil on the road. The trip in the sand was to end Fury's race as sand got into the BMW's engine and caused engine failure just over 35 laps later. For Richards, who was leading at the time and spent 3 laps with George digging the cars out of the sand, it ultimately cost him and co-driver Tony Longhurst a chance of victory and what would have been a perfect score in the 1985 Australian Endurance Championship.

Returning to racing with the Fred Gibson run Peter Jackson Nissan team in 1986 where in its first year of competition Fury, driving the new Skyline, lost the 1986 Australian Touring Car Championship by just five points to Robbie Francevic despite winning five races of the ten round championship to Francevic's 3. Retirements at Round 1 at Amaroo Park (after grabbing pole in the cars first outing) and again in Round 4 at Adelaide hurt his chances as Francevic only failed to finish at Calder Park for Round 7. Fury served notice on how competitive the turbo Skyline was to be when he put the car on the front row for its debut race at Amaroo Park.

Fury won four of the six rounds of the 1986 Australian Endurance Championship, including winning the Castrol 500 at Sandown, but could only finish second behind Jim Richards after not starting the opening race at Amaroo Park and failing to finish at Bathurst where he had qualified third on the grid.

The emergence of Glenn Seton as a touring car driver, and two retirements in rounds three and four of the 1987 ATCC (despite finishing 3rd in the opening round at Calder behind winner Seton, and winning Round 2 a week later at Symmons Plains), saw pushed Fury into a supporting role for Seton for the remainder of the championship, but Fury still finished third in the championship behind Seton and Jim Richards who won his second ATCC driving a BMW M3.

George then teamed with Sydney driver Terry Shiel to win his second consecutive Sandown 500, before the pair went on to finish third at Bathurst which in 1987 was a round of the inaugural World Touring Car Championship.

1988 was a frustrating year for Nissan with an abbreviated program forced by development of the new HR31 GTS-R model Skyline into a competitive car. Jim Richards joined Nissan in 1989 replacing Seton who had departed to start his own team, but with the emergence of another young driver in Mark Skaife, Gibson saw a diminished role for Fury and released him at the end of the year. George Fury's final win ATCC win came in Round 7 of the 1989 ATCC when he scored a surprise win in wet conditions at the tight Winton Motor Raceway in country Victoria. With just four laps remaining, Fury pressured race leader Peter Brock into a rare spin to take the lead, but had to survive an almost disastrous last lap when he almost spun the Skyline in turn 2 which brought Brock's Ford Sierra RS500 back within striking distance. He then narrowly avoided the spinning Sierra of former Nissan team mate John Bowe in the esses to post the first non-Ford win in the ATCC since 1987.

Without a regular touring car drive in 1990, Fury returned to rallying, dominating the early rounds of the 1990 Australian Rally Championship until a lack of funding ended his run. He then joined former Nissan team mate Seton for the 1990 Australian Endurance Championship, where Fury and Seton won the 1990 Sandown 500 in a Ford Sierra. It would prove be Fury's last touring car race win.

In 1991, Fury qualified third for the 1991 James Hardie 12 Hour at Bathurst in a Mitsubishi Galant VR4. During the race the car encountered a problem with its engine computer when it didn't recognise the use of unleaded fuel. To repair the problem the battery had to be disconnected to erase its memory. Driving with Rod Jones and Brisbane touring car privateer Alf Grant, Fury finished the first Bathurst 12 Hour in 9th place.

== Retirement ==
Fury retired from motor racing at the end of 1991 and tended to stay away from the sport, preferring to live his life on his farm and driving the school bus in Talmalmo. However, in mid-2014 at the request of his former Nissan team mate and later team boss Fred Gibson, Fury was re-united with his Bathurst pole winning Bluebird turbo at the Winton raceway for a few laps of the circuit. It was the first time Fury had driven the car since the 1984 James Hardie 1000.

To celebrate the 30th anniversary of Fury's 1984 pole position at Bathurst, he drove the pole winning Bluebird again at Bathurst for some demonstration laps before the 2014 Supercheap Auto Bathurst 1000. The No. 36 Nissan Motorsport Altima L33 to be driven in the race by Michael Caruso and Dean Fiore wore a similar paint scheme as the No. 15 Bluebird driven by Fury 30 years earlier as a tribute to Nissan's first ever pole position on The Mountain. This continues the growing trend in recent years of V8 Supercar's sporting retro paint schemes at Bathurst to honour the anniversary of past significant moments (such as success or a noteworthy event) by manufacturers or individual teams on The Mountain.

== Career results ==
Season	Series	Position	Car	Team
1977	Australian Rally Championship	1st	Datsun 710 SSS	Datsun Rally Team
1980	Australian Rally Championship	1st	Datsun Stanza	Datsun Rally Team
1982	Australian Touring Car Championship	12th	Datsun Bluebird turbo	Nissan
1983	Australian Touring Car Championship	2nd	Nissan Bluebird turbo	Nissan
1983	Australian Endurance Championship	3rd	Nissan Bluebird turbo	Nissan Motorsport Australia
1984	Australian Touring Car Championship	11th	Nissan Bluebird turbo	Nissan Motorsport Australia
1985	Australian Endurance Championship	12th	BMW 635 CSi	JPS Team BMW
1986	Australian Touring Car Championship	2nd	Nissan Skyline DR30 RS	Peter Jackson Nissan Racing
1986	Australian Endurance Championship	2nd	Nissan Skyline DR30 RS	Peter Jackson Nissan Racing
1986	South Pacific Touring Car Championship	6th	Nissan Skyline DR30 RS	Peter Jackson Nissan Racing
1987	Australian Touring Car Championship	3rd	Nissan Skyline DR30 RS	Peter Jackson Nissan Racing
1988	Australian Touring Car Championship	13th	Nissan Skyline HR31 GTS-R	Peter Jackson Nissan Racing
1989	Australian Touring Car Championship	6th	Nissan Skyline HR31 GTS-R	Nissan Motorsport Australia
1990	Australian Touring Car Championship	13th	Ford Sierra RS500	Peter Jackson Racing
1990	Australian Endurance Championship	11th	Ford Sierra RS500	Peter Jackson Racing

=== Complete Australian Touring Car Championship results ===
(key) (Races in bold indicate pole position) (Races in italics indicate fastest lap)

Year	Team	Car	1	2	3	4	5	6	7	8	9	10	DC	Points
1982	Nissan Motor Australia	Datsun Bluebird Turbo	SAN; 10	CAL; 2	SYM	ORA	LAK	WAN	AIR	SUR; Ret			12th	14
1983	Nissan Motorsport Australia	Nissan Bluebird Turbo	CAL; 2	SAN; 4	SYM; 3	WAN; 2	AIR; 4	SUR; 4	ORA; 5	LAK			2nd	160
1984	Nissan Motorsport Australia	Nissan Bluebird Turbo	SAN; 5	SYM; Ret	WAN; Ret	SUR	ORA; Ret	LAK; 1	**AIR**; Ret				11th	40
1986	Peter Jackson Nissan Racing	Nissan Skyline DR30 RS	**AMA**; Ret	**SYM**; 2	**SAN**; 1	AIR; Ret	WAN; 1	SUR; 4	**CAL**; 1	LAK; 1	WIN; 2	ORA; 1	2nd	212
1987	Peter Jackson Nissan Racing	Nissan Skyline DR30 RS	CAL; 3	SYM; 1	LAK; Ret	**WAN**; Ret	AIR; 2	SUR; 4	**SAN**; 2	**AMA**; 4	ORA; 2		3rd	143
1988	Peter Jackson Nissan Racing	Nissan Skyline HR31 GTS-R	CAL	SYM	WIN	WAN	AIR; Ret	LAK	SAN; 8	AMA; 3	ORA		13th	15
1989	Nissan Motorsport Australia	Nissan Skyline HR31 GTS-R	AMA; 3	SYM; 10	LAK; 7	WAN; 9	MAL; 6	SAN	WIN; 1	ORA; 8			6th	46
1990	Peter Jackson Racing	Ford Sierra RS500	AMA	SYM	PHI	WIN	LAK	MAL	WAN	ORA; 3			13th	12

=== Complete World Touring Car Championship results ===
(key) (Races in bold indicate pole position) (Races in italics indicate fastest lap)

Year	Team	Car	1	2	3	4	5	6	7	8	9	10	11	DC	Points
1987	(Australia) Peter Jackson Nissan Racing	Nissan Skyline DR30 RS	MNZ	JAR	DIJ	NUR	SPA	BNO	SIL	BAT ovr:3 cls:3	CLD ovr:5 cls:2	WEL ovr:4 cls:3	FJI	NC	0

† Not registered for series & points

=== Complete Asia-Pacific Touring Car Championship results ===
(key) (Races in bold indicate pole position) (Races in italics indicate fastest lap)

Year	Team	Car	1	2	3	4	DC	Points
1988	(Australia) Peter Jackson Nissan Racing	Nissan Skyline HR31 GTS-R	BAT; Ret	WEL	PUK	FJI	NC	0

=== Complete Bathurst 1000 results ===
Year	Team	Co-drivers	Car	Class	Laps	Pos.	Class pos.
1981	(Australia) Nissan Motor Co.	(Australia) Fred Gibson	Nissan Bluebird Turbo	4 Cylinder	30	DNF	DNF
1982	(Australia) Nissan Motor Co.	(Australia) Fred Gibson	Nissan Bluebird Turbo	B	40	DNF	DNF
1983	Nissan Motor Co. Australia P/L	(Australia) Gary Scott	Nissan Bluebird Turbo	A	130	DNF	DNF
1984	Nissan Motor Co. Australia P/L	(Australia) Gary Scott	Nissan Bluebird Turbo	Group C	146	16th	14th
1985	(Australia) JPS Team BMW	(New Zealand) Neville Crichton	BMW 635 CSi	C	68	DNF	DNF
1986	(Australia) Peter Jackson Nissan Racing	(Australia) Glenn Seton	Nissan Skyline DR30 RS	B	114	DNF	DNF
1987	(Australia) Peter Jackson Nissan Racing	(Australia) Terry Shiel	Nissan Skyline DR30 RS	1	157	3rd	3rd
1988	(Australia) Peter Jackson Nissan Racing	(Australia) Mark Skaife	Nissan Skyline HR31 GTS-R	A	17	DNF	DNF
1989	Nissan Motorsport Australia	(Sweden) Anders Olofsson	Nissan Skyline HR31 GTS-R	A	160	4th	4th
1990	(Australia) Peter Jackson Racing	(Australia) Drew Price (United Kingdom) David Sears	Ford Sierra RS500	1	125	DNF	DNF

=== Complete Sandown 400/500 results ===
Year	Team	Co-drivers	Car	Class	Laps	Pos.	Class pos.
1982	(Australia) Nissan Motor Company		Nissan Bluebird Turbo	C	NA	DNF	DNF
1983	Nissan Motorsport Australia		Nissan Bluebird Turbo	Over 3000cc	NA	DNF	DNF
1984	Nissan Motorsport Australia	(Australia) Gary Scott	Nissan Bluebird Turbo	Over 3000cc	32	DNF	DNF
1985	(Australia) JPS Team BMW	(New Zealand) Neville Crichton	BMW 635 CSi	A	129	2nd	2nd
1986	(Australia) Peter Jackson Nissan Racing	(Australia) Glenn Seton	Nissan Skyline DR30 RS	B	129	1st	1st
1987	(Australia) Peter Jackson Nissan Racing	(Australia) Terry Shiel	Nissan Skyline DR30 RS	B	129	1st	1st
1988	(Australia) Peter Jackson Nissan Racing	(Australia) Mark Skaife	Nissan Skyline HR31 GTS-R	A	94	DNF	DNF
1989	Nissan Motorsport Australia	(New Zealand) Graeme Bowkett	Nissan Skyline HR31 GTS-R	A	160	3rd	3rd
1990	(Australia) Peter Jackson Racing	(Australia) Glenn Seton	Ford Sierra RS500	Div.1	161	1st	1st

=== Touring Car race wins (ATCC and AEC) ===
- 1983 Australian Endurance Championship – Silastic 300 at Amaroo Park and the Oran Park 250 at Oran Park
- 1983 Australian Grand Prix – Berri Fruit Juices Trophy – Group C Support Race at Calder Park
- 1984 Australian Touring Car Championship – Round 6 at Lakeside
- 1984 Australian Grand Prix – Group C Support Race at Calder Park
- 1986 Australian Touring Car Championship – Round 3 at Sandown, Round 5 at Wanneroo, Round 7 at Calder Park, Round 8 at Lakeside and Round 10 at Oran Park
- 1986 Australian Endurance Championship – BP Plus 300 at Surfers Paradise, Castrol 500 at Sandown, The Sun South Pacific 300 at Calder Park and the Pepsi 300 at Oran Park
- 1987 Australian Touring Car Championship – Round 2 at Symmons Plains
- 1987 Castrol 500 at Sandown
- 1989 Australian Touring Car Championship – Round 7 at Winton
- 1990 Australian Endurance Championship – Sandown 500 at Sandown

=== Complete WRC results ===
Year	Entrant	Car	1	2	3	4	5	6	7	8	9	10	11	12	13	14	WDC	Pts
1980	Team Datsun	Datsun 160J	MON	SWE	POR	KEN	GRC	ARG	FIN	NZL; 4	ITA	FRA	GBR	CIV			26th	10
1991	Shock Absorber Improvements	Mitsubishi Galant VR-4	MON	SWE	POR	KEN	FRA	GRE	NZL	ARG	FIN	AUS; Ret	ITA	CIV	ESP	GBR	NC	0

Sporting positions
Preceded by Ross Dunkerton	Australian Rally Champion shared with Ross Dunkerton; 1977	Succeeded by Greg Carr
Preceded by Ross Dunkerton	Australian Rally Champion; 1980	Succeeded by Geoff Portman
