= 1988 Enzed Sandown 500 =

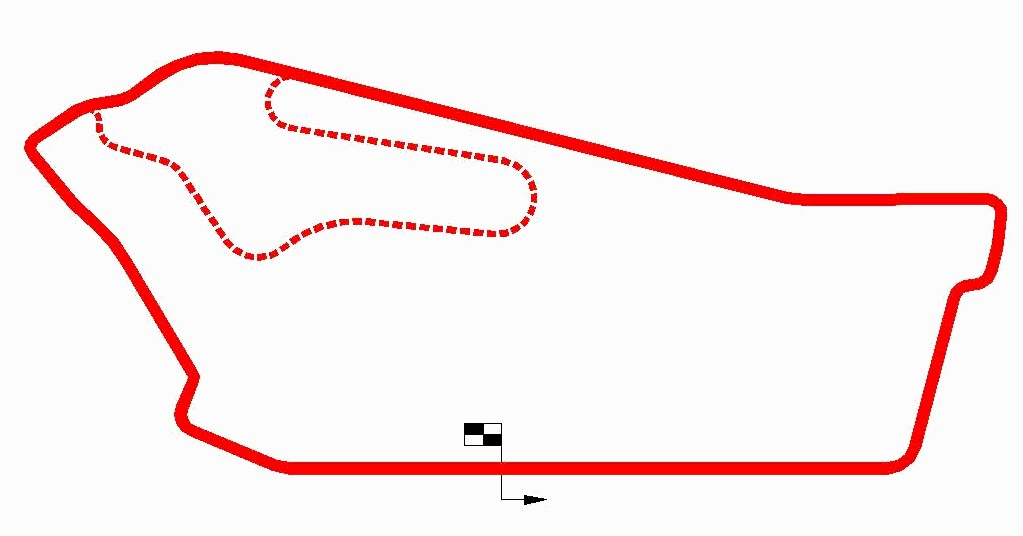
Layout of the Sandown Raceway international circuit (1984-1998)

The 1988 Enzed Sandown 500 was an endurance race for Group 3A Touring Cars. The event was held at the Sandown International Raceway in Victoria, Australia on 11 September 1988 over 129 laps of the 3.9 km circuit, a total distance of 503 km. This was the last time that the 3.9 km International configuration of the Sandown circuit was used for Australian touring car racing. The race was the 23rd running of the "Sandown enduro".

1988 would be the only year that New Zealand based hydraulic hose and connector repair company Enzed, a former sponsor of Larry Perkins, would sponsor the event.

Allan Moffat and Gregg Hansford won the race in their Eggenberger Motorsport built Ford Sierra RS500. It was Moffat's 6th and final Sandown enduro win having previously won in 1969, 1970, 1974, 1982 and 1983, while for Hansford it would be is only Sandown 500 win. It would also prove to be Moffat's final race win as both a driver and team owner in Australia. Second was the new Holden VL Commodore SS Group A SV of Larry Perkins and 1967 Formula One World Drivers' Champion Denny Hulme, while third after numerous troubles was the pole winning Sierra of Dick Johnson and John Bowe.

Class B was won by the Mobil 1 Racing BMW M3 of Peter Brock, Jim Richards and David Parsons which finished 7th outright, 7 laps down on the Moffat/Hansford Sierra. Class C was won by the Nissan Gazelle of David Sala and Ross Burbidge which finished 11th outright, 20 laps down on the Sierra.

The race was broadcast live throughout Australia by the ABC with commentary provided by Will Hagon, Peter Gee and Melbourne motor racing personality "Captain" Peter Janson with John Thompson doing the pit reports.

== Class structure ==
The race was contested in three displacement classes:

- Class A: Outright
- Class B: 2001 cc to 3000 cc
- Class C: Up to 2000 cc

== Results ==
=== Qualifying ===
Grid positions were determined by three 30 minute qualifying sessions. The first ten positions were:

Pos	No.	Entrant	Driver	Car	Time
1	17	Shell Ultra Hi Racing	(Australia) Dick Johnson	Ford Sierra RS500	1:46.94
2	25	Benson & Hedges Racing	(Australia) Tony Longhurst	Ford Sierra RS500	1:48.30
3	15	Peter Jackson Nissan Racing	(Australia) Glenn Seton	Nissan Skyline HR31 GTS-R	1:48.82
4	05	Mobil 1 Racing	(Australia) Peter Brock	BMW M3	1:50.04
5	8	Andrew Bagnall	(Australia) Andrew Miedecke	Ford Sierra RS500	1:50.09
6	10	Holden Special Vehicles	(Australia) Larry Perkins	Holden VL Commodore SS Group A SV	1:50.18
7	9	Allan Moffat Racing	(Canada) Allan Moffat	Ford Sierra RS500	1:50.40
8	30	Peter Jackson Nissan Racing	(Australia) George Fury	Nissan Skyline HR31 GTS-R	1:50.68
9	11	Holden Special Vehicles	(West Germany) Armin Hahne	Holden VL Commodore SS Group A SV	1:52.23
10	44	Caltex CXT Racing Team	(Australia) John Giddings	Ford Sierra RS500	1:52.24

=== Race ===
Position	Class	No.	Entrant	Drivers	Car	Laps
1	A	9	Allan Moffat Racing	(Canada) Allan Moffat (Australia) Gregg Hansford	Ford Sierra RS500	129
2	A	10	Holden Special Vehicles	(Australia) Larry Perkins (New Zealand) Denny Hulme	Holden VL Commodore SS Group A SV	129
3	A	17	Shell Ultra Hi Racing	(Australia) Dick Johnson (Australia) John Bowe	Ford Sierra RS500	125
4	A	26	Strathfield Car Radios	(Australia) Tony Noske (Australia) Graham Moore	Holden VL Commodore SS Group A SV	124
5	A	25	Benson & Hedges Racing	(Australia) Tony Longhurst (Australia) Tomas Mezera	Ford Sierra RS500	123
6	A	18	Shell Ultra Hi Racing	(Australia) John Smith (Australia) Alfredo Costanzo	Ford Sierra RS500	123
7	B	05	Mobil 1 Racing	(Australia) Peter Brock (New Zealand) Jim Richards (Australia) David Parsons	BMW M3	122
8	A	46	Sunliner Campmobiles	(New Zealand) Tony Hunter (Australia) Steve Harrington	Holden VK Commodore SS Group A	121
9	A	22	Lusty Engineering Pty Ltd	(Australia) Ken Lusty (Australia) Graham Lusty	Holden VL Commodore SS Group A SV	121
10	A	24	Jagparts Racing	(Australia) Gerald Kay (Australia) Geoff Munday	Holden VK Commodore SS Group A	117
11	C	88	David Sala	(Australia) David Sala (Australia) Ross Burbidge	Nissan Gazelle	109
12	A	42	Hella Australia P/L	(Australia) Matt Wacker (Australia) Larry Kogge	Nissan Skyline DR30 RS	99
NC	C	13	Bob Holden Motors	(Australia) Bob Holden (Australia) Garry Jones (Australia) Damon Beck	Toyota Sprinter	81
DNF	A	30	Peter Jackson Nissan Racing	(Australia) George Fury (Australia) Mark Skaife	Nissan Skyline HR31 GTS-R	94
DNF	A	36	Everlast Battery Service	(Australia) Bill O'Brien (Australia) Ray Lintott	Holden VL Commodore SS Group A SV	81
DNF	A	87	Joe Sommariva	(Australia) Joe Sommariva (Australia) Darrell Belsky (Australia) Warren McKellar	BMW 635 CSi	79
DNF	A	38	Grellis Marketing	(Australia) Ray Ellis (Australia) Bruce Williams	Holden VL Commodore SS Group A	78
DNF	B	34	Phil Ward Automotive Services Motor Racing Division	(Australia) Phil Ward (Australia) David Clement	Mercedes-Benz 190E	69
DNF	B	7	Mobil 1 Racing	(Australia) Neil Crompton (Australia) David Parsons (Australia) Peter Brock	BMW M3	58
DNF	A	11	Holden Special Vehicles	(United Kingdom) Jeff Allam (West Germany) Armin Hahne	Holden VL Commodore SS Group A SV	56
DNF	C	32	Toyota Team Australia	(New Zealand) Brett Riley (Australia) Peter McKay	Toyota Corolla	44
DNF	A	8	Andrew Bagnall	(Australia) Andrew Miedecke (New Zealand) Andrew Bagnall	Ford Sierra RS500	28
DNF	A	23	Beaurepaires Motorsport	(United Kingdom) Chris Lambden (Australia) Kerry Baily	Holden VL Commodore SS Group A SV	26
DNF	A	20	Terry Finnigan	(Australia) Terry Finnigan (Australia) Ken Mathews	Holden VL Commodore SS Group A SV	25
DNF	C	31	Toyota Team Australia	(Australia) Mike Oliver (Australia) Mike Freeman	Toyota Corolla	23
DNF	A	3	Yellow Pages	(Australia) Peter McLeod (Australia) Jim Keogh	Holden VL Commodore SS Group A SV	21
DNF	C	86	Gemspares	(Australia) Darryl Hendrick (Australia) John White	Isuzu Gemini ZZ	17
DNF	A	44	Caltex CXT Racing Team	(Australia) John Giddings (Australia) Bruce Stewart	Ford Sierra RS500	15
DNF	C	91	Bryan Bate Motors Ltd	(Australia) Bryan Bate (Australia) Andrew Maher	Toyota Corolla	11
DNF	A	28	Capri Components	(Australia) Lawrie Nelson (Australia) Bob Jolly	Ford Mustang	3
DNF	A	15	Peter Jackson Nissan Racing	(Australia) Glenn Seton (Sweden) Anders Olofsson	Nissan Skyline HR31 GTS-R	1
DNF	C	29	Toyota Team Australia	(Australia) Drew Price (New Zealand) John Faulkner	Toyota Corolla	1
DNS	A	4	Caltex CXT Racing Team	(Australia) Colin Bond (Australia) Alan Jones	Ford Sierra RS500	
DNS	A	14	Netcomm	(Australia) Murray Carter (Australia) Steve Masterton	Ford Sierra RS500	

Note: Car 13 was still running at the finish of the race but had not completed 75% of the race winners' distance.

== Statistics ==
- Pole Position - #17 Dick Johnson - 1:46.94
- Winners' race time: 4 hrs 4 mins 11.24 sec
- Fastest Lap - #17 John Bowe - 1:47.65 (lap 81 - new lap record)

== Race name ==
Sources differ in referring to the race as either the Enzed Sandown 500 or simply as the Enzed 500. The former is used in the Official Program and in the Provisional Results and has been used here.

== See also ==
1988 Australian Touring Car season

Preceded by 1987 Castrol 500	Sandown 500; 1988	Succeeded by 1989 .05 - 500
