= 1990 Australian Endurance Championship =

Seasons
- ← 1986 1991 →

The 1990 Australian Endurance Championship was the seventh running of the Australian Endurance Championship. It began on 9 September 1990 at Sandown Raceway and ended on 3 November at the Eastern Creek Raceway after three rounds. The championship was a CAMS sanctioned national motor racing title for drivers of Group 3A Touring Cars.

== Teams and drivers ==
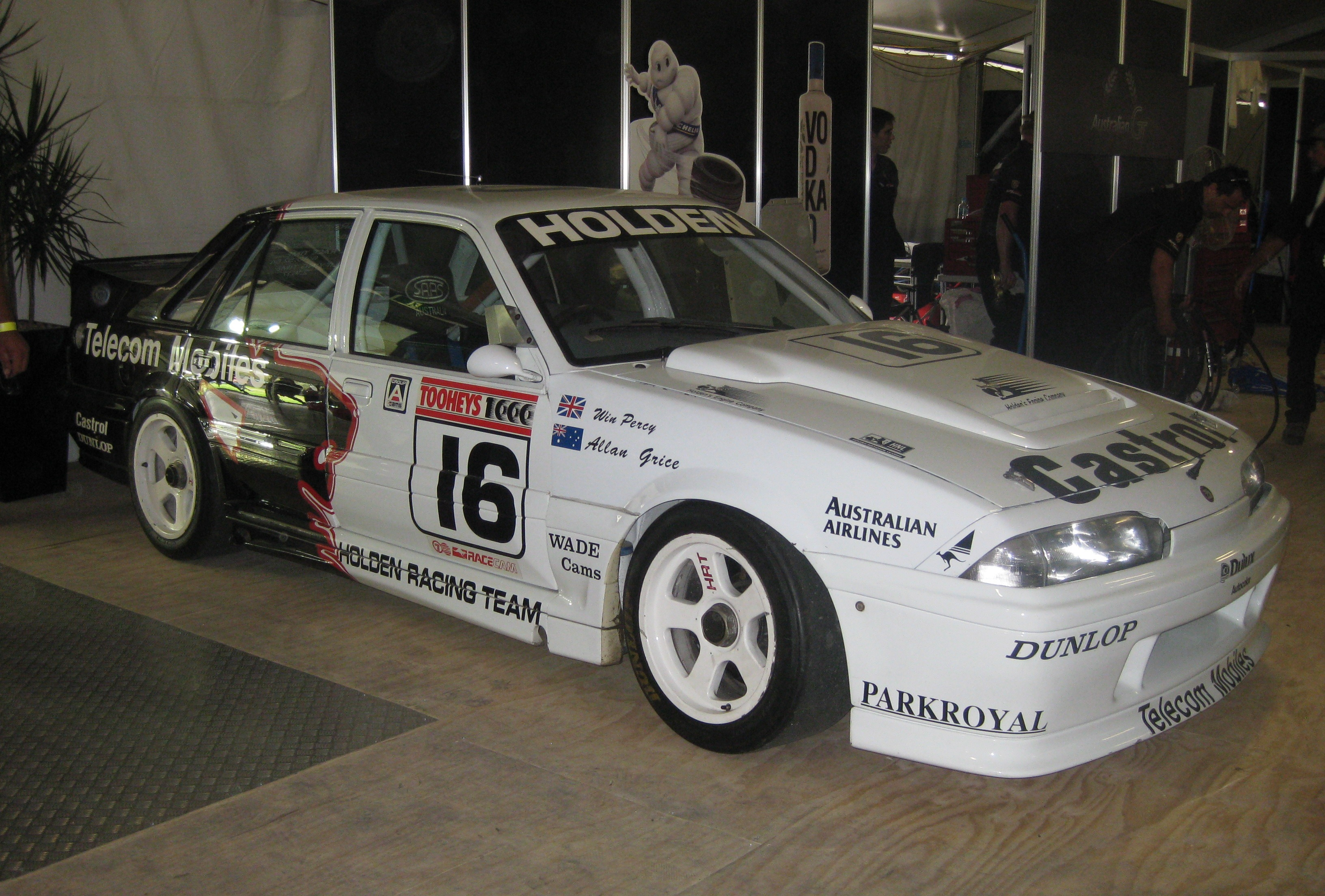
Win Percy & Allan Grice won the Bathurst round of the championship in a Holden VL Commodore SS Group A SV

The following drivers and teams competed in the 1990 Australian Endurance Championship. The series consisted of three rounds with one race per round.

| Team | Manufacturer | Car model | No | Driver |
|---|---|---|---|---|
| Nissan Motorsport Australia | Nissan | Skyline R32 GT-R | 1 | (New Zealand) Jim Richards (Australia) Mark Skaife |
| Alf Grant Racing | Nissan | Skyline HR31 GTS-R | 2 | (Australia) Alf Grant (Australia) Tim Grant |
| Search for a Champion | Holden | Commodore VL SS Group A SV | 3 | (Australia) Rick Bates (Australia) Peter Gazzard |
| Lansvale Racing Team | Holden | Commodore VL SS Group A SV | 4 | (Australia) Trevor Ashby (Australia) Steve Reed |
| Mobil 1 Racing | Ford | Sierra RS500 | 05 | (Australia) Peter Brock (Australia) David Parsons (Australia) Andrew Miedecke (United Kingdom) Andy Rouse |
| Mobil 1 Racing | Ford | Sierra RS500 | 6 | (Australia) Peter Brock (Australia) Charlie O'Brien (Australia) Andrew Miedecke (Australia) David Parsons |
| Holden Racing Team | Holden | Commodore VL SS Group A SV | 7 | (Australia) Brad Jones (Australia) Neil Crompton |
| Holden Racing Team | Holden | Commodore VL SS Group A SV | 16 | (United Kingdom) Win Percy (Australia) Allan Grice (Australia) Neil Crompton |
| Caltex CXT Racing | Ford | Sierra RS500 | 8 | (Australia) Colin Bond (New Zealand) Graeme Crosby |
| Caltex CXT Racing | Ford | Sierra RS500 | 19 | (Australia) Ken Mathews (Australia) John Mathews |
| Allan Moffat Enterprises | Ford | Sierra RS500 | 9 | (West Germany) Klaus Niedzwiedz (Australia) Gregg Hansford (Belgium) Pierre Dieudonné |
| Allan Moffat Enterprises | Ford | Sierra RS500 | 10 | (West Germany) Klaus Niedzwiedz (West Germany) Frank Biela (Belgium) Pierre Dieudonné |
| Perkins Engineering | Holden | Commodore VL SS Group A SV | 11 | (Australia) Larry Perkins (Australia) Tomas Mezera |
| John Holmes Motorsport | Ford | Sierra RS500 | 12 | (Australia) Ray Lintott (Australia) Garry Rush (Australia) Terry Shiel |
| Bob Forbes Racing | Holden | Commodore VL SS Group A SV | 13 | (Australia) Kevin Bartlett (Australia) Russell Ingall (Australia) Rohan Onslow |
| Bob Forbes Racing | Holden | Commodore VL SS Group A SV | 21 | (Australia) Mark Gibbs (Australia) Rohan Onslow |
| Murray Carter | Ford | Sierra RS500 | 14 | (Australia) Murray Carter (Australia) Matt Wacker |
| Toyota Team Australia | Toyota | Supra Turbo A | 15 | (Australia) John Smith (Australia) Drew Price (Australia) Peter McKay (Australia) Mark Poole |
| Toyota Team Australia | Toyota | Corolla FX-GT | 70 | (Australia) Peter McKay (Australia) Paul Stokell (New Zealand) John Faulkner (Australia) Mike Dowson |
| Toyota Team Australia | Toyota | Corolla FX-GT | 71 | (New Zealand) John Faulkner (Australia) Neal Bates (Australia) John Smith |
| Dick Johnson Racing | Ford | Sierra RS500 | 17 | (Australia) Dick Johnson (Australia) John Bowe |
| Dick Johnson Racing | Ford | Sierra RS500 | 18 | (United Kingdom) Jeff Allam (New Zealand) Paul Radisich (Australia) John Bowe |
| Bob Jones | Holden | Commodore VL SS Group A SV | 19 | (Australia) Bob Jones (New Zealand) Heather Spurle |
| Benson & Hedges Racing | Ford | Sierra RS500 | 20 | (Australia) Alan Jones (New Zealand) Denny Hulme (Australia) Gary Brabham (Australia) David Brabham |
| Benson & Hedges Racing | Ford | Sierra RS500 | 25 | (Australia) Tony Longhurst (Australia) Mark McLaughlin (Australia) Alan Jones |
| Lusty Engineering | Holden | Commodore VL SS Group A SV | 22 | (Australia) Graham Lusty (New Zealand) Peter Janson |
| Lusty Engineering | Holden | Commodore VL SS Group A SV | 42 | (Australia) John Lusty (Australia) Bernie Stack |
| Chris Lambden | Nissan | Skyline HR31 GTS-R | 23 | (United Kingdom) Chris Lambden (Australia) Greg Crick (Australia) Des Wall |
| Garry Rogers Motorsport | Holden | Commodore VL SS Group A SV | 26 | (Australia) Garry Rogers (Australia) Graham Moore (Australia) Paul Fordham |
| Terry Finnigan | Holden | Commodore VL SS Group A SV | 27 | (Australia) Terry Finnigan (Australia) Geoff Leeds |
| Playscape Racing | Ford | Sierra RS500 | 28 | (Australia) Kevin Waldock (Australia) Mike Preston (New Zealand) Andrew Bagnall |
| Playscape Racing | Ford | Sierra RS500 | 38 | (New Zealand) Andrew Bagnall (New Zealand) Robbie Francevic |
| Wayne Douglass Racing | Holden | Commodore VL SS Group A SV | 29 | (Australia) Wayne Park (Australia) John English |
| Glenn Seton Racing | Ford | Sierra RS500 | 30 | (Australia) George Fury (Australia) Drew Price (United Kingdom) David Sears |
| Glenn Seton Racing | Ford | Sierra RS500 | 35 | (Australia) Glenn Seton (Australia) George Fury (Australia) Drew Price (Australia) Colin Bond |
| Laurie Donaher | Holden | Commodore VL SS Group A | 32 | (Australia) Laurie Donaher (Australia) Mark Ducquet |
| Pro-Duct Motorsport | Holden | Commodore VL SS Group A SV | 33 | (Australia) Bob Pearson (Australia) Bruce Stewart |
| Ray Gulson | BMW | 635 CSi | 34 | (Australia) Ray Gulson (Australia) Graham Gulson |
| Ian Carrig | BMW | 635CSi | 36 | (Australia) Ian Clark (Australia) Ian Carrig (Australia) Peter Hudson |
| Brian Callaghan | Holden | Commodore VL SS Group A SV | 37 | (Australia) Brian Callaghan (Australia) Barry Graham |
| Brian Callaghan | Holden | Commodore VL SS Group A | 43 | (Australia) Brian Callaghan Jr (Australia) John Gerwald (Australia) Jason Bargwanna |
| Everlast Battery Services | Holden | Commodore VL SS Group A SV | 39 | (Australia) Bill O'Brien (Australia) Brian Sampson |
| Mark Petch Racing | Ford | Sierra RS500 | 40 | (Italy) Gianfranco Brancatelli (United Kingdom) Robb Gravett |
| Mulvihill Motorsport | Holden | Commodore VL SS Group A SV | 41 | (Australia) Tony Mulvihill (New Zealand) Glenn McIntyre (New Zealand) Dave Barrow |
| Paul Trevathan | Holden | Commodore VL SS Group A | 44 | (Australia) Paul Trevathan (Australia) Andrew McDowell |
| Lester Smerdon | Holden | Commodore VL SS Group A SV | 45 | (Australia) Lester Smerdon (Australia) Graham Jonsson |
| Garry Willmington Performance | Toyota | Supra Turbo | 46 | (Australia) Garry Willmington (Australia) Bryan Thomson (Australia) John Bourke |
| Phil Ward Racing | Mercedes-Benz | 190E | 51 | (Australia) Phil Ward (Australia) John Goss |
| M3 Motorsport | BMW | M3 | 52 | (Australia) Peter Doulman (Australia) John Cotter |
| Mike Twigden | BMW | 323i | 53 | (Australia) Mike Twigden (Australia) Brian Bolwell (Australia) David Pullen |
| Bryce Racing | BMW | M3 | 54 | (New Zealand) Brett Riley (New Zealand) Craig Baird |
| David Sala | Toyota | Corolla | 72 | (Australia) David Sala (Australia) Richard Vorst |
| Bob Holden Motors | Toyota | Sprinter AE86 | 73 | (Australia) Bob Holden (Australia) Mike Conway |
| Bob Holden Motors | Toyota | Corolla | 74 | (Australia) Phil Alexander (Australia) Keith McCulloch |
| Bob Holden Motors | Toyota | Corolla | 75 | (Australia) Dennis Rogers (West Germany) Llynden Reithmuller (Australia) Garry Rogers |
| Peter Verheyen | Toyota | Sprinter AE86 | 76 | (Australia) Peter Verheyen (Australia) Ron Searle (Australia) Russell Becker (Australia) John Vernon |
| Speedtech Motorsport | Toyota | Sprinter AE86 | 78 | (Australia) Geoff Full (Australia) David Ratcliff |
| Daryl Hendrick | Holden | Commodore VL SS Group A SV | 86 | (Australia) Daryl Hendrick (Australia) Joe Sommariva |

== Results and standings ==
=== Race calendar ===
The 1990 Australian Endurance Championship consisted of three rounds.

| Rd. | Race title | Circuit | City / state | Date | Winner(s) | Car | Team | Report |
|---|---|---|---|---|---|---|---|---|
| 1 | Sandown 500 | Sandown Raceway | Melbourne, Victoria | 9 September | (Australia) Glenn Seton (Australia) George Fury | Ford Sierra RS500 | Glenn Seton Racing | Report |
| 2 | Tooheys 1000 | Mount Panorama Circuit | Bathurst, New South Wales | 30 September | (United Kingdom) Win Percy (Australia) Allan Grice | Holden VL Commodore SS Group A SV | Holden Racing Team | Report |
| 3 | Nissan Sydney 500 | Eastern Creek Raceway | Sydney, New South Wales | 10 November | (Australia) Larry Perkins (Australia) Tomas Mezera | Holden VL Commodore SS Group A SV | Perkins Engineering | Report |

=== Drivers Championship ===
Points were awarded 20–15–12–10–8–6–4–3–2–1 based on the top ten race positions.

| Pos | Driver | Rd 1 | Rd 2 | Rd 3 | Pts |
|---|---|---|---|---|---|
| 1 | Glenn Seton | 1st | Ret | 2nd | 35 |
| 2 | Larry Perkins | Ret | 3rd | 1st | 32 |
| 2 | Tomas Mezera | Ret | 3rd | 1st | 32 |
| 2 | Peter Brock | 4th | 4th | 3rd | 32 |
| 5 | George Fury | 1st | Ret | 5th | 28 |
| 6 | Kevin Waldock | 3rd | 6th | 7th | 22 |
| 6 | Andrew Miedecke | 4th | 11th | 3rd | 22 |
| 8 | Win Percy | Ret | 1st | | 20 |
| 8 | Allan Grice | | 1st | | 20 |
| 10 | Mike Preston | 3rd | 6th | | 18 |
| 11 | Charlie O'Brien | 2nd | 11th | 10th | 16 |
| 11 | Drew Price | 5th | Ret | 5th | 16 |
| 13 | Jeff Allam | Ret | 2nd | | 15 |
| 13 | Paul Radisich | Ret | 2nd | | 15 |
| 13 | Colin Bond | | Ret | 2nd | 15 |
| 16 | David Parsons | 4th | 11th | 10th | 11 |
| 17 | Andy Rouse | | 4th | | 10 |
| 17 | Gary Brabham | | | 4th | 10 |
| 17 | David Brabham | | | 4th | 10 |
| 20 | John Smith | 5th | Ret | 19th | 8 |
| 20 | Neil Crompton | Ret | 5th | | 8 |
| 20 | Brad Jones | | 5th | | 8 |
| 20 | Andrew Bagnall | Ret | 7th | 7th | 8 |
| 24 | Garry Willington | 6th | 20th | Ret | 6 |
| 24 | Bryan Thomson | 6th | 20th | | 6 |
| 24 | Tony Longhurst | | Ret | 6th | 6 |
| 24 | Alan Jones | | Ret | 6th | 6 |
| 28 | Paul Trevathan | 7th | 23rd | | 4 |
| 28 | Andrew McDowell | 7th | 23rd | | 4 |
| 28 | Robbie Francevic | Ret | 7th | | 4 |
| 28 | Chris Lambden | 9th | 9th | Ret | 4 |
| 28 | Greg Crick | 9th | 9th | | 4 |
| 33 | Bob Pearson | | 15th | 8th | 3 |
| 33 | Bruce Stewart | | 15th | 8th | 3 |
| 33 | Geoff Full | 8th | 22nd | 21st | 3 |
| 33 | David Ratcliff | 8th | 22nd | 21st | 3 |
| 33 | Bill O'Brien | | 8th | | 3 |
| 33 | Brian Sampson | | 8th | | 3 |
| 39 | Trevor Ashby | | Ret | 9th | 2 |
| 39 | Steve Reed | | Ret | 9th | 2 |
| 41 | Bob Jones | 10th | 26th | | 1 |
| 41 | Heather Spurle | 10th | 26th | | 1 |
| 41 | Klaus Niedzwiedz | Ret | 10th | | 1 |
| 41 | Frank Biela | | 10th | | 1 |
| 41 | Pierre Dieudonné | | 10th | | 1 |
| Pos | Driver | Rd 1 | Rd 2 | Rd 3 | Pts |

| Colour | Result |
|---|---|
| Gold | Winner |
| Silver | Second place |
| Bronze | Third place |
| Green | Points classification |
| Blue | Non-points classification |
| Blue | Non-classified finish (NC) |
| Purple | Retired, not classified (Ret) |
| Red | Did not qualify (DNQ) |
| Red | Did not pre-qualify (DNPQ) |
| Black | Disqualified (DSQ) |
| White | Did not start (DNS) |
| White | Withdrew (WD) |
| White | Race cancelled (C) |
| Blank | Did not practice (DNP) |
| Blank | Did not arrive (DNA) |
| Blank | Excluded (EX) |
