= 1986 Castrol 500 =

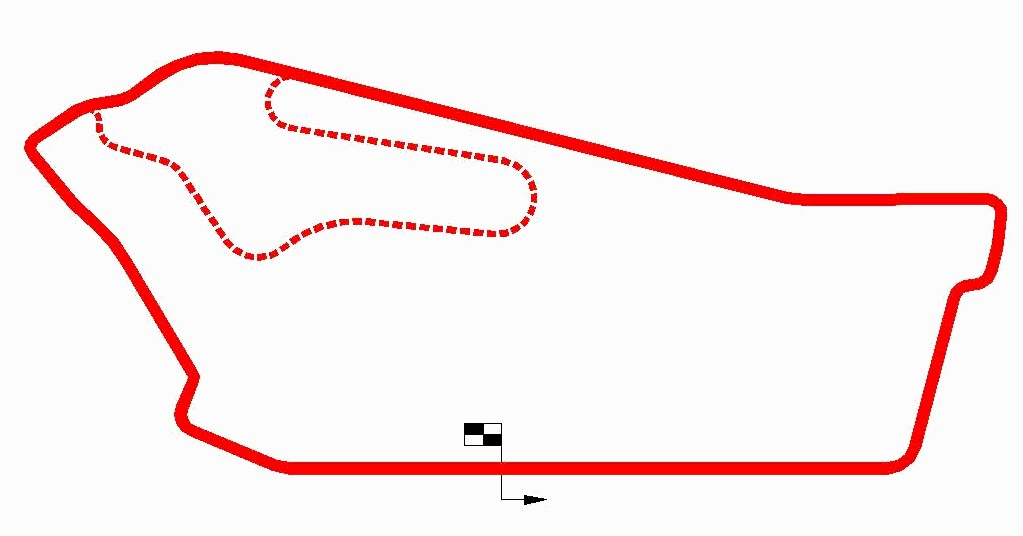
Layout of the Sandown Raceway international circuit (1984-1998)

The 1986 Castrol 500 was an endurance race for cars complying with CAMS Touring Car regulations, which were based on FIA Group A rules. The event was staged on 14 September 1986 over 129 laps of the 3.9 km Sandown International Motor Racing Circuit in Victoria, Australia, a total distance of 503 km. The race, which was Round 3 of both the 1986 Australian Endurance Championship and the 1986 Australian Manufacturers' Championship, was the 21st "Sandown 500" endurance race.

Cars competed in three engine displacement classes:

- Class A: Up to 2000ccc
- Class B: 2001 to 3000cc
- Class C: 3001 to 6000cc

The race was won by the Nissan Australia Nissan Skyline turbo of George Fury and Glenn Seton from their teammates Gary Scott and Terry Sheil, with the V8 Holden Commodore of Allan Grice and Graeme Bailey finishing third. 1986 was the first time a turbo powered car had won the Sandown enduro, and the first of six consecutive Sandown 500's won by turbo power.

Peter Brock and Allan Moffat, who between them had won 14 of the previous 17 Sandown enduros dating back to Moffat's first win in 1969, finished 4th in their Holden Dealer Team Commodore. Brock had won pole for the race in Saturday's "Castrol Chargers" top ten runoff with a time of 1:49.84. Defending race winners Jim Richards and Tony Longhurst finished two laps down in 5th place in their JPS Team BMW 635 CSi.

Robbie Francevic, the 1986 Australian Touring Car Champion, failed to start the race after his car was withdrawn on race morning following his comments that the Volvo 240T he was to drive wouldn't be competitive as the Volvo Dealer Team had not been able to practice due to the team still building the car. Francevic's public comments saw him dismissed from the team by team manager John Shepherd the day after the race.

The Holden Commodore of Allan Grice and Graeme Bailey won Class C (3001 to 6000cc), the Nissan Skyline of George Fury and Glenn Seton won Class B (2001 to 3000cc) and the Toyota Corolla of Mike Quinn and John Faulkner placed first in Class A (Up to 2000cc).

The 1986 Castrol 500 saw the touring car racing debut of 19 year old Mark Skaife. Co-driving with Peter Williamson in his Toyota Celica Supra, the pair finished 10th outright.

== Results ==
As sourced:

=== Castrol Chargers ===
A "Castrol Chargers" session, contested for the first time in 1986, involved the top ten cars from qualifying undertaking two single-lap runs to determine the final grid order for the race.

Pos	No	Entrant	Driver	Car	Time	Qual
1	05	HDT Racing Pty Ltd	(Australia) Peter Brock	Holden VK Commodore SS Group A	1:49.84	1:51.0
2	30	Peter Jackson Nissan Racing	(Australia) George Fury	Nissan Skyline DR30 RS	1:50.22	1:50.1
3	15	Peter Jackson Nissan Racing	(Australia) Gary Scott	Nissan Skyline DR30 RS	1:50.33	1:50.3
4	2	Valley View Poultry Pty Ltd	(Australia) Allan Grice	Holden VK Commodore SS Group A	1:50.66	?
5	3	HDT Racing Pty Ltd	(Australia) John Harvey	Holden VK Commodore SS Group A	1:51.26	?
6	6	Bob Jane T-Marts	(New Zealand) Graeme Crosby	Holden VK Commodore SS Group A	1:51.47	?
7	1	JPS Team BMW	(New Zealand) Jim Richards	BMW 635 CSi	1:51.49	1:51.9
8	17	Palmer Tube Mills	(Australia) Dick Johnson	Ford Mustang GT	1:51.95	1:51.9
9	4	Autoport Centre	(Australia) Peter McLeod	Holden VK Commodore SS Group A	1:53.05	1:53.3
10	36	Everlast Battery Service	(Australia) Murray Carter	Nissan Skyline DR30 RS	1:53.85	1:53.1

=== Race ===
Position	Class	No.	Entrant	Drivers	Car	Laps
1	B	30	Peter Jackson Nissan Racing	(Australia) George Fury (Australia) Glenn Seton	Nissan Skyline DR30 RS	129
2	B	15	Peter Jackson Nissan Racing	(Australia) Gary Scott (Australia) Terry Shiel	Nissan Skyline DR30 RS	128
3	C	2	Valley View Poultry Pty Ltd	(Australia) Allan Grice (Australia) Graeme Bailey	Holden VK Commodore SS Group A	128
4	C	05	HDT Racing Pty Ltd	(Australia) Peter Brock (Canada) Allan Moffat	Holden VK Commodore SS Group A	128
5	C	1	JPS Team BMW	(New Zealand) Jim Richards (Australia) Tony Longhurst	BMW 635 CSi	127
6	C	6	Bob Jane T-Marts	(New Zealand) Graeme Crosby (New Zealand) Wayne Wilkinson	Holden VK Commodore SS Group A	127
7	B	36	Everlast Battery Service	(Australia) Murray Carter (Australia) Bill O'Brien	Nissan Skyline DR30 RS	125
8	C	3	HDT Racing Pty Ltd	(Australia) John Harvey (New Zealand) Neal Lowe	Holden VK Commodore SS Group A	125
9	C	33	Mike Burgmann	(Australia) Mike Burgmann (Australia) Mal Rose	Holden VK Commodore SS Group A	125
10	B	77	Peter Williamson Toyota	(Australia) Peter Williamson (Australia) Mark Skaife	Toyota Celica Supra	125
11	C	7	Goold Motorsport	(Australia) Charlie O'Brien (Australia) Garry Rogers	BMW 635 CSi	125
12	C	38	Grellis Marketing	(Australia) Ray Ellis (Australia) Kerry Baily	Holden VK Commodore SS Group A	125
13	C	19	Tony Mulvihill	(Australia) Tony Mulvihill (Australia) Ken Matthews	Holden VK Commodore SS Group A	123
14	C	11	Enzed Team Perkins	(Australia) Larry Perkins (Australia) David Parsons	Holden VK Commodore SS Group A	122
15	B	75	Network Alfa	(Australia) Colin Bond (Australia) Peter Fitzgerald	Alfa Romeo GTV6	120
16	B	87	Brian Bolwell	(Australia) Brian Bolwell (Australia) Tony Farrell	BMW 323i	119
17	A	61	Toyota Team Australia	(Australia) Mike Quinn (New Zealand) John Faulkner	Toyota Corolla	119
18	A	60	Giddings Moss Vale	(Australia) John Giddings (Australia) Bruce Stewart	Nissan Silvia RS	118
19	A	42	David Morton	(Australia) David Morton (Australia) Chris Clearihan	Toyota Corolla	115
20	A	62	Bob Holden Motors	(Australia) Keith McClelland (Australia) Brian Nightingale	Toyota Sprinter	115
21	C	91	Graham Lorimer	(New Zealand) Graham Lorimer (New Zealand) Phil Myhre	BMW 635 CSi	114
22	C	4	Autoport Centre	(Australia) Peter McLeod (New Zealand) Glenn Clark	Holden VK Commodore SS Group A	108
23	A	13	Bob Holden Motors	(Australia) Bob Holden (Australia) Ray Cutchie	Toyota Sprinter	108
24	C	28	Capri Components	(Australia) Lawrie Nelson (Australia) Brian Sampson	Ford Mustang GT	108
25	C	20	Jim Keogh	(Australia) Jim Keogh (Australia) Des Wall	BMW 635 CSi	106
26	A	88	John White	(Australia) John White; Les Szreniawski	Isuzu Gemini ZZ (PF60E)	106
27	B	76	Hulcraft Automotive	Rex Muldoon (Australia) David Sala	Ford Capri 3000S	92
28	A	57	Mike Freeman	(Australia) Mike Freeman (Australia) Bruce Williams	Toyota Celica	84
DNF	C	8	Cullen Supa Salvage	(Australia) Warren Cullen (Australia) Gary Sprague	Holden VK Commodore SS Group A	113
DNF	B	44	Volvo Dealer Team	(Australia) John Bowe (Australia) Alfredo Costanzo	Volvo 240T	112
DNF	C	23	Lusty Engineering Pty Ltd	(Australia) Graham Lusty (Australia) Ken Lusty	Holden VK Commodore SS Group A	68
DNF	C	9	JPS Team BMW	(Australia) Kevin Bartlett (New Zealand) Trevor Crowe	BMW 635 CSi	57
DNF	A	16	Toyota Team Australia	(Australia) Drew Price (Australia) John Smith	Toyota Corolla	48
DNF	A	86	Gem Spares	(Australia) Daryl Hendrick; Thomas Crozier	Isuzu Gemini	45
DNF	C	24	Jagparts	(Australia) Gerald Kay (Australia) Bryan Thomson	Holden VK Commodore SS Group A	18
DNF	C	17	Palmer Tube Mills	(Australia) Dick Johnson (Australia) Gregg Hansford	Ford Mustang GT	16
DNF	B	99	Hulcraft Automotive	(Australia) Denis Horley (Australia) Craig Harris	Ford Capri 3000S	14
DNF	A	58	Ratcliff Transport Spares	(Australia) David Ratcliff (Australia) Don Smith	Toyota Corolla Levin	5
DNF	B	49	Alfa City Pty Ltd	(Australia) Ray Gulson (Australia) Frank Porter	Alfa Romeo GTV6	0
DNS	B	42	Volvo Dealer Team	(New Zealand) Robbie Francevic (New Zealand) Graham McRae	Volvo 240T	-
DNS	C	12	Gary Willmington	(Australia) Gary Willmington (New Zealand) John Clinton	Jaguar XJ-S	-

== Statistics ==
- Pole Position - #05 Peter Brock - Holden VK Commodore SS Group A - 1:49.84
- Fastest Lap - #2 Allan Grice - Holden VK Commodore SS Group A - 1:52.10 (Touring Car Lap Record)

== See also ==
1986 Australian Touring Car season

Preceded by 1985 Castrol 500	Sandown 500; 1986	Succeeded by 1987 Castrol 500
