= Andrew McDowell =

Irish economist and government official

Vice President of the European Investment Bank
- In office 1 September 2016 – 1 September 2020
- President: Werner Hoyer

Personal details
- Born: January 1971 (age 54)
- Political party: Fine Gael
- Education: University College Dublin (BComm, MSc, MBA)

Andrew McDowell (born January 1971) is an Irish economist and government official. He was economic advisor to Taoiseach Enda Kenny from 2011, until he became a vice-president of the European Investment Bank between 2016 and 2020.

== Background ==
McDowell was born in 1971. He attended St Conleth's College. He studied at University College Dublin, receiving a BComm, MSc and MBA. He completed a post-graduate fellowship in economics and European studies at the Paul H. Nitze School of Advanced International Studies of Johns Hopkins University.

He began his career as an accountant. McDowell then worked as European deputy editor of the Economist Intelligence Unit and was later chief economist at Forfás.

== Public career ==
=== Economic Advisor ===
He began working for Fine Gael as an economic advisor in 2007. He became the party's head of research in 2009. He was the author of many of the party's economic policies, including the proposal to establish Irish Water.

He was a participant in negotiations between Fine Gael and the Labour Party which led to both parties going into government together. Following the formation of the government, he was appointed as one of Enda Kenny's two main advisors, his chief economic advisor. His salary was criticised by the Leader of the Opposition, Micheál Martin.

He was a member of the Economic Management Council, a cabinet sub-committee which took decisions related to the Irish economic crisis. Midway through the coalition, he was the lead negotiator with the Labour Party on policy priorities.

He was credited with creating the slogan "keep the recovery going" used by Fine Gael in the 2016 Irish general election. He was again involved in Fine Gael negotiations following the election. He negotiated with Fianna Fáil to establish a confidence and supply agreement which led to Fine Gael returning to government.

=== European Investment Bank ===
Ireland was allocated one of eight vice president positions at the European Investment Bank in 2016. The Irish government undertook a public competition and put forward McDowell as its nominee. He took up his position on 1 September 2016.

His role encompassed oversight of the bank's treasury, economics and evaluation functions and institutional relations in some European and Asian countries. He oversaw lending operations and policy in the energy sector.

McDowell was considered for the role of Governor of the Central Bank of Ireland in 2019.

His four-year term came to an end on 1 September 2020. He was succeeded by Christian Kettel Thomsen.

=== Commissioner nominee ===
McDowell was one of two people, along with Mairead McGuinness, nominated by the Irish government on 4 September 2020 to replace Phil Hogan on the European Commission. Ursula von der Leyen interviewed McDowell and McGuinness, before selecting McGuinness for her College of Commissioners on 8 September 2020.

== Personal life ==
McDowell is married with children. His second cousin is the former Tánaiste Michael McDowell.
