= Ford Sierra RS Cosworth =

High performance version of a Ford medium sized road car

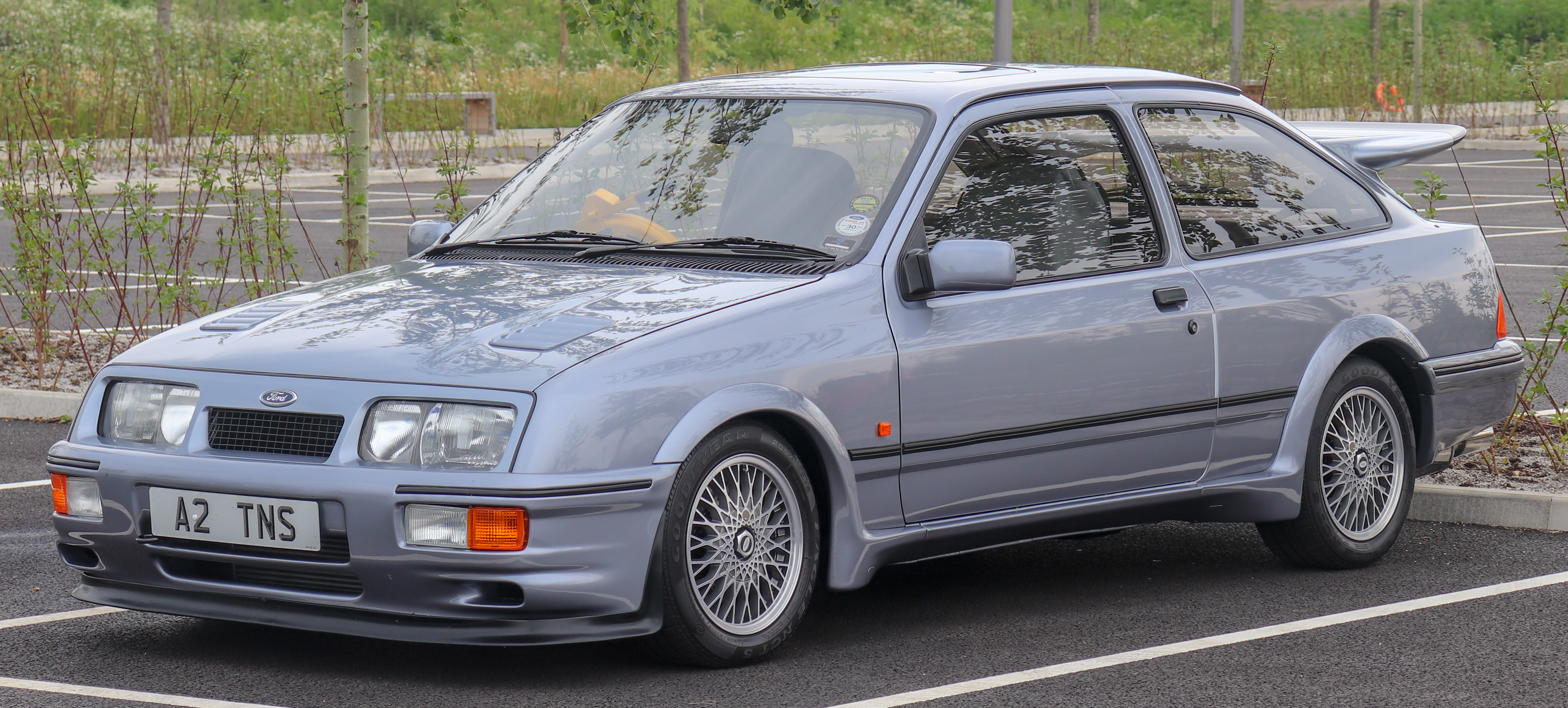
- 1986 Ford Sierra RS Cosworth

Overview
- Manufacturer: Ford Europe
- Production: 1986–1992
- Assembly: Belgium: Genk (Genk Body & Assembly)
- Designer: Lothar Pinske

Body and chassis
- Body style: 3-door hatchback (1986–1987); 4-door saloon (1988–1992)
- Layout: Front-engine, rear-wheel drive (1986–1989); Front-engine, all-wheel drive (1990–1992)

Powertrain
- Engine: 2.0 L Cosworth YBD/YBG/YBJ turbocharged I4
- Transmission: 5-speed manual; Borg Warner T5 (1986–1989); Ferguson 4x4 MT75 (1990–1992)

Dimensions
- Length: 446 cm (175.6 in) (1986–1987); 449 cm (176.8 in) (1988–1992)
- Width: 173 cm (68.1 in) (1986–1987); 170 cm (66.9 in) (1988–1992)
- Height: 138 cm (54.3 in) (1986–1992)
- Curb weight: 1,217 kg (2,683 lb) (1986–1987); 1,206 kg (2,659 lb) (1988–1989); 1,305 kg (2,877 lb) (1990–1992)

Chronology
- Predecessor: Ford RS200
- Successor: Ford Escort RS Cosworth

The Ford Sierra RS Cosworth is a high-performance version of the Ford Sierra that was built by Ford Europe from 1986 to 1992. It was the result of a Ford Motorsport project aimed at producing an outright winner for Group A racing in Europe.

== Development ==
The project was defined by Stuart Turner in the spring of 1983. He had recently been appointed head of Ford Motorsport in Europe, and realised that Ford was no longer competitive in this area.

Turner got in touch with Walter Hayes, at the time the vice-president of public relations at Ford, to get support for the project. Hayes had earlier been the driving force behind the development of the Ford GT40 that won Le Mans in 1966, and the Cosworth DFV engine that brought Ford 154 victories and 12 world championships in Formula One during the 1960s and 1970s. Hayes found the project very appealing and promised his full support.

Turner then invited Ken Kohrs, vice-president of development, to visit Ford's longtime partner, the automotive engineering company Cosworth, where they were presented a project developed on Cosworth's own initiative, the YAA engine. This was a twin cam, 16-valve engine based on Ford's existing T88 engine block, better known as the Pinto. This prototype proved an almost ideal basis for the engine Turner needed to power his Group A winner.

Subsequently, an official request for a turbocharged version (designated Cosworth YBB) capable of 180 HP on the street and 300 HP in race trim, was placed. Cosworth answered positively, subject to two conditions: the engine would produce not less than 150 kW (201 hp) in the street version, and Ford had to accept no fewer than 15,000 engines. Turner's project would only need about 5,000 engines, but Ford nevertheless accepted the conditions. The extra 10,000 engines would later become one of the reasons Ford also chose to develop a four-door, second generation, Sierra RS Cosworth.

Finding a suitable gearbox proved challenging. The Borg-Warner T5, also used in the Ford Mustang, was chosen, but the higher revving nature of the Sierra caused some problems. Eventually Borg-Warner had to set up a dedicated production line for the gearboxes to be used in the Sierra RS Cosworth.

Many of the suspension differences between the standard Sierra and the Cosworth could be traced back to what was learned from racing the turbocharged Jack Roush IMSA Merkur XR4Ti in America and Andy Rouse's successful campaign in the 1985 British Saloon Car Championship. Much of Ford's external documentation for customer race preparation indicated "developed for the XR4Ti" when describing parts that were Sierra Cosworth specific. Roush's suspension and aerodynamics engineering for the IMSA cars was excellent feedback for Ford. Some production parts from the XR4Ti made their way into the Cosworth, such as the speedometer with integral boost gauge and the motorsport 909 chassis stiffening plates.

In April 1983, Turner's team decided on the Sierra as a basis for their project. The Sierra filled the requirements for rear wheel drive and decent aerodynamic drag. A racing version could also help to improve the poor, and somewhat undeserved, reputation that the Sierra had earned since its introduction in 1982.

Lothar Pinske, responsible for the car's bodywork, demanded carte blanche when it came to appearance in order to make the car stable at high speed. Experience had shown that the Sierra hatchback body generated significant aerodynamic lift even at relatively moderate speed.

After extensive wind tunnel testing and test runs at the Nardò circuit in Italy, a prototype was presented to the project management. This was based on an XR4i body with provisional body modifications in fibreglass and aluminium. The car's appearance raised little enthusiasm. The large rear wing caused particular reluctance. Pinske insisted, however, that the modifications were necessary to make the project successful. The rear wing was essential to retain ground contact at 300 km/h, the opening between the headlights was needed to feed air to the intercooler and the wheel arch extensions had to be there to house wheels 10” wide on the racing version. Eventually, the Ford designers agreed to try to make a production version based on the prototype.

In 1984, Walter Hayes paid visits to many European Ford dealers in order to survey the sales potential for the Sierra RS Cosworth. A requirement for participation in Group A was that 5,000 cars were built and sold. The feedback was not encouraging. The dealers estimated they could sell 1,500 cars.

Hayes did not give up, however, and continued his passionate internal marketing of the project. As prototypes started to emerge, dealers were invited to test-drive sessions, and this increased the enthusiasm for the new car. In addition, Ford took some radical measures to reduce the price on the car. As an example, the car was only offered in three exterior colours (black, white and moonstone blue) and one interior colour (grey). There were also just two equipment options: with or without central locking and electric window lifts. European models differed from UK models in their specification with a basic radio cassette and no amplifier being fitted rather than the Ford Sound 2000 head unit and amplifier.

== Production ==
The Ford Sierra RS Cosworth was first presented to the public at the Geneva Motor Show in March 1985, with plans to release it for sale in September and closing production of the 5,000 cars in the summer of 1986.

In practice, it was launched in July 1986, and 5545 were manufactured in total, of which 500 were sent to Tickford for conversion to the Sierra three-door RS500 Cosworth. The vehicles were manufactured at Ford's Genk factory in Belgium in both Left and Right hand drive, with the Pre Production Prove out Process cars produced in February 1986 and the main production of the vehicle commencing summer 1986, the final cars off the production line were in December 1986. 3 colours were produced, Black, White and Moonstone Blue, with White and Moonstone Blue both seeing around 2/5th of the total number of Right Hand Drive models produced with Black cars around 1/5th. The following number of vehicles were registered in the UK:

| Calendar Year | Production |
|---|---|
| 1985 | 10 |
| 1986 | 1,064 |
| 1987 | 579 |
| Total | 1,653 |

As published in the 1986 RS catalog:

- Max speed: 149 mph (240 km/h)
- 0–60 mph (0–97 km/h): 6.5 sec
- Fuel consumption at 56 mph (90 km/h): 38.2 mpg_{‑imp} (31.8 mpg_{‑US}; 7.4 l/100 km)
- Fuel consumption at 75 mph (121 km/h): 30.1 mpg_{‑imp} (25.1 mpg_{‑US}; 9.4 l/100 km)
- Drag coefficient ($\scriptstyle C_\mathrm d\,$): 0.345
- Rear spoiler: 20kgf at 150 mph (241 km/h)
- Front brakes: Disc 28.3 cm (11.1 in) diameter
- Rear brakes: Disc 27.3 cm (10.7 in) diameter
- Differential: Viscous coupled limited slip
- Tyre size: 205/50 VRx15
- Wheels: 15"×7" alloys

== Sierra RS500 Cosworth ==
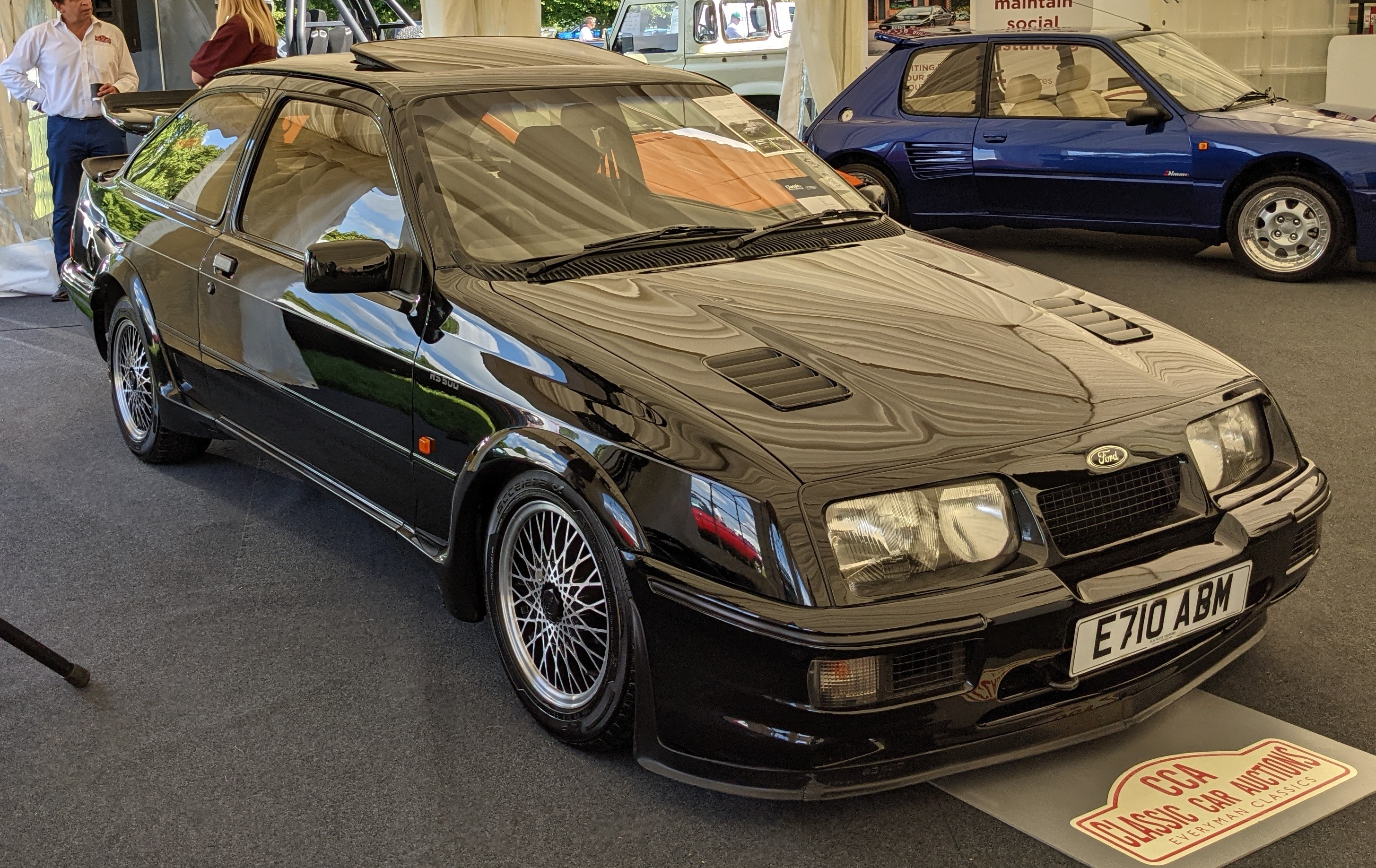
Ford Sierra RS500 Cosworth

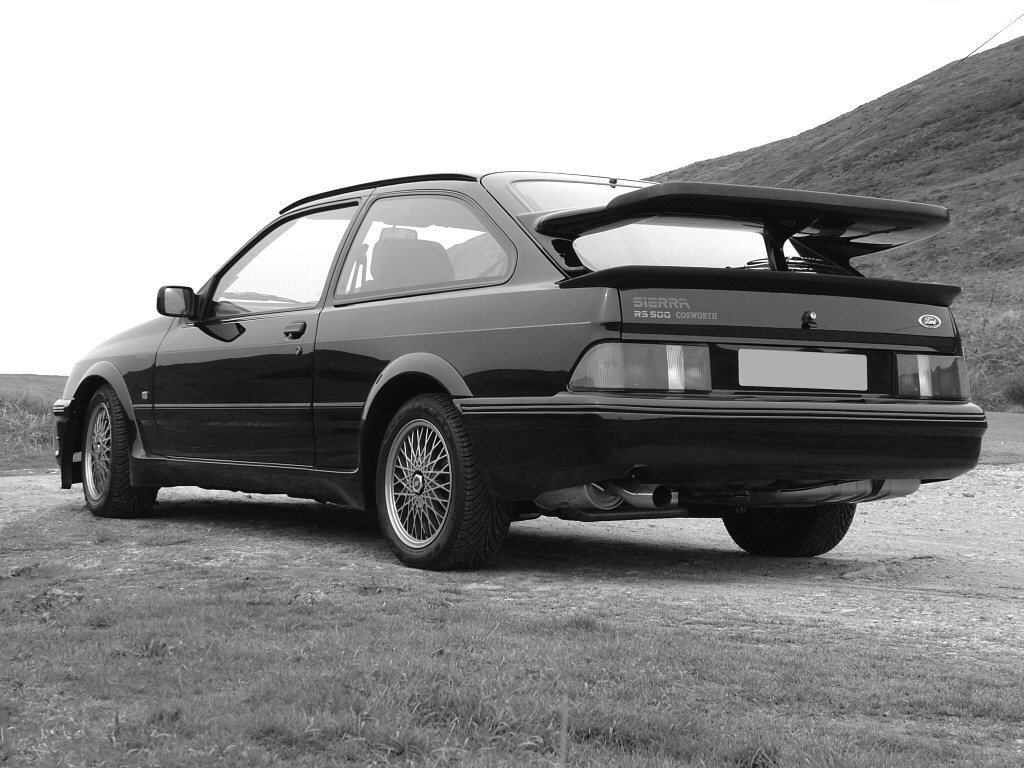
Ford Sierra RS500 Cosworth

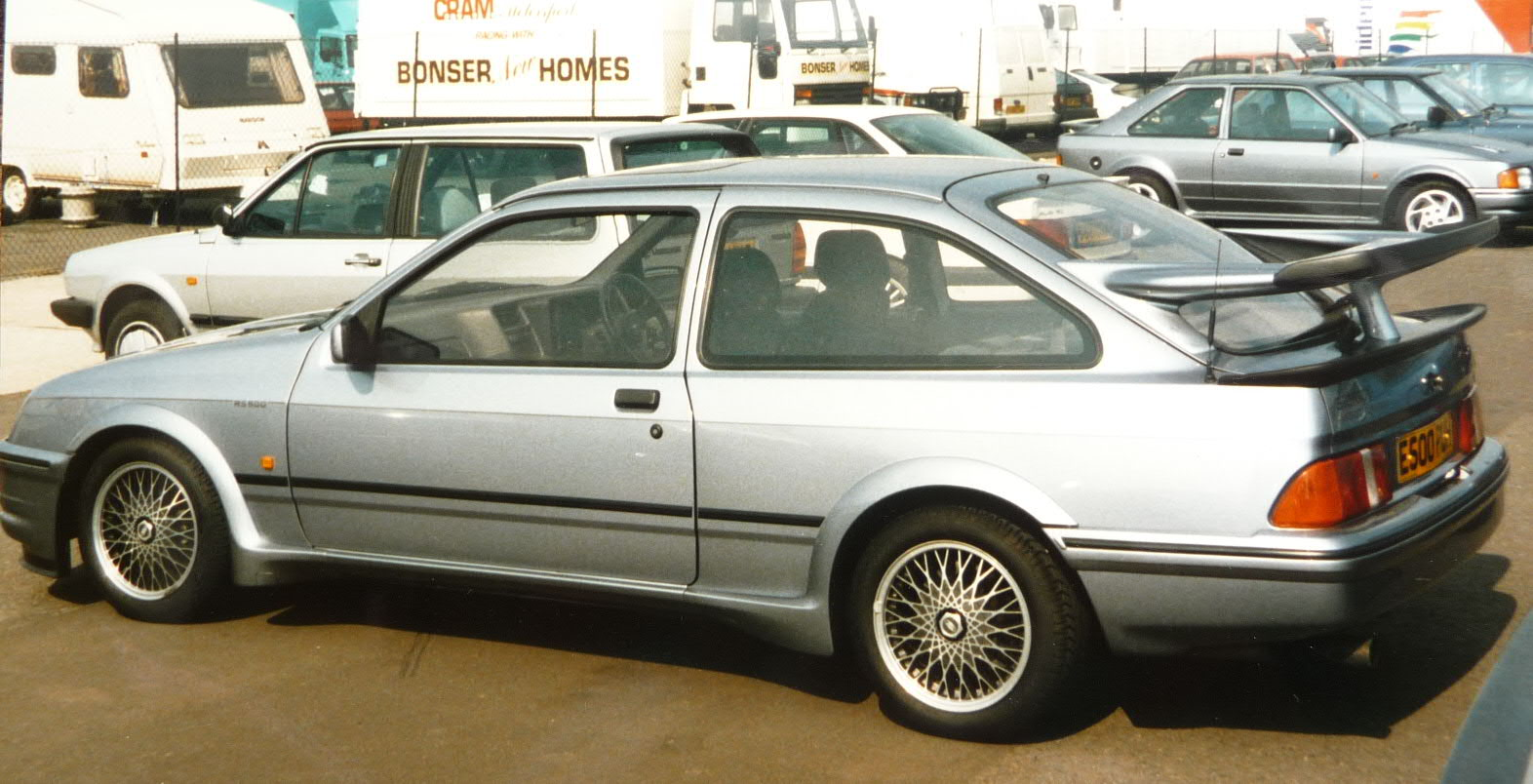
Ford Sierra RS500 Cosworth with British registration plate starting E500 P... at Donington Park in 1988

Mike Moreton was head of the team that planned to develop an evolution edition aimed at making the car unbeatable on the race tracks. In March 1987, Aston Martin Tickford was signed for the job of converting the 500 cars.

The Cosworth RS500 was announced in July 1987, and was homologated in August 1987.

The main difference to the Sierra three-door Cosworth was Cosworth's uprated competition engine. Its new features were:

- The cylinder block has thicker walls and smaller core plugs
- A larger Garrett AiResearch T04 turbocharger
- A larger air-air intercooler
- A second set of four Weber IW025 "yellow" fuel injectors and a second fuel rail (not functional in the road version)
- An uprated fuel pump
- A larger capacity airbox and turbo inlet pipe
- Blow-off valve crossover pipe feed relocated to the inlet manifold
- An uprated oil and cooling system
- The rear semi-trailing arm beam had extended but unused mounting points
- Engine output increased to 227 PS (224 hp; 167 kW) at 6000 rpm
- Max. torque of 277 N⋅m (204 lb⋅ft) at 4500 rpm.

The RS500 also had minor external cosmetic differences to its parent the Sierra three-door Cosworth:

- The rear tailgate had a lower spoiler in addition to the upper "whale tail"
- The upper "whale tail" had the standard car's trailing edge replaced with a more aggressive "gurney flap" for additional downforce
- Discreet RS500 badges on the rear tailgate and front wings
- A redesigned front bumper and spoiler to aid cooling and air flow, including the removal of the fog lamps and their replacement with intake grilles to supplement brake cooling

Exactly 500 RS500s were produced using the 500 Sierra RS Cosworth vehicles that were produced at Genk in December 1986, all of them RHD for sale in the UK only - the biggest market for this kind of Ford car. It was originally intended that all 500 would be black, however 56 white and 52 moonstone blue cars were also produced.

Some European tuners, missing a LHD RS500 version, have set up some elaborate versions of the Sierra RS Cosworth for private customers, replicating some of the RS500's specs. A tuning business with experience of this model is Wolf Racing, which was racing with the Sierra from 1986 to 1989 in the German touring car championship Deutsche Tourenwagen Meisterschaft.

The official tuning kit for the engine included:

- Racing pistons
- Green injectors
- Bigger petrol pump
- Racing wastegate
- Electronic control chip
- Steel exhaust

Concerning the aesthetics:

- Lowered sport suspensions
- 16" wheels with gold alloys (BTCC racing version)
- RS500 original aero kit
- RS500 decals
- Tinting films on rear windows
- RS500 instrumentation with 300 km/h full-scale speedometer
- Additional instrumentation integrated in the central console
- Racing gear knob
- Sport pedals

The declared power was 260 PS (191 kW), although some owners claim at least 40 PS (29 kW) more.

== Motorsport achievements ==
=== Touring car racing ===
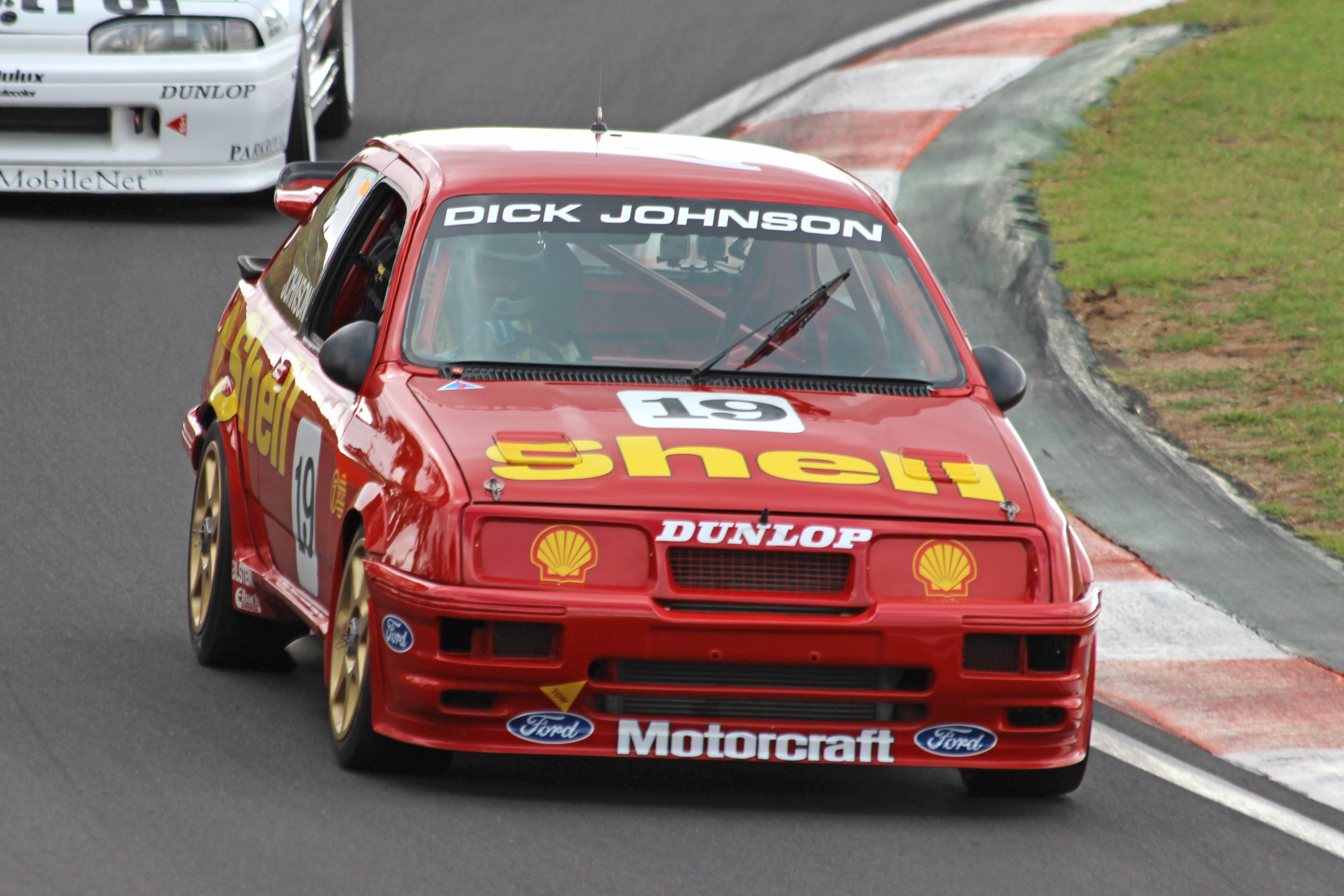
A Dick Johnson Racing-built Sierra RS500 touring car.

In August 1987 the Sierra RS500 Cosworth was homologated. Ford took pole position in all the remaining six 1987 World Touring Car Championship events and was first over the finish line in four of them. The works Eggenberger Motorsport team won the entrants' World Championship, although the team's cars were disqualified from the 1987 Bathurst 1000 in Australia for wheel arch panel irregularities. These had been deemed legal in every other race that year however this deprived Klaus Ludwig and Klaus Niedzwiedz of the drivers' title. Eggenberger won the 1989 Spa 24 Hours.

Robb Gravett won the 1990 British Touring Car Championship in a RS500. The BTCC points system was such that divisions below the Sierra (3500cc & under, 2000cc & under) would gain more points for a class win therefore although the Sierra finished first in 9/12 rounds of the 1987 season and first in every race from 1988 to 1990 it only took the drivers title once in 1990.

The RS500 was successful in the 1988 DTM with Klaus Ludwig in the Ford Team Grab winning the drivers championship and Wolf Racing winning the Team Championship. Both Grab and Wolf were Ford Works Teams and beat Mercedes-AMG along with BMW M Sport for the honours. For the 1989 season, the cars were reined in with even higher weight and boost penalties (partly due to protests from BMW and Mercedes who felt they were at a significant disadvantage) until they were no longer competitive, subsequently forced induction engines were banned for 1991 season onwards. Knowing they were unable to be competitive, Ford left the DTM at end of the 1989 season.

The RS500 was successful in Australian touring car racing with Dick Johnson Racing dominating the 1988 and 1989 Australian Touring Car Championships, with Dick Johnson and John Bowe finishing one-two in both years. Early in 1988, the Johnson team also took the step of homologating a modified Ford nine-inch axle for the Sierra, eliminating the car's drivetrain weakness and allowing the cars to be driven harder with less fear of failure. This was also seen as essential in Australia which used standing starts compared to the rolling starts used in Europe.

Glenn Seton won the 1990 Australian Endurance Championship driving a Sierra RS500.

The RS500 won the Bathurst 1000 twice; in 1988 with Tony Longhurst and Tomas Mezera and in 1989 with Johnson and Bowe. It also won the 1988 Sandown 500 with Allan Moffat and Gregg Hansford and the 1990 Sandown 500 with Glenn Seton and George Fury. Robbie Francevic won the New Zealand Touring Car Championship in 1989 and 1990 for Mark Petch Motorsport. The RS500 also won 3 out 4 rounds of the 1988 Asia-Pacific Touring Car Championship, however due to Division 2 vehicles (2000cc-3500cc) gaining more points for outright places, it did not take the title with Colin Bond taking second place.

The RS500 won the Japanese Touring Car Championship in 1987, 1988 & 1989 with team Object T. Ballast. Boost restrictions were increased for the 1989 season, resulting in hampered performance. With only two wins, it did not win the drivers title but did retain the manufacturers title.

=== Major wins ===
Major series and race wins by the Ford Sierra RS500 include:

==== Series wins ====
- World Touring Car Championship - 1987 (entrants' title)
- European Touring Car Championship - 1988 (entrants' title)
- Australian Touring Car Championship - 1988, 1989
- Deutsche Tourenwagen Meisterschaft - 1988
- Japanese Touring Car Championship - 1987, 1988, (1989 entrants' title)
- AMSCAR series - 1988, 1989, 1990
- Nissan Mobil 500 Series - 1989, 1990
- New Zealand Touring Car Championship - 1989, 1990, 1992
- British Touring Car Championship - 1990
- Australian Endurance Championship - 1990

==== Race wins ====
- Wellington 500 - 1987
- Fuji InterTEC 500 - 1987, 1988, 1989
- Nürburgring 24 Hours - 1987
- RAC Tourist Trophy - 1988
- Sandown 500 - 1988, 1990
- Bathurst 1000 - 1988, 1989
- Pukekohe 500 - 1988, 1989, 1990
- Spa 24 Hours - 1989
- Guia Race of Macau - 1989

The RS500 can be seen as the catalyst for the downfall of the Group A format due to its dominance in every Group A sanctioned event from 1987 onwards. With the Ford Sierra due to be replaced with the all new Ford Mondeo for the 1993 model year, the BTCC, DTM and other championships moving away from the Group A format from 1990 onwards due to increasing costs, lack of manufacturer participation and the RS500 still winning over 3 years after it had been homologated, Ford saw no reason to produce another 'Evolution' model.

Motorsport Magazine stated the RS500 is statistically the most successful road derived racing car of all time, winning 84.6% of all races it entered.

=== Rallying ===
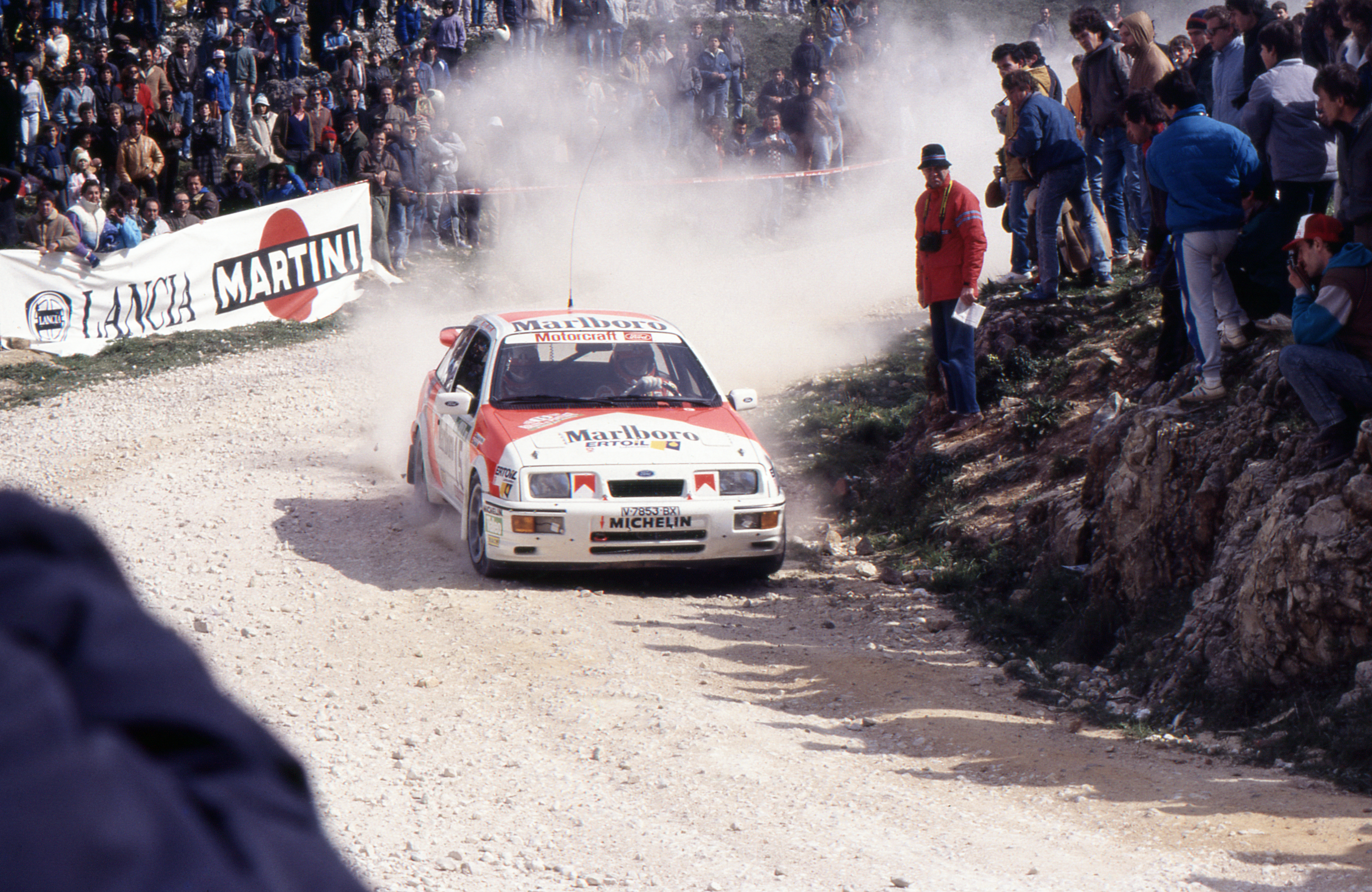
Sierra RS Cosworth rally car driven by Carlos Sainz in the 1988 Rally de Portugal

The Sierra Cosworth was also pressed into service as a rally car, and saw some success. After the abolition of the Group B formula in the World Rally Championship at the end of 1986, manufacturers had to turn to Group A cars and Ford, like most others, found itself without a fully suitable car. The Cosworth was very powerful but, with only rear-wheel-drive, lost out to the four-wheel-drive Lancias and Mazdas on loose-surface events, while the four-wheel-drive XR4x4 had an excellent chassis but an elderly engine producing only around 230 bhp, at least 80 less than the Lancia. For the 1987 season the team ran both, using the XR4x4 on loose surfaces and the Cosworth on tarmac, but the XR4x4's power disadvantage was too great and from 1988 the team concentrated on the Cosworth alone, and continued to use it until the arrival of the Sierra RS Cosworth 4x4 in 1990.

The rear-drive car never won a loose-surface World Rally Championship event, but in the hands of drivers such as Stig Blomqvist, Carlos Sainz and Ari Vatanen it frequently finished in the top five, except when conditions were particularly slippery. On tarmac it was a much more serious competitor, and a young Didier Auriol won the 1988 Corsica Rally outright, the only time that season that Lancia were beaten in a straight fight. However, as Lancia developed the Delta Integrale further and new cars such as the Toyota Celica GT-Four ST165 appeared, the Cosworth became steadily less competitive.

Thanks to strong support and readily available parts from Ford Racing, the Cosworth was a popular car with private teams. Moreover, below world championship level, four-wheel-drive opposition was limited at the time, and the Cosworth was as fast as any of its two-wheel-drive rivals. It lacked the fine handling of the BMW M3, for example, but on the other hand it was much more powerful. It was also very reliable. Consequently, it became a very popular car at the national championship level, and during the late 1980s Sierra drivers won many national series. For example, Jimmy McRae took the British Rally Championship in a Sierra in 1987 and 1988, whilst Carlos Sainz won the Spanish Rally Championship, and Didier Auriol won the French Rally Championship in those same years. The Cosworth was popular with spectators because it was visually dramatic, with its flame-spitting exhaust and tail-sliding, rear-drive handling; and it was popular with amateur drivers because it was competitive, robust and relatively cheap. To this day it is a fairly common sight at lower-level events.

=== WRC Victories ===
| No. | Event | Season | Driver | Co-driver | Car |
|---|---|---|---|---|---|
| 1 | (France) 32ème Tour de Corse | 1988 | (France) Didier Auriol | (France) Bernard Occelli | Ford Sierra RS Cosworth |

== Sierra Sapphire RS Cosworth (RWD) ==
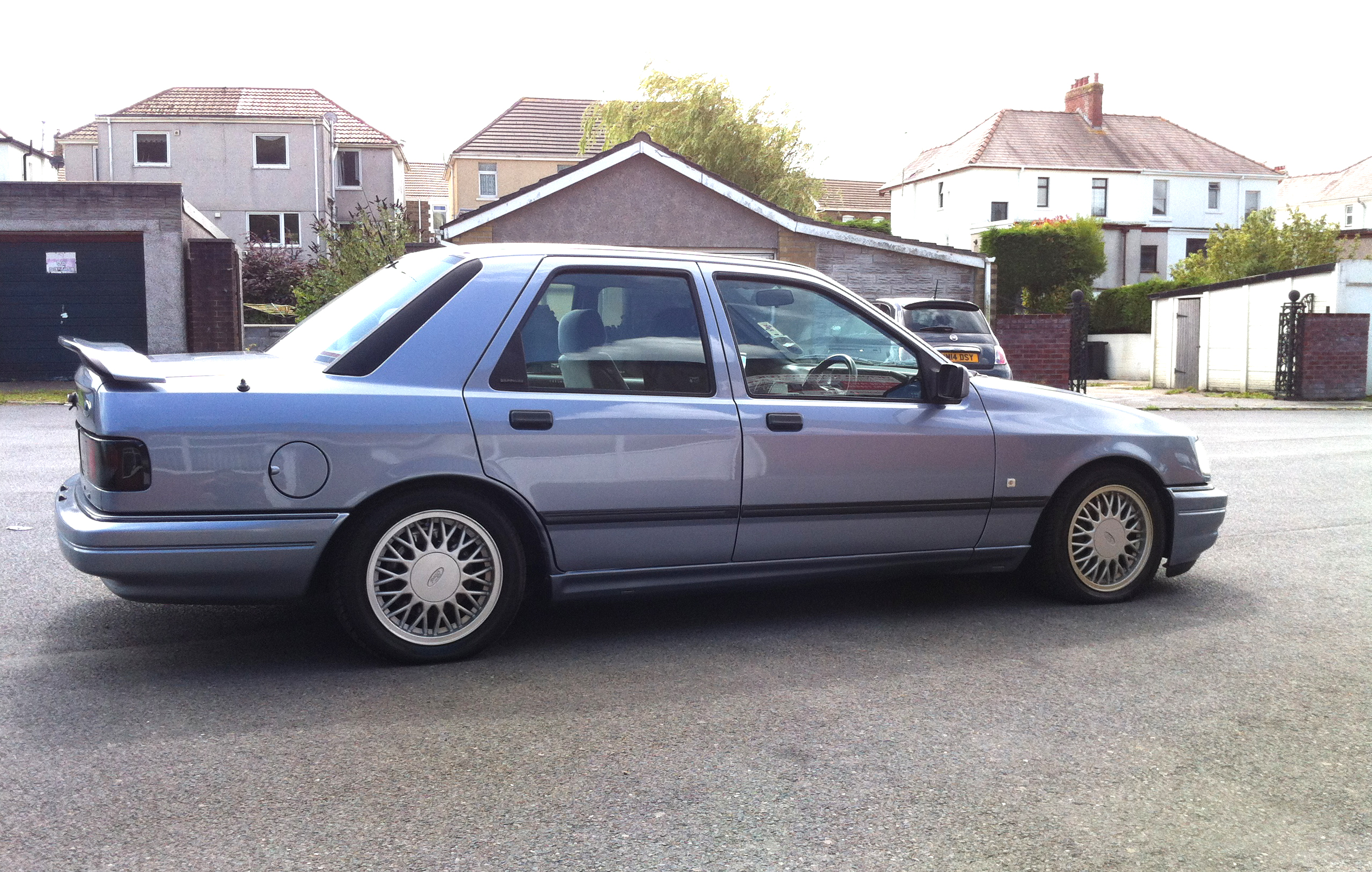
Ford Sierra (Sapphire) RS Cosworth 2WD

The second generation four-door Sierra Sapphire Cosworth was assembled in Genk, Belgium, with the UK-built Ford-Cosworth YBB engine. Cylinder heads on this car were early spec two wheel drive heads and also the "later" two wheel drive head which had some improvements which made their way to the 4X4 head. Suspension was essentially the same with some minor changes in geometry to suit a less aggressive driving style and favour ride over handling. Spindles, wheel offset and other changes were responsible for this effect. Approximately 13,140 examples were produced during 1988–1989 and were the most numerous and lightest of all Sierra Cosworth models. Specifically the left hand drive models (LHD) which saved weight with a lesser trim level such as roll up rear windows, no air conditioning etc.

In the UK, the RHD 1988–1989 Sierra Sapphire RS Cosworths are badged with small "Sapphire" badges on the rear door window trims. All 1988–1989 LHD models are badged and registered as Sierra RS Cosworths with no Sapphire nomenclature at all. "Sapphire" being viewed as a Ghia trim level that saw power rear windows, air conditioning and other minor options.

The Sapphire Cosworth, being based on a different shell to the original three-door Cosworth, along with its more discreet rear wing, recorded a drag co-efficient of 0.33, thus allowing it to register slightly better performance figures (top speed of 150 mph [240 km/h] and 0–60 mph [0–97 km/h] of 6.1 seconds) compared to the original Cosworth.

== Sierra RS Cosworth 4x4 ==
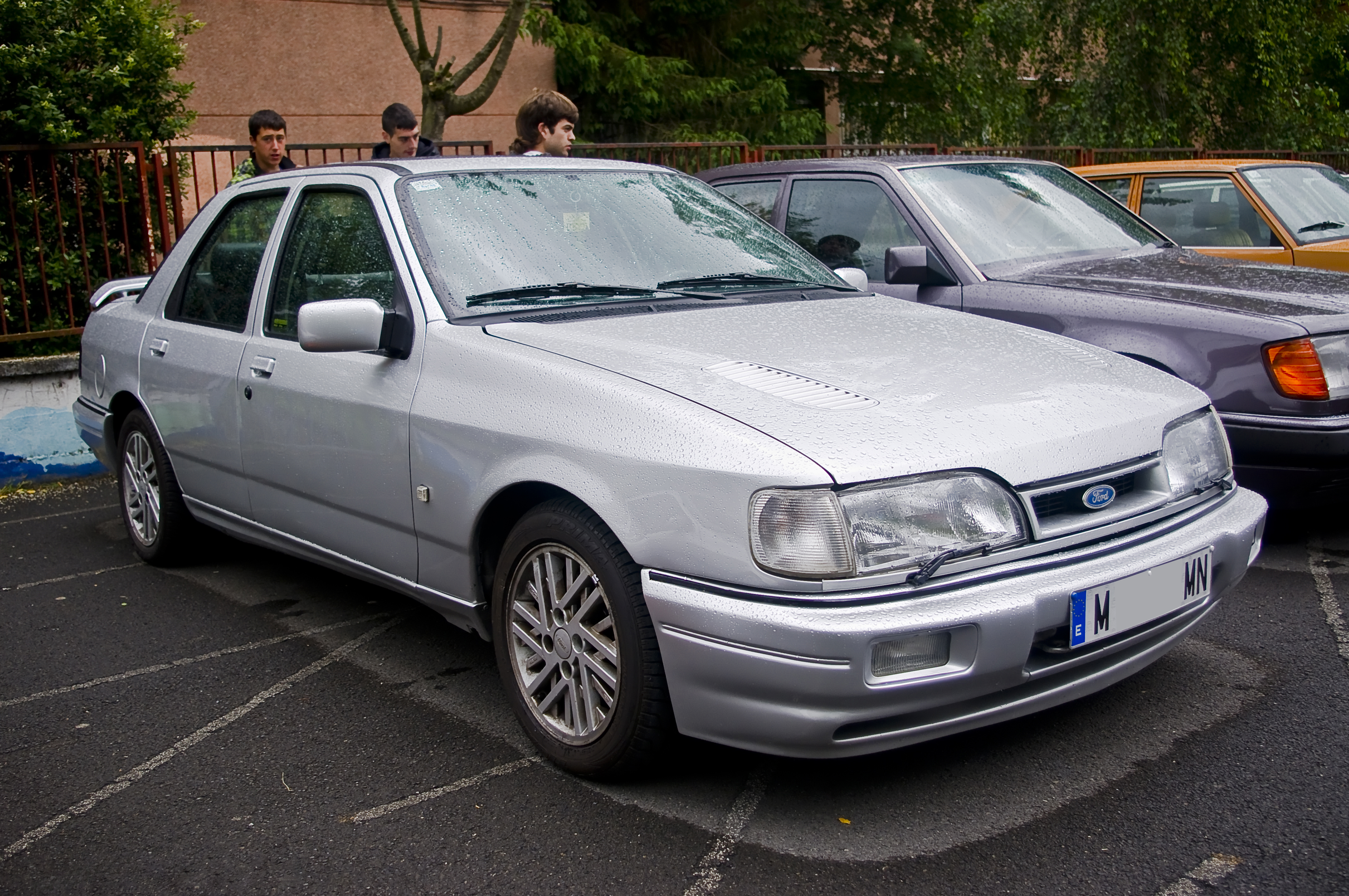
Ford Sierra RS Cosworth 4x4

In January 1990 the third generation Sierra RS Cosworth was launched, this time with four wheel drive. As early as 1987, Mike Moreton and Ford Motorsport had been talking about a four-wheel drive Sierra RS Cosworth that could make Ford competitive in the World Rally Championship. The Ferguson MT75 gearbox that was considered an essential part of the project wasn't available until late 1989 however.

Ford Motorsport's desire for a 3-door "Motorsport Special" equivalent to the original Sierra RS Cosworth was not embraced. The more discreet 4-door version was considered to have a better market potential. It was therefore decided that the new car should be a natural development of the second generation, to be launched in conjunction with the face lift scheduled for the entire Sierra line in 1990.

The waiting time gave Ford Motorsport a good opportunity to conduct extensive testing and demand improvements. One example was the return of the bonnet louvres. According to Ford's own publicity material, 80% of the engine parts were also modified. The improved engine was designated YBG for cars with a catalytic converter and YBJ for cars without. The former had the red valve cover replaced by a green one, to emphasize the environmental friendliness. Four wheel drive and an increasing amount of equipment had raised the weight by 100 kg, and the power was therefore increased to just about compensate for this.

The Sierra RS Cosworth 4x4 received, if possible, an even more flattering response than its predecessors and production continued until the end of 1992, when the Sierra was replaced by the Mondeo. The replacement for the Sierra RS Cosworth was not a Mondeo however, but the Escort RS Cosworth. Based on the Sierra Cosworth platform, the Escort went on sale in May 1992, more than a year after the first pre-production examples were shown to the public, and was homologated for Group A rally in December, just as the Sierra RS Cosworth was retired.

The 4x4 Cosworth made a few appearances as a works rally car in 1990, and then tackled a full World Championship programme for 1991 and 1992. It was not a great success and never won a World Championship event, although in the hands of drivers such as François Delecour and Massimo Biasion it did take several second and third places. Initially it was unreliable, the gearbox being an especially weak point, and although by 1992 the reliability problems had been solved the Cosworth was never quite as effective in most conditions as some of its rivals. It was a relatively large car, slightly heavy, and less sophisticated than the latter generations of the Lancia Delta and Toyota Celica in terms of transmission systems and electronics. Biasion was reputedly strongly critical of the car on his first events for the team in 1992, but earned its best World Championship finish on that year's Rally of Portugal, where he finished second. He also brought its World Championship career to a close with fifth place on that Lombard RAC Rally. By then technical development of the Sierra had ceased, and most of the team's effort was directed towards the upcoming Escort Cosworth, which promised to be a much more competitive prospect.

Like the rear-drive car, the Cosworth 4x4 was popular at lower levels of rallying and a consistent winner at national championship level, and it remains a popular car among amateur rally drivers.
