= AFX =

AFX may refer to:

- AFX Windows Rootkit 2003, a user-mode Windows rootkit that hides files, processes and registry
- AFX News Limited, a London financial news agency
- Animation Framework eXtension, a model for representing 3D graphics content defined in MPEG-4 Part 16
- Aphex Twin (born 1971), electronic musician
- Application Framework eXtensions, an old name for the Microsoft Foundation Class Library (MFC)
- Aurora AFX, a brand of slot car marketed by Aurora Plastics Corporation
- A replacement for the A-6 Intruder, developed by the US Navy and US Air Force (canceled in 1991)
