= Aurora AFX =

Former slot cars models and sets

AFX
- Product type: Slot cars
- Current owner: Aurora Plastics Corporation
- Introduced: 1961
- Discontinued: 1983; 43 years ago
- Markets: U.S.

AFX (initials of "Aurora Factory Experimentals") is a brand of slot cars models and sets introduced by the Aurora Plastics Corporation in 1961. The AFX brand continued production until the company was forced into receivership in 1983.

== History ==
Aurora designed the AFX cars with interchangeable car body shells usually compatible with each chassis they released during these years. The original 1971 A/FX chassis utilized an updated version of the existing pancake motor design of Aurora's "Thunderjet 500" line, popular in the 1960s. Aurora then released a longer version of the A/FX chassis in 1973, known as the "Specialty" chassis, which incorporated a longer wheelbase and gearplate (and often a more powerful armature) with bodies unique to that chassis. The car bodies designed to fit the shorter original chassis featured a clever snap-on design while the bodies for the Specialty chassis were affixed with a small screw.

In 1974, Aurora redesigned both the original and Specialty chassis and exposed the bottom of the motor magnets. The exposed magnets were attracted to the metal rails in the track during racing, creating downforce to help hold the car on the track while cornering. AFX "Magna-Traction" cars remained popular from their release in 1974 throughout 1983, even after faster chassis designs were introduced in house and by Tyco.

Aurora introduced the innovative "G-Plus" in-line motor chassis in 1976. This design allowed the manufacture of narrow, open wheel Formula 1 style bodies. A version of the chassis was also released that would fit most of the previous tab-mounted AFX bodies. Aurora never designed an in-line chassis for the longer Specialty chassis bodies. In 1977, Aurora initiated several attempts at AFX-based slotless car chassis designs. These included the Ultra-5, Speed Steer, and Scre-e-echers Magna-Steering. Another in-line chassis design similar to the G-Plus was also introduced as the Super Magna-Traction and SP1000. Trick variants of the Super Magna-Traction include Blazin' Brakes, Speed Shifters and Cats Eyes. Improvements in the form of add-ons to the still popular Magna-Traction chassis, the Magna-Sonic sound box and an overhead light flasher for police cars, were also initiated.

AFX body shells encompassed a variety of themes including the Can-Am racing series, NASCAR and Trans-Am series stock cars, Formula 1, Funny Car Drag Racing, sports cars, off-road cars, and street cars, as well as custom designs.

Aurora contracted with race car drivers whose images and endorsements appeared on AFX Slot Car sets. These included Peter Revson, Jackie Stewart, Mario Andretti, A. J. Foyt, and Richard Petty. Revson's untimely death in 1974 forced Aurora to cover his image with a sticker on already produced boxed sets.

Aurora released only one licensed track set in 1982, when they partnered with the popular Fall Guy TV show. A licensed M*A*S*H set and fire engine set were planned for 1983, but Aurora suspended operations prior to release.

== List of AFX Slot Car Chassis (1971-1983) ==
Year	Description	Notes	Photo
1971	Dated Original A/FX	The earliest chassis displayed either "A/FX 1970" or "A/FX 1971" molded into the chassis.	
1971	Original A/FX	Designed with a central flat armature, and three gears connected to the rear differential gear.	
1972	Original A/FX Flamethrower	Same as original A/FX, but with working headlight.	
1972	Super II	Souped-up version of original A/FX but with gold-plated electrical parts, high RPM four lamination armature, aluminum wheels, weights for better handling, and a lightweight Lexan body designed only for this chassis.	
1973	Original A/FX Specialty	Same design concept as the original A/FX, but with larger rear wheels, and a longer chassis featuring four gears instead of three.	
1974	AFX Magna-Traction	Similar to original A/FX, but with taller magnets extending through bottom of chassis, and motor brushes that rest on springs instead of spring plates on bottom of chassis.	
1974	AFX Magna-Traction Flamethrower	Same as AFX Magna-Traction, but with working headlight.	
1974	AFX Magna-Traction Specialty	Same design concept as AFX Magna-Traction, but with larger rear wheels, and a longer chassis featuring four gears instead of three.	
1976	G-Plus	Innovative in-line motor design that increased speed as well as magnetic exposure to the track rails. This chassis allowed for detailed open wheel Formula 1 style car bodies in its narrow version.	
1976	Magna-Steering	In-line motor chassis with a pivoting front end guided by magnets in the pick up shoes. Released only in battery operated track sets. Later versions included a guide pin as "Screechers."	
1977	Ultra-5	A slotless chassis released in sets from 1977 through 1978. Used a solenoid up front to control the steering.	
1978	Magna-Sonic	Same as the AFX Magna-Traction, but with an additional sound box to simulate a racing engine.	
1978	Super Magna-Traction	Another in-line motor style chassis. Cars sold individually, not in track sets. These cars featured bodies with chromed finishes. Later versions known as the SP1000 (1982-'83).	
1979	Magna-Traction (Overhead lights)	Same as the AFX Magna-Traction, but with overhead lights for police cars.	
1979	Speed Steer	Aurora's improved second slotless racing chassis under the AFX brand. Used reverse polarity to control steering.	
1979	Speed Steer (Road Blocker)	This chassis propelled itself around the track at a slower speed forcing the players to pass it.	
1981	Cat's Eyes	This chassis featured headlights that could be turned on and off.	
1981	Blazin' Brakes	This chassis featured brakes and brake lights that came on when the brakes were activated.	
1981	Speed Shifter	This chassis was included in sets designed to allow shifting between low and high gears.	
1982	Super G-Plus	Aurora released an improved version of the G-Plus. Easily identified by orange magnets and gears.	

== List of AFX Slot Cars (1971-1983) ==
Part #	Mold #	Year Introduced	Description	Type	Car Chassis	Notes	Photo
1751	1751	1971	FERRARI 612 "CAN-AM"	Can-Am Car	Original A/FX	Blue body; #15 white details; wing spoiler. Nose either painted or unpainted.	
1751	1751	1971	FERRARI 612 "CAN-AM"	Can-Am Car	Original A/FX	Red body; #15 white details; with or without wing spoiler; with or without painted nose. Later version dropped #15 from sides.	
1751	1751	1971	FERRARI 612 "CAN-AM"	Can-Am Car	Original A/FX	Yellow body; #15 purple details; wing spoiler; nose detailed.	
1751	1751	1971	FERRARI 612 "CAN-AM"	Can-Am Car	Original A/FX	Yellow body; #15 red details; no wing spoiler; unpainted nose; no #15 on sides.	
1752	1752	1971	AUTO WORLD XLR McLAREN	Can-Am Car	Original A/FX	Orange body; #54; Either no stripe, grey stripe, or black stripe. Black stripe option may or may not include wing spoiler.	
1752	1752	1971	AUTO WORLD XLR McLAREN	Can-Am Car	Original A/FX	Dark orange body; #7; Blue Stripe and wing spoiler; "Peter Revson."	
1752	1752	1971	AUTO WORLD XLR McLAREN	Can-Am Car	Original A/FX	Blue body (opaque and varying shades of translucent blue); #54; white details and wing spoiler.	
1752	1752	1971	AUTO WORLD XLR McLAREN	Can-Am Car	Original A/FX	Blue body; #54; black stripe; green driver, no wing spoiler.	
1752	1752	1971	AUTO WORLD XLR McLAREN	Can-Am Car	Original A/FX	Yellow body (either opaque or translucent); #54; white details and wing spoiler.	
1753	1753	1971	DODGE CHARGER DAYTONA	Stock Car	Original A/FX	Orange body; #7 with silver details; either clear or blue tinted windshield; either flat black or gloss black hood.	
1753	1753	1971	DODGE CHARGER DAYTONA	Stock Car	Original A/FX	Yellow body (opaque or translucent); #7 with silver details; either clear or blue tinted windshield.	
1753	1753	1971	DODGE CHARGER DAYTONA	Stock Car	Original A/FX	Blue body; #7 with silver details; either clear or blue tinted windshield; either flat black or gloss black hood.	
1754	1754	1971	"TOO MUCH"	Custom Car	Original A/FX	Yellow body; Orange roof and hood.	
1754	1754	1971	"TOO MUCH"	Custom Car	Original A/FX	Red body; Flat black or gloss black roof and hood.	
1754	1754	1971	"TOO MUCH"	Custom Car	Original A/FX	Orange body; Purple roof and hood.	
1754	1754	1971	"TOO MUCH"	Custom Car	Original A/FX	Lime body; 4 varying shades of dark green roof and hood.	
1755	1755	1971	"TURBO TURNON"	Custom Car	Original A/FX	White body; Red and blue stripes with stars, either large or small; nose may be painted or unpainted.	
1755	1755	1971	"TURBO TURNON"	Custom Car	Original A/FX	Yellow body (in a lighter and darker variation); blue stripes; nose may be painted or unpainted.	
1755	1755	1971	"TURBO TURNON"	Custom Car	Original A/FX	Orange body; purple and yellow stripes.	
1756	1756	1971	CAMARO Z-28 "TRANS-AM"	Sports Car	Original A/FX	White body; #3 with red stripe; silver grill and headlight lenses; blue or clear windshield.	
1756	1756	1971	CAMARO Z-28 "TRANS-AM"	Sports Car	Original A/FX	White body; #3 with blue stripe; silver grill and headlight lenses; blue or clear windshield.	
1757	None	1971	PORSCHE 917	Can-Am Car	Original A/FX	Baby blue body; #2 with orange stripe; detailed nose; open air vent; either clear or dark windshield.	
1757	None	1971	PORSCHE 917	Can-Am Car	Original A/FX	Yellow body (either opaque or translucent); #2 with blue stripe; detailed nose; open air vent; either clear or dark windshield.	
1757	None	1971	PORSCHE 917	Can-Am Car	Original A/FX	White body; #2 with green stripe; detailed nose; open air vent; either clear or dark windshield.	
1757	None	1971	PORSCHE 917	Can-Am Car	Original A/FX	White body; #2 with purple stripe; detailed nose; open air vent; either clear or dark windshield.	
1758	1758	1971	PLYMOUTH 'CUDA FUNNY CAR	Drag Car	Original A/FX	Orange body; yellow sides; purple stripes on top.	
1758	1758	1971	PLYMOUTH 'CUDA FUNNY CAR	Drag Car	Original A/FX	White body; yellow sides; red stripes on top.	
1758	1758	1971	PLYMOUTH 'CUDA FUNNY CAR	Drag Car	Original A/FX	White body; mustard sides; orange stripes on top.	
1758	1758	1971	PLYMOUTH 'CUDA FUNNY CAR	Drag Car	Original A/FX	White body; red stripes on top.	
1758	1758	1971	PLYMOUTH 'CUDA FUNNY CAR	Drag Car	Original A/FX	White body; red sides; blue stripes on top.	
1758	1758	1971	PLYMOUTH 'CUDA FUNNY CAR	Drag Car	Original A/FX	White body; blue sides; red stripes on top.	
1758	1758	1971	PLYMOUTH 'CUDA FUNNY CAR	Drag Car	Original A/FX	Blue body; white stripes on top.	
1759	1759	1971	VEGA VAN "GASSER"	Drag Car	Original A/FX	Orange body; red flames	
1759	1759	1971	VEGA VAN "GASSER"	Drag Car	Original A/FX	Orange body	
1759	1759	1971	VEGA VAN "GASSER"	Drag Car	Original A/FX	Yellow body (opaque or translucent); red flames	
1759	1759	1971	VEGA VAN "GASSER"	Drag Car	Original A/FX	Yellow body	
1759	1759	1971	VEGA VAN "GASSER"	Drag Car	Original A/FX	White body; red flames	
1759	1759	1971	VEGA VAN "GASSER"	Drag Car	Original A/FX	White body; fluorescent flames	
1760	1760	1971	'57 CHEVY NOMAD	Street Car	Original A/FX	Pink body (different shades); purple stripes (different shades); white exhaust pipes; red windshield.	
1760	1760	1971	'57 CHEVY NOMAD	Street Car	Original A/FX	Lime body; green stripes (different shades); white exhaust pipes; red windshield.	
1760	1760	1971	'57 CHEVY NOMAD	Street Car	Original A/FX	Light orange body; blue exhaust pipes; red windshield.	
1760	1760	1971	'57 CHEVY NOMAD	Street Car	Original A/FX	Pink body (different shades); white exhaust pipes; red windshield.	
1760	1760	1971	'57 CHEVY NOMAD	Street Car	Original A/FX	Yellow body (opaque or translucent); orange exhaust pipes; red windshield.	
1760	1760	1971	'57 CHEVY NOMAD	Street Car	Original A/FX	Brown body (different shades); white exhaust pipes; red windshield.	
1760	1760	1971	'57 CHEVY NOMAD	Street Car	Original A/FX	Lime body; white exhaust pipes; red windshield.	
1760	1760	1971	'57 CHEVY NOMAD	Street Car	Original A/FX	White body; Silver exhaust pipes; red windshield.	
1761	1761	1971	PINTO FUNNY CAR	Drag Car	Original A/FX	Lime body; blue stripes	
1761	1761	1971	PINTO FUNNY CAR	Drag Car	Original A/FX	Orange body; purple stripes	
1761	1761	1971	PINTO FUNNY CAR	Drag Car	Original A/FX	Orange body; pink stripes	
1761	1761	1971	PINTO FUNNY CAR	Drag Car	Original A/FX	Blue body; white stripes	
1762	1762	1972	PLYMOUTH ROAD RUNNER	Stock Car	Original A/FX	Red body; #43; white details.	
1762	1762	1972	PLYMOUTH ROAD RUNNER	Stock Car	Original A/FX	Yellow body; #43, black and white details.	
1762	1762	1972	PLYMOUTH ROAD RUNNER	Stock Car	Original A/FX	Blue body (different shades); #43, white details.	
1762	1762	1972	PLYMOUTH ROAD RUNNER	Stock Car	Original A/FX	Red body; #43; blue top and nose.	
1762	1762	1972	PLYMOUTH ROAD RUNNER	Stock Car	Original A/FX	Blue body; #43; red top and blue nose.	
1763	None	1972	FERRARI 512M	Can-Am Car	Original A/FX	Dark blue body; #6; yellow details; open vent; clear or dark windshield.	
1763	None	1972	FERRARI 512M	Can-Am Car	Original A/FX	Red body; #6; white details; open vent; clear or dark windshield.	
1763	None	1972	FERRARI 512M	Can-Am Car	Original A/FX	White body; #6; blue details; open vent; clear or dark windshield.	
1764	1764	1972	JAVELIN AMX "TRANS-AM"	Sports Car	Original A/FX	Blue body; #6 painted red and white details; clear or blue tinted glass.	
1765	1764	1972	JAVELIN PRO STOCKER	Stock Car	Original A/FX	White body; purple stripe; clear windshield	
1765	1764	1972	JAVELIN PRO STOCKER	Stock Car	Original A/FX	Lime body; black stripe; clear or blue windshield	
1765	1764	1972	JAVELIN PRO STOCKER	Stock Car	Original A/FX	Orange body; black stripe; clear or blue windshield	
1765	1764	1972	JAVELIN PRO STOCKER	Stock Car	Original A/FX	Yellow body; black stripe; clear or blue windshield	
1766	1766	1972	CORVETTE FUNNY CAR	Drag Car	Original A/FX	Yellow body; black details	
1766	1766	1972	CORVETTE FUNNY CAR	Drag Car	Original A/FX	White body; red and blue details	
1766	1766	1972	CORVETTE FUNNY CAR	Drag Car	Original A/FX	Orange body; purple details	
1767	1767	1972	LOLA T-260 "CAN-AM"	Can-Am Car	Original A/FX	White body; Red and black stripes; "L & M"	
1768	1768	1972	SHADOW "CAN-AM"	Can-Am Car	Original A/FX	Black body #101 "Shadow." Earliest release featured shorter and thinner spoiler supports. These also lacked the step edge around the front half of the front wheel wells.	
1769	1769	1972	FORD "BAJA BRONCO"	Off Road Car	Original A/FX	Yellow body (opaque or translucent); #3; detailed grill; either tall roof or lower, angled roof.	
1769	1769	1972	FORD "BAJA BRONCO"	Off Road Car	Original A/FX	Lemon yellow body; #3; detailed or undetailed grill.	
1769	1769	1972	FORD "BAJA BRONCO"	Off Road Car	Original A/FX	Butterscotch body; #3;detailed or undetailed grill; tall roof or lower, angled roof.	
1769	1769	1972	FORD "BAJA BRONCO"	Off Road Car	Original A/FX	Red body; #3; detailed or undetailed grill; tall roof or lower, angled roof.	
1769	1769	1972	FORD "BAJA BRONCO"	Off Road Car	Original A/FX	Blue body; #3; detailed or undetailed grill; tall roof or lower, angled roof.	
1772	1772	1973	"DODGE FEVER"	Drag Car	Original A/FX Special	White body; yellow nose; "Dodge Fever" stickers.	
1773	1773	1972	DODGE CHARGER STOCK CAR	Stock Car	Original A/FX	Lime body; #11 in green; silver window net; green windshield.	
1773	1773	1972	DODGE CHARGER STOCK CAR	Stock Car	Original A/FX	Lime body; #11 in red; silver window net; clear windshield.	
1773	1773	1972	DODGE CHARGER STOCK CAR	Stock Car	Original A/FX	Butterscotch body; #11 in red; silver window net; green windshield.	
1773	1773	1972	DODGE CHARGER STOCK CAR	Stock Car	Original A/FX	White body; #11 in red; black window net; clear or green windshield.	
1774	1774	1973	"FURIOUS FUELER"	Drag Car	Original A/FX Special	White body; yellow nose; "Furious Feuler" stickers.	
1775	1775	1973	BRE-DATSUN 240Z	Sports Car	Original A/FX	Red body; #46; white sides; blue stripes; blue windshield. Datsun stickers included in on cars in rare Datsun promotional set. Polaroid stickers included on cars in rare Polaroid promotional set.	
1776	1776	1973	BRE-DATSUN 510 "TRANS-AM"	Street Car	Original A/FX	Red body; #46; white sides with blue stripes.	
1776	1776	1973	BRE-DATSUN 510 "TRANS-AM"	Street Car	Original A/FX	Light blue body; #35; white sides with red stripes.	
1776	1776	1973	BRE-DATSUN 510 "TRANS-AM"	Street Car	Original A/FX	Dark blue body; #35; white sides with red stripes.	
1776	1776	1973	BRE-DATSUN 510 "TRANS-AM"	Street Car	Original A/FX	Medium blue body; #35; white sides with red stripes.	
1777	1708	1973	'55 CHEVY BEL AIR	Street Car	Original A/FX	Lime (opaque or translucent) body; white exhaust pipes, blue windshield; red tail lights.	
1777	1708	1973	'55 CHEVY BEL AIR	Street Car	Original A/FX	Yellow (opaque or translucent) body; silver or white exhaust pipes, blue windshield; red or unpainted tail lights. Sometimes includes "You lose" or "Badman" paper stickers.	
1777	1708	1973	'55 CHEVY BEL AIR	Street Car	Original A/FX	Blue body; silver exhaust pipes.	
1777	1708	1973	'55 CHEVY BEL AIR	Street Car	Original A/FX	Orange (opaque or translucent) body; silver or white exhaust pipes; blue windshield; red or unpainted tail lights.	
1778	1778	1973	"BAJA BUG" VW	Off Road Car	Original A/FX	Lime body (different shades, opaque or translucent); blue windshield; blue gas tanks.	
1778	1778	1973	"BAJA BUG" VW	Off Road Car	Original A/FX	Yellow body (different shades, opaque or translucent); red windshield; black gas tanks.	
1778	1778	1973	"BAJA BUG" VW	Off Road Car	Original A/FX	Orange body (different shades); green windshield; black gas tanks.	
1778	1778	1973	"BAJA BUG" VW	Off Road Car	Original A/FX	Red body; green windshield; black gas tanks.	
1778	1778	1973	"BAJA BUG" VW	Off Road Car	Original A/FX	White body; red windshield; black gas tanks.	
1781	1781	1973	ROARIN' ROLLS "GOLDEN GHOST"	Drag Car	Original A/FX Special	White body.	
1781	1781	1973	ROARIN' ROLLS "GOLDEN GHOST"	Drag Car	Original A/FX Special	Black body.	
1781	1781	1973	ROARIN' ROLLS "GOLDEN GHOST"	Drag Car	Original A/FX Special	Yellow (opaque or translucent) body.	
1782	1782	1973	PEACE TANK	Custom Car	Original A/FX Special	Green body (two different shades)	
1786	1786	1972	PORSCHE 510K "CAN-AM"	Can-Am Car	Original A/FX	Orange body; #4; yellow and white stripes "Sunoco"	
1786	1786	1972	PORSCHE 510K "CAN-AM"	Can-Am Car	Original A/FX	White body; #5; green and blue stripes "Sunoco"	
1786	1786	1972	PORSCHE 510K "CAN-AM"	Can-Am Car	Original A/FX	Blue body; #6; yellow and red stripes "Sunoco"	
1786	1786	1972	PORSCHE 510K "CAN-AM"	Can-Am Car	Original A/FX	Translucent Yellow body; #7; blue and black stripes "Sunoco"	
1786	1786	1972	PORSCHE 510K "CAN-AM"	Can-Am Car	Original A/FX	Red body; #6; yellow and white stripes.	
1786	1786	1972	PORSCHE 510K "CAN-AM"	Can-Am Car	Original A/FX	White body; #6; red and black stripes; with or without "L & M" on rear spoiler.	
1787	1787	1973	MATADOR STOCK CAR	Stock Car	Original A/FX	White body; #16; red tail; blue front.	
1787	1787	1973	MATADOR STOCK CAR	Stock Car	Original A/FX	White body; #2; blue details.	
1787	1787	1973	MATADOR STOCK CAR	Stock Car	Original A/FX	Yellow body; #2; red details.	
1788	1788	1972	SUPER II	Can-AM Car	Super II	Red or yellow body; #4.	
1791	1791	1973	'31 MODEL "A" FORD PANEL	Street Car	Original A/FX Special	Yellow body.	
1791	1791	1973	'31 MODEL "A" FORD PANEL	Street Car	Original A/FX Special	Blue body.	
1791	1791	1973	'31 MODEL "A" FORD PANEL	Street Car	Original A/FX Special	Orange body.	
1791	1791	1973	'31 MODEL "A" FORD PANEL	Street Car	Original A/FX Special	Lime body (different shades, opaque and translucent).	
1792	1772	1973	"AZTEC"	Drag Car	Original A/FX Special	Red body.	
1794	1774	1973	"DYNO-MITE"	Drag Car	Original A/FX Special	White body; blue details.	
1701	1701	1974	'30 MODEL "A" COUPE	Street Car	Original A/FX Special	Blue body.	
1701	1701	1974	'30 MODEL "A" COUPE	Street Car	Original A/FX Special	Yellow body.	
1701	1701	1974	'30 MODEL "A" COUPE	Street Car	Original A/FX Special	Black body.	
1702	1702	1974	GRAND AM FUNNY CAR	Drag Car	Original A/FX Special	Yellow body; orange details.	
1702	1702	1974	GRAND AM FUNNY CAR	Drag Car	Original A/FX Special	White body; Red and blue details. Silver painted or unpainted exhaust pipes.	
1702	1702	1974	GRAND AM FUNNY CAR	Drag Car	Original A/FX Special	Blue body; yellow and red details.	
1703	1703	1974	CORVETTE A-PRODUCTION	Sports Car	Original A/FX	Yellow body; black stripe; silver headlights; painted or unpainted grill; white or silver exhaust pipes.	
1703	1703	1974	CORVETTE A-PRODUCTION	Sports Car	Original A/FX	Yellow body; white stripe; silver headlights; painted grill; white exhaust pipes.	
1703	1703	1974	CORVETTE A-PRODUCTION	Sports Car	Original A/FX	Black body; yellow stripe; silver headlights; silver exhaust pipes.	
1703	1703	1974	CORVETTE A-PRODUCTION	Sports Car	Original A/FX	Blue body; white stripe; silver headlights; silver exhaust pipes.	
1704	1704	1974	CHEVELLE STOCKER	Stock Car	Original A/FX	Blue body; #17; green stripes.	
1704	1704	1974	CHEVELLE STOCKER	Stock Car	Original A/FX	Butterscotch body; #17; red stripes; painted or unpainted window net; with or without headlight lenses.	
1704	1704	1974	CHEVELLE STOCKER	Stock Car	Original A/FX	White body; #17; orange stripes; with or without headlight lenses.	
1745	1745	1974	DATSUN 1600 BAJA PICKUP	Off Road Car	Original A/FX	Yellow body; #211 in blue; blue windshield, painted or unpainted headlights.	
1745	1745	1974	DATSUN 1600 BAJA PICKUP	Off Road Car	Original A/FX	Yellow body; blue or clear windshield.	
1745	1745	1974	DATSUN 1600 BAJA PICKUP	Off Road Car	Original A/FX	Butterscotch body; green windshield.	
1745	1745	1974	DATSUN 1600 BAJA PICKUP	Off Road Car	Original A/FX	Blue body; #211 in white; red windshield.	
1745	1745	1974	DATSUN 1600 BAJA PICKUP	Off Road Car	Original A/FX	Blue body; red windshield.	
1746	1746	1974	'29 MODEL A WOODIE	Street Car	Original A/FX Special	Black body; yellow (opaque or translucent)	
1747	1747	1974	PORSCHE 917-10 CAN-AM	Can-Am Car	Original A/FX	White body; #16 or #23 stickers; blue and red stripes; silver or blue driver; white or black seat; square front end; "RC".	
1748	1748	1974	DODGE STREET VAN	Street Car	Original A/FX Special	Lime (opaque or translucent) body; dark windshield; blue stripe; red tail lights.	
1748	1748	1974	DODGE STREET VAN	Street Car	Original A/FX Special	Orange (opaque or translucent) body; red windshield; black stripe; black tail lights.	
1798	None	1972	"FLAMETHROWER" PORSCHE 917	Can-Am Car	Original A/FX (lights)	Baby blue body; #2 with orange stripe; detailed nose; open air vent; either clear or dark windshield.	
1798	None	1972	"FLAMETHROWER" PORSCHE 917	Can-Am Car	Original A/FX (lights)	Yellow body (either opaque or translucent); #2 with blue stripe; detailed nose; open air vent; either clear or dark windshield.	
1798	None	1972	"FLAMETHROWER" PORSCHE 917	Can-Am Car	Original A/FX (lights)	White body; #2 with green stripe; detailed nose; open air vent; either clear or dark windshield.	
1798	None	1972	"FLAMETHROWER" PORSCHE 917	Can-Am Car	Original A/FX (lights)	White body; #2 with purple stripe; detailed nose; open air vent; either clear or dark windshield.	
1799	None	1972	"FLAMETHROWER" FERRARI 512M	Can-Am Car	Original A/FX (lights)	Dark blue body; #6; yellow details; open vent; clear or dark windshield.	
1799	None	1972	"FLAMETHROWER" FERRARI 512M	Can-Am Car	Original A/FX (lights)	Red body; #6; white details; open vent; clear or dark windshield.	
1799	None	1972	"FLAMETHROWER" FERRARI 512M	Can-Am Car	Original A/FX (lights)	White body; #6; blue details; open vent; clear or dark windshield.	
1900	1753	1974	DODGE CHARGER DAYTONA	Stock Car	AFX Magna-traction	Yellow body (opaque or translucent); #7 with or without silver details; either clear or blue tinted windshield.	
1900	1753	1974	DODGE CHARGER DAYTONA	Stock Car	AFX Magna-traction	Blue body (also rare dark blue); #7 with or without silver details; blue tinted windshield; either flat black or gloss black hood.	
1901	1756	1974	CAMARO Z-28 "TRANS-AM"	Sports Car	AFX Magna-traction	Baby blue body; #3 with purple stripe; silver grill and headlight lenses; blue or clear windshield.	
1901	1756	1974	CAMARO Z-28 "TRANS-AM"	Sports Car	AFX Magna-traction	White body; #3 with blue stripe; silver grill and headlight lenses; blue windshield.	
1901	1756	1974	CAMARO Z-28 "TRANS-AM"	Sports Car	AFX Magna-traction	White body; #6 with red, blue and silver stripes; black grill and headlight lenses; blue windshield.	
1902	None	1974	PORSCHE 917	Can-Am Car	AFX Magna-traction	Baby blue body; #2 with orange stripe; detailed nose; open air vent; either clear or dark windshield.	
1902	None	1974	PORSCHE 917	Can-Am Car	AFX Magna-traction	Yellow body (either opaque or translucent); #2 with blue stripe; detailed nose; open air vent; either clear or dark windshield.	
1902	None	1974	PORSCHE 917	Can-Am Car	AFX Magna-traction	White body; #2 with green stripe; detailed nose; open air vent; either clear or dark windshield.	
1902	None	1974	PORSCHE 917	Can-Am Car	AFX Magna-traction	White body; #2 with purple stripe; detailed nose; open air vent; either clear or dark windshield.	
1903	1760	1974	'57 CHEVY NOMAD	Street Car	AFX Magna-traction	Orange body; yellow startburst stripes; silver exhaust pipes; dark windshield	
1903	1760	1974	'57 CHEVY NOMAD	Street Car	AFX Magna-traction	Red body; white starburst stripes; silver exhaust pipes; dark windshield.	
1903	1760	1974	'57 CHEVY NOMAD	Street Car	AFX Magna-traction	Lime body; green stripes (different shades); white exhaust pipes; red windshield.	
1903	1760	1974	'57 CHEVY NOMAD	Street Car	AFX Magna-traction	Blue body (different shades); silver stripes; white exhaust pipes; red windshield.	
1903	1760	1974	'57 CHEVY NOMAD	Street Car	AFX Magna-traction	Orange body (opaque or translucent); white exhaust pipes; green windshield.	
1903	1760	1974	'57 CHEVY NOMAD	Street Car	AFX Magna-traction	Light orange body; white exhaust pipes; green windshield.	
1903	1760	1974	'57 CHEVY NOMAD	Street Car	AFX Magna-traction	Light orange body; white exhaust pipes; red windshield.	
1903	1760	1974	'57 CHEVY NOMAD	Street Car	AFX Magna-traction	Blue body (opaque or translucent); white exhaust pipes; red windshield.	
1904	1762	1974	PLYMOUTH ROAD RUNNER	Stock Car	AFX Magna-traction	Lemon Yellow body; #43; orange top and nose.	
1904	1762	1974	PLYMOUTH ROAD RUNNER	Stock Car	AFX Magna-traction	White body; #43; blue top and nose.	
1904	1762	1974	PLYMOUTH ROAD RUNNER	Stock Car	AFX Magna-traction	Blue body; #43; red top and blue nose.	
1904	1762	1974	PLYMOUTH ROAD RUNNER	Stock Car	AFX Magna-traction	Blue body; #43; red top and red nose.	
1905	None	1974	FERRARI 512M	Can-Am Car	AFX Magna-traction	Red body; #6; white details; open vent; clear or dark windshield.	
1905	None	1974	FERRARI 512M	Can-Am Car	AFX Magna-traction	White body; #6; blue details; open vent; clear or dark windshield.	
1905	None	1974	FERRARI 512M	Can-Am Car	AFX Magna-traction	Blue body; #2; white details; open vent; clear or dark windshield.	
1905	None	1974	FERRARI 512M	Can-Am Car	AFX Magna-traction	Red body; #2; white details; open vent; clear or dark windshield.	
1905	None	1974	FERRARI 512M	Can-Am Car	AFX Magna-traction	White body; #2; blue details; open or closed vent; clear or dark windshield.	
1906	1764	1974	JAVELIN AMX "TRANS-AM"	Sports Car	AFX Magna-traction	Butterscotch body; #5 (painted either black or grey on hood); red stripes	
1906	1764	1974	JAVELIN AMX "TRANS-AM"	Sports Car	AFX Magna-traction	Blue body; #5 (painted either black or grey on hood); black stripes	
1907	1767	1974	LOLA T-260 "CAN-AM"	Can-Am Car	AFX Magna-traction	White body; Red and black stripes; "L & M"	
1908	1768	1974	SHADOW "CAN-AM"	Can-Am Car	AFX Magna-traction	Black body #101 "Shadow." Earliest release featured shorter and thinner spoiler supports. These also lacked the step edge around the front half of the front wheel wells.	
1909	1769	1974	FORD "BAJA BRONCO"	Off Road Car	AFX Magna-traction	Yellow body (opaque or translucent); #3; detailed grill; either tall roof or lower, angled roof.	
1909	1769	1974	FORD "BAJA BRONCO"	Off Road Car	AFX Magna-traction	Lemon yellow body; #3; detailed or undetailed grill.	
1909	1769	1974	FORD "BAJA BRONCO"	Off Road Car	AFX Magna-traction	Butterscotch body; #3;detailed or undetailed grill; tall roof or lower, angled roof.	
1909	1769	1974	FORD "BAJA BRONCO"	Off Road Car	AFX Magna-traction	Red body; #3; detailed or undetailed grill; tall roof or lower, angled roof.	
1909	1769	1974	FORD "BAJA BRONCO"	Off Road Car	AFX Magna-traction	Blue body; #3; detailed or undetailed grill; tall roof or lower, angled roof.	
1910	1773	1974	DODGE CHARGER STOCK CAR	Stock Car	AFX Magna-traction	Yellow body; #11 in red; black window net; green windshield.	
1910	1773	1974	DODGE CHARGER STOCK CAR	Stock Car	AFX Magna-traction	Lime body; #11 in green; silver window net; green windshield.	
1910	1773	1974	DODGE CHARGER STOCK CAR	Stock Car	AFX Magna-traction	Lime body; #11 in red; silver window net; clear windshield.	
1910	1773	1974	DODGE CHARGER STOCK CAR	Stock Car	AFX Magna-traction	Butterscotch body; #11 in red; unpainted, silver, or black window net; green windshield.	
1910	1773	1974	DODGE CHARGER STOCK CAR	Stock Car	AFX Magna-traction	White body; #11 in red; black or unpainted window net; clear or green windshield.	
1911	1775	1974	BRE-DATSUN 240Z	Sports Car	AFX Magna-traction	Red body; #46; white sides; with or without blue stripes; blue windshield.	
1911	1775	1974	BRE-DATSUN 240Z	Sports Car	AFX Magna-traction	White body; #46; green sides; with or without yellow stripes; green windshield.	
1911	1775	1974	BRE-DATSUN 240Z	Sports Car	AFX Magna-traction	Red body; #17 stickers; white and orange details.	
1912	1776	1974	BRE-DATSUN 510 "TRANS-AM"	Street Car	AFX Magna-traction	Red body; #35; white sides with blue stripes.	
1912	1776	1974	BRE-DATSUN 510 "TRANS-AM"	Street Car	AFX Magna-traction	Dark Blue body; #35; white sides with red stripes.	
1912	1776	1974	BRE-DATSUN 510 "TRANS-AM"	Street Car	AFX Magna-traction	Light Blue body; #35; white sides with red stripes.	
1912	1776	1974	BRE-DATSUN 510 "TRANS-AM"	Street Car	AFX Magna-traction	Turquoise body; #35; white sides with red stripes.	
1912	1776	1974	BRE-DATSUN 510 "TRANS-AM"	Street Car	AFX Magna-traction	Red body; #46; white sides with blue stripes.	
1912	1776	1974	BRE-DATSUN 510 "TRANS-AM"	Street Car	AFX Magna-traction	Yellow body; #46; orange sides with yellow stripes.	
1912	1776	1974	BRE-DATSUN 510 "TRANS-AM"	Street Car	AFX Magna-traction	Light Olive body; #166 with yellow stripes and "Sugar Daddy" stickers.	
1912	1776	1974	BRE-DATSUN 510 "TRANS-AM"	Street Car	AFX Magna-traction	Dark Olive body; #166 with yellow stripes and "Sugar Daddy" stickers.	
1913	1708	1974	'55 CHEVY BEL AIR	Street Car	AFX Magna-traction	Yellow (opaque or translucent) body; silver or white exhaust pipes; blue windshield; red or unpainted tail lights. Sometimes includes "You lose" or "Badman" paper stickers.	
1913	1708	1974	'55 CHEVY BEL AIR	Street Car	AFX Magna-traction	Orange (opaque or translucent) body; silver or white exhaust pipes; blue windshield; red or unpainted tail lights.	
1913	1708	1974	'55 CHEVY BEL AIR	Street Car	AFX Magna-traction	Blue body; silver exhaust pipes.	
1914	1778	1974	"BAJA BUG" VW	Off Road Car	AFX Magna-traction	Lime body (different shades, opaque or translucent); blue windshield; blue gas tanks.	
1914	1778	1974	"BAJA BUG" VW	Off Road Car	AFX Magna-traction	Yellow body (different shades, opaque or translucent); red windshield; black gas tanks.	
1914	1778	1974	"BAJA BUG" VW	Off Road Car	AFX Magna-traction	Orange body (different shades); green windshield; black gas tanks.	
1914	1778	1974	"BAJA BUG" VW	Off Road Car	AFX Magna-traction	Red body; green windshield; black gas tanks.	
1914	1778	1974	"BAJA BUG" VW	Off Road Car	AFX Magna-traction	Red body; blue windshield; white gas tanks.	
1914	1778	1974	"BAJA BUG" VW	Off Road Car	AFX Magna-traction	White body; red windshield; black gas tanks.	
1720	1767	1974	Lola T-260 "Can-Am"	Can-Am Car	AFX Magna-traction	White body; Red and black stripes; "L & M"	
1721	1781	1974	Roarin' Rolls "Golden Ghost"	Drag Car	AFX Magna-traction Special	White, yellow, or black body.	
1722	1776	1974	Bre-Datsun 510 "Trans-Am	Street Car	AFX Magna-traction	Red body; #46; white sides with blue stripes.	
1723	1775	1974	Bre-Datsun 240Z	Sports Car	AFX Magna-traction	Red body; #46; white sides; blue stripes; blue windshield.	
1724	1778	1974	"Baja Bug" VW	Off Road Car	AFX Magna-traction	Lime body; blue windshield; blue gas tanks.	
1725	1782	1974	Peace Tank	Custom Car	AFX Magna-traction Special	Green body (two different shades)	
1726	1786	1974	Porsche 510K "Can-Am"	Can-Am Car	AFX Magna-traction	Blue body; #6; yellow and red stripes "Sunoco"	
1915	1786	1974	PORSCHE 510K "CAN-AM"	Can-Am Car	AFX Magna-traction	Orange body; #4; yellow and white stripes "Sunoco"	
1915	1786	1974	PORSCHE 510K "CAN-AM"	Can-Am Car	AFX Magna-traction	White body; #5; green and blue stripes "Sunoco"	
1915	1786	1974	PORSCHE 510K "CAN-AM"	Can-Am Car	AFX Magna-traction	Blue body; #6; yellow stripes "Sunoco"	
1915	1786	1974	PORSCHE 510K "CAN-AM"	Can-Am Car	AFX Magna-traction	Translucent Yellow body; #7; blue and blackstripes "Sunoco"	
1915	1786	1974	PORSCHE 510K "CAN-AM"	Can-Am Car	AFX Magna-traction	Red body; #6; yellow and white stripes; with or without center grill support; with or without flattened air vents.	
1915	1786	1974	PORSCHE 510K "CAN-AM"	Can-Am Car	AFX Magna-traction	White body; #6; red and black stripes; with or without "L & M" on rear spoiler; with or without center grill support; with or without flattened air vents.	
1915	1786	1974	PORSCHE 510K "CAN-AM"	Can-Am Car	AFX Magna-traction	White body; #6; yellow driver; blue maroon, and yellow details "auto world"	
1916	1787	1974	MATADOR STOCK CAR	Stock Car	AFX Magna-traction	White body; #2; blue details.	
1916	1787	1974	MATADOR STOCK CAR	Stock Car	AFX Magna-traction	Yellow body; #2; red details.	
1917	1959	1980	BLAZER	Street Car	AFX Magna-traction	Black body; white, light blue and dark blue details.	
1917	1959	1980	BLAZER	Street Car	AFX Magna-traction	White body; red, orange, and yellow details.	
1918	1962	1980	JEEP CJ7	Street Car	AFX Magna-traction	Baby blue body; black roof.	
1918	1962	1980	JEEP CJ7	Street Car	AFX Magna-traction	Red body; black roof.	
1919	1745	1974	DATSUN BAJA PICKUP	Off Road Car	AFX Magna-traction	Yellow body; #211 in blue; blue windshield, painted or unpainted headlights. "Polaroid" stickers included on cars included in Polaroid promotional set.	
1919	1745	1974	DATSUN BAJA PICKUP	Off Road Car	AFX Magna-traction	Butterscotch body (different shades); #211 in red; green windshield. "Polaroid" stickers included on cars included in Polaroid promotional set.	
1919	1745	1974	DATSUN BAJA PICKUP	Off Road Car	AFX Magna-traction	Blue body; #211 in white; red windshield. "Polaroid" stickers included on cars included in Polaroid promotional set.	
1919	1745	1974	DATSUN BAJA PICKUP	Off Road Car	AFX Magna-traction	Butterscotch body; green windshield.	
1920	1746	1974	'29 MODEL A WOODIE	Street Car	AFX Magna-traction Special	Black body; yellow (opaque or translucent)	
1921	1747	1974	PORSCHE 917-10 CAN-AM	Can-Am Car	AFX Magna-traction	White body; #16 or #23 stickers; blue and red stripes; silver or blue driver; white or black seat; square front end; "RC".	
1921	1747	1974	PORSCHE 917-10 CAN-AM	Can-Am Car	AFX Magna-traction	White body; #16 or #23 stickers; blue and red stripes; silver or blue driver; white or black seat; rounded front end; "RC".	
1922	1748	1974	DODGE STREET VAN	Street Car	AFX Magna-traction Special	Orange (opaque or translucent) body; red windshield; black stripe; black tail lights. Snake stickers included for vans in set #2182 "Venomous Vans."	
1922	1748	1974	DODGE STREET VAN	Street Car	AFX Magna-traction Special	Orange body; red windshield; black tail lights.	
1922	1748	1974	DODGE STREET VAN	Street Car	AFX Magna-traction Special	Yellow body; dark windshield; orange stripe; orange tail lights. Snake stickers included for vans in set #2182 "Venomous Vans."	
1922	1748	1974	DODGE STREET VAN	Street Car	AFX Magna-traction Special	Yellow body; dark windshield.	
1923	1781	1974	ROARIN' ROLLS "GOLDEN GHOST"	Drag Car	Original A/FX Special	White body.	
1923	1781	1974	ROARIN' ROLLS "GOLDEN GHOST"	Drag Car	Original A/FX Special	Black body.	
1923	1781	1974	ROARIN' ROLLS "GOLDEN GHOST"	Drag Car	Original A/FX Special	Yellow (opaque or translucent) body.	
1924	1782	1974	PEACE TANK	Custom Car	AFX Magna-traction Special	Green body (two different shades)	
1925	1791	1974	'31 MODEL "A" FORD PANEL	Street Car	AFX Magna-traction Special	Yellow body.	
1925	1791	1974	'31 MODEL "A" FORD PANEL	Street Car	AFX Magna-traction Special	Blue body.	
1925	1791	1974	'31 MODEL "A" FORD PANEL	Street Car	AFX Magna-traction Special	Orange body.	
1925	1791	1974	'31 MODEL "A" FORD PANEL	Street Car	AFX Magna-traction Special	Lime body (different shades, opaque and translucent).	
1926	1702	1974	GRAND AM	Drag Car	AFX Magna-traction Special	Yellow body; orange details.	
1926	1702	1974	GRAND AM	Drag Car	AFX Magna-traction Special	White body; Red and blue details. Silver painted or unpainted exhaust pipes.	
1926	1702	1974	GRAND AM	Drag Car	AFX Magna-traction Special	Blue body; yellow and red details.	
1927	1703	1974	CORVETTE	Sports Car	AFX Magna-traction	Yellow body; black stripe; silver headlights; painted or unpainted grill; white or silver exhaust pipes.	
1927	1703	1974	CORVETTE	Sports Car	AFX Magna-traction	Yellow body; white stripe; silver headlights; painted grill; white exhaust pipes.	
1927	1703	1974	CORVETTE	Sports Car	AFX Magna-traction	Black body; yellow stripe; silver headlights; silver exhaust pipes.	
1927	1703	1974	CORVETTE	Sports Car	AFX Magna-traction	Blue body; white stripe; silver headlights; silver exhaust pipes.	
1927	1703	1974	CORVETTE	Sports Car	AFX Magna-traction	White body; #7; with or without silver stripe; blue and red stripes; silver headlights; silver exhaust pipes; painted or unpainted grill.	
1927	1703	1974	CORVETTE	Sports Car	AFX Magna-traction	Silver chromed body; baby blue stripe.	
1927	1703	1974	CORVETTE	Sports Car	AFX Magna-traction	Silver chromed body; red stripe.	
1928	1701	1974	MODEL "A" 1930 FORD COUPE	Street Car	AFX Magna-traction Special	Blue body.	
1928	1701	1974	MODEL "A" 1930 FORD COUPE	Street Car	AFX Magna-traction Special	Yellow body.	
1928	1701	1974	MODEL "A" 1930 FORD COUPE	Street Car	AFX Magna-traction Special	Black body.	
1928	1701	1974	MODEL "A" 1930 FORD COUPE	Street Car	AFX Magna-traction Special	Black body; yellow roof	
1929	1704	1974	CHEVELLE STOCKER	Stock Car	AFX Magna-traction	Butterscotch body; #17; red stripes; painted or unpainted window net; with or without headlight lenses.	1974 Chev Stocker
1929	1704	1974	CHEVELLE STOCKER	Stock Car	AFX Magna-traction	White body; #17; orange stripes; with or without headlight lenses.	
1929	1704	1974	CHEVELLE STOCKER	Stock Car	AFX Magna-traction	Orange body; #17 in red; white stripes.	
1930	1930	1975	MATADOR STOCKER	Stock Car	AFX Magna-traction	Orange body; #5; red sides; black top.	
1930	1930	1975	MATADOR STOCKER	Stock Car	AFX Magna-traction	White body; #5; red sides; blue top.	
1931	1931	1975	V. W. THING	Off Road Car	AFX Magna-traction Special	Blue body; white top	
1931	1931	1975	V. W. THING	Off Road Car	AFX Magna-traction Special	Yellow body; black top	
1932	1707	1975	MERCURY STOCKER	Stock Car	AFX Magna-traction	Baby blue body; #31; dark blue stripe, white top.	
1932	1707	1975	MERCURY STOCKER	Stock Car	AFX Magna-traction	White body; #31; orange stripe, black top	
1933	1933	1975	PORSCHE CARRERA	Stock Car	AFX Magna-traction	White body; black and purple stripes; with or without silver detailing on hood.	
1933	1933	1975	PORSCHE CARRERA	Stock Car	AFX Magna-traction	Orange body; black and blue stripes; with or without silver detailing on hood.	
1934	1934	1975	VEGA FUNNY CAR	Drag Car	AFX Magna-traction Special	White body; orange and blue stripes; with or without silver detailing.	
1934	1934	1975	VEGA FUNNY CAR	Drag Car	AFX Magna-traction Special	Orange body; white stripes, with or without silver detailing.	
1935	1935	1976	CAPRI	Sports Car	AFX Magna-traction	Orange body; #13; white sides; maroon hood; with or without silver 13 on hood.	
1935	1935	1976	CAPRI	Sports Car	AFX Magna-traction	Blue body; #13; white sides; black hood; with or without silver 13 on hood.	
1936	1931	1976	VW THING ROADSTER	Off Road Car	AFX Magna-traction Special	Tan body; brown camouflage.	
1936	1931	1976	VW THING ROADSTER	Off Road Car	AFX Magna-traction Special	Lime body; green camouflage.	
1937	1748	1976	DODGE VAN RESCUE VEHICLE	Street Car	AFX Magna-traction Special	Red body	
1937	1748	1976	DODGE VAN RESCUE VEHICLE	Street Car	AFX Magna-traction Special	White body	
1938	1787	1976	MATADOR POLICE VEHICLE	Street Car	AFX Magna-traction	Blue body; With or without silver accents and front spoiler	
1939	1787	1976	MATADOR TAXI	Street Car	AFX Magna-traction	Yellow body; with or without front spoiler.	
1939	1787	1976	MATADOR TAXI	Street Car	AFX Magna-traction	Blue body; with or without front spoiler.	
1939	1787	1976	MATADOR TAXI	Street Car	AFX Magna-traction	White body; with or without front spoiler.	
1941	1941	1976	'56 FORD PICKUP	Street Car	AFX Magna-traction Special	Red body; blue flames.	
1941	1941	1976	'56 FORD PICKUP	Street Car	AFX Magna-traction Special	Black body; yellow flames.	
1942	1942	1976	CUSTOM VAN	Street Car	AFX Magna-traction Special	Orange body; red flames; with or without silver detailing.	
1942	1942	1976	CUSTOM VAN	Street Car	AFX Magna-traction Special	White body; blue flames.	
1943	1943	1976	FORD STREET VAN	Street Car	AFX Magna-traction Special	White body; blue details.	
1943	1943	1976	FORD STREET VAN	Street Car	AFX Magna-traction Special	Black body.	
1943	1943	1976	FORD STREET VAN	Street Car	AFX Magna-traction Special	Tan body; Brown details.	
1944	1737	1976	FORD ESCORT	Street Car	AFX Magna-traction	White body; #46 in red or silver background; red and blue stripes.	
1944	1737	1976	FORD ESCORT	Street Car	AFX Magna-traction	Black body; #46; green and red stripes.	
1945	1748	1976	MATADOR POLICE VEHICLE	Street Car	AFX Magna-traction	White body; With or without silver accents	
1946	1748	1978	POLICE VAN	Street Car	AFX Magna-traction Special	Blue Body.	
1946	1748	1978	POLICE VAN	Street Car	AFX Magna-traction Special	White Body.	
1948	1948	1978	MONZA GT	Sports Car	AFX Magna-traction	White body; #0; green details	
1948	1948	1978	MONZA GT	Sports Car	AFX Magna-traction	Red body; #0; yellow details	
1952	1952	1979	BMW 320i TURBO	Sports Car	AFX Magna-traction	Yellow body; #5; Orange stripes.	
1952	1952	1979	BMW 320i TURBO	Sports Car	AFX Magna-traction	Yellow body; #3; Red and orange stripes; orange net.	
1952	1952	1979	BMW 320i TURBO	Sports Car	AFX Magna-traction	Yellow body; #3; Orange and red stripes; red net.	
1952	1952	1979	BMW 320i TURBO	Sports Car	AFX Magna-traction	White body; #3; blue and red stripes.	
1954	1954	1979	CORVETTE GT	Sports Car	AFX Magna-traction	White body; #6; baby blue and dark blue details; closed headlights.	
1954	1954	1979	CORVETTE GT	Sports Car	AFX Magna-traction	Yellow body; #12; blue and silver stripes; clear or silver headlights.	
1954	1954	1979	CORVETTE GT	Sports Car	AFX Magna-traction	Orange body; #12; red and silver stripes; clear or silver headlights.	
1955	1955	1979	PORSCHE 934 TURBO	Sports Car	AFX Magna-traction	Yellow body; #51; orange and red details.	
1955	1955	1979	PORSCHE 934 TURBO	Sports Car	AFX Magna-traction	Black body; #51; purple and white details.	
1956	1074	1979	THUNDERBIRD STOCKER	Stock Car	AFX Magna-traction	Blue body; #12; white stripes.	
1956	1074	1979	THUNDERBIRD STOCKER	Stock Car	AFX Magna-traction	Orange body; #12; red stripes	
1957	1957	1980	BMW M1 TURBO	Sports Car	AFX Magna-traction	White body; #3; red and blue stripes.	
1957	1957	1980	BMW M1 TURBO	Sports Car	AFX Magna-traction	White body; #11; red and blue stripes.	
1959	1073	1979	DODGE MAGNUM	Stock Car	AFX Magna-traction	Blue body; #8; white and light blue details.	
1959	1073	1979	DODGE MAGNUM	Stock Car	AFX Magna-traction	Butterscotch body; #8; red and black details.	
1961	1772	1974	"DODGE FEVER"	Drag Car	AFX Magna-traction Special	White body; yellow nose; "Dodge Fever" stickers.	
1962	1774	1974	"FURIOUS FUELER"	Drag Car	AFX Magna-traction Special	White body; yellow nose; "Furious Feuler" stickers.	
1963	1772	1974	"AZTEC"	Drag Car	AFX Magna-traction Special	Red body.	
1964	1774	1974	"DYNO-MITE"	Drag Car	AFX Magna-traction Special	White body; blue details.	
1964	1736	1976	FERRARI DAYTONA	Sports Car	AFX Magna-traction	Yellow body; #16; green and black stripes.	
1964	1736	1976	FERRARI DAYTONA	Sports Car	AFX Magna-traction	Red body; #16.	
1965	1953	1979	FIREBIRD	Sports Car	AFX Magna-traction	Red body; gold and black details; gold bird.	
1965	1953	1979	FIREBIRD	Sports Car	AFX Magna-traction	White body; red and black details; red bird.	
1965	1953	1979	FIREBIRD	Sports Car	AFX Magna-traction	Yellow body; black details; red bird.	
1965	1953	1979	FIREBIRD	Sports Car	AFX Magna-traction	Black body; yellow details; red bird.	
1965	1953	1979	FIREBIRD	Sports Car	AFX Magna-traction	Black body; gold details; gold bird.	
1965	1953	1979	FIREBIRD	Sports Car	AFX Magna-traction	Blue body; #9; white and black details.	
1965	1953	1979	FIREBIRD	Sports Car	AFX Magna-traction	White body; #9; blue and black details.	
1968	1968	1981	'57 CORVETTE HARD TOP	Sports Car	AFX Magna-traction	Red body.	
1969	1968	1981	'57 CORVETTE CONVERTIBLE	Sports Car	AFX Magna-traction	Yellow body.	
1970	1773	1981	REBEL CHARGER	Stock Car	AFX Magna-traction	#11 Orange body; Confederate flag painted on hood.	
1971	1971	1981	Fall Guy Pickup Truck	Street Car	AFX Magna-traction	Brown body; "Fall Guy."	
1973	1973	1974	"FLAMETHROWER" PORSCHE 917	Can-Am Car	AFX Magna-traction (lights)	Baby blue body; #2 with orange stripe; detailed nose; open air vent; either clear or dark windshield.	
1973	1973	1974	"FLAMETHROWER" PORSCHE 917	Can-Am Car	AFX Magna-traction (lights)	Yellow body (either opaque or translucent); #2 with blue stripe; detailed or undetailed nose; open or closed air vent; either clear or dark windshield.	
1973	1973	1974	"FLAMETHROWER" PORSCHE 917	Can-Am Car	AFX Magna-traction (lights)	White body; #2 with green stripe; detailed or undetailed nose; open or closed air vent; either clear or dark windshield.	
1973	1973	1974	"FLAMETHROWER" PORSCHE 917	Can-Am Car	AFX Magna-traction (lights)	White body; #2 with purple stripe; detailed nose; open air vent; either clear or dark windshield.	
1974	1974	1974	FLAMETHROWER FERRARI 512M	Can-Am Car	AFX Magna-traction (lights)	Red body; #6; white details; open vent; clear or dark windshield.	
1974	1974	1974	FLAMETHROWER FERRARI 512M	Can-Am Car	AFX Magna-traction (lights)	White body; #6; blue details; open vent; clear or dark windshield.	
1974	1974	1974	FLAMETHROWER FERRARI 512M	Can-Am Car	AFX Magna-traction (lights)	Blue body; #2; white details; open or closed vent; clear or dark windshield; silver painted or unpainted engine.	
1974	1974	1974	FLAMETHROWER FERRARI 512M	Can-Am Car	AFX Magna-traction (lights)	Red body; #2; white details; closed vent; clear or dark windshield; silver or unpainted engine.	
1974	1974	1974	FLAMETHROWER FERRARI 512M	Can-Am Car	AFX Magna-traction (lights)	White body; #2; blue details; open or closed vent; clear or dark windshield.	
1975	1975	1974	FLAMETHROWER CHEVELLE STOCKER	Stock Car	AFX Magna-traction (lights)	Butterscotch body; #17; red stripes; painted or unpainted window net; with or without headlight lenses.	
1975	1975	1974	FLAMETHROWER CHEVELLE STOCKER	Stock Car	AFX Magna-traction (lights)	White body; #17; orange stripes; with or without headlight lenses.	
1975	1975	1974	FLAMETHROWER CHEVELLE STOCKER	Stock Car	AFX Magna-traction (lights)	Orange body; #17 in red; white stripes.	
1975	1975	1974	FLAMETHROWER CHEVELLE STOCKER	Stock Car	AFX Magna-traction (lights)	White body; #29 in red; red and blue stripes.	
1975	1975	1974	FLAMETHROWER CHEVELLE STOCKER	Stock Car	AFX Magna-traction (lights)	Red body; #29 in white; orange and white stripes.	
1976	1976	1974	FLAMETHROWER DODGE CHARGER DAYTONA	Stock Car	AFX Magna-traction (lights)	Yellow body; #7 with or without silver details; blue tinted windshield. Clear headlight lenses.	
1976	1976	1974	FLAMETHROWER DODGE CHARGER DAYTONA	Stock Car	AFX Magna-traction (lights)	Blue body; #7 with or without silver details; clear or blue tinted windshield. Clear headlight lenses.	
1977	1948	1978	FLAMETHROWER MONZA GT	Sports Car	AFX Magna-traction (lights)	White body; #0; green details	
1977	1948	1978	FLAMETHROWER MONZA GT	Sports Car	AFX Magna-traction (lights)	Red body; #0; yellow details	
1978	1756	1978	CAMARO Z-28	Sports Car	AFX Magna-traction (lights)	Baby blue body; #3 with purple stripe; silver grill; clear headlight lenses; blue windshield.	
1978	1756	1978	CAMARO Z-28	Sports Car	AFX Magna-traction (lights)	White body; #6 with red, blue and silver stripes; black grill; clear headlight lenses; blue windshield.	
1979	1979	1979	POLICE CAR	Street Car	AFX Magna-traction (Overhead lights)	White body; blue stripe, hood, and trunk, "Police;" overhead lights either red, blue, clear, or one red and one blue.	
1979	1979	1979	POLICE CAR	Street Car	AFX Magna-traction (Overhead lights)	Yellow body; blue stripe, hood and truck, "Police;" overhead lights blue, clear, or one red and one blue.	
1980	1952	1979	BMW 320i TURBO	Sports Car	AFX Magna-traction (lights)	Yellow body; #5; Orange stripes.	
1980	1952	1979	BMW 320i TURBO	Sports Car	AFX Magna-traction (lights)	Yellow body; #3; Red and orange stripes; orange net.	
1980	1952	1979	BMW 320i TURBO	Sports Car	AFX Magna-traction (lights)	Yellow body; #3; Orange and red stripes; red net.	
1980	1952	1979	BMW 320i TURBO	Sports Car	AFX Magna-traction (lights)	White body; #3; blue and red stripes.	
1981	1953	1979	FIREBIRD	Sports Car	AFX Magna-traction (lights)	Red body; gold and black details; gold bird.	
1981	1953	1979	FIREBIRD	Sports Car	AFX Magna-traction (lights)	White body; red and black details; red bird.	
1981	1953	1979	FIREBIRD	Sports Car	AFX Magna-traction (lights)	Yellow body; black details; red bird.	
1981	1953	1979	FIREBIRD	Sports Car	AFX Magna-traction (lights)	Black body; yellow details; red bird.	
1981	1953	1979	FIREBIRD	Sports Car	AFX Magna-traction (lights)	Black body; gold details; gold bird.	
1982	1982	1979	CORVETTE GT	Sports Car	AFX Magna-traction (lights)	Yellow body; #12; blue and silver stripes; clear or silver headlights.	
1982	1982	1979	CORVETTE GT	Sports Car	AFX Magna-traction (lights)	Orange body; #12; red and silver stripes; clear or silver headlights.	
1984	1959	1980	CHEVY BLAZER	Street Car	AFX Magna-traction (lights)	Black body; white, light blue and dark blue details.	
1984	1959	1980	CHEVY BLAZER	Street Car	AFX Magna-traction (lights)	White body; red, orange, and yellow details.	
1986	1979	1979	CHEVY FIRECHIEF CAR	Street Car	AFX Magna-traction (Overhead lights)	White body; red stripe; "Chief;" overhead lights either clear, red, or one red and one blue.	
1987	1962	1980	JEEP CJ7	Street Car	AFX Magna-traction (lights)	Baby blue body; black roof.	
1987	1962	1980	JEEP CJ7	Street Car	AFX Magna-traction (lights)	Red body; black roof.	
1988	1979	1979	SHERIFF	Street Car	AFX Magna-traction (Overhead lights)	White body; red stripe, hood, and trunk; "Sheriff."	
1050	1979	1979	STATE POLICE	Street Car	AFX Magna-traction (Overhead lights)	White body; blue and yellow stripes; "State Police."	
1051	1979	1979	RESCUE	Street Car	AFX Magna-traction (Overhead lights)	White body; orange sides, hood, and trunk; "Rescue."	
1052	1979	1979	Royal Canadian Mounted Police	Street Car	AFX Magna-traction (Overhead lights)	Blue body.	
1155	1156	1979	PETERBILT SLEEPER CAB WITH SHELL TANKER	Street Car	AFX Magna-Traction	Yellow body; red and white stripes; "Shell" stickers; silver or yellow tanker; "Shell."	
1156	1156	1979	PETERBILT W/AFX EXPRESS TRLR.	Street Car	AFX Magna-Traction (Lights)	Red body; yellow and orange stripes; silver trailer "AFX Express."	
1156	1156	1979	PETERBILT W/AFX EXPRESS TRLR.	Street Car	AFX Magna-Traction (Lights)	White body; red and blue stripes; silver trailer "AFX Express"	
1156	1156	1979	PETERBILT W/AFX EXPRESS TRLR.	Street Car	AFX Magna-Traction (Lights)	Yellow body; orange and red details; "AFX Express."	
1156	1156	1979	PETERBILT W/AFX EXPRESS TRLR.	Street Car	AFX Magna-Traction (Lights)	White body; yellow and red details.	
1157	1156	1979	PETERBILT SLEEPER CAB WITH AURORA TRAILER	Street Car	AFX Magna-Traction	White body; red and blue stripes; silver trailer; "AURORA" or "AFX Express."	
1157	1156	1979	PETERBILT SLEEPER CAB WITH AURORA TRAILER	Street Car	AFX Magna-Traction	White body; light blue and dark blue details; "Aurora Racing Team."	
1157	1156	1979	PETERBILT SLEEPER CAB WITH AURORA TRAILER	Street Car	AFX Magna-Traction	White body; yellow and red details.	
6275	1156	1979	PETERBILT / CONVOY TRUCK	Street Car	Speed-Steer	Yellow body; red and orange details; silver trailer "AFX Express."	
6275	1156	1979	PETERBILT / CONVOY TRUCK	Street Car	Speed-Steer	White body; light blue and dark blue details; silver trailer "CONVOY."	
6275	1156	1979	PETERBILT / CONVOY TRUCK	Street Car	Speed-Steer	Red body; white and orange stripes; silver trailer "AFX Express."	
6276	1156	1979	PETERBILT / CHALLENGE TRUCK	Street Car	Speed-Steer	Yellow body; silver trailer "CHALLENGE."	
6276	1156	1979	PETERBILT / CHALLENGE TRUCK	Street Car	Speed-Steer	White body; light blue and dark blue details; silver trailer "CHALLENGE" or "Aurora Racing Team."	
6276	1156	1979	PETERBILT / CHALLENGE TRUCK	Street Car	Speed-Steer	Yellow body; red and orange details; "CHALLENGE."	
6278		1980	GMC ASTRO	Street Car	Speed-Steer	White body; orange, red, and blue stripes.	
6278		1980	GMC ASTRO	Street Car	Speed-Steer	Red body; yellow, red, and orange stripes; "Shell" stickers; silver tanker "Shell."	
6278		1980	GMC ASTRO	Street Car	Speed-Steer	Black body; orange, red, and white stripes; "Aurora" or "CONVOY" trailer.	
1158		1980	GMC ASTRO 95 WITH SHELL TANKER	Street Car	AFX Magna-Traction (Lights)	Yellow body; red and white details; silver chromed or yellow tanker; "Shell."	
1159		1979	GMC ASTRO 95 WITH AFX TRAILER	Street Car	AFX Magna-Traction (Lights)	Red body; orange and yellow details; Silver trailer "AFX Express."	
1162		1980	GMC ASTRO	Street Car	AFX Magna-Traction (Lights)	Black body; orange, red, and white stripes.	
1162		1980	GMC ASTRO	Street Car	AFX Magna-Traction (Lights)	White body; Green and blue details; silver trailer "Aurora."	
1163	1156	1979	PETERBILT SLEEPER CAB WITH RACING TEAM TRAILER	Street Car	AFX Magna-Traction (Lights)	Red body; yellow and orange stripes; silver trailer "Aurora AFX," "Ferrari," "Lotus," or "Goodyear" stickers.	
1163	1156	1979	PETERBILT SLEEPER CAB WITH RACING TEAM TRAILER	Street Car	AFX Magna-Traction (Lights)	White body; red and blue stripes; silver trailer "Aurora AFX," "Ferrari," "Lotus," or "Goodyear" stickers.	
1163	1156	1979	PETERBILT SLEEPER CAB WITH RACING TEAM TRAILER	Street Car	AFX Magna-Traction (Lights)	White body; light blue and dark blue details; "Aurora AFX," "Ferrari," "Lotus," or "Goodyear" stickers.	
1165	1156	1979	PETERBILT	Street Car	G-Plus	Red body; yellow and orange stripes; silver trailer "AFX Express."	
1165	1156	1979	PETERBILT	Street Car	G-Plus	White body; red and blue stripes; silver trailer "AFX Express."	
1165	1156	1979	PETERBILT	Street Car	G-Plus	White body; red and yellow stripes.	
1186	1156	1983	PETERBILT FIRE TRUCK	Street Car	AFX Magna-Traction (Lights)	Never Released	
None	1773	1976	PETTY DODGE CHARGER	Stock Car	G-Plus	Baby blue body; #43 "STP"; Red and white stripes. Special promotion featuring the car of Richard Petty.	
1715	1735	1976	INDY SPECIAL	Formula 1 Car	G-Plus	Gold chromed body; #1; red, yellow, and orange stripes.	
1716	1731	1976	LOLA T-330	Formula 1 Car	G-Plus	Silver chromed body; #7; orange and blue details.	
1716	1731	1976	LOLA T-330	Formula 1 Car	G-Plus	White body; #7; blue details; either grey or chromed mirrors.	
1717	1957	1980	BMW M1	Sports Car	G-Plus	White body; red and blue stripes; #3.	
1718	1783	1981	MADOM LOTUS	Formula 1 Car	G-Plus	Yellow body; #3.	
1731	1731	1976	LOLA T-330	Formula 1 Car	G-Plus	Yellow body; #7; red details; either grey or chromed mirrors; with or without stickers.	
1731	1731	1976	LOLA T-330	Formula 1 Car	G-Plus	Blue body; #7; white details; either grey or chromed mirrors.	
1731	1731	1976	LOLA T-330	Formula 1 Car	G-Plus	Red body; white details; either grey or chromed mirrors.	
1731	1731	1976	LOLA T-330	Formula 1 Car	G-Plus	Green body; blue details; either grey or chromed mirrors.	
1731	1731	1976	LOLA T-330	Formula 1 Car	G-Plus	Baby blue body; blue details; either grey or chromed mirrors.	
1732	1732	1976	FERRARI 312 PB	Can-Am Car	G-Plus	Red body; yellow stripe.	
1733	1733	1976	McLAREN F-1	Formula 1 Car	G-Plus	White body; #11 in pink; pink top; air scoop; clear or yellow windshield.	
1733	1733	1976	McLAREN F-1	Formula 1 Car	G-Plus	White body; #11 in pink; pink top; no air scoop; clear or yellow windshield.	
1733	1733	1976	McLAREN F-1	Formula 1 Car	G-Plus	White body; #11 in black; red top; air scoop; clear or yellow windshield.	
1734	1734	1976	FERRARI F-1	Formula 1 Car	G-Plus	Red body; #6; white details; clear or yellow windshield.	
1735	1735	1976	INDY SPECIAL	Formula 1 Car	G-Plus	Black body; #1; red, yellow, and orange stripes.	
1735	1735	1976	INDY SPECIAL	Formula 1 Car	G-Plus	White body; #1; red, yellow, and orange stripes.	
1736	1736	1976	FERRARI DAYTONA	Sports Car	G-Plus	Yellow body; #16; with or without green and black stripes.	
1736	1736	1976	FERRARI DAYTONA	Sports Car	G-Plus	Red body; #16.	
1737	1737	1976	"RALLYE" FORD ESCORT	Off-road Car	G-Plus	Green body; #28 either clear or paper stickers; yellow and blue stripes.	
1738	none	1977	TYRRELL F-1	Formula 1 Car	G-Plus	Blue body; #4 painted or paper sticker; air scoop; "elf" painted or paper sticker.	
1738	none	1977	TYRRELL F-1	Formula 1 Car	G-Plus	Blue body; #4 painted or paper sticker; no air scoop; "elf" painted or paper sticker.	
1739	1775	1976	DATSUN 240Z	Sports Car	G-Plus	Red body; #17 in black on white paper stickers or stenciled; white and orange details.	
1740		1980	F-1 FERRARI T4	Formula 1 Car	G-Plus	Red (different shades) body; #2; clear or blue windshield.	
1742	1935	1976	CAPRI	Sports Car	G-Plus	White body; #21; green and blue stripes.	
1743	1786	1976	PORSCHE 510K	Can-Am Car	G-Plus	White body; #6; orange driver; blue maroon, and yellow details "auto world"	
1743	1786	1976	PORSCHE 510K	Can-Am Car	G-Plus	White body; #6; yellow driver; blue maroon, and yellow details "auto world"	
1744	1768	1976	SHADOW	Can-Am Car	G-Plus	White body; #3; blue driver; yellow, orange, and red stripes.	
1744	1768	1976	SHADOW	Can-Am Car	G-Plus	Black body; #3; blue driver; yellow, orange, and red stripes.	
1745	1733	1976	F-1 AURORA "AFX"	Formula 1 Car	G-Plus	Yellow body; #1; blue top; air scoop; various stickers.	
1745	1733	1976	F-1 AURORA "AFX"	Formula 1 Car	G-Plus	Yellow body; #1; blue top; no air scoop; various stickers.	
1781	1955	1979	LE MANS PORSCHE	Sports Car	G-Plus	Yellow body; #31; orange and brown stripes.	
1783	1783	1979	MARIO ANDRETTI LOTUS	Formula 1 Car	G-Plus	Black body; #1; yellow stripes.	
1784	1768	1980	SHADOW	Formula 1 Car	G-Plus	White body; #3; blue driver, red and blue stripes.	
1785	1785	1982	F-1 LIGIER	Formula 1 Car	G-Plus	Blue body; #26; white and red details; "Ligier."	
1787	1787	1980	SAUDI WILLIAMS F-1	Formula 1 Car	G-Plus	White body; #1; green top.	
1788	1788	1980	F-1 RENAULT	Formula 1 Car	G-Plus	Yellow (opaque or translucent) body; #15; white details.	
1789	1735	1976	FOYT INDY SPECIAL	Formula 1 Car	G-Plus	Orange body; #14 painted or paper sticker.	
1791	none	1977	F-1 SIX WHEELER	Formula 1 Car	G-Plus	Blue body; #4; white top; no air scoop; "First national city."	
1792	none	1980	POLIFAC BMW	Formula 1 Car	G-Plus	White body; #8; red, purple, and blue stripes; "Polifac."	
1793	1783	1983	ESSEX LOTUS 81	Formula 1 Car	G-Plus	Blue body; #11; blue and white stripes in either paper or foil stickers.	
1794	1783	1983	CANDY TYRELL	Formula 1 Car	G-Plus	Red body; #3; blue details.	
1795	1948	1978	MONZA GT	Sports Car	G-Plus	Black body; #25; tan, orange, and red details.	
1796	1735	1978	INDY SPECIAL	Formula 1 Car	G-Plus	Red body; #16; yellow, orange, and white stripes.	
1797	1930	1976	FORD GT	Stock Car	G-Plus	White body; painted blue stripes; #5 Matador Stocker	
1798	1952	1979	BMW 320i TURBO	Sports Car	G-Plus	Red body; #9; blue, dark blue, and white stripes.	
1823	1948	1978	MONZA GT	Sports Car	G-Plus	Black body; #25; tan, orange, and red details.	
1823	1948	1978	MONZA GT	Sports Car	G-Plus	Red body; #0; yellow details	
1824	1952	1979	BMW 320i TURBO	Sports Car	G-Plus	White body; #3; blue and red stripes.	
1824	1952	1979	BMW 320i TURBO	Sports Car	G-Plus	White body; blue and red stripes; angled 3 on roof.	
1826	1955	1979	PORSCHE TURBO RSR	Sports Car	G-Plus	Yellow body; #51; orange and red details.	
1827	1731	1976	LOLA T-330	Formula 1 Car	G-Plus	White body; international colors sticker package.	
1828	1935	1976	FORD CAPRI	Sports Car	G-Plus	White body; international colors sticker package.	
1829	1733	1983	AURORA AFX F1	Formula 1 Car	G-Plus	Yellow body; #1; blue top; air scoop; various stickers.	
1829	1733	1983	AURORA AFX F1	Formula 1 Car	G-Plus	Yellow body; #1; blue top; no air scoop; various stickers.	
1835	none	1980	Aurora Citizen Formula Pacific	Formula 1 Car	G-Plus	Blue body; #1; yellow details; "Citizen Watches."	
1836	1787	1983	SALAZAR WILLIAMS	Formula 1 Car	G-Plus	White body; #8 "Data bin"	
1837	1787	1982	McLaren M29	Formula 1 Car	G-Plus	White body; #7 "Watson"	
1838	1957	1980	BMW PRO CAR	Sports Car	G-Plus	White body; #9; red and black stripes; "Valvoline."	
1875	1953	1980	FIREBIRD	Sports Car	AFX Magna-traction (lights)	Blue body; #9; white and black details.	
1876	1957	1980	BMW Turbo	Sports Car	AFX Magna-traction (lights)	Yellow body; #5; Orange stripes	
1879	1973	1978	PORSCHE 917	Can-Am Car	AFX Magna-traction (lights)	White body; #2 with baby blue stripes; closed air vent; dark windshield.	
1880	1974	1978	FERRARI 512M	Can-Am Car	AFX Magna-traction (lights)	White body; #6; yellow driver; blue maroon, and yellow details "auto world"	
3001	1747	1977	PORSCHE 917-10	Can-Am Car	Ultra 5	White body; #11; blue, green, and yellow stripes; "Heuer" and "Goodyear."	
3002	1786	1977	PORSCHE 510K	Can-Am Car	Ultra 5	White body; #6; yellow driver; blue maroon, and yellow details "auto world"	
3005	1930	1977	MATADOR STOCKER	Stock Car	Ultra 5	White body; #1; yellow and red details.	
3006	1707	1977	MERCURY STOCKER	Stock Car	Ultra 5	White body; #2; red and blue stripes.	
3007	1768	1977	SHADOW	Can-Am Car	Ultra 5	White body; #3; blue driver; yellow, orange, and red stripes.	
3007	1768	1977	SHADOW	Can-Am Car	Ultra 5	Black body; #3; blue driver; yellow, orange, and red stripes.	
3007	1768	1977	SHADOW	Can-Am Car	Ultra 5	White body; #3; blue driver; yellow and orange stripes.	
3008	1767	1977	LOLA T-260	Can-Am Car	Ultra 5	#39 White body; Green, blue, and yellow details.	
1101	1773	1978	DODGE STOCK CAR	Stock Car	Super Magna-traction	Yellow body; #11 in red; black window net; green windshield.	
1101	1773	1978	DODGE STOCK CAR	Stock Car	Super Magna-traction	Butterscotch body; #11 in red; unpainted window net; green windshield.	
1101	1773	1978	DODGE STOCK CAR	Stock Car	Super Magna-traction	Gold chromed body; #11 in red; blue hood; green windshield.	
1102	1764	1978	JAVELIN	Street Car	Super Magna-traction	Chromed Body; #5; Red and Blue details.	
1102K	1764	1979	JAVELIN KIT	Street Car	Original A/FX	Chromed Body; #5; Red and Blue details. Boxed kit of Original A/FX chassis parts to be assembled by buyer.	
1103	1737	1978	ESCORT	Street Car	Super Magna-traction	Gold chromed body; #46; red and blue stripes.	
1104	1775	1978	DATSUN 240Z	Sports Car	Super Magna-traction	Red body; #46; white sides; red stripes; blue windshield.	
1104	1775	1978	DATSUN 240Z	Sports Car	Super Magna-traction	Silver chromed body; #46; blue sides, white stripes.	
1105	1786	1978	PORSCHE 510K "CAN-AM"	Can-Am Car	Super Magna-traction	White body; #6; yellow driver; blue maroon, and yellow details "auto world"	
1105	1786	1978	PORSCHE 510K "CAN-AM"	Can-Am Car	Super Magna-traction	Gold chromed body; #4; with orange stripes.	
1106	1768	1978	SHADOW	Can-Am Car	Super Magna-traction	Gold chromed body; #3; blue driver, red stripe.	
1106	1768	1978	SHADOW	Can-Am Car	Super Magna-traction	White body; #3; blue driver; yellow, orange, and red stripes.	
1106	1768	1978	SHADOW	Can-Am Car	Super Magna-traction	Black body; #3; blue driver; yellow, orange, and red stripes.	
1107	1708	1978	'55 CHEVY BEL AIR	Street Car	Super Magna-traction	Orange (opaque or translucent) body; silver or white exhaust pipes; blue windshield; red or unpainted tail lights.	
1107	1708	1978	'55 CHEVY BEL AIR	Street Car	Super Magna-traction	Gold chromed (different shades) body; #28; blue glass; "Shell" and "Goodyear" stickers.	
1107	1708	1978	'55 CHEVY BEL AIR	Street Car	Super Magna-traction	Copper chromed (different shades) body; #28; blue glass; "Shell" and "Goodyear" stickers.	
1107	1708	1978	'55 CHEVY BEL AIR	Street Car	Super Magna-traction	Red chromed body; #28; blue glass; "Shell" and "Goodyear" stickers.	
1108	1760	1978	'57 CHEVY NOMAD	Street Car	Super Magna-traction	Chromed red body; #21 stickers; red windshield.	
1108	1760	1978	'57 CHEVY NOMAD	Street Car	Super Magna-traction	Chromed silver body; #21 stickers; red windshield.	
1108	1760	1978	'57 CHEVY NOMAD	Street Car	Super Magna-traction	Chromed purple body; #21 stickers; red windshield.	
1108	1760	1978	'57 CHEVY NOMAD	Street Car	Super Magna-traction	Chromed light purple body; #21 stickers; red windshield.	
1108	1760	1978	'57 CHEVY NOMAD	Street Car	Super Magna-traction	Chromed green body; #21 stickers; red windshield.	
1108	1760	1978	'57 CHEVY NOMAD	Street Car	Super Magna-traction	Chromed blue body; #21 stickers; red windshield.	
1108	1760	1978	'57 CHEVY NOMAD	Street Car	Super Magna-traction	Red body; red windshield.	
1108	1760	1978	'57 CHEVY NOMAD	Street Car	Super Magna-traction	White body; red windshield.	
None	1930	1978	MATADOR STOCK CAR	Stock Car	Super Magna-traction	White body; #1; yellow and red details.	
None	1767	1978	LOLA T-260	Can-Am Car	Super Magna-traction	#39 White body; Green, blue, and yellow details.	
1062	1762	1978	PLYMOUTH ROAD RUNNER	Stock Car	AFX Magna-Sonic	Blue body; #43, red top and blue nose	
1062	1762	1978	PLYMOUTH ROAD RUNNER	Stock Car	AFX Magna-Sonic	Baby blue body; #30; blue sides; chrome nose; dark windshield.	
1062	1762	1978	PLYMOUTH ROAD RUNNER	Stock Car	AFX Magna-Sonic	Yellow body; #30; orange sides; #30 on roof either brown or orange.	
1063	1773	1978	DODGE STOCK CAR	Stock Car	AFX Magna-Sonic	Yellow body; #11 in red; black window net; green windshield.	
1063	1773	1978	DODGE STOCK CAR	Stock Car	AFX Magna-Sonic	Butterscotch body; #11 in red; unpainted window net; green windshield.	
1063	1773	1978	DODGE STOCK CAR	Stock Car	AFX Magna-Sonic	Blue body; 91; orange stripes (never released).	
1064	1708	1978	'55 CHEVY BEL AIR	Street Car	AFX Magna-Sonic	Blue body; silver exhaust pipes; blue windshield; unpainted tail lights.	
1064	1708	1978	'55 CHEVY BEL AIR	Street Car	AFX Magna-Sonic	Black body; dark windshield; painted yellow (opaque or translucent) flames; unpainted tail lights.	
1064	1708	1978	'55 CHEVY BEL AIR	Street Car	AFX Magna-Sonic	White body; dark windshield; painted red flames; unpainted tail lights.	
1065	1778	1978	BAJA BUG	Off Road Car	AFX Magna-Sonic	Red body; blue windshield; white gas tanks.	
1065	1778	1978	BAJA BUG	Off Road Car	AFX Magna-Sonic	Red body; blue windshield; black gas tanks.	
1066	1787	1978	MATADOR STOCK CAR	Stock Car	AFX Magna-Sonic	(never released)	
1067	1704	1978	CHEVELLE STOCK CAR	Stock Car	AFX Magna-Sonic	Orange body; #17 in red; white stripes.	
1067	1704	1978	CHEVELLE STOCK CAR	Stock Car	AFX Magna-Sonic	White body; #29 in red; red and blue stripes.	
1067	1704	1978	CHEVELLE STOCK CAR	Stock Car	AFX Magna-Sonic	Red body; #29 in white; orange and white stripes.	
1069	1764	1978	JAVELIN	Sports Car	AFX Magna-Sonic	Red body; #5 White stripes	
1069	1764	1978	JAVELIN	Sports Car	AFX Magna-Sonic	White body; #21 Yellow, orange, and red stripes. #21 painted in either yellow or butterscotch.	
1069	1764	1978	JAVELIN	Sports Car	AFX Magna-Sonic	Black body; #21 Dark blue, light blue and white stripes.	
1070	1935	1978	CAPRI	Sports Car	AFX Magna-Sonic	(never released)	
1071	1776	1978	DATSUN 510	Street Car	AFX Magna-Sonic	Yellow body; #46; orange sides with yellow stripes.	
1071	1776	1978	DATSUN 510	Street Car	AFX Magna-Sonic	Blue body; #46; white sides with blue stripes.	
1071	1776	1978	DATSUN 510	Street Car	AFX Magna-Sonic	Red body; #46; white sides with red stripes.	
1072	1737	1978	ESCORT	Street Car	AFX Magna-Sonic	Baby blue body; #46; blue and white stripes.	
1073	1073	1979	DODGE MAGNUM STOCK CAR	Stock Car	AFX Magna-Sonic	Blue body; #8; white and light blue details.	
1073	1073	1979	DODGE MAGNUM STOCK CAR	Stock Car	AFX Magna-Sonic	Butterscotch body; #8; red and black details.	
1074	1074	1979	THUNDERBIRD STOCKER	Stock Car	AFX Magna-Sonic	Blue body; #12; white stripes.	
1074	1074	1979	THUNDERBIRD STOCKER	Stock Car	AFX Magna-Sonic	Orange body; #12; red stripes	
2010	5788	1982	"TOO MUCH" ORION LAZER 2000	Stock Car	G-Plus	White body; green and yellow stripes; "Orion."	
2011	5788	1982	"TOO MUCH" SATURN LAZER 2000	Stock Car	G-Plus	White body; purple stripes; "Saturn."	
2012	5787	1982	"TURBO TURNON" ODYSSEY LAZER 2000	Stock Car	G-Plus	White body; red stripes; "Odyssey."	
2013	5787	1982	"TURBO TURNON" STARFIRE LAZER 2000	Stock Car	G-Plus	White body; blue stripes; "Starfire."	
6200	1953	1979	FIREBIRD	Sports Car	Speed Steer	White body; red and black details; red bird.	
6200	1953	1979	FIREBIRD	Sports Car	Speed Steer	Blue body; #9; white and black details.	
6200	1953	1979	FIREBIRD	Sports Car	Speed Steer	White body; #9; blue and black details.	
6201	1952	1979	BMW 320i TURBO	Sports Car	Speed Steer	Yellow body; #5; Orange stripes	
6202	1954	1979	CORVETTE GT	Sports Car	Speed Steer	White body; #6; baby blue and dark blue details; closed headlights.	
6203	1955	1979	PORSCHE TURBO	Sports Car	Speed Steer	White body; #81; orange stripes.	
6203	1955	1979	PORSCHE TURBO	Sports Car	Speed Steer	Yellow body; #81; blue stripes.	
6204	1074	1979	THUNDERBIRD STOCKER	Stock Car	Speed Steer	White body; #20; blue, yellow, and green details.	
6205	1073	1979	MAGNUM STK CAR	Stock Car	Speed Steer	Red body; #14; white, yellow, and orange stripes.	
6206	1959	1980	BLAZER	Street Car	Speed Steer	White body; orange and red flames.	
6207	1962	1980	JEEP CJ7	Off Road Car	Speed Steer	Yellow body; orange details, black roof.	
6208	1768	1980	SHADOW	Can-Am Car	Speed Steer	White body; #3; blue driver; yellow, orange, and red stripes	
6209	1979	1980	SHERIFF	Street Car	Speed Steer	White body; red sides, roof, and trunk; "Sheriff."	
6211	1953	1980	FIREBIRD	Sports Car	Speed Steer	Blue body; #9; white and black details.	
6213	1962	1980	JEEP CJ7	Off Road Car	Speed Steer	Baby blue body; black roof.	
6290	1707	1980	MERCURY ROAD BLOCKER	Stock Car	Speed Steer (Road Blocker)	Purple Chromed (different shades) body; #17.	
6291	1737	1980	ESCORT ROAD BLOCKER	Street Car	Speed Steer (Road Blocker)	Purple chromed (different shades) body; #21.	
6291	1737	1980	ESCORT ROAD BLOCKER	Street Car	Speed Steer (Road Blocker)	Copper/red chromed body; #21.	
6291	1737	1980	ESCORT ROAD BLOCKER	Street Car	Speed Steer (Road Blocker)	Gold chromed body; #21.	
1010	1953	1981	FIREBIRD	Sports Car	Blazin' Brakes (lights)	White body; #2; light blue and dark blue details; white bird.	
1011	1954	1981	CORVETTE GT	Sports Car	Blazin' Brakes (lights)	White body #3; yellow, orange, and red details; clear or silver headlights.	
1012	1948	1981	MONZA GT	Sports Car	Blazin' Brakes (lights)	White body; #5; blue, red, and orange stripes.	
1013	1955	1981	PORSCHE 934 TURBO	Sports Car	Blazin' Brakes (lights)	Red body; #7; yellow, white, and orange stripes.	
1020	1959	1981	CHEVY BLAZER	Street Car	Cat's Eyes (lights)	Black body; white, light blue and dark blue details.	
1021	1962	1981	CJ7 JEEP	Off Road Car	Cat's Eyes (lights)	Red body; black roof.	
1022	1954	1981	CORVETTE GT	Sports Car	Cat's Eyes (lights)	Yellow body; #12; blue and silver stripes; clear or silver headlights.	
1023	1756	1981	CAMARO Z-28 "TRANS-AM"	Sports Car	Cat's Eyes (lights)	White body; #6 with red, blue and silver stripes; black grill; clear headlight lenses; blue windshield.	
1801	1785	1981	F-1 LIGIER	Formula 1 Car	Speed Shifter	Blue body; #26; white and red details; "Ligier."	
1802		1981	F-1 FERRARI T4	Formula 1 Car	Speed Shifter	Red (different shades) body; #2; clear or blue glass.	
1803	1957	1981	BMW M1 TURBO	Sports Car	Speed Shifter	White body; #3; red and blue stripes.	
1804	1955	1981	PORSCHE 934 TURBO	Sports Car	Speed Shifter	Yellow body; #51; orange and red details.	
1810	1156	1981	PETERBILT	Street Car	Speed Shifter	White body; red and yellow stripes.	
1810	1156	1981	PETERBILT	Street Car	Speed Shifter	Red body; white and orange stripes.	
8001	1156	1982	Big Ryder Cab (PETERBILT)	Street Car	Magna-Traction (lights)	Yellow body; "RYDER" stickers.	
8002		1982	Big Ryder Cab (GMC ASTRO)	Street Car	Magna-Traction (lights)	Yellow body; "RYDER" stickers.	
8080	1156	1982	Big Ryder Cab with Trailer (PETERBILT)	Street Car	Magna-Traction (lights)	Yellow body; "RYDER" stickers; Yellow trailer "RYDER."	
1990	1775	1982	DATSUN 280Z	Sports Car	SP1000	Silver chromed body; #46; blue sides, white stripes.	
1992	1736	1982	FERRARI DAYTONA	Sports Car	SP1000	Yellow body; #16; green and black stripes.	
1992	1736	1982	FERRARI DAYTONA	Sports Car	SP1000	Red body; #16.	
1993	1957	1982	BMW M1 TURBO	Sports Car	SP1000	White body; #3; red and blue stripes.	
1993	1957	1982	BMW M1 TURBO	Sports Car	SP1000	White body; #9; red and black stripes; "Valvoline."	
1994	1935	1982	ALITALIA CAPRI	Sports Car	SP1000	White body; green and red details "Alitalia" sticker.	
1997	1737	1982	"RALLYE" FORD ESCORT	Off Road Car	SP1000	White body; #3; blue, yellow, and red stripes.	
2804	1074	1982	THUNDERBIRD STOCKER	Stock Car	Super G-Plus	White body; #20; orange, red, and yellow details (never released)	
2805	1073	1982	DODGE MAGNUM	Stock Car	Super G-Plus	White body; #14 blue, red, orange stripes (never released)	
2815	1735	1982	INDY SPECIAL	Formula 1 Car	Super G-Plus	Gold chromed body; #1; yellow, orange, and white stripes.	
2816	1731	1982	LOLA T-330	Formula 1 Car	Super G-Plus	Chromed body; #7; orange and blue details.	
2837	1733	1982	McLAREN F-1	Formula 1 Car	Super G-Plus	White body; #11; pink top; "Marlboro."	
2840		1982	F-1 FERRARI T4	Formula 1 Car	Super G-Plus	Red (different shades) body; #2; clear or blue glass.	
2845	1733	1982	AURORA AFX F1	Formula 1 Car	Super G-Plus	Yellow body; #1; blue top; air scoop; various stickers.	
2845	1733	1982	AURORA AFX F1	Formula 1 Car	Super G-Plus	Yellow body; #1; blue top; no air scoop; various stickers.	
2883	1783	1982	MARIO ANDRETTI LOTUS	Formula 1 Car	Super G-Plus	Black body; #1; yellow stripes.	
2887	1787	1983	SAUDI WILLIAMS F-1	Formula 1 Car	Super G-Plus	White body; #1; green top.	
2888	1788	1983	RENAULT F-1	Formula 1 Car	Super G-Plus	Yellow (opaque or translucent) body; #15; white details.	
2891	none	1983	SIX WHEEL ELF	Formula 1 Car	Super G-Plus	Blue body; #4; white top; no air scoop; "First national city."	
2893	1783	1983	ESSEX LOTUS 81	Formula 1 Car	Super G-Plus	Blue body; #11; blue and white stripes in either paper or foil stickers.	
2894	1783	1983	CANDY TYRELL	Formula 1 Car	Super G-Plus	Red body; #3; blue details.	
5635	none	1983	FALLER a.m.s. team	Formula 1 Car	Super G-Plus	Black body; #1; yellow top; "Faller."	
3400	1962	1983	Jeep CJ7 "M*A*S*H"	Off Road Car	AFX Magnatraction	Never released	
3401	1959	1983	BLAZER "M*A*S*H"	Street Car	AFX Magnatraction	Never released	

== List of Aurora/AFX Slot Car Sets (1971-1983) ==
Note: Vehicles pictured on the set packaging were not necessarily the vehicles included; exceptions being themed sets such as those featuring police cars, tractor-trailer rigs, lighted cars, or a specific make or style of car.

Part #	Year	Description	Cars Pictured	Car Chassis	Length (in feet)	Notes	Photo
1327	1971	"CALIFORNIA OVAL"	XLR McLaren; Too Much	Original A/FX	16'		
1328	1971	"PIT ROW SPECIAL" RACE SET	Turbo Turnon; XLR McLaren	Original A/FX	18'		
1329	1971	"MONZA TWIN" RACE SET	Too Much; Camaro Z-28	Original A/FX	22'		
1331	1971	"RALLY WHIP" RACE SET	Porsche 612; XLR McLaren	Original A/FX			
1332	1971	"MONSTER" FOUR LANE RACE SET	Dodge Charger Daytona; Too Much; Turbo Turnon; Ferrari 612	Original A/FX	22'		
1608	1971	#1608 Aurora A/FX Model Motoring		Original A/FX			
1616	1971	"LOOP-N-BANK"		Original A/FX			
1626	1971	#1626 Aurora A/FX Model Motoring	Camaro Z-28; Dodge Charger Daytona	Original A/FX			
1627	1971	#1627 Aurora A/FX Model Motoring	Turbo Turnon; XLR McLaren	Original A/FX			
1628	1971	#1628 Aurora A/FX Model Motoring	XLR McLaren; Porsche 917	Original A/FX			
1629	1971	"RALLY 300" RACE SET		Thunder-Jet			
1645	1971	"NITE 'N DAY 24 HOUR" RACE SET		Original A/FX	20'		
1648	1971	"FUNNY CAR" RACE SET	'57 Chevy Nomad; Pinto Funny Car	Original A/FX	24'	Packaged for Montgomery Ward	
1650	1971	"FLYING TURNS" RACE SET	XLR McLaren; Porsche 612	Original A/FX		Packaged for Montgomery Ward	
1649	1971	GOLDEN GATE RACE SET	Camaro Z-28; Turbo Turnon	Original A/FX		Packaged for Montgomery Ward	
1656	1971	"MONZA TWIST"		Original A/FX			
1696	1971	"RALLY TWISTER"		Original A/FX			
1664	1971	"STOCK RACERS" RACE SET	Camaro Z-28; Dodge Charger Daytona	Original A/FX			
1667	1971	"TWIN BANKS" RACE SET	Porsche 917; XLR McLaren	Original A/FX	26'		
1668	1971	"FOUR-TWO SPECIAL" RACE SET	Too Much; Turbo Turnon; Porsche 612; XLR McLaren	Original A/FX			
2005	1971	"CORKSCREW RACEWAY"	Turbo Turnon; XLR McLaren	Original A/FX			
2010	1971	"BIG PIT" RACE SET	Ferrari 612; XLR McLaren	Original A/FX			
2014	1971	"SPA PIT KIT RACEWAY"		Original A/FX			
2039	1971	"CYCLONE FLAMETHROWER" RACE SET	Porsche 917; Ferrari 512M	Original A/FX (lights)			
	1972	"ELDORADO 100" RACE SET	Vega Van Gasser; Ford Pinto Funny Car	Original A/FX	20' 6"		
	1972	"TROPHY DASH 500" RACE SET	Javelin Pro Stocker; Pinto Funny Car	Original A/FX			
1308	1972	"RALLY 500" RACE SET	Datsun 240Z; Datsun 510	Original A/FX		Datsun promotional set	
1308	1972	"RALLY 500" RACE SET	Pinto Funny Car; Dodge Charger Daytona	Original A/FX			
1330	1972	"24 HOURS OF LeMANS" "FLAMETHROWER" RACE SET	Porsche 917; Ferrari 512M	Original A/FX (lights)			
1338	1972	"DAYTONA S" RACE SET		Original A/FX			
1339	1972	"ROAD AMERICANA" RACE SET	Vega Van Gasser; Plymouth Cuda Funny Car	Original A/FX			
1340	1972	"MONZA SPIDER" RACE SET	Ferrari 512M; XLR McLaren	Original A/FX			
1341	1972	"FIRECRACKER FOUR" RACE SET	Ferrari 512M; Porsche 917; Porsche 612; XLR McLaren	Original A/FX			
1621	1972	"CHAMPIONSHIP RACE SET"		Original A/FX			
2019	1972	GOLDEN GATE RACE SET		Original A/FX		Packaged for Montgomery Ward	
2022	1972	"FUNNY CAR SPRINT" RACE SET	Plymouth Cuda Funny Car; Vega Van Gasser	Original A/FX		Packaged for Sears	
2023	1972	"MEADOWBROOK RACEWAY"	Shadow; Ferrari 612	Original A/FX		Packaged for Sears	
2024	1972	"PENSKE SPECIAL" RACE SET	Porsche 510K; Matador Stock Car	Original A/FX		Packaged for Sears	
2025	1972	"BIG BANKED FOUR" RACE SET	Javelin AMX; Camaro Z-28; Ferrari 612; XLR McLaren	Original A/FX		Packaged for Sears	
2026	1972	"PENSKE SPECIAL" RACE SET	Porsche 510K; Matador Stock Car	Original A/FX		Packaged for Sears	
2042	1972	"RALLY MASTER" RACE SET	Plymouth Cuda Funny Car; Pinto Funny Car	Original A/FX			
2051	1972	"DAYTONA SUPER RALLY" RACE SET	Plymouth Cuda Funny Car; Pinto Funny Car; Dodge Charger Daytona; Plymouth Roadrunner	Original A/FX			
2052	1972	"COUNTOURS CUSTOM" RACE SET	Dodge Charger Daytona; Plymouth Roadrunner	Original A/FX			
2053	1972	"FLAMETHROWER" DAYTONA RACE SET	Ferrari 512M; Porsche 917	Original A/FX (lights)			
2054	1972	"SUPER NATIONAL" RACE SET	Plymouth Cuda Funny Car; Pinto Funny Car	Original A/FX			
2055	1972	"BLAZER" RACE SET	Plymouth Cuda Funny Car; Vega Van Gasser	Original A/FX			
2057	1972	"SUPER DAYTONA" RACE SET	Plymouth Roadrunner; Javelin AMX	Original A/FX			
2061	1972	"CALIFORNIA SPEEDWAY" RACE SET	Dodge Charger; Turbo Turnon	Original A/FX	16'		
2062	1972	"WINNER'S CIRCLE" RACE SET	Ferrari 512M; Porsche 917	Original A/FX (lights)			
2070	1972	"RALLY BANK" RACE SET	Plymouth Roadrunner; Javelin AMX	Original A/FX			
2822	1972	"WARWICK FARM" RACE SET		Original A/FX		Australia	
	1973	RALLY RACE SET	Baja Bug VW; Ford Baja Bronco	Original A/FX	21'		
2201	1973	RIVERSIDE 500	Dodge Charger Daytona; Plymouth Roadrunner	Original A/FX	13' 6"		
2202	1973	MONTE CARLO	Porsche 612; XLR McLaren	Original A/FX	18'		
2203	1973	PIT ROW SPECIAL-II	Baja Bug VW; Ford Baja Bronco	Original A/FX	19'		
2204	1973	DAYTONA 880	Camaro Z-28; Dodge Charger Stock Car	Original A/FX	24'		
2205	1973	NATIONAL SPEEDSTERS	'31 Model A Ford Panel; Roarin' Rolls Golden Ghost; Dodge Fever; Furious Fueler	Original A/FX	25'		
2206	1973	MONZA MARATHON	Ferrari 512M; Porsche 917	Original A/FX	32'		
2207	1973	FIRECRACKER 4+4	Plymouth Cuda Funny Car; Plymouth Roadrunner; Corvette Funny Car; Vega Van Gasser	Original A/FX	27'		
2208	1973	LE MANS LIGHTED	Ferrari 512M; Porsche 917	Original A/FX (lights)			
2302	1973	MEADOWBROOK RACEWAY	'55 Chevy Bel-Air; '57 Chevy Nomad	Original A/FX		Packaged for Sears	
2303	1973	PENSKE ROAD RACE	Porsche 510K; Matador Stock Car	Original A/FX		Packaged for Sears	
2304	1973	PENSKE 4-LANE RACE SET	(2) Porsche 510K; XLR McLaren; Shadow	Original A/FX	39'	Packaged for Sears (2 Color artwork	
2305	1973	BANKED MEADOWBROOK SPEEDWAY	Lola T-260; Shadow	Original A/FX		Packaged for Sears	
2306	1973	MONZA SPRINT RACEWAY	Camaro Z-28; Dodge Charger Daytona	Original A/FX	32'	Packaged for Sears	
2307	1973	PENSKE 4-LANE RACE SET	(2) Porsche 510K; XLR McLaren; Shadow	Original A/FX	39'	Packaged for Sears (Full color artwork)	
2309	1973	CALIFORNIA SPEEDWAY	Plymouth Roadrunner; Dodge Charger Daytona	Original A/FX	17' 6"		
2310	1973	WINNER'S CIRCLE	Ferrari 512M; Porsche 917	Original A/FX			
2311	1973	BLAZER 500	Vega Van Gasser; Javelin AMX	Original A/FX	12' 6"		
2312	1973	DAYTONA SPEEDSTERS		Original A/FX	30'		
2314	1973	ELDORADO		Original A/FX			
2317	1973	INTERNATIONAL SPEEDSTERS	'31 Model A Ford Panel; Roarin' Rolls Golden Ghost; Dodge Fever; Furious Fueler	Original A/FX			
2318	1973	CAN-AM SPECIAL	Lola T-260; Shadow	Original A/FX			
2322	1973	GRAND NATIONAL		Original A/FX		Packaged for Montgomery Ward	
2323	1973	GOLDEN GATE	Ferrari 512M; Porsche 917	Original A/FX		Packaged for Montgomery Ward	
2324	1973	FLYING TURNS		Original A/FX	40'	Packaged for Montgomery Ward	
2336	1973	PIT ROW SPECIAL	'31 Model A Ford Panel; Roarin' Rolls Golden Ghost; Dodge Fever; Furious Fueler	Original A/FX Special	19'		
2341	1973	VEGAS SPEEDWAY	Ferrari 512M; Porsche 917	Original A/FX	13'		
2342	1973	LAGUNA SPEEDWAY	Dodge Charger Daytona; Plymouth Roadrunner	Original A/FX			
2344	1973	ATLANTA SPEEDWAY		Original A/FX			
2211	1974	Peter Revson PHOENIX 500	Camaro Z-28; Dodge Charger Daytona	Original A/FX	12'		
2211	1974	PHOENIX 500	Camaro Z-28; Dodge Charger Dayt	Original A/FX	11' 6"		
2212	1974	Peter Revson PIT ROW SPEEDWAY	Ferrari 512M; Porsche 917	Original A/FX	15' 2"		
2212	1974	PIT ROW SPEEDWAY	Ferrari 512M; Porsche 917	Original A/FX	15' 2"		
2213	1974	Peter Revson RACEMASTER CHALLENGER	Vega Van Gasser; Plymouth Cuda Funny Car	Original A/FX	20' 6"		
2213	1974	RACEMASTER CHALLENGE	Vega Van Gasser; Plymouth Cuda Funny Car	Original A/FX	20' 6"		
2214	1974	Peter Revson REVAMATIC 500	Baja Bug VW; Ford Baja Bronco	Original A/FX	25' 8"		
2214	1974	REVAMATIC 500	Baja Bug VW; Ford Baja Bronco	Original A/FX	25' 8"		
2215	1974	Peter Revson CALIFORNIA NATIONAL	Dodge Charger; Plymouth Roadrunner	Original A/FX	27' 6"		
2216	1974	Peter Revson RALLYE 4 + 4		Original A/FX	14'		
2216	1974	RALLYE 4 + 4 RACE SET		Original A/FX			
2217	1974	Peter Revson GRAND ROYALE	XLR McLaren; Lola T-260	Original A/FX	41' 4"		
2217	1974	GRAND ROYALE	XLR McLaren; Lola T-260	Original A/FX	41' 4"		
2218	1974	LIGHTED MARATHON	Ferrari 512M; Porsche 917	Original A/FX (lights)	16' 6"		
2350	1974	LAGUNA 140 RACEWAY	Vega Van Gasser; Pinto Funny Car	Original A/FX	13' 8"	Packaged for Sears (full color artwork)	
2350	1974	LAGUNA 140 RACEWAY	Vega Van Gasser; Pinto Funny Car	Original A/FX	13' 8"	Packaged for Sears (2 color artwork)	
2352	1974	PENSKE SPECIAL RACEWAY	Porsche 510K; Matador Stock Car	AFX Magna-traction	28'	Packaged for Sears	
9642	1974	ROAD AMERICANA SPEEDWAY		AFX Magna-traction		Packaged for Sears	
2357	1974	PENSKE RACE OF CHAMPIONS		AFX Magna-traction		Packaged for Sears	
2358	1974	CUSTOM CLASSIC BANKED MARATHON		AFX Magna-traction	50' 1"	Packaged for Sears	
2359	1974	TWISTER	Dodge Charger Stock Car; Matador Stock Car	Original A/FX	12' 8"		
2360	1974	BLAZER with LIGHTED CARS		AFX Magna-traction (lights)	17' 8"		
2361	1974	PRETZEL BENDER	'55 Chevy Bel-Air; Baja Bug VW	AFX Magna-traction	19' 2"	Packaged for Montgomery Ward	
2362	1974	GOLDEN GATE	Lola T-260; Shadow	AFX Magna-traction	24'	Packaged for Montgomery Ward	
2363	1974	FLYING TURNS	Datsun 240Z; Datsun 510	AFX Magna-traction	34' 7"	Packaged for Montgomery Ward	
2365	1974	SOUNDMASTER 300	Dodge Charger Daytona; Matador Stock Car	Original A/FX	23' 1"		
2369	1974	REVAMATIC SOUND	Ferrari 512M; Porsche 917	Original A/FX (lights)	18' 1"		
2372	1974	BLAZER 500		Original A/FX	12"		
2373	1974	FLAMETHROWER 880	Ferrari 512M; Porsche 917	Original A/FX	29' 5"		
2377	1974	CAN-AM SPECIAL	Shadow; Porsche 917-10	Original A/FX	13' 3"		
2378	1974	SPEED CORNERS		Original A/FX	13' 1"		
2381	1974	CALIFORNIA SPEEDWAY	Matador Stock Car; Plymouth Roadrunner	AFX Magna-traction	13' 8"		
2382	1974	WINNERS CIRCLE	Ferrari 512M; Porsche 917	AFX Magna-traction (lights)	17' 8"		
2383	1974	Polaroid Set	Datsun 240Z; Datsun Baja Pickup	AFX Magna-traction		Manufactured for Polaroid employees	
2388	1974	NIGHT CHALLENGE	Ferrari 512M; Porsche 917	Original A/FX (lights)			
2379	1974	AROUND and SOUND	Dodge Charger Stock Car; Plymouth Roadrunner	Original A/FX	18' 1"		
2230	1975	Jackie Stewart OVAL EIGHT	Datsun Baja Pickup; Ford Baja Bronco	AFX Magna-traction	10' 6"		
2231	1975	Jackie Stewart NITE LIGHTS	Ferrari 512M; Porsche 917	AFX Magna-traction (lights)	11' 6"		
2232	1975	Jackie Stewart HIGH BANK CHALLENGE	Ferrari 512M; Porsche 917	AFX Magna-traction	13' 7"		
2233	1975	Jackie Stewart REVAMATIC COMPETITION	Lola T-260; Porsche 917-10	AFX Magna-traction	18' 10"		
2234	1975	Jackie Stewart UNIVERSAL HIGH SPEED		AFX Magna-traction	28' 7"		
2235	1975	Jackie Stewart CHAMPIONSHIP FOUR	Dodge Charger; Dodge Charger Daytona; Matador Stock Car; Plymouth Roadrunner	AFX Magna-traction	32'		
2236	1975	Jackie Stewart GRAND ROYALE		AFX Magna-traction	41' 4"		
2239	1975	Jackie Stewart REVAMATIC ENDURO		AFX Magna-traction	15' 10"		
2252	1975	PENSKE SPECIAL RACEWAY	Camaro Z-28; Matador Stock Car	AFX Magna-traction	25' 6"	Packaged for Sears (full color artwork)	
2256	1975	MEADOWBROOK RACEWAY		AFX Magna-traction	15' 1"	Packaged for Sears	
2257	1975	PENSKE SPECIAL RACEWAY	Camaro Z-28; Matador Stock Car	AFX Magna-traction	25' 6"	Packaged for Sears (2 color artwork)	
2260	1975	Jackie Stewart TWIN OVAL NITE RACER 250	Ferrari 512M; Porsche 917	AFX Magna-traction (lights)	11' 8"		
2261	1975	CHALLENGER RACEWAY	Matador Stock Car; Plymouth Roadrunner	AFX Magna-traction	16' 7"		
2262	1975	GOLDEN GATE	Ferrari 512M; Porsche 917	AFX Magna-traction	25' 2"	Packaged for Montgomery Ward	
	1975	HIGH SIERRA CUSTOM		AFX Magna-traction		Packaged for Montgomery Ward	
2265	1975	TWISTER RACE SET WITH LAP COUNTER	Matador Stock Car; Matador Stocker	AFX Magna-traction	10' 6"		
2266	1975	Jackie Stewart CALIFORNIA SPEEDWAY	Dodge Charger; Dodge Charger Daytona	AFX Magna-traction	11' 6"		
2267	1975	Jackie Stewart WINNERS CIRCLE LIGHTED	Ferrari 512M; Porsche 917	AFX Magna-traction (lights)	16' 2"		
2268	1975	Jackie Stewart REVAMATIC SOUND SUPER SPEEDWAY	Matador Stocker	AFX Magna-traction	17' 8"		
2269	1975	Jackie Stewart ALPINE 500	Ferrari 512M; Porsche 917	AFX Magna-traction	17' 5"		
2270	1975	Jackie Stewart PRO CHALLENGE 500	Matador Stock Car; Matador Stocker; Porsche 917-10; Porsche 510K	AFX Magna-traction	14' 2"		
2271	1975	Jackie Stewart REVAMATIC CHALLENGE		AFX Magna-traction	15' 10"		
2272	1975	Jackie Stewart RALLY SPRINT		AFX Magna-traction	13' 3"		
2273	1975	Jackie Stewart ELDORADO 250		AFX Magna-traction	20' 7"		
2071	1976	Jackie Stewart OVAL EIGHT	Ferrari 512M; Porsche 917	AFX Magna-traction	11'		
2072	1976	Jackie Stewart DAY & NIGHT ENDURO	Ferrari 512M; Porsche 917	AFX Magna-traction (lights)	11' 8"		
2073	1976	Jackie Stewart DUAL OVAL SPEEDWAY	VW Thing; Ford Baja Bronco	AFX Magna-traction; AFX Magna-traction Special	15' 2"		
2073	1976	Jackie Stewart DUAL OVAL SPEEDWAY	VW Thing; Ford Baja Bronco	AFX Magna-traction; AFX Magna-traction Special	15' 2"	Canadian set	
2074	1976	Jackie Stewart PIT STOP CHALLENGE	Lola T-260; Porsche Carrera	AFX Magna-traction	17'		
2075	1976	Jackie Stewart HI-BANKED	Porsche Carrera; Corvette	AFX Magna-traction	22'		
2076	1976	Jackie Stewart REVAMATIC SOUND	Ferrari 512M; Porsche 917	AFX Magna-traction	23' 2"		
2077	1976	Jackie Stewart FIRECRACKER FOUR CAR	Mercury Stocker; Dodge Charger; Plymouth Roadrunner; Matador Stocker	AFX Magna-traction	16'		
2078	1976	Jackie Stewart GRAND PRIX ROYALE	Lola T-330; Ferrari 312 PB	G-Plus	41'		
2080	1976	Jackie Stewart LIGHTED DOUBLE EIGHT	Ferrari 512M; Porsche 917	AFX Magna-traction (lights)	11' 8"		
2081	1976	Jackie Stewart CALIFORNIA CHALLENGE		AFX Magna-traction	13' 4"		
2083	1976	Jackie Stewart ARIZONA 500	Mercury Stocker; Matador Stocker	AFX Magna-traction	17' 10"		
2084	1976	Jackie Stewart NATIONAL SPEEDSTERS LIGHTED	Ferrari 512M; Porsche 917; '55 Chevy Bel-Air	AFX Magna-traction (lights)	21' 4"		
2090	1976	Jackie Stewart RACEMASTER SPEEDWAY		AFX Magna-traction			
2163	1976	Jackie Stewart CHAMPIONSHIP RACEWAY	Plymouth Roadrunner; Matador Stock Car	AFX Magna-traction	25' 6"		
2166	1976	Jackie Stewart MEADOWBROOK RACEWAY		AFX Magna-traction	15' 6"	Packaged for Sears	
2167	1976	Jackie Stewart CHAMPIONSHIP RACEWAY	Plymouth Roadrunner; Matador Stock Car	AFX Magna-traction	25' 6"	Packaged for Sears	
2168	1976	Jackie Stewart 4-LANE RACE OF CHAMPIONS		G-Plus	14' 2"	Packaged for Sears	
2169	1976	Jackie Stewart CUSTOM CLASSIC BANKED MARATHON		G-Plus		Packaged for Sears	
2171	1976	Jackie Stewart GOLDEN GATE		AFX Magna-traction			
2172	1976	Jackie Stewart HI-BANKED GRAND PRIX	Ferrari 512M; Porsche 917	AFX Magna-traction (lights)	33' 2"		
2173	1976	TWISTER RACE SET WITH LAP COUNTER	Ferrari 512M; Lola T-260	AFX Magna-traction	10' 6"		
2176	1976	Jackie Stewart CALIFORNIA SPEEDWAY	Javelin AMX; Lola T-260	AFX Magna-traction	11' 6"		
2177	1976	Jackie Stewart WINNER'S CIRCLE	Ferrari 512M; Porsche 917	AFX Magna-traction (lights)	16' 2"		
2178	1976	Jackie Stewart ROYALE CHAMPIONSHIP	Chevelle Stocker; Matador Stocker	AFX Magna-traction	23'2"		
2181	1976	Jackie Stewart FIGURE EIGHT		AFX Magna-traction			
2182	1976	VENOMOUS VANS	(2) Dodge Street Van	AFX Magna-traction Special		Snake stickers included for vans.	
2192	1976	Jackie Stewart TRI-LEVEL SPEEDWAY	Matador Stocker; Chevelle Stocker	AFX Magna-traction	14' 6"		
2193	1976	Jackie Stewart SADDLEBROOK 500		AFX Magna-traction	22'		
2055	1977	24 HOUR ENDURO		AFX Magna-traction (lights)	26' 4"		
2101	1977	DAYTONA '500'	Ferrari 512M; Porsche 917	AFX Magna-traction	10' 6"		
2102	1977	12 HRS. at SEBRING	Ferrari 512M; Porsche 917	AFX Magna-traction (lights)	11' 8"		
2102	1977	NITE LIGHTS	Ferrari 512M; Porsche 917	AFX Magna-traction (lights)	11' 8"	Canadian Set	
2103	1977	DARLINGTON '500'	Mercury Stocker; Chevelle Stocker	AFX Magna-traction	15' 2"		
2104	1977	POCONO CAN-AM		AFX Magna-traction	17'		
2105	1977	RIVERSIDE '400'		AFX Magna-traction	21' 4"		
2106	1977	WATKINS GLEN GRAND PRIX	Ferrari F-1; McLaren F-1	G-Plus	23' 2"		
2107	1977	FIRECRACKER '400'		AFX Magna-traction	14' 11"		
2108	1977	GRAND PRIX MONACO		G-Plus			
2111	1977	SUNRISE '250'	Mercury Stocker; Chevelle Stocker	AFX Magna-traction	9'		
2115	1977	24 HR. ENDURO	Ferrari 512M; Porsche 917	AFX Magna-traction	12' 8"		
2116	1977	WESTERN CLASSIC	Ferrari 512M; Porsche 917; Dodge Charger Daytona	AFX Magna-traction (lights)	17'		
2120	1977	CHAMPIONSHIP DAY-NIGHT RACEWAY		AFX Magna-traction	24' 2"	Packaged for Sears	
2122	1977	MEADOWBROOK RACEWAY	Ferrari 512M; Porsche 917	AFX Magna-traction	13' 8"		
2123	1977	CHAMPIONSHIP RACEWAY	Mercury Stocker; Chevelle Stocker	AFX Magna-traction	24' 2		
2124	1977	CUSTOM CLASSIC BANKED MARATHON	Ferrari F-1; McLaren F-1	G-Plus	46'		
2125	1977	ENDURO CHALLENGE		AFX Magna-traction	9'	Packaged for Sears	
2126	1977	MEADOWBROOK RACEWAY	Ferrari 512M; Porsche 917	AFX Magna-traction	13' 8"	Packaged for Sears	
2127	1977	CHAMPIONSHIP RACEWAY	Mercury Stocker; Chevelle Stocker	AFX Magna-traction	24' 2"	Packaged for Sears	
2128?	1977	4-LANE RACE OF CHAMPIONS		AFX Magna-traction	13' 5"		
2129	1977	CUSTOM CLASSIC BANKED MARATHON		G-Plus	46' 10"	Packaged for Sears	
2130	1977	INTERNATIONAL GRAND ROYALE RACEWAY		G-Plus	53'	Packaged for Sears	
2131	1977	CHALLENGER RACEWAY		AFX Magna-traction	13'		
2132	1977	GOLDEN GATE	Matador Stocker; Chevelle Stocker	AFX Magna-traction	22'		
2133	1977	HI-BANKED GRAND PRIX RACEWAY	Ferrari 512M; Porsche 917	AFX Magna-traction (lights)	27' 9"		
2134	1977	4 + 4 SPEEDWAY		AFX Magna-traction			
2135	1977	TWISTER with LAP COUNTER	Ferrari 512M; Porsche 917	AFX Magna-traction	10' 6"		
2136	1977	CALIFORNIA SPEEDWAY	Porsche 917-10; Porsche 510K	AFX Magna-traction	11' 6"		
2137	1977	WINNER'S CIRCLE	Ferrari 512M; Porsche 917	AFX Magna-traction (lights)	16' 2"		
2138	1977	ROYALE CHAMPIONSHIP	Matador Stocker; Chevelle Stocker	AFX Magna-traction	21'		
2141	1977	LIGHTED ENDURO	Dodge Charger Daytona; Ferrari 512M	AFX Magna-traction (lights)			
2148	1977	NASSAU '500'	Ferrari 512M; Porsche 917	AFX Magna-traction	21' 4"		
2154	1977	SADDLEBROOK CHALLENGE		AFX Magna-traction			
2160	1977	DAY & NIGHT RALLY	Ferrari 512M; Porsche 917	AFX Magna-traction (lights)	12' 8"		
	1977	NATIONAL DAY & NIGHT		AFX Magna-traction (lights)			
22??	1977	CUSTOM CLASSIC BANKED MARATHON RACE SET		G-Plus	50' 8"	Packaged for Sears	
2229	1977	CUSTOM VAN	(2) Dodge Street Van	AFX Magna-traction Special	9'	Includes snake stickers for vans.	
2229	1977	CUSTOM VAN	(2) Dodge Street Van	AFX Magna-traction Special	9'	Canadian set, with snake stickers for vans.	
GX6000	1977	World Championship Motor Racing (Europe)		G-Plus		European set	
2901	1977	GRAND CHALLENGE	Porsche 917-10; Shadow	Ultra 5			
2902	1977	PRO AM CLASSIC		Ultra 5			
2903	1977	FUTURA 500	Porsche 510K; Shadow	Ultra 5			
2928	1977	CHAMPIONSHIP CLASSIC		Ultra 5			
GX1250	1977	World Championship Motor Racing		AFX Magna-traction		European Set	
2001	1977	ROAD BURNERS Super Sprint		Screeecher - Fixed Steering	9'		
2053	1978	WINNER'S CIRCLE	(2) Dodge Charger	AFX Magna-Sonic	16' 2"		
2135	1978	Twister with Lap Counter		AFX Magna-traction	10' 6"	Packaged for Woolworths	
2409	1978	Challenger's Trophy	Chevelle Stocker; Dodge Charger	AFX Magna-Sonic	12'		
2436	1978	Western Classic		AFX Magna-traction (lights)	17' 1"		
2437	1978	Saddlebrook 500	Mercury Stocker; Chevelle Stocker	AFX Magna-traction	22' 11"		
2438	1978	Monaco Special	Lola T-330; Ferrari F-1	G-Plus	48' 3"		
2441	1978	Road Atlanta	Ferrari 512M; Porsche 917	AFX Magna-traction	11'		
2442	1978	Daytona	Plymouth Roadrunner; Chevelle Stocker	AFX Magna-Sonic	11'		
2442	1978	RALLYE		AFX Magna-Sonic	11'	Canadian set, 1977 packaging style	
2443	1978	Sebring	Ferrari 512M; Porsche 917	AFX Magna-traction (lights)	12' 5"		
2444	1978	Darlington	Plymouth Roadrunner; Chevelle Stocker	AFX Magna-Sonic	15' 9"		
2445	1978	Pocono	Chevelle Stocker; Dodge Charger Daytona	AFX Magna-traction (lights)	16' 1"		
2446	1978	Riverside		AFX Magna-Sonic			
2446	1978	RIVERSIDE		AFX Magna-Sonic			
2447	1978	Road America		AFX Magna-Sonic	23' 5"		
2448	1978	Watkins Glen	Lola T-330; Ferrari F-1	G-Plus	26' 8"		
2449	1978	Firecracker 400		AFX Magna-Sonic	30' 10"		
2450	1978	Monaco		G-Plus			
2451	1978	Nassau 250	Chevelle Stocker; Plymouth Roadrunner	AFX Magna-Sonic	9' 6"		
2452	1978	Speedway Classic		AFX Magna-traction (lights)			
2454	1978	Thunderbird Rally	Chevelle Stocker; Plymouth Roadrunner	AFX Magna-Sonic	20' 3"		
2457	1978	Silver Anniversary Corvette	(2) Chromed Corvette	AFX Magna-traction	16' 9"		
2460	1978	Rally Sprint	Mercury Stocker; Chevelle Stocker	AFX Magna-traction	9' 6"		
2461	1978	Sunrise 500	Ferrari 512M; Porsche 917	AFX Magna-traction (lights)	11'		
2462	1978	National Speedway	Chevelle Stocker; Plymouth Roadrunner	AFX Magna-Sonic	14' 4"		
2464	1978	Grand Prix Championship	Lola T-330; Ferrari F-1	G-Plus			
2465	1978	Twister	Matador Stock; Mercury Stocker	AFX Magna-Traction	9' 6"		
2466	1978	California Speedway	Plymouth Roadrunner; Chevelle Stocker	AFX Magna-Sonic	11'		
2468	1978	Winner's Circle	Dodge Charger Daytona; Chevelle Stocker	AFX Magna-traction (lights)	15' 9"		
2469	1978	Championship Royale	Chevelle Stocker; Plymouth Roadrunner	AFX Magna-Sonic	20' 5"		
2473	1978	Championship Raceway	Plymouth Roaderunner; Chevelle Stocker	AFX Magna-Sonic	21' 11"		
2474	1978	Day-Night Marathon Raceway		AFX Magna-traction (lights)			
96076	1978	Super Enduro Challenge	Chevelle Stocker; Dodge Charger Daytona	AFX Magna-traction (lights)	16'		
2477	1978	Championship Raceway		AFX Magna-Sonic	21' 11"	Packaged for Sears	
2478	1978	4 Lane Race of Champions	Dodge Charger Daytona; Camaro Z-28; Chevelle Stocker; Monza GT	AFX Magna-traction (lights)	24' 4"	Packaged for Sears	
2479	1978	Custom Classic Banked Marathon		G-Plus		Packaged for Sears	
2480	1978	International Grand Royale		G-Plus	44'	Packaged for Sears	
2481	1978	Challenger Raceway	Ferrari 512M; Porsche 917	AFX Magna-traction	12'	Packaged for Montgomery Ward	
2482	1978	Golden Gate Road Race		AFX Magna-Sonic	21' 7"		
2483	1978	Hi-Banked Grand Prix	Dodge Charger Daytona; Chevelle Stocker	AFX Magna-traction (lights)	27' 1"		
2484	1978	4 Lane Four Plus Four Speedway	Chevelle Stocker; Plymouth Roadrunner; Ford Escort; Javelin	AFX Magna-Sonic	26' 2"		
2496	1978	Police Pursuit Challenge	Matador Police Car; 55 Chevy Bel-Air	AFX Magna-traction	8' 8"		
2499	1978	Enduro Championship	Plymouth Roadrunner; Chevelle Stocker	AFX Magna-Sonic	12' 4"		
	1978	Custom Van Challenge	Ford Custom Van; Ford Street Van	AFX Magna-traction Special			
	1978	Meadowbrook Raceway		AFX Magna-Sonic			
GX1750	1978	24 HOUR RACE		AFX Magna-traction (lights)		European set	
GX2500	1978	World Championship Motor Racing		AFX Magna-Sonic		European set	
2603		LEDY PISTA LE MANS		G-Plus		Mexican Set	
		MARATHON		AFX Magna-Sonic			
2901	1978	GRAND CHALLENGE	(2) out of Porsche 510K; Shadow; Mercury Stocker; Matador Stocker; Porsche 917-10; Lola T-260	Ultra 5			
2902	1978	PRO AM CLASSIC	(2) out of Porsche 510K; Shadow; Mercury Stocker; Matador Stocker; Porsche 917-10; Lola T-260	Ultra 5			
2911	1978	CAN AM CLASSIC	(2) out of Porsche 510K; Shadow; Mercury Stocker; Matador Stocker; Porsche 917-10; Lola T-260	Ultra 5			
2912	1978	TORNADO TWIN 250	(2) out of Porsche 510K; Shadow; Mercury Stocker; Matador Stocker; Porsche 917-10; Lola T-260	Ultra 5			
2913	1978	SUPER CYCLONE 500	(2) out of Porsche 510K; Shadow; Mercury Stocker; Matador Stocker; Porsche 917-10; Lola T-260	Ultra 5			
2914	1978	CHAMPIONSHIP ROYALE	(2) out of Porsche 510K; Shadow; Mercury Stocker; Matador Stocker; Porsche 917-10; Lola T-260	Ultra 5			
2920?	1978	GRAND NATIONAL	(2) out of Porsche 510K; Shadow; Mercury Stocker; Matador Stocker; Porsche 917-10; Lola T-260	Ultra 5			
2920	1978	FUTURA CHALLENGE 500	(2) out of Porsche 510K; Shadow; Mercury Stocker; Matador Stocker; Porsche 917-10; Lola T-260	Ultra 5			
2921	1978	GALAXY 250	(2) out of Porsche 510K; Shadow; Mercury Stocker; Matador Stocker; Porsche 917-10; Lola T-260	Ultra 5		Packaged for Sears	
2923	1978	AMERICANA 2000	(2) out of Porsche 510K; Shadow; Mercury Stocker; Matador Stocker; Porsche 917-10; Lola T-260	Ultra 5			
2925	1978	ENDURO CHAMPIONSHIP	(2) out of Porsche 510K; Shadow; Mercury Stocker; Matador Stocker; Porsche 917-10; Lola T-260	Ultra 5			
2940	1978	RALLY CROSS 1000	(2) out of Porsche 510K; Shadow; Mercury Stocker; Matador Stocker; Porsche 917-10; Lola T-260	Ultra 5			
2944	1978	AMERICANA 2000	(2) out of Porsche 510K; Shadow; Mercury Stocker; Matador Stocker; Porsche 917-10; Lola T-260	Ultra 5			
	1978	CHAMPIONSHIP CHALLENGE	(2) out of Porsche 510K; Shadow; Mercury Stocker; Matador Stocker; Porsche 917-10; Lola T-260	Ultra 5			
2952	1978	AUTO CROSS CHALLENGE	(2) out of Porsche 510K; Shadow; Mercury Stocker; Matador Stocker; Porsche 917-10; Lola T-260	Ultra 5			
GX2000		World Championship Motor Racing		AFX Magna-traction		European set	
GX4000		World Championship Motor Racing		G-Plus		European set	
2302	1979	Championship Raceway	Monza GT; Camaro Z-28	MagnaTraction Flamethrower	17'	Packaged for Sears	
2303	1979	Championship Raceway	Monza GT; Camaro Z-28	AFX Magna-traction (lights)	17'		
2304	1979	Mario Andretti GRAND PRIX INTERNATIONAL Custom Classic	Mario Andretti Lotus; Ferrari F-1	G-Plus	32' 6"	Packaged for Sears	
2305	1979	Mario Andretti GRAND PRIX INTERNATIONAL Custom Classic	Mario Andretti Lotus; Ferrari F-1	G-Plus	32' 6"		
2308	1979	Twister	Chevelle Stocker; Dodge Charger	AFX Magna-traction	8' 6"	Packaged for Woolworth	
2309	1979	Mario Andretti Grand Prix International Challenge	Mario Andretti Lotus; Ferrari F-1	G-Plus	12'		
2322	1979	Golden Gate Road Race	Monza GT; Camaro Z-28	AFX Magna-traction (lights)	18' 6"		
2335	1979	California Van Speedway	Ford Street Van; Ford Custom Van	AFX Magna-traction Special	10'		
2339	1979	FIREBIRD FEVER	(2) Pontiac Firebird	AFX Magna-traction (lights)	17'		
2340	1979	Saddlebrook 500	Monza GT; Camaro Z-28	AFX Magna-traction (lights)	22'		
2341	1979	Monaco Special	Mario Andretti Lotus; Ferrari F-1	G-Plus	40'		
2701	1979	Daytona 500	Chevelle Stocker; Dodge Charger Stock Car	AFX Magna-traction	10'		
2702	1979	Riverside	Chevelle Stocker; Plymouth Roadrunner	AFX Magna-Sonic	11'		
2703	1979	Mario Andretti GRAND PRIX INTERNATIONAL Challenge	Mario Andretti Lotus; Ferrari F-1	G-Plus	14'		
2704	1979	Smokey and the AFX Express	Peterbilt; Police Car	AFX Magna-traction	20' 6"		
2705	1979	Mario Andretti GRAND PRIX INTERNATIONAL Championship	Mario Andretti Lotus; Ferrari F-1; Extra bodies: Tyrrell F-1; McLaren F-1	G-Plus	24' 6"		
2706	1979	Firecracker 400	Plymouth Roadrunner; Dodge Charger; Chevelle Stocker; Javelin	AFX Magna-Sonic	27'		
2707	1979	Data Race Challenge	Porsche 917-10; Shadow	AFX Magna-traction	15'		
2708	1979	Data Race Championship	Porsche 917-10; Shadow	AFX Magna-traction	15'		
2801	1979	Super Eight	Chevelle Stocker; Dodge Charger	AFX Magna-traction	8' 6"		
2802	1979	Super Eight Lighted	Monza GT; Camaro Z-28	AFX Magna-traction (lights)	8' 6"		
2803	1979	Mario Andretti Grand Prix International Classic	Mario Andretti Lotus; Ferrari F-1	G-Plus	13'		
2804	1979	Smokey and the AFX Express	Peterbilt; Police Car	AFX Magna-traction	18' 6"		
2883	1979	Mario Andretti Grand Prix International Trophy	Mario Andretti Lotus; Lola T-330	G-Plus	13'		
	1979	International Grand Prix		AFX Magna-traction	17' 6"		
5719	1979	Road Hog Raceway	Corvette GT; Ford Escort; BMW 320i Turbo	Speed Steer	18'	Packaged for Sears	
5721	1979	Road Hog Raceway	Corvette GT; Ford Escort; BMW 320i Turbo	Speed Steer	18'		
5821	1979	Enduro	BMW 320i Turbo; Corvette GT	Speed Steer	18'		
5822	1979	Convoy Challenge	(2) Peterbilt	Speed Steer	20' 6"		
5823	1979	3-Car Road Blocker	BMW 320i Turbo; Ford Escort; Corvette GT	Speed Steer	20' 6"		
5825	1979	Data Race II		Speed Steer			
5922	1979	Convoy Challenge	(2) Peterbilt	Speed Steer	18' 6"		
5923	1979	3-Car Road Blocker	BMW 320i Turbo; Ford Escort; Corvette GT	Speed Steer	18'		
	1979	Gold Cup Raceway		Speed Steer	20' 6"		
90001	1979	CUSTOM VAN Road Set	Dodge Street Van; Ford Street Van	AFX Magna-traction Special			
90002	1979	Daytona 500					
90003	1979	Rallye Race Set					
90004	1979	Police Pursuit					
90005	1979	INDY SPECIAL	Foyt Indy Special; Indy Special; Corvette	G-Plus			
90006	1979	OVERNITE EXPRESS	(2) Peterbilt	AFX Magna-traction (lights)			
90007	1979	High Banked Raceway					
90008	1979	Golden Gate Race Set					
90009	1979	Mario Andretti Grand Prix International					
90010	1979	FOUR LANE SPEEDWAY 4+4		AFX Magna-Sonic			
90011	1979	Data Race					
90012	1979	GRAND PRIX MONACO (Canada)	Tyrrell F-1; Ferrari F-1; Extras: Dodge Charger; Chevelle Stocker	G-Plus			
90013	1979	CUSTOM VAN (Canada /with maple leaf decal sheet)	(2) Dodge Street Van	AFX Magna-traction Special	9'		
90081	1979	GRAND CHALLENGE	Ford Escort; Firebird; Corvette GT	Speed Steer			
90083	1979	CHAMPIONSHIP ROYALE		Speed Steer			
90115	1979	LIGHTED RIGS SKYWAY	(2) Peterbilt	AFX Magna-traction (lights)			
RS1500		Rally Sport		AFX Magna-traction		European set	
GX3000		World Championship Motor Racing		G-Plus		European set	
10005	1980	SKYWAY PATROL	Peterbilt; Police Car	AFX Magna-traction (Overhead lights)	13'		
10005	1980	PATROULLE DE ROUTE SURELEVEE	Peterbilt; Police Car	AFX Magna-traction (Overhead lights)	13'	Canadian Set	
10015	1980	GRAND PRIX CANADIEN		G-Plus			
10080	1980	THRILL SHOW		Speed Steer			
10081	1980	MANIAC MADNESS		Speed Steer			
80001	1980	LITED OVAL SPRINT	(2) Firebird	AFX Magna-traction (lights)			
80001	1980	CAMIONNETTE SPECIALE	(2) Dodge Street Van	AFX Magna-traction Special		Canadian Set	
80002	1980	FIREBIRD FEVER	(2) Firebird	AFX Magna-traction (lights)	10' 6"		
80003	1980	NITE CHASE	Firebird; Police Car	AFX Magna-traction (Overhead lights)			
80006	1980	4 x 4 LITED BLAZER RALLYE	(2) Blazer	AFX Magna-traction (lights)			
80007	1980	HIGHWAY PURSUIT Bridge Set	Peterbilt; Police Car	AFX Magna-traction (Overhead lights)			
80008	1980	GRAND PRIX INTERNATIONAL	Lola T-330; Ferrari F-1	G-Plus	22' 1"		
80010	1980	Data Race Computerized					
80016	1980	RALLYE DE JEEPS	(2) Jeep CJ7	AFX Magna-traction (lights)		Canadian Set	
80023	1980	4 x 4 JEEP CHALLENGE	(2) Jeep CJ7	AFX Magna-traction (lights)			
80032	1980	FOUR WHEEL CHALLENGE	Jeep CJ7; Blazer	AFX Magna-traction			
80037	1980	NITE CHASE AMERICA	55 Chevy Bel-Air; Police Car	AFX Magna-traction (Overhead lights)	10' 8"		
80040	1980	Turbo Powered		Speed Shifter			
80041	1980	Truckers Challenge		Speed Shifter			
80080	1980	TRUCK "ROAD-EO"		Speed Steer			
80081	1980	3 Car Grand Challenge		Speed Steer			
80082	1980	3 Car Champion Royale		Speed Steer			
90013	1980	CUSTOM VAN	(2) Custom Van	AFX Magna-traction Special			
90018	1980	Firecracker 400					
90026	1980	LITED RIG POLICE CHASE	Peterbilt; Police Car	AFX Magna-traction (Overhead lights)			
90027	1980	Spiral Challenge					
90028	1980	Lited Oval Sprint					
90031	1980	ROCKY MOUNTAIN EXPRESS	(2) Peterbilt	AFX Magna-traction (lights)			
GX2750	1980	POLICE CHASE AND RACE		AFX Magna-traction		European set	
GX1150	1980	World Championship Motor Racing		AFX Magna-traction		European set	
GX1100	1980	World Championship Motor Racing	(Random selection)	G-Plus		European set	
GX4500	1980	World Championship Motor Racing		G-Plus		European set	
GX1900	1980	Rallye Epoca	Model A 1930 Ford Coupe; 56 Ford Pickup	AFX Magna-traction Special		European Set	
XL002	1980	LAZER 2000	(2) "Turbo Turnon" Lazer 2000; (2) "Too Much" Lazer 2000	G-Plus		European Set	
1600	1980	CIRCUITO COMPETICION		G-Plus			
10002	1981	FIREBIRD FEVER	(2) Firebird	AFX Magna-traction (lights)	8'		
10013	1981	MONACO GRAND PRIX		G-Plus			
10015	1981	CANADIAN GRAND PRIX		G-Plus			
10021	1981	DAY AND NIGHT CHAMPIONSHIP		AFX Magna-traction (lights)			
10023	1981	DAREDEVIL HAZARD		AFX Magna-traction		Canadian set	
10024	1981	SAFARI FEVER	Blazer; Jeep CJ7	AFX Magna-traction	11' 8"	Canadian Set	
10041	1981	corvette challenge	(2) Chromed Corvettes	AFX Magna-traction	8' 6"		
10043	1981	DAY AND NIGHT MARATHON	Jeep CJ7; Blazer	Cat's Eyes (lights)			
10044	1981	CROSS COUNTRY RALLYE	Jeep CJ7; Blazer	Cat's Eyes (lights)			
10045	1981	COLLISION CHALLENGE	Firebird; Corvette GT	Blazin' Brakes (lights)	14' 6"		
10046	1981	HIGHWAY PURSUIT BRIDGE SET	Peterbilt; Police Car	AFX Magna-traction (lights)	19' 6"		
10047	1981	SUPER TURBO CHALLENGE	BMW M1 Turbo; Porsche 934 Turbo	Speed Shifter	16'		
10048	1981	RADAR CHASE	State Police Car; Firebird	AFX Magna-traction (Overhead lights)			
10049	1981	Grand Prix International					
10051	1981	Data Race Computerized					
10052	1981	TURBO RIG CHALLENGE	(2) Peterbilt	Speed Shifter			
10059	1981	RADAR CHALLENGE	State Police Car; Firebird	AFX Magna-traction (Overhead lights)			
10060	1981	King of the Road	(2) Peterbilt	AFX Magna-traction			
10090	1981	Thrill Show		Speed Steer			
10091	1981	MANIAC MADNESS		Speed Steer			
10092	1981	BOOMERANG POLICE CHASE		Speed Steer			
20405	1981	GOLDEN GATE CHALLENGE		AFX Magna-traction (lights)			
20406	1981	Corvette Challenge	(2) Chromed Corvettes	AFX Magna-traction	9'		
	1981	BLAZIN' BRAKES DOUBLE EIGHT CHALLENGE		Blazin' Brakes (lights)		Australia	
GX2850	1981	STOP! POLICE		AFX Magna-traction (Overhead lights)		European set	
20001	1982	Custom Eight	(2) Chromed Corvettes	AFX Magna-traction	6' 6"		
21002	1982	Roarin' Rolls-Royce		AFX Magna-traction Special			
20009	1982	NITE CHASE AMERICA		AFX Magna-traction (Overhead lights)			
20010	1982	BIG RIG CHALLENGE	Peterbilt; GMC Astro	AFX Magna-traction (lights)			
20015	1982	King of the Road		AFX Magna-traction	8' 6"		
20017	1982	LAZER 2000 WALL CLIMBER	(2) Lazer Cars	G-Plus	10'		
20018	1982	G.P.1200	Lola T-330; Indy Special	Super G-Plus	12'		
20021	1982	Fall Guy Bounty Hunter	Dodge Charger; Fall Guy Pickup Truck	AFX Magna-traction	11' 6"		
20023	1982	LAZER 2000 WALL CLIMBER	(2) Lazer Cars	G-Plus	11' 6"		
20024	1982	LAZER 2000 WALL CLIMBER	(2) Lazer Cars	G-Plus	12' 6"		
20030	1982	G.P. 1600		Super G-Plus	16'		
20038	1982	G.P. 3000		Super G-Plus	20'		
20039	1982	LAZER 2000 WALL CLIMBER II		G-Plus			
20042	1982	SUPER TURBO CHALLENGE		Speed Shifter			
20048	1982, 1983	DAYTONA		AFX Magna-traction	12' 9"		
20054	1982, 1983	BIG RYDER Inter City Hauler		AFX Magna-traction			
20057	1982	BIG RYDER Container Trucking	Peterbilt; GMC Astro	AFX Magna-traction (lights)			
20060	1982	BIG RYDER Intercity Express Delivery	Peterbilt; GMC Astro	AFX Magna-traction (lights)			
20063	1982	Big Ryder Cross Country Dispatch	Peterbilt; GMC Astro				
20401	1982	REBEL CHALLENGE		AFX Magna-traction		20407 1982 REBEL CHALLENGE AFX Magna-traction Canadian Release	
20421	1982, 1983	Fall Guy Bounty Hunter	Dodge Charger; Fall Guy Pickup Truck	AFX Magna-traction	11' 6"	Dated 1982 on the box, 20421 was a Canadian Final Release	
30006	1983	MASH	Blazer; Jeep CJ7	AFX Magna-traction		Unreleased	
30025	1983	LAZER 2000 (Double Loop)		G-Plus		Unreleased	
30066	1983	FIRE ENGINE		AFX Magna-traction (lights)		Unreleased	

== List of A/FX Parts, Packaging, Track and Car Accessories ==
Part #	Year	Description	Type	Photo
1342	1972	Power Pack	Track Parts	
1422	1979	Data Race Control Center	Track Parts	
1423	1974	Data Race Sound Tower	Track Parts	
1454	1971	Russkit Hand Controller	Track Parts	
1455	1974	LAP TIMER	Track Parts	
1457	1975	Revamatic Sound Grandstand Units	Track Parts	
1461	1971	High Performance Parts Kit	Car Parts	
1466	1975	(8) Billboard Retaining Walls	Track Parts	
1489	1973	RACE CASE WITH TRAY	Car Parts	
1493	1978	Overhead Lap Counter	Track Parts	
1565	1976	Track Elevation Supports	Track Parts	
1587	1976	Modular Bridge Supports	Track Parts	
1589	1974	Combination Tool and Circuit Tester	Track Parts	
1750	1971	Display Cube	Packaging	
2403	1972	(2) 9 inch "Y" track	Track Parts	
2416	1971	(2) 7" Straight track	Track Parts	
2501	1975	Track packaging card	Packaging	
2501	1979	9" Wiggle track	Track Parts	
2502	1971	9" Double cross track	Track Parts	
2503	1972	9" "Y" track	Track Parts	
2506	1971	9" "Cobblestone" track	Track Parts	
2514	1976	(2) 9" Radius 1/8	Track Parts	
2516	1971	7" Straight track	Track Parts	
2517	1975	(2) 9" Straight tracks	Track Parts	
2519	1979	(2) 9" Radius 1/4 Curve	Track Parts	
2523	1978	Intersection track	Track Parts	
2524	1976	9" Straight criss-cross track	Track Parts	
2526	1975	9" Lap Counter track	Track Parts	
2527	1979	6" Straight track	Track Parts	
2532	1979	Flex track	Track Parts	
2539	1971	9" "Squeeze" track	Track Parts	
2542	1975	(2) 15" Straight track	Track Parts	
2545	1975	12 inch RADIUS "DAYTONA" BANKED CURVE	Track Parts	
2550	1974	Starter track	Track Parts	
2551	1972	Pair 9" Adapter Tracks	Track Parts	
6052	1979	(2) 9" SpeedSteer Curved track	Track Parts	
6776	1979	SpeedSteer Pickup Shoes	Car Parts	
8501	1971	GEAR PLATE & ARM. with GEARS	Car Parts	
8507	1971	SPEEDWIND ARMATURE	Car Parts	
8509	1971	REVERSIBLE GUIDE PIN	Car Parts	
8515	1971	Idler Gear	Car Parts	
8516	1971	GEAR PLATE	Car Parts	
8521	1971	Pick-Up Shoes	Car Parts	
8524	1971	Front Wheels	Car Parts	
8527	1971	Rear Wheels	Car Parts	
8529	1971	CLUSTER GEAR SHAFT	Car Parts	
8530	1971	Cluster Gear	Car Parts	
8550	1972	Plastic bag/card	Packaging	
8552	1972	Super II Commutator Brush Tubes	Car Parts	
8555	1972	Super II Rear Axle	Car Parts	
8559	1972	Super II (2) Set Screws	Car Parts	
8560	1972	Super II (1) Set Screw Wrench	Car Parts	
8567	1972	Super II Plated Gear Clamp	Car Parts	
8569	1972	Super II O-Ring Front Tires	Car Parts	
8571	1972	Super II Reversible Guide Pin	Car Parts	
8572	1972	Super II Cluster Gear and Shaft	Car Parts	
8601	1978	Guide pin	Car Parts	
8602	1978	(2) Pickup shoe springs	Car Parts	
8603	1978	(2) Pickup shoes	Car Parts	
8604	1978	(2) Motor brushes	Car Parts	
8605	1978	(2) Motor brush springs	Car Parts	
8606	1978	(2) Magnets	Car Parts	
8607	1978	Armature	Car Parts	
8608	1978	Gear plate clamp	Car Parts	
8609	1978	Chassis	Car Parts	
8610	1978	Gear plate and cluster gear	Car Parts	
8611	1978	14-tooth idler gear; 24-tooth idler gear; 15-tooth crown gear	Car Parts	
8612	1978	Front axle; rear axle	Car Parts	
8613	1978	(2) Front wheels; (2) rear wheels	Car Parts	
8614	1978	(2) Front tires; (2) rear tires	Car Parts	
8615	1978	9-tooth pinion gear - Special chassis	Car Parts	
8616	1978	Front axle; rear axle - Special chassis	Car Parts	
8617	1978	(2) Front wheels; (2) rear wheels - Special chassis	Car Parts	
8622	1978	(2) Front tires; (2) rear tires - Special chassis	Car Parts	
8678	1973	Rear Narrow Axle	Car Parts	
8703	1974	Guide pin	Car Parts	
8705	1974	(2) Pickup shoe springs	Car Parts	
8711	1974	Gear plate and cluster gear	Car parts	
8712	1974	14-tooth idler gear	Car parts	
8713	1974	24-tooth idler gear	Car parts	
8714	1974	15-tooth idler gear	Car parts	
8715	1974	Front axle	Car parts	
8716	1974	(2) Front wheels	Car parts	
8717	1974	(2) Front tires	Car parts	
8718	1974	Rear axle	Car parts	
8719	1974	Rear wheels	Car parts	
8720	1974	(2) Rear tires	Car parts	
8723	1974	X2C Oiler	Car parts	
8731	1973	(6) Chassis Gear Plate - Special chassis	Car Parts	
8732	1973	Pinion Gear - Special chassis	Car Parts	
8733	1973	20-tooth Gear - Special chassis	Car Parts	
8734	1973	26-tooth Gear - Special chassis	Car Parts	
8735	1973	15-tooth Crown Gear - Special chassis	Car Parts	
8736	1973	Front axle - Special chassis	Car Parts	
8737	1973	(2) Front wheel - Special chassis	Car Parts	
8738	1973	(2) Front tires - Special chassis	Car Parts	
8739	1973	Rear Axle - Special chassis	Car Parts	
8740	1973	(2) Rear wheels - Special chassis	Car Parts	
8742	1973	(2) Rear tires - Special chassis	Car Parts	
8770	1974	Chassis	Car Parts	
8771	1974	(2) Magnets	Car Parts	
8772	1974	Gear plate clamp	Car Parts	
8773	1974	(2) Motor brush springs	Car Parts	
8774	1974	(2) Motor brushes	Car Parts	
8775	1974	(2) Pickup shoes	Car Parts	
8776	1974	(6) SPEC CHASSIS	Car Parts	
8777	1974	Armature	Car Parts	
8782	1975	(2) Guide Pins	Car Parts	
8788	1975	Std. Chassis Wheel Set	Car Parts	
8869	1976	AFX Axle set	Car Parts	
8885	1976	G PLUS Comm Brushes	Car Parts	
8888	1976	G PLUS Pickup Shoe springs	Car Parts	
8897	1976	G PLUS GUIDE PIN	Car Parts	
8995	1976	Super G+ Tune-Up Kit	Car Parts	
9011	1979	(2) Glow Guardrails	Track Parts	
