= West Gate Bridge =

Cable-stayed bridge across the Yarra River in Melbourne, Victoria, Australia

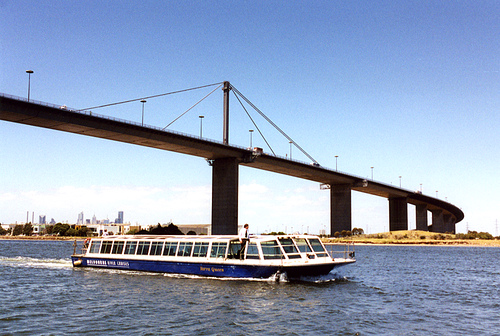
- The bridge with a river cruise boat passing underneath
- Coordinates: 37°49′46″S 144°53′53″E
- Carried: West Gate Freeway
- Crossed: Yarra River; Westgate Park
- Locale: Melbourne, Victoria, Australia
- Maintained by: Department of Transport and Planning
- ID number: WGB
- Preceded by: Bolte Bridge
- Followed by: n/a

Characteristics
- Design: Cable-stayed Box girder bridge
- Material: Steel
- Total length: 2,582.6 m (8,473 ft)
- Width: 37.3 m (122 ft) (max.)
- Longest span: 336 m (1,102 ft)
- Clearance below: 58 m (190 ft)
- No. of lanes: 10 (dual-carriageway); (5 inbound, 5 outbound; since 2011)

History
- Designer: Lower Yarra Crossing Authority (from 1972)
- Contracted lead designer: Freeman Fox & Partners (1968–1970); Flint & Neill (1972–1978; 2009–2011)
- Engineering design by: Sinclair Knight Merz (2009–2011)
- Constructed by: World Services and Construction (1968–1970); Redpath Dorman Long (1972–1978); John Holland (Constructions) (1972–1978)
- Fabrication by: World Services and Construction (1968–1970; 1972–1978)
- Built: 1968–1970; 1972–1978
- Construction cost: A$202 million (1978); A$347 million (2011)
- Opened: 15 November 1978; 48 years ago
- Rebuilt: 2009–2011
- Collapsed: 15 October 1970 (during construction)

Statistics
- Daily traffic: 205,000 (November 2023)

Location
- Interactive map of West Gate Bridge

The West Gate Bridge is a steel, box girder, cable-stayed bridge across the Yarra River, north of its mouth into Port Phillip, and Westgate Park, located in Melbourne, Victoria, Australia. The bridge carries the West Gate Freeway and links Melbourne's city centre with its western suburbs and Geelong, 80 kilometres (50 mi) to the south-west. Opened in 1978, the bridge has formed part of one of the busiest road corridors in Australia; and carried 203,000 vehicles per day, as of November 2023.

The bridge has a clearance of 58 metres (190 ft) below its main span to allow large cargo ships to access the Port of Melbourne. The total length of the bridge is 2,582.6 metres (8,473 ft), making it the fifth-longest bridge in Australia; the longest being Melbourne's Bolte Bridge at 5 kilometres (3.1 mi). The West Gate Bridge is twice as long as the Sydney Harbour Bridge and is one of the highest road decks in Australia, higher than Sydney Harbour Bridge's 49 metres (161 ft).

On 15 October 1970, dozens of workers were mid-construction on the bridge when it collapsed in what was Australia's deadliest industrial accident. Thirty-five men were killed and the lives of many more workers and their families were abruptly disrupted.

== Transportation ==
=== Motor vehicles ===
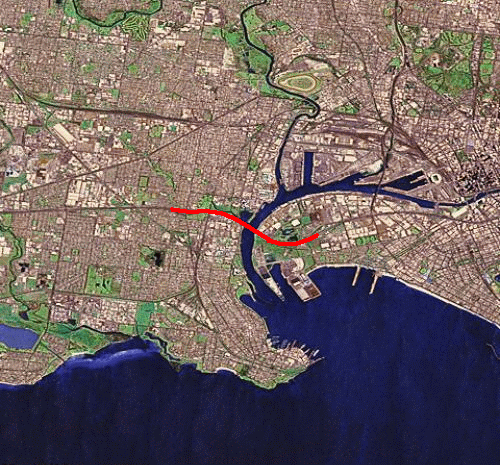
A map marking the course of the bridge and its approaches

The West Gate Bridge is a ten-lane dual-carriageway freeway bridge, carrying five lanes of vehicular traffic in each direction. The bridge carries a very high volume; and as of November 2023, carried approximately 203,000 vehicles per day; making the bridge and freeway one of the busiest road corridors in Australia.

The bridge and freeway was, until December 2025, the only main direct link between Melbourne's city centre and the west, resulting in frequent traffic congestion during the morning and afternoon peaks and was constantly busy due to the number of vehicles accessing the Melbourne's ports. The bridge was tolled from 1978 until 1985, when John Cain's government, following an election promise, discontinued tolls on the bridge. Since December 2025, when the West Gate Tunnel was opened and bypassed the bridge, there has been little to no alleviation of traffic movements on the bridge.

The bridge is windswept as there are no significant obstructing terrain features for some distance, particularly in the quadrant from south to west, a common wind direction. High prevailing winds have led to issues for motorbikes, trucks and other high-sided vehicles. A wind warning light system was implemented at the bridge approaches to control traffic (amber – bridge closed to motorbikes and high vehicles; red – closed to all traffic), until an upgrade between 2008 and 2011 that implemented a variable speed limit system – from 80 kilometres per hour (50 mph) to either 60 or 40 kilometres per hour (37 or 25 mph), depending on the prevailing wind conditions.

=== Cycling ===
Cyclists are prohibited from using the bridge except for special bicycle events, notably the Melbourne Summer Cycle and the Around the Bay in a Day. The Westgate Punt is a foot ferry that runs directly below the bridge, taking cyclists and pedestrians across the Yarra between a jetty at Fishermans Bend near Westgate Park – Bay Trail and a jetty adjacent to Scienceworks Museum – Hobsons Bay Coastal Trail. It operates on demand, from Monday to Friday in morning and evening peaks, and on weekends and public holidays from 10:00 am to 5:00 pm.

== History ==
=== Proposals and realisation ===
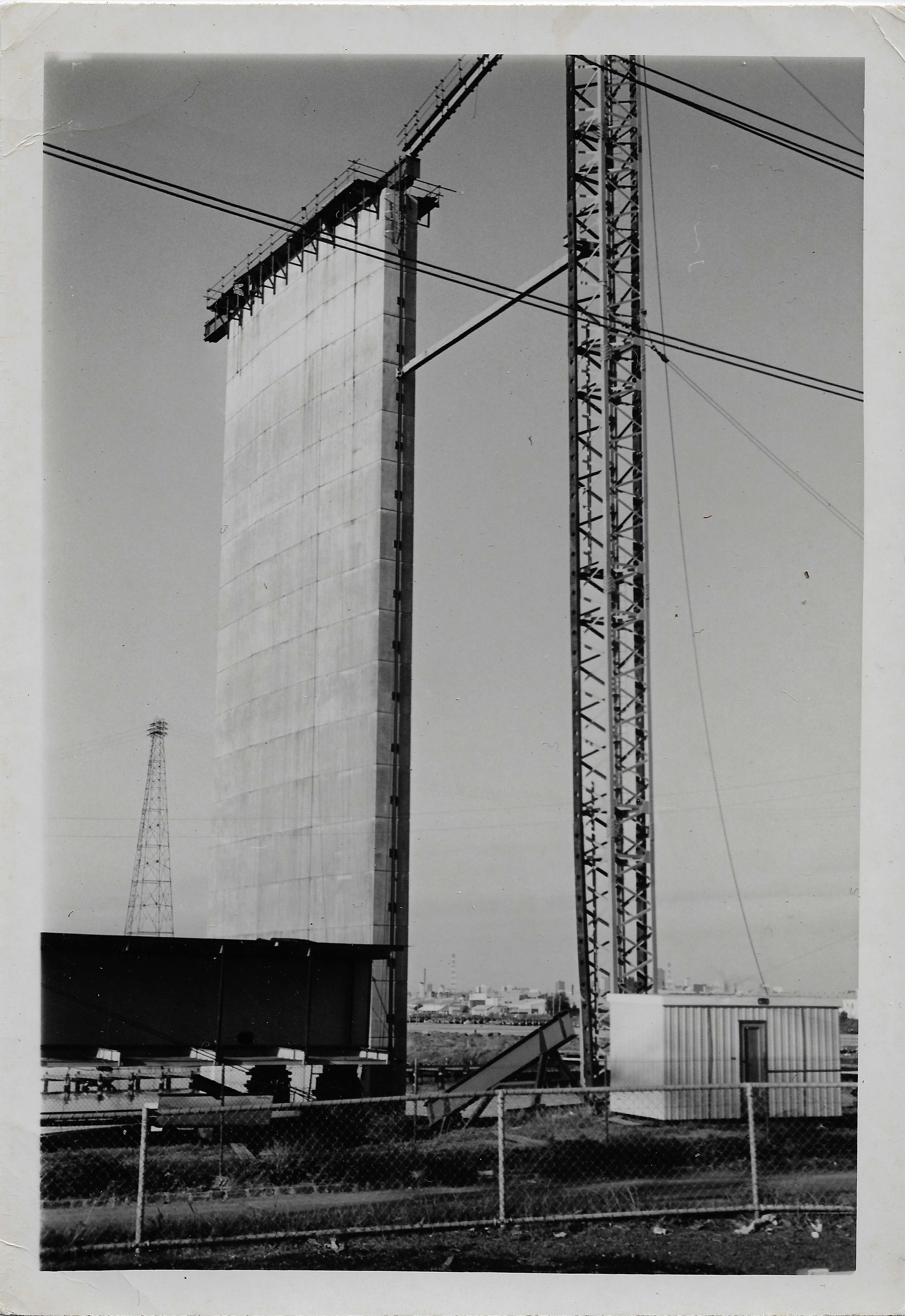
A single column of the bridge during construction, undated

The notion of a Lower Yarra River Crossing has formal origins as early as 1888, when Victoria’s Public Works Department first proposed a tunnel under the Yarra. The Metropolitan Town Planning Commission's Plan of General Development proposed a bridge for a road between Geelong Road ('west of Kororoit Creek') and Ingles St, Port Melbourne. Road routes between central Melbourne and the west were, however, bridged further north, and the usual method of crossing at the lower Yarra was via skiffs until 1912, when ferries were first instituted, the Newport steam ferry operated by the City of Williamstown taking prominence between 1931 and 1974.

The Western Industries Association was formed in August 1957 and claimed to be ‘representative of all industries in Altona, Footscray, Sunshine, Werribee and Williamstown districts’. Having formed a sub-committee to investigate a Yarra crossing, in 1958 it asked Victorian Premier Henry Bolte ‘to give urgent consideration to construction of a traffic tunnel under the Yarra.’ The association had been told by 'shipping interests' that a bridge would not be acceptable for the crossing. The tunnel, it was suggested, would carry 30 000 cars a day; differing estimates on the capacity of the 'overtaxed' ferry suggested it could only handle between 1 200 and 2 000. The Victorian Government's response to the proposal, delivered by Commissioner for Public Works Thomas Maltby, was that the government's finances were inadequate to undertake a crossing urgently and that any such project would require private investment. In 1961 Lower Yarra Crossing Limited was formed, a non-profit company to develop the crossing. In mid-1960 it was announced that the association would raise the money to construct the bridge with government support keeping interest rates low; the arrangement was envisaged as not, in itself, profit-making. In this year, the Western Industries Association applied to government for license to construct and operate a crossing on a toll basis.

In 1961 the Western Industries Association formed Lower Yarra Crossing Ltd. Test drilling began late in that year by which point the association once again became publicly open to the construction of a bridge, rather than a tunnel. Nevertheless Danish tunnel engineering firm Christiani and Nielson were engaged as consultants. Chief amongst the concerns regarding a tunnel was the limitation on particular goods or cargoes – notably, flammable material –ar goods or cargoes - notably, flammable mat that could legally, or safely, be carried through a tunnel.

In the state government's analysis, the cost of building a bridge or a tunnel would be equal, however, notwithstanding the Harbour Trust's strong advocacy for a tunnel, it was felt by those in power that a bridge would more readily allow use by petrol tankers. The Lower Yarra Crossing Authority was granted a franchise by an act of Parliament and in 1968 construction started on the West Gate Bridge. It was noted by the press at the time that the location of the bridge's eastern approaches would require the removal of the Fishermen's Bend airstrip.'

== Collapse ==
2010 ABC YV report on the collapse

Two years into construction of the bridge, at 11:50 am on 15 October 1970, the 112-metre (367 ft) span between piers 10 and 11 collapsed and fell 50 metres (160 ft) to the ground and water below. Thirty-five construction workers died and eighteen were injured, and was Australia's worst industrial accident. Many of those who died were on lunch break beneath the structure in workers' huts, which were crushed by the falling span. Others were working on and inside the span when it fell. The whole 2,000-tonne (2,200-short-ton) mass plummeted into the Yarra River mud with an explosion of gas, dust and mangled metal that shook buildings hundreds of metres away. Nearby houses were spattered with flying mud. The roar of the impact, the explosion, and the fire that followed, could be clearly heard over 20 kilometres (12 mi) away. On the following morning, 16 October, Premier Sir Henry Bolte, announced that a royal commission would be set up immediately to look into the cause of the disaster. Prime Minister John Gorton, said: "I am sure the whole of Australia is shocked and saddened by the serious accident at West Gate Bridge. Please extend my deepest sympathy to all those families to whom this tragic event has brought such grief."

=== Cause ===
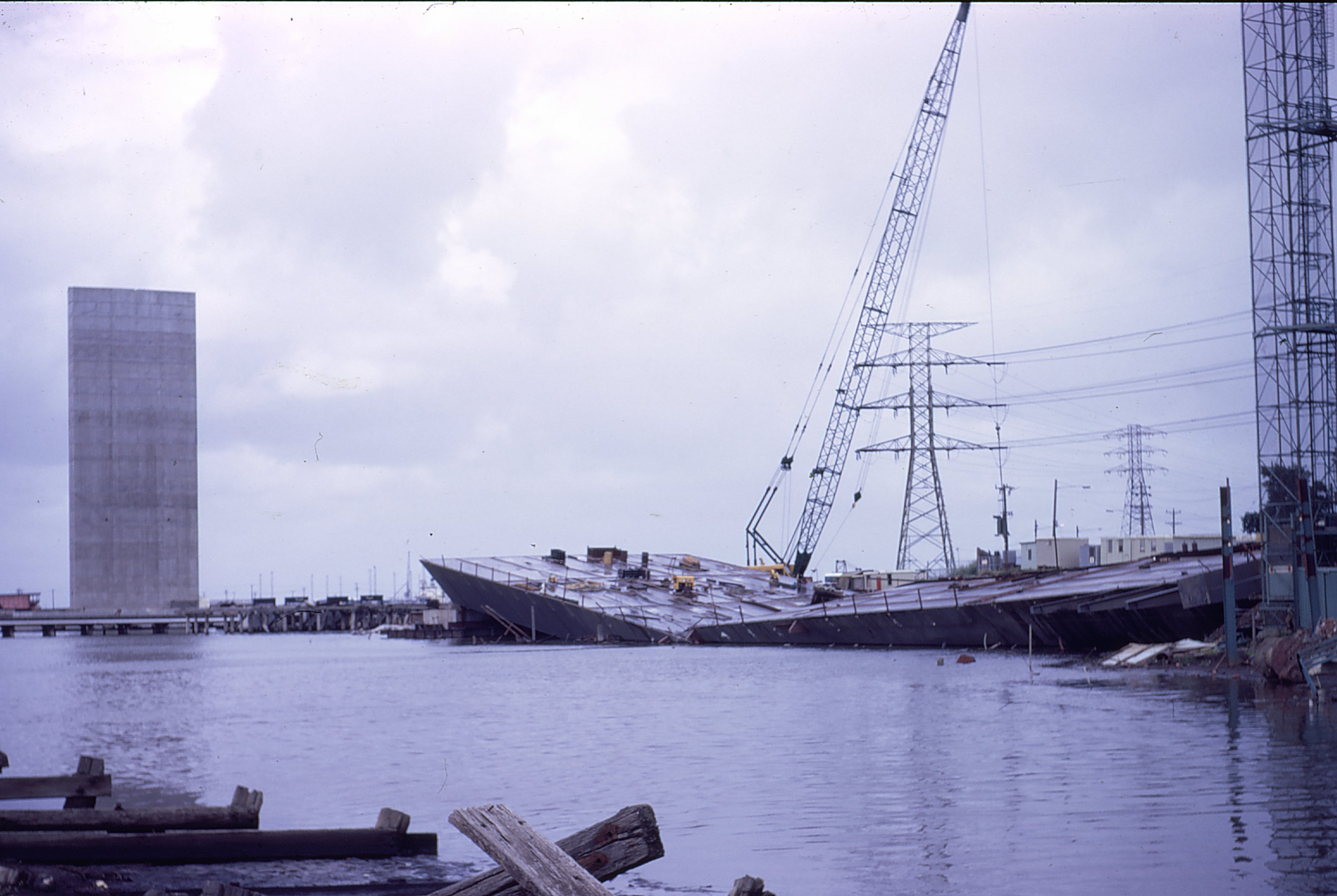
Bridge span after collapse, undated

The royal commission concluded on 14 July 1971. It attributed the failure of the bridge to two causes: the structural design by designers Freeman Fox & Partners, and an unusual method of construction by World Services and Construction, the original contractors for the project.

On the day of the collapse, there was a difference in camber of 11.4 centimetres (4.5 in) between two half-girders at the west end of the span which needed to be joined. It was proposed that the higher one be weighted down with 10 concrete blocks, each weighing 8 tonnes (8.8 short tons), which were located on-site. The weight of those blocks caused the span to buckle, which was a sign of structural failure. The longitudinal joining of the half-girders was partially complete when orders were given to remove the buckle by unbolting the upper flange along the splice between boxes 4 and 5, allowing the plates forming the upper flange to slide over one another. The removal of the bolts created a stress concentration that the bridge could not withstand, owing to inadequate factors of safety in the design. The bridge collapsed approximately an hour later.

The disaster shifted the balance of industrial relations in Australia. Subsequently, unions pushed for stronger roles in safety negotiations, statutory occupational health and safety committees, and mandatory site inspections involving worker representatives. Safety training, incident reporting and grief counselling became integral parts of workplace management. In the decades since, these reforms have saved countless lives on Australian building sites.

=== Collapse memorials ===
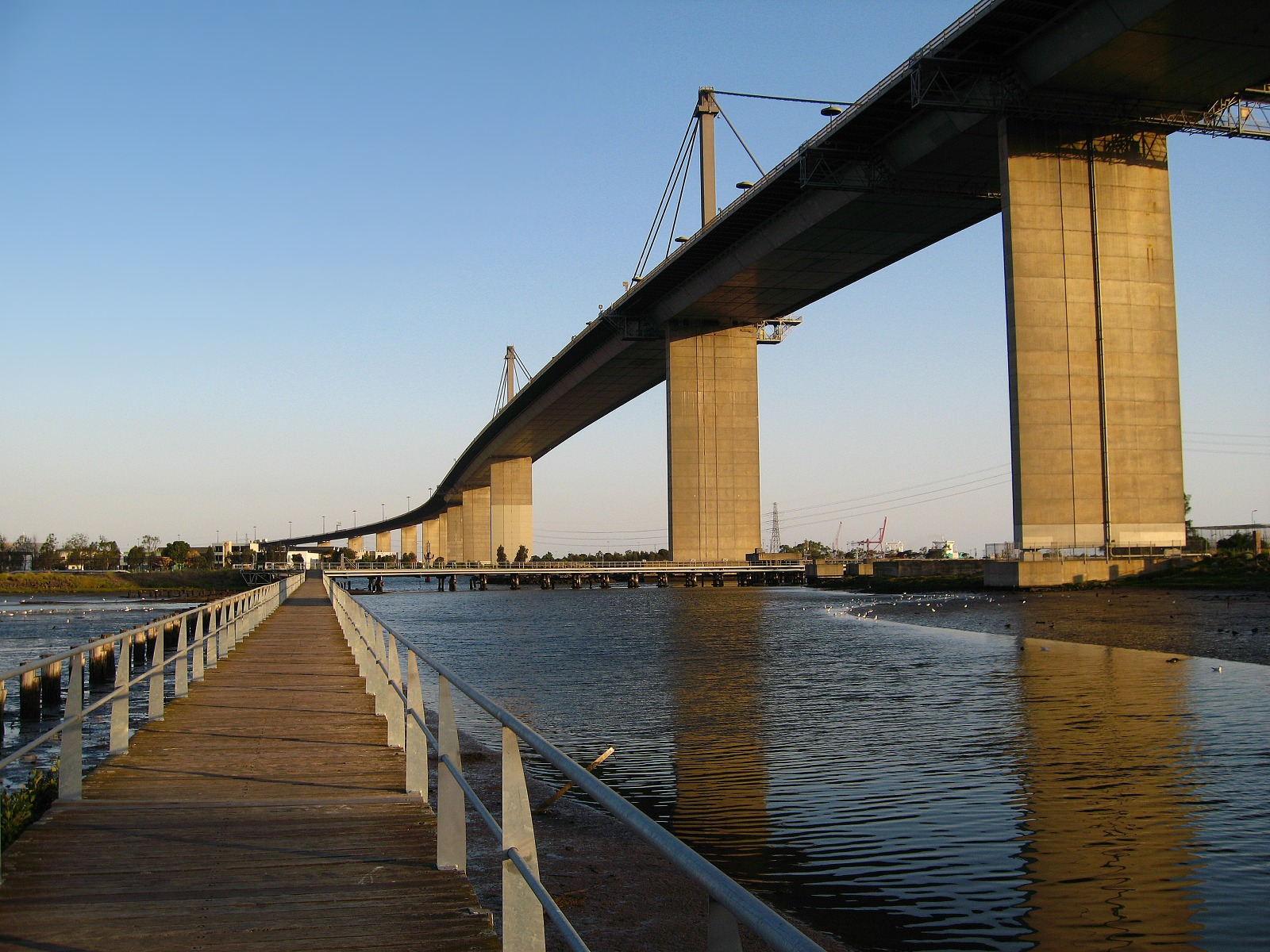
The bridge as seen from the walkway near the West Gate Bridge Memorial Park

Six twisted fragments of the collapsed bridge can be found in the West Gate garden at the engineering faculty of Monash University, Clayton campus. The university acquired them after being asked to participate in the investigation of the collapse. It is said that they are to remind engineers of the consequences of their errors.

Commemorations have been held on 15 October every year since the collapse. A West Gate Bridge Memorial Park is located near the bridge. It opened on 15 October 2004, the 34th anniversary of the collapse and includes the West Gate Bridge Memorial and Sculpture, and a memorial for six people who died in the Spotswood sewer tunnel collapse of 12 April 1895.

=== Completion ===
Three other steel box girder bridges collapsed during their construction between 1969 and 1971: the Fourth Danube Bridge in Vienna on 6 November 1969; Cleddau Bridge (Milford Haven), Wales on 2 June 1970; and the South Bridge over the Rhine River in Koblenz on 10 November 1971. The UK government responded by setting up the Merrison Committee of Inquiry, headed by Sir Alec Merrison. The Merrison Committee provided an interim report in May 1971, and a final report in February 1973 on new design and workmanship rules for steel box-girder bridges.

Following the publication of the report of the royal commission in August 1971, the Lower Yarra Crossing Authority, a non-profit company, formed its own Directorate of Engineering. In September 1971, Hans G. Wolfram FIEAust, a Director of Gutteridge, Haskins & Davey, was appointed the Director of Engineering, and was responsible for the re-design, supervision of construction, and contract administration of West Gate Bridge until its completion. The Chairman of the Lower Yarra Crossing Authority was Oscar G. Meyer; and the Deputy Chairman was Bernard J. Callinan, who was also Chairman of the Technical Committee. In 1971, the authority was renamed as the West Gate Bridge Authority.

Intensive reviews of the structure focused attention on the inadequate strength of the original design of the bridge's deck. This consisted of a 100-millimetre (3.9 in) reinforced concrete slab acting compositely with a steel deck plate stiffened by bulb flats. Numerous proposals were examined and Wolfram recommended replacing the original steel and concrete deck by a lighter and stronger orthotropic steel deck as technically and economically the most appropriate solution. This orthotropic deck is a steel plate stiffened longitudinally by closely spaced cellular troughs and laterally, at intervals, by cross beams. The proof engineer was Karlheinz Roik, a professor of steel construction at TU Berlin. Roik independently checked the re-design of the West Gate Bridge in accordance with the recommendations of the royal commission. The re-design was also checked against the German code DIN 4114 and the Appraisal Rules of the Merrison Committee's reports. The re-design was endorsed by four other university professors of civil engineering: F. B. Bull (Adelaide), N. W. Murray (Monash), J. W. Roderick (Sydney) and L. K. Stevens (Melbourne).

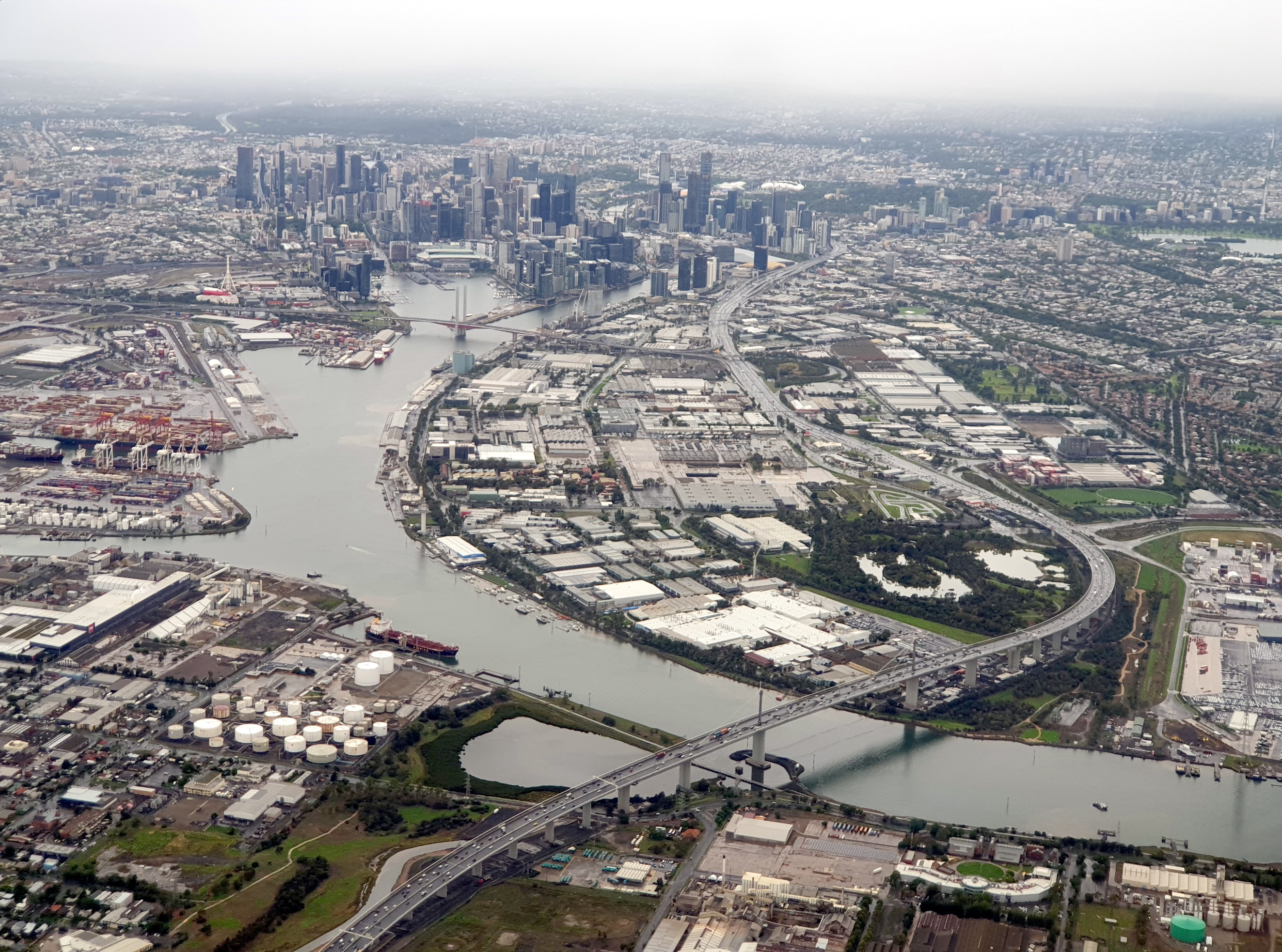
An aerial view of the bridge, looking east towards the city centre, in 2020. Bolte Bridge can be seen in the middle distance

Construction resumed in 1972 with World Services and Construction continuing to fabricate the boxes and to carry out their sub-assembly, but with a joint venture between Redpath Dorman Long and John Holland (Constructions) completing the construction of the steel portion of the bridge. Additional strengthening of the structure had to be designed for the erection because the stresses could exceed those of the in-service condition. The joint venture contractor engaged Flint & Neill of London for this and their design was proof-checked by the Directorate of Engineering.

Charles, Prince of Wales visited the West Gate Bridge project in October 1974 and met with members of the West Gate Bridge Authority and workers.

After ten years of construction, the bridge was completed in 1978 at a cost of $202 million.

== Developments following opening ==
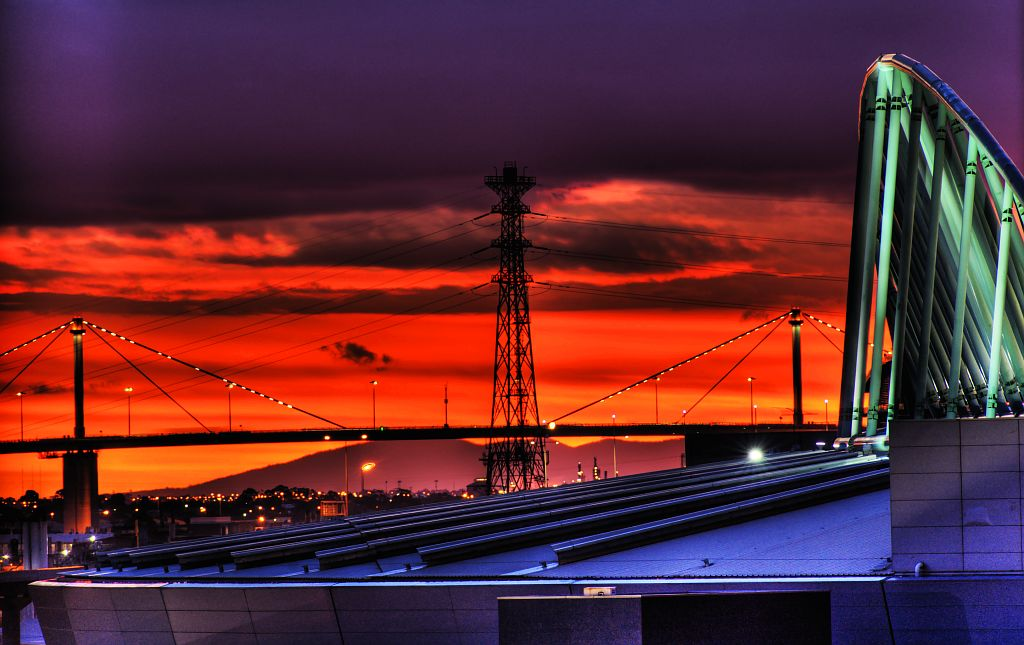
The bridge at sunset, with Docklands Stadium in the foreground

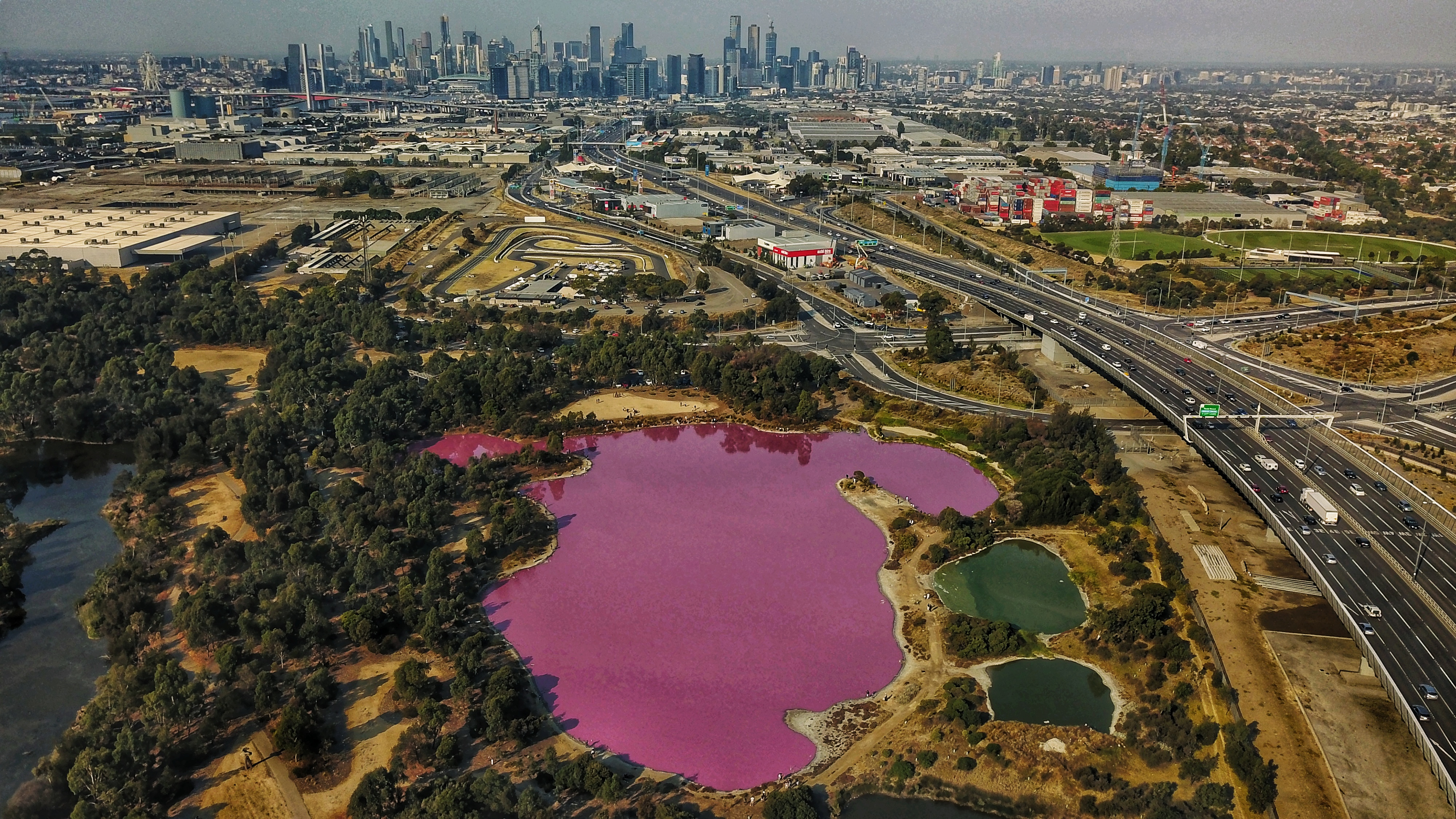
Westgate Park's saltwater lake near the bridge turned pink, Summer 2019

Strong growth in suburbs along the route and increased freight through the Port of Melbourne, resulted in the corridor experiencing traffic congestion during peak periods, and the bridge was vulnerable to short-term interruptions, and impacted capacity. Various proposals to abate congestion by allowing more traffic included widening the bridge, a tunnel underneath the river, or adding a second deck to the bridge. Many such plans came under fire from community groups such as the Public Transport Users Association and Environment Victoria, which advocated investment in alternative forms of transport.

A private sector report, made public in February 2006, suggested building a companion tunnel to the West Gate Bridge under the Yarra River, made up of three separate bores to carry traffic in either direction and a freight rail line. The portals would have been north of Williamstown Road in Port Melbourne, and between Blackshaws and Melbourne roads in Altona North.

=== Traffic controls ===
Speed cameras were erected on the bridge in 2004, but were not activated until September 2005, due to issues with a similar camera on the Western Ring Road. However these speed cameras were switched off in 2005, and currently remain disabled, as the sway of the bridge prevents secondary verification of the alleged speed against a fixed point. In 2006 the government spent $1.3 million on erecting railway style boom barriers at each entrance to the bridge to block traffic in the event of a terrorist attack.

=== Structural weaknesses ===
On 5 August 2007, it was reported that the Victorian government was planning a $240 million project to identify and eliminate structural weaknesses in the bridge, with specific concerns including crash barriers, cracking, corrosion and potential buckling. News of the work was prompted by the collapse of the I-35W Mississippi River bridge in Minneapolis. Experts were reported as saying the West Gate was initially designed to carry loads of 25 tonnes (55,000 lb) but now carried B-double trucks weighing up to 68 tonnes (150,000 lb). The bridge was built to carry 40,000 vehicles a day; however, volumes grew to more than four times the original number, with approximately 160,000 vehicles per day in 2007; and 203,000 vehicles per day, as of November 2023.

=== Expansion, 2009–2011 ===
On 17 May 2006, the Victorian government as part of its "Meeting Our Transport Challenges" announced plans to change traffic flow in peak periods on the West Gate Bridge and approaches to it, using a reversible lane to provide five traffic lanes in the peak direction, opposing traffic having three lanes. This was to be done using overhead signals and barriers; the State Government allocated funds to this project in its 2006–2007 state budget, but the works were never carried out.

In 2008 the expansion plans were revised as part of the Victorian Transport Plan, when it was announced that the bridge would be widened to five lanes in each direction, the space being gained by narrowing the existing traffic lanes and closing the emergency lanes, in a move criticised by Victorian fire, police and ambulance unions. Overhead gantries would be used to direct traffic out of lanes when breakdowns and accidents occur. Costed at $240 million, each lane would be 3.1 metres (10 ft) wide; by comparison, lanes on the Sydney Harbour Bridge were 2.8 metres (9.2 ft) wide. Roads Minister Tim Pallas claimed that the plan would allow the bridge to carry fifty per cent more vehicles, while reducing crashes by twenty per cent. Structural analysis work on the bridge concluded in early 2009, and was completed over a 14-month period. Works to strengthen the bridge commenced in the first half of 2009, with the entire strengthening project scheduled for completion in 2011.

On 22 June 2011, all five lanes were opened to the public in both directions, with the completion of the required strengthening works. The full cost was $347 million, $107 million more than VicRoads had originally planned, with considerable additional scope of works. This cost increase was after the deletion of $20 million architectural lighting originally included in the scope. The engineers for the strengthening project, Flint & Neill and Sinclair Knight Merz, won the 2012 Institution of Structural Engineers Supreme Award for structural engineering for the project.

=== Flags ===
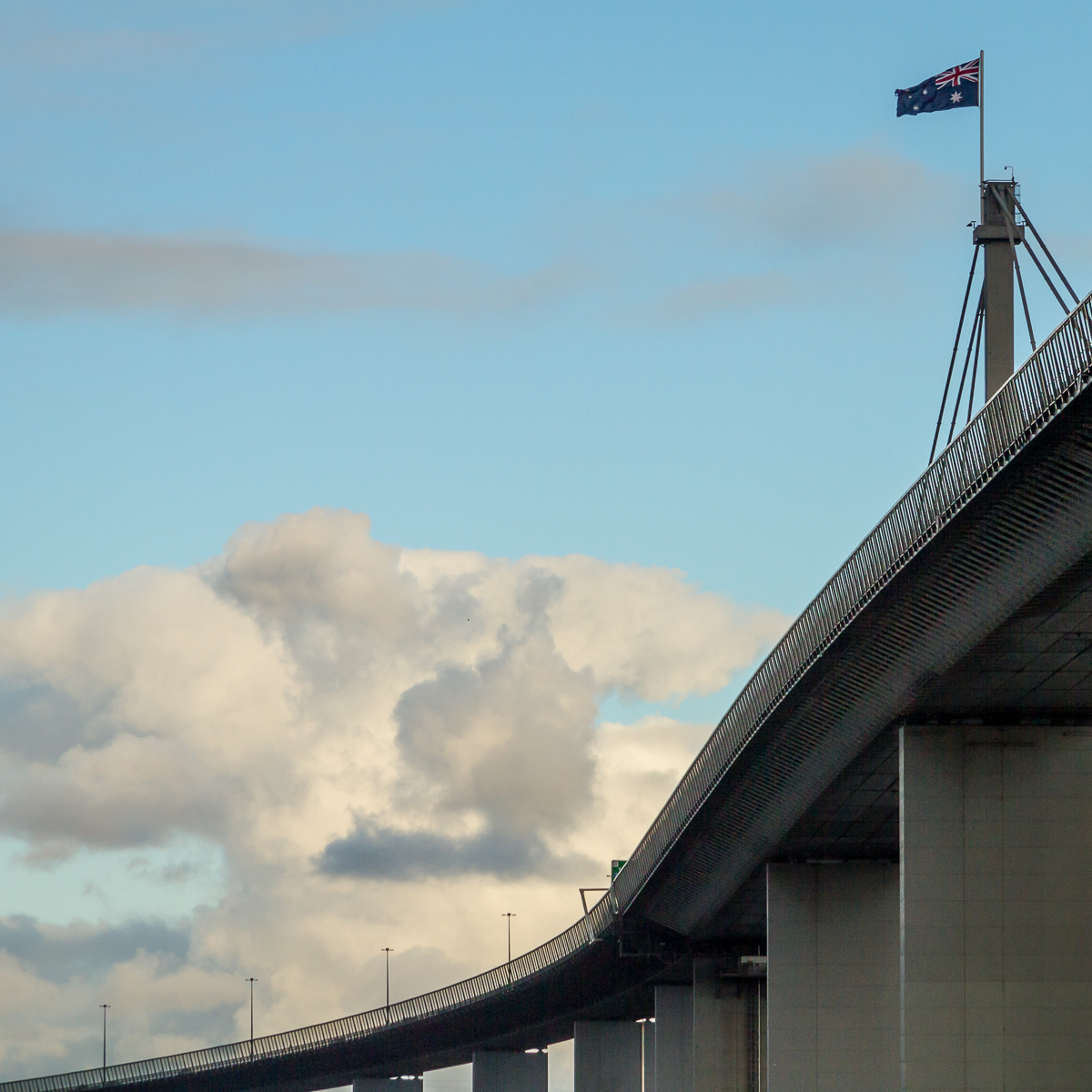
The Australian flag on the bridge in 2016

In March 2007, the government announced that two flagpoles would be erected atop the main bridge pylons, to fly the Australian and Victorian flags, each being 10 by 5 metres (33 by 16 ft) in size and 135 metres (443 ft) AHD. The flagpoles cost $350,000 to install, were projected to cost $15,000 annually to maintain, and were unfurled on 24 September 2008.

On 11 March 2014, a 10-metre-high (33 ft) artist-designed flag was raised on the western side of the bridge as part of the "Melbourne Now" exhibition, On Top of the World: Flags for Melbourne. The flag was a collaborative design between four contributing artists—Brook Andrew, Helen Johnson, Kate Daw and Jon Campbell—who shared an affinity with the bridge. The flag design is a reference to 1803 maritime communications by Rear Admiral Home Riggs Popham, the symbol on the flag meaning "I can spare what you asked for". The flag was flown until the end of the "Melbourne Now" show on 25 March 2014.

Since July 2022, the Aboriginal flag has flown over the bridge alongside the Australian flag permanently. The cost of installing the flag was not disclosed.

=== West Gate Tunnel ===
The Victorian government also assessed options for the development of another east–west link in 2008. Sir Rod Eddington headed the assessment of the future east–west connections for public transport, road and freight travel for the entire Monash-West Gate corridor. In December 2008, the government announced it was planning for such a link, anticipated to be a three-kilometre (2 mi) road tunnel under Footscray and the Maribyrnong River. Linking Dynon and Footscray Roads in the Port of Melbourne precinct to Geelong Road in West Footscray, now known as the East-West Link, its cost was estimated in 2008 as $10 billion.

In 2018, work began on the West Gate Tunnel that was designed to provide an alternative to the West Gate Bridge. The tunnel opened in December 2025.

== Suicides ==
Owing to its height, the bridge became a popular location for suicides, with police data in the early 2000s showing up to one suicide occurring every three weeks at the West Gate Bridge. A 2004 coroner's report recommended anti-suicide fencing or barriers be erected on the bridge to deter people from attempting to end their lives.

Those who argued for a suicide barrier claimed that most of those who jump from the West Gate Bridge do so through impulse, and that police officers who tried to save jumpers were putting their own lives in danger. There were reported incidents of police officers dangling off the side of the bridge while holding onto would-be jumpers. A 2000 Royal Melbourne Hospital study on people who jumped from the bridge found at least 62 cases between 1991 and 1998. Seven people survived the 58-metre (190 ft) fall. Around 74 per cent of those who jumped from the bridge were male, with an average age of 33. More than 70 per cent were suffering from mental illness. Of those who jumped off the West Gate Bridge, 31 per cent fell onto land. Some of those who landed in water drowned afterwards.

=== Installation of anti-suicide fencing ===
In June 2008, Gabriela Garcia jumped off the West Gate Bridge with her 22-month-old son Oliver, and their bodies were found on the river bank below.

Seven months later on 29 January 2009, a 4-year-old girl, Darcey Freeman, was thrown off the bridge by her father, Arthur Freeman. She survived the fall but later died in hospital. Freeman was found guilty of murder and sentenced to life in prison in April 2011; the apparent trigger for the incident was his recent separation and apparent fear of loss of access to the children (similar to the 2005 Robert Farquarson case).

A week after that incident, on 5 February 2009, 17-year-old Allem Halkic jumped from the inbound lanes near the Todd Road exit on the Port Melbourne side of the bridge. On walking up the bridge he was reported to have said to the VicRoads operator via the emergency phone, "You better get someone here before I jump". Police responded within minutes of this, but were too late to save Halkic and found his body in the Westgate Park below. The case was significant as Halkic was a victim of cyberbullying in the days prior to this, and reportedly became the first death resulting from cyberbullying in Victoria. In October 2011 a coronial inquest was held into the death, again recommending (among other things) the installation of anti-suicide barriers on the bridge.

Following these incidents, a temporary suicide barrier of concrete crash barriers topped with a welded mesh fence was erected from February 2009. A permanent metal mesh barrier was subsequently installed along the length of the bridge in 2010–11 at a cost of $20 million. The barrier is reported to have reduced suicides from the bridge by 85 per cent.

== In popular culture ==
In 2026, the Melbourne Theatre Company performed the play, West Gate, written by Dennis McIntosh and directed by Iain Sinclair.

== See also ==
- List of disasters in Australia by death toll
- List of bridge disasters
- Erskine Bridge
- Tasman Bridge
- Suicide bridge

| Next bridge upstream | Yarra River | Next bridge downstream |
| Bolte Bridge (vehicles only) | West Gate Bridge | n/a |
