= Holden Commodore SS =

Holden Commodore SS is one of the following models of car:

- Commodore SS sports variant of Holden Commodore (VH), the third iteration of the first generation of this car (1982–1984)
- Commodore SS sports variant of Holden Commodore (VK), the fourth iteration of the first generation of this car (1984–1986)
- Commodore SS sports variant of Holden Commodore (VL), the fifth iteration of the first generation of this car (1986–1988)
- Commodore SS sports variant of Holden Commodore (VN), the first iteration of the second generation of this car (1988–1991)
- Commodore SS sports variant of Holden Commodore (VP), the second iteration of the second generation of this car (1991–1993)
- Commodore SS sports variant of Holden Commodore (VR), the third iteration of the second generation of this car (1993–1995)
- Commodore SS sports variant of Holden Commodore (VS), the fourth iteration of the second generation of this car (1995–1997)
- Commodore SS sports variant of Holden Commodore (VT), the first iteration of the third generation of this car (1997–2000)
- Commodore SS sports variant of Holden Commodore (VX), the second iteration of the third generation of this car (2000–2002)
- Commodore SS sports variant of Holden Commodore (VY), the third iteration of the third generation of this car (2002–2004)
- Commodore SS sports variant of Holden Commodore (VZ), the fourth iteration of the third generation of this car (2004–2006)
- Commodore SS sports variant of Holden Commodore (VE), the first iteration of the fourth generation of this car (2006–2013)
- Commodore SS sports variant of Holden Commodore (VF), the second iteration of the fourth generation of this car (2013–2017)

== See also ==
- Holden SS, about the 'SS' designator as used by GM Holden Ltd in their cars
- Chevrolet SS, an export version of the VF-generation Holden Commodore SS
- Chevrolet SS (concept car), a 2003 concept car unrelated to Holden Commodore SS
