= Westgate Park (Victoria) =

Park in Melbourne, Australia

- Interactive map of Westgate Park
- Type: Urban park
- Location: Melbourne, Victoria, Australia
- Coordinates: 37°49′56″S 144°54′21″E
- Area: 40 hectares (99 acres)
- Opened: 1985
- Designer: Oscar Meyers
- Owner: Parks Victoria
- Open: 24/7
- Status: Open all year

Westgate Park is a public park in Port Melbourne, Victoria, 6 km (3.7 mi) southwest of the Melbourne central business district and covering 40 hectares (0.40 km^{2}) of land. The park is located near Fishermans Bend, an industrial district along the left banks of the lower Yarra River downstream of the Maribyrnong River confluence, and is namesaked for the West Gate Bridge that traverses over the park's southern end.

== History ==
=== Pre-European settlement ===
The part of Melbourne on which the park is currently was formed over 30 million years ago by volcanic action. Evidence suggests that about 4,000 years ago, Fisherman's Bend and large areas of central Melbourne were under water.

=== 20th century ===
A significant portion of what is now Westgate Park was the site of the Fishermen's Bend Aerodrome established in the late 1930s but reduced in importance in 1953 with the opening of Avalon Airport.

The inspiration for Westgate Park is credited to Oscar Meyer, chair of the West Gate Bridge Authority between 1965 and 1981. Meyer, who died in harness in 1981, hoped to create ‘a beautiful park straddling the Yarra River to complement his sculptural bridge’. The Federal Government funded the development of the park to mark Victoria's sesquicentenary in 1984. Landscaping and design was completed by Loder and Bailey. It was officially opened a year later.

In late 1985 Barbara Fih reported in the Melbourne Age that Westgate Park:

has been completed to its first stage - basic earth forming and the shaping of lakes and lagoons has been done for the bushland setting. Now the paths must be constructed, and the railway line for the small steam train which will carry people from the park to the river bank, where one day they will be able to catch a ferry to the opposite side.

== Wildlife ==
Since the park's opening, it has become a haven for wildlife, providing refuge for many different bird species including several species of honeyeaters and parrots, teals, stilts, moorhens, swans, dotterels and wrens. Extensive plantings of indigenous trees and shrubs have been undertaken at Westgate Park. These species have been planted as part of a rejuvenation plan in the area.

== Features and attractions ==
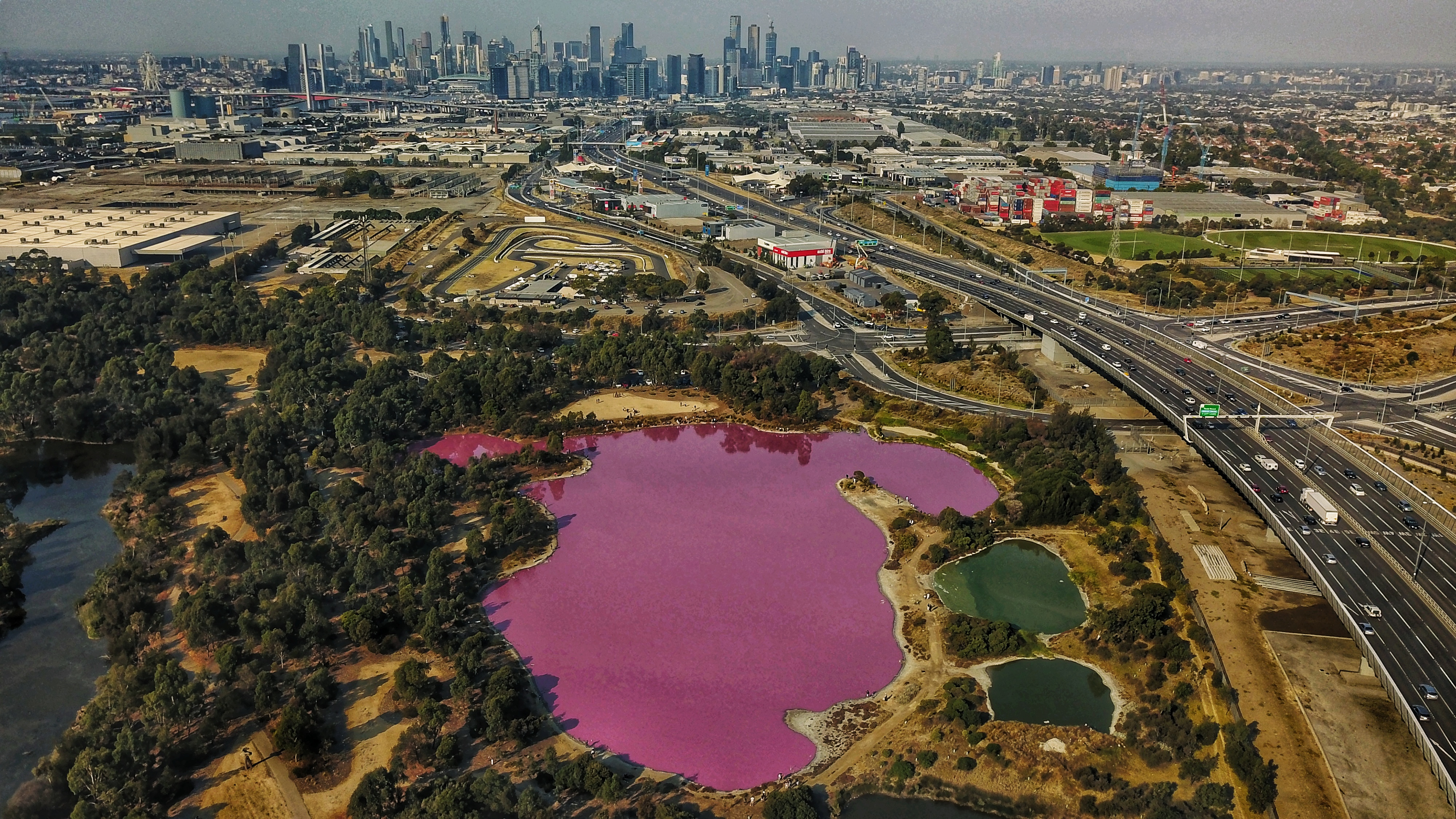
The lake during the period in which it is pink.

Westgate Park has numerous facilities such as picnic areas and spaces for bird watching. There are also many winding paths that follow along the Yarra River which are popular with walkers, cyclists and joggers. These paths link up with the Port Melbourne Foreshore Trail and the Main Yarra Trail.

The park has two lakes 70 m (230 ft) apart from each other, named Fresh Water Lake and Salt Water Lake respectively, surrounded by a series of smaller ponds and wetlands. The northern and slightly larger Fresh Water Lake has two islands (the larger one called the Ibis Island) and several grassy islets. The more featureless Salt Water Lake however is famous for turning pink seasonally as a result of high salt levels, high temperatures, increased sunlight as well as lack of rainfall, which lead to carotenoid-producing (which gives the distinct orange-pink color) halophile (haloarchaea and some algae) blooms. During the hotter months, algae can even grow in the salt crusts. During the cooler, rainier months, the lake returns to normal color.

== Hiking trails ==
There are a few trails that are available to walk within Westgate Park. The two most popular are:

The Westgate Park Nature Loop which is a 2.6 km loop trail which takes about 30 minutes to complete. This trail is popular with bird watchers, hikers and walkers.

The Westgate Park via Yarra River Trail. This trail is slightly longer, at 4 km and takes about 53 minutes to complete. This route is more popular with runners, but hikers and walkers frequent the trail also.

== Use for raves ==
Due to its distance from residential property - and thus passive surveillance - but its proximity to the centre of Melbourne, Westgate Park is a favoured spot for raves. Reports suggest that 'hundreds of youths' periodically descend on the area for this purpose. Littering, and harm to wildlife, are seen as a particular problem.
