= Holden Salisbury differential =

Automobile axle

The Holden Salisbury Differential is an automobile differential manufactured by Holden at its Melbourne plant. It was introduced in 1948 and installed in Holden's debut model, the Holden 48-215 and other models until production of the VL Commodore ceased in 1988. The Salisbury assembly is similar to that on a typical passenger car.

The differential was named after the Salisbury Wheel Company which was founded in the USA in 1901. In 1905, the company started manufacturing front axles, and two years later added rear axles to its product line. It was acquired by Spicer in 1919. In 1970 the Salisbury Axle group was renamed the Spicer Axle Division, though the style of housing continued to be referred to as the Salisbury type.

The Holden Salisbury type diff began to be phased out with the introduction of the VL Commodore, replaced by the BorgWarner BW78, colloquially known as the 8-bolt diff due to the 8 bolts holding the cover on.

== Ratios ==
- 2.60:1 (Salisbury only)
- 2.78:1
- 3.08:1
- 3.36:1
- 3.55:1
- 3.90:1 (Banjo only)
- 4.44:1 (Salisbury only)

== Axles ==
- Coarse spline
- 28 spline
- 31 spline

== Stud patterns ==
- 5x4.25" (48-HG, Brougham, HK-HG Monaro & Torana)
- 5x4.75" (HQ-WB, Statesman, HQ-HZ Monaro & Torana A9X & L34)
- 5x120 (VB-VL Commodore)

== Applications ==
- 1948-1968 Holden Standard
- 1953-1968 Holden Special
- 1962-1980 Holden Premier
- 1968-1977 Holden Belmont
- 1968-1980 Holden Kingswood
- 1968-1971 Holden Brougham
- 1968-1976 Holden Monaro
- 1969-1982 Holden Torana
- 1971-1984 Holden One Tonner
- 1971-1984 Statesman
- 1972 Holden SS (based upon the HQ Belmont V8)
- 1974-1980 Holden Sandman (based upon Belmont and Kingswood Models)
- 1979-1988 Holden Commodore

== See also ==
- 10.5" Corporate 14 Bolt Differential
- Ford 9-inch axle
