= Melbourne Summer Cycle =

The MS Melbourne Summer Cycle is a social ride held in Melbourne, Victoria, Australia. The ride is a benefit for those living with multiple sclerosis.

There are two course options - the 30 km and 50 km routes both taking in the sights of Melbourne city centre as well as crossing over the West Gate Bridge, starting and finishing at Princes Park, Carlton. The first event was held in 2007; since then thousands of people have participated.

Cyclists can enter as a team or individual. The start is staggered and participants can select to start at 7:00am, 7:20am, 7:40am or 8:00am. Depending on how quickly you cycle and how many stops you make along the way it will take between 1.5 and 4 hours to complete. There are three official rest stops on the course and all participants must adhere to Victorian road rules at all times.

In 2015, the MS Melbourne Cycle raised almost $500,000 for people living with multiple sclerosis.

2023 saw the last edition of the event. It was announced, via their website, that there were no current plans for the MS Melbourne Run+ Ride Festival to return.
