= Holden Fishermans Bend Plant =

Industrial park opened in 1936

Coordinates: 37.824770°S 144.921560°E

Fishermans Bend Assembly Plant
- Built: 1936
- Location: Fishermans Bend, Melbourne
- Industry: Motor vehicle and driveline component assembly
- Products: Holden; Engines; Transmissions; Differentials
- Employees: 350 (2014)
- Architect: Eric Gibson
- Style: Art Deco
- Area: 50 acres (20 ha)
- Address: 171-197 Salmon Street, Fishermans Bend, Victoria
- Defunct: 2020

The Holden Fishermans Bend Plant was an industrial park opened in 1936 in Fishermans Bend, Victoria, as Holden's headquarters. The new location was opened due to many issues with its previous City Road facility. The park was also intended to kickstart a Victorian leg of the General Motors subsidiaries Chevrolet and Vauxhall.

In 1948, the plant facilitated the production of the first Holden-branded motor vehicle, the Holden 48-215. In 1956, due to an inability to meet demand, the assembly section of the plant was closed, succeeded by the new Dandenong plant. The Fishermans Bend plant also produced engines and driveline components for all domestic and most exported vehicles up until 2016, when the Australian LFX V6 was discontinued. In 1981, production started of the global Family II engine series - most of which were produced for export to other GM plants around the world.

Since 2020, the area is no longer used by Holden for manufacturing or administration. In 2021, it was announced that the University of Melbourne planned to redevelop the area as the headquarters of its school of engineering, with plans to open in 2024.

== Products ==
After production of the Commodore VL engines ceased, the engine division became known as 'Holden Engine Company' (Aka. HEC)

Pre-Holden

- Misc. Chevrolets
- Misc. Vauxhalls

Vehicles

- Holden 48-215
- Holden 50-2106
- Holden FJ

Engines

- Holden straight-six motor
- Holden V8 engine
- GM 3800 V6 engine
- GM High Feature V6 engine
- GM Family II engine

Transmissions

- Holden Manual transmission

Differentials

- Holden Banjo differential
- Holden Salisbury differential

== Notes ==
1. The facility was alternatively named the General Motors Holden Port Melbourne plant
