= Spotswood sewer tunnel =

The Spotswood sewer tunnel is a sanitary sewer tunnel in Melbourne, Victoria, Australia. It was constructed in 1895 to take sewerage under the Yarra River to the Spotswood Pumping Station, where it was pumped to the Werribee Sewage Farm.

The Melbourne & Metropolitan Board of Works (MMBW) was created in 1892 and appointed eminent British engineer James Mansergh to advise on a suitable system. However, local engineer William Thwaites was responsible for the design and construction. The system included sewer mains from the Melbourne CBD and south-eastern suburbs, extending across Fishermans Bend to a point opposite the pumping station. A tunnelling apparatus was imported from Britain, designed by British engineer James Henry Greathead. It consisted of a cylindrical shield, 3.4 metres (11 ft) in diameter, made of cast iron and steel plate, which was driven into the soft alluvial clays by hydraulic rams. Air pressure inside the shield was maintained at two or three times atmospheric pressure to inhibit groundwater inflow, with an airlock to allow tunnellers to enter and exit. Cast-iron ring segments were bolted behind the shield as it advanced, and then the tunnel was lined with 30 centimetres (12 in) of concrete.

On the night of 12 April 1895, the shield failed, and the river flooded into the tunnel, drowning a young engineer and five workers. Three other men were waiting to enter through the air lock, and saw the incident through a small thick glass window, but were unable to do anything. Thousands of tons of clay were dumped in the riverbed to seal the hole and the tunnel pumped out. The bodies were recovered and work resumed under a new contractor, and the tunnel was completed 12 months later.

A memorial for the six who died is located at the West Gate Bridge Memorial Park off Hyde Street.

== External images ==
- Segments of tunnel at Spotswood Pumping Station (Engineers Australia) on Flickr
