= Holden SS =

Holden SS series
- Product type: Performance engines and cars; Automotive sports accessories
- Produced by: Holden
- Country: Australia
- Introduced: 1972

The SS was an option package for a range of Holden vehicles, featuring V8 engines, unique interiors, body kits, louder and higher flowing exhaust systems, that generally express a more aggressive and performance-centered feel over non-SS models. The SS badge is an acronym for "Super Sport", and was initially used in 1961 by General Motors, Holden's parent company.

The VE and VF Commodore SS V models are somewhat closely related in design philosophy to the Cadillac V series, As shown by the badge.

== HQ SS ==
Holden SS
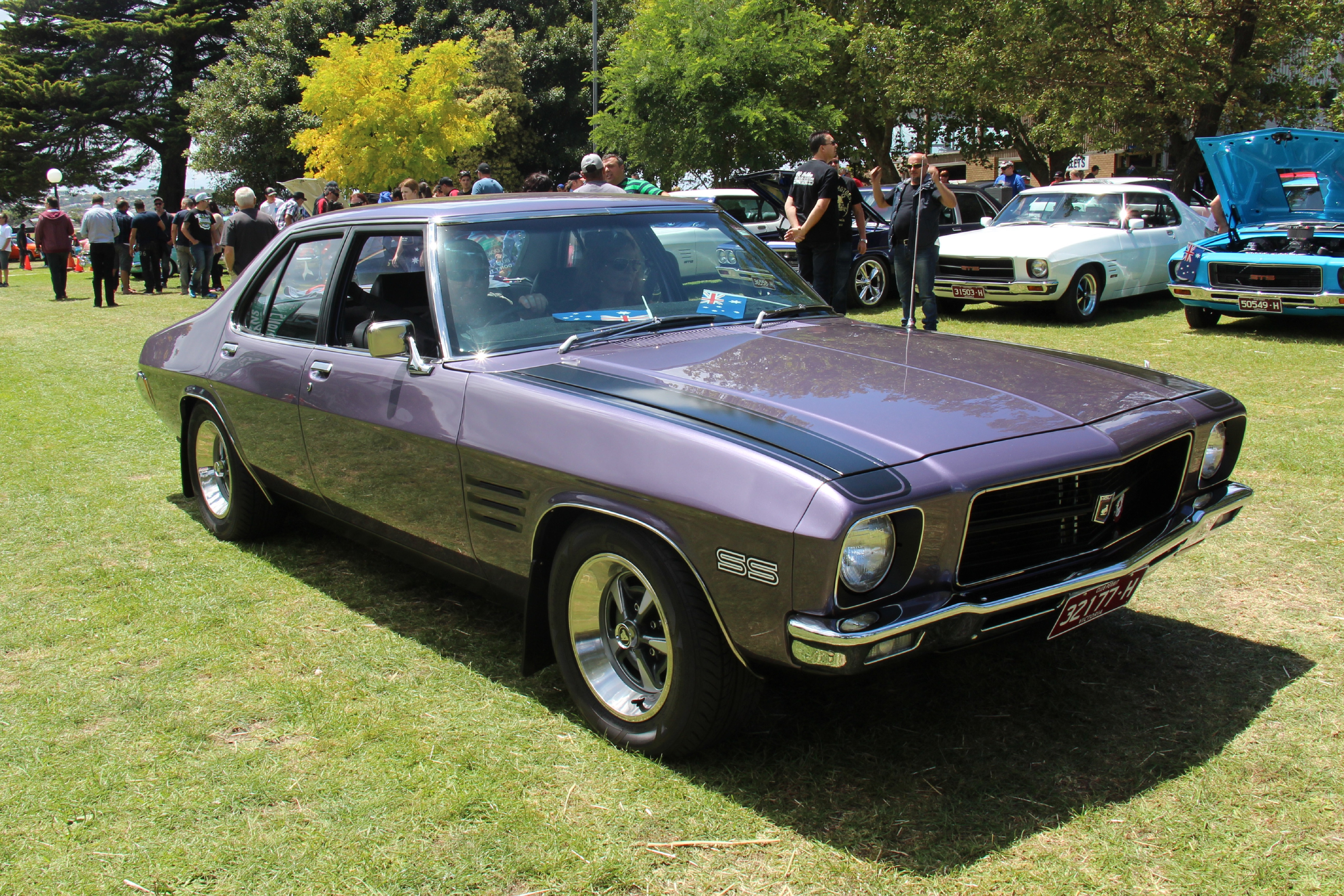
- 1972 Holden HQ SS sedan

Overview
- Manufacturer: Holden
- Production: 1972
- Assembly: Acacia Ridge; Dandenong; Elizabeth; Pagewood

Body and chassis
- Class: Full-size
- Body style: 4-door sedan
- Platform: Holden HQ platform

Powertrain
- Engine: 4.2L Holden 253 V8; 5.0L GMH '308' V8
- Transmission: 4 Speed Manual

Chronology
- Successor: Holden HQ GTS sedan

Unveiled in August 1972 at the Sydney Motor Show as a Limited-Run Option package for the Holden Belmont V8 sedan, enhanced into a budget sports car to compete with Ford Australia's Falcon GT, with a 5.0L Holden V8 optional, Paired with a standard 4-Speed Manual, Backed by a 10-Bolt Salisbury differential with a 3.36:1 ratio (Unusually, painted white, along with the driveshaft).

The interior featured a Sports dash, including a tachometer and dual split gauges for fuel, oil pressure, temperature and voltage, other features include a sporty steering wheel, center console and bucket seats trimmed in black vinyl with houndstooth inserts

The exterior featured a stripe and decal kit supplied by 3M Australia, other exterior features include General Motors of Canada imported Pontiac rally wheels. The SS was available in 3 colours: Lettuce Alone (light green), Infra Red (reddish orange) and Ultraviolet (Purplish Gunmetal Grey Metallic).

== LX Torana SS Hatch ==
Holden Torana LX SS Hatch
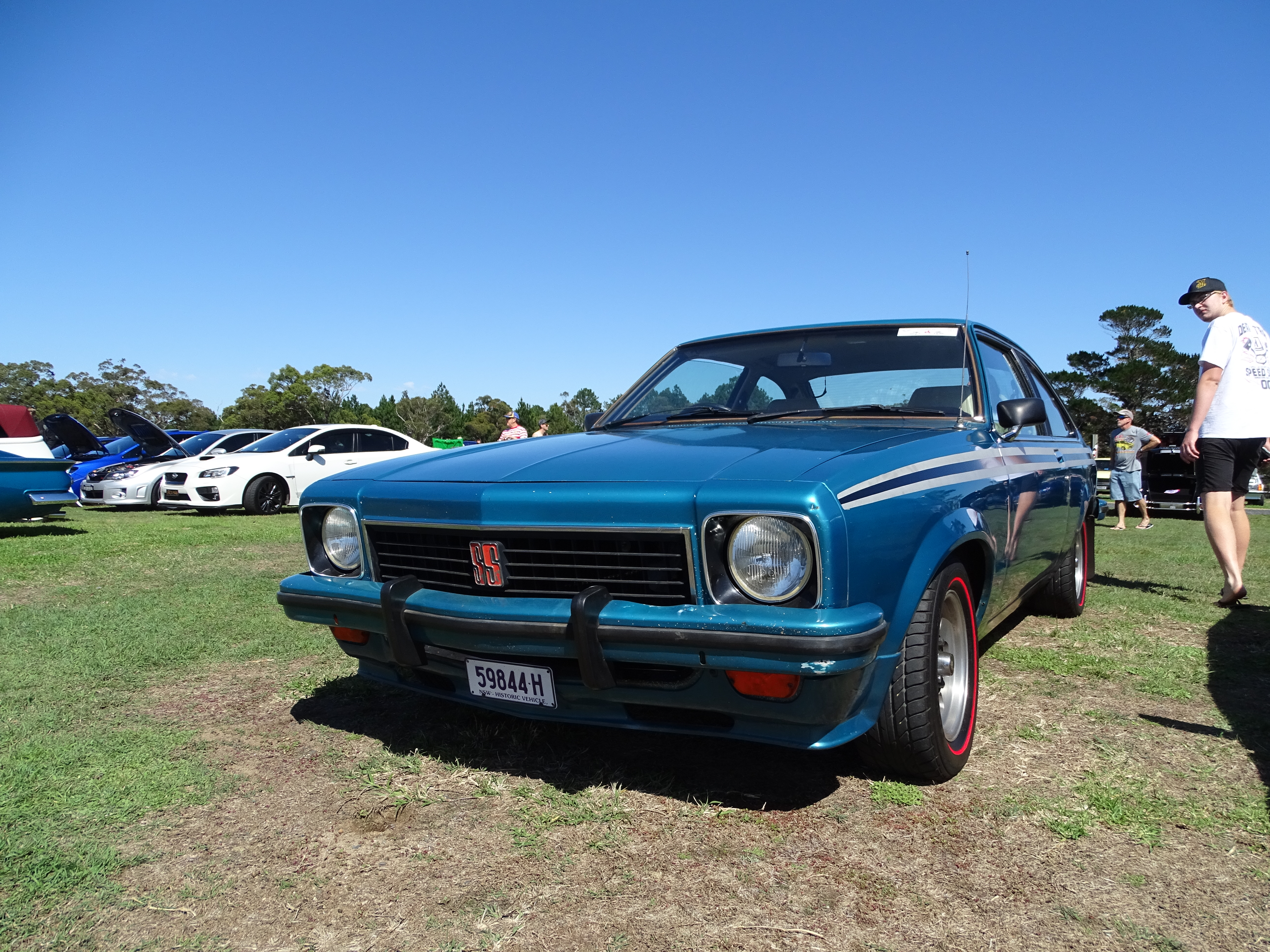
- 1977 Holden Torana SS Hatchback

Overview
- Manufacturer: Holden
- Production: 1976-1978
- Assembly: Dandenong

Body and chassis
- Class: Mid-size
- Body style: 3-door Hatchback

Powertrain
- Engine: '202' GMH I6; '253' GMH OHV V8; '308' GMH OHV V8
- Transmission: 4 Speed Manual; 3 Speed Holden Tri-Matic Automatic; Misc. Ford-sourced auto.

Chronology
- Predecessor: Holden HQ SS
- Successor: HDT VH Commodore SS

The LX Torana SS Hatchback was a performance centered version of the LX Hatch, Powered by either a 202 cubic-inch Holden Straight-Six, or two sizes of Holden V8, in 253 (4.2) or 308 (5.0L) capacities, bolted to either a Four-Speed Borg-Warner Manual, or a Three-Speed Holden Tri-Matic Automatic, Backed by a 10-Bolt Salisbury Differential with Heavy-Duty Axles, Most remaining SS Toranas have ended up in the hands of Street-Machiners and tastefully modified.

An A9X recently sold at auction for $500,000. In mid 2021 one was expected to fetch over $1,000,000 at auction

== Commodore SS models ==
Holden Commodore SS
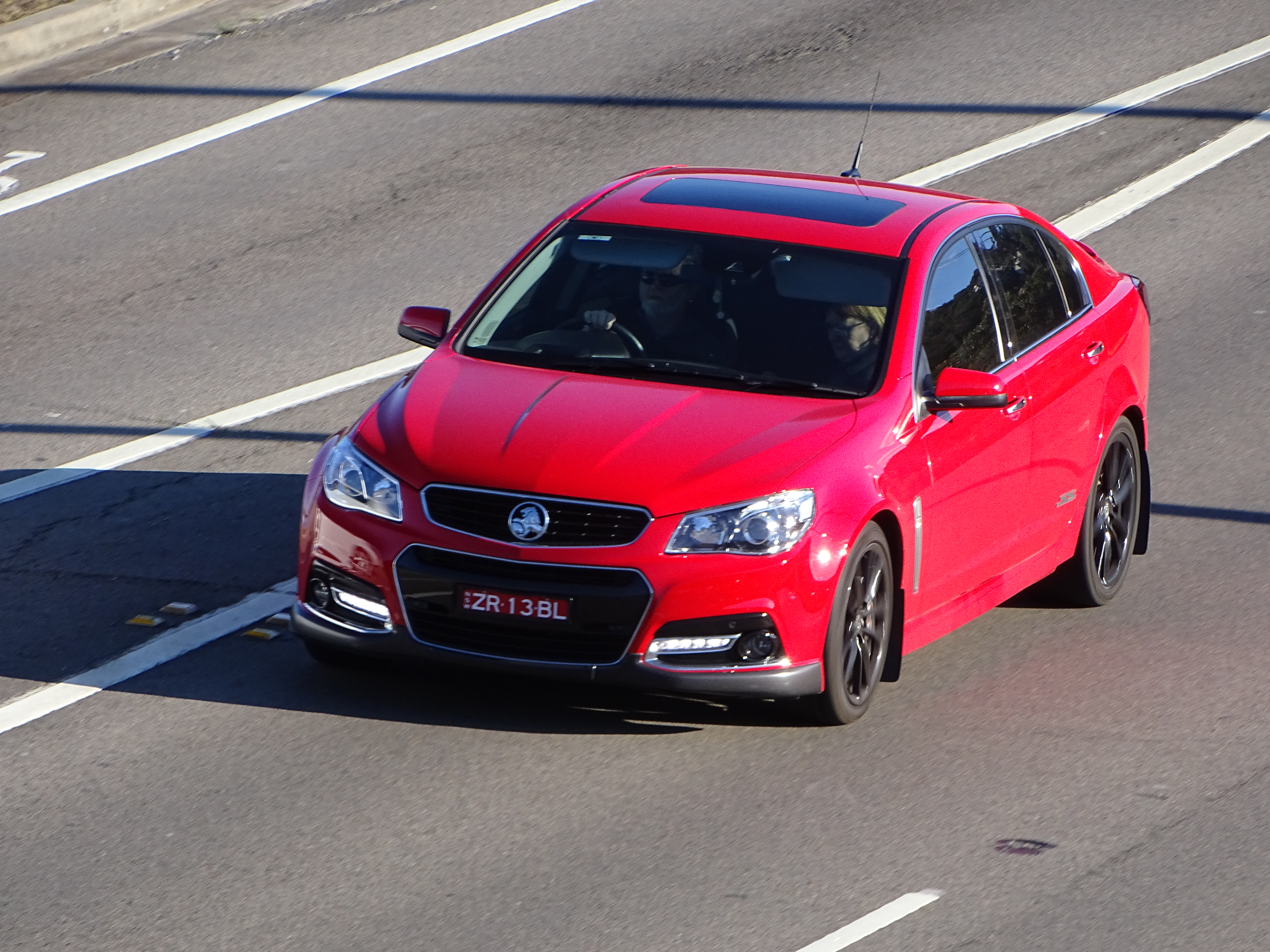
- 2015 Holden Commodore VF SS

Overview
- Manufacturer: Holden
- Production: 1982-2017
- Assembly: Dandenong (1982-1989); Elizabeth (1982-2017): HDT Commodore SS Group A-C (1982-1986); HSV VL SS Group A SV (1988); Chevrolet SS (2014-2017)

Body and chassis
- Class: Full-size
- Body style: 4-door sedan; 5-Door Station Wagon (2003-); 2-Door Ute (2000-)
- Platform: GM V platform (1978-2006); GM Zeta Platform (2006-2017)

Powertrain
- Engine: '253' GMH OHC V8; '308' GMH OHC V8; 5.0L Holden 5000i V8; 5.7L GM LS1 V8; 6.0L GM L98 V8; 6.0L GM L77 V8; 6.2L GM LS3 V8
- Transmission: A selection of GM: 4 Speed Manuals; 5 Speed Manuals; 6 Speed Manuals; 4 Speed Automatics; 5 Speed Automatics; 6 Speed Automatics

Chronology
- Predecessor: Holden Torana LX SS Hatchback HSV VL SS Group A SV
- Successor: Holden Commodore ZB VXR

Since the 1980s, right up until Holden's Australian production ceased in late 2017, the 'SS' name had been used on V8-powered (with the exception of one Supercharged Ecotec V6), bodykit-fitted Commodores, renowned Australia-wide for its ability to comfortably transport a family of up to 5 from one end of the country to the other whenever its driver saw fit. SS-Spec Commodores normally featured identifiable 'SS' badging on the bootlid (and rear doors in VY onwards models (forward of rear wheel arches on Utes)). The SS range sat above the V6-powered S and later SV6 models.

=== Commodore SS V ===
The Commodore SS V was a more refined version of the Commodore SS produced between 2006 and 2017 across VE and VF generations. Featuring more track ready, sporty or luxury features, bridging the gap between the SS and Calais V, such as Leather seats, electronically adjustable seats, thicker steering wheel, alloy rims and more. The SS V, along with its badge, are inspired by Cadillac's V series vehicles.

== Engines ==
Engine	Description	Uses
Pre-ADR27A GMH Red '253' V8	4.2L Carburetted V8	HQ SS
Pre-ADR27A GMH Red '308' V8	5.0L Carburetted V8	HQ SS
ADR27A GMH Red '202' I6	3.3L Carburetted I6	LX Torana SS
ADR27A GMH Red '253' V8	4.2L Carburetted V8	LX Torana SS
ADR27A GMH Red '308' V8	5.0L Carburetted V8	LX Torana SS
Holden 5000i V8	5.0L Injected V8	VN Commodore SS, VP Commodore SS, VR Commodore SS, VS Commodore SS, VT Commodore SS
GM LS1 V8	5.7L Injected V8	VT Commodore SS, VX Commodore SS, VY Commodore SS
GM L76/L98/L97/L77 V8	6.0L Injected V8	VZ Commodore SS, VE Commodore SS, VF Commodore SS
GM LS3 V8	6.2L Injected V8	VF Commodore SS

== See also ==
- Holden HQ
- Holden Belmont
- Holden Commodore
- Holden Torana

== Notes ==
1. With the exceltion of the 202-powered Torana SS, and the L67 Supercharged V6 available in third generation Commodores.
2. The Commodore VF II featured a Bi-Modal exhaust.
3. In high-intensity racing scenarios, HDT would occasionally use Ford C-series gearboxes.
4. In the VT Series II onwards. Previously a 5L Holden V8 was used in the VN through VT Series I models.
