= Holden Commodore (VH) =

Australian mid-size car

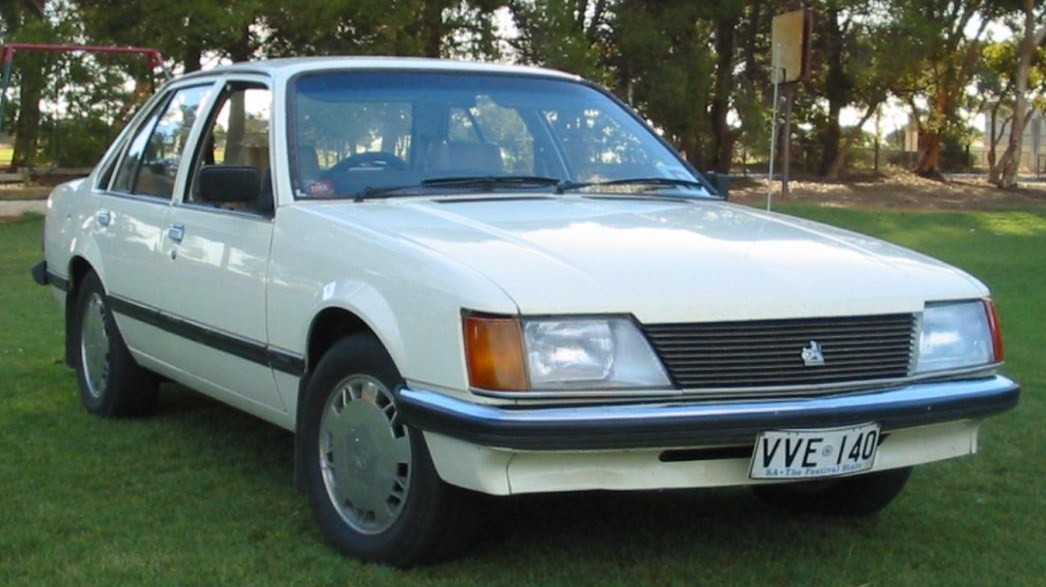
- 1982 Holden Commodore (VH) SL sedan

Overview
- Manufacturer: Holden (General Motors)
- Production: October 1981 – February 1984
- Assembly: Australia: Adelaide, South Australia (Elizabeth), Melbourne, Victoria (Dandenong); New Zealand: Wellington (Trentham)
- Designer: Leo Pruneau

Body and chassis
- Class: Mid-size
- Body style: 4-door sedan 5-door station wagon
- Layout: Front engine, rear-wheel drive
- Platform: GM V platform
- Related: Opel Rekord E Opel Senator; Vauxhall Carlton

Powertrain
- Engine: 1.9 L Starfire I4; 2.85 L Blue I6; 3.3 L Blue I6; 4.2 L Blue V8; 5.0 L Blue V8
- Transmission: 4-speed manual 5-speed manual 3-speed automatic

Dimensions
- Wheelbase: 2,668 mm (105.0 in)
- Length: 4,706 mm (185.3 in); 4,730 mm (186.2 in) (Wagon)
- Width: 1,722 mm (67.8 in)
- Height: 1,363 mm (53.7 in)
- Kerb weight: 1,152 kg (2,540 lb) – 1,326 kg (2,923 lb)

Chronology
- Predecessor: Holden Commodore (VC)
- Successor: Holden Commodore (VK)

The Holden Commodore (VH) is a mid-size car that was produced by Holden from 1981 to 1984. It was the third iteration of the first generation of the Holden Commodore.

== History ==
The VH Commodore was released on 5 October 1981. The frontal appearance was a mild facelift to the VC Commodore, with a new horizontal-slat grille and new lighting components designed to give a lower, wider look, and for interest of aerodynamics. It continued to be available as sedan and station wagon, with new taillight clusters utilized on sedan models.

With the effects of the 1979 energy crisis ending, buyers gravitated towards the larger Ford Falcon rival, rather than the mid-size Commodore. Thus for the first time since its introduction, the Holden Commodore lost its position as Australia's best-selling car.

Production of this model ceased in February 1984, to be replaced by the much further facelifted Holden Commodore (VK).

== Powertrains ==
The engines were carried over but revisions were made to the 1.9- and 2.85-litre engines to improve fuel economy. Gains of 12.5 and 14 percent respectively were made to the city cycle fuel economy figures.

Mechanical specifications were as before, except for an additional five-speed manual transmission which was an option only (due to the limits of the transmission-box) on the 1.9-litre four-cylinder and 2.85-litre straight six versions. A 4142 cc V8 engine (marketed as the 4.2 litre V8) was also available from the beginning. This was later complemented by the more powerful 5.0 litre V8.

In New South Wales, due to more stringent emissions laws the 3.3-litre V8 and 5.0-litre V8 were not able to be optioned with a manual transmission.

Powertrains
| Eng. disp.; configuration | Engine | Power | Torque | Transmission |
|---|---|---|---|---|
| 1.9 L; I4 | Starfire | 54 kW (72 hp) | 138 N⋅m (102 lb⋅ft) | 4-speed manual 5-speed manual 3-speed automatic |
| 2.85 L; I6 | Holden straight-six motor (Blue) | 73 kW (98 hp) | 187 N⋅m (138 lb⋅ft) | 4-speed manual 5-speed manual 3-speed automatic |
| 3.3 L; I6 | Holden straight-six motor (Blue) | 83 kW (111 hp) | 231 N⋅m (170 lb⋅ft) | 4-speed manual 3-speed automatic |
| 4.2 L; V8 | Holden V8 engine (Blue) | 100 kW (134 hp) | 269 N⋅m (198 lb⋅ft) | 4-speed manual 3-speed automatic |
| 4.2 L; V8 (dual exhaust) | Holden V8 engine (Blue) | 115 kW (154 hp) | 289 N⋅m (213 lb⋅ft) | 4-speed manual 3-speed automatic |
| 5.0 L; V8 | Holden V8 engine (Blue) | 117 kW (157 hp) | 336 N⋅m (248 lb⋅ft) | 4-speed manual 3-speed automatic |
| 5.0 L; V8 (dual exhaust) | Holden V8 engine (Blue) | 126 kW (169 hp) | 361 N⋅m (266 lb⋅ft) | 4-speed manual 3-speed automatic |

== Models ==
At the same time a reshuffle was made to the range—SL was now the base model and SL/X was introduced as the mid-range car, with SL/E remaining the top-of-the-line sedan. Wagons were available in SL and SL/X variants.

In 1983 an 'Executive' pack of the base Commodore was introduced, primarily directed to fleet buyers. These cars featured automatic transmission and air-conditioning as part of a Commodore SL package, but had no distinguishable external identification badges. Special editions of Commodore released around Christmas 1981, 1982 and 1983 were badged 'Vacationer'.

=== Commodore SL ===
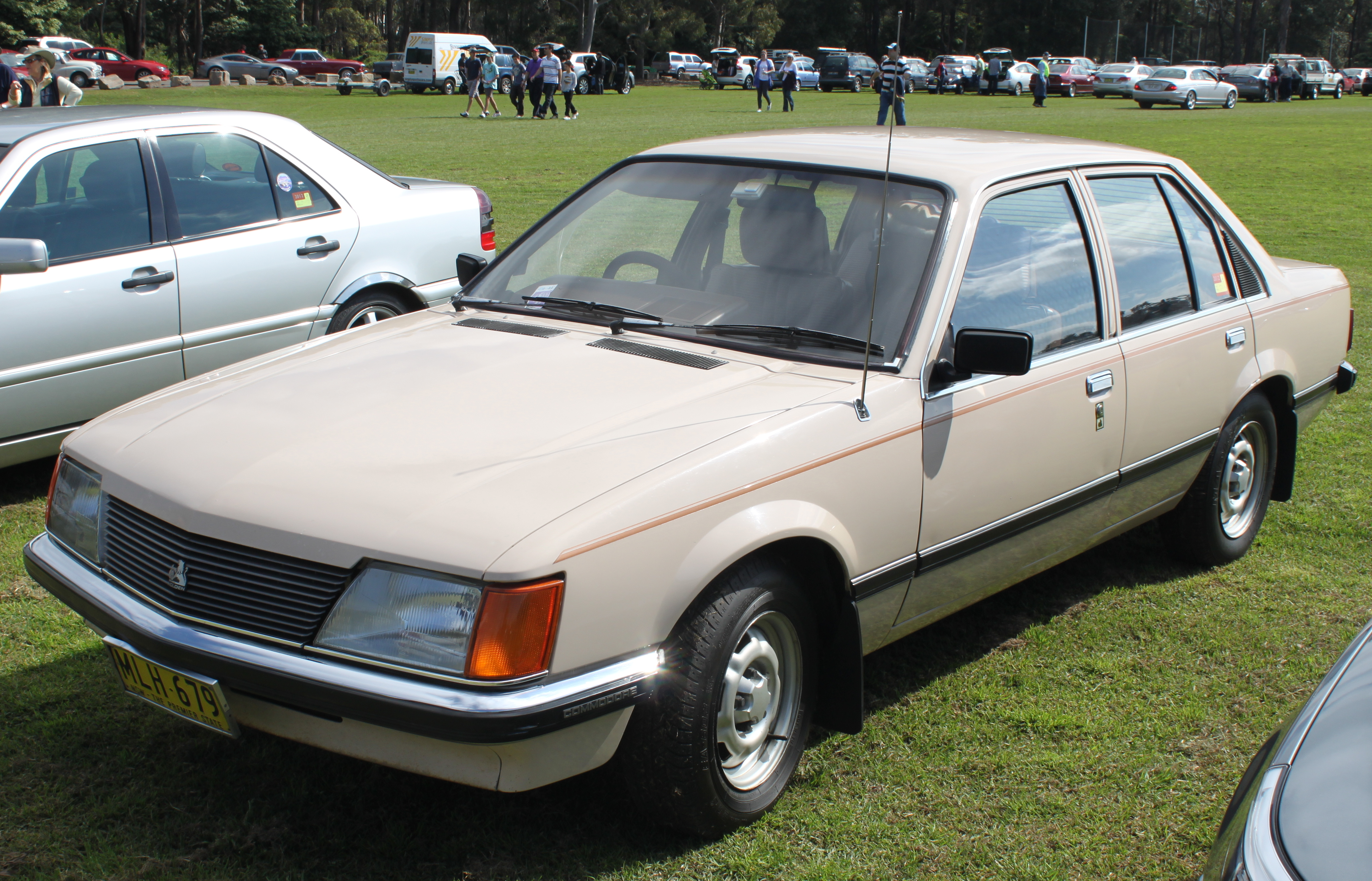
Commodore SL sedan

The SL was the entry-level model, replacing the L. It came standard with the 2.8-litre I6 with a manual transmission, . It had the option for the 1.9-litre Starfire straight-four.

=== Commodore SL/X ===
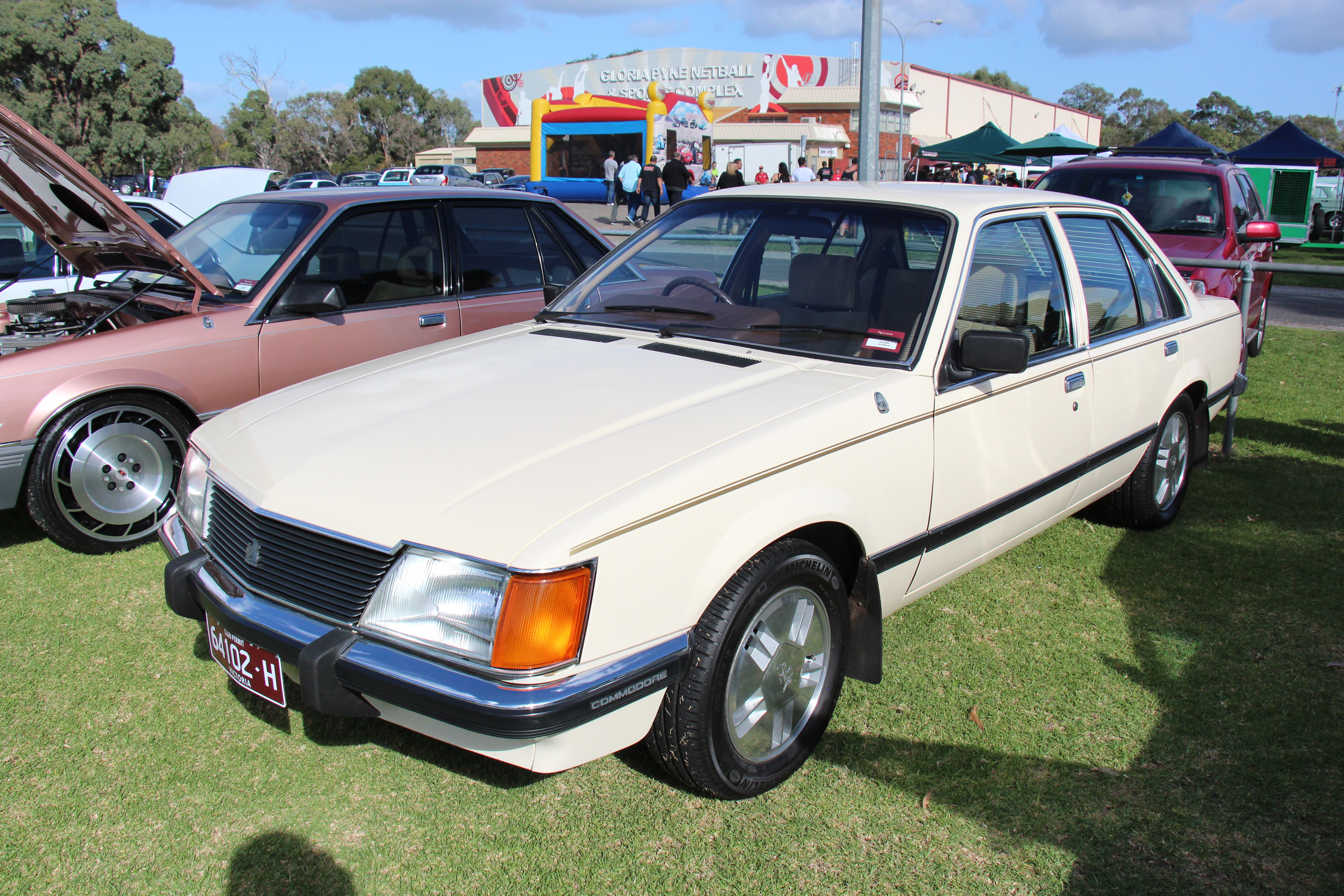
Commodore SL/X sedan

The SL/X was the mid-level model. It came standard with the 2.8 L I6 with an automatic transmission. It had the option for the 1.9 L Starfire.

=== Commodore SL/E ===
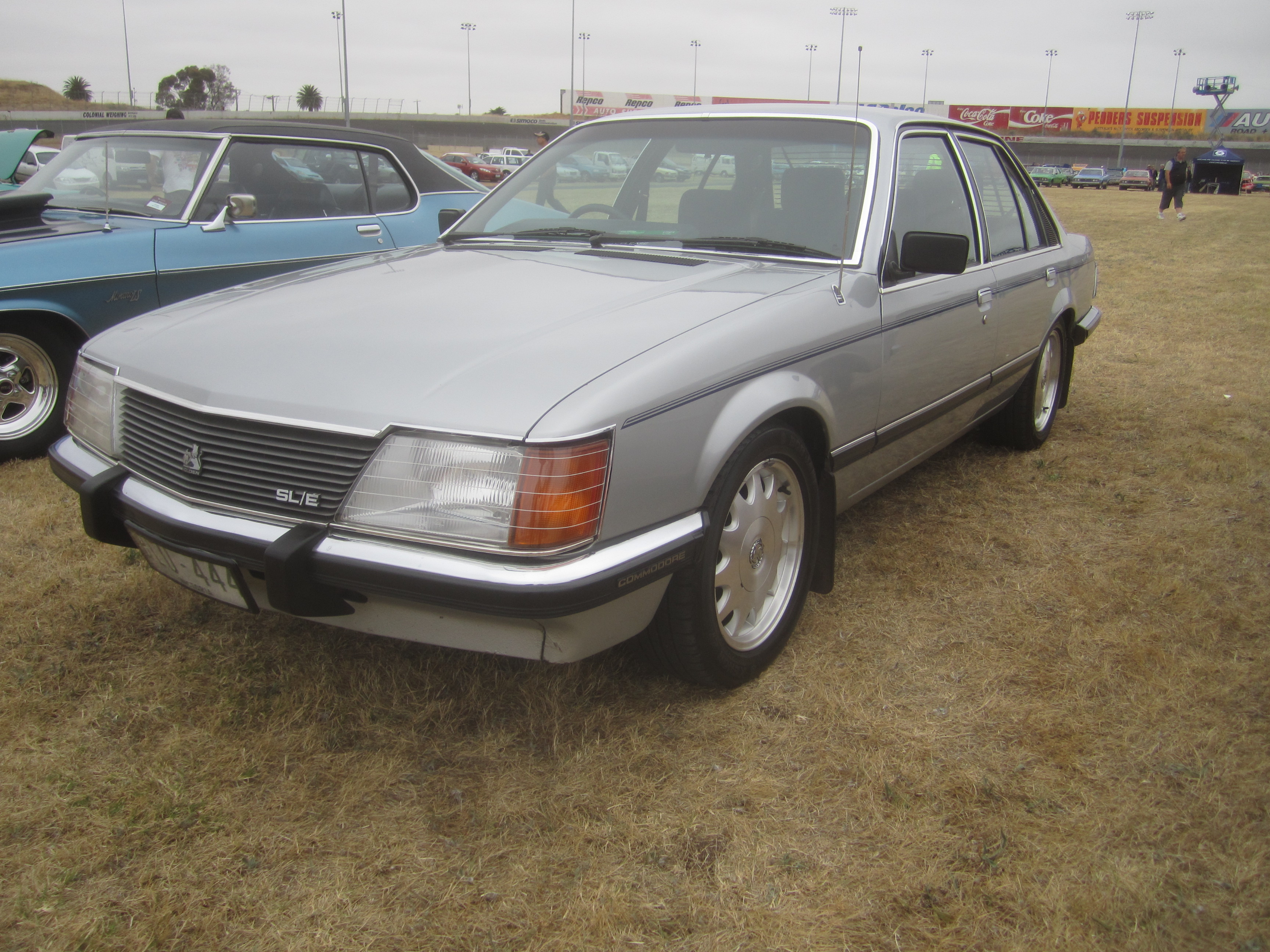
Commodore SL/E sedan

The SL/E was the top-of-the-line luxury model. The SL/E was only available as a sedan, and could not be optioned with the Starfire engine, it came standard wit the 3.3-litre I6 with an automatic transmission. The SL/E also came available with optional cruise control and a trip computer, which measured average speed and fuel consumption.

=== Commodore SS ===
The SS was the sports model, introduced in September 1982, The VH was the first Commodore to use the SS nameplate - for "Super Sport" - which remained a mainstay until 2017. It featured the 4.2 L V8 as standard, with an optional 5.0 L V8. It was supplemented by three up-spec versions produced by Peter Brock's HDT Special Vehicles company.

== HDT range ==
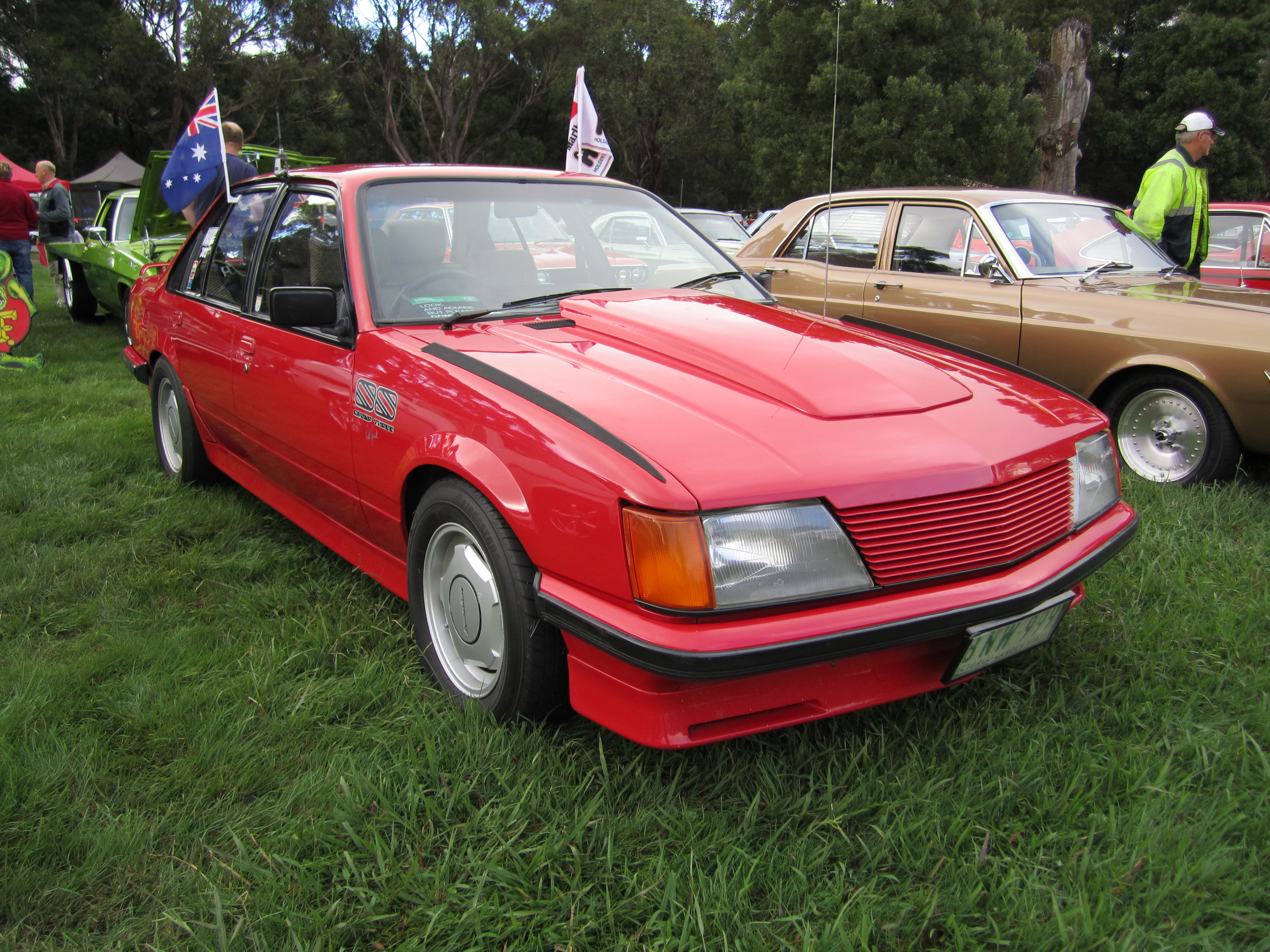
HDT VH Commodore SS Group Three

The HDT models were named "SS Group One", "SS Group Two" and "SS Group Three", with the lattermost also featuring the Holden 5.0-litre V8 in a higher state of tune). The SS sedans were initially exclusively Maranello Red in colour, but were later also made available in Alabaster White. The Group Three-tuned V8 produced 184 kW (247 hp).

== Exports ==
In Indonesia the only engine available was the 1.9-liter four, in SL/X trim and with a five-speed manual. Because of the absence of emissions controls in that market, power was higher than for Australian cars, at 59 kW (79 hp). After having been absent from the Malaysian market for nearly a decade, Almas Motors Corporation (AMC) brought the Holden brand back in 1983 with the VH Commodore. While Japanese cars had supplanted European imports in most of the market, there was still room for non-Japanese brands in the larger segments of the market.

In New Zealand, the VH Commodore was locally assembled beginning in early 1982 at Trentham with the Starfire four and with the 3.3-litre six, sedans as well as station wagons. SL and SL/X trims were available. The higher equipped SL/E and V8-engined models were also available, imported fully built-up from Australia. Later on, the new Royale specification was added, exclusive to the local market. This was based on the well equipped SL/E trim, but fitted with the smallest engine, the 1.9-litre Starfire. This was a strong seller and the Royale was carried over into the subsequent VK, VKA (1986 NZ market VK), and the VL series.

== Motorsport ==
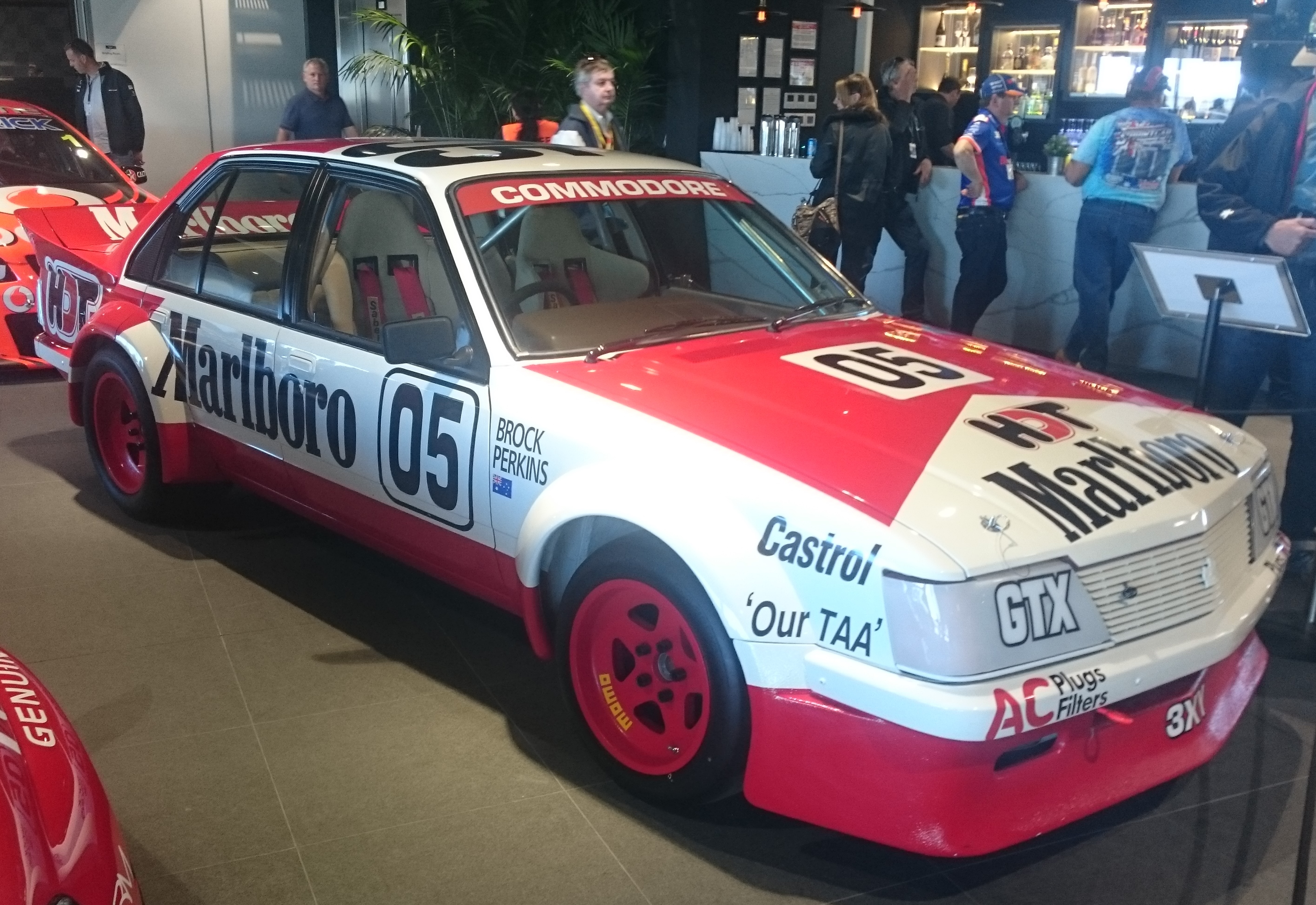
Peter Brock and Larry Perkins drove this Group C Commodore VH in the 1983 James Hardie 1000 but did not finish the race. The car is pictured in 2018.

The VH Commodore was first used in Australian Touring car racing in the 1982 Australian Touring Car Championship. Controversy reigned as the Holden Dealer Team attempted to run Peter Brock's car with yet-to-be homologated parts. Brock actually scored enough points to win the 1982 ATCC (using both the VC and VH), but was disqualified from all but two races of the series.

Better was to come in the late season endurance races. With the HDT VH Commodore SS now properly homologated, Allan Grice drove his Commodore to pole position in the 1982 James Hardie 1000 at Mount Panorama with a time of 2:17.501 after earlier having been the first driver to lap the 6.172 km (3.835 mi) circuit in a touring car at better than 100 mph (161 km/h) with a lap of 2:17.8 in official qualifying. The Holden VH Commodore SS went on to fill the top four places in the race with the HDT Commodore of Peter Brock and Larry Perkins winning the race.

The Commodore was still a major force in the 1983 Australian Touring Car Championship with both Grice and Brock each winning two of the eight round series. However, they were forced to give best to Allan Moffat and his smaller, lighter (and thus much better suited to the tight Australian tracks) Mazda RX-7. Moffat won four of the eight rounds, and with the emergence of the smaller capacity Nissan Bluebird turbo of George Fury, Brock and Grice finished only 3rd and 4th at the end of the championship.

Further homologations grants from the Confederation of Australian Motorsport (CAMS) in August 1983 saw the VH Commodore SS once again the car to beat. Peter Brock set pole position at the 1983 James Hardie 1000 (VH Commodores filled seven of the top 10 spots on the grid), and although his own car suffered a rare engine failure on lap 8 of the race, he and Perkins then moved into the team's second car with its lead driver John Harvey to go on and win the race. The second HDT car was in fact the 1982 winning car giving the Commodore the distinction of being the only car to twice win the Bathurst 1000. The VH Commodore would fill six of the top 10 finishing positions in the race.

The VH continued to be a major force into 1984, with Brock winning the opening two rounds of the 1984 ATCC before finishing second to Moffat's Mazda in Round 3. However, Brock was to miss two rounds of the series while racing a Porsche 956 at the 1000 km of Silverstone and Le Mans 24 Hours. Brock would eventually finish second in the championship behind the Ford XE Falcon of Dick Johnson. The VH Commodore SS has the distinction of winning the final ATCC race held under the locally developed Group C regulations when Allan Grice won the 7th and final round of the championship at the Adelaide International Raceway on 1 July.

The VH Commodore SS was succeeded by the Holden VK Commodore in the last half of 1984, though it was only the HDT, Roadways and Warren Cullen's team who would race the new model. The VH remained the Commodore of choice for the privateers. The model's touring car racing life ended at the completion of the 1984 season as CAMS had decided that new rules based on the FIA's international Group A regulations would apply to Australian Touring Cars from the beginning of 1985.

The VH Commodore also proved to be popular in Sports Sedan racing as well as in speedway.
