= Fishermen's Bend Aerodrome =

Former airfield in Victoria, Australia

Fishermen’s Bend Aerodrome
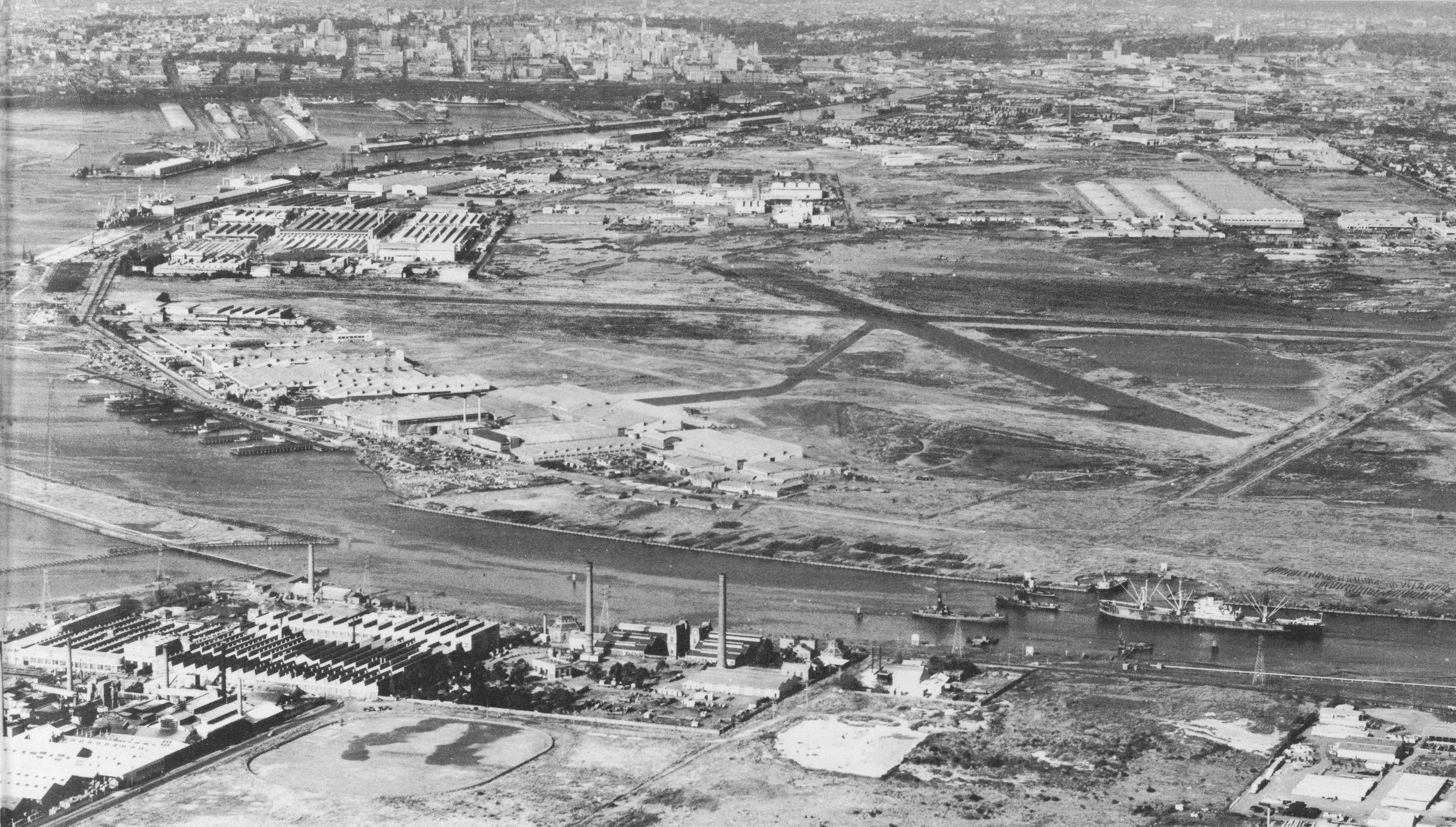
- Aerial view of the Fishermans Bend aerodrome c. 1954
- IATA: none; ICAO: none

Summary
- Airport type: Defunct
- Location: Fishermans Bend, Melbourne, Victoria
- Opened: 1921
- Closed: 1967
- Coordinates: 37°49′52″S 144°54′40″E
- Interactive map of Fishermen’s Bend Aerodrome

Fishermen's Bend Aerodrome was located at Fishermen's Bend, Melbourne, Victoria, Australia. It was established in 1936 and was prominently occupied by the Commonwealth Aircraft Corporation (CAC) and the Department of Aircraft Production (DAP) later renamed as the Government Aircraft Factories (GAF), manufacturing aircraft during World War II and post war. All aerodrome operations ceased in 1967 due to the planned construction of the near by West Gate Bridge and replaced by Avalon Airport which opened in 1953 and supported jet aircraft production in Australia.

== History ==
There have been a number of early airfields in the Port Melbourne area including: 1921 - 1930 - Graham Carey operated his 4 Maurice Farman Shorthorns from an airfield on the Port Melbourne Rifle Club grounds. 1926 - 1931 - Shawross Engineering and Aviation Company operated an airfield on the Port Phillip Bay foreshore of Port Melbourne. 1927-1935 - Larkin Aircraft Company (Lasco) operated an airfield on Coode Island across the Yarra River from Port Melbourne and Fisherman's Bend. corre

An aerodrome at Fisherman's Bend was first proposed by the Controller of Civil Aviation in response to an air disaster in 1921.

Beginning in 1936, the aerodrome initially served the local aircraft production of the privately owned Commonwealth Aircraft Corporation (CAC) and later the Australian Government's Department of Aircraft Production (DAP) renamed post war as the Government Aircraft Factories (GAF). It was a prominent facility during the Second World War but the value of locating such a facility so close to the city, industry and shipping was called into question soon after the end of the war. In 1947 W. McIlroy, Secretary for Lands, wrote to Premier Thomas Hollway indicating that, in his opinion, it was time to cease prevarication between the Commonwealth (which continued to push to extend what was now referred to as the 'Landing and Testing Field' at Fishermens Bend) and State authorities. McIlroy wrote:

The existing facilities would appear to be ample for testing all classes of machines in a lightly loaded condition while the use of this field for heavily loaded aircraft would be most undesirable and dangerous in view of the close proximity of the field to the big industrial undertakings adjoining, the shipping lanes which flank the field on the northern and western sides and the shipping docks which are to be erected at an early date on the southern side of Williamstown Road. Could not Laverton be used for this purpose where the runways are practically unlimited?

Essendon Airport now known as Essendon Fields Airport was created in 1921 as a civilian airfield some 12 km from Melbourne CBD.

The Laverton Air Base, RAAF Williams, had been operative since 1925. Avalon Airport was opened in 1953, to cater for the production of jet military aircraft.

In 1959, James Grant of Grant's Helicopters wrote to the Minister for Lands, K. H. Turnbull, applying to lease 'some available block of between ten and twenty acres on Fishermens Bend for the purposes of a helicopter port and training school.' Grant had learned that 'some 114 acres of Fishermen's Bend is now available for leasing, being no longer required by the Department of Supply of the Commonwealth Aircraft Corp.' It appears this request was not successful. At least one of the runways of the Fishermen's Bend Aerodrome were still in use in 1967, leased to the Department of Supply which 'conducted flying operations from it'. A charter operator, Jack Ellis of City Centre Air Taxis, was hopeful of running country air services to and from the facility. However, a portion of the airstrip was on land required for what was to become the Westgate Freeway, and Rupert Hamer, Minister for Local Government, resisted calls to keep the airstrip open. In a photograph of the partially-collapsed bridge published in Westgate Bridge, Melbourne, a promotional publication dating from approximately 1972, the remnants of the airstrip are still visible.

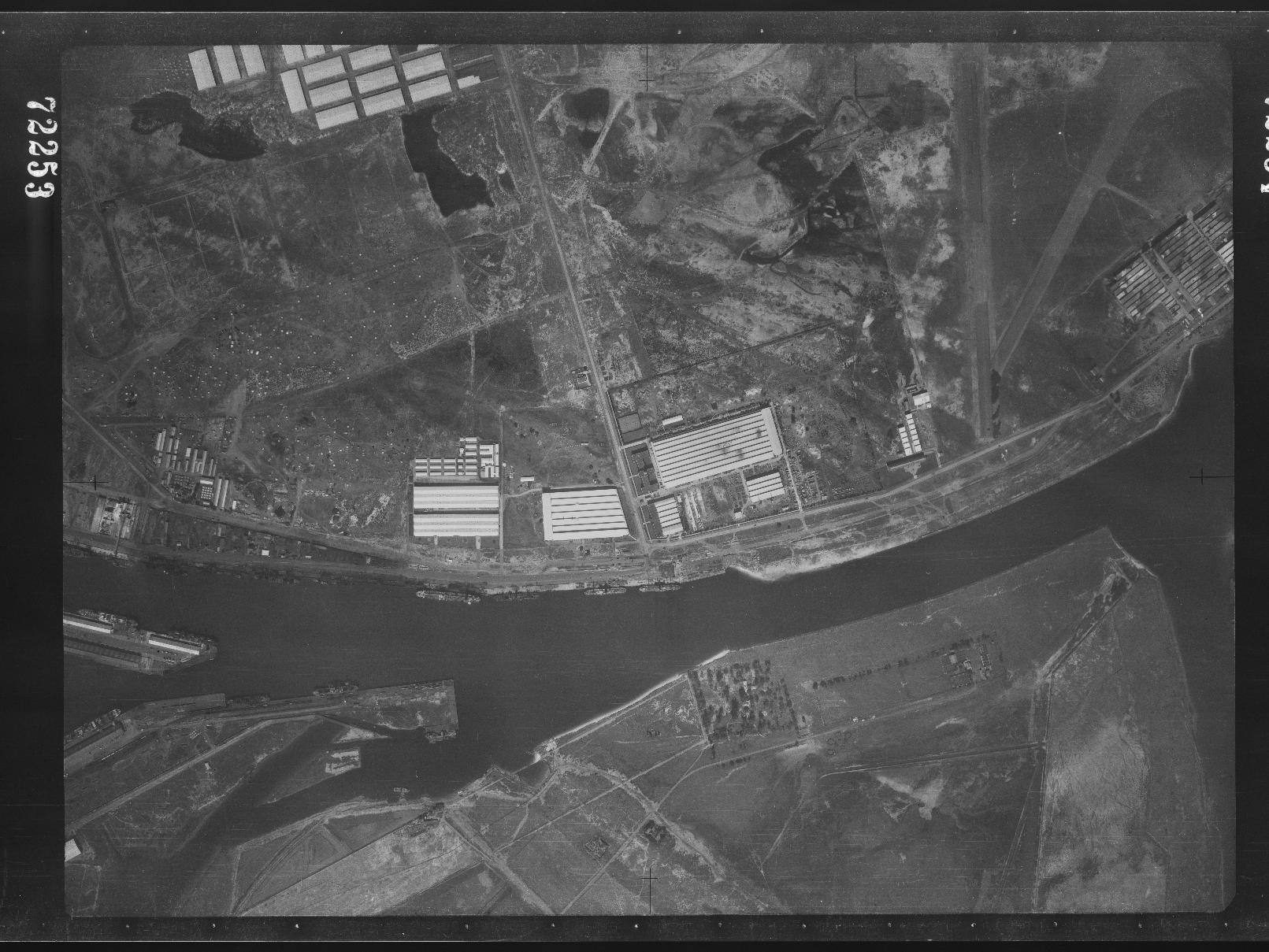
Fishermen Bend’s Aerodrome on 8 March, 1942.

== Motorsport ==
The airfield was used for motorcycle races in August 1948 then cars from 1949. It hosted events counting towards the Australian Drivers' Championship in both 1958 and 1959. and races were held at the circuit until at least 1960.

Subsequently the airstrip was used for organised drag racing until 1966 at which time AA class fuellers raced along with funny cars in times approaching 10 secs for the 1/4 mile track.

== The site today ==
Much of the land on which the Aerodrome was located is now the site of Westgate Park. Todd Road is essentially to the alignment of the north-south runway.
