= Fishermans Bend =

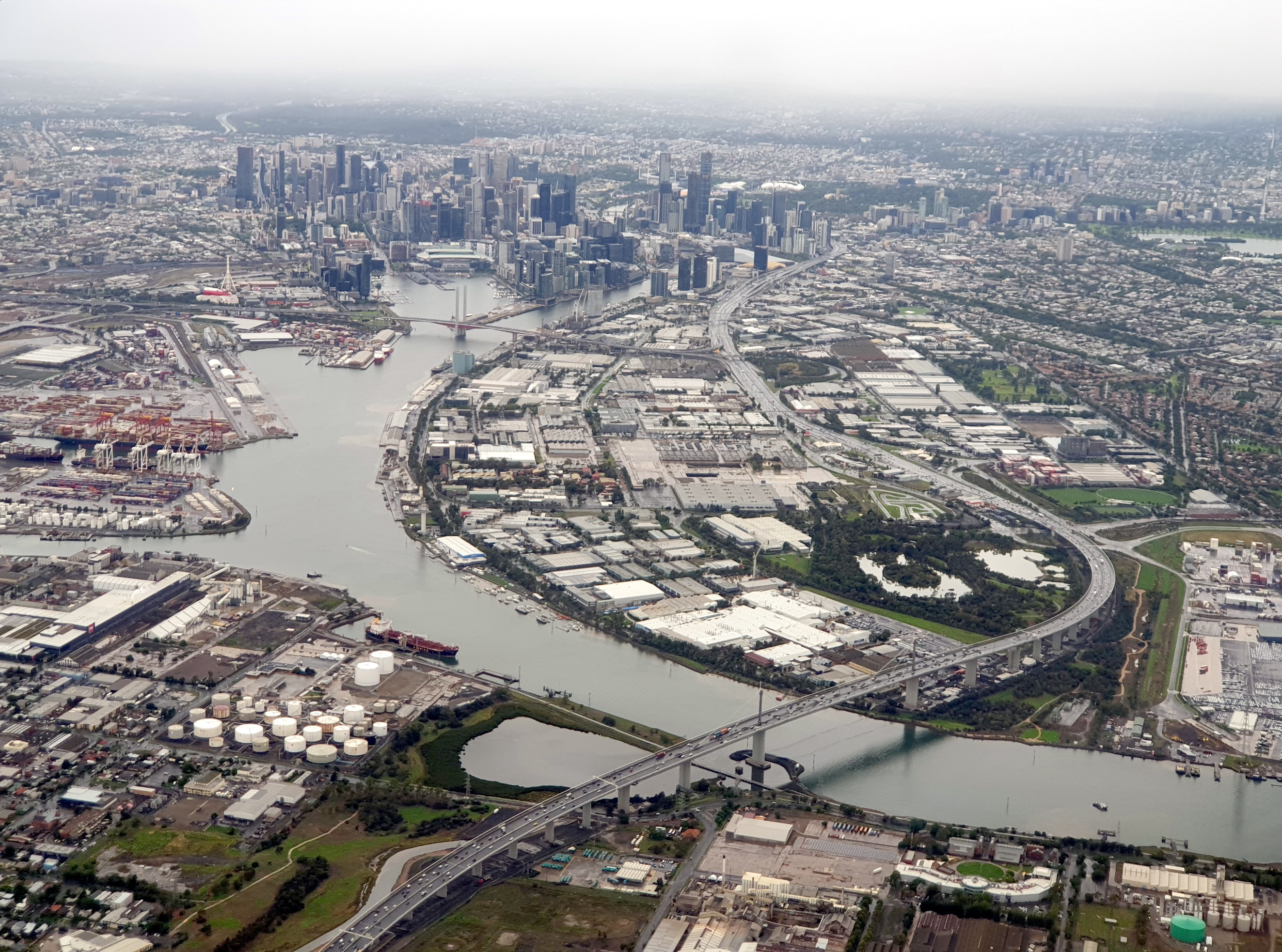
- Fishermans Bend from the air, 2020

- Coordinates: 37.826667°S 144.917221°E
- Country: Australia
- State: Victoria
- City: Melbourne
- LGA: Municipality of Port Phillip
- Location: 1 km (0.62 mi) south of Melbourne CBD
- Established: 1835

Government
  - State electorate: Albert Park
  - Federal division: Macnamara

Area
  - Total: 1.5 km^{2} (0.58 sq mi)
- Postcode: 3207
Localities around Fishermans Bend
Yarraville	West Melbourne	Melbourne
Yarraville	Fishermans Bend	South Melbourne
Williamstown	Port Melbourne	South Melbourne

Fishermans Bend (formerly Fishermen's Bend) is a precinct within the City of Port Phillip and the City of Melbourne. It is located on the south of the Yarra River in the suburb of Port Melbourne and opposite Coode Island, close to the Melbourne central business district. Fishermans Bend originally included the area now known as Garden City, which was renamed in 1929.

Since 2012 the area has been designated as a major urban renewal area, with plans for 80,000 residents by 2050. The future framework for Fishermans Bend includes one major employment precinct and four primarily residential suburbs.

== Early settlement ==
Fishermen began settling 'Humbug Reach' and 'Fishermen's Bend' along the lower Yarra River in the 1850s. Thirty families lived on the 'Bend', frequently finding additional work in the docks and cargo ships and loading ballast for ships returning to Europe. Habitation was in rough shacks along the Bend, made from corrugated iron, flattened kerosene tins or wood. There were no roads, shops, or sewerage. Water was collected from hanging out sail canvases, and stored in iron tanks or casks. Milk came from a nearby farm. Fishing continues on the bay. The last remaining shack on the Bend was demolished in 1970, as Webb Dock expanded; the Life Saving Victoria headquarters stand on the site today.

== Industry ==
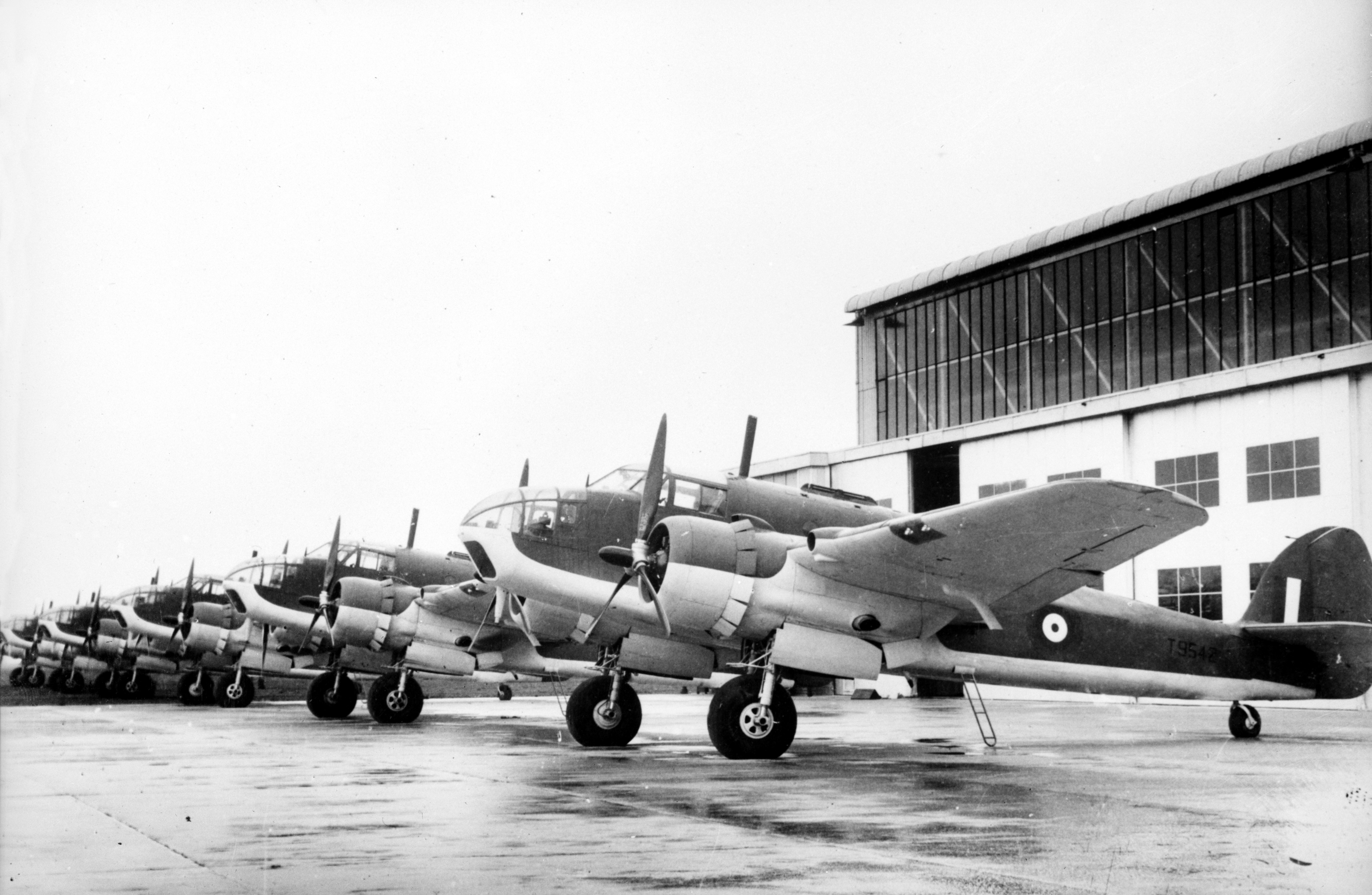
RAAF Bristol Beaufort Mk.V torpedo bombers at the Department of Aircraft Production (DAP) plant in Fisherman's Bend, circa 1941.

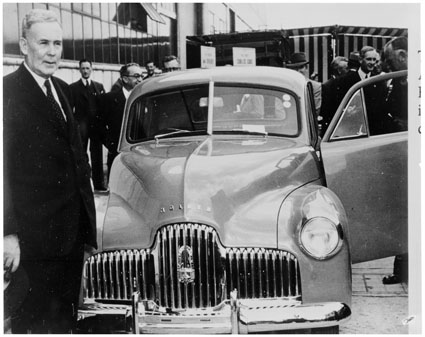
Prime Minister of Australia Ben Chifley at the launching of the first mass-produced Australian car at the General Motors-Holden factory, Fisherman's Bend.

The neighbourhood of Fishermans Bend also has a significant place in Australian aviation history, being the home of several prominent historical Australian aircraft design and manufacturing companies, including the Commonwealth Aircraft Corporation, Holden, Smorgon Steel, Government Aircraft Factories, the Aeronautical Research Laboratories and regional facilities for Boeing. Fishermen's Bend Aerodrome remained in use until 1957.

Previous industries included the car manufacturers Australian Motor Industries (later Toyota Australia) and the Rootes Group, GKN Aerospace Engineering Services and a campus of RMIT University dedicated to aerospace engineering.

Fishermans Bend is a primarily industrial centre at the foot of the West Gate Bridge and contains major establishments for the Defence Science and Technology Organisation, Holden, Hawker de Havilland, the Cooperative Research Centre for Advanced Composite Structures, Kraft Foods, Specsavers, Toyota Australia, and port security. It also has a marina, known as d'Albora Marinas Pier 35, and the Webb Dock container terminal. Fishermans Bend has a single large reserve known as Westgate Park, a large artificial wetland.

== Redevelopment ==
=== 2012 rezoning ===
In 2012, Planning Minister Matthew Guy under the State Government of Ted Baillieu made a surprise decision to rezone 250 hectares of Fishermans Bend from urban industrial land to mixed use, placing the area as part of Melbourne's Capital City Zone. This move was highly controversial, as it led to a large increase in property prices for current land-owners before the provision of any public services or infrastructure. The rezoning delivered significant profits to land-owners in the area, including senior members of the Liberal Party. In the three years following the rezoning, 68 development applications for office and residential buildings were made, 46 of which were between 20 and 64 storeys high.

Chris Vedelago, Royce Millar and Clay Lucas of the Melbourne Age reported in 2014 that the rezoning cost the State Government up to $330 million to buy private land to convert to public parks and for other public uses. A 2015 report by an expert advisory committee appointed by Guy's Labor successor Richard Wynne found the rezoning lacked a clear rationale, lacked sufficient planning, and occurred before the State had developed a strategy for transport, local services or infrastructure. The committee report labelled the rezoning as "unprecedented in the developed world in the 21st century". The report argued:

The rezoning mistakenly assumed that the development of an urban renewal area could be managed by the exercise of the same controls and processes as the rest of the Capital City Zone which applies to the 'Hoddle Grid' and Southbank where there is a strong Municipal Strategic Statement, existing statutory design and development planning overlay controls, and where public transport, roads, open space, heritage overlays and building form are all in place. None of these factors applied in the Fishermans Bend Urban Renewal Area at the time of the rezoning.

In 2015 the State Government paid $30 million for a small industrial site on Buckhurst Street in Fishermans Bend to create a public park, five times its value eight years prior.

=== Urban renewal framework ===
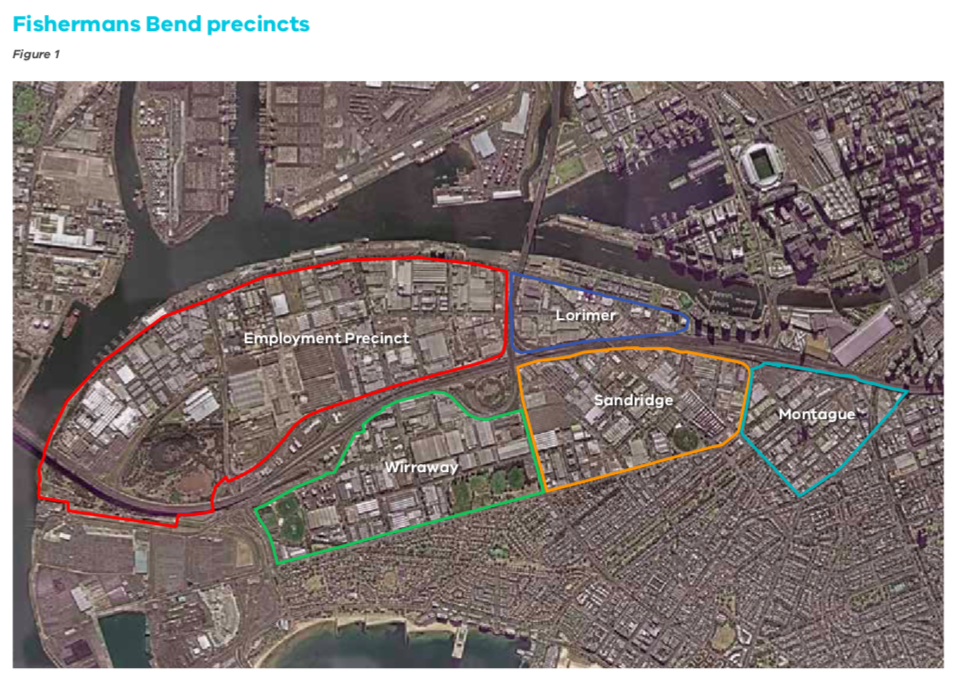
Map showing the new precincts in Fishermans Bend

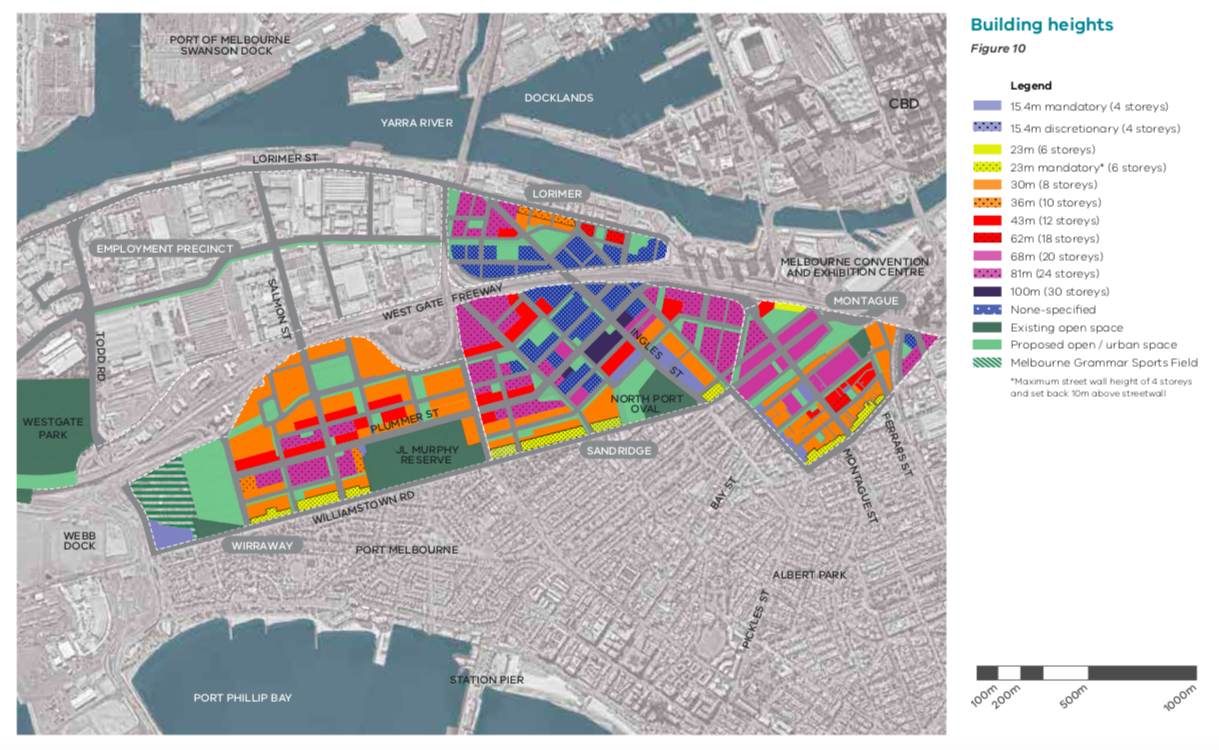
Map showing the height controls mandated in the 2018 Fishermans Bend Framework

Following the 2014 Victorian state election in 2015 the new Labor State Government introduced interim planning controls, seeking to reset the planning approach to the precinct. The Government expanded the Fishermans Bend regeneration area to include the City of Melbourne's industrial precinct along the river's edge, bringing the total urban renewal area to 480 hectares. In early 2018 the State Government put a hold on all development applications in the precinct until permanent planning controls were put in place, citing the height of proposed developments.

In 2017 the University of Melbourne announced it was building an advanced manufacturing, engineering and design campus in the Fishermans Bend Employment Precinct. Stage one of the new campus was initially set to open in 2026. The university spent $49.8 million to buy seven hectares in the precinct, in the old General Motors Holden site. In September 2025, the university announced that it had paused work on the campus and was set to review its timing by 2030.

After a public engagement process, a new planning framework and strategy for Fishermans Bend was released in October 2018. The plan introduced new planning controls, restricted building heights, mandated building set-backs and articulated the location of future open space, schools and public transport. It defined the creation of five new suburbs in Fishermans Bend:

- Fishermans Bend Employment Precinct
- Lorimer
- Wirraway
- Sandridge
- Montague

The Framework aimed for 80,000 jobs and 80,000 residents in the area by 2050.

=== Public transport links ===
Along with new planning controls, the 2018 Framework proposed two tram lines through Fishermans Bend: one running through the new suburbs of Sandridge and Wirraway along Plummer Street, and the other running through Lorimer and the Employment Precinct along Turner Street. The Framework gives a 'medium term' delivery timeframe of 2020–2025, while Infrastructure Australia also identified the project as a 'medium term' priority. The 2019-2020 state budget allocated $4.5 million to plan the tram routes to Fishermans Bend and develop a preliminary business case for the project.

The Framework also outlined two possible options for metro stations as part of the proposed Melbourne Metro 2 tunnel, which would connect the Werribee line with the Mernda line through a new underground rail link. After the release of the plan, industry figures and some media outlets called for funding for the proposed public transport links.

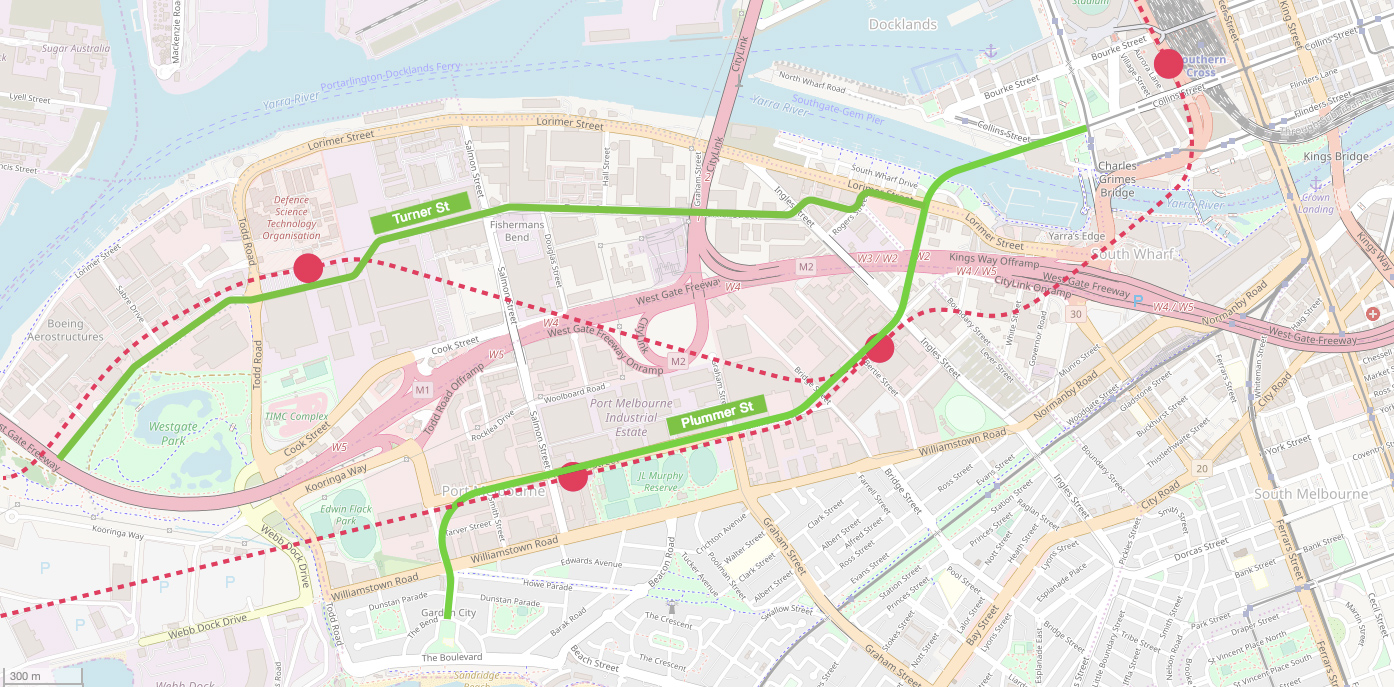
Map showing the two proposed extensions of the tram network through Fishermans Bend and two options for the proposed metro rail tunnel, according to the State Government's 2018 framework.

== Controversies ==
=== 2025 Victorian Auditor-General's Report ===
In June 2025, the Victorian Auditor-General's Office (VAGO) released a report titled "Developing Fishermans Bend," which assessed whether government agencies were on track to deliver the Fishermans Bend Framework. The audit concluded that responsible agencies were not on track to deliver all projects and outcomes outlined in the Framework as originally intended. The report highlighted significant delays in planning and project delivery, leading to an extension of the Framework's timeline by at least five years, from 2050 to 2055. The Framework, released in 2018, indicated that key planning documents for the precinct would be completed by 2019. However, six years later, many of these documents including the Precinct Implementation Plans (PIPs) and the Development Contributions Plan (DCP) remain in draft form or are yet to be finalised. The report notes that this has left a lack of detailed planning to guide development and support cross-agency efforts. The delays were attributed to various factors, including the COVID-19 pandemic, a reduction in staff size, and machinery of government (MoG) changes. While all five short-term projects (2018–2020) were delivered on time, the same cannot be said for medium and long-term projects. Of the 18 revised medium-term projects (2020–2025), only four have been completed, with the remaining 14 delayed or deferred by up to 21 years from their original planned dates. The report found that the Department of Transport and Planning still needs to confirm project plans, funding sources, and delivery timeframes for 12 of the 23 long-term projects. The audit pointed to a lack of a comprehensive transport plan for the state as a contributing factor to missed opportunities in sequencing and optimising the benefits of major transport investments.
