= 1993 Australian Drivers' Championship =

Motor racing competition

Seasons
- ← 1992 1994 →

The 1993 Australian Drivers' Championship was a motor racing competition open to drivers of racing cars complying with CAMS Formula Brabham regulations. The championship winner was awarded the 1993 CAMS Gold Star.

== Calendar ==
The title was contested over a six-round series:

- Round 1, Symmons Plains, Tasmania, 14 March 1993
- Round 2, Symmons Plains, Tasmania, 14 March 1993
- Round 3, Lakeside, Queensland, 18 April 1993
- Round 4, Lakeside, Queensland, 18 April 1993
- Round 5, Eastern Creek, New South Wales, 6 June 1993
- Round 6, Eastern Creek, New South Wales, 6 June 1993

Championship points were awarded to the first ten finishers in each round on a 20–15–12–10–8–6–4–3–2–1 basis. All six performances were included when calculating a driver's final points total.

== Results ==
Position	Driver	No.	Car	Entrant	Rd 1	Rd 2	Rd 3	Rd 4	Rd 5	Rd 6	Total
1	Mark Skaife	1	Lola T91/50 Holden	Winfield Racing	15	20	15	20	20	20	110
2	Mark Larkham	2	Reynard 91D Holden	Mitre 10 Racing	20	12	20	-	15	15	82
3	Paul Stokell	9	Reynard 90D Holden	Birrana Racing	12	15	12	-	-	12	51
4	Alan Galloway	3	Reynard 90D Holden	Alan Galloway	10	8	8	15	2	-	43
5	Albert Callegher	99	Ralt RT21 Holden	Australian Racing Enterprises	6	10	6	12	-	4	38
6	Chris Hocking	74	Reynard 90D Holden	GL Knight & Associates	8	-	-	-	10	6	24
7	John Hermann	8	Herco-Ralt Holden; Ralt RT20 Holden	John Hermann	4	3	3	10	1	2	23
8	Mark Poole	5	Shrike NB89H Holden		-	-	-	-	12	10	22
8	Rick Fabri	14	Hocking 911 Holden	GL Knight & Associates	3	6	4	8	-	1	22
10	David Hardman	4 & 7	Reynard 90D Holden	David Hardman	-	-	10	-	6	-	16
10	Kevin Weeks	70	Reynard 91D Holden	Kevin Weeks	-	-	-	-	8	8	16
12	Brian Sampson	78	Cheetah Mk9 Holden		-	-	-	-	3	3	6
13	Mark McLaughlin	11	Ralt RT21 Holden		-	-	-	-	4	-	4
13	Paul Collins	88	Liston BF3 Holden	Paul Collins	-	4	-	-	-	-	4
