= Mark Larkham =

Australian racing driver

- Nationality: (Australia) Australian
- Born: Mark Andrew Larkham; 29 December 1963 (age 62) Griffith, New South Wales

ATCC / V8 Supercar
- Years active: 1995-2004
- Teams: Larkham Motor Sport
- Starts: 104
- Wins: 2
- Poles: 1
- Best finish: 11th in 1998

Previous series
- 1988-89 1990 1990-93: Formula Ford Series; Australian Production Cars; Australian Drivers' Champ.

Championship titles
- 1989 1993: Formula Ford Series; Indonesian Grand Prix

Mark Andrew "Larko" Larkham (born 29 December 1963 in Griffith) is a retired Australian racing driver, former racing team owner and television commentator.

== Open wheelers ==
Larkham's first impressions on the national racing spotlight was finishing fifth in the 1988 Motorcraft Formula Ford Driver to Europe Series. The following year with the support of the front running Coffey Ford team, Larkham won the 1989 series creating an early rivalry with Russell Ingall. This was highlighted by their first corner clash at Mallala where Larkham and Ingall collided.

Forming his own Larkham Motor Sport team, Larkham made a brief attempt at running a Ford EA Falcon in the 1991 Australian Production Car Championship and returned to open-wheelers at the wheel of a Ralt RT20 in Formula Brabham. In his first season Larkham finished third in the 1991 Australian Drivers' Championship and was the only driver to take a win away from Mark Skaife. The following year Larkham imported a Reynard 90D, the first driver to exploit the relaxation of Formula Brabham rules which had previously prevented cars constructed of carbon-fibre. It was not enough to defeat Skaife however and Larkham ended runner up.

In 1993, Larkham again raced head-to-head with Skaife, now also sporting a carbon-fibre car, and again Larkham lost the title to Skaife. Larkham did however claim Formula Brabham's first international event, the 1993 Indonesian Grand Prix.

== Touring cars ==
Larkham's first foray into touring car racing came at the 1989 Pepsi 300 at the Oran Park Raceway in Sydney where he was to co-drive a 560 hp (418 kW; 568 PS) Ford Sierra RS500 with nine time Bathurst winner Peter Brock. Brock qualified the car on pole, but Larkham didn't get to drive as the car was retired with a suspected blown head gasket after only 13 of the 100 laps. Larkham stayed with the Mobil 1 Racing team for the 1989 .05 – 500 at Sandown where he was to drive the team's second Sierra alongside Brad Jones. After Brock's own car again failed to finish (after leading the first third of the race), the team boss joined Jones and Larkham in the #105 car, going on to finish 7th outright. Larkham missed a place in the team for that years Tooheys 1000 at Bathurst when the team was joined by British Sierra expert Andy Rouse. The Brock team had switched to Sierra's at the start of 1989 using car's purchased from Rouse with part of the deal being that the multiple BTCC winner would be Brock's co-driver at Bathurst. Co-driving with Jones in the car Larkham drove at Sandown was young Kiwi hotshot Paul Radisich who unlike Larkham had previous Bathurst experience. Larkham would not make his Bathurst debut for another 6 years.

Larkham spent the next four years driving Formula Holden/Brabham before spending 1994 out of the sport. Larkham's team then stepped into 5.0L Touring Cars in 1995 with a Ford EF Falcon using an innovative car design, bringing their open wheel experience and principles to touring car racing, though the team had a troubled season and failed to score a single point. Some of their innovations spread across the sport however. The team gradually improved, a highlight was third place at the 1997 Primus 1000 Classic at Bathurst, working themselves into a position where it could attract international quality co-drivers. By 1998 much of vehicle preparation was being handled by Stone Brothers Racing, promoting Larkham into a race winning combination, the win finally coming at the 1998 Surfers Paradise Indycar event. 1999 continued improved performances with Larkham taking pole position at the Bathurst 1000. During this time Larkham also first served on the board of TEGA.

In 2003, the team expanded to a second car with 2000 Bathurst 1000 winner Jason Bargwanna taking on lead driving role. Larkham scaled back his driving involvement with 2003 V8 Development Series winner Mark Winterbottom taking Larkham's place as full-time driver. Larkham's final racing drive was at the 2004 Bathurst 1000. After the 2005 season, Larkham Motor Sport was sold into the WPS Racing, with Larkham taking over team management role with WPS, however this did not last the season and Larkham retired from the sport.

== Television ==
Larkham returned to the sport as part of Channel 7's television broadcast coverage of V8 Supercar. Larkham has been used as their on air technical guru, explaining to the wider audience V8 Supercar's intricacies. Larkham also acts as one of the pit reporters during the races. Larkham also acts as frequent guest and occasional co-host with Neil Crompton and Mark Skaife of V8 Xtra program.

For 2015, the television rights for V8 Supercars moved from Channel 7 to a split deal between Network Ten and Foxtel, and Larkham moved from Channel 7 to Network Ten. He remains involved with their V8 Supercars coverage along with Matt White, as well as being a specialist on the motorsports panel show RPM

Larkham also serves on the board of the Australian Institute for Motor Sport Safety.

== Career results ==
Season	Series	Position	Car	Team
1987	Motorcraft Formula Ford Driver to Europe Series	21st	Van Diemen RF81-Ford	Australian Sheet & Coil Pty Ltd
1988	Motorcraft Formula Ford Driver to Europe Series	5th	Van Diemen-Ford	
1989	Motorcraft Formula Ford Driver to Europe Series	**1st**	Van Diemen RF89-Ford	Coffey Ford Motorsport
1990	Australian Drivers' Championship	11th	Ralt RT21 Holden	Thalgo Racing Team
1991	Australian Drivers' Championship	**3rd**	Ralt RT20-Holden	Larkham Motor Sport
1991	Australian Production Car Championship	11th	Ford EA Falcon	
1992	Australian Drivers' Championship	**2nd**	Reynard 90D-Holden	Mitre 10 Racing
1993	Australian Drivers' Championship	**2nd**	Reynard 91D-Holden	Mitre 10 Racing
1995	Australian Touring Car Championship	NC	Ford EF Falcon	Mitre 10 Racing
1996	Australian Touring Car Championship	NC	Ford EF Falcon	Mitre 10 Racing
1997	Australian Touring Car Championship	15th	Ford EL Falcon	Mitre 10 Racing
1998	Australian Touring Car Championship	11th	Ford EL Falcon	Larkham Motor Sport
1999	Shell Championship Series	21st	Ford AU Falcon	Larkham Motor Sport
2000	Shell Championship Series	14th	Ford AU Falcon	Larkham Motor Sport
2001	Shell Championship Series	19th	Ford AU Falcon	Larkham Motor Sport
2002	V8 Supercar Championship Series	22nd	Ford AU Falcon	Larkham Motor Sport
2003	V8 Supercar Championship Series	25th	Ford AU Falcon; Ford BA Falcon	Larkham Motor Sport
2004	V8 Supercar Championship Series	53rd	Ford BA Falcon	Larkham Motor Sport

=== Supercars Championship results ===
(Races in bold indicate pole position) (Races in italics indicate fastest lap)

Supercars results
Year	Team	Car	1	2	3	4	5	6	7	8	9	10	11	12	13	14	15	16	17	18	19	20	21	22	23	24	25	26	27	28	29	30	31	32	33	34	35	36	37	38	39	Position	Points
1995	Larkham Motor Sport	Ford Falcon (EF)	SAN; R1	SAN; R2	SYM; R3	SYM; R4	BAT; R5; Ret	BAT; R6; Ret	PHI; R7; Ret	PHI; R8; Ret	LAK; R9; 15	LAK; R10; DNS	WIN; R11; 12	WIN; R12; 13	EAS; R13; Ret	EAS; R14; 12	MAL; R15; 11	MAL; R16; Ret	BAR; R17; 13	BAR; R18; 13	ORA; R19; Ret	ORA; R20; Ret																				NC	0
1996	Larkham Motor Sport	Ford Falcon (EF)	EAS; R1; Ret	EAS; R2; Ret	EAS; R3; Ret	SAN; R4; Ret	SAN; R5; 20	SAN; R6; 12	BAT; R7; 16	BAT; R8; 13	BAT; R9; DNS	SYM; R10; 13	SYM; R11; 15	SYM; R12; 11	PHI; R13; Ret	PHI; R14; DNS	PHI; R15; Ret	CAL; R16; 14	CAL; R17; DNS	CAL; R18; DNS	LAK; R19; 13	LAK; R20; 15	LAK; R21; 11	BAR; R22; 12	BAR; R23; 14	BAR; R24; 11	MAL; R25; Ret	MAL; R26; DNS	MAL; R27; DNS	ORA; R28	ORA; R29	ORA; R30										NC	0
1997	Larkham Motor Sport	Ford Falcon (EL)	CAL; R1; 12	CAL; R2; 16	CAL; R3; 19	PHI; R4; Ret	PHI; R5; DNS	PHI; R6; DNS	SAN; R7; 13	SAN; R8; 15	SAN; R9; Ret	SYM; R10; 11	SYM; R11; 13	SYM; R12; 10	WIN; R13; 10	WIN; R14; 8	WIN; R15; 10	EAS; R16; 16	EAS; R17; 16	EAS; R18; 12	LAK; R19; Ret	LAK; R20; DNS	LAK; R21; DNS	BAR; R22; 9	BAR; R23; 11	BAR; R24; 9	MAL; R25; 9	MAL; R26; Ret	MAL; R27; 16	ORA; R28; 13	ORA; R29; 16	ORA; R30; 8										15th	134
1998	Larkham Motor Sport	Ford Falcon (EL)	SAN; R1; 16	SAN; R2; 7	SAN; R3; 7	SYM; R4; Ret	SYM; R5; 11	SYM; R6; 13	LAK; R7; Ret	LAK; R8; 14	LAK; R9; 11	PHI; R10; 12	PHI; R11; 11	PHI; R12; 16	WIN; R13; 15	WIN; R14; 15	WIN; R15; Ret	MAL; R16; 15	MAL; R17; 10	MAL; R18; 13	BAR; R19; 12	BAR; R20; 11	BAR; R21; 8	CAL; R22; 12	CAL; R23; 8	CAL; R24; C	HID; R25; 3	HID; R26; 12	HID; R27; 5	ORA; R28; 9	ORA; R29; 7	ORA; R30; 10										11th	474
1999	Larkham Motor Sport	Ford Falcon (AU)	EAS; R1; 14	EAS; R2; 26	EAS; R3; 13	ADE; R4; Ret	BAR; R5; 18	BAR; R6; 14	BAR; R7; 12	PHI; R8; Ret	PHI; R9; 15	PHI; R10; Ret	HID; R11; 26	HID; R12; 16	HID; R13; 7	SAN; R14; 15	SAN; R15; 15	SAN; R16; 14	QLD; R17; 10	QLD; R18; 13	QLD; R19; 10	CAL; R20; 28	CAL; R21; 14	CAL; R22; 14	SYM; R23; 15	SYM; R24; Ret	SYM; R25; 13	WIN; R26; 28	WIN; R27; 19	WIN; R28; 25	ORA; R29; 21	ORA; R30; Ret	ORA; R31; Ret	QLD; R32; 16	**BAT**; **R33**; **Ret**							21st	619
2000	Larkham Motor Sport	Ford Falcon (AU)	PHI; R1; 8	PHI; R2; 7	BAR; R3; 7	BAR; R4; 6	BAR; R5; 6	ADE; R6; 27	ADE; R7; 13	EAS; R8; 29	EAS; R9; 20	EAS; R10; 11	HID; R11; 5	HID; R12; 4	HID; R13; 3	CAN; R14; 17	CAN; R15; 11	CAN; R16; Ret	QLD; R17; 3	QLD; R18; 5	QLD; R19; 5	WIN; R20; 19	WIN; R21; 17	WIN; R22; 12	ORA; R23; 12	ORA; R24; 26	ORA; R25; Ret	CAL; R26; 6	CAL; R27; 1	CAL; R28; 4	QLD; R29; Ret	SAN; R30; 7	SAN; R31; 5	SAN; R32; 5	BAT; R33; 18							14th	718
2001	Larkham Motor Sport	Ford Falcon (AU)	PHI; R1; 16	PHI; R2; Ret	ADE; R3; 11	ADE; R4; 24	EAS; R5; 22	EAS; R6; 21	HID; R7; 3	HID; R8; 13	HID; R9; 11	CAN; R10; 18	CAN; R11; 9	CAN; R12; 8	BAR; R13; 21	BAR; R14; 20	BAR; R15; DNS	CAL; R16; 16	CAL; R17; 13	CAL; R18; 12	ORA; R19; Ret	ORA; R20; 20	QLD; R21; 16	WIN; R22; 9	WIN; R23; Ret	BAT; R24; Ret	PUK; R25; Ret	PUK; R26; 16	PUK; R27; 10	SAN; R28; Ret	SAN; R29; 24	SAN; R30; 18										19th	1326
2002	Larkham Motor Sport	Ford Falcon (AU)	ADE; R1; 14	ADE; R2; 11	PHI; R3; Ret	PHI; R4; 19	EAS; R5; 28	EAS; R6; 16	EAS; R7; 23	HID; R8; 16	HID; R9; 14	HID; R10; 17	CAN; R11; 20	CAN; R12; 12	CAN; R13; 21	BAR; R14; 19	BAR; R15; Ret	BAR; R16; Ret	ORA; R17; 27	ORA; R18; 18	WIN; R19; 28	WIN; R20; 24	QLD; R21; 11	BAT; R22; 18	SUR; R23; 21	SUR; R24; 22	PUK; R25; 23	PUK; R26; 17	PUK; R27; Ret	SAN; R28; 23	SAN; R29; 20											23rd	464
2003	Larkham Motor Sport	Ford Falcon (BA)	ADE; R1; 23	ADE; R1; 16	PHI; R3; 23	EAS; R4; 18	WIN; R5; 22	BAR; R6; 26	BAR; R7; 23	BAR; R8; 27	HID; R9; 26	HID; R10; 30	HID; R11; 21	QLD; R12; Ret	ORA; R13; 18	SAN; R14; 9	BAT; R15; Ret	SUR; R16; 18	SUR; R17; 17	PUK; R18; 27	PUK; R19; 20	PUK; R20; 23	EAS; R21; 19	EAS; R22; Ret																		25th	949
2004	Larkham Motor Sport	Ford Falcon (BA)	ADE; R1	ADE; R2	EAS; R3	PUK; R4	PUK; R5	PUK; R6	HID; R7	HID; R8	HID; R9	BAR; R10	BAR; R11	BAR; R12	QLD; R13	WIN; R14	ORA; R15	ORA; R16	SAN; R17; Ret	BAT; R18; 11	SUR; R19	SUR; R20	SYM; R21	SYM; R22	SYM; R23	EAS; R24	EAS; R25	EAS; R26														53rd	152

=== Complete Indonesian Grand Prix results ===
(key) (Races in bold indicate pole position; races in italics indicate fastest lap)

Year	Car	1	2	Rank	Points
1993	Reynard 91D Mugen-Honda	SEN; 1	SEN; 1	1st	40

=== Complete Bathurst 1000 results ===
Year	Team	Car	Co-driver	Position	Laps
1995	Larkham Motor Sport	Ford EF Falcon	(Australia) Warwick Rooklyn	DNF	22
1996	Larkham Motor Sport	Ford EF Falcon	(Australia) Cameron McConville	DNF	3
1997	Larkham Motor Sport	Ford EL Falcon	(Australia) Andrew Miedecke	**3rd**	161
1998	Larkham Motor Sport	Ford EL Falcon	(Australia) Brad Jones	4th	161
1999	Larkham Motor Sport	Ford AU Falcon	(Australia) Brad Jones	DNF	62
2000	Larkham Motor Sport	Ford AU Falcon	(Switzerland) Alain Menu	18th	154
2001	Larkham Motor Sport	Ford AU Falcon	(Australia) Wayne Gardner	DNF	106
2002	Larkham Motor Sport	Ford AU Falcon	(Australia) Will Power	18th	157
2003	Larkham Motor Sport	Ford BA Falcon	(Australia) Jason Bargwanna	DNF	118
2004	Larkham Motor Sport	Ford BA Falcon	(New Zealand) Matthew Halliday	11th	160
