= Simon Kane =

Australian racing driver

- Nationality: Australian
- Born: 9 October 1967 (age 59)

Previous series
- 1988 1989-92 1991 1993: Australian Formula Ford; Formula Holden; International Formula 3000; Indonesian Grand Prix

Championship titles
- 1990: Australian Drivers' Championship
- Statistics up to date as of 29 Nov 2011.

Simon Kane (born 9 October 1967 in Sydney, New South Wales) is an Australian former race car driver who has worked as a sound technician in television since the late 1980s where he began working for Australia's Nine Network on the 60 Minutes.

== Career ==
Kane started in Formula Fords in the late 1980s and proceeded to the new Formula Holden series in 1989. In 1990, he won the Australian Drivers' Championship and consequently CAMS Gold Star. From there, he had a disappointing International Formula 3000 season in 1991 for Italian team Motor Racing Di-Wheels, failing to qualify for the two events he entered at Hockenheim in Germany and Brands Hatch in England (rounds 6 & 7).

Kane then returned to Australia and spasmodically entered Australian Drivers' Championship rounds in coming years and achieved a top five result at the one-off 1993 Indonesian Grand Prix. He now races some club events in a Porsche 911.

== Career results ==
Season	Series	Position	Car	Team
1988	Motorcraft Formula Ford Driver to Europe Series	12th	Van Diemen – Ford	Clive Kane Photography
1989	Australian Drivers' Championship	5th	Ralt RT21 – Holden	Clive Kane Photography
1990	Australian Drivers' Championship	1st	Ralt RT21 – Holden	Clive Kane Photography
1991	Australian Drivers' Championship	5th	Ralt RT21 – Holden	Clive Kane Photography
1991	International Formula 3000	NC	Leyton House 90B Cosworth	M.R. Diwheel
1992	Australian Drivers' Championship	10th	Ralt RT21 – Holden	Clive Kane Photography
1993	Indonesian Grand Prix	4th	Ralt RT21 – Holden	Clive Kane Photography
2003	Australian Drivers' Championship	NC	Reynard 92D – Holden	Fremder Automotive
2006	Victorian Sports Car Championship	32nd	Porsche 993 RSCS	The Guild

== Complete International Formula 3000 results ==
(key) (Races in bold indicate pole position) (Races in italics indicate fastest lap)

Year	Entrant	1	2	3	4	5	6	7	8	9	10	DC	Points
1991	Motor Racing Di-Wheels	VAL	PAU	JER	MUG	PER	HOC; DNQ	BRH; DNQ	SPA	BUG	NOG	NC	0

=== Complete Indonesian Grand Prix results ===
Year	Car	1	2	Rank	Points
1993	Ralt RT21 Holden	SEN; 6	SEN; 4	5th	16

Sporting positions
Preceded by Rohan Onslow	Winner of the Australian Drivers' Championship; 1990	Succeeded by Mark Skaife
