= 1990 Australian Drivers' Championship =

Motor racing competition

Seasons
- ← 1989 1991 →

The 1990 Australian Drivers' Championship was an Australian motor racing title sanctioned by the Confederation of Australian Motor Sport and open to Formula Holden racing cars. It was the 34th Australian Drivers' Championship and the second to be contested by Formula Holden cars. The championship winner was awarded the CAMS Gold Star.

The championship was won by Simon Kane driving a Ralt RT21.

== Calendar ==
The championship was contested over eight rounds with one race per round.

Round	Race name	Circuit	State	Date	Winning driver	Winning car
1		Phillip Island	Victoria	25 March	Simon Kane	Ralt RT21
2		Winton	Victoria	8 April	John Briggs	Ralt RT21
3		Amaroo Park	New South Wales	27 May	Mark Poole	Shrike 003
4	ACL Trophy	Mallala	South Australia	10 June	Mark Skaife	SPA
5		Oran Park	New South Wales	19 August	Mark Skaife	SPA
6		Sandown	Victoria	9 September	Mark Poole	Shrike 003
7		Winton	Victoria	7 October	Simon Kane	Ralt RT21
8	Thalgo Trophy	Adelaide	South Australia	3 November	Neil Crompton	Ralt RT20

== Teams and drivers ==
The following teams and drivers competed in the 1990 Australian Drivers' Championship.

Team	Car	No	Driver
Skaife Racing	Spa FB001	3	(Australia) Mark Skaife
FAPM	Ralt RT20	4	(Australia) Roger Martin
Clive Kane Photography	Ralt RT21	5	(Australia) Simon Kane
Richard Davison	Ralt RT20	6	(Australia) Richard Davison
Boylan Racing	Ralt RT20	7	(Australia) Neil Crompton
John Briggs	Ralt RT21	9	(Australia) John Briggs
Thalgo Racing Team	Spa FB002	11	(Australia) Tony Blanche (Australia) Mark McLaughlin
Thalgo Racing Team	Ralt RT21	12	(Australia) Mark Larkham (Australia) Tony Blanche
TAFE Team Motorsport	Shrike NB89H	21	(Australia) Mark Poole
TAFE Team Motorsport	Shrike NB89H		(Australia) Wayne Gardner
David Mawer	Ralt RT21	27	(Australia) John Smith
Hocking Motorsport	Hocking 901	38	(Australia) Sam Astuti (Australia) Roger Martin
Hocking Motorsport	March 87B	73	(Australia) Mark McLaughlin (Australia) Domenic Beninca (Australia) Chris Hocking
Tenth Corporation P/L	Ralt RT20	39	(Australia) Drew Price
	Ralt RT4		(Australia) Paul Collins
Ray Cutchie	Ralt RT4		(Australia) Ray Cutchie (Australia) Brian Sampson
John Hermann	Liston BF3		(Australia) John Herrman
Mark Potter	Ralt RT4		(Australia) Mark Potter

=== Notes ===
- All Formula Holden cars were required to use a Holden V6 engine.
- Australian Formula 2 cars were invited to compete in the final three rounds to boost competitor numbers.

== Points system ==
Championship points were awarded on a 9–6–4–3–2–1 basis to the first six finishers at each round. Each driver could retain only his/her best seven results, any other points being discarded.

== Championship standings ==
Position	Driver	No.	Car	Entrant	Phi	Win	Ama	Mal	Ora	San	Win	Ade	Points
1	Simon Kane	5	Ralt RT21	Clive Kane Photography	9	6	6	4	(4)	6	9	6	46
2	Mark Poole	21	Shrike 003	TAFE Team Motorsport	4	3	9	6	2	9	6	–	39
3	Mark Skaife	3	Spa	Skaife Racing	2	1	–	9	9	2	–	–	23
4	Neil Crompton	7	Ralt RT20	Peter Boylan	–	2	3	1	6	–	–	9	21
4	Drew Price	39	Ralt RT20	Tenth Corporation P/L	6	4	4	–	3	4	–	–	21
6	John Briggs	9	Ralt RT21	John Briggs	3	9	–	3	–	–	–	2	17
7	Mark McLaughlin	73 & 11	March 87B; Ralt RT21; Spa	Chris Hocking; Thalgo Racing Team	–	–	–	2	1	–	4	4	11
8	Richard Davison	6	Ralt RT20	Richard Davison	1	–	–	–	–	3	–	3	7
9	Chris Hocking	38	Hocking 901	Chris Hocking	–	–	–	–	–	–	3	1	4
10	Tony Blanche	11 & 12	Ralt RT21	Thalgo Racing Team	–	–	–	–	–	1	2	–	3
11	Mark Larkham	12	Ralt RT21	Thalgo Cosmetic Racing	–	–	2	–	–	–	–	–	2
12	Roger Martin	4	Ralt RT20	FAPM	–	–	1	–	–	–	–	–	1
