= 1992 Australian Drivers' Championship =

Motor racing competition

Seasons
- ← 1991 1993 →

The 1992 Australian Drivers' Championship was a CAMS sanctioned motor racing title for drivers of Formula Brabham racing cars. The winner of the title, which was the 36th Australian Drivers' Championship, was awarded the 1992 CAMS Gold Star. Due to a sponsorship deal with beer brand Tooheys, the championship was promoted as the "Tooheys Australian Drivers' Championship".

== Calendar ==
The championship was contested over a five-round series with one race per round.

- Round 1, Sandown, Victoria, 3 March
- Round 2, Symmons Plains, Tasmania, 15 March
- Round 3, Winton, Victoria, 4 April
- Round 4, Eastern Creek, New South Wales, 24 may
- Round 5, Oran Park, New South Wales, 21 June

== Points system ==
Championship points were awarded on a 20–15–12–10–8–6–4–3–2–1 basis to the first ten finishers in each round.

== Results ==
Position	Driver	No.	Car	Entrant	R1	R2	R3	R4	R5	Total
1	Mark Skaife	1	Spa 003 Holden	Winfield Racing	15	20	15	20	20	90
2	Mark Larkham	3	Reynard 90D Holden	Larkham Motor Sport	4	15	20	15	15	69
3	Ron Barnacle	4	Ralt RT20 Holden		10	6	8	-	6	30
3	Drew Price	39	Ralt RT20 Holden		20	-	10	-	-	30
5	Chris Hocking	74	Hocking 911 Holden		2	10	-	-	8	20
6	Paul Collins	88	Liston BF3 Holden		-	1	2	10	4	17
7	Stephen Cramp	12	Reynard 90D Holden		12	3	-	-	-	15
8	Alan Galloway	7	Ralt RT21 Holden		6	4	4	-	-	14
8	Brian Sampson	78	Cheetah Mk9 Holden		8	-	6	-	-	14
10	Simon Kane	5	Ralt RT21 Holden		-	-	12	-	-	12
10	John Briggs	10	Ralt RT21 Holden	Briggs Motor Sport	-	12	-	-	-	12
10	Neil Crompton	20	Ralt RT20 Holden		-	-	-	-	12	12
10	Ron Searle	27	Shrike NB89H Holden; Ralt RT21 Holden		-	-	-	12	-	12
14	Warwick Rooklyn	10	Ralt RT21 Holden		-	-	-	-	10	10
15	Paul Stokell	15	Shrike NB89H Holden		-	8	-	-	-	8
16	John Hermann	8	Herco Ralt Holden		1	2	3	-	-	6
17	Graham Watson	88	Liston BF3 Holden		3	-	-	-	-	3
