= 1989 Australian Drivers' Championship =

Motor racing competition

Seasons
- ← 1988 1990 →

The 1989 Australian Drivers' Championship was an Australian motor racing competition open to racing cars complying with CAMS Formula Holden regulations. The championship winner was awarded the 1989 CAMS Gold Star as the Australian Drivers' Champion. It was the 33rd running of the Australian Drivers' Championship and the first to feature the Formula Holden class which had been developed during 1988, originally named Formula Australia.

The championship began on 7 May 1989 at Mallala Motor Sport Park and ended on 10 September at Sandown Raceway after ten rounds. Defending champion Rohan Onslow of Sydney won his second consecutive Australian Drivers' Championship driving a Ralt RT20. Mark McLaughlin, the winner of the inaugural Formula Holden race at Mallala, placed second in his Elfin FA891 (an Australian car designed and built specifically for the new category as opposed to the Ralt's which were sourced from Formula 3000 racing overseas). Channel 7 television commentator and then sometime touring car driver Neil Crompton finished third in his debut year in open wheel racing driving an ex-Satoru Nakajima Ralt RT20.

== Teams and drivers ==
The following teams and drivers competed in the 1989 Australian Drivers' Championship.

Team	Car	No	Driver
R.J.Macarthur Onslow	Ralt RT20	1	(Australia) Rohan Onslow
Tony Blanche	Ralt RT21	3	(Australia) Tony Blanche
Competitive Edge	Ralt RT20	4	(Australia) Roger Martin
Clive Kane Photography	Ralt RT21	5	(Australia) Simon Kane
Elfin Sports Cars	Elfin FA891	6	(Australia) Mark McLaughlin
Boylan Racing	Ralt RT20	7	(Australia) Neil Crompton
Bap Romano	Spa FB001	8	(Australia) Bap Romano
Cascone Corporation	Spa FB001	8; 12	(Australia) Sam Astuti
John Briggs	Ralt RT21	9	(Australia) John Briggs
Ray Cutchie	Ralt RT4	11	(Australia) Ray Cutchie
Brian Shead	Cheetah Mk.9	13	(Australia) Peter Glover
TAFE Team Motorsport	Shrike NB89H	18	(Australia) Arthur Abrahams (Australia) Ian Richards
TAFE Team Motorsport	Shrike NB89H	20	(Australia) Peter Doulman (Australia) Mark Poole
David Mawer	Ralt RT21	27	(Australia) Elwyn Bickley (Australia) John Smith
Brett Fisher	Liston BF3	50	(Australia) Brett Fisher
Chris Hocking	87B	74	(Australia) Chris Hocking (Australia) Rohan Onslow
John Hermann	Ralt RT4	88	(Australia) John Herrman

Note: All cars were required by the Formula Holden regulations to be fitted with 3.8 litre Holden V6 engines.

== Race calendar ==
The 1989 Australian Drivers' Championship was contested over ten rounds at five race meetings.

Rd.	Circuit	Location / state	Date	Winner	Team
1	Mallala Motor Sport Park	Mallala, South Australia	7 May	Mark McLaughlin	Elfin Sports Cars
2	Mallala Motor Sport Park	Mallala, South Australia	7 May	Rohan Onslow	R.J.Macarthur Onslow
3	Winton Motor Raceway	Benalla, Victoria	4 June	Rohan Onslow	R.J.Macarthur Onslow
4	Winton Motor Raceway	Benalla, Victoria	4 June	John Briggs	John Briggs
5	Oran Park Raceway	Sydney, New South Wales	9 July	Rohan Onslow	R.J.Macarthur Onslow
6	Oran Park Raceway	Sydney, New South Wales	9 July	Rohan Onslow	R.J.Macarthur Onslow
7	Amaroo Park	Sydney, New South Wales	6 August	Neil Crompton	Boylan Racing
8	Amaroo Park	Sydney, New South Wales	6 August	Simon Kane	Clive Kane Photography
9	Sandown International Raceway	Melbourne, Victoria	10 September	Sam Astuti	Cascone Corporation
10	Sandown International Raceway	Melbourne, Victoria	10 September	Neil Crompton	Boylan Racing

== Points system ==
Championship points were awarded 9–6–4–3–2–1 based on the top six race positions at each round.

== Results ==
Pos	Driver	Rd 1	Rd 2	Rd 3	Rd 4	Rd 5	Rd 6	Rd 7	Rd 8	Rd 9	Rd 10	Pts
1	Rohan Onslow	5th	1st	1st	Ret	1st	1st	Ret	6th	2nd	3rd	49
2	Mark McLaughlin	1st	2nd	2nd	2nd	DNS	3rd	2nd	3rd	Ret	Ret	41
3	Neil Crompton	3rd	5th	Ret	3rd	2nd	6th	1st	DNS	3rd	1st	39
4	Sam Astuti			Ret	DNS	4th	4th	3rd	2nd	1st	2nd	31
5	Simon Kane	DNS	DNS	4th	4th	7th	2nd	5th	1st	Ret	DNS	23
5	John Briggs	4th	6th	3rd	1st	Ret	8th			4th	4th	23
7	Peter Glover	2nd	3rd	6th	DNS							11
8	Chris Hocking			5th	5th	6th	5th	7th	DNS	5th	DNS	9
9	Peter Doulman	9th	Ret					6th	4th	6th	5th	7
10	Mark Poole					3rd	Ret					4
11	Bap Romano	Ret	4th									3
11	John Smith							4th	DNS			3
11	Tony Blanche	Ret	DNS	Ret	Ret	8th	7th	8th	5th	DNS	6th	3
14	Ian Richards					5th	Ret			8th	Ret	2
15	Ray Cutchie	7th	8th	7th	6th					7th	Ret	1
15	Brett Fisher	6th	9th			Ret	Ret					1
Pos	Driver	Rd 1	Rd 2	Rd 3	Rd 4	Rd 5	Rd 6	Rd 7	Rd 8	Rd 9	Rd 10	Pts

Colour	Result
Gold	Winner
Silver	Second place
Bronze	Third place
Green	Points classification
Blue	Non-points classification
Blue	Non-classified finish (NC)
Purple	Retired, not classified (Ret)
Red	Did not qualify (DNQ)
Red	Did not pre-qualify (DNPQ)
Black	Disqualified (DSQ)
White	Did not start (DNS)
White	Withdrew (WD)
White	Race cancelled (C)
Blank	Did not practice (DNP)
Blank	Did not arrive (DNA)
Blank	Excluded (EX)
