= Shrike (racing car) =

Australian race car

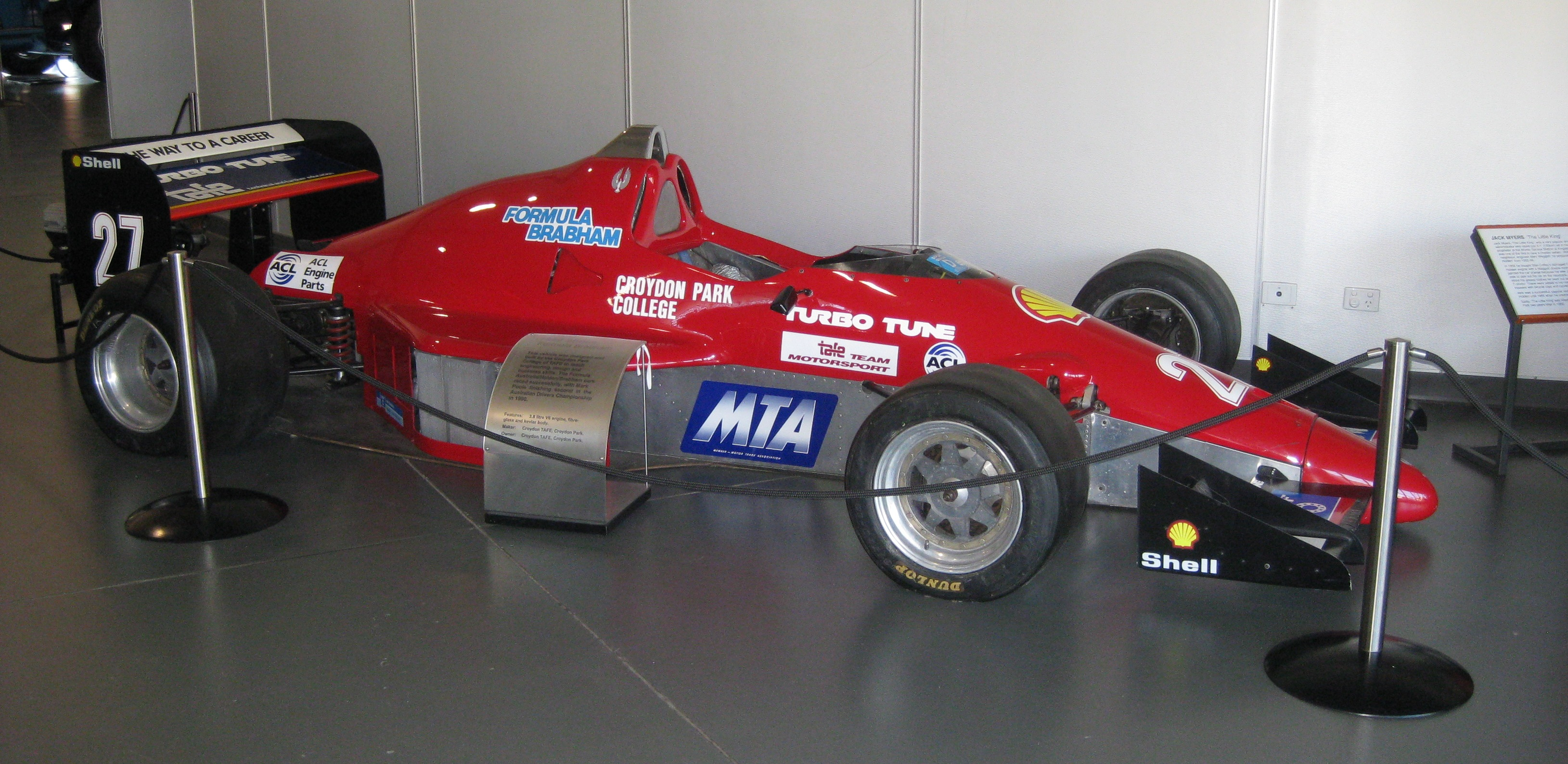
Shrike NB89H

Shrike is a racing car developed in Australia by the students of the Croydon Park Institute of TAFE in Adelaide in 1988 and 1989. It was developed for the then new Formula Holden category which mandated an aluminium tub monocoque, powered by a Buick sourced 3.8 litre Holden V6 engine, as used in the Holden VN Commodore at that time.

The car proved to be instantly competitive in the Australian Drivers' Championship against designs from Elfin (then another Adelaide based company), Cheetah, and imported Formula 3000 chassis such as those made by Ralt, Reynard and Lola.

== Concept ==
The Shrike (named after the bird on the Flag of South Australia, the Piping shrike with the cars emblem being a modified version of the bird on the flag) was the brainchild of automotive engineering lecturer at Croyden Park, Ted Noack. His concept was to utilise the newly acquired skills of the TAFE students to help build and race the cars. In a stroke of genius, Noack was able to convince the then South Australian state Minister of Education Greg Crafter to fund the Shrike project as part of a technical education syllabus.

The Shrike made its first public appearance in a demonstration run during the 1988 Australian Grand Prix in Adelaide driven by Adelaide's own 1983 Australian Formula 2 champion, Ian Richards.

== Racing ==
The Shrike made its racing debut at the inaugural round of Formula Holden in 1989 at the Mallala Motorsport Park in South Australia with Arthur Abrahams and Peter Doulman doing the driving.

Adelaide based driver Mark Poole placed second in the 1990 Australian Drivers' Championship at the wheel of a Clipsal sponsored Shrike. Poole won Round 3 of the championship at Sydney's tight Amaroo Park circuit, as well as Round 6 at the fast Sandown Raceway in Melbourne, proving that the car could win on almost any type of circuit. Poole went into the final round of the series at the 1990 Australian Grand Prix meeting at the Adelaide Street Circuit only one point behind Ralt driver Simon Kane. However, a DNF for the Shrike due to a holed radiator handed the title to Kane who finished the race in second place behind Channel 7 motor sport commentator and series contender Neil Crompton.

Australia's 1987 500cc Grand Prix motorcycle World Champion Wayne Gardner was also to have driven a Shrike in the race at the 1990 AGP, but a qualifying crash into the wall just past the chicane at the end of the pit straight ended his chances. Gardner had spun on coolant that had been dropped by the Ralt RT20 of Drew Price, though he was hopeful of having the car repaired for the race. However his chances ended when another car also spun on the coolant and crashed into the Shrike only moments after Gardner had departed the car and escaped over the outside wall. Prior to his crash, Gardner had qualified in a credible 11th place for his first open wheel drive. Gardner only flew into Adelaide on the day of opening practice (Thursday) after having spent the previous week at Suzuka in Japan testing the Honda NSR500 he was to race in the 1991 500cc World Championship.

Five cars, referred to as the NB89H, were built, and continued to be raced in Formula Holden into the late 1990s. While the Shrike never won a championship series, it did take race wins against the more highly developed ex-Formula 3000 cars at different types of circuits from the tight, high downforce Amaroo Park raceway in Sydney to the low downforce, "power circuit" of Sandown Raceway in Melbourne.

== Complete Australian Drivers' Championship results ==
(key) (results in bold indicate pole position; results in italics indicate fastest lap)

Year	Chassis	Engine	Drivers	1	2	3	4	5	6	7	8	9	10	Points	POS
1989	NB89H	Holden		MAL	MAL	WIN	WIN	OPK	OPK	AMP	AMP	SAN	SAN		
1989	NB89H	Holden	(Australia) Peter Doulman	9th	Ret					6th	4th	6th	5th	7	9th
1989	NB89H	Holden	(Australia) Arthur Abrahams	Ret	Ret	DNS	DNS							0	N/C
1989	NB89H	Holden	(Australia) Ian Richards					5th	Ret			8th	Ret	2	14th
1989	NB89H	Holden	(Australia) Mark Poole					3rd	Ret					4	10th
1990	NB89H	Holden		PHI	WIN	AMP	MAL	OPK	SAN	WIN	ADL				
1990	NB89H	Holden	(Australia) Mark Poole	3rd	4th	1st	2nd	5th	1st	2nd	Ret			39	2nd
1990	NB89H	Holden	(Australia) Wayne Gardner								DNS			0	N/C
1991	NB89H	Holden		ECK	ECK	ECK	ECK	ECK	ECK	ECK					
1991	NB89H	Holden	(Australia) Paul Morris	5th	3rd	2nd	5th	2nd	5th	5th				66	4th
1991	NB89H	Holden	(Australia) Mark Poole	4th	5th	4th								28	6th
1991	NB89H	Holden	(Australia) Warwick Rooklyn	7th		5th	4th							22	7th
1991	NB89H	Holden	(Australia) Ron Searle						6th	6th				12	12th
