= Australian Drivers' Championship =

Sport competition

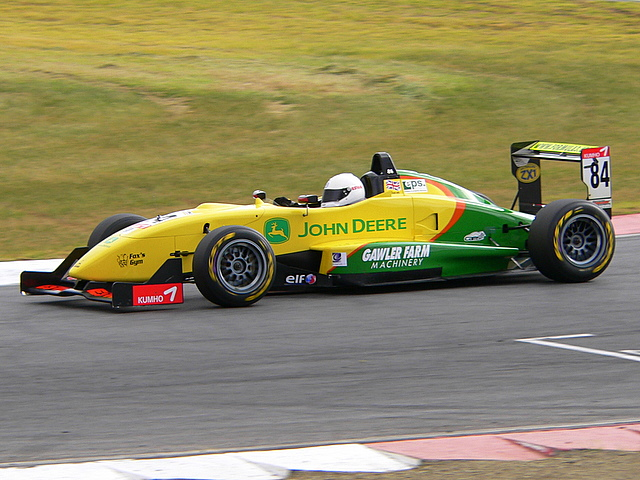
- Ben Clucas (Dallara F304), winner of the 2006 championship
- Category: Open wheel racing
- Country: Australia
- Inaugural season: 1957

The Australian Drivers' Championship is a motor racing championship contested annually since 1957 by drivers of cars complying with Australia's premier open-wheeler racing category. This category was determined by the Confederation of Australian Motor Sport until 2023. From 2024 the championship is contested by drivers of cars complying with Australia's premier open-wheeler racing category as determined by the Australian Auto Sport Alliance. Each year, the winner is awarded a Gold Star - from 1957 - 2023 the CAMS Gold Star and from 2024 the AASA Gold Star.

The Australian Drivers' Championship is the third oldest continuously awarded title in Australian motorsport, with only the Australian Grand Prix (since 1928) and the Australian Hillclimb Championship having a longer uninterrupted history. While originally intended to be the premier prize for domestic motor racing it had faded in importance over time and from the 1980s had been effectively a feeder series for the Australian Touring Car Championship and V8 Supercars Championship, or a launch pad for drivers to start international careers.

2024, under the new stewardship of the AASA, saw a historic change of direction. With the objective of finding the most talented drivers in Australia, the premier open-wheel racing category was re-imagined and now serves as a showcase for drivers whose driving talent is a valued asset. This new focus aims at making the championship more accessible and competitive by substantially reducing costs thereby allowing financially challenged drivers the opportunity to demonstrate their driving skills. The car chosen to enable this change is the Hyper Racer X1, designed and manufactured in Australia.

== History ==
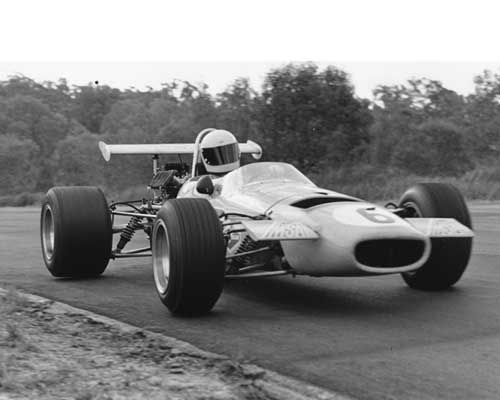
Max Stewart (Mildren Waggott), winner of the 1971 championship

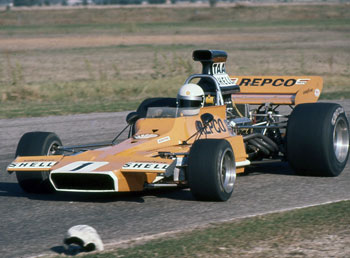
Frank Matich (Matich A50 Repco Holden), winner of the 1972 championship.

The first title in 1957 was open in regulation, effectively Formula Libre. While the age of the 'Australian special', handbuilt racecars developed by local mechanic/engineers away from the European/American manufacturers that had dominated pre-World War II racing, was not yet dead, most notably the series of Maybach specials were still competitive as second-hand Formula 1 and Formula 2 cars from Europe became increasingly popular with competitors, with the Maserati 250F finding a few homes in the top echelon of drivers.

The rise of Cooper in Europe, led by Jack Brabham, Bruce McLaren and the rest of the Australian/New Zealand invasion that flooded into Formula 1 in the 1960s, saw a trickle down effect increase as the smaller cheaper rear-engined packages proved quickly popular amongst competitors. The competitive nature of the racing as well as the reputation of antipodean personnel in Europe saw the factory teams look towards racing in Australia/New Zealand during the European winter. This led to the development of the Tasman Series regulations and a flood of Coopers and Brabhams into Australian racing, as well as encouraging the rise of domestic manufacturers like Elfin Sports Cars.

As the Tasman series faded there was a considerable push for a two-litre open formula to replace the Tasman regulations, however with Formula 5000 already having a strong foothold with competitors two-litre fell by the wayside. While F5000 was popular by this stage the Australian Touring Car Championship had surpassed it for popularity, a situation that would continue until today where the Australian Drivers' Championship is now seen as a young driver development category.

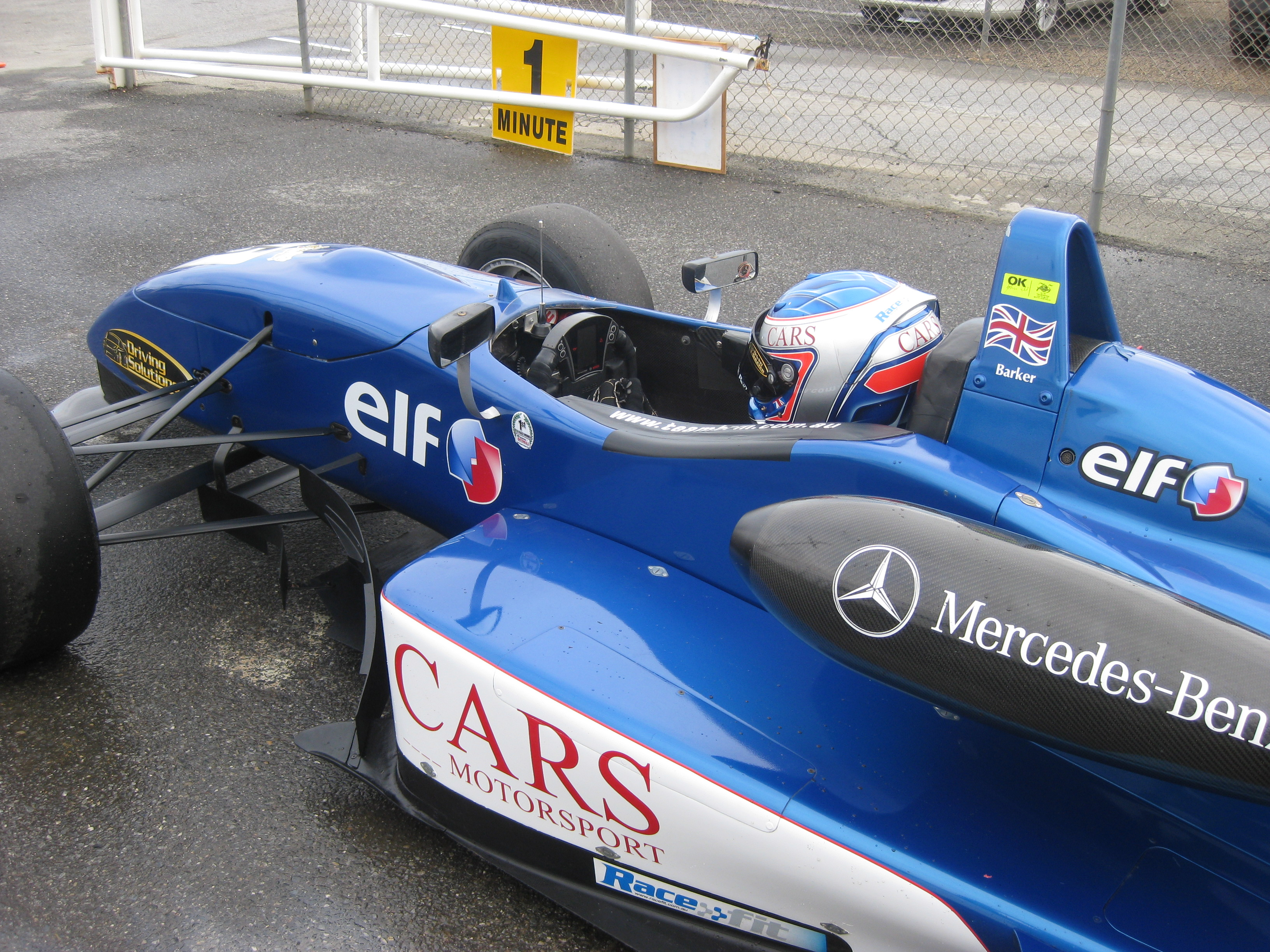
Englishman Ben Barker (Dallara F307), winner of the 2010 Australian Drivers' Championship.

Formula 5000 continued until 1981, with fields shrunk to less than ten cars at some venues, a local variant of Formula Atlantic already in use since the late 70s, was adopted and proved immediately successful with large numbers of Ralt RT4s imported. But Pacific, or Formula Mondial as it was later re-badged, faded by 1987 and the local Australian Formula 2 category was adopted for a single race in 1987 and for the 1988 season, while a Formula 3000 based formula, later titled Formula Holden was developed. Formula Holden ran from 1989 to 2003 by which stage this formulae had become unviable, the international death of Formula 3000 causing a supply of chassis to dry up. In 2005 international Formula 3 regulations were adopted.

Dwindling grid numbers in Australian Formula 3 saw CAMS elect not to award the Gold Star in 2015 for the first time in its history. This decision was made after the season had begun.

In 2020 it was decided to revive the Gold Star for the S5000 Australian Drivers' Championship series of V8 open wheelers. The COVID-19 pandemic prevented a championship from being contested in 2020 delaying the title being awarded until May 2021. S5000 racing was placed on indefinite hiatus starting in 2024.

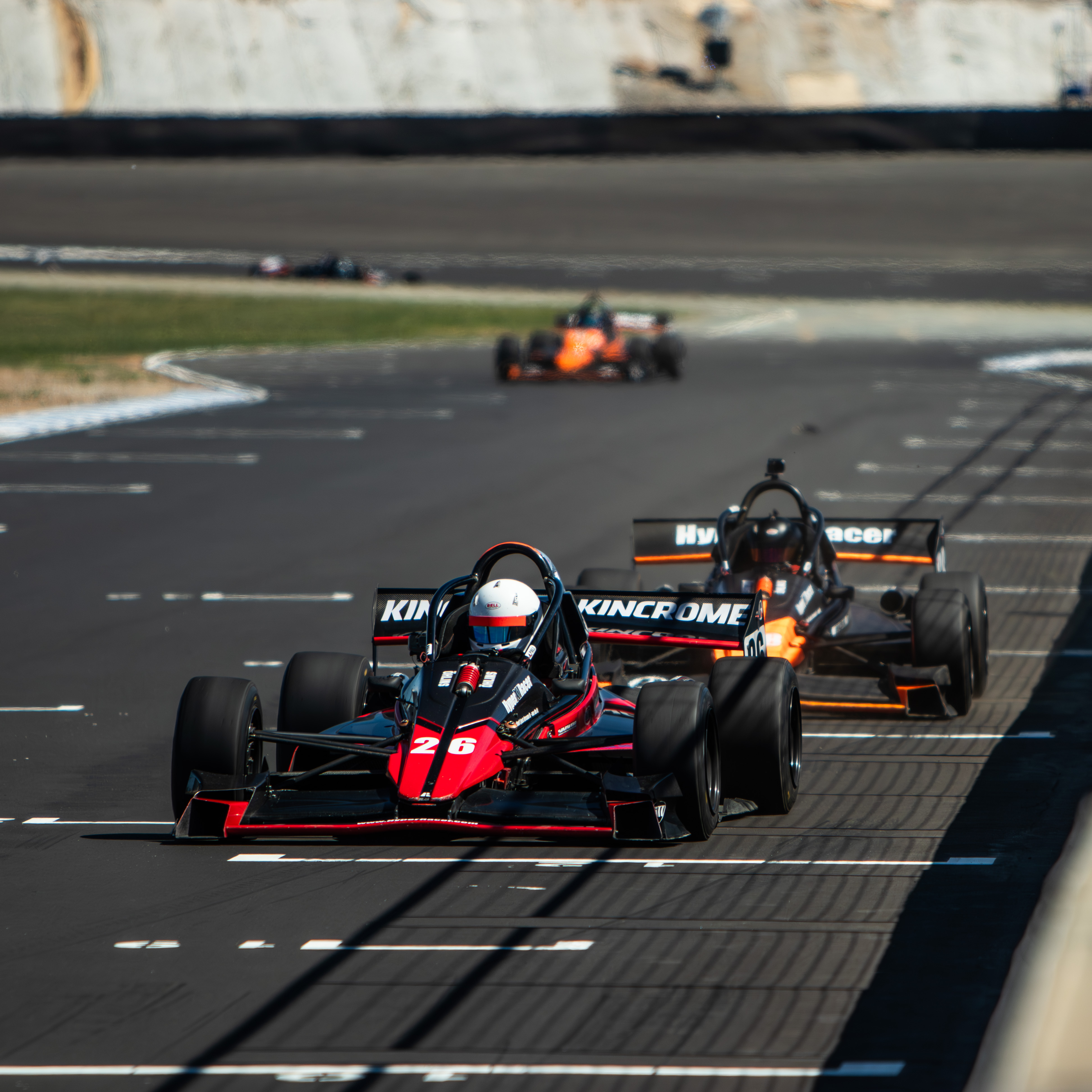
Damon Sterling, 2024 and 2025 ADC Champion, leads at One Raceway

In 2024, the Australian Drivers' Championship was sanctioned by the Australian Auto Sport Alliance, with drivers using the Hyper Racer X1.

== Champions ==
Season	Champion	Car	Formula
1957 – 2023	CAMS Sanctioned		
1957	Lex Davison	Ferrari 500	Formula Libre
1958	Stan Jones	Maserati 250F	Formula Libre
1959	Len Lukey	Cooper T45 Coventry Climax FPF	Formula Libre
1960	Alec Mildren	Cooper T51 Maserati	Formula Libre
1961	Bill Patterson	Cooper T51 Coventry Climax FPF	Formula Libre
1962	Bib Stillwell	Cooper T55 Coventry Climax FPF	Formula Libre
1963	Bib Stillwell	Brabham BT4 Coventry Climax FPF	Formula Libre
1964	Bib Stillwell	Brabham BT4 Coventry Climax FPF	Australian National Formula & Australian 1½ Litre Formula
1965	Bib Stillwell	Brabham BT11A Coventry Climax FPF	Australian National Formula & Australian 1½ Litre Formula
1966	Spencer Martin	Brabham BT11A Coventry Climax FPF	Australian National Formula & Australian 1½ Litre Formula
1967	Spencer Martin	Brabham BT11A Coventry Climax FPF	Australian National Formula & Australian 1½ Litre Formula
1968	Kevin Bartlett	Brabham BT23D Alfa Romeo	Australian National Formula & Australian 1½ Litre Formula
1969	Kevin Bartlett	Mildren Mono Alfa Romeo; Mildren Mono Waggott	Australian National Formula & Australian Formula 2
1970	Leo Geoghegan	Lotus 59B Waggott	Australian Formula 1 & Australian Formula 2
1971	Max Stewart	Mildren Waggott	Australian Formula 1 & Australian Formula 2
1972	Frank Matich	Matich A50 Repco Holden	Australian Formula 1 & Australian Formula 2
1973	John McCormack	Elfin MR5 Repco-Holden	Australian Formula 1 & Australian Formula 2
1974	Max Stewart	Lola T330 Chevrolet	Australian Formula 1 & Australian Formula 2
1975	John McCormack	Elfin MR6 Repco Holden	Australian Formula 1 & Australian Formula 2
1976	John Leffler	Lola T400 Chevrolet	Australian Formula 1 & Australian Formula 2
1977	John McCormack	McLaren M23 Repco-Leyland	Australian Formula 1 & Australian Formula 2
1978	Graham McRae	McRae GM3 Chevrolet	Australian Formula 1
1979	Johnnie Walker	Lola T332 Chevrolet	Australian Formula 1
1980	Alfredo Costanzo	Lola T430 Chevrolet	Australian Formula 1
1981	Alfredo Costanzo	McLaren M26 Chevrolet	Australian Formula 1
1982	Alfredo Costanzo	Tiga FA81 Ford	Australian Formula 1
1983	Alfredo Costanzo	Tiga FA81 Ford	Australian Formula 1
1984	John Bowe	Ralt RT4 Ford	Formula Mondial
1985	John Bowe	Ralt RT4 Ford	Formula Mondial
1986	Graham Watson	Ralt RT4 Ford	Formula Mondial
1987	David Brabham	Ralt RT30 Judd-Volkswagen	Australian Formula 2
1988	Rohan Onslow	Cheetah Mk8 Judd-Volkswagen; Ralt RT30/85 Judd-Volkswagen	Australian Formula 2
1989	Rohan Onslow	Ralt RT20 Holden	Formula Holden
1990	Simon Kane	Ralt RT21 Holden	Formula Holden
1991	Mark Skaife	SPA 003 Holden	Formula Brabham
1992	Mark Skaife	SPA 003 Holden	Formula Brabham
1993	Mark Skaife	Lola T91/50 Holden	Formula Brabham
1994	Paul Stokell	Reynard 91D Holden	Formula Brabham
1995	Paul Stokell	Reynard 91D Holden	Formula Brabham
1996	Paul Stokell	Reynard 91D Holden	Formula Holden
1997	Jason Bright	Reynard 91D Holden	Formula Holden
1998	Scott Dixon	Reynard 92D Holden	Formula Holden
1999	Simon Wills	Reynard 94D Holden	Formula Holden
2000	Simon Wills	Reynard 94D Holden	Formula Holden
2001	Rick Kelly	Reynard 94D Holden	Formula Holden
2002	Will Power	Reynard 94D Holden	Formula Holden
2003	Daniel Gaunt	Reynard 96D Holden	Formula 4000
2004	Neil McFayden	Reynard 96D Holden	Formula 4000
2005	Aaron Caratti	Dallara F304 Sodemo-Renault	Formula 3
2006	Ben Clucas	Dallara F304 Spiess Opel	Formula 3
2007	Tim Macrow	Dallara F304 Spiess Opel	Formula 3
2008	James Winslow	Dallara F307 HWA Mercedes-Benz	Formula 3
2009	Joey Foster	Dallara F307 HWA Mercedes-Benz	Formula 3
2010	Ben Barker	Dallara F307 HWA Mercedes-Benz	Formula 3
2011	Chris Gilmour	Dallara F307 HWA Mercedes-Benz	Formula 3
2012	James Winslow	Dallara F307 HWA Mercedes-Benz	Formula 3
2013	Tim Macrow	Dallara F307 HWA Mercedes-Benz	Formula 3
2014	Simon Hodge	Mygale M11 HWA Mercedes-Benz	Formula 3
2015 – 2020	Not held		
2021	Joey Mawson	Rogers AF01/V8 Ford	S5000 (spec series)
2022	Joey Mawson	Rogers AF01/V8 Ford	S5000 (spec series)
2023	Aaron Cameron	Rogers AF01/V8 Ford	S5000 (spec series)
2024 –	AASA Sanctioned		
2024	Damon Sterling	Hyper Racer X1	Hyper Racer X1 (spec series)
2025	Damon Sterling	Hyper Racer X1	Hyper Racer X1 (spec series)
