= Formula Holden =

Former Single-Seater Racing Championship

Motor racing formula
- Category: Open wheel car
- Country or region: Australia; New Zealand; South-east Asia
- Championships: Australian Drivers' Championship
- Inaugural season: 1989
- Status: Defunct
- Folded: 2007

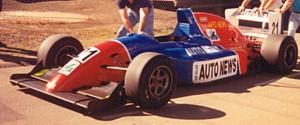
Greg Murphy's Ralt RT23 Formula Holden

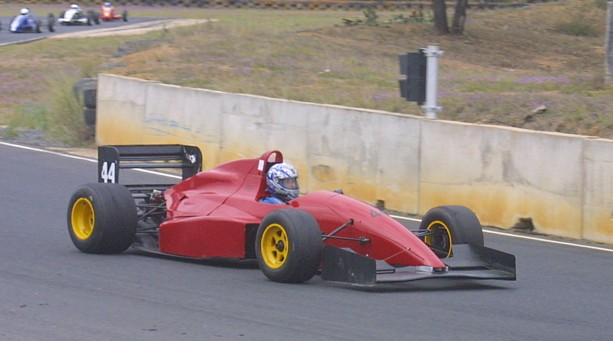
Reynard 92D

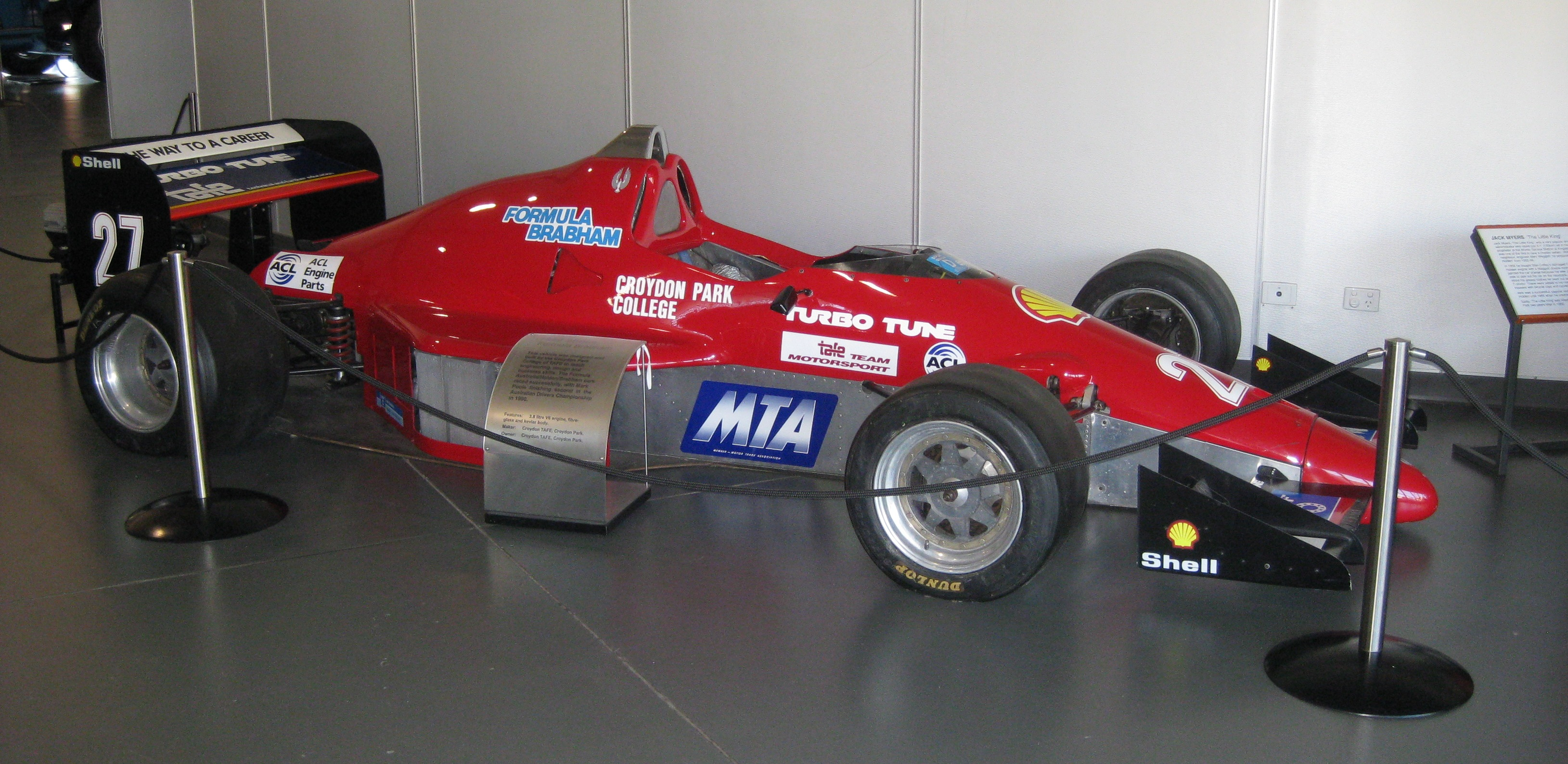
The Shrike NB89H designed by Adelaide TAFE students

Formula Holden was an Australian open wheel racing category introduced in 1989.

== History ==
Known during its development as Formula Australia, it was initially for chassis constructed from aluminium only, running a 3.8-litre Buick V6 engine as it was then utilised in the new versions of the Holden Commodore (VN). Many of the engines used in the category were built by Perkins Engineering, who normally built Group A Holden Commodores and V8 race engines for privateer touring car teams, as well as company owner, multiple Bathurst 1000 winner and ex-Formula One driver Larry Perkins. Early in 1990, Perkins was reported as saying that his Formula Holden engines were putting out approximately 320 bhp (239 kW; 324 PS). To make the V6 engines suitable for racing (in the Commodore road cars the engines developed 221 bhp (165 kW; 224 PS)), a number of specialised parts were supplied by original series sponsor Automotive Components Limited (ACL) who were a subsidiary of Repco.

Second-hand Formula 3000 chassis were targeted immediately as a cheap source of cars in addition to local constructors, and under CAMS rules, all cars had to be at least one year old and had to be aluminium in construction. The category also used a Dunlop control tyre in its early years. From the 1992 season, cars constructed from carbon fibre were allowed. In 2006 an engine upgrade was made available to the 3.6-litre Alloytec V6 engine, although take-up of the Alloytec V6 was far from universal. The engines were usually mounted in ex-Formula 3000 chassis, a large number of which were sourced from the Formula Nippon championship in Japan, but also included cars from other sources (Europe and the UK) and a few specifically designed for the class, like the Australian designed Cheetah, Elfin, Liston cars, as well as the Shrike's which were designed and built by technical students at the Croydon Park Institute of TAFE in Adelaide. Irish Formula One and F3000 designer Gary Anderson also designed the Spa cars specifically for the Formula Holden category.

Formula Holden was in essence a budget form of Formula 3000, the main difference being the engines. As detailed, Formula Holden ran the 3.8 Litre Holden V6 engines. Formula 3000, as its name suggests, ran 3.0 Litre V8 engines including the Cosworth DFV and later the popular Mugen-Honda which were capable of producing over 500 bhp (373 kW; 507 PS). As a guide to the speed difference between the two categories, television commentator and Formula Holden race driver Neil Crompton tested a Mugen powered Dome Japanese F3000 car at the Phillip Island Circuit in early 1990. The Dome (driven by regular drivers Ross Cheever and Thomas Danielsson) lapped the 4.445 km (2.762 mi) circuit in approximately 1:18 while two months later for the opening round of the 1990 Australian Drivers' Championship, the fastest Formula Holden qualifier was the Ralt RT21 of Simon Kane who qualified in 1:26.97. The upgraded Holden V6 engines reportedly had similar torque figures to the F3000 V8's, though they had around 180 bhp (134 kW; 182 PS) less than the V8's which saw the Australian cars have much less top speed.

From its inception in 1989 until 2004 the formula was used to determine the winner of the Australian Drivers' Championship for the CAMS Gold Star, replacing Formula 2 which had been the Gold Star category in 1987 and 1988. From 2005 this title was moved to the Australian Formula 3 Championship.

The first ever Formula Holden race was held at the Mallala Motor Sport Park in South Australia. Mark McLaughlin driving an Elfin FA891, designed and built at the Elfin factory in nearby Adelaide, won the opening race from former dual Australian Formula 2 champion Peter Glover in an Australian designed Cheetah Mk.9 with television commentator turned race driver Neil Crompton third in his Ralt RT21. During the race, television broadcaster Channel 7 claimed that a Formula Holden engine would cost approximately A$9,700 compared to upwards of $25,000 for an engine (usually the Ford badged Cosworth BDA) of the superseded open wheel category, Formula Mondial.

From 1991 to 1995 the category was officially known as Formula Brabham in honour of Australia's first ever Formula One World Champion Sir Jack Brabham, the only person in history to win the World Championship in a car of his own design in 1966. Sir Jack acted as the category patron for five seasons. In 1996 the name reverted to Formula Holden and from the 2003 season the category was officially called "Formula 4000 powered by Holden".

The formula was also used for a 1993 Pan-Pacific series, several New Zealand Grands Prix, and Tasman Cup (Australia versus New Zealand) summer series. It was also proposed to be used for an Asian series based in China. With numbers dropping, largely thanks to the rise of V8 Supercars which all but monopolised big dollar sponsors and television coverage, and the increasing prominence of Formula 3, the class was dropped by the CAMS sanctioning body after the 2005 season. In 2006, the category was run as part of the Australian Motor Racing Series under the sanctioning of the Australian Auto Sport Alliance (AASA) and at times the regular Formula 4000 field was complemented by vehicles competing in the new Oz BOSS category for open wheel racing cars. In 2007 numbers had dropped to the point they could no longer form races by themselves and were amalgamated into the OzBOSS category. As part of this amalgamation, the cars themselves were re-badged again as Formula 3000V6.

The drivers in the series in the 2000s were a mix of older drivers who owned their own cars, or very young Oceanic or South Asian drivers looking to make a name for themselves on the international scene. Although technically using cars just a step below Formula One, the lack of competition in the series means that drivers tended to progress from Formula 4000 to a minor series in Europe (Will Power - British Formula 3) or North America (Scott Dixon - Indy Lights). Alternatively drivers moved to any of the Australian sedan based championships such as Supercars or Australian GT.

From 1 January 2012, Formula Holden cars with a competition history established prior to 31 December 1991 are eligible to compete in Group R "Historic Racing & Sports Racing Cars (post-1977)". However, cars constructed with a full carbon tub are specifically excluded from this Group.

== Champions ==
Championship	Category Name	Champion	Vehicle
1989 Australian Drivers' Championship	Formula Holden	(Australia) Rohan Onslow	Ralt RT20
1990 Australian Drivers' Championship	Formula Holden	(Australia) Simon Kane	Ralt RT21
1991 Australian Drivers' Championship	Formula Brabham	(Australia) Mark Skaife	Spa FB003
1992 Australian Drivers' Championship	Formula Brabham	(Australia) Mark Skaife	Spa FB003
1993 Australian Drivers' Championship	Formula Brabham	(Australia) Mark Skaife	Lola T91/50
1994 Australian Drivers' Championship	Formula Brabham	(Australia) Paul Stokell	Reynard 91D
1995 Australian Drivers' Championship	Formula Brabham	(Australia) Paul Stokell	Reynard 91D
1996 Australian Drivers' Championship	Formula Holden	(Australia) Paul Stokell	Reynard 91D
1997 Australian Drivers' Championship	Formula Holden	(Australia) Jason Bright	Reynard 91D
1998 Australian Drivers' Championship	Formula Holden	(New Zealand) Scott Dixon	Reynard 92D
1999 Australian Drivers' Championship	Formula Holden	(New Zealand) Simon Wills	Reynard 94D
2000 Australian Drivers' Championship	Formula Holden	(New Zealand) Simon Wills	Reynard 94D
2001 Australian Drivers' Championship	Formula Holden	(Australia) Rick Kelly	Reynard 94D
2002 Australian Drivers' Championship	Formula Holden	(Australia) Will Power	Reynard 94D
2003 Australian Drivers' Championship	Formula 4000	(New Zealand) Daniel Gaunt	Reynard 96D
2004 Australian Drivers' Championship	Formula 4000	(Australia) Neil McFadyen	Reynard 95D
2005 Australian Formula 4000 Championship (CAMS)	Formula 4000	(Australia) Peter Hackett	Reynard 96D
2006 Australian Formula 4000 Championship (AMRS)	Formula 4000	(Australia) Derek Pingel	Reynard 95D
2007 OzBoss Championship (AMRS)	OzBoss Championships, F3000V6 class	(Australia) Ty Hanger	Reynard 95D

== Cars used in Formula Holden ==
Cheetah Mk.9, Dome F102, Elfin FA891, Hocking 901, Hocking 911, Liston BF3, Lola T87/50, Lola T91/50, Lola T93/50, March 87B, Ralt RT4, Ralt RT20, Ralt RT21, Ralt RT23, Reynard 89D, Reynard 90D, Reynard 91D, Reynard 92D, Reynard 93D, Reynard 94D, Reynard 95D, Reynard 96D, Reynard 97D, Reynard 98D, Shrike NB89H, SPA 001, SPA 002, SPA 003.

== Lap Records ==
Despite Formula Holden not being raced competitively in Australia since 2007, the class still holds the outright lap records at a number of Australian and New Zealand race circuits. As of May 2024 the list is:

=== Australia ===
- Canberra Street Circuit* - 1:39.5409 - Simon Wills, Reynard 94D, 10 June 2000
- Hidden Valley Raceway - 1:02.9268 - Simon Wills, Reynard 94D, 13 May 2001
- Lakeside International Raceway - 0:46.66, Paul Stokell, Reynard 91D, 17 July 1994
- Mallala Motor Sport Park - 1:02.57 - Paul Stokell, Reynard 90D, 7 August 1994
- Oran Park Raceway (GP)* - 1:01.6718 - Tim Leahey, Reynard 92D, 30 July 2000
- Oran Park Raceway (South)* - 0:37.73 - Paul Stokell, Reynard 90D, 28 August 1994
- Queensland Raceway - 1:04.0661 - Simon Wills, Reynard 94D, 11 July 1999
- Winton Motor Raceway (Club) - 0:52.99 - Mark Larkham, Reynard 90D, 4 April 1992

* Circuit closed

=== New Zealand ===
- Manfeild Autocourse (short) - 1:01.457 - Simon Wills, Reynard 94D, 26 November 2000
- Ruapana Park - 1.15.81 Scott Dixon Reynard 92D, 1998
- Teretonga Park - 0:51.206 - Greg Murphy, Reynard 92D, 1998
- Timaru International Motor Raceway - 0:56.26 Greg Murphy, Reynard 92D, 1995
