= Gary Anderson (motorsport) =

Northern Irish engineer and car designer (born 1951)

- Born: 9 March 1951 (age 75); Coleraine, Northern Ireland

Gary Anderson (born 9 March 1951) is a Northern Irish semi-retired racing car designer and motorsport pundit/commentator.

== Biography ==
=== Early career ===
Born in Northern Ireland, Anderson moved to England in 1972 with the dream of becoming a racing driver but instead found work as a mechanic at Motor Racing Stables at Brands Hatch. Some time later, he found a job at Brabham, helping to build their Formula 3 cars. He then began to work with the Brabham Formula 1 team and quickly progressed to become their chief mechanic. It was during his time at Brabham that he met his future wife, who sent a letter to Bernie Ecclestone on Gary's behalf seeking a job as a mechanic on the Brabham F3 team for him.

In 1975, Gary and a mechanic called Bob Simpson, who worked for Tyrrell Racing, built a Formula 3 car called the Anson SA1. It was based on the Brabham BT38 and was raced by Anderson in Formula Libre. Anderson left Brabham at the end of 1976 to focus on designing the Anson SA2 Formula 3 car for 1977. Last minute withdrawal of sponsorship left the project in great difficulties and part-way through 1977, the car was withdrawn.

Anderson rejoined F1 as chief mechanic at McLaren. He remained there for two years after which he joined the Ensign team. Soon after, Anderson and Simpson relaunched the Anson project, building very competitive Formula 3 and SuperVee cars. In 1985, Anderson went to America to become the chief engineer of the Galles Indycar team. It was here that he first teamed-up with driver Roberto Moreno. The pair would go on to have great success in Formula 3000; Anderson became technical director of Bromley Motorsport with Roberto Moreno as a driver and Moreno won the 1988 International Formula 3000 title for the team, using the Reynard 88D F3000 chassis. Adrian Reynard hired Anderson to design the 1989 and 1990 Reynard F3000 chassis.

At the same time he also designed the Spa series of open wheelers for the Formula 3000 based Formula Holden. Driving for Gibson Motorsport, Mark Skaife finished third in a Spa FB001 in the 1990 Australian Drivers' Championship, before winning the championship in a Spa FB003 in 1991 and 1992.

=== Jordan (1991–1998) ===
In 1990, Eddie Jordan asked Anderson to design the very first Jordan Grand Prix car for the 1991 Formula One season. The Jordan Ford 191 was designed by Anderson and entered for the 1991 season. It achieved points finishes on seven occasions throughout the year, finishing the season 5th in the Constructors' Championship table. Anderson was made technical director of the team for 1992 onwards. The team scored its first podium position in the 1994 Pacific Grand Prix, with Rubens Barrichello driving the Anderson-designed Jordan Hart 194 (co-designed by Andrew Green). Anderson would remain with Jordan, despite offers from McLaren and Ferrari, until midway through the 1998 season when he was replaced by Mike Gascoyne.

=== Stewart, Jaguar and Reynard (1999–2001) ===
Following his departure from the Jordan team, Anderson joined the Stewart Grand Prix team, designing the Stewart Ford SF3 for the 1999 Formula One season. This season would be the most successful season for Stewart Grand Prix, achieving four podium finishes, including a win at the 1999 European Grand Prix. The team secured 4th in the Constructors' Championship for that season. Anderson said of team owner Jackie Stewart that he was "the best person I've ever worked for in my life". After Ford bought the Stewart team and renamed it Jaguar Racing for the 2000 season, Anderson remained to design their 2000 Formula One car. The Jaguar Cosworth R1 scored two points finishes in the 2000 Formula One season, ending the season 9th in the Constructors' Championship. Anderson was then replaced at Jaguar and spent 2001 in America working for Reynard in CART.

=== Return to Jordan (2002–2003) ===
Anderson reunited with the Jordan Grand Prix team in 2002. He co-designed the 2002 Jordan Honda EJ12 (with Eghbal Hamidy), which managed five points finishes, finishing the season 6th in the Constructors' Championship. Jordan lost backing of the Honda engines for 2003, and the Anderson-designed EJ13, now powered by Cosworth (badged as Ford) engines, finished the 2003 season 9th in the Constructors' Championship, but won a race (the 2003 Brazilian Grand Prix).

=== Later work ===
Since leaving Jordan in 2003, Anderson has worked for several television broadcasters: firstly for RTÉ from 2003-2005 followed by Setanta Ireland's coverage from 2006-2009 and ESPN Star Sports as a technical analyst and commentator. On 12 January 2012, the BBC announced that Anderson had been recruited as technical analyst and pitlane reporter for their coverage of the FIA Formula 1 Championship. In 2013 Anderson remained with the BBC1 BBC2 TV and BBC 5 Live teams as their Technical Analyst. BBC2 now broadcasting all live F1 practice on Friday and Saturday.

In 2014 having left the BBC (who wished to move away from technical reporting) Anderson continued to explain the new breed of F1 cars in Autosport magazine and web page giving the F1 fans an insight into what will be this season, the biggest changes in Formula One Cars for many years using hybrid power which is a combination of fossil fuel power from a 1600cc turbo charged V6 engine and self generated electrical power.

In 2014, Anderson joined the TV production team at Formula One Management (FOM) who produce all track televised F1 pictures, mainly to assist them in explaining the complexities of the new breed of F1 car. FOM will later be launching an F1 App which will use Anderson's technical insight. He commentated on the GP3 series with Will Buxton for Sky Sports in 2014.

Anderson was awarded an honorary doctorate of science by the University of Ulster in 2014. In 2015 he started working with the newly formed company Typhoon, a firm focusing on producing motor-assisted bicycles.

Anderson currently hosts his own podcast for The Race alongside F1 Journalist Edd Straw discussing the technical side of current Formula 1 news and events as well as his personal F1 experience. He also regularly appears on The Race's Bring Back V10s podcast. Since 2022 Anderson has written a technical analysis column for The Telegraph.
