= 1991 Australian Drivers' Championship =

Motor racing competition

Seasons
- ← 1990 1992 →

The 1991 Australian Drivers' Championship was a CAMS sanctioned national motor racing title for drivers of Formula Brabham racing cars. The winner of the championship was awarded the 1991 CAMS Gold Star.

Touring car driver Mark Skaife won his first Australian Drivers' Championship. All seven rounds of the series were held at the new Eastern Creek Raceway in Sydney.

== Calendar ==
The title was contested over a seven-round series:

- Round 1, Eastern Creek Raceway, New South Wales, 26 May
- Round 2, Eastern Creek Raceway, New South Wales, 21 July
- Round 3, Eastern Creek Raceway, New South Wales, 21 July
- Round 4, Eastern Creek Raceway, New South Wales, 25 August
- Round 5, Eastern Creek Raceway, New South Wales, 25 August
- Round 6, Eastern Creek Raceway, New South Wales, 29 September
- Round 7, Eastern Creek Raceway, New South Wales, 29 September

Championship points were awarded on a 20–15–12–10–8–6–4–3–2–1 basis to the top ten finishers in each round. Australian Formula 2 cars were invited to compete in Rounds 4, 5, 6 & 7 however only the ten best placed Formula Brabham drivers were eligible to score points. The best six performances from the seven rounds were counted towards a driver's points total.

== Results ==
Position	Driver	No	Car	Entrant	Rd 1	Rd 2	Rd 3	Rd 4	Rd 5	Rd 6	Rd 7	Total
1	Mark Skaife	3	Spa FB003 Holden	Skaife Racing	(15)	20	20	20	20	20	20	120 (135)
2	Mark McLaughlin	11	Spa FB002 Holden	Thalgo Cosmetics	12	15	12	12	-	10	10	71
3	Mark Larkham	10	Ralt RT20 Holden	Peter Boylan Racing	20	6	4	15	-	12	12	69
4	Paul Morris	27	Shrike NB89H Holden	Eastern Creek Raceway	8	12	15	8	15	8	(8)	66 (74)
5	Simon Kane	1	Ralt RT21 Holden	Simon Kane	-	-	-	-	-	15	15	30
6	Mark Poole	2	Shrike NB89H Holden	TAFE Team Motorsport	10	8	10	-	-	-	-	28
7	Warwick Rooklyn	28	Shrike NB89H Holden	Eastern Creek Raceway	4	-	8	10	-	-	-	22
8	Rohan Onslow	5	Ralt RT21 Holden	David Mawer	3	10	6	-	-	-	-	19
9	John Briggs	9	Ralt RT21 Holden	John Briggs	6	-	-	-	12	-	-	18
10	Tony Blanche	12; 11	Ralt RT21 Holden; SPA 002 Holden	Thalgo Cosmetics	-	-	-	6	10	-	-	16
11	Brian Sampson	78	Cheetah Mk9 Holden; Ralt RT20 Holden	Speco Thomas / Motor Improvements	2	4	3	-	-	3	3	15
12	Chris Hocking	74	Hocking 911 Holden	Chris Hocking	-	-	-	4	8	-	-	12
12	Ron Searle	28	Shrike NB89H Holden	Eastern Creek Raceway	-	-	-	-	-	6	6	12
14	Keith Carling	5	Ralt RT21 Holden	David Mawer	-	-	-	-	-	4	4	8
15	Bryan Sala	50	Hocking 901 Holden	Bryan Sala	-	-	2	-	-	-	-	2
16	John Hermann	8	Herco Ralt-Holden	John Hermann	1	-	-	-	-	-	-	1

== Bibliography ==
- Australian Motor Racing Year, 1991/92
- CAMS Manual of Motor Sport, 1991
- www.formulaholden.com (retrieved December 2001)
- Official Programme, Foster's Australian Grand Prix, 31 Oct – 3 Nov 1991
- www.camsmanual.com.au
