= Buick V6 engine =

Buick V6
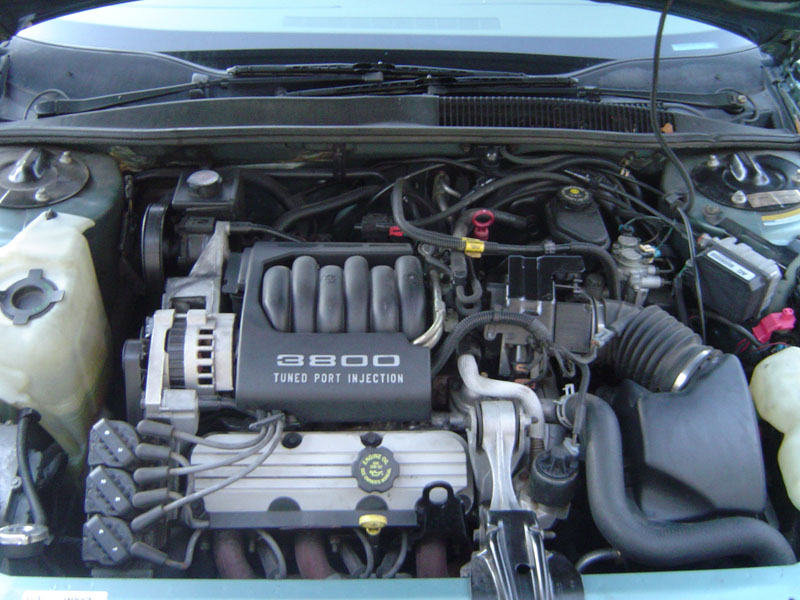
- 3800 V6 Series I (L27) Engine in a 1995 Buick Regal

Overview
- Manufacturer: General Motors; Kaiser Jeep; American Motors
- Also called: Fireball; Dauntless; 3800
- Production: 1961–2008

Layout
- Configuration: 90° V6
- Displacement: 181.0 cu in (3.0 L; 2,966 cc); 196.3 cu in (3.2 L; 3,216 cc); 197.4 cu in (3.2 L; 3,234 cc); 203.9 cu in (3.3 L; 3,341 cc); 225.3 cu in (3.7 L; 3,692 cc); 231.4 cu in (3.8 L; 3,791 cc); 251.9 cu in (4.1 L; 4,128 cc)
- Cylinder bore: 3.5 in (88.9 mm); 3.625 in (92.1 mm); 3.7 in (94 mm); 3.75 in (95.25 mm); 3.8 in (96.5 mm); 3.965 in (100.7 mm)
- Piston stroke: 2.66 in (67.6 mm); 3.16 in (80.3 mm); 3.1875 in (80.96 mm); 3.4 in (86.4 mm)
- Cylinder block material: Cast iron
- Cylinder head material: Cast iron
- Valvetrain: OHV 2 valves × cyl.
- Compression ratio: 8.0:1, 8.4:1, 8.5:1, 9.0:1, 9.4:1

Combustion
- Supercharger: Eaton M62 or M90 (some versions)
- Turbocharger: In LD5 and special racing editions
- Fuel system: Rochester carburetor Multi-port fuel injection Sequential fuel injection
- Fuel type: Gasoline
- Oil system: Wet sump
- Cooling system: Water-cooled

Output
- Power output: 90 to 300 hp (67 to 224 kW)
- Torque output: 145 to 280 lb⋅ft (197 to 380 N⋅m)

Dimensions
- Dry weight: 392 lb (178 kg) (Series II)

Chronology
- Successor: GM High Value V6 (Naturally Aspirated Applications); GM High Feature V6 (Supercharged Applications)

The Buick V6 is an OHV V6 engine developed by the Buick division of General Motors and first introduced in the 1962 model year. The engine was originally 198 cu in (3.2 L) and was marketed as the Fireball engine. GM continued to develop and refine the 231 cu in (3.8 L) V6, eventually and commonly referred to simply as the 3800, through numerous iterations.

The 3800 made the Ward's 10 Best Engines of the 20th Century list and made Ward's yearly 10 Best list numerous times. It is one of the most-manufactured engines in automotive history, with over 25 million produced.

The engine originally derived from Buick's 215 cu in (3.5 L) aluminium V8 family, which also went on to become the Rover V8, manufactured from 1960–2006.

== Overview ==
The 3800's block is cast iron and all variants use iron, two-valve-per-cylinder OHV heads. The engine, originally designed and manufactured in the United States, was also produced in later versions in Australia. It was the first six-cylinder engine designed exclusively for Buick products since the Buick straight-six was discontinued in 1930.

In 1967, GM sold the design to Kaiser-Jeep since they no longer felt the need to produce a V6, considered an unusual engine configuration in North America at the time. The 1973 oil crisis prompted the company to re-acquire the design from American Motors (AMC), who had purchased Kaiser-Jeep in 1970, in early 1974. The descendants of the early 231 continue as the most-common GM V6, as it developed into a very durable and reliable design.

Though the pre-3800 rear-wheel drive (RWD) V6 uses the Buick, Oldsmobile, Pontiac (BOP) bellhousing pattern, an oddity of both the front-wheel drive (FWD) and RWD 3800 V6 is that although it is a 90° V6, it uses the GM 60° V6 bell housing (Metric Pattern). For use in the FWD applications, the bellhousings on the FWD transmissions are altered slightly.

This engine has the cylinders numbered 1-3-5 on the left-hand bank (front bank for FWD applications) and 2-4-6 on the right-hand bank, the number 1 cylinder being the furthest from the flywheel end. The firing order is 1-6-5-4-3-2.

The engine was produced at the Flint North plant in Flint, Michigan, with engine blocks and cylinder heads cast at the Grey Iron plant (now the GM Saginaw Metal Casting Operations plant) at 1629 N. Washington Avenue in Saginaw, Michigan.

== Early versions ==
=== Fireball V6 ===
The first engine in this family, RPO code 6I, was introduced in 1961 for the 1962 model year Buick Special with Buick's 198 cu in (3.2 L) engine, the first V6 in an American car (the GMC V6 was used earlier in trucks). Because it was derived from Buick's 215 cu in (3.5 L) aluminum V8, it has a 90° bank between cylinders and an uneven firing pattern due to the crankshaft having only three crank pins set at 120° apart, with opposing cylinders (1-2, 3-4, and 5-6) sharing a crank pin in, as do many V8 engines. The uneven firing pattern was often perceived as roughness, leading a former American Motors executive to describe it as "rougher than a cob."

Popular Mechanics described this engine's genesis only months into initial production: "Buick engineers pulled off the quickest tooling job in the history of the U.S. auto industry when they got the new V6 into production within five months of the final decision to build it! The top [Buick] brass in Flint wanted to lower the Special line into the Ford-Chevrolet big six price bracket--and a new cast-iron six-cylinder engine was the only way they could do it. Their answer was to chop the rear pair of cylinders off the aluminum V8 and cast the block and heads in iron. By using the V8 valve gear, die-cast aluminum front cover, accessories, timing chain and sprockets, water pump, oil pump, bearings--and by adapting a lot of the V8 tooling--Buick did the impossible."

The off-center design continued up until the 1988 LN3 version of the engine, when the left-hand bank of cylinders was moved forward relative to the right-hand bank. Although the actual bore spacing between cylinders on the same bank remained unchanged at 4.24 in (108 mm), the LN3 and later engines became known to have "on-center bore spacing".

==== 198 ====
The Buick Division, concerned about high manufacturing costs of their innovative aluminum 215 V8, sought to develop a cheaper, cast-iron engine based on the same tooling. It was given the RPO code JL. They settled on an unusual 90° V6 layout that was essentially the architecture of the '215' less two cylinders. In initial form, it had a bore and stroke of 3.625 in × 3.1875 in (92.08 mm × 80.96 mm), for an overall displacement of 197.4 cu in (3.2 L; 3,234 cc). It weighed about 35 lb (16 kg) more than the aluminum engine, but was less costly to manufacture. Dubbed the Fireball V6, it became the standard engine in the 1962 Buick Special. In their test that year, Road & Track was impressed with Buick's "practical" new V6, saying it "sounds and performs exactly like the aluminum V8 in most respects."

==== 225 ====
The bore was increased to 3.75 in (95.25 mm), and stroke increased to 3.4 in (86.4 mm), increasing displacement to 225.3 cu in (3.7 L; 3,692 cc). The engine was similar to the popular small-block Buick V8—now with a cast-iron block and displacement of 300 cu in (4.9 L), the engine was made at the same factory with much of the same tooling. This engine carried the RPO code KH for the 1964 model year and LH for 1965. In 1966, the code was MH and was renamed the Wildcat V-6. For 1967, the code was NH. This engine was used in Buick's intermediate-sized Special and Skylark models from 1964 to 1967 and Oldsmobile's mid-sized F-85/Cutlass models for 1964 and 1965, including the Oldsmobile Vista Cruiser and Buick Sport Wagon.

1964–1965 models featured a single barrel Rochester MonoJet, producing 155 hp (116 kW). In 1966–1967, the 1-barrel was replaced with a 2-barrel Rochester 2GV, giving the engine a 5-horsepower boost to 160 hp (119 kW).

The V6 was dropped after the 1967 model year in favor of a conventional 250 cu in (4.1 L) inline-six engine built by the Chevrolet division, and the tooling was sold to Kaiser-Jeep.

==== Dauntless ====
In 1965, Kaiser-Jeep began using the Buick 225 in Jeep CJs. It was known as the Dauntless V6 and used a much heavier flywheel than the Buick version to damp the vibrations resulting from the engine's firing pattern. Buick sold the tooling for this engine to Kaiser in 1967, as the demand for the engine was waning steadily in an era of V8s and muscle cars. When American Motors (AMC) bought Jeep, the V6 was replaced with AMC straight-6 engines, but the ownership of the V6 tooling remained with AMC.

Applications:
:
- 1966–1971 Jeep Jeepster & Jeepster Commando
- 1966–1971 CJ-5
- 1966–1971 CJ-6

==== 231 ====
The 1973 oil crisis prompted GM to look for more economical engines than the V8s of 350, 400, and 454/455 cubic inches that powered most General Motors cars and trucks during that time. At that time, the only "small" engines generally offered by GM were built by the Chevrolet division including the 140 cu in (2.3 L) OHC aluminum inline-four engine used in the subcompact Chevrolet Vega and a 250 cu in (4.1 L) straight-6 used in smaller Chevy, Buick, Oldsmobile and Pontiac models, whose design roots dated back to the 1962 Chevy II (Nova). LD5 was the RPO for engines with chassis code "A", LD7 was used for the 1977-only VIN code "C" engines.

One quick idea was tried by Buick engineers: taking an old Fireball V6 picked up at a junkyard and installing it into a 1974 Buick Apollo. The solution worked so well that GM wanted AMC to put the engine back into production. However, AMC's cost per unit was deemed too high. Instead of buying completed engines, GM made an offer to buy back the tooling and manufacturing line from AMC in April 1974, and began building the engines on August 12. With production back within GM, Buick re-introduced the V6 in certain 1975 models that fall— a move made possible by the fact that foundations for the old V6 machinery were still intact at Buick's engine assembly plant in Flint, Michigan, so it was easy to put the old tooling back in place and begin production at least two years ahead of the normal schedule that would have been required to create new tooling. The bore was enlarged to 3.8 in (97 mm), identical to the Buick 350 V8, yielding 231.4 cu in (3.8 L; 3,791 cc) displacement. 78,349 units were installed in Buicks for 1975.

To meet the challenges of the new fuel economy and emissions standards, the engine produced just 105 or 110 hp (78 or 82 kW), depending on fitment and year.

In 1977, Buick redesigned the crankshaft to a "split-pin" configuration to create an "even-firing" version. The crank pins associated with the opposing cylinders were offset from each other by 30°. The relatively small offset did not require flying arms to be incorporated, however a 3 mm (0.12 in) thick flange was built in between the offset crank pins to prevent the connecting rod big-ends from "walking" off the crank pin bearing journal and interfering with the adjacent big end. The 3 mm (0.12 in) thick flange effectively caused the connecting rods on the left-hand bank of cylinders (forward bank for FWD applications) to move 1.5 mm (0.059 in) forward and the right-hand bank to move 1.5 mm (0.059 in) rearward, but the engine block remained unchanged compared to the odd-fire engine. Since the cylinders' center-lines were no longer centralized over the crank pin bearing journals, the connecting rods were re-designed with the big-ends offset from the piston pin ends by 1.5 mm (0.059 in). The engine in this configuration became known to have "off-center bore spacing".

Applications:
- 1975 Buick Apollo
- 1975–1980 Buick Skyhawk
- 1975–1977 Buick Century
- 1975–1977 Buick Regal
- 1975–1976 Buick LeSabre
- 1975–1979 Buick Skylark
- 1975–1982 Oldsmobile Cutlass
- 1978–1981 Chevrolet Camaro
- 1978–1987 Chevrolet El Camino
- 1978–1983 Chevrolet Malibu
- 1978–1987 Chevrolet Monte Carlo
- 1978–1980 Chevrolet Monza
- 1978–1987 Oldsmobile Cutlass Supreme
- 1975–1980 Oldsmobile Starfire
- 1977–1979 Oldsmobile Omega
- 1978–1987 Pontiac Grand Prix
- 1976–1980 Pontiac Sunbird
- 1976–1981 Pontiac Firebird
- 1978–1981 Pontiac LeMans
- 1977–1979 Pontiac Ventura

==== LD5 ====
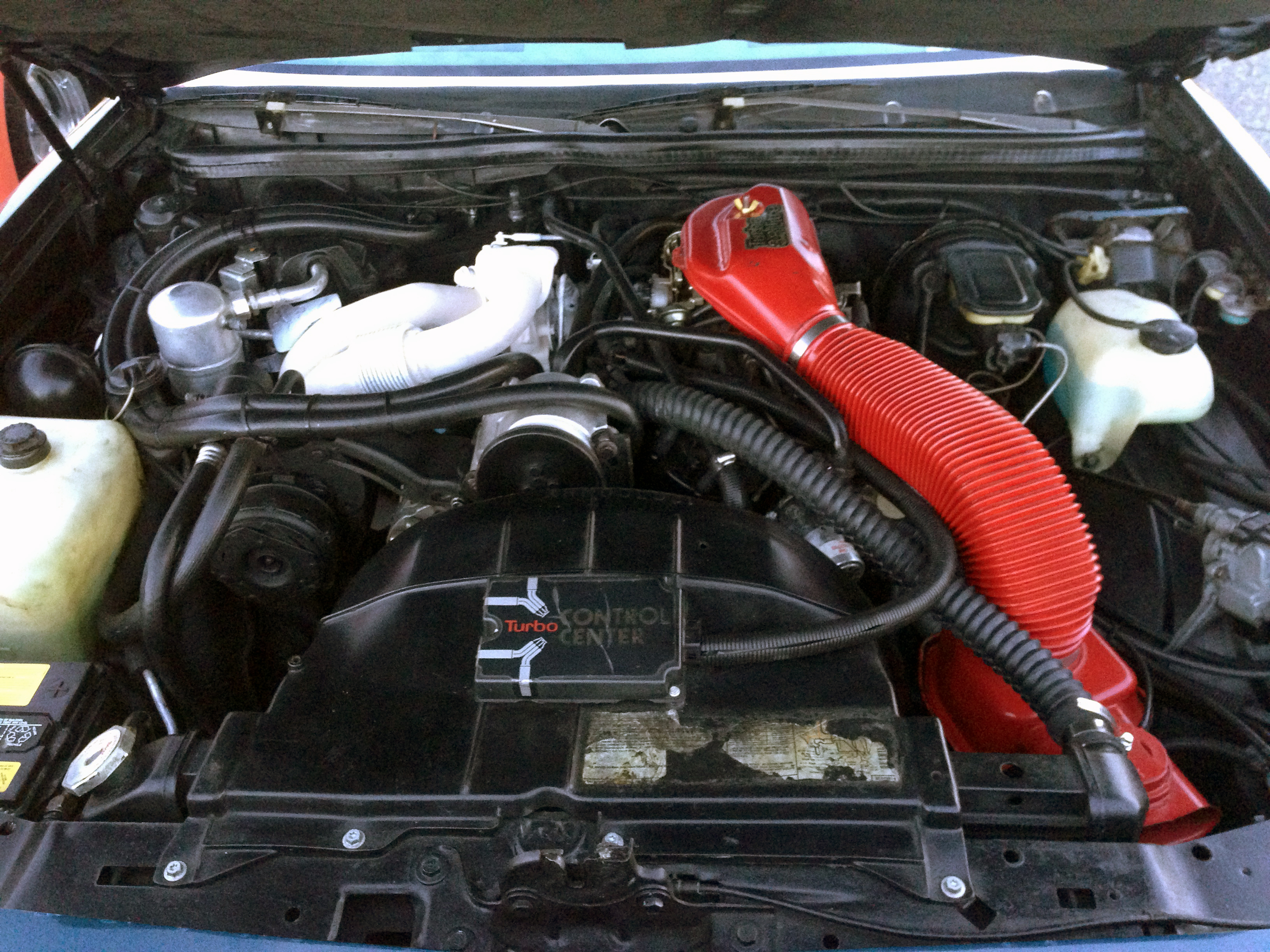
The original, carbureted turbocharged LD5 from a 1978 Regal Sport Coupé

In 1978, GM began to market the 231 as the 3.8 liter as metric engine sizes became common in the United States. The RPO Code was LD5, though California-emissions versions were called LC6. Starting in 1979, the engine was used in the front-wheel drive Buick Riviera, though still with a longitudinal mounting. Larger valves and better intake and exhaust boosted the power output for 1979.

A turbocharged version was introduced as the pace car at the 1976 Indianapolis 500, and a production turbo arrived in 1978. The turbo 3.8 received sequential fuel injection and a wasted spark Distributorless Ignition System in 1984. In 1986, an air-to-air Garrett intercooler was added and the RPO Code became LC2. The LC2 engine has a bore and stroke of 3.8 in × 3.4 in (96.5 mm × 86.4 mm). The horsepower ratings for 1986 & 1987 were 235 and 245 hp (238 and 248 PS; 175 and 183 kW), respectively. The limited production GNX benefitted from additional factory modifications such as a ceramic turbocharger, more efficient Garrett intercooler, low restriction exhaust system and revised programming which resulted in a 300 hp (304 PS; 224 kW) factory rating.

Applications:
- 1978–1987 Buick Regal Sport Coupe, T-Type, Grand National, and GNX
- 1978–1980 Buick LeSabre Sport Coupe
- 1979–1980 Buick Century Turbo Coupe & Sedan
- 1979–1985 Buick Riviera S-Type, T-Type and less than 100 Convertibles
- 1980–1981 Chevrolet Monte Carlo Turbo
- 1989 Pontiac Trans Am Turbo 20th Anniversary Edition

==== LC9 ====
A smaller version of this engine was produced in 1978 and 1979 for the Century, Regal, and Chevrolet Monza. The bore was reduced to 3.5 in (88.9 mm), resulting in an engine of 196.3 cu in (3.2 L; 3,216 cc) piston displacement. The RPO code was LC9. Initially this engine produced 90 hp (67 kW), but in 1979 it received the same improvements in the cylinder heads as did the LD5, and therefore power increased to 105 hp (78 kW).

==== LC4 ====
In response to rising gas prices, a larger 251.9 cu in (4.1 L; 4,128 cc) version of the 3.8 liter LD5 V6 was produced from 1980 through 1984 and marketed as an alternative to a V8. The bore was enlarged to 3.965 in (100.7 mm), yielding an output of 125 hp (93 kW) and 205 lb⋅ft (278 N⋅m). This engine was used in many large rear-wheel drive Buicks, and in some models from each of GM's other divisions, including Cadillac which offered the "big" Buick V6 in several models from 1980 to 1982 as a credit option to the troublesome V8-6-4 engine used in 1981 and early versions of the aluminum-block Cadillac HT-4100 V8 introduced in 1982. It was also the standard powerplant in the front-drive Riviera and Oldsmobile Toronado from 1981 to 1984. Additionally, the 4.1 block was used unsuccessfully at Indianapolis for racing. Its only weakness was the intake valve seals. This was the first naturally aspirated GM V-6 to feature a 4-barrel carburetor.

Year	Horsepower	Torque	Fuel System	Compression Ratio	VIN Code
1980–1984	125 hp (93 kW) at 4,000 rpm	205 lb⋅ft (278 N⋅m) at 2,000 rpm	4-bbl	8.0:1	4

Applications:
- 1980–84 Buick Electra
- 1980–84 Buick LeSabre
- 1982–84 Buick Regal
- 1981–84 Buick Riviera
- 1980–82 Cadillac DeVille
- 1981–82 Cadillac Eldorado
- 1980–82 Cadillac Fleetwood
- 1981–82 Cadillac Seville
- 1981–83 Oldsmobile 98
- 1981–84 Oldsmobile Toronado
- 1982 Pontiac Grand Prix
- 1982 Pontiac Bonneville

==== LK9 ====
A small 181.0 cu in (3.0 L; 2,966 cc) version of the Buick V6 was produced for GM's 1980s front-wheel drive cars. Introduced in 1982, it was a lower deck version of the 3.8 designed for transverse application in the new GM A platform cars such as the Buick Century and Oldsmobile Cutlass Ciera. It shared the same bore size as its larger sibling, but featured a smaller stroke of 2.66 in (68 mm). It used a Rochester E2ME 2-bbl carburetor and the VIN code for the engine is E.

Year	Horsepower	Torque	Compression Ratio
1982–1983	110 hp (82 kW) at 4,800 rpm	145 lb⋅ft (197 N⋅m) at 2,000 rpm	8.45:1
1984–1985	110 hp (82 kW) at 4,800 rpm	145 lb⋅ft (197 N⋅m) at 2,600 rpm	8.4:1

Applications:
- 1982–1985 Buick Century
- 1982–1985 Oldsmobile Cutlass Ciera
- 1985 Oldsmobile 98
- 1985 Buick Electra

==== LN7 ====
The LN7 is a multiport fuel injected version of the LK9. It was introduced for 1985 and used the VIN code: L. It was replaced in 1989 with the 3.3.

Horsepower	Torque	Compression Ratio
125 hp (93 kW) at 4,900 rpm	150 lb⋅ft (203 N⋅m) at 2,400 rpm	9.0:1

Applications:
- 1986 Oldsmobile Delta 88
- 1986 Buick LeSabre
- 1986–1988 Buick Skylark
- 1985–1987 Buick Somerset
- 1985–1987 Pontiac Grand Am
- 1985–1988 Oldsmobile Cutlass Calais

==== 3.8 FWD LG2/LG3 ====
In mid-1984, the 3.8 liter LD5 engine was modified for transverse-mounting in smaller, FWD vehicles, and equipped with multi point fuel injection (MPFI). 1984-1985 models used a distributor and a distributorless wasted spark ignition system was added for all engines produced in 1986 and later. In 1986, it received sequential fuel injection (SFI) and it was initially produced in two forms, the LG2 with flat lifters (tappets), and the LG3 with a roller camshaft and lifters. The latter was offered in various models through 1988. From 1986, the 3.8 had a revised, crankshaft-driven oil pump which eliminated a longstanding problem with pump housing wear and loss of prime. Power produced by this engine was:

- VIN code B (LG2): flat lifters (tappets)
  - 140 hp (104 kW) at 4,400 rpm, 200 lb⋅ft (271 N⋅m) at 2,000 rpm
- VIN code 3 (LG3): roller lifters (tappets)
  - 125 hp (93 kW) at 4,400 rpm, 195 lb⋅ft (264 N⋅m) at 2,000 rpm (1984–1985 MPFI)
  - 150 hp (112 kW) at 4,400 rpm, 200 lb⋅ft (271 N⋅m) at 2,200 rpm (1986–1988 SFI)
Applications:
- 1984–1988 Buick Century
- 1986 Buick Riviera (LG2)
- 1987 Buick Riviera (LG3)
- 1986–1987 Buick LeSabre
- 1985–1987 Buick Electra
- 1984–1988 Oldsmobile Cutlass Ciera
- 1986–1987 Oldsmobile Delta 88
- 1985–1987 Oldsmobile Ninety Eight
- 1986–1987 Oldsmobile Toronado
- 1987–Early 1988 Pontiac Bonneville

== 3800 V6 ==
=== Pre-Series I ===
==== LN3 Naturally Aspirated ====
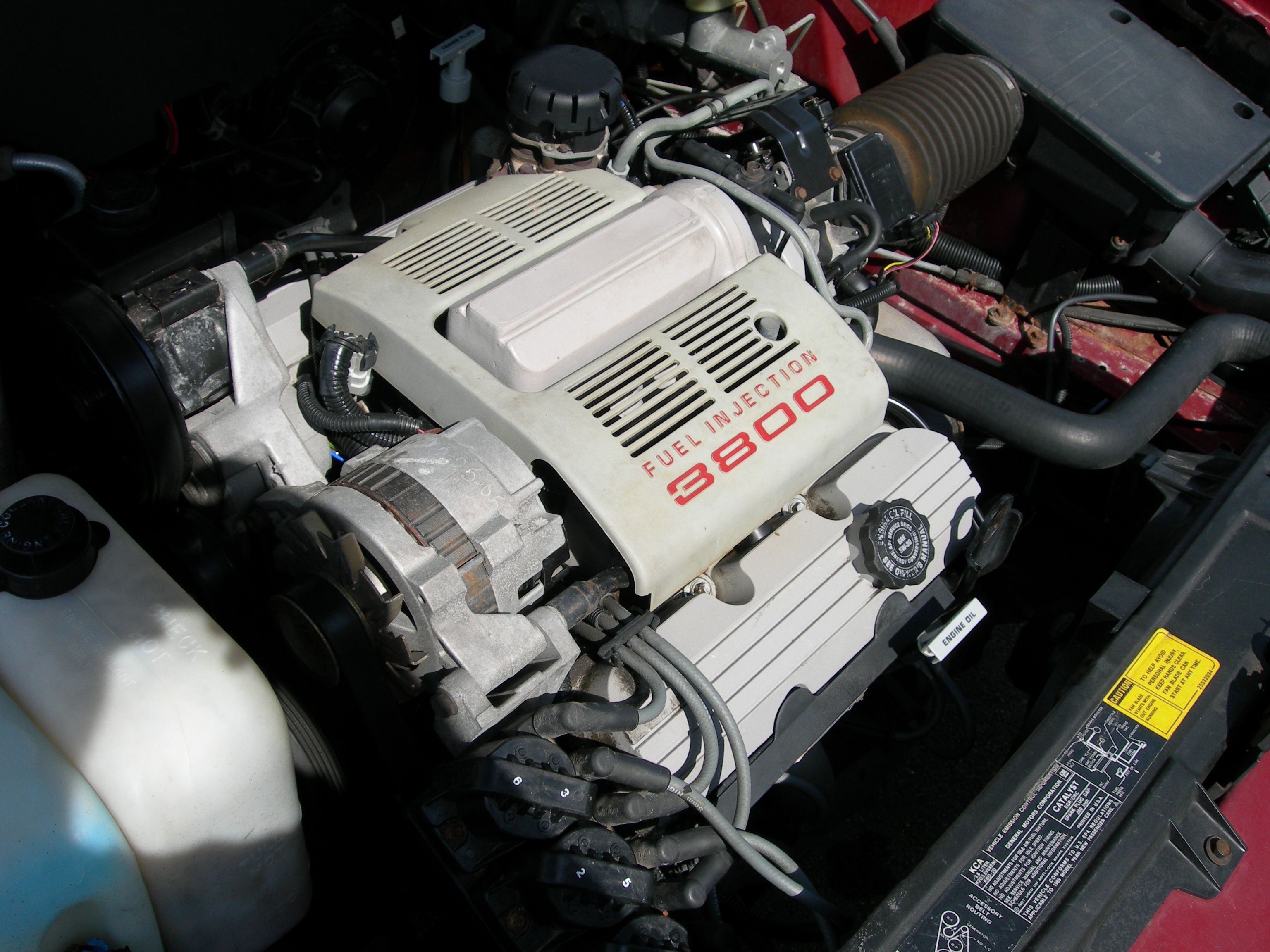
An LN3 installed in a 1989 Pontiac Bonneville with a later ICM and Coilpack upgrade instead of the original Magnavox Ignition System.

Introduced in 1988 and initially designated VIN code C, the 3800 LN3 would later be loosely considered the Pre-Series I, although the older 3.8 SFI (LG3) was still available that year in some models. The LN3 was a major redesign, with a change to on-center bore spacing (created by moving the left-hand bank of cylinders forward relative to the right-hand bank) and the addition of a balance shaft. Other features included a 3×/18× crank-trigger system and multiport fuel injection. This generation continued in use in several GM products into the early 1990s. It produced 165 hp (123 kW) of power and 210 lb⋅ft (285 N⋅m) of torque.

The LN3 is very closely related to the Series I L27 and Series I L67 Supercharged. In fact, supercharger-related hardware can be fitted to an LN3 without changing the cylinder heads. However, the ECM would have to be reprogrammed. The L27 has a two-piece, upper plenum intake and lower intake, the LN3 is all one piece.

Applications:
- 1988–1990 Buick Electra
- 1988–1991 Buick LeSabre
- 1988–1990 Buick Reatta
- 1988–1990 Buick Riviera
- Formula Holden (motor racing category)
- 1988–1991 Holden Commodore (VN Series I)
- 1988.5–1991 Oldsmobile Delta 88
- 1988–1990 Oldsmobile Ninety-Eight
- 1988–1990 Oldsmobile Touring Sedan
- 1988–1990 Oldsmobile Toronado
- 1988–1990 Oldsmobile Toronado Trofeo
- 1988–1991 Pontiac Bonneville

==== 3300 (LG7) ====
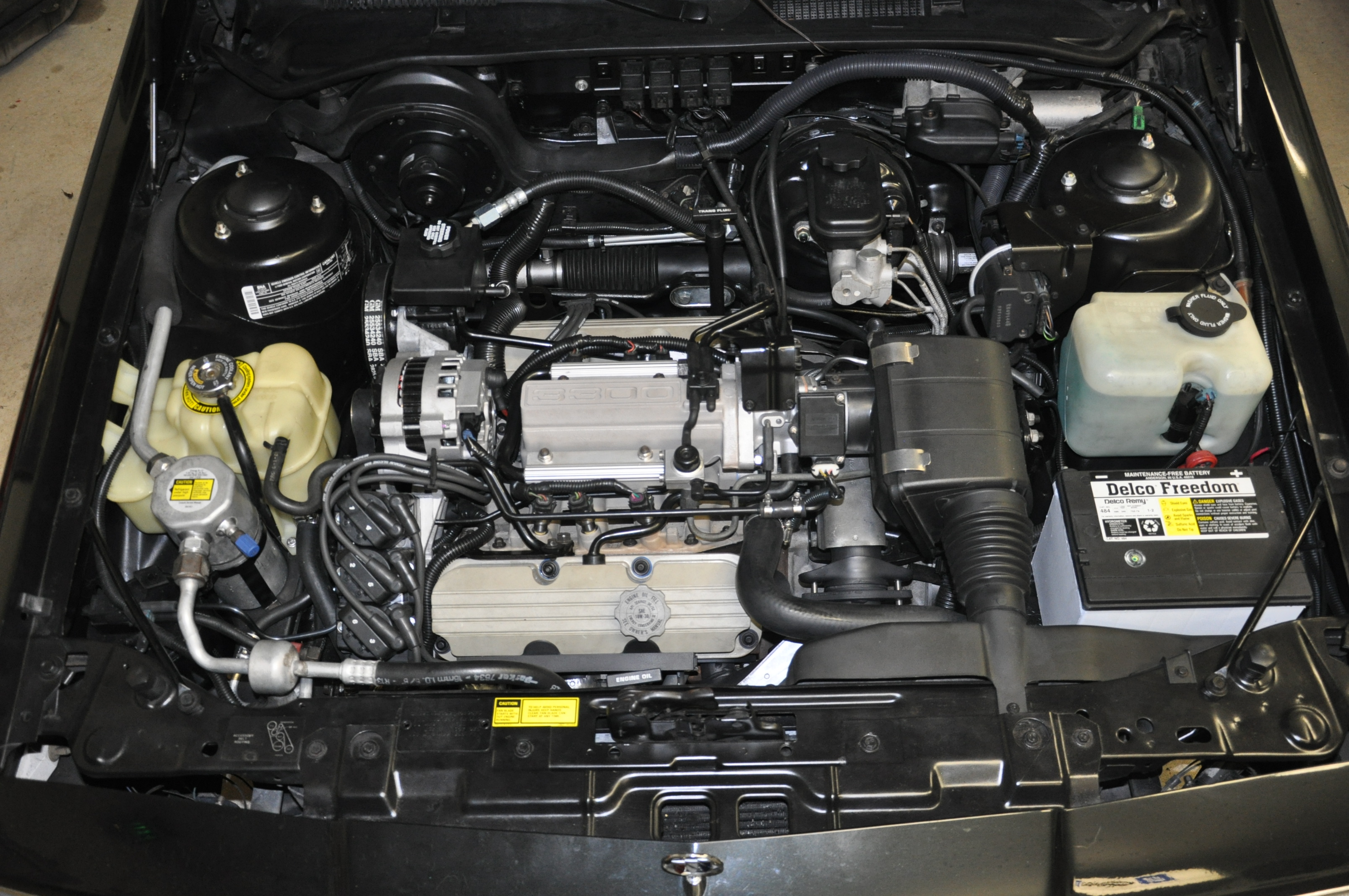
General Motors 3300 V6 (VIN N) in a 1990 Buick Skylark Luxury Edition.

A smaller 3.3 liter 3300 was introduced in 1989 and produced through 1993. It was effectively a lower-deck version of the 3800, with a smaller bore and stroke of 3.7 in × 3.16 in (94.0 mm × 80.3 mm) for 3,341 cc (3.3 L; 203.9 cu in). Like the 3800, it used a cast iron block and heads, push rods, and hydraulic lifters. Unlike the 3800, however, it used a batch-fire injection system rather than sequential injection, as evidenced by the lack of a cam position sensor. It also did not have a balance shaft. Power output was 160 hp (119 kW) at 5,200 rpm and 185 lb⋅ft (251 N⋅m) at 2,000 rpm with a 5,500 rpm redline.

Applications:
- 1989–1993 Buick Century
- 1989–1993 Buick Skylark
- 1992–1993 Pontiac Grand Am
- 1992–1993 Oldsmobile Achieva
- 1989–1991 Oldsmobile Calais
- 1989–1993 Oldsmobile Cutlass Ciera

=== Series I ===
==== L27 SI Naturally Aspirated ====
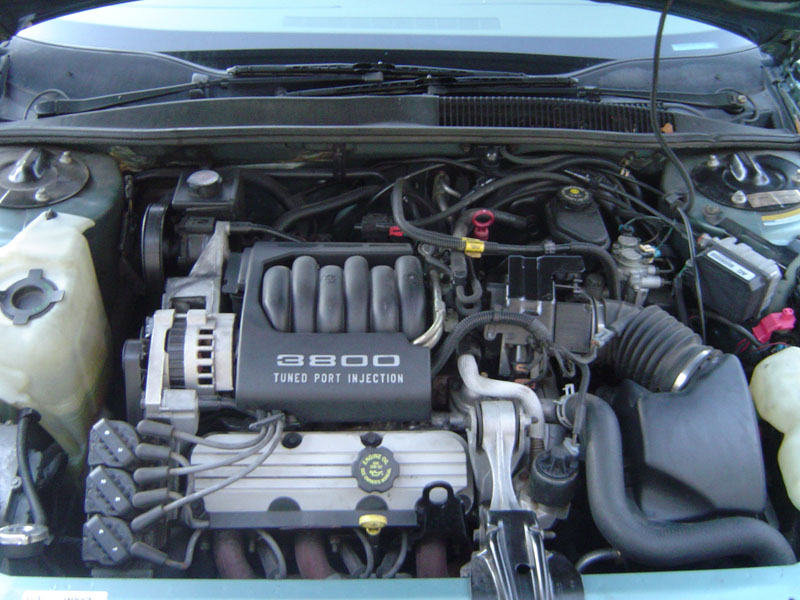
A 3800 Series I L27 naturally aspirated engine installed transversely in a 1995 Buick Regal.

The LN3 was replaced by the 3,791 cc (3.8 L; 231.3 cu in) L27 in mid-1990 and produces 170 hp (127 kW). The slight power increase was accompanied by more torque in the mid-range, all thanks to a new, two-piece intake manifold with longer runners. Other improvements over the LN3 included wider connecting rod bearings, a new timing chain tensioner, dual-wall exhaust pipes, new heat shields for the exhaust manifolds, and sound absorbing, composite molded valve covers. This engine is referred to as the Series I 3800, or 3800 TPI (Tuned Port Injection).

In Australia, the LN3 was also replaced by the L27 by Holden who used the engine in their series 2 (1991) VN Commodore range. However, the Australian L27 retained the LN3's one piece upper intake and lower plenum. Power was still boosted to 127 kW (170 hp) for the Holden L27, before being boosted to 130 kW (177 PS; 174 hp) in the revised VR Commodore in 1993. The L36 made its debut in 1995.

Applications:
- 1992–1995 Buick LeSabre
- 1991–1994 Buick Park Avenue
- 1991 Buick Reatta
- 1990–1995 Buick Regal
- 1991–1993 Buick Riviera
- 1992–1995 Chevrolet Lumina APV
- 1991–1995 Holden Commodore (VNII, VP, VR)
- Holden Caprice (VQ, VR)
- 1992–1994 Pontiac Bonneville
- 1992–1995 Pontiac Trans Sport
- 1992–1994 Oldsmobile Eighty-Eight
- 1992–1994 Oldsmobile Ninety-Eight
- 1991–1992 Oldsmobile Toronado
- 1991–1992 Oldsmobile Toronado Trofeo
- 1992–1995 Oldsmobile Silhouette

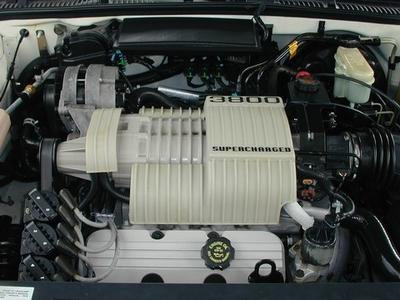
A supercharged 3800 (transverse mount) installed in a Buick Riviera for 1995, the last year of Series I L67 production. Power is 225 hp (168 kW)/275 lb⋅ft (373 N⋅m) for this version.

==== L67 SI Supercharged ====
The Series I Supercharged engine went through two supercharger revisions (Gen2 and Gen3) and the horsepower improved between initial launch and the time that the Series II L36 was introduced. The M62 supercharger was manufactured by Eaton, for the GM 3800 SI engine. HP was rated at 205 for 1991–1993 engines (Gen2 supercharger) with a 2.55-inch (65 mm) pulley, and 225 for 1994–1995 engines (Gen3 supercharger). All of the additional horsepower for 1994–95 Gen3 supercharged engines was gained by using epoxy (not Teflon as commonly believed) coated supercharger rotors to improve efficiency, a larger supercharger inlet and throttle body. Thus, the Gen3 utilized a 2.85-inch (72 mm) pulley versus the 2.55-inch (65 mm) pulley on the Gen2. The easiest way to spot the difference between the Gen2 and Gen3 is the smaller pulley and the ribs on the side of the Gen2 extend all the way down the sides, while the Gen3 ribs are on only the top. They perform slightly differently, and interchanging one without tuning may cause engine problems. Redline on Gen3 engines is at 6000 rpm, but the ECM will shift at 5400 rpm without performance shift enabled.

Applications:
- 1991–1995 Buick Park Avenue Ultra
- 1992–1995 Oldsmobile Ninety-Eight Regency Elite (optional), Touring Sedan
- 1992-1995 Pontiac Bonneville SE with H4U RPO, not badged - SLE (optional SC package), SSE (optional), and SSEi
- 1995 Buick Riviera (optional)
- 1995 Oldsmobile Eighty-Eight LS (optional), LSS (optional)

=== Series II ===
Introduced in 1995, the Series II is by far the most popular of the 3800 family, known for its power, smoothness, fuel efficiency, and reliability. Although the stroke and bore for the 3.8 liter engine remained at 3.4 in (86 mm), and 3.8 in (97 mm) respectively, the engine architecture was vastly changed. The deck height is shorter than the Series I, reducing weight and total engine package size. This required that the piston connecting rods be shortened 1 in (25.4 mm), and the crankshaft was also redesigned. A new intake manifold improved breathing while a redesigned cylinder head featured larger valves and a higher compression ratio. The result was 205 hp (153 kW) and 230 lb⋅ft (312 N⋅m), better fuel economy, and 26 lb (12 kg) lighter overall weight down to 392 lb (178 kg). This 3800 weighs only 22 lb (10 kg) more than the all-aluminum High Feature V6 that currently dominates GM's six-cylinder applications, despite being an all cast-iron design.

To meet emissions standards, an EGR tube was placed in a new, improved higher airflow intake manifold to reduce combustion temperatures.

The 3800 Series II was on the Ward's 10 Best Engines list for 1995 through 1997.

GM recalled 1.5 million vehicles with this engine on April 14, 2009 due to risk of fire from engine oil leaking under the valve cover gaskets onto hot exhaust manifolds. The fire could spread to the nearby plastic spark plug wire retainers on the valve cover and then to the rest of the engine compartment. GM fitted the affected vehicles with redesigned spark plug wire retainers. These engines were noted for having problems with the plastic upper intake manifold cracking around the EGR passage. The engine would then hydrolock. The lower intake gaskets and upper intake manifolds were revised, correcting all these issues.

==== L36 SII Naturally Aspirated ====
Applications:

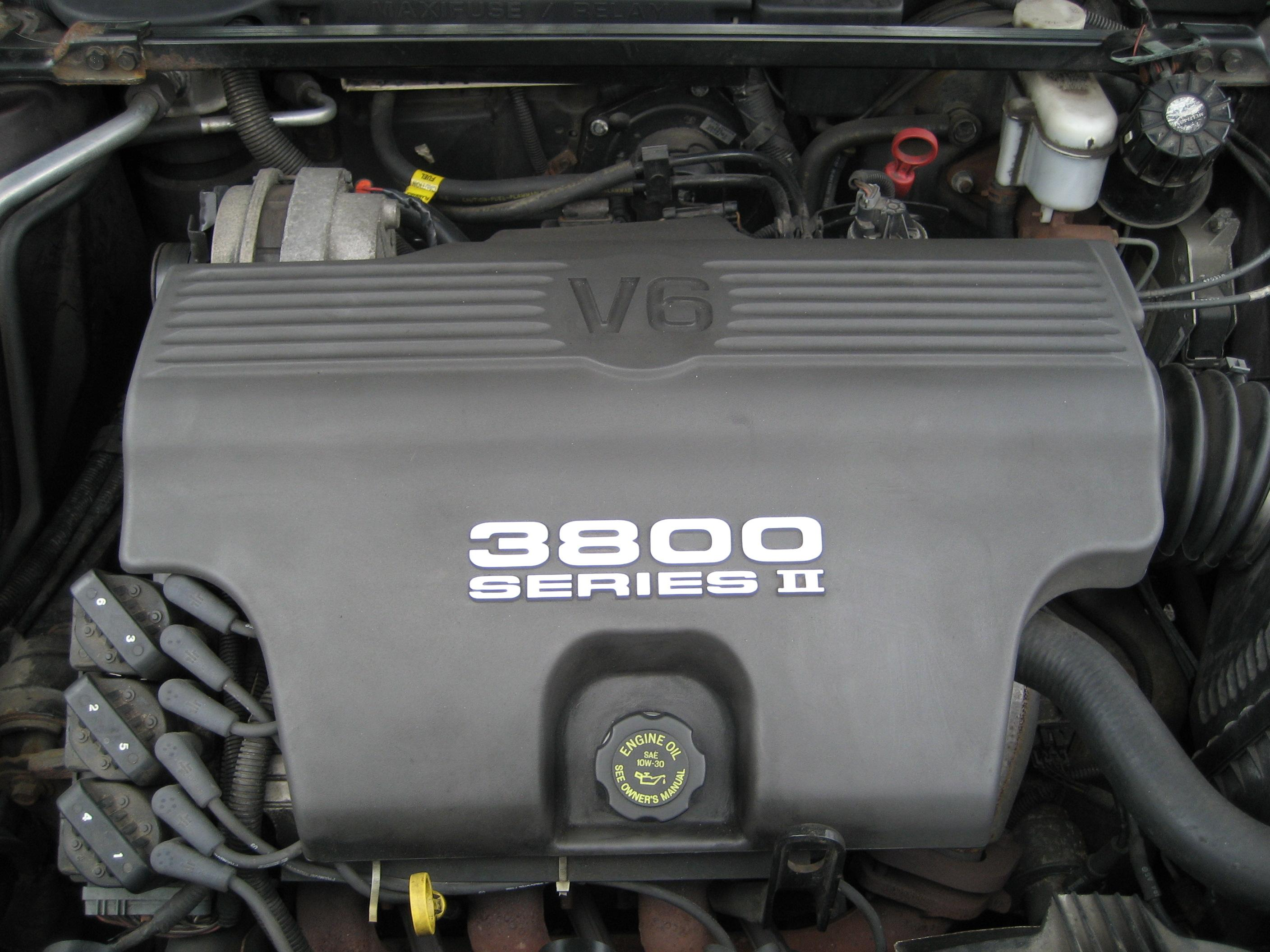
Another variation of the L36 engine in a 1995 Oldsmobile 88

- 1996–2005 Buick LeSabre
- 1995–2005 Buick Park Avenue
- 1996–2004 Buick Regal LS
- 1995–1997 Buick Riviera
- 1999–2006 Chevrolet Caprice
- 1995 California only, 1996–2002 Chevrolet Camaro
- 2000–2005 Chevrolet Impala
- 1998–1999 Chevrolet Lumina LTZ
- 1999–2004 Chevrolet Omega CD
- 1998–2005 Chevrolet Monte Carlo (Z34, LT, SS)
- 1995–2004 Holden Commodore (VS, VT, VX, VY)
- Holden Caprice (VS, WH, WK)
- Holden Ute (VU, VY)
- 1995–1996 Oldsmobile Ninety-Eight
- 1995–1999 Oldsmobile Eighty-Eight
- 1998–1999 Oldsmobile Intrigue
- 1996–1998 Oldsmobile LSS
- 1997–1998 Oldsmobile Regency
- 1995–2005 Pontiac Bonneville
- 1995 California only, 1996–2002 Pontiac Firebird
- 1997–2003 Pontiac Grand Prix

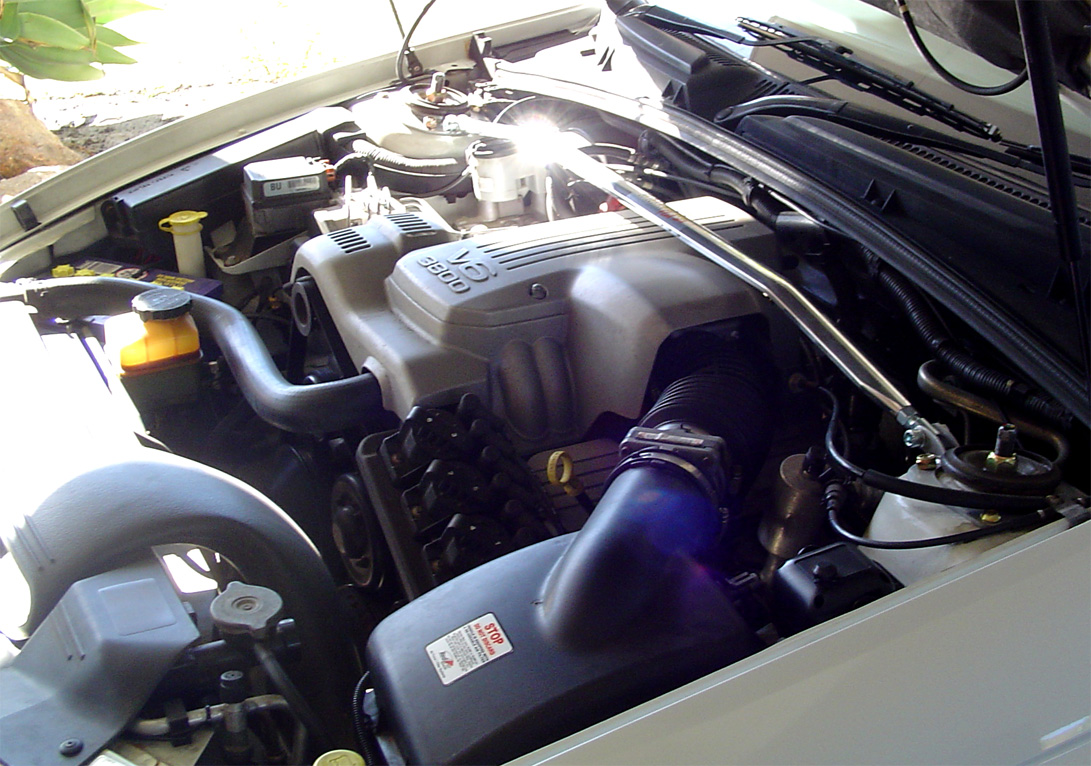
A variation of the L36 engine in a 1998 Holden VT Commodore

==== L67 SII Supercharged ====
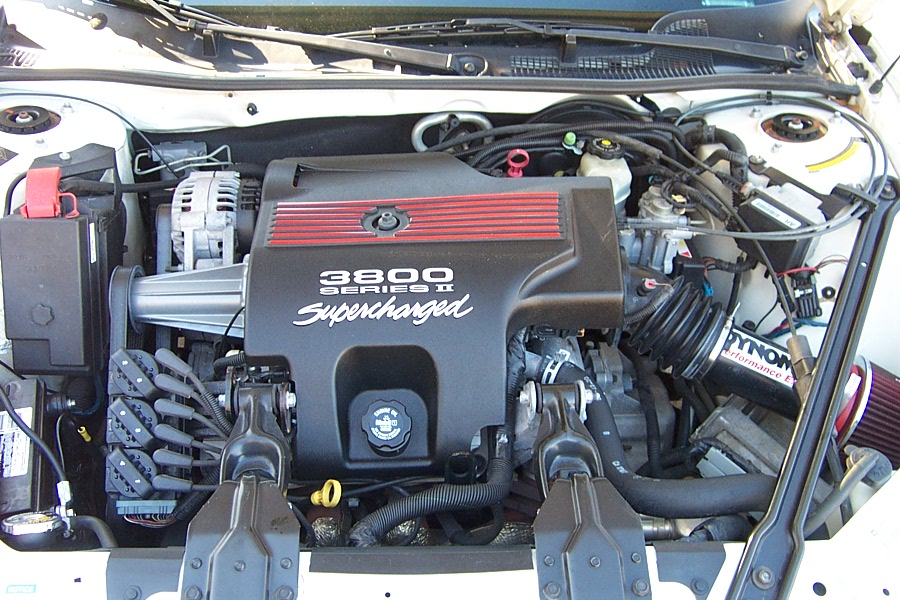
A 3800 Series II L67 Supercharged V6 engine in a 1998 Buick Regal GS.

The L67 is the supercharged version of the 3800 Series II L36 and appeared in 1996, one year after the naturally aspirated version. It uses the Eaton Generation III M90 supercharger with a 3.8 in (97 mm) pulley, a larger throttle body, different fuel injectors, different cylinder heads, and a different lower intake manifold. The L67 and L36 do not share pistons. L67 pistons are heavier and have a different height to lower compression. Both engines share the same engine blocks, but compression is reduced from 9.4:1 in the L36 to 8.5:1 for the L67. GM listed the engine output as 240 hp (179 kW) and 280 lb⋅ft (380 N⋅m) of torque. Final drive ratios are reduced in most applications, for better fuel economy and for improved use of the engine's torque in the low RPM range. Like most 3800 V6s, the engine is well known for its reliability and low maintenance costs. The engine is a popular choice for aftermarket modification thanks to its very strong internals and impressive power gains from basic upgrades. The engine was built in Flint, Michigan, and was certified LEV in 2001.

Applications:
- 1996 Buick Park Avenue Ultra (C-body)
- 1997–2005 Buick Park Avenue Ultra (G-body)
- 1997.5–2004 Buick Regal GS / GSE / GSX (SLP)
- 1996–1999 Buick Riviera (optional 1996-97, std. 1998-99)
- 2004–2005 Chevrolet Impala SS
- 2004–2005 Chevrolet Monte Carlo SS Supercharged
- 1996–1999 Oldsmobile Eighty-Eight LSS (limited)
- 1996–1999 Pontiac Bonneville SSEi (H-body)
- 2000–2003 Pontiac Bonneville SSEi (G-body)
- 1997–2003 Pontiac Grand Prix GTP / GTX (SLP)
- 1996–2004 Holden Commodore VS (series II), VT, VX, VY
- 1996–2004 Holden Caprice and Statesman VS (Series I, II, and III), WH, WK
- 2001–2004 Holden Monaro (V2) CV6

=== Series III ===
The Series III engines include many changes. The upper and lower intake manifold is now aluminum on the naturally aspirated models. Intake ports are mildy enlarged; 1.83 in (46.5 mm) intake valves (instead of 1.8 in (45.7 mm) as on Series II) and 1.52 in (38.6 mm) exhaust valves were introduced in 2003 engines, just before switching to Series III. Electronic throttle control is added to all versions, as is returnless fuel injection. Stronger powdered metal sinter forged connecting rods are used in 2004+ supercharged, and 2005+ naturally aspirated engines, instead of the cast iron style from Series II engines. Emissions are also reduced.

Also note that Series III engines are the base for any 3800 produced for the 2004 year and up. This means the same block, heads, and connecting rods apply to any remaining Series II engines made after 2004 also. The difference is that Series III engines received the new superchargers (Generation 5 – Eaton M90 – if equipped), intake manifolds, fuel systems, powdered connecting rods, as well as larger intake valves, drive by wire throttle body and electronics.

==== L26 SIII Naturally Aspirated ====
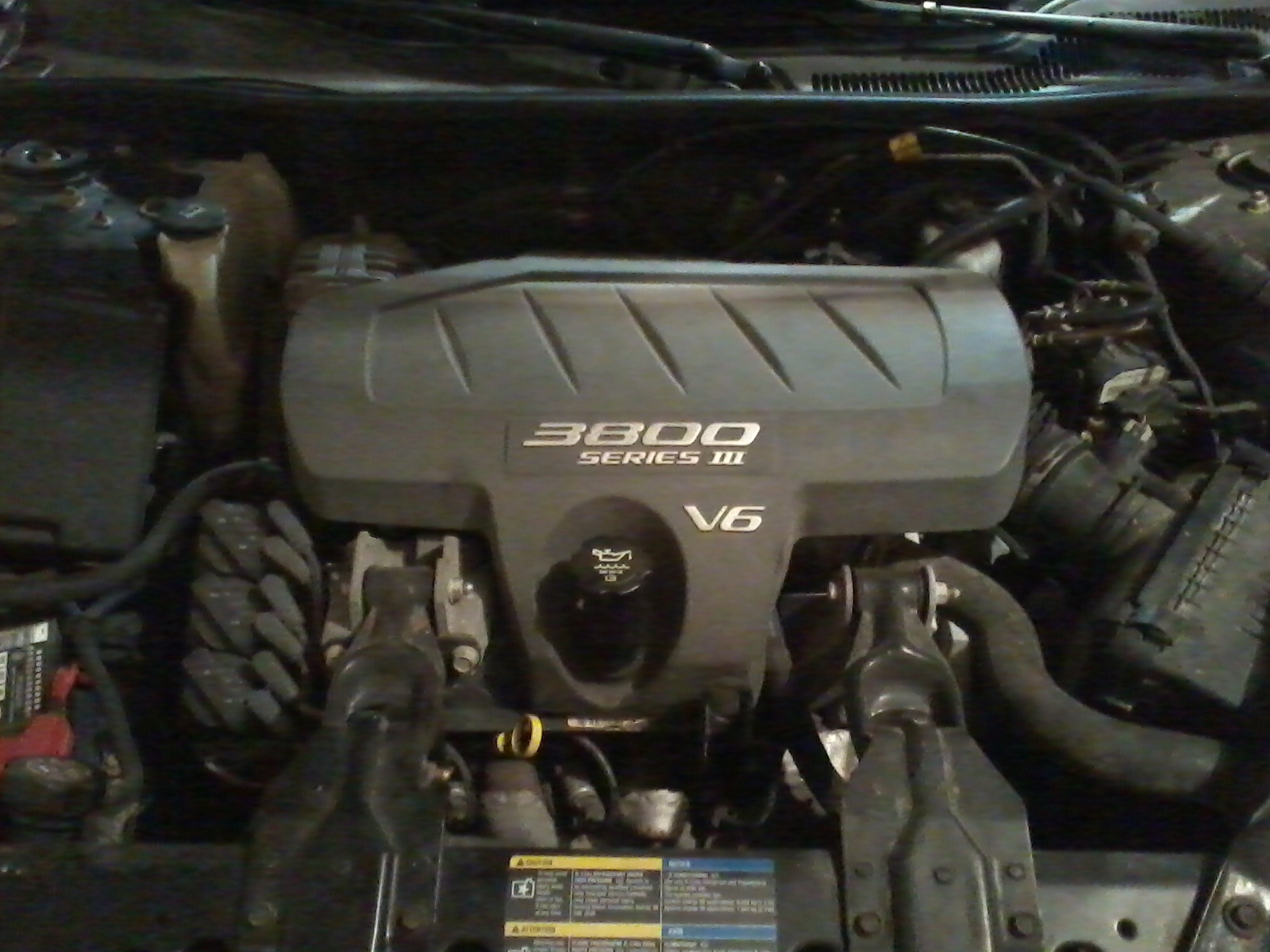
L26 engine in a Pontiac Grand Prix

The L26 is the Series III version of the 3800. It is still a 3.8 L (231 cu in) design. Compression remains at 9.4:1 as with the L36, but the aluminum upper and lower intake (2004+) and stronger connecting rods (2005+) are the primary physical changes. The powdered metal connecting rods were meant to be introduced in 2004 along with the L32, but the GM plant in Bay City, Michigan that supplies the Flint, Michigan plant could not achieve the desired production dates in time for that engine year.

Applications:
- 2004–2008 Pontiac Grand Prix
- 2005–2009 Buick LaCrosse/Allure
- 2006–2008 Buick Lucerne

==== L32 SIII Supercharged ====
The L32 is a supercharged Series III. Introduced in 2004, the main differences between the L67 and the L32 are the L32's electronic throttle control, slightly improved cylinder head design, and updated Eaton supercharger, the Generation 5 M90. Power output is up to 260 hp (194 kW) in the Grand Prix GTP.

As with the L67 (Series 2 supercharged), premium fuel (91 octane or higher) is required due to the boost provided by the supercharger, but the PCM can compensate for lower octane fuel at the cost of lower power output. The use of below 87 octane fuel can cause detonation that eventually leads to engine damage and failure.

Applications:
- 2004–2005 Pontiac Grand Prix GTP
- 2006–2007 Pontiac Grand Prix GT

== Special Editions ==
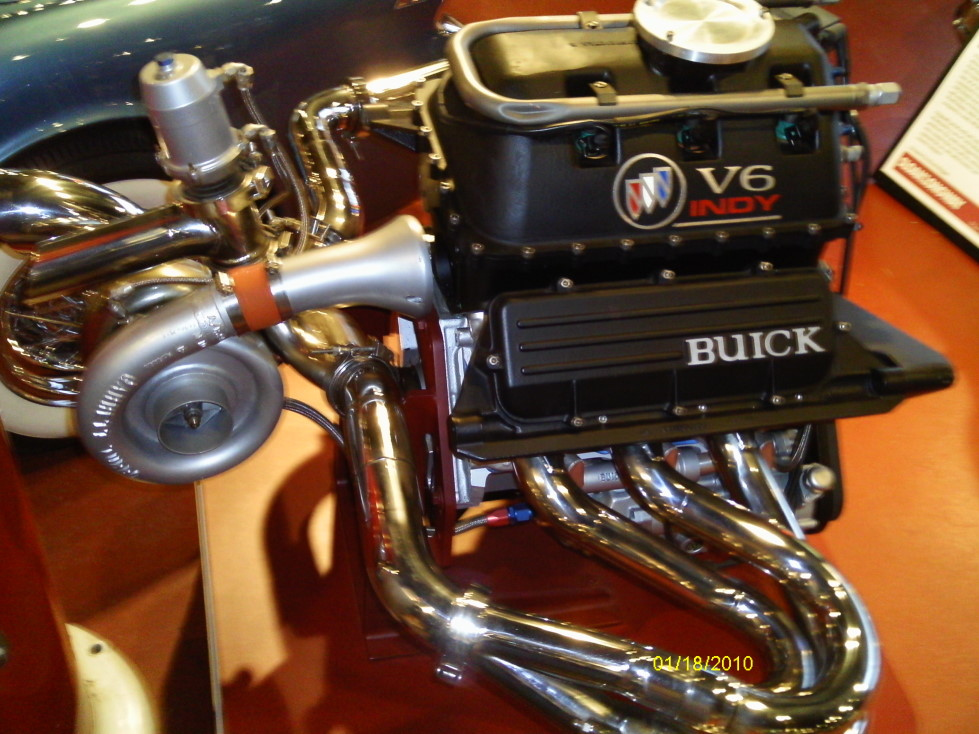
Buick 3300 Indy CART / USAC turbo V6

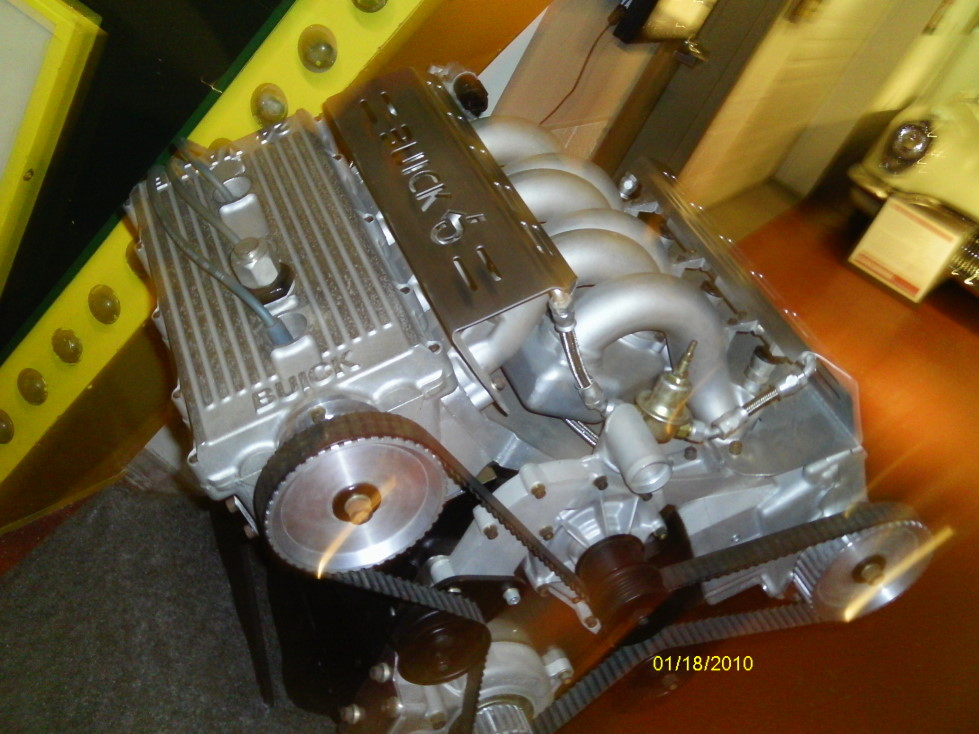
1985 Buick Wildcat 24-valve V6

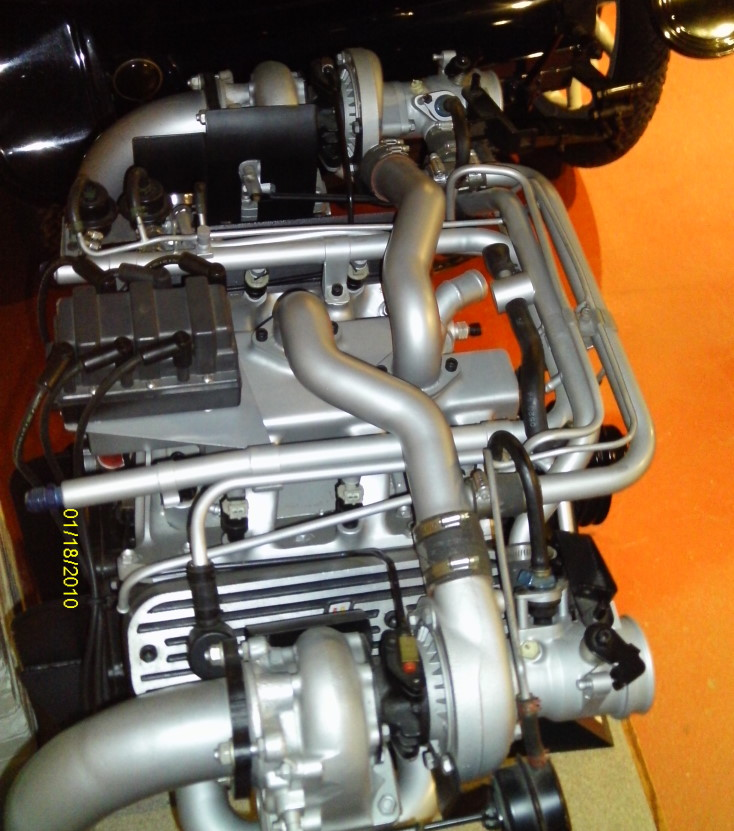
1983 Buick Indy 500 Pace Car twin turbo V6
