= 1995 Australian Touring Car season =

Seasons
- ← 1994 1996 →

The 1995 Australian Touring Car season was the 36th year of touring car racing in Australia since the first runnings of the Australian Touring Car Championship and the fore-runner of the present day Bathurst 1000, the Armstrong 500.

Two major touring car categories raced in Australia during 1995, V8 Supercar and Super Touring. Between them there were 24 touring car race meetings held during 1995; a ten-round series for V8 Supercars, the 1995 Australian Touring Car Championship (ATCC); an eight-round series for Super Touring, the 1995 Australian Super Touring Championship (ASTC); support programme events at the 1995 Australian Grand Prix and 1995 Indycar Australia, two stand alone long-distance races, nicknamed 'enduros'; the fourth and final running of the Winfield Triple Challenge at Eastern Creek Raceway and the TAC Peter Brock Classic held at Calder Park Raceway.

== Results and standings ==
=== Race calendar ===
The 1995 Australian touring car season consisted of 24 events.

Date	Series	Circuit	City / state	Winner	Team	Car	Report
22 Jan	Winfield Triple Challenge	Eastern Creek Raceway	Sydney, New South Wales	Alan Jones	Peter Jackson Racing	Ford EB Falcon	
5 Feb	ATCC Round 1	Sandown International Raceway	Melbourne, Victoria	Larry Perkins	Castrol Perkins Racing	Holden VR Commodore	Report
26 Feb	ATCC Round 2	Symmons Plains Raceway	Launceston, Tasmania	John Bowe	Shell FAI Racing	Ford EF Falcon	Report
5 Mar	ASTC Round 1	Phillip Island Grand Prix Circuit	Phillip Island, Victoria	Paul Morris	Diet Coke BMW Racing	BMW 318i	
12 Mar	ATCC Round 3	Mount Panorama Circuit	Bathurst, New South Wales	John Bowe	Shell FAI Racing	Ford EF Falcon	Report
18 - 19 Mar	Super Touring Cars	Surfers Paradise street circuit	Surfers Paradise, Queensland	Greg Murphy	Orix Audi Sport Australia	Audi 80 Quattro	
2 Apr	ASTC Round 2	Oran Park Raceway	Sydney, New South Wales	Geoff Brabham	Diet Coke BMW Racing	BMW 318i	
9 Apr	ATCC Round 4	Phillip Island Grand Prix Circuit	Phillip Island, Victoria	Glenn Seton	Peter Jackson Racing	Ford EF Falcon	
23 Apr	ATCC Round 5	Lakeside International Raceway	Brisbane, Queensland	Glenn Seton	Peter Jackson Racing	Ford EF Falcon	
7 May	ASTC Round 3	Symmons Plains Raceway	Launceston, Tasmania	Geoff Brabham	Diet Coke BMW Racing	BMW 318i	
13 May	ASTC Round 4	Calder Park Raceway	Melbourne, Victoria	Paul Morris	Diet Coke BMW Racing	BMW 318i	
21 May	ATCC Round 6	Winton Motor Raceway	Benalla, Victoria	John Bowe	Shell FAI Racing	Ford EF Falcon	
28 May	ATCC Round 7	Eastern Creek Raceway	Sydney, New South Wales	Mark Skaife	Winfield Racing Team	Holden VR Commodore	
4 Jun	ASTC Round 5	Mallala Motor Sport Park	Adelaide, South Australia	Geoff Brabham	Diet Coke BMW Racing	BMW 318i	
9 Jul	ATCC Round 8	Mallala Motor Sport Park	Adelaide, South Australia	Glenn Seton	Peter Jackson Racing	Ford EF Falcon	
16 Jul	ATCC Round 9	Barbagallo Raceway	Perth, Western Australia	Glenn Seton	Peter Jackson Racing	Ford EF Falcon	
23 Jul	ASTC Round 6	Lakeside International Raceway	Brisbane, Queensland	Paul Morris	Diet Coke BMW Racing	BMW 318i	
6 Aug	ATCC Round 10	Oran Park Raceway	Sydney, New South Wales	John Bowe	Shell FAI Racing	Ford EF Falcon	
13 Aug	ASTC Round 7	Winton Motor Raceway	Benalla, Victoria	Brad Jones	Orix Audi Sport Australia	Audi 80 Quattro	
26 Aug	ASTC Round 8	Eastern Creek Raceway	Sydney, New South Wales	Brad Jones	Orix Audi Sport Australia	Audi 80 Quattro	
10 Sep	Repco Sandown 500	Sandown International Raceway	Melbourne, Victoria	Dick Johnson; John Bowe	Shell FAI Racing	Ford EF Falcon	report
1 Oct	Tooheys 1000	Mount Panorama Circuit	Bathurst, New South Wales	Larry Perkins; Russell Ingall	Castrol Perkins Racing	Holden VR Commodore	report
10 - 12 Nov	Clipsal 2.0L Super Touring Car Trophy	Adelaide Street Circuit	Adelaide, South Australia	Jim Richards	Ross Palmer Motorsport	Ford Mondeo	
10 - 12 Nov	EDS Five-Litre V8 Touring Cars	Adelaide Street Circuit	Adelaide, South Australia	John Bowe	Shell FAI Racing	Ford EF Falcon	
25 Nov	TAC Peter Brock Classic Super Touring	Calder Park Raceway	Melbourne, Victoria	Brad Jones	Orix Audi Sport Australia	Audi 80 Quattro	
25 Nov	TAC Peter Brock Classic	Calder Park Raceway	Melbourne, Victoria	Peter Brock	Holden Racing Team	Holden VR Commodore	

=== Winfield Triple Challenge ===
Held at Eastern Creek Raceway this was a pre-season race meeting which featured superbikes and drag racing as well as touring cars to complete the Winfield Triple Challenge.

Driver	No.	Team	Car	Race 1	Race 2	Race 3	Points
(Australia) Alan Jones	35	Peter Jackson Racing	Ford EB Falcon	2	1	1	79
(Australia) Glenn Seton	30	Peter Jackson Racing	Ford EF Falcon	1	2	2	77
(Australia) Neil Crompton	7	Coca-Cola Racing	Holden VP Commodore	4	5	3	69
(Australia) Larry Perkins	11	Castrol Perkins Racing	Holden VR Commodore	5	4	4	67
(Australia) Wayne Gardner	4	Coca-Cola Racing	Holden VR Commodore	3	3	6	66
(New Zealand) Jim Richards	2	Winfield Racing Team	Holden VP Commodore	6	7	5	61
(Australia) Gregg Hansford	9	Castrol Perkins Racing	Holden VP Commodore	7	6	7	57
(Australia) David Attard	49	Alcair Racing	Holden VP Commodore	9	8	8	51
(Australia) Steve Reed	3	Lansvale Racing Team	Holden VP Commodore	8	9	9	49
(Australia) Terry Finnigan	27	Sony Autosound	Holden VP Commodore	10	10	11	42
(Australia) Neil Schembri	36	Schembri Motorsport	Holden VP Commodore	12	12	12	36
(Australia) Bruce Stewart	32	Pro-Duct Motorsport	Holden VP Commodore	11	11	14	34
(Australia) Bob Pearson	33	Pro-Duct Motorsport	Holden VP Commodore	13	DNF	10	30
(Australia) Garry Willmington	41	Garry Willmington Performance	Ford EB Falcon	14	13	16	15
(Australia) Claude Giorgi	34		Ford EB Falcon	DNF	DNS	DNF	
(Australia) Mark Skaife	1	Winfield Racing Team	Holden VR Commodore	DNS	DNS	DNS	

=== Gold Coast Super Touring Cup ===
This meeting was a support event of the 1995 Indycar Australia at the Surfers Paradise Street Circuit, and considered part of the Gold Coast 600 history.

Driver	No.	Team	Car	Race 1	Race 2
(New Zealand) Greg Murphy	8	Orix Audi Sport Australia	Audi 80 Quattro	2	1
(Australia) Geoff Brabham	83	Diet Coke BMW Racing	BMW 318i	3	2
(Australia) Charlie O'Brien	15	BMW International	BMW 318i	4	3
(United Kingdom) Jeff Allam	77	Ross Palmer	Ford Mondeo	5	4
(Australia) Brad Jones	34	Orix Audi Sport Australia	Audi 80 Quattro	1	5
(Australia) Paul Morris	1	Diet Coke BMW Racing	BMW 318i	DNF	6
(Australia) Steven Ellery	4	Steven Ellery Racing	BMW 318i	8	7
(Australia) Tony Scott	11	Volvo Cars Australia	Volvo 850 Estate	7	8
(Australia) Justin Mathews	13	Bob Holden Motors	BMW M3	10	9
(Australia) Bob Tweedie	79		Ford Sierra	12	10
(Australia) Bob Holden	16	Bob Holden Motors	BMW M3	DNF	11
(Australia) Les Grose	12	Darrel Dixon	Peugeot 405 Mi16	11	12
(Australia) Peter Hills	98	Knight Racing	Ford Sierra	DNF	13
(New Zealand) Steven Richards	32	Garry Rogers Motorsport	Alfa Romeo 155	6	DNF
(Australia) Paul Pickett	58	Triple P Racing	BMW 318iS	9	DNF
(Australia) Melinda Price	26	Inspired Racing	Toyota Corolla Seca	13	DNF

=== Clipsal 2.0L Super Touring Car Trophy ===
This meeting was a support event of the 1995 Australian Grand Prix.

Driver	No.	Team	Car	Race 1	Race 2
(New Zealand) Jim Richards	77	Ross Palmer Motorsport	Ford Mondeo	1	1
(New Zealand) Steven Richards	34	Garry Rogers Motorsport	Alfa Romeo 155	4	2
(Australia) Brad Jones	18	Orix Audi Sport Australia	Audi 80 Quattro	2	3
(Australia) Paul Morris	2	Diet Coke BMW Racing	BMW 320i	10	4
(New Zealand) Greg Murphy	8	Orix Audi Sport Australia	Audi 80 Quattro	3	5
(Australia) Geoff Brabham	83	Diet Coke BMW Racing	BMW 320i	5	6
(Australia) Les May	66	Les May Racing	BMW M3	11	7
(Australia) Bob Holden	16	Bob Holden Motors	BMW M3	17	8
(Australia) Bob Tweedie	79		Ford Sierra	14	9
(Australia) Paul Pickett	58	Triple P Racing	BMW 318iS	13	10
(Australia) Justin Mathews	13	Bob Holden Motors	BMW M3	12	11
(Australia) Peter Hills	98	Knight Racing	Ford Sierra	16	12
(Australia) Mike Imrie	78	Darrel Dixon	Peugeot 405 Mi16	DNF	13
(Australia) Geoff Full	95	Phoenix Motorsport	Peugeot 405 Mi16	6	DNF
(Australia) Graham Moore	14	Sentul Motorsport Team	Opel Vectra	7	DNF
(Australia) Cameron McLean	4	Greenfield Mowers Racing	BMW 318i	8	DNF
(Australia) Tony Scott	11	Volvo Cars Australia	Volvo 850 Estate	9	DNF
(New Zealand) Dennis Chapman	50		BMW 318i	15	DNF
(Australia) Mark Adderton	96	Phoenix Motorsport	Peugeot 405 Mi16	DNF	DNS

=== EDS Five-Litre V8 Touring Cars ===
This meeting was a support event of the 1995 Australian Grand Prix.

Driver	No.	Team	Car	Race 1	Race 2
(Australia) John Bowe	18	Shell FAI Racing	Ford EF Falcon	1	1
(Australia) Larry Perkins	11	Castrol Perkins Racing	Holden VR Commodore	4	2
(Australia) Dick Johnson	17	Shell FAI Racing	Ford EF Falcon	7	3
(Australia) Neil Crompton	7	Coca-Cola Racing	Holden VR Commodore	6	4
(Australia) Glenn Seton	30	Peter Jackson Racing	Ford EF Falcon	2	5
(Australia) Tony Longhurst	25	Castrol Longhurst Ford	Ford EF Falcon	5	6
(Australia) Peter Brock	05	Holden Racing Team	Holden VR Commodore	8	7
(Australia) Alan Jones	35	Peter Jackson Racing	Ford EF Falcon	10	8
(Australia) Tomas Mezera	015	Holden Racing Team	Holden VR Commodore	9	9
(Australia) Mark Poole	38	James Rosenberg Racing	Holden VR Commodore	11	10
(Australia) Mark Larkham	10	Mitre 10 Racing	Ford EF Falcon	16	11
(Australia) Chris Smerdon	39	Challenge Motorsport	Holden VR Commodore	15	12
(Australia) Terry Finnigan	27	Sony Autosound	Holden VP Commodore	DNF	13
(Australia) Paul Romano	24	Romano Racing	Holden VP Commodore	14	14
(Australia) Peter Doulman	12	M3 Motorsport	Holden VP Commodore	DNF	15
(Australia) Wayne Russell	62		Holden VP Commodore	18	16
(Australia) Greg Crick	49	Alcair Racing	Holden VP Commodore	13	17
(Australia) Peter McLeod	60	Enzed	Holden VR Commodore	17	18
(Australia) Phil Ward	13	Phil Ward Racing	Holden VR Commodore	12	19
(Australia) Wayne Gardner	4	Coca-Cola Racing	Holden VR Commodore	3	DNF

=== TAC Peter Brock Classic Super Touring ===
This meeting was a one-off celebration of the career of Peter Brock held at Calder Park Raceway.

Driver	No.	Team	Car	Race 1	Race 2	Points
(Australia) Brad Jones	18	Orix Audi Sport Australia	Audi 80 Quattro	1	2	36
(New Zealand) Steven Richards	34	Garry Rogers Motorsport	Alfa Romeo 155	3	1	34
(Australia) Tony Scott	11	Volvo Racing Australia	Volvo 850 Estate	4	3	26
(Australia) Cameron McLean	4	Greenfield Mowers Racing	BMW 318i	5	4	22
(Australia) Les May	66	Les May Racing	BMW M3	6	5	18
(New Zealand) Jim Richards	77	Ross Palmer Motorsport	Ford Mondeo	2	DNF	16
(Australia) Justin Mathews	13	Bob Holden Motors	BMW M3	7	6	14
(Australia) Bob Holden	16	Bob Holden Motors	BMW M3	DNF	7	6

=== TAC Peter Brock Classic ===
This meeting was a one-off celebration of the career of Peter Brock held at Calder Park Raceway.

Driver	No.	Team	Car	Race 1	Race 2	Points
(Australia) Peter Brock	05	Holden Racing Team	Holden VR Commodore	3	1	34
(Australia) Glenn Seton	30	Peter Jackson Racing	Ford EF Falcon	1	4	32
(Australia) Larry Perkins	11	Castrol Perkins Racing	Holden VR Commodore	2	3	30
(Australia) John Bowe	18	Shell FAI Racing	Ford EF Falcon	6	2	24
(Australia) Dick Johnson	17	Shell FAI Racing	Ford EF Falcon	4	7	18
(Australia) Mark Skaife	1	Winfield Racing Team	Holden VR Commodore	DNF	5	10
(Australia) Craig Lowndes	015	Holden Racing Team	Holden VR Commodore	5	DNF	10
(Australia) David Parsons	35	Peter Jackson Racing	Ford EF Falcon	18	6	8
(Australia) Neil Crompton	7	Coca-Cola Racing	Holden VR Commodore	7	DNF	6
(Australia) Paul Romano	24	Romano Racing	Holden VP Commodore	13	8	4
(Australia) Greg Crick	49	Alcair Racing	Holden VP Commodore	8	11	4
(Australia) Chris Smerdon	39	Challenge Motorsport	Holden VP Commodore	11	9	2
(Australia) Wayne Gardner	4	Coca-Cola Racing	Holden VR Commodore	9	DNF	2
(Australia) Terry Finnigan	27	Sony Autosound	Holden VP Commodore	15	10	1
(Australia) Mark Poole	38	James Rosenberg Racing	Holden VP Commodore	10	DNF	1
(Australia) John Trimbole	47	Daily Planet Racing	Ford EB Falcon	17	12	
(Australia) Wayne Russell	62		Holden VP Commodore	19	13	
(Australia) Steve Reed	3	Lansvale Racing Team	Holden VP Commodore	14	14	
(Australia) John Cotter	12	M3 Motorsport	Holden VP Commodore	20	15	
(Australia) Peter McLeod	60	Enzed	Holden VR Commodore	16	DNF	
(Australia) Mark Larkham	10	Mitre 10 Racing	Ford EF Falcon	12	DNS	
(Australia) Malcolm Stenniken	31		Holden VR Commodore	DNF	DNS	
