= 1996 AMP Bathurst 1000 =

Motor race in Australia

1996 Bathurst 1000

Seasons
- ← 1995 1997 (ST); 1997 (V8) →

Layout of the Mount Panorama Circuit

The 1996 AMP Bathurst 1000 was an endurance race for Group 3A 5.0 Litre Touring Cars held on 6 October 1996 at the Mount Panorama Circuit near Bathurst in New South Wales, Australia. The race, which was the 37th running of the Bathurst 1000, was won by Craig Lowndes and Greg Murphy driving a Holden VR Commodore.

== Entry list ==
No.	Drivers	Team (Sponsor)	Car	No.	Drivers	Team (Sponsor)	Car
1	(Australia) Craig Lowndes (New Zealand) Greg Murphy	Holden Racing Team (Holden, Mobil 1)	Holden Commodore VR	32	(New Zealand) Steven Richards (New Zealand) Jim Richards	Garry Rogers Motorsport (Valvoline, Cummins)	Holden Commodore VR
2	(Australia) Mark Skaife (United Kingdom) John Cleland	Gibson Motorsport (Holden Network Q, Sega Saturn)	Holden Commodore VR	36	(Australia) Bill O'Brien (Australia) Brian Callaghan, Jr. (Australia) Ron Barnacle	O'Brien Automotive (Everlast Automotive)	Holden Commodore VR
3	(Australia) Steve Reed (Australia) Trevor Ashby	Lansvale Smash Repairs (Dulux ICI Autocolor)	Holden Commodore VP	37	(Australia) Alan Taylor (Australia) Bill Attard (Australia) Stephen Bell	Alan Taylor Racing (The Xerox Shop)	Holden Commodore VP
4	(Australia) Brad Jones (Australia) Tony Scott	Wayne Gardner Racing (Coca-Cola)	Holden Commodore VR	38	(Australia) Mark Poole (Australia) Peter Gazzard	James Rosenberg Racing (Scott's Transport Mount Gambier)	Holden Commodore VR
05	(Australia) Peter Brock (Australia) Tomas Mezera	Holden Racing Team (Holden, Mobil 1)	Holden Commodore VR	39	(Australia) Chris Smerdon (Australia) Kevin Weeks (Australia) Adam Kaplan	Challenge Motorsport (Mitsubishi Electric)	Holden Commodore VR
6	(Australia) Mark Noske (Australia) Garry Waldon	Gibson Motorsport (Holden Network Q, Sega Saturn)	Holden Commodore VR	40	(Australia) Michael Hart (Australia) Peter Lawrence	Michael Hart Motorsport (unsponsored)	Holden Commodore VR
7	(Australia) Wayne Gardner (Australia) Neil Crompton	Wayne Gardner Racing (Coca-Cola)	Holden Commodore VR	41	(Australia) Garry Willmington (Australia) Bill Sieders	Willmington Performance (Willmington Performance)	Ford Falcon EB
9	(Germany) Klaus Niedzwiedz (Australia) Ken Douglas	Allan Moffat Racing (Cenovis, Banana Boat)	Ford Falcon EB	44	(Australia) Mal Rose (Australia) Terry Shiel	Mal Rose Racing (Fairfax Community Classifieds)	Holden Commodore VR
10	(Australia) Mark Larkham (Australia) Cameron McConville	Larkham Motorsport (Mitre 10)	Ford Falcon EF	46	(New Zealand) John Faulkner (Australia) Steve Harrington	John Faulkner Racing (Betta Electrical, Fisher & Paykel)	Holden Commodore VR
11	(Australia) Larry Perkins (Australia) Russell Ingall	Perkins Engineering (Castrol)	Holden Commodore VP	47	(Australia) John Trimbole (Australia) David Attard	Daily Planet Racing (Daily Planet)	Ford Falcon EB
17	(Australia) Dick Johnson (Australia) John Bowe	Dick Johnson Racing (Shell, FAI Insurance)	Ford Falcon EF	49	(Australia) Greg Crick (Australia) David Parsons	Greg Crick Racing (Alcair Air Conditioning)	Holden Commodore VR
18	(Australia) Steven Johnson (United States) Tommy Kendall	Dick Johnson Racing (Shell, FAI Insurance)	Ford Falcon EF	50	(Australia) Peter McLeod (Australia) Ryan McLeod	McLeod Racing (Enzed Hoses and Fittings)	Holden Commodore VR
20	(Australia) Ian Palmer (Australia) Brett Peters	Palmer Promotions (unsponsored)	Holden Commodore VR	52	(Australia) Geoff Kendrick (Australia) Geoff Full	Kendrick Racing (92.9 PMFM)	Holden Commodore VR
25	(Australia) Tony Longhurst (Australia) Steven Ellery	Longhurst Racing (Castrol)	Ford Falcon EF	62	(Australia) Wayne Russell (Australia) Ric Shaw	Novocastrian Motorsport (Union Steel, Nokia)	Holden Commodore VP
27	(Australia) Terry Finnigan (Australia) Stuart McColl	Terry Finnigan Racing Team (Sony)	Holden Commodore VR	75	(Australia) Max Dumesny (Australia) Kerry Baily	John Sidney Racing (Autopro, Valvoline)	Ford Falcon EF
28	(Australia) Kevin Waldock (Australia) Wayne Park	Playscape Racing (Komatsu)	Ford Falcon EF	79	(Australia) Mike Conway (New Zealand) Miles Pope	Conway Racing (GlobalJig, Cadillac Film Productions)	Holden Commodore VP
29	(Australia) Peter Doulman (Australia) John Cotter	Doulman Automotive (Doulman Automotive)	Holden Commodore VP	201	(Australia) Paul Romano (Australia) Andrew Miedecke	Alan Jones Racing (Pack Leader)	Ford Falcon EF
30	(Australia) Glenn Seton (Australia) David Parsons	Glenn Seton Racing (Ford Credit)	Ford Falcon EF	301	(Australia) Alan Jones (Australia) Allan Grice	Alan Jones Racing (Pack Leader)	Ford Falcon EF

== Results ==
=== Top ten shootout ===
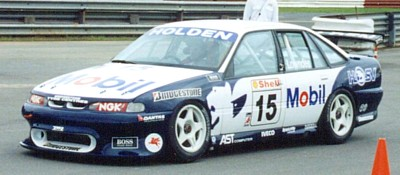
Craig Lowndes and Greg Murphy won the 1996 AMP Bathurst 1000 driving a Holden Racing Team-entered Holden VR Commodore similar to that pictured above

Pos	No	Entrant	Driver	Car	TT10	Qual
Pole	30	Ford Credit Racing	(Australia) Glenn Seton	Ford EF Falcon	2:11.0160	2:10.00
2	1	Holden Racing Team	(Australia) Craig Lowndes	Holden VR Commodore	2:11.4000	2:10.39
3	301	Pack Leader Racing	(Australia) Alan Jones	Ford EF Falcon	2:11.7727	2:12.42
4	05	Holden Racing Team	(Australia) Peter Brock	Holden VR Commodore	2:11.8164	2:10.98
5	7	Coca-Cola Racing	(Australia) Wayne Gardner	Holden VR Commodore	2:12.0783	2:11.69
6	46	Betta Electrical / Fisher & Paykel	(New Zealand) John Faulkner	Holden VR Commodore	2:12.1418	2:12.46
7	11	Castrol Perkins Racing	(Australia) Larry Perkins	Holden VP Commodore	2:12.3123	2:12.24
8	25	Castrol Longhurst Ford	(Australia) Tony Longhurst	Ford EF Falcon	2:12.3157	2:12.02
9	2	Gibson Team Sega	(Australia) Mark Skaife	Holden VR Commodore	2:12.3485	2:11.24
10	17	Shell FAI Racing	(Australia) Dick Johnson	Ford EF Falcon	2:12.4699	2:12.00

=== Race ===
Pos	No	Entrant	Drivers	Car	Laps	Qual Pos	Shootout Pos
1	1	Holden Racing Team	(Australia) Craig Lowndes (New Zealand) Greg Murphy	Holden VR Commodore	161	2	2
2	17	Shell FAI Racing	(Australia) Dick Johnson (Australia) John Bowe	Ford EF Falcon	161	6	10
3	25	Castrol Longhurst Ford	(Australia) Tony Longhurst (Australia) Steven Ellery	Ford EF Falcon	161	7	8
4	7	Coca-Cola Racing	(Australia) Wayne Gardner (Australia) Neil Crompton	Holden VR Commodore	160	5	5
5	05	Holden Racing Team	(Australia) Peter Brock (Australia) Tomas Mezera	Holden VR Commodore	160	3	4
6	11	Castrol Perkins Racing	(Australia) Larry Perkins (Australia) Russell Ingall	Holden VP Commodore	160	8	7
7	2	Gibson Team Sega	(Australia) Mark Skaife (United Kingdom) John Cleland	Holden VR Commodore	159	4	9
8	18	Shell FAI Racing	(Australia) Steven Johnson (United States) Tommy Kendall	Ford EF Falcon	158	12	
9	6	Gibson Team Sega	(Australia) Garry Waldon (Australia) Mark Noske	Holden VR Commodore	158	18	
10	9	Allan Moffat Enterprises	(Germany) Klaus Niedzwiedz (Australia) Ken Douglas	Ford EB Falcon	157	25	
11	201	Pack Leader Racing	(Australia) Paul Romano (Australia) Andrew Miedecke	Ford EF Falcon	156	14	
12	75	John Sidney Racing	(Australia) Max Dumesny (Australia) Kerry Baily	Ford EF Falcon	156	23	
13	29	M3 Motorsport	(Australia) Peter Doulman (Australia) John Cotter	Holden VP Commodore	154	20	
14	39	Chris Smerdon	(Australia) Chris Smerdon (Australia) Kevin Weeks (Australia) Adam Kaplan	Holden VR Commodore	154	28	
15	30	Ford Credit Racing	(Australia) Glenn Seton (Australia) David Parsons	Ford EF Falcon	152	1	1
16	20	Palmer Promotions	(Australia) Ian Palmer (Australia) Brett Peters	Holden VR Commodore	151	30	
17	36	Everlast Automotive Service	(Australia) Bill O'Brien (Australia) Brian Callaghan Jr (Australia) Ron Barnacle	Holden VR Commodore	150	29	
18	37	The Xerox Shop	(Australia) Alan Taylor (Australia) Stephen Bell (Australia) Bill Attard	Holden VP Commodore	146	33	
19	79	Cadillac Productions	(Australia) Mike Conway (New Zealand) Miles Pope	Holden VP Commodore	142	34	
20	38	Scotts Transport	(Australia) Mark Poole (Australia) Peter Gazzard	Holden VR Commodore	141	22	
21	3	Lansvale Smash Repairs	(Australia) Steve Reed (Australia) Trevor Ashby	Holden VP Commodore	126	16	
22	41	Garry Willmington	(Australia) Garry Willmington (Australia) Bill Sieders	Ford EB Falcon	124	35	
DNF	49	Alcair Airconditioning	(Australia) Greg Crick (Australia) David Parsons	Holden VP Commodore	139	17	
DNF	44	Mal Rose	(Australia) Mal Rose (Australia) Terry Shiel	Holden VR Commodore	132	26	
DNF	46	John Faulkner Racing	(New Zealand) John Faulkner (Australia) Steve Harrington	Holden VR Commodore	119	10	6
DNF	52	Geoff Kendrick	(Australia) Geoff Kendrick (Australia) Geoff Full	Holden VR Commodore	99	31	
DNF	50	Enzed	(Australia) Ryan McLeod (Australia) Peter McLeod	Holden VR Commodore	85	27	
DNF	28	Playscape Racing	(Australia) Kevin Waldock (Australia) Wayne Park	Ford EF Falcon	78	21	
DNF	27	Sony Autosound	(Australia) Terry Finnigan (Australia) Stuart McColl	Holden VP Commodore	37	19	
DNF	32	Garry Rogers Motorsport	(New Zealand) Steven Richards (New Zealand) Jim Richards	Holden VR Commodore	33	15	
DNF	301	Pack Leader Racing	(Australia) Alan Jones (Australia) Allan Grice	Ford EF Falcon	25	9	3
DNF	4	Coca-Cola Racing	(Australia) Brad Jones (Australia) Tony Scott	Holden VR Commodore	23	13	
DNF	62	Nokia / Union Steel	(Australia) Wayne Russell (Australia) Ric Shaw	Holden VP Commodore	4	32	
DNF	47	Daily Planet Melbourne P/L	(Australia) John Trimbole (Australia) David Attard	Ford EB Falcon	4	24	
DNF	10	Mitre 10 Racing	(Australia) Mark Larkham (Australia) Cameron McConville	Ford EF Falcon	3	11	
DNS	40	Michael Hart	(Australia) Michael Hart (Australia) Peter Lawrence	Holden VR Commodore			

== Statistics ==
- Provisional Pole Position – #30 Glenn Seton – 2:10.0077
- Pole Position – #30 Glenn Seton – 2:11.0160
- Fastest Lap – #1 Craig Lowndes – 2:13.1636 - Lap 149
- Winners' Average Speed – 139.75 km/h
- Race Time - 7:09:28.3584

== Broadcast ==
Channel Seven broadcast the race. Richard Hay and Mark Oastler spent time in both the booth and pit lane as part of the broadcast. This was the last time they broadcast the V8 race until they regained the rights in 2007.

Channel 7
Host: Garry Wilkinson, David Fordham
Booth: Garry Wilkinson, Mark Oastler, Allan Moffat, Charlie O'Brien, Richard Hay
Pit-lane: Andy Raymond

== See also ==
1996 Australian Touring Car season
