= 1995 Tooheys 1000 =

Motor race in Australia

Seasons
- ← 1994 1996 →

Layout of the Mount Panorama Circuit

The 1995 Tooheys 1000 was the 36th running of the Bathurst 1000 touring car race. It was held on 1 October 1995, at the Mount Panorama Circuit just outside Bathurst. The race was held for cars eligible under CAMS Group 3A 5.0 Litre Touring Car regulations, that later became known as V8 Supercars. This was the first Bathurst 1000 to be contested by single class.

== Overview ==
With only 32 cars on the starting grid it was the smallest field so far in the race's history. This was attributed to the fact that the race was run only for the outright class 5.0 Litre Touring Cars with no small car categories running for the first time in the history of the race going back to the 1960 Armstrong 500 at Phillip Island in Victoria.

Larry Perkins and Russell Ingall driving the #11 Castrol Commodore won the 1995 Tooheys 1000 in what was almost a last to first effort. Perkins clashed with the slow starting HRT Commodore of pole sitter Craig Lowndes before the first turn which pulled the valve out of a tyre forcing him to fall from third to second last on the first lap before pitting to replace the tyre. (The car credited by the official lap score with being in last place on the first lap was Russell/Shaw Commodore, which had pitted after the parade lap having broken the rear suspension. The car was repaired and they eventually came from last to finish 15th). The duo started to climb back up into contention, helped by cars ailing to go the race distance and Safety car periods including once after having just un-lapped themselves and were back in the top 5 with 20 laps to go.

Following the last Safety car, Perkins set about hauling in the leaders. He passed Brad Jones's Coke Commodore and the Peter Jackson Falcon of Alan Jones to move into second place about 7 seconds behind the Falcon of Jones' team leader Glenn Seton. Then going across the top of the mountain on lap 151, Seton's engine, built by the teams chief engine builder and Glenn's dad Barry Seton dropped a valve. Going into Murray's Corner Perkins had caught up to Seton and passed him for the lead. Perkins went on to win a famous victory while Seton's race ended less than half a lap later, the Falcon coming to a stop on the climb to the Cutting. In a show of courage, an obviously gutted Seton conducted an interview on Racecam with Channel 7 showing graciousness in defeat while the race continued with cameras in the pits showing his father Bo, head in hands not wanting to believe the race was lost after they were so close to winning.

== Entry list ==
No.	Drivers	Team (Sponsor)	Car	No.	Drivers	Team (Sponsor)	Car
1	(Australia) Mark Skaife (New Zealand) Jim Richards	Gibson Motorsport (Winfield)	Holden Commodore VR	25	(Australia) Tony Longhurst (Australia) Wayne Park	Longhurst Racing (Castrol)	Ford Falcon EF
2	(New Zealand) Steven Richards (Sweden) Anders Olofsson	Gibson Motorsport (Winfield)	Holden Commodore VR	27	(Australia) Terry Finnigan (Australia) Peter Gazzard	Terry Finnigan Racing Team (Sony Autosound)	Holden Commodore VP
3	(Australia) Steve Reed (Australia) Trevor Ashby	Lansvale Smash Repairs (Dulux ICI Autocolor)	Holden Commodore VP	28	(Australia) Kevin Waldock (Australia) Mark McLaughlin	Playscape Racing (Komatsu)	Ford Falcon EF
4	(Australia) Brad Jones (United Kingdom) Win Percy	Wayne Gardner Racing (Coca-Cola)	Holden Commodore VR	30	(Australia) Glenn Seton (Australia) David Parsons	Glenn Seton Racing (Peter Jackson)	Ford Falcon EF
05	(Australia) Peter Brock (Australia) Tomas Mezera	Holden Racing Team (Holden, Mobil 1)	Holden Commodore VR	33	(Australia) Bob Pearson (Australia) Bruce Stewart	Pro-Duct Motorsport (Pro-Duct Air Conditioning)	Holden Commodore VP
7	(Australia) Wayne Gardner (Australia) Neil Crompton	Wayne Gardner Racing (Coca-Cola)	Holden Commodore VR	35	(Australia) Alan Jones (Australia) Allan Grice	Glenn Seton Racing (Peter Jackson)	Ford Falcon EF
9	(Australia) Andrew Miedecke (Australia) Mark Noske	Allan Moffat Racing (Cenovis)	Ford Falcon EB	36	(Australia) Neil Schembri (Australia) Graham Moore	Merlin Motorsport (Awesome OZ Promotions)	Holden Commodore VR
10	(Australia) Mark Larkham (Australia) Warwick Rooklyn	Larkham Motorsport (Mitre 10)	Ford Falcon EF	37	(Australia) Alan Taylor (Australia) Roger Hurd (Australia) Stephen Bell	Alan Taylor Racing (The Xerox Shop)	Holden Commodore VP
11	(Australia) Larry Perkins (Australia) Russell Ingall	Perkins Engineering (Castrol)	Holden Commodore VR	38	(Australia) Mark Poole (Australia) Ed Ordynski (Australia) Bernie Stack	James Rosenberg Racing (Gawler Farm Machinery)	Holden Commodore VP
12	(Australia) Peter Doulman (Australia) John Cotter	Doulman Automotive (Australian College of Driving)	Holden Commodore VP	39	(Australia) Bill O'Brien (Australia) Brian Callaghan, Jr. (Australia) Ron Barnacle	O'Brien Automotive (Everlast Automotive)	Holden Commodore VL
015	(Australia) Craig Lowndes (New Zealand) Greg Murphy	Holden Racing Team (Holden, Mobil 1)	Holden Commodore VR	49	(Australia) Greg Crick (Australia) David Attard	Greg Crick Racing (Alcair Air Conditioning)	Holden Commodore VP
17	(Australia) Dick Johnson (Australia) John Bowe	Dick Johnson Racing (Shell, FAI Insurance)	Ford Falcon EF	54	(New Zealand) Ed Lamont (Australia) Graham Gulson	Ed Lamont Racing (ACDelco)	Holden Commodore VP
18	(Australia) Charlie O'Brien (Australia) Steven Johnson	Dick Johnson Racing (Shell, FAI Insurance)	Ford Falcon EF	55	(Australia) David Parsons (Australia) Rodney Crick	Parsons Transport (Parsons Transport)	Holden Commodore VR
20	(Australia) Ian Palmer (Australia) Brett Peters	Palmer Promotions (Hungry Jack's)	Holden Commodore VR	60	(Australia) Peter McLeod (Australia) Ryan McLeod	McLeod Racing (Enzed Hoses and Fittings)	Holden Commodore VR
21	(United Kingdom) John Cleland (Australia) Tony Scott	Pinnacle Motorsport (Pinnacle Motorsport)	Holden Commodore VR	62	(Australia) Wayne Russell (Australia) Ric Shaw	Novocastrian Motorsport (Roadchill Express, Union Steel)	Holden Commodore VP
24	(Australia) Paul Romano (Australia) Troy Dunstan	Romano Racing (Beaumont Tiles)	Holden Commodore VP	74	(Australia) Kevin Heffernan (Australia) Stephen Voight	PACE Racing (Price Attack)	Holden Commodore VP

== Results ==
=== Top 10 shootout ===
Pos	No	Team	Driver	Car	TT10	Qual
Pole	015	Holden Racing Team	(Australia) Craig Lowndes	Holden VR Commodore	2:11.5540	2:12.32
2	1	Winfield Racing	(Australia) Mark Skaife	Holden VR Commodore	2:11.9504	2:12.10
3	11	Castrol Perkins Racing	(Australia) Larry Perkins	Holden VR Commodore	2:12.4759	2:11.58
4	7	Coca-Cola Racing	(Australia) Wayne Gardner	Holden VR Commodore	2:12.5422	2:12.36
5	30	Peter Jackson Racing	(Australia) Glenn Seton	Ford EF Falcon	2:12.5438	2:11.60
6	35	Peter Jackson Racing	(Australia) Alan Jones	Ford EF Falcon	2:12.7075	2:12.79
7	18	Shell FAI Racing	(Australia) Steven Johnson	Ford EF Falcon	2:13.1149	2:12.46
8	17	Shell FAI Racing	(Australia) Dick Johnson	Ford EF Falcon	2:13.1854	2:11.90
9	25	Castrol Longhurst Ford	(Australia) Tony Longhurst	Ford EF Falcon	2:13.8883	2:13.11
10	05	Holden Racing Team	(Australia) Peter Brock	Holden VR Commodore	DNF	2:12.03

* 1995 saw the first time a father and son both qualified for the shootout. Dick Johnson, competing in his 18th straight shootout, and his son Steven Johnson, in his first, qualified their Shell FAI Racing Ford EF Falcon's in 7th and 8th place, with the younger Johnson out qualifying his more experienced dad by 0.0705 seconds.
* Peter Brock crashed his Holden Racing Team VR Commodore at The Cutting during his lap, thus he did not record a time and would start 10th. His HRT teammate Craig Lowndes claimed his first Bathurst pole position with a time of 2:11.554. This was 0.766 seconds faster than his qualifying time of 2:12.32.
* Following a CAMS parity adjustment which saw a reduction in size to the front spoiler of the Ford EF Falcons which had dominated the 1995 ATCC, the Ford runners claimed that they were at least a second or more per lap slower than they would have been had they been able to run the originally homologated spoiler.

=== Race ===
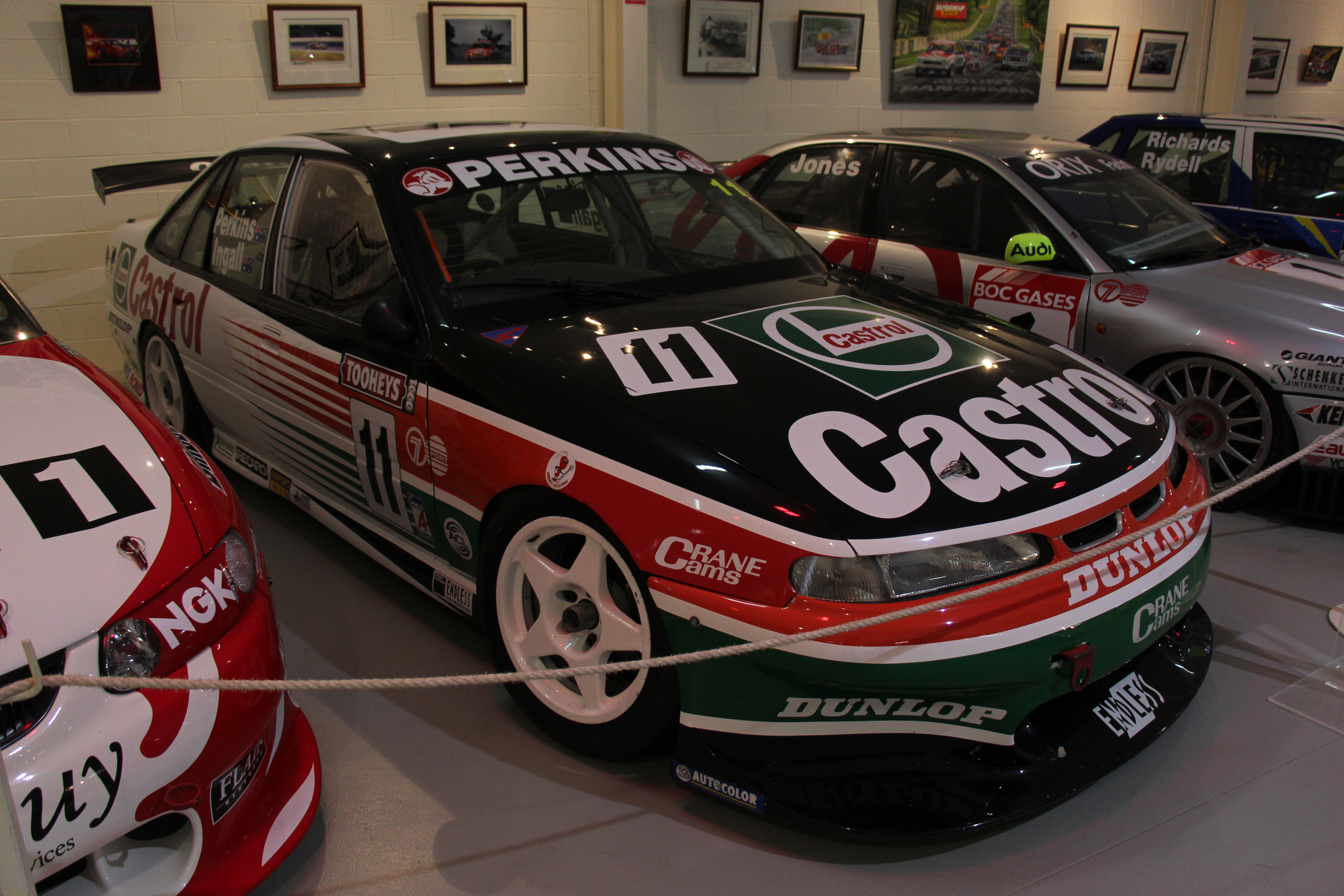
The race winning Holden VR Commodore of Larry Perkins and Russell Ingall, pictured in 2016

Pos	No	Team	Drivers	Car	Laps	Qual Pos	Shootout Pos
1	11	Castrol Perkins Racing	(Australia) Larry Perkins (Australia) Russell Ingall	Holden VR Commodore	161	1	3
2	35	Peter Jackson Racing	(Australia) Alan Jones (Australia) Allan Grice (Australia) David Parsons	Ford EF Falcon	161	9	6
3	7	Coca-Cola Racing	(Australia) Wayne Gardner (Australia) Neil Crompton	Holden VR Commodore	161	7	4
4	2	Winfield Racing	(Sweden) Anders Olofsson (New Zealand) Steven Richards	Holden VR Commodore	161	16	
5	4	Coca-Cola Racing	(Australia) Brad Jones (United Kingdom) Win Percy	Holden VR Commodore	161	11	
6	21	Pinnacle Motorsport	(Australia) Tony Scott (United Kingdom) John Cleland	Holden VR Commodore	158	13	
7	18	Shell FAI Racing	(Australia) Charlie O'Brien (Australia) Steven Johnson	Ford EF Falcon	158	8	7
8	28	Playscape Racing	(Australia) Kevin Waldock (Australia) Mark McLaughlin	Ford EF Falcon	152	24	
9	25	Castrol Longhurst Ford	(Australia) Tony Longhurst (Australia) Wayne Park	Ford EF Falcon	149	10	9
10	39	Bill O'Brien	(Australia) Bill O'Brien (Australia) Brian Callaghan Jr (Australia) Ron Barnacle	Holden VL Commodore SS Group A SV	149	30	
11	37	Scotty Taylor Racing	(Australia) Alan Taylor (Australia) Roger Hurd (Australia) Stephen Bell	Holden VP Commodore	146	31	
12	74	PACE Racing	(Australia) Kevin Heffernan (Australia) Stephen Voight	Holden VP Commodore	144	27	
13	54	Lamont Motor Sport NZ	(New Zealand) Ed Lamont (Australia) Graham Gulson	Holden VP Commodore	143	26	
14	49	Alcair Racing	(Australia) David Attard (Australia) Greg Crick	Holden VP Commodore	130	14	
15	62	Novacastrian Motorsport	(Australia) Wayne Russell (Australia) Ric Shaw	Holden VP Commodore	129	29	
DNF	30	Peter Jackson Racing	(Australia) Glenn Seton (Australia) David Parsons (Australia) Allan Grice	Ford EF Falcon	152	2	5
DNF	38	James Rosenberg Racing	(Australia) Mark Poole (Australia) Ed Ordynski (Australia) Bernie Stack	Holden VP Commodore	136	25	
DNF	3	Lansvale Racing Team	(Australia) Steve Reed (Australia) Trevor Ashby	Holden VP Commodore	132	15	
DNF	55	David Parsons	(Australia) David Parsons (Australia) Rodney Crick	Holden VR Commodore	127	17	
NC	24	Romano Racing	(Australia) Paul Romano (Australia) Troy Dunstan	Holden VP Commodore	113	21	
DNF	17	Shell FAI Racing	(Australia) Dick Johnson (Australia) John Bowe	Ford EF Falcon	110	3	8
DNF	33	Pro-Duct Motorsport	(Australia) Bob Pearson (Australia) Bruce Stewart	Holden VP Commodore	88	19	
DNF	1	Winfield Racing	(Australia) Mark Skaife (New Zealand) Jim Richards	Holden VR Commodore	65	5	2
DNF	27	Terry Finnigan	(Australia) Terry Finnigan (Australia) Peter Gazzard	Holden VP Commodore	54	22	
DNF	12	M3 Motorsport	(Australia) Peter Doulman (Australia) John Cotter	Holden VP Commodore	40	20	
DNF	20	Palmer Promotions	(Australia) Ian Palmer (Australia) Brett Peters	Holden VR Commodore	38	28	
DNF	05	Holden Racing Team	(Australia) Peter Brock (Australia) Tomas Mezera	Holden VR Commodore	32	4	10
DNF	10	Larkham Motor Sport	(Australia) Mark Larkham (Australia) Warwick Rooklyn	Ford EF Falcon	22	12	
DNF	36	Schembri Motorsport	(Australia) Neil Schembri (Australia) Graham Moore	Holden VR Commodore	19	23	
DNF	9	Allan Moffat Enterprises	(Australia) Andrew Miedecke (Australia) Mark Noske	Ford EB Falcon	16	18	
DNF	015	Holden Racing Team	(Australia) Craig Lowndes (New Zealand) Greg Murphy	Holden VR Commodore	10	6	1
DNF	60	Enzed Racing	(Australia) Ryan McLeod (Australia) Peter McLeod	Holden VR Commodore	0	32	

== Statistics ==
- Provisional Pole Position – #11 Larry Perkins – 2:11.5764
- Pole Position – #015 Craig Lowndes – 2:11.5540
- Fastest Lap – #015 Craig Lowndes – 2:14.3239 - Lap 8
- Average Speed – 157.72 km/h
- Race Time - 6:20:32.3766

== Broadcast ==
Channel Seven broadcast the race. This was Mike Raymond's last Bathurst 1000 with his contract with Channel Seven not renewed for 1996. Richard Hay and Mark Oastler spent time in both the booth and pit lane as part of the broadcast.

Channel 7
Host: Bruce McAvaney
Booth: Mike Raymond, Garry Wilkinson, Mark Oastler, Allan Moffat, Richard Hay
Pit-lane: Andy Raymond

== See also ==
1995 Australian Touring Car season
