= 1994 Tooheys 1000 =

Motor race in Australia

Seasons
- ← 1993 1995 →

Layout of the Mount Panorama Circuit

The 1994 Tooheys 1000 was a motor race held on 2 October 1994 at the Mount Panorama Circuit near Bathurst in New South Wales, Australia. It was the 35th running of the Bathurst 1000 touring car race. The race was open to cars complying with CAMS Group 3A Touring Car regulations, later known as V8 Supercars and those complying with FIA Class II Touring Car regulations, later known as Super Touring cars. In the lead up to the 2003 event, Wheels Magazine voted the 1994 Bathurst 1000 to be the greatest of all time.

The race was won by Dick Johnson and John Bowe in their Dick Johnson Racing entered Ford EB Falcon, with the latter driver holding off a late-race challenge from then-rookie Craig Lowndes in a Holden Racing Team entered VP Commodore he shared with Brad Jones, which eventually finished second. Larry Perkins and Gregg Hansford were third in their Holden VP Commodore entered by Perkins Engineering. The 1994 Tooheys 1000 was the first to be won by the Ford Falcon since the 1981 James Hardie 1000.

== Entry list ==
No.	Class	Drivers	Team (Sponsor)	Car	No.	Class	Drivers	Team (Sponsor)	Car
1	A	(Australia) Glenn Seton (New Zealand) Paul Radisich	Glenn Seton Racing (Peter Jackson)	Ford Falcon EB	35	A	(Australia) Richard Wilson (Australia) Troy Nicholson (Australia) Ric Shaw	Steven McLaine Motorsport (Quick-Fit Mufflers, Brakes & Suspension)	Holden Commodore VP
2	A	(Australia) Mark Skaife (New Zealand) Jim Richards	Gibson Motorsport (Winfield)	Holden Commodore VP	36	A	(Australia) Neil Schembri (Australia) Rodney Crick	Schembri Motorsport (BetterGrow)	Holden Commodore VP
3	A	(Australia) Steve Reed (Australia) Trevor Ashby	Lansvale Smash Repairs (Dulux ICI Autocolor)	Holden Commodore VP	37	A	(Australia) Alan Taylor (Australia) Roger Hurd (Australia) Stephen Bell	Alan Taylor Racing (The Xerox Shop)	Holden Commodore VL
4	A	(Australia) Wayne Gardner (Australia) Neil Crompton	Wayne Gardner Racing (Coca-Cola)	Holden Commodore VP	38	A	(Australia) Barry Graham (Australia) Brian Callaghan, Jr.	O'Brien Automotive (Everlast Automotive)	Holden Commodore VL
05	A	(Australia) Peter Brock (Australia) Tomas Mezera	Holden Racing Team (Holden, Mobil 1, Telecom)	Holden Commodore VP	39	A	(Australia) Chris Smerdon (Australia) Cameron McConville	Challenge Motorsport (Andersen Consulting)	Holden Commodore VP
6	A	(Australia) Colin Bond (Sweden) Anders Olofsson	Gibson Motorsport (Winfield)	Holden Commodore VP	41	A	(Australia) Garry Willmington (Australia) Jeff Barnes	Willmington Performance (Willmington Performance, McLeod Ford)	Ford Falcon EB
7	A	(United Kingdom) Win Percy (Australia) Russell Ingall	Wayne Gardner Racing (Coca-Cola)	Holden Commodore VP	42	A	(Australia) Greg Fahey (Australia) Dennis Cribbin	Glenn Mason Motorsport (Bill Rimmelzwaan Homes)	Holden Commodore VL
8	B	(Australia) Steve Hardman (Australia) Geoff Full	Colin Bond Racing (Hyundai)	Hyundai Lantra Mk.1	44	A	(Australia) Mike Conway (Australia) George Ayoub	Group Motor Sport (Group Motor Sport)	Holden Commodore VL
9	A	(Australia) Andrew Miedecke (United Kingdom) Jeff Allam	Allan Moffat Racing (Cenovis)	Ford Falcon EB	45	B	(New Zealand) Craig Baird (New Zealand) Brett Riley	LoGaMo Racing (Diet Coke)	BMW 318i (E36)
10	A	(Australia) Phil Ward (Australia) Steven Ellery	Phil Ward Racing (Technophone Mobile Phones)	Holden Commodore VP	46	B	(Australia) Paul Morris (Germany) Altfrid Heger	LoGaMo Racing (Diet Coke)	BMW 318i (E36)
11	A	(Australia) Larry Perkins (Australia) Gregg Hansford	Perkins Engineering (Castrol)	Holden Commodore VP	47	A	(Australia) John Trimbole (Australia) Garry Waldon	Daily Planet Racing (Daily Planet)	Holden Commodore VP
12	A	(Australia) Bob Jones (Australia) Troy Dunstan	Bob Jones Racing (Ampol Max 3)	Holden Commodore VP	48	B	(Australia) Warwick Rooklyn (Australia) John Blanchard	LoGaMo Racing (Benson & Hedges)	BMW 318i (E36)
14	A	(Australia) Stuart McColl (Australia) Peter Gazzard	Stuart McColl Racing (Dairy Vale, Kartmania)	Holden Commodore VP	49	A	(Australia) Malcolm Stenniken (Australia) Brett Youlden	Malcolm Stenniken Racing (President Batteries)	Holden Commodore VL
015	A	(Australia) Brad Jones (Australia) Craig Lowndes	Holden Racing Team (Holden, Mobil 1, Telecom)	Holden Commodore VP	50	A	(Australia) Gregg Easton (Australia) Kevin Heffernan	Easton Motorsport (Price Attack, MJ Salon Systems)	Holden Commodore VL
16	B	(Australia) Peter McKay (Australia) Jamie Miller	Phil Ward Racing (Technophone Mobile Phones)	Mercedes-Benz 190E (W201)	51	B	(Australia) Andrew Reid (Australia) Melinda Price (Australia) Garry Jones	Inspired Racing (Tom Piper)	Toyota Corolla Mk.6
17	A	(Australia) Dick Johnson (Australia) John Bowe	Dick Johnson Racing (Shell, FAI Insurance)	Ford Falcon EB	52	B	(Australia) Peter Doulman (Australia) John Cotter	Doulman Automotive (Clark Sinks)	BMW M3 (E30)
18	A	(Australia) Allan Grice (Australia) Steven Johnson	Dick Johnson Racing (Shell, FAI Insurance)	Ford Falcon EB	54	A	(New Zealand) Ed Lamont (Australia) Graham Gulson	Pinnacle Motorsport (Shoreline Resorts Queensland)	Holden Commodore VP
20	A	(Australia) Ian Palmer (Australia) Brett Peters	Palmer Promotions (Olympus, Dogbone Hollow Flange Beam)	Holden Commodore VP	56	B	(New Zealand) Greg Murphy (United Kingdom) James Kaye	Bruce Miles Racing (Orix)	Toyota Carina Mk.10
24	A	(Australia) Greg Crick (Australia) Tony Scott	Pinnacle Motorsport (Shoreline Resorts Queensland)	Holden Commodore VP	57	B	(Australia) Bill Sieders (Australia) Allan Letcher	Darrell Dixon Racing (Dataliner Crash Repair Systems)	Peugeot 405
25	A	(Australia) Tony Longhurst (Australia) Charlie O'Brien	LoGaMo Racing (Benson & Hedges)	Holden Commodore VP	60	A	(Australia) Peter McLeod (Australia) Ryan McLeod (Australia) Kevin Burton	McLeod Racing (Enzed Hoses and Fittings)	Holden Commodore VL
26	A	(Australia) Don Watson (Australia) Ian Love	Don Watson Transport (Don Watson Transport)	Holden Commodore VP	62	A	(Australia) Wayne Russell (New Zealand) Bernie Gillon	Novocastrian Motorsport (Roadchill, Union Steel, New FM)	Holden Commodore VL
27	A	(Australia) Terry Finnigan (Australia) Steve Williams	Terry Finnigan Racing Team (Bobby McGee's)	Holden Commodore VP	89	B	(Australia) Ken Mathews (Australia) Matthew Martin	Phoenix Motorsport (Ultra Tune)	Peugeot 405
28	A	(Australia) Kevin Waldock (Australia) Mike Preston	Playscape Racing (Komatsu, Cummins)	Ford Falcon EB	98	B	(Australia) Peter Hills (Australia) Dennis Rogers	Knight Racing (Agip)	Ford Sierra
30	A	(Australia) Alan Jones (Australia) David Parsons	Glenn Seton Racing (Peter Jackson)	Ford Falcon EB					

Icon	Class
A	Class A
B	Class B

- Entry list at the start of Practice One. Kevin Heffernan was entered in Car #50 but moved across to Car #44 prior to the race.

=== Class A ===
For 5.0 litre cars, later to become known as V8 Supercars, it consisted of V8 engined Ford Falcons and Holden Commodores.

=== Class B ===
For 2.0 litre cars, later to become known as Super Touring cars, it consisted of BMW 318i, Hyundai Lantra, Peugeot 405, Toyota Carina, Toyota Corolla, a modified DTM Mercedes-Benz 190E and older modified Group A BMW M3s and Ford Sierras.

== Results ==
=== Top 10 shootout ===
The Tooheys Top Ten was restricted to the top ten cars from Qualifying. The results of this runoff determined the first ten places on the grid for the race. Additional prize money was paid to all entries in the Tooheys Top Ten.

Pos	No	Team	Driver	Car	TT10	Qual
Pole	1	Peter Jackson Racing	(Australia) Glenn Seton	Ford EB Falcon	2:12.1464	2:12.03
2	05	Holden Racing Team	(Australia) Peter Brock	Holden VP Commodore	2:12.3639	2:12.99
3	2	Winfield Racing	(Australia) Mark Skaife	Holden VP Commodore	2:12.3646	2:12.36
4	25	Benson & Hedges Racing	(Australia) Tony Longhurst	Holden VP Commodore	2:12.7549	2:13.90
5	4	Coca-Cola Racing	(Australia) Wayne Gardner	Holden VP Commodore	2:12.9670	2:13.46
6	30	Peter Jackson Racing	(Australia) Alan Jones	Ford EB Falcon	2:13.1276	2:13.44
7	18	Shell-FAI Racing	(Australia) Allan Grice	Ford EB Falcon	2:13.1959	2:12.71
8	11	Castrol Perkins Racing	(Australia) Larry Perkins	Holden VP Commodore	2:13.2338	2:12.90
9	015	Holden Racing Team	(Australia) Brad Jones	Holden VP Commodore	2:13.5126	2:13.15
10	17	Shell-FAI Racing	(Australia) Dick Johnson	Ford EB Falcon	2:13.6164	2:12.43

* Glenn Seton took his first ever pole position at Bathurst in his Ford EB Falcon. It was also the first Ford V8 on pole at Bathurst since Allan Moffat put his XB Falcon on pole in 1976. All other Ford pole positions since then (1987, 1988, 1989, 1990 and 1992) had been achieved in the turbocharged 4 cyl Ford Sierra RS500.
* After having an earlier time disallowed in qualifying due to a technical infringement, Peter Brock, in his first race at Bathurst for a factory backed Holden team since 1986, then qualified 6th in his Holden Racing Team VP Commodore. He improved in the shootout to qualify second for his first front row start since claiming pole position in a Ford Sierra RS500 in 1989.
* Dick Johnson qualified for his 17th straight Top Ten runoff having been the only driver to compete in every one since its inception in 1978. After qualifying 3rd, Johnson fell to 10th after the shootout when he ran wide and hit the wall coming out of The Cutting causing large amounts of tyre smoke from the right rear for the rest of the lap, though his time was only 1/10th slower than the HRT Commodore of Brad Jones.
* 1986 and 1990 race winner Allan Grice, who missed the race in 1993, made his first start at Bathurst in a Ford after 19 starts for Holden (1973-1992) and one start in a Fiat 124 Sport in 1968. He qualified his Dick Johnson Racing EB Falcon in 7th in the shootout, faster than team leader Dick Johnson who ended up 10th.
* Tony Longhurst and Brad Jones both equalled the record for driving different makes of cars in the Top Ten shootout. Longhurst had previously qualified for Ford (1988-1990) and BMW (1992), while Jones had previously qualified in a Mitsubishi (1986) and a Ford (1989). Both qualified their respective Holden VP Commodores for the 1994 Tooheys Top Ten. The record had been held solely by 1976 race winner Bob Morris who had qualified in the Top Ten for Holden (1978, 1979, 1983), Ford (1980, 1981, 1982) and Mazda (1984).

=== Race ===
Pos	Class	No	Team	Drivers	Car	Laps	Qual Pos	Shootout Pos
1	A	17	Shell-FAI Racing	(Australia) Dick Johnson (Australia) John Bowe	Ford EB Falcon	161	3	10
2	A	015	Holden Racing Team	(Australia) Brad Jones (Australia) Craig Lowndes	Holden VP Commodore	161	7	9
3	A	11	Castrol Perkins Racing	(Australia) Larry Perkins (Australia) Gregg Hansford	Holden VP Commodore	161	5	8
4	A	25	Benson & Hedges Racing	(Australia) Tony Longhurst (Australia) Charlie O'Brien	Holden VP Commodore	161	10	4
5	A	7	Coca-Cola Racing	(United Kingdom) Win Percy (Australia) Russell Ingall	Holden VP Commodore	161	11	
6	A	6	Winfield Racing	(Australia) Colin Bond (Sweden) Anders Olofsson	Holden VP Commodore	161	12	
7	A	18	Shell-FAI Racing	(Australia) Allan Grice (Australia) Steven Johnson	Ford EB Falcon	160	4	7
8	A	9	Allan Moffat Enterprises	(Australia) Andrew Miedecke (United Kingdom) Jeff Allam	Ford EB Falcon	157	16	
9	A	47	Daily Planet Racing	(Australia) John Trimbole (Australia) Garry Waldon	Holden VP Commodore	156	19	
10	B	46	Diet Coke Racing	(Australia) Paul Morris (Germany) Altfrid Heger	BMW 318i	155	31	
11	B	45	Diet Coke Racing	(New Zealand) Craig Baird (New Zealand) Brett Riley	BMW 318i	152	35	
12	B	48	Benson & Hedges Racing	(Australia) Warwick Rooklyn (Australia) John Blanchard	BMW 318i	152	32	
13	A	39	Challenge Motorsport	(Australia) Chris Smerdon (Australia) Cameron McConville	Holden VP Commodore	151	21	
14	A	20	Palmer Promotions	(Australia) Ian Palmer (Australia) Brett Peters	Holden VP Commodore	151	25	
15	A	36	Schembri Motorsport	(Australia) Neil Schembri (Australia) Rodney Crick	Holden VP Commodore	149	23	
16	A	12	Ampol Max 3 Racing	(Australia) Bob Jones (Australia) Troy Dunstan	Holden VP Commodore	148	17	
17	A	54	Ed Lamont	(New Zealand) Ed Lamont (Australia) Graham Gulson	Holden VP Commodore	146	22	
18	A	37	Scotty Taylor Racing	(Australia) Alan Taylor (Australia) Roger Hurd (Australia) Stephen Bell	Holden Commodore VL SS Group A SV	145	36	
19	B	52	M3 Motorsport	(Australia) Peter Doulman (Australia) John Cotter	BMW M3 2.0L	144	38	
20	A	38	Brian Callaghan	(Australia) Barry Graham (Australia) Brian Callaghan Jr	Holden Commodore VL SS Group A SV	143	29	
21	A	35	Steven McLaine Motorsport	(Australia) Richard Wilson (Australia) Troy Nicholson (Australia) Ric Shaw	Holden VP Commodore	143	27	
22	A	14	Stuart McColl	(Australia) Stuart McColl (Australia) Peter Gazzard	Holden VP Commodore	142	24	
23	B	56	Bruce Miles	(New Zealand) Greg Murphy (United Kingdom) James Kaye	Toyota Carina	136	33	
24	A	3	Lansvale Smash Repairs	(Australia) Steve Reed (Australia) Trevor Ashby	Holden VP Commodore	134	15	
25	B	16	Phil Ward Racing	(Australia) Peter McKay (Australia) Jamie Miller	Mercedes-Benz 190E	126	43	
26	A	44	Group Motorsport	(Australia) Mike Conway (Australia) George Ayoub (Australia) Kevin Heffernan	Holden Commodore VL SS Group A SV	123	37	
DNF	A	24	Pinnacle Motorsport	(Australia) Tony Scott (Australia) Greg Crick	Holden VP Commodore	158	14	
DNF	A	05	Holden Racing Team	(Australia) Peter Brock (Australia) Tomas Mezera	Holden VP Commodore	138	6	2
NC	A	41	Garry Willmington Performance	(Australia) Garry Willmington (Australia) Jeff Barnes	Ford EB Falcon	109	28	
NC	A	10	Phil Ward Racing	(Australia) Phil Ward (Australia) Steven Ellery	Holden VP Commodore	100	13	
DNF	A	4	Coca-Cola Racing	(Australia) Wayne Gardner (Australia) Neil Crompton	Holden VP Commodore	99	9	5
NC	A	42	Glenn Mason	(Australia) Greg Fahey (Australia) Dennis Cribbin	Holden Commodore VL SS Group A SV	97	42	
DNF	A	27	Terry Finnigan	(Australia) Terry Finnigan (Australia) Steve Williams	Holden VP Commodore	95	18	
DNF	A	60	Peter McLeod	(Australia) Ryan McLeod (Australia) Peter McLeod (Australia) Kevin Burton	Holden Commodore VL SS Group A SV	83	26	
DNF	A	1	Peter Jackson Racing	(Australia) Glenn Seton (New Zealand) Paul Radisich	Ford EB Falcon	82	1	1
DNF	A	62	Novacastrian Motorsport	(Australia) Wayne Russell (New Zealand) Bernie Gillon	Holden Commodore VL SS Group A SV	71	34	
DNF	B	57	Darrel Dixon	(Australia) Bill Sieders (Australia) Allan Letcher	Peugeot 405 Mi16	63	41	
DNF	A	30	Peter Jackson Racing	(Australia) Alan Jones (Australia) David Parsons	Ford EB Falcon	52	8	6
DNF	A	2	Winfield Racing	(Australia) Mark Skaife (New Zealand) Jim Richards	Holden VP Commodore	39	2	3
DNF	B	98	Knight Racing	(Australia) Peter Hills (Australia) Dennis Rogers	Ford Sierra	34	44	
DNF	B	8	Hyundai Automotive	(Australia) Steve Hardman (Australia) Geoff Full	Hyundai Lantra	26	45	
DNF	A	49	Malcolm Stenniken	(Australia) Brett Youlden (Australia) Malcolm Stenniken	Holden Commodore VL SS Group A SV	24	30	
DNF	A	28	Playscape Racing	(Australia) Kevin Waldock (Australia) Mike Preston	Ford EB Falcon	19	20	
DNF	B	89	Phoenix Motorsport	(Australia) Ken Mathews (Australia) Matthew Martin	Peugeot 405 Mi16	17	39	
DNF	B	51	Inspired Racing	(Australia) Andrew Reid (Australia) Melinda Price (Australia) Garry Jones	Toyota Corolla Seca	16	40	
DNS	A	26	Don Watson	(Australia) Don Watson^{1} (Australia) Ian Love	Holden VP Commodore			
DNS	A	50	Easton Motorsport	(Australia) Gregg Easton^{2} (Australia) Kevin Heffernan	Holden Commodore VL SS Group A SV			

Notes:

- ^1 - Don Watson was killed in an accident at the Chase during Thursday qualifying, which resulted in his entry being withdrawn from the race.
- ^2 - Greg Easton's car was badly damaged after an accident during Friday qualifying, and was subsequently withdrawn. Co-driver Kevin Heffernan was later moved into the #44 Holden Commodore VL SS Group A SV of Mike Conway & George Ayoub.

== Statistics ==
- Provisional Pole Position - #1 Glenn Seton - 2:12.0290
- Pole Position - #1 Glenn Seton - 2:12.1464
- Fastest Lap - #17 Dick Johnson - 2:14.1458 - Lap 108
- Winners' Race Time - 7:03:45.8425
- Winners' Average Speed - 142.63 km/h

== Broadcast ==
Channel Seven broadcast the race. Richard Hay and Mark Oastler spent time in both the booth and pit lane as part of the broadcast.

Channel 7
Host: Sandy Roberts
Booth: Mike Raymond, Garry Wilkinson, Mark Oastler, Allan Moffat, Richard Hay, Doug Mulray
Pit-lane: Andy Raymond

== See also ==
1994 Australian Touring Car season
