= Phil Ward Racing =

Australian motor racing team

- Manufacturer: Mercedes-Benz; Holden
- Team Principal: Phil Ward
- Race Drivers: Phil Ward (1987-90, 94-95); Lyndon Reithmuller (1987-88); David Clement (1988); John Goss (1990); Peter McKay (1994); Steven Ellery (1994); Jamie Miller (1994)
- Chassis: Mercedes-Benz 190E; Holden VP Commodore; Holden VR Commodore
- Debut: 1987

Phil Ward Racing was an Australian motor racing team that competed in touring car racing between 1987 and 1995. The race team would later become the organisation that created and ran the Aussie Racing Cars series.

== History ==
After racing for a number of years in Sports Sedans, most notably in his Chevrolet V8 powered Holden Monaro sponsored by Australian Playboy Magazine, in 1987, Phil Ward and fellow Sydney driver Lyndon Reithmuller purchased two Helmut Marko Mercedes-Benz 190Es imported into Australia for the 1986 Bathurst 1000, debuting at the 1987 Sandown 500. The team would compete primarily the East Coast rounds until the end of 1990, culminating in 12th outright and first in Class 2 at the 1990 Bathurst 1000 driving with two time race winner John Goss in what was Goss' 19th and last race at Bathurst before retiring.

Other than his class win in 1990, Phil Ward's most memorable moment in the Mercedes 190E was when he rolled the car in the sand trap at McPhillamy Park during the early laps of the 1988 Tooheys 1000 at Bathurst. Ward spent a number of laps digging the car out of the sand by hand before finally getting underway (with a little help from some sympathetic spectators who jumped the fence to help push the car out of the sand) and driving the car back to the pits.

The cars were then stored, before being reactivated to compete in the 1994 Australian 2 litre Championship with Technophone sponsorship. An ex Zakspeed 190E was purchased later in the year. At the 1994 Bathurst 1000, Ward debuted a Perkins Engineering built Holden Commodore VP.

In 1995, Phil Ward Racing raced in both the Super Touring and V8 series with Nokia sponsorship. The team made its final appearance at the 1995 Australian Grand Prix support race.
