= 1995 Australian Super Touring Championship =

1995 ASTC season

Seasons
- ← 1994 1996 →

The 1995 Australian Super Touring Championship was a CAMS sanctioned motor racing championship for 2 Litre Super Touring Cars. It was the third series for 2 litre Super Touring Cars to be contested in Australia, but the first to use the Australian Super Touring Championship name. It began on 5 March 1995 at Phillip Island Grand Prix Circuit and ended on 26 August at Eastern Creek Raceway after eight rounds.

The Drivers Championship was won by Paul Morris (BMW 318i), the Manufacturers Championship by BMW, the Teams Championship by BMW and the TOCA Privateers Cup by Graham Moore (Opel Vectra).

== Teams and drivers ==
The following teams and drivers competed in the 1995 Australian Super Touring Championship.

Team	Car	No.	Drivers	Rounds	Class
Diet Coke BMW Motorsport	BMW 318i	2	(Australia) Paul Morris		
Paul Nelson	BMW M3	3	(Australia) Paul Nelson		P
Ellery Motorsport	BMW 318i	4	(Australia) Steve Ellery		P
Phil Ward Team Nokia	Mercedes-Benz 190E	5	(Australia) Phil Ward		P
Orix Audi Sport Australia	Audi 80 Quattro	8	(New Zealand) Greg Murphy		
Volvo Cars Australia	Volvo 850 Estate	11	(Australia) Tony Scott		
Darrell Dixon	Peugeot 405 Mi16	12	(Australia) Ian Spurle		P
Bob Holden Motors	BMW M3	13	(Australia) Justin Mathews		P
Bob Holden Motors	BMW M3	16	(Australia) Paul Nelson (Australia) Bob Holden		P
Sentul Motorsport Team	Opel Vectra	14	(Australia) Graham Moore		P
International Motorsport	BMW 318i	15	(Australia) Charlie O'Brien		P
Orix Audi Sport Australia	Audi 80 Quattro	18	(Australia) Brad Jones		
Inspired Racing	Toyota Corolla Seca	26	(Australia) Melinda Price		
Garry Rogers Motorsport	Alfa Romeo 155 TS	34	(New Zealand) Steven Richards		P
Triple P Racing	BMW 318iS	58	(Australia) Paul Pickett		
Ross Palmer Motorsport	Ford Mondeo	70	(Australia) Gregg Hansford		
Ross Palmer Motorsport	Ford Mondeo	77	(New Zealand) Darren Palmer (United Kingdom) Jeff Allam (New Zealand) Jim Richards		
Bob Tweedie	Ford Sierra	79	(Australia) Bob Tweedie		P
Hyundai Automotive	Hyundai Lantra	80	(Australia) Steve Hardman		
Hyundai Automotive	Hyundai Lantra	81	(New Zealand) Jim Richards		
Diet Coke BMW Motorsport	BMW 318i	83	(Australia) Geoff Brabham		
Phoenix Motorsport	Peugeot 405 Mi16	95	(Australia) Geoff Full		P
Phoenix Motorsport	Peugeot 405 Mi16	96	(Australia) Mark Adderton (Australia) Warwick Rooklyn		P
Mark Seymour	BMW M3	97	(Australia) Mark Seymour		P
Knight Racing	Ford Sierra	98	(Australia) Peter Hills		P

Icon	Class
P Private Drivers	Private Drivers

== Results and standings ==
=== Race calendar and results ===
The 1995 Australian Super Touring Championship was contested over eight rounds with two races per round.

Round		Circuit	Date	Pole position	Fastest lap	Winning driver	Winning team
1	R1	(Australia) Phillip Island Grand Prix Circuit	5 March	(Australia) Paul Morris	(Australia) Brad Jones	(Australia) Paul Morris	(Australia) Diet Coke BMW Motorsport
1	R2	(Australia) Phillip Island Grand Prix Circuit	5 March		(Australia) Paul Morris	(Australia) Paul Morris	(Australia) Diet Coke BMW Motorsport
NC	R1	(Australia) Surfers Paradise Street Circuit	19 March	(Australia) Brad Jones	(Australia) Brad Jones	(Australia) Brad Jones	Audi Sport Australia
NC	R2	(Australia) Surfers Paradise Street Circuit	19 March		(Australia) Greg Murphy	(Australia) Greg Murphy	Audi Sport Australia
2	R1	(Australia) Oran Park Raceway	2 April	(Australia) Paul Morris	(Australia) Greg Murphy	(Australia) Greg Murphy	Audi Sport Australia
2	R2	(Australia) Oran Park Raceway	2 April		(Australia) Geoff Brabham	(Australia) Geoff Brabham	(Australia) Diet Coke BMW Motorsport
3	R1	(Australia) Symmons Plains Raceway	7 May	(Australia) Paul Morris	(New Zealand) Steven Richards	(Australia) Paul Morris	(Australia) Diet Coke BMW Motorsport
3	R2	(Australia) Symmons Plains Raceway	7 May		(Australia) Geoff Brabham	(Australia) Geoff Brabham	(Australia) Diet Coke BMW Motorsport
4	R1	(Australia) Calder Park Raceway	13 May	(Australia) Geoff Brabham	(Australia) Geoff Brabham	(Australia) Geoff Brabham	(Australia) Diet Coke BMW Motorsport
4	R2	(Australia) Calder Park Raceway	13 May		(Australia) Paul Morris	(Australia) Paul Morris	(Australia) Diet Coke BMW Motorsport
5	R1	(Australia) Mallala Motor Sport Park	4 June	(New Zealand) Steven Richards	(New Zealand) Steven Richards	(Australia) Geoff Brabham	(Australia) Diet Coke BMW Motorsport
5	R2	(Australia) Mallala Motor Sport Park	4 June		(Australia) Geoff Brabham	(Australia) Geoff Brabham	(Australia) Diet Coke BMW Motorsport
6	R1	(Australia) Lakeside International Raceway	23 July	(Australia) Geoff Brabham	(Australia) Geoff Brabham	(Australia) Paul Morris	(Australia) Diet Coke BMW Motorsport
6	R2	(Australia) Lakeside International Raceway	23 July		(Australia) Geoff Brabham	(Australia) Paul Morris	(Australia) Diet Coke BMW Motorsport
7	R1	(Australia) Winton Motor Raceway	13 August	(New Zealand) Steven Richards	(Australia) Paul Morris	(Australia) Paul Morris	(Australia) Diet Coke BMW Motorsport
7	R2	(Australia) Winton Motor Raceway	13 August		(Australia) Brad Jones	(Australia) Brad Jones	Audi Sport Australia
8	R1	(Australia) Eastern Creek Raceway	26 August	(Australia) Jim Richards	(Australia) Greg Murphy	(Australia) Brad Jones	Audi Sport Australia
8	R2	(Australia) Eastern Creek Raceway	26 August		(Australia) Paul Morris	(Australia) Paul Morris	(Australia) Diet Coke BMW Motorsport
NC	R1	(Australia) Calder Park Raceway	25 November	(Australia) Brad Jones	(Australia) Brad Jones	(Australia) Brad Jones	Audi Sport Australia
NC	R2	(Australia) Calder Park Raceway	25 November		(New Zealand) Steven Richards	(New Zealand) Steven Richards	(Australia) Garry Rogers Motorsport

== Championship standings ==
Points system
1st	2nd	3rd	4th	5th	6th	7th	8th	9th	10th
24	18	12	10	8	6	4	3	2	1

=== Drivers Championship ===
Pos	Driver	Car	PHI (Australia)		ORA (Australia)		SYM (Australia)		CAL (Australia)		MAL (Australia)		LAK (Australia)		WIN (Australia)		EAS (Australia)		Pts
1	(Australia) Paul Morris	BMW 318i	1	1	5	3	1	2	2	1	5	2	1	1	1	3	Ret	1	286
2	(Australia) Geoff Brabham	BMW 318i	6	3	2	1	2	1	1	2	1	1	2	11	3	2	3	Ret	232*
3	(Australia) Brad Jones	Audi 80 Quattro	2	2	4	4	5	6	5	4	2	3	3	2	2	1	1	2	232
4	(New Zealand) Greg Murphy	Audi 80 Quattro	3	Ret	1	5	Ret	3	4	5	4	4	5	3	DNS	DNS	2	Ret	132
5	(Australia) Graham Moore	Opel Vectra			7	6	4	7	7	7	6	5	8	5	8	5	5	5	84
6	(Australia) Steve Ellery	BMW 318i	5	Ret	Ret	DNS	3	4	10	11	3	6	6	7	4	7	6	Ret	79
7	(United Kingdom) Jeff Allam	Ford Mondeo			6	9	Ret	5	3	3	Ret	Ret	7	6	6	6			62
8	(Australia) Tony Scott	Volvo 850 Estate	4	4	8	Ret	Ret	Ret	8	6	7	Ret	9	10	10	10	7	3	57
9	(New Zealand) Steven Richards	Alfa Romeo 155 TS			9	7	Ret	Ret	6	Ret	Ret	Ret	4	4	7	4	4	Ret	56
10	(Australia) Charlie O'Brien	BMW 318i	Ret	Ret	3	2													30
11	(Australia) Mark Adderton	Peugeot 405 Mi16	Ret	DNS			6	8	9	8			11	9	9	8	9	Ret	23
12	(Australia) Paul Pickett	BMW 318iS	Ret	DNS			Ret	9	Ret	Ret	8	7	14	13	12	11	10	4	20
13	(Australia) Justin Mathews	BMW M3	7	5	11	11	8	11	12	9	Ret	9	15	12	13	12	11	Ret	19
14	(Australia) Geoff Full	Peugeot 405 Mi16											10	8	5	9	Ret	Ret	14
15	(Australia) Robert Tweedie	Ford Sierra	Ret	7	12	Ret	9	13	Ret	DNS			13	14	Ret	Ret	13	7	10
16	(Australia) Steve Hardman	Hyundai Lantra	Ret	8	Ret	Ret	7	10	Ret	10	Ret	DNS	12	Ret	11	Ret	12	Ret	9
17	(Australia) Paul Nelson	BMW M3	8	9	13	13	10	12	13	Ret			16	15	15	Ret	14	8	9
18	(New Zealand) Jim Richards	Ford Mondeo													DNS	DNS	8	6	9
19	(Australia) Mark Seymour	BMW M3	Ret	6	Ret	12			11	Ret									6
20	(Australia) Bob Holden	BMW M3									9	8							5
21	(Australia) Phil Ward	Mercedes-Benz 190E	Ret	Ret	Ret	8													3
22	(Australia) Peter Hills	Ford Sierra	Ret	10											14	13	15	9	3
23	(Australia) Ian Spurle	Peugeot 405 Mi16			10	Ret													1
24	(Australia) Warwick Rooklyn	Peugeot 405 Mi16			Ret	10													1
Pos	Driver	Car	PHI		ORA		SYM		CAL		MAL		LAK		WIN		EAS		Pts

Colour	Result
Gold	Winner
Silver	Second place
Bronze	Third place
Green	Points classification
Blue	Non-points classification
Blue	Non-classified finish (NC)
Purple	Retired, not classified (Ret)
Red	Did not qualify (DNQ)
Red	Did not pre-qualify (DNPQ)
Black	Disqualified (DSQ)
White	Did not start (DNS)
White	Withdrew (WD)
White	Race cancelled (C)
Blank	Did not practice (DNP)
Blank	Did not arrive (DNA)
Blank	Excluded (EX)

=== Manufacturers' Trophy ===
Pos	Manufacturer	Car	Points
1	(Germany) BMW	BMW 318i	386
2	(Germany) Audi	Audi 80 Quattro	294
3	(United States) Ford	Ford Mondeo	140
4	(Sweden) Volvo	Volvo 850 Estate	130
5	(South Korea) Hyundai	Hyundai Lantra	64

=== Teams' Trophy ===
Pos	Manufacturer	Points
1	Paul Morris Motorsport	552
2	Audi Sport	390
3	Bob Holden Motors	195
4	Phoenix Motorsport	68

=== TOCA Privateers' Cup ===
Position	Driver	Car	Points
1	Graham Moore	Opel Vectra	250
2	Steven Ellery	BMW 318i	212
3	Steven Richards	Alfa Romeo 155 TS	159
4	Justin Matthews	BMW M3	123
5	Mark Adderton	Peugeot 405 Mi16	98
6	Paul Pickett	BMW 318is	86
7	Paul Nelson	BMW M3	64
8	Robert Tweedie	Ford Sierra RS	55
9	Charlie O'Brien	BMW 318i	48
10	Geoff Full	Peugeot 405 Mi16	46
11	Mark Seymour	BMW M3	30
12	Peter Hills	Ford Sierra	24
13	Bob Holden	BMW M3	20
14	Phil Ward	Mercedes-Benz 190E	10
15	Ian Spurle	Peugeot 405 Mi16	10
16	Warwick Rooklyn	Peugeot 405 Mi16	8
17	Melinda Price	Toyota Corolla Seca	8

- Brabham: penalized 20 points for incident with Morris in race 9

== Championship name ==
The championship was promoted by TOCA Australia as the 1995 2.0 L Super Touring Championship but is recognized by the Confederation of Australian Motor Sport as the 1995 Australian Super Touring Championship.

== See also ==
1995 Australian Touring Car season
