= Graham Moore (racing driver) =

Australian racing driver

- Nationality: Australian
- Born: 4 January 1944 (age 82)

Australian Super Touring Championship
- Years active: 1995
- Teams: Sentul Motorsport Team
- Starts: 14
- Wins: 0
- Podiums: 0
- Fastest laps: 0
- Best finish: 5th in 1995

Previous series
- 1995: Australian Super Touring Championship

Graham Moore (born 4 January 1944) is a former Australian racing car driver. He competed in various Australian championships including the Australian Super Touring Championship, the Australian GT Production Car Championship, the Australian Nations Cup Championship and the Australian Touring Car Championship.

== Results ==
=== Bathurst 1000 results ===
Year	Team	Car	Co-driver	Position	Laps
1978	John Goss Pty Ltd	Ford XC Falcon GS500 Hardtop	(Australia) Rusty French	DNF	90
1979	Rusty French Racing	Ford XC Falcon GS500 Hardtop	(Australia) Rusty French	DNF	9
1980	Ron Dickson	Chevrolet Camaro Z28	(United States) Steve Dymand	25th	96
1982	King George Tavern	Ford XE Falcon	(Australia) Joe Moore	DNF	75
1983	King George Tavern	Ford XE Falcon	(Australia) Joe Moore	DNF	17
1984	Chequered Flag Magazine	Mazda RX-7	(Australia) Peter McKay	DNF	116
1985	Formula 1 Investments P/L	Mitsubishi Starion	(Belgium) Michel Delcourt	DNS	
1986	Formula 1 Investments P/L	Holden VK Commodore SS Group A SV	(Belgium) Michel Delcourt	7th	158
1987	Formula 1 Investments P/L	Holden VK Commodore SS Group A SV	(Belgium) Michel Delcourt	8th	152
1988	Formula 1 Investments	Holden VL Commodore SS Group A SV	(Australia) Tony Noske	DNF	79
1989	Mulvihill Motorsport	Holden VL Commodore SS Group A SV	(Australia) Tony Mulvihill (New Zealand) Glenn McIntyre	25th	133
1990	Garry Rogers Motorsport	Holden VL Commodore SS Group A SV	(Australia) Garry Rogers	DNF	0
1991	Perkins Engineering; Formula 1 Investments	Holden VL Commodore SS Group A SV	(Belgium) Michel Delcourt (Australia) Peter McKay	15th	136
1992	Bob Forbes Racing	Holden VN Commodore SS Group A SV	(Australia) Wayne Gardner	26th	119
1995	Schembri Motorsport	Holden VR Commodore	(Australia) Neil Schembri	DNF	19
1997	Williams Renault Dealer Racing	Renault Laguna	(Australia) Alan Jones	DNF	38
