= Charlie O'Brien (racing driver) =

Australian racing driver

- Nationality: Australian
- Born: 26 March 1955 (age 71)
- Relatives: Troy Dunstan (nephew); Shannon O'Brien (nephew)

V8 Utes
- Years active: 2010–11
- Starts: 46
- Wins: 3
- Poles: 1
- Fastest laps: 0
- Best finish: 12th in 2011

Previous series
- 1976–86 1982–83 1987 1995–96 2003–05 2004 2010–11: Australian Touring Car Champ. Australian Drivers' Champ. World Touring Car Championship; Australian Super Touring; Australian Carrera Cup; V8 Supercar; Australian V8 Ute Series

Championship titles
- 1987 1992: New Zealand Touring Car National Series; Bathurst 12 Hour

Charles Lindsay O'Brien (born 26 March 1955) is an Australian former race car driver. From 1976 to 2003, he held the record for being the youngest winner of an Australian Touring Car Championship round.

== Career results ==
Season	Title	Position	Car	Team
1976	Australian Touring Car Championship	6th	Holden LH Torana SLR/5000 L34	
1977	Australian Touring Car Championship	15th	Holden LH Torana SLR/5000 L34; Holden LX Torana SS A9X 4-Door	Holden Dealer Team
1978	Australian Touring Car Championship	19th	Holden LX Torana SS A9X Hatchback	Bob Forbes Motorsport
1979	Australian Touring Car Championship	5th	Holden LX Torana SS A9X 4-Door	Gown-Hindaugh; Roadways Racing
1980	Australian Touring Car Championship	10th	Holden VC Commodore	Roadways Racing
1982	Australian Drivers' Championship	5th	Ralt RT4 Ford	
1982	National Panasonic Series	1st	Ralt RT4	O'Brien's Heavy Haulage
1983	Australian Drivers' Championship	9th	Ralt RT4 Ford	
1983	North American Formula Atlantic Series	25th	Ralt RT4 Ford	Theodore Racing
1986	Australian Touring Car Championship	12th	BMW 635 CSi	Charlie O'Brien
1986	South Pacific Touring Car Championship	4th	BMW 635 CSi	Bob Jane T-Marts; State Coal BMW
1987	New Zealand Touring Car National Series	1st	BMW 635 CSi	
1995	Australian Super Touring Championship	10th	BMW 318i	Paul Morris Motorsport
1996	Australian Super Touring Championship	7th	BMW 318i	Paul Morris Motorsport
2003	Australian Carrera Cup Championship	17th	Porsche 996 GT3 Cup	
2004	Australian Carrera Cup Championship	16th	Porsche 996 GT3 Cup	
2004	V8 Supercar Championship Series	60th	Ford BA Falcon	WPS Racing
2005	Australian Carrera Cup Championship	25th	Porsche 996 GT3 Cup	
2010	Australian V8 Ute Series	14th	Ford Falcon XR8 Ute	Madashell Motorsport
2011	Australian V8 Ute Series	12th	Ford Falcon XR8 Ute	Rentco
2015	Australian Trans-Am Series	1st	Pontiac Trans-Am	Fataz Competition
2016	Australian Trans-Am Series	1st	Chevrolet Camaro	Fataz Competition

=== Complete Australian Touring Car Championship results ===
(key) (Races in bold indicate pole position) (Races in italics indicate fastest lap)

Year	Team	Car	1	2	3	4	5	6	7	8	9	10	11	12	13	DC	Points
1975	Charlie O'Brien	Holden LJ Torana GTR XU-1	SYM	CAL	AMA	ORA	SUR; 6	SAN	AIR	LAK; Ret						28th	1
1976	O'Brien's Transport	Holden LH Torana SL/R 5000 L34	SYM; 11	CAL; 6	ORA; 5	SAN	AMA; 1	AIR; 5	LAK; 3	SAN; 4	AIR; 3	SUR; 5	PHI; 2			6th	43
1977	Holden Dealer Team	Holden LH Torana SL/R 5000 L34 Holden LX Torana SS A9X 4-Door	SYM; 6	CAL; 5	ORA; 4	SAN; 5	AMA; 6	AIR	LAK	SAN; Ret	AIR	SUR	PHI; 8			15th	10
1978	Bob Forbes Motorsport	Holden LX Torana SS A9X Hatchback	SYM; 8	ORA	AMA	SAN	WAN	CAL; Ret	LAK; 3	AIR						19th	6
1979	Gown-Hindaugh Roadways Racing	Holden LX Torana SS A9X 4-Door	SYM	CAL	ORA; 5	SAN; 2	WAN	SUR; 2	LAK; 3	AIR						5th	26
1980	Roadways Racing	Holden VB Commodore	SYM	CAL	LAK	SAN	WAN	SUR; 2	AIR; 3	ORA						10th	15
1986	Charlie O'Brien	BMW 635 CSi	AMA; 5	SYM; Ret	SAN	AIR; 3	WAN	SUR; 5	CAL	LAK; 10	WIN	ORA				12th	56
2004	WPS Racing	Ford BA Falcon	ADE	ECR	PUK	HID	BAR	QLD	WIN	ORA	SAN; 16	BAT	SUR	SYM	ECR	60th	132

=== Complete World Touring Car Championship results ===
(key) (Races in bold indicate pole position) (Races in italics indicate fastest lap)

Year	Team	Car	1	2	3	4	5	6	7	8	9	10	11	DC	Points
1987	(Australia) Shell Ultra Hi-Tech Racing Team	Ford Sierra RS500	MNZ	JAR	DIJ	NUR	SPA	BNO	SIL	BAT; Ret	CLD ovr:13 cls:9			NC	0
1987	(New Zealand) Viacard Services	BMW 635 CSi										WEL ovr:20 cls:12	FJI	NC	0

† Not registered for series & points

=== Complete Bathurst 1000 results ===
Year	Team	Co-drivers	Car	Class	Laps	Pos.	Class pos.
1975	(Australia) C O'Brien	(Australia) Graham Ryan	Holden LH Torana SL/R 5000 L34	D	22	DNF	DNF
1976	(Australia) Holden Dealer Team	(Australia) Wayne Negus	Holden LH Torana SL/R 5000 L34	3001cc - 6000cc	160	4th	4th
1977	(Australia) Holden Dealer Team	(Australia) Ron Harrop	Holden LX Torana SS A9X 4-Door	3001cc - 6000cc	162	5th	5th
1978	(Australia) Holden Dealer Team	(Australia) John Harvey	Holden LX Torana SS A9X Hatchback	A	139	19th	9th
1979	(Australia) Roadways / Gown-Hindhaugh	(Australia) Garth Wigston	Holden LX Torana SS A9X Hatchback	A	147	8th	8th
1980	(Australia) Roadways / Gown-Hindhaugh	(Australia) Garth Wigston	Holden VC Commodore	3001-6000cc	157	5th	5th
1981	Citizen Watches Australia P/L	(Australia) Mike Quinn	Holden VC Commodore	8 Cylinder & Over	16	DNF	DNF
1982	(Australia) Soundwave Discos	(Australia) Clive Benson-Browne	Holden VH Commodore SS	A	143	DNF	DNF
1984	(Australia) Peter Williamson Toyota	(Australia) Peter Williamson	Toyota Celica Supra	Group A	0	DNF	DNF
1985	(Australia) Erle McRae Motorsport	(Australia) John English	BMW 635 CSi	C	106	DNF	DNF
1986	(Australia) / (West Germany) Goold Motorsport	(Australia) Garry Rogers	BMW 635 CSi	C	19	DNF	DNF
1987	(Australia) Shell Ultra Hi-Tech Racing Team	(New Zealand) Neville Crichton	Ford Sierra RS500	1	2	DNF	DNF
1989	(Australia) Miedecke Motorsport	(Australia) Andrew Miedecke	Ford Sierra RS500	A	0	DNF	DNF
1990	(Australia) Mobil 1 Racing	(Australia) Andrew Miedecke (Australia) David Parsons	Ford Sierra RS500	1	149	11th	11th
1991	(Australia) Allan Moffat Enterprises	(Italy) Gianfranco Brancatelli	Ford Sierra RS500	1	158	DSQ	DSQ
1992	(Australia) Allan Moffat Enterprises	(Australia) Gary Brabham	Ford Sierra RS500	A	124	25th	20th
1993	(Australia) Allan Moffat Enterprises	(Australia) Andrew Miedecke	Ford EB Falcon	A	41	DNF	DNF
1994	(Australia) Benson & Hedges Racing	(Australia) Tony Longhurst	Holden VP Commodore	A	161	4th	4th
1995	(Australia) Shell FAI Racing	(Australia) Steven Johnson	Ford EF Falcon		158	7th	7th
1997	(Australia) Castrol Longhurst Ford	(Australia) Tony Longhurst	Ford EL Falcon	L1	110	DNF	DNF

Sporting positions
Preceded by Allan Grice; Peter Fitzgerald; Nigel Arkell	Winner of the Bathurst 12 Hour; 1992 (with Garry Waldon & Mark Gibbs)	Succeeded by Alan Jones; Garry Waldon
