= Les May =

Australian rules footballer (born 1934)

Personal information
- Full name: Les May
- Born: 6 April 1934
- Original team: St Albans
- Height: 180 cm (5 ft 11 in)
- Weight: 72 kg (159 lb)

Playing career^{1}
Years	Club	Games (Goals)
1956	Geelong	4 (0)
- ^{1} Playing statistics correct to the end of 1956.

Les May (born 6 April 1934) is a former Australian rules footballer who played with Geelong in the Victorian Football League (VFL).
