= Andy Raymond =

Australian journalist

Andy Raymond is an Australian sports commentator, Event Host and Podcaster.

Born in Sydney, Andy Raymond is the son of former Channel 7 motor sports commentator Mike Raymond who was best known for his long time hosting of Seven's Australian Touring Car Championship and Bathurst 1000 telecasts from the 1970s to the mid-1990s as well as being the promoter and co-operator of the Liverpool Speedway in Sydney. He is also the nephew of former Channel 10 television host Steve Raymond.

Following his father and uncle into broadcast journalism, Raymond's first foray into the public eye came as a pit reporter at Bathurst during the early 1990s, taking over the role from Neil Crompton who at the time was concentrating more on his race driving than commentating.

During his tenure at 7 he also worked on golfing, swimming and tennis broadcasts as well as serving as sideline commentator in the inaugural Super Rugby competition.

In 1997 Raymond joined Fox Sports and apart from working on Fox Sports News he covered just about every sport in the country at one time or another in his 23 years there.

From 21 December 2002 to 2005 he promoted the annual Australian Wrestling Supershow on Fox Sport was held at the State Sports Centre.
