= David Attard =

Maltese advocate (born 1953)

David J. Attard
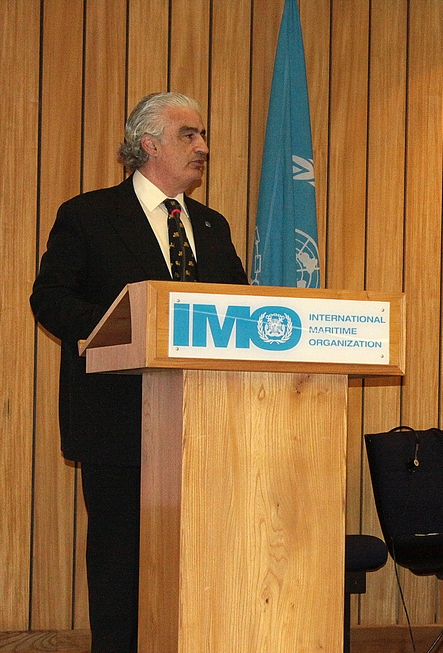
- David Attard in 2013.
- Born: 23 March 1953 (age 71); Sliema, Malta
- Education: University of Malta (LLD); Pembroke College, Oxford (DPhil)
- Occupation(s): advocate, lawyer and lecturer
- Title: Chancellor University of Malta
- Term: 2011

David Joseph Attard (born 23 March 1953) is a Maltese advocate, judge-barrister, member of the Middle Temple England and Wales and academic professor. He was pro-chancellor University of Malta in 2006 and chancellor since 2011.

Attard was born in Sliema, Malta. He qualified as a notary public at and holds an LL.D from the University of Malta. He earned a doctorate of law (D.Phil) at the University of Oxford (Pembroke College).

== Professional experience ==
He is experienced law teacher of the sea, associated professor in Law at the Malta University and became professor in International public law both in Malta University in 1988, he was head UNEP environmental diplomacy Mediterranean in academy of diplomatic studies, director IMO international maritime law institute, visiting professor of International Law, University of Rome Tor Vergata in 1994, senior visiting lecturer in College of Foreign Affairs, Beijing, research fellow at University of Oxford in 1998, scholar in Yale Law School and visiting professor at Université de Paris I- Panthéon Sorbonne.

Attard was Chairman of Exploration Committee in the Office of the Prime Minister of Malta in 1988, Advisor to the Secretary-general International Maritime Organization 1988-89, Special Legal Advisor to the Executive Director of the United Nations Environmental Programme in Nairobi 1989-91 and member of the Steering Committee for Human Rights (CDDH), Council of Europe, Strasbourg.

== Merit award ==
- Chevalier dans l’Ordre National de la Legion D’Honneur by President of the French Republic
- National Order of Merit by the President of Malta in 2009
- Orden de Isabel la Católica by the King of Spain in 2010.
- Order of Merit of the Italian Republic by the President of Italy.

== Book ==
- The Exclusive Economic Zone in International Law, Clarendon Press, A.J. David, and was granted the Paul Guggenheim award prize Geneva

== Publications ==
- David Joseph Attard; Malgosia Fitzmaurice; Norman A Martínez Gutiérrez; IMO International Maritime Law Institute, ISBN 9780199683925 OCLC 0199683921, Notes:"25th anniversary IMLI; supported by the Nippon Foundation
- David Joseph Attard; David M Ong; Malgosia Fitzmaurice; Alexandros XM Ntovas; Dino Kritsiotis, Oxford, United Kingdom: Oxford University Press, ISBN 9780198824152
- David Joseph Attard; Malgosia Fitzmaurice, Publisher: Oxford Oxford University. Press 2014 Series: IMLI manual on international maritime law / Ed. David Joseph Attard, vol-1. ISBN 9780199683925
