= Ford Falcon (EF) =

Australian full-size car

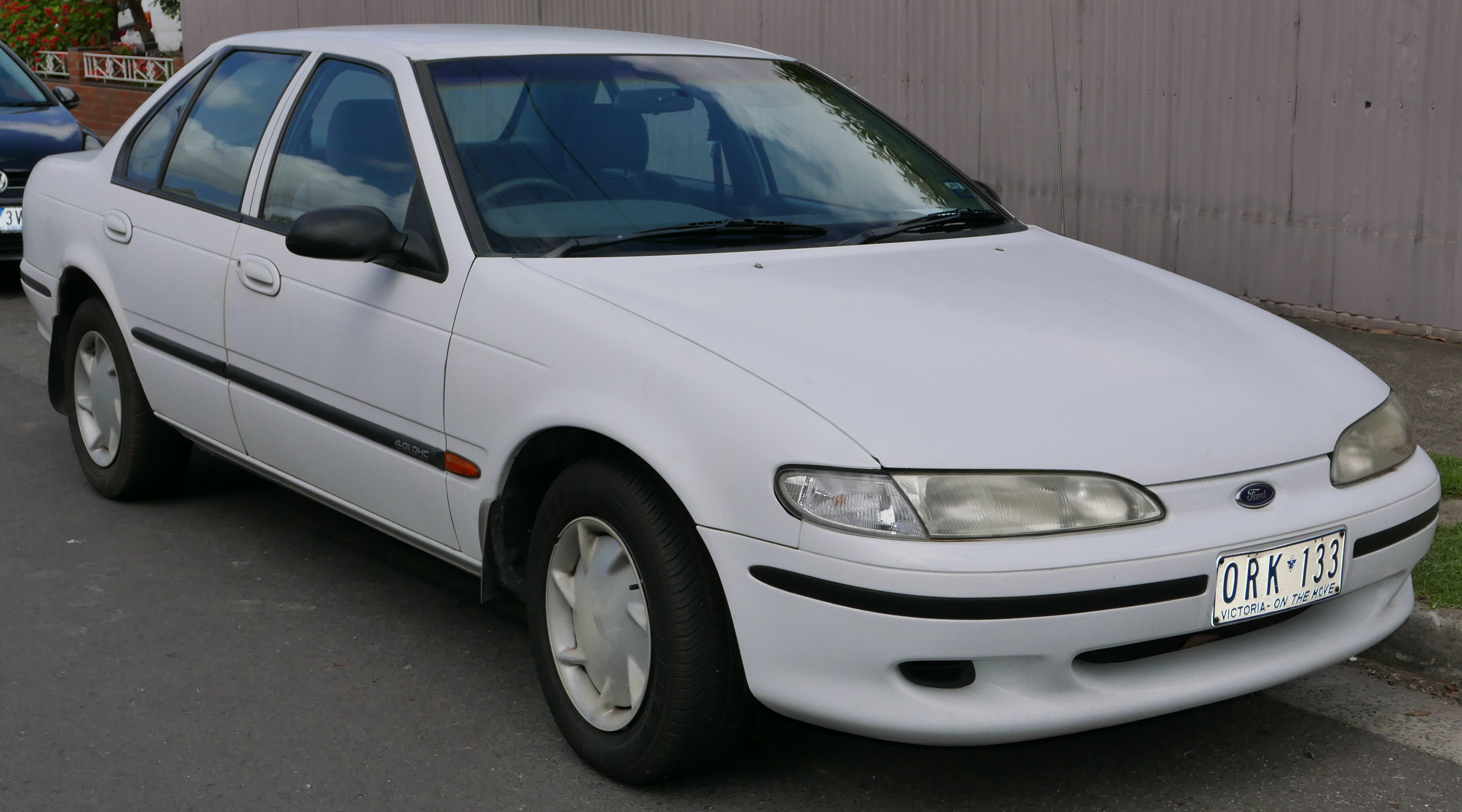
- Falcon GLi sedan

Overview
- Manufacturer: Ford Australia
- Also called: Ford Fairmont (EF)
- Production: August 1994 – October 1996
- Assembly: Australia: Melbourne, Victoria (Broadmeadows)

Body and chassis
- Class: Full-size car
- Body style: 4-door sedan 5-door station wagon
- Layout: FR layout
- Platform: EA77
- Related: Ford Fairlane (NF); Ford LTD (DF)

Powertrain
- Engine: 4.0 L Ford I6 (petrol); 5.0 L Windsor V8 (petrol)
- Transmission: 4-speed M93LE automatic (I6); 4-speed M97LE automatic (V8); 5-speed Tremec T-5 manual

Dimensions
- Wheelbase: 2,791 mm (109.9 in)
- Length: 4,906 mm (193.1 in)
- Width: 1,861 mm (73.3 in)
- Height: 1,453 mm (57.2 in)
- Kerb weight: 1,536 kg (3,386 lb)

Chronology
- Predecessor: Ford Falcon (ED)
- Successor: Ford Falcon (EL)

The Ford Falcon (EF) is a full-size car that was produced by Ford Australia from 1994 to 1996. It was the fourth significantly updated iteration of the fifth generation of the Falcon and also included the luxury-oriented Ford Fairmont (EF).

== Introduction and changes ==
The Ford EF Falcon was introduced in August 1994. It was a significant facelift of the Ford Falcon (ED), which it replaced. All exterior panels other than the doors were new for the EF, while Fairmont and Fairmont Ghia now had unique frontal styling differentiating them from the Falcon models. An upgraded EF Series II range was introduced in October 1995.

The EF Series also saw the first use of polycarbonate headlight lenses instead of glass, saving weight and gaining shatter resistance.

== Model range ==
The EF range was offered in six, four-door sedan and four, five-door wagon models, marketed as follows:

- Ford Falcon GLi sedan and wagon
- Ford Falcon Futura sedan and wagon
- Ford Falcon XR6 sedan and wagon
- Ford Falcon XR8 sedan
- Ford Fairmont sedan and wagon
- Ford Fairmont Ghia sedan

=== Trim levels ===
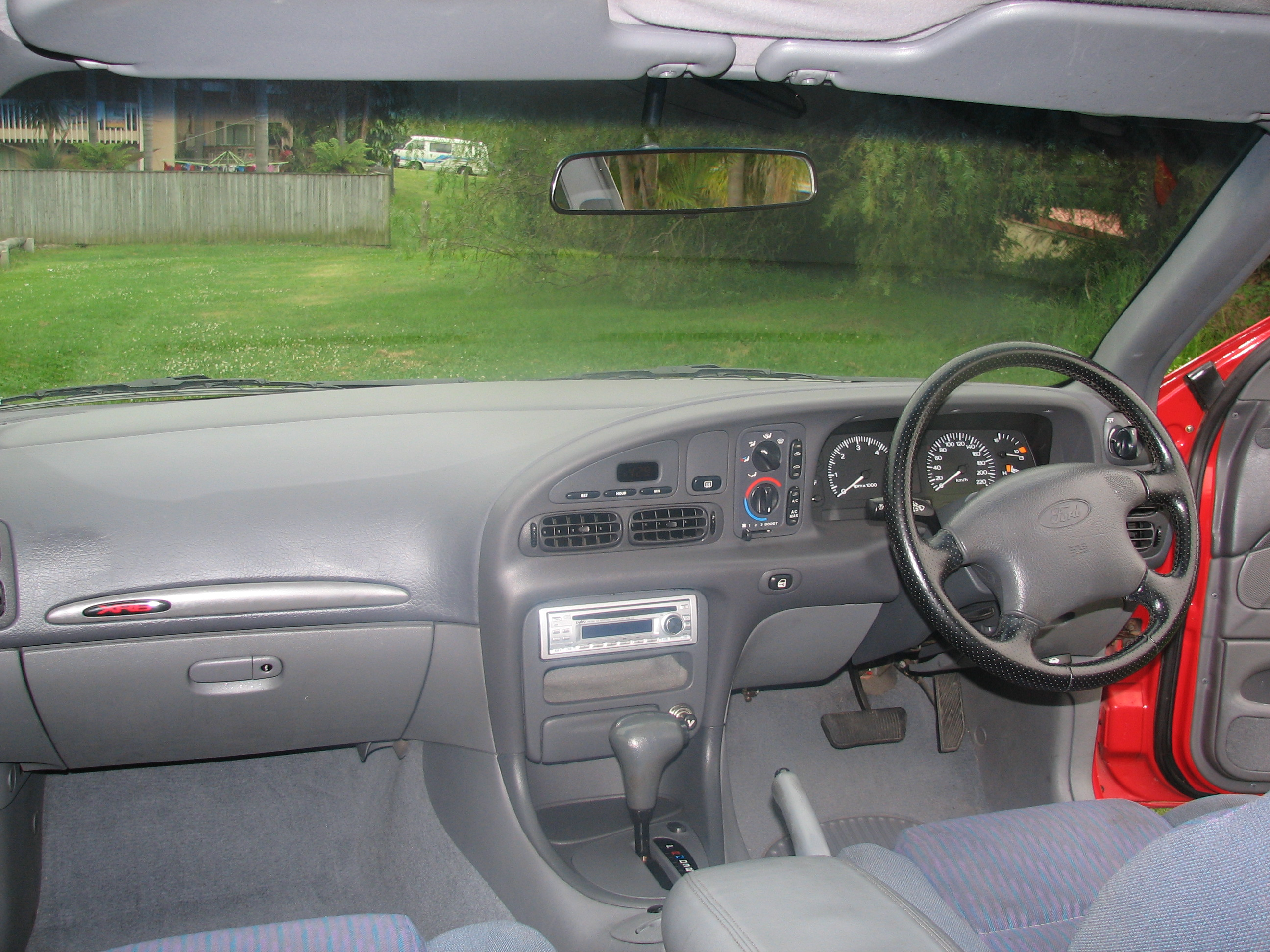
Interior

Base models

The EF range started with the GLi and Futura, appealing most to fleet buyers and family buyers respectively. GLi models were available in sedan and wagon versions and offered 15-inch wheels, body-coloured front and rear bumpers except insert mouldings, drivers airbag as standard, and the 5-speed manual was standard with 4.0-litre SOHC (single over head cam) inline six-cylinder, while a 5.0-litre V8 and four-speed automatic was optional.

The Futura shared the overall styling of the GLi and had the same engine and transmission options. While the Futura benefited from exterior differences such as body-coloured mirrors, bumpers and different wheel covers. The Futura was feature-rich, having front power windows, cruise control, ABS, rear headrests, interior map pockets standard, map lights, six-speaker audio system (six-stacker optional), a digital clock, variable intermittent wipers, fold-out rear-seat armrest and interior grab handles.

All of the base models offered an optional Tickford body kit, boot mounted spoiler with integrated stop light, a choice of 15- or 16-inch alloy wheels, six-stacker CD player (except GLi), disabled drivers pack and airbag compatible 'Smart Bar' bull-bar.

Sport models

The sport range comprised the XR6, which was available in both sedan and wagon, and the XR8, which was only available in a sedan. Both XR6 and XR8 had bold exterior styling similar to previous XR Falcons, featuring twin headlamps and red or black bumper strips (depending on the body colour) and unique 15-inch alloy wheels.

All XR models had the features of the Futura plus their own features, including Tickford reprogrammed gear changes for the electronically controlled four-speed auto, Tickford developed sports suspension which included lower springs and upgraded swaybars, rear spoiler with built-in brake light standard on both wagons and sedans (rear-window-mounted stop light still present but disabled), limited slip differential standard with a lower ratio for increased acceleration, adjustable see-through sports front and rear headrests, 'Sports' front bucket seats with side bolsters, oil pressure and battery voltage gauges, 'Charcoal' leather-wrapped steering wheel, low oil pressure and washer fluid low warning lights, dual horn note.

The XR6 had the same 4.0-litre SOHC (single over head cam) inline six-cylinder as the base models but with Tickford alloy cylinder heads, a Tickford spec cam along with higher pressure valve springs and unique EEC programming to make most of the changes made to the engine. A press bent 2.5-inch exhaust was also added, a minor upgrade over the standard 2.25-inch system.

The XR6 delivers 164 kW (220 hp) at 5000 rpm up from 161 kW (216 hp) in the ED Falcon. The XR8 has a 5.0-litre OHV (over head valve) V8 delivering 170 kW (230 hp) at 4500 rpm up from the 165 kW (221 hp). LPG was not offered as a factory option on the XR6 and XR8 models.

Transmissions available were a five-speed manual as standard and a four-speed auto which is electronically controlled and tuned by Tickford.

Luxury models

Luxury models in the EF Falcon range were not branded as Falcon; they were branded either a Ford Fairmont or Ford Fairmont Ghia. The Fairmont was based on the Futura and had all the features of the Futura but added a trip computer, climate control as standard, adjustable steering wheel, Remote Boot Release, Remote Keyless Entry, central locking and 15-inch alloy wheels. The Fairmont Ghia added a nine-speaker audio system, boot mounted 6 CD stacker, subwoofer and Ghia badging. Both the Fairmont and Fairmont Ghia models had chrome accents, differently designed headlights, bonnets and front bar, and were the only model in the EF Falcon range to have a grille (albeit non-functional). four-speed automatic transmission was standard across the Fairmont lineup and had the option of the 4.0-litre SOHC (single over head cam) inline six-cylinder or a 5.0-litre OHV (over head valve) V8. The six-cylinder Ghia version received the motor out of the XR6. The difference in power output is attributed to the quieter exhaust system fitted to the Ghia rather than the higher flowing system of the XR.

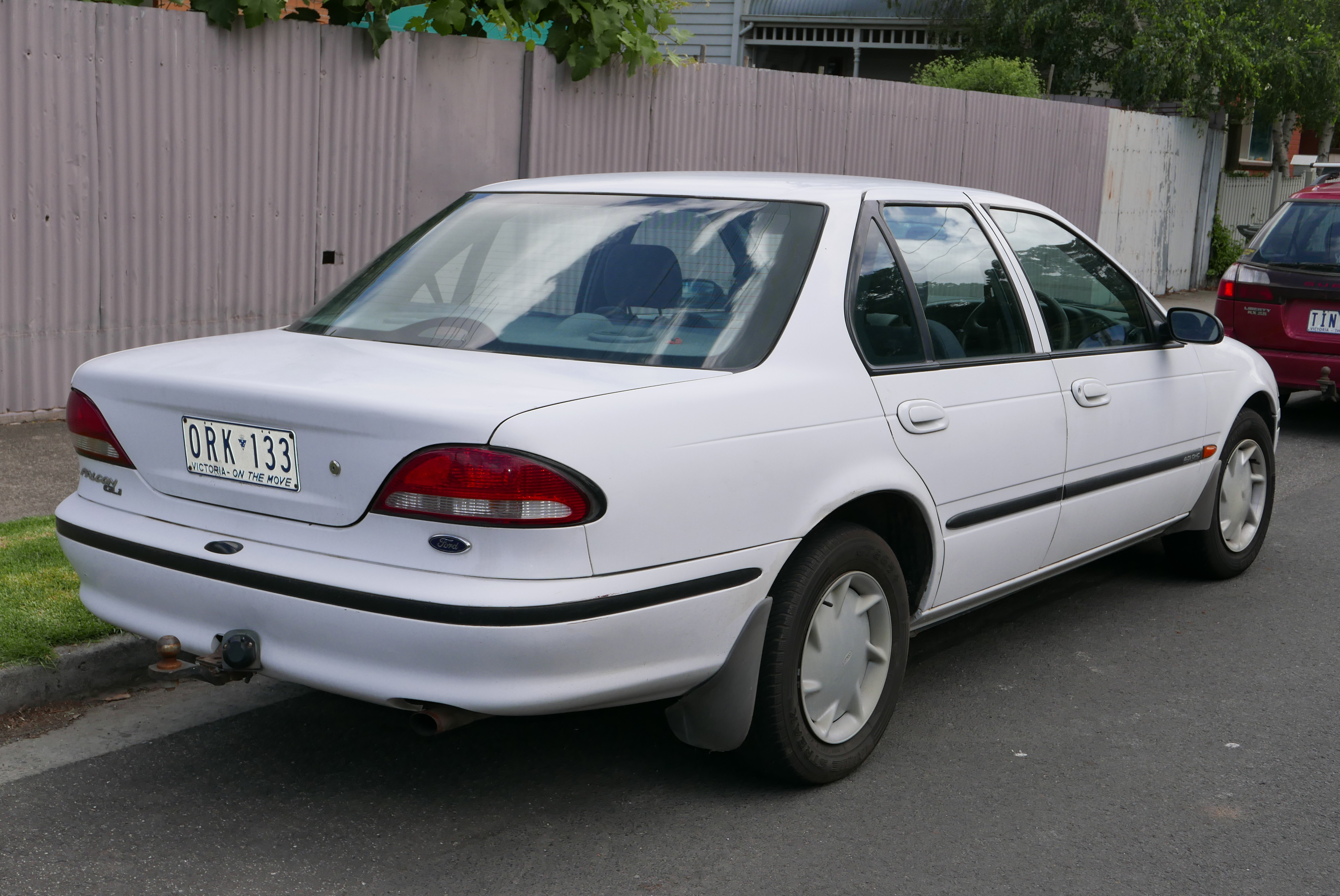
Falcon GLi sedan

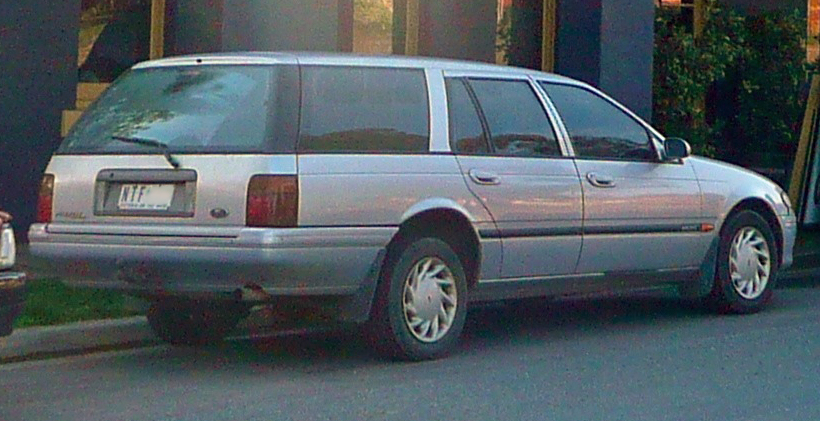
Falcon Futura wagon

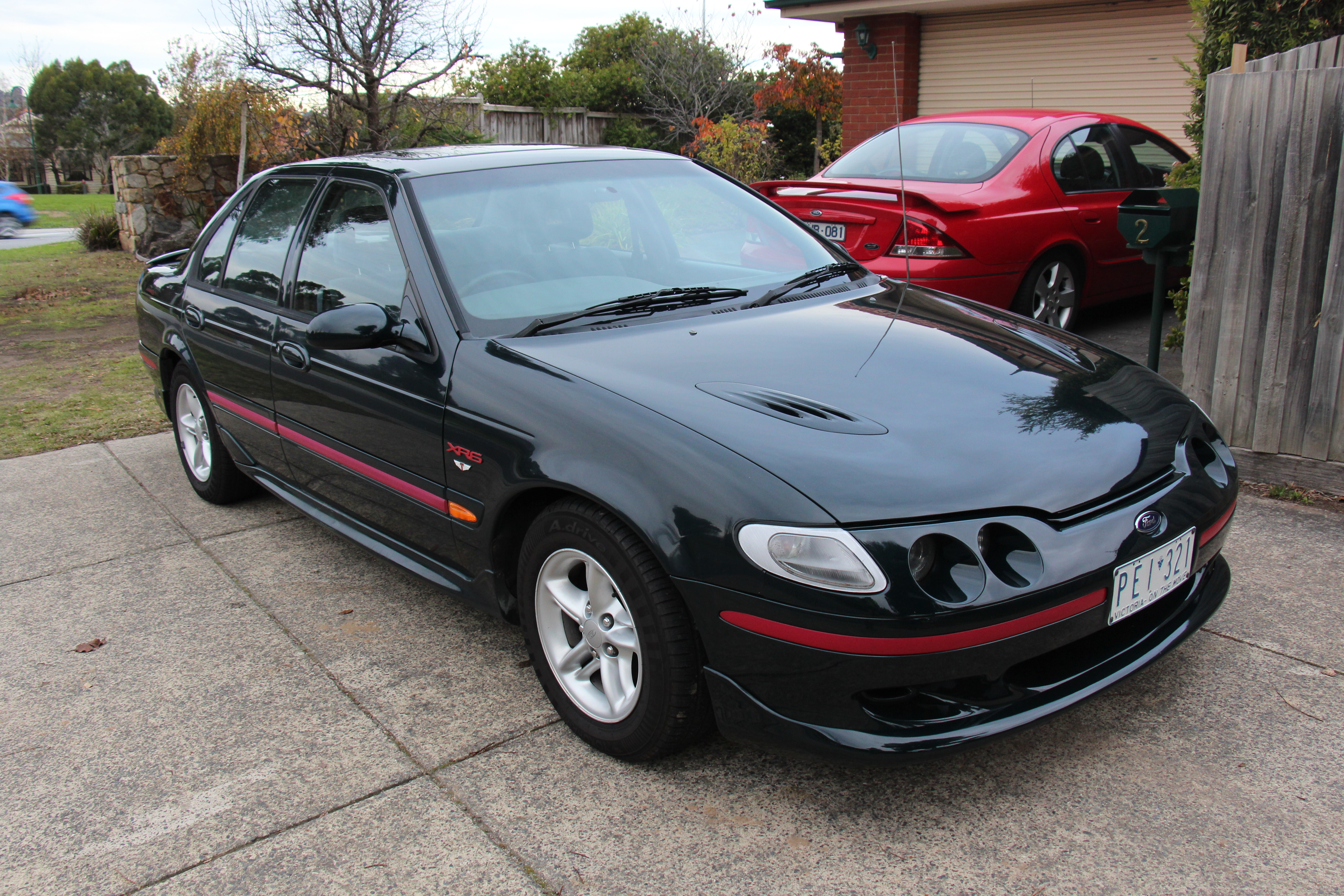
Falcon XR6 sedan

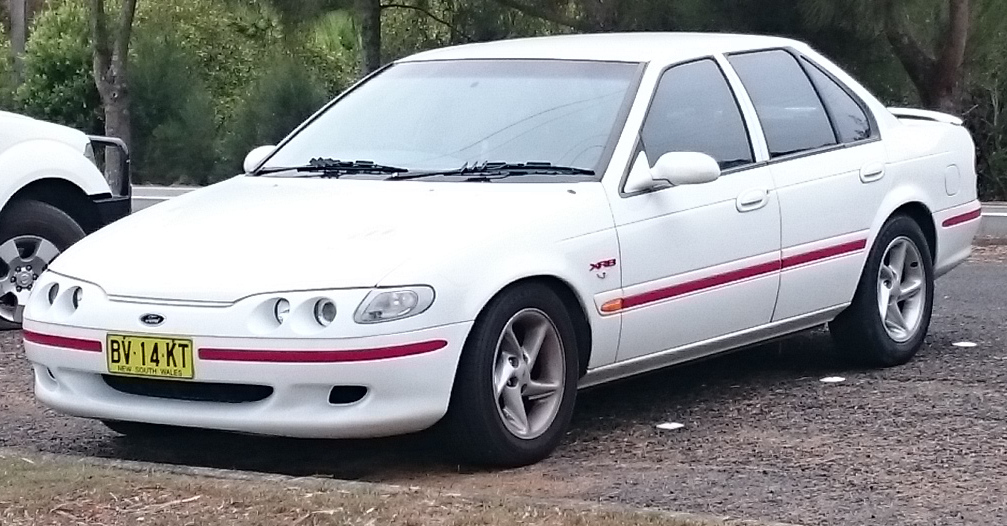
Falcon XR8 sedan

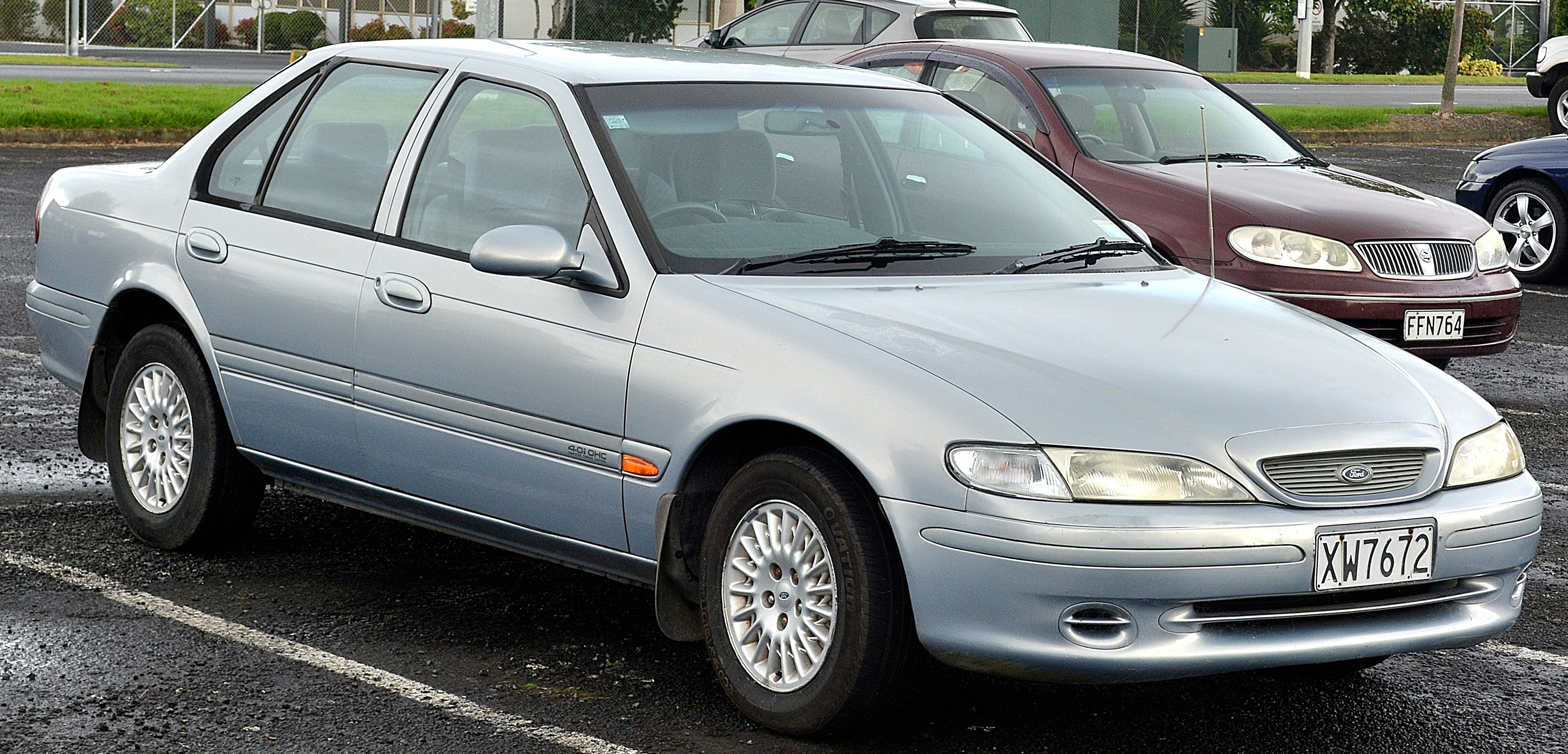
Fairmont sedan

=== Series II ===
The Series II was introduced in October 1995 adding over 1000 new features and eliminated the XR6 wagon from the range. The front suspension was revised by raising the position of the front ball joint, and fitting a thicker sway-bar and firmer bushes. This was the response to criticism that the EF Falcon was too "nervous" when handling. Another major improvement was the introduction of a passenger airbag that protected both front passengers (in bench seat configurations). The passenger airbag was a $510 option and was standard on the Fairmont Ghia. Series II EF Falcons are identifiable by revised hubcaps on the GLi model, revised body side rub strips on the Futura, and black B-pillars on the Fairmont Ghia. All EF II Falcons feature a wide-angle convex passenger side door mirror.

Limited editions

When the Series II EF Falcon was released two special editions were made available. A Classic option pack was offered on GLi and Futura sedans and wagons from November 1995 to March 1996 and an Olympic Classic pack was offered on the same models from May to August 1996.

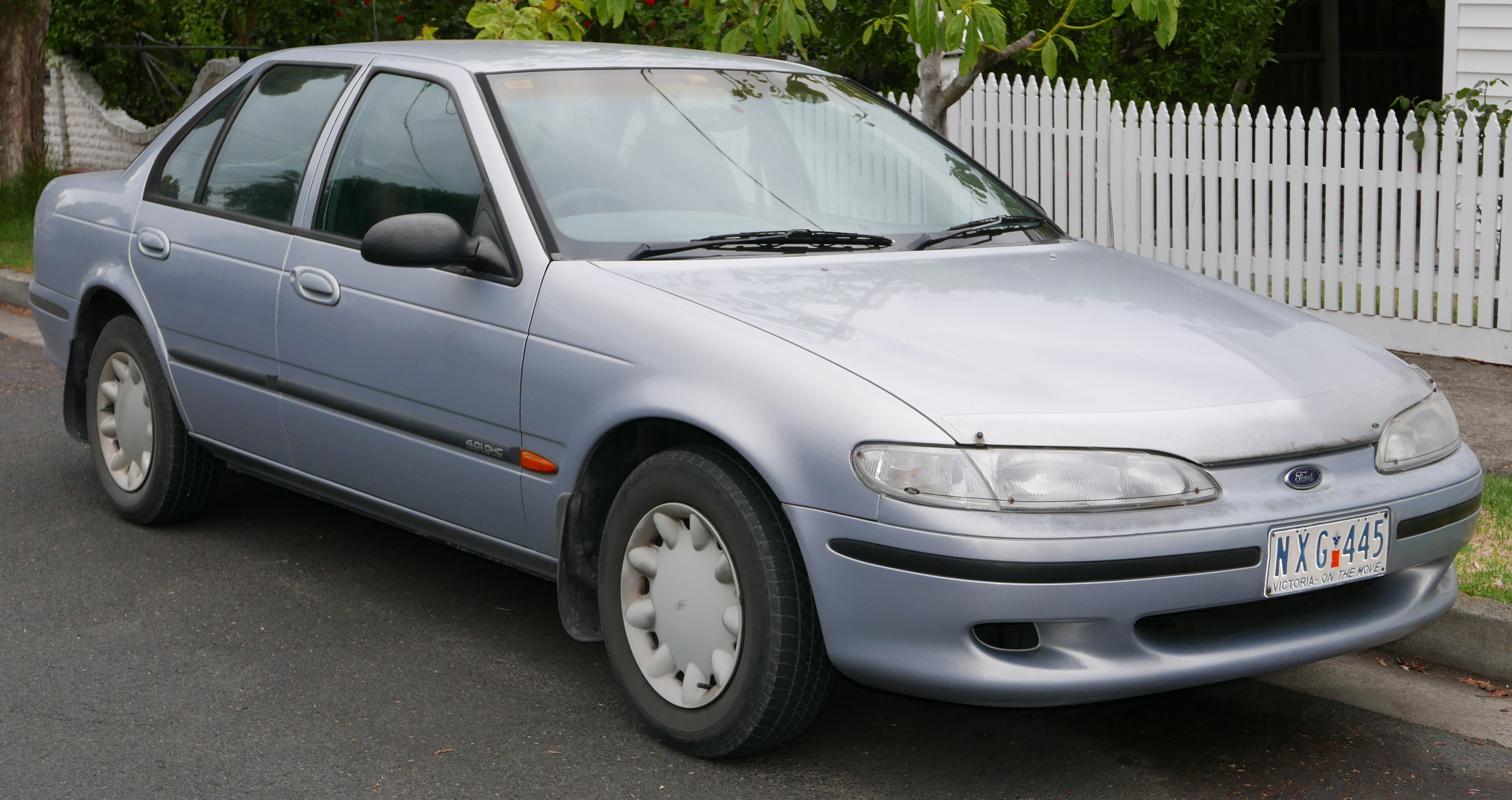
EF II Falcon GLi

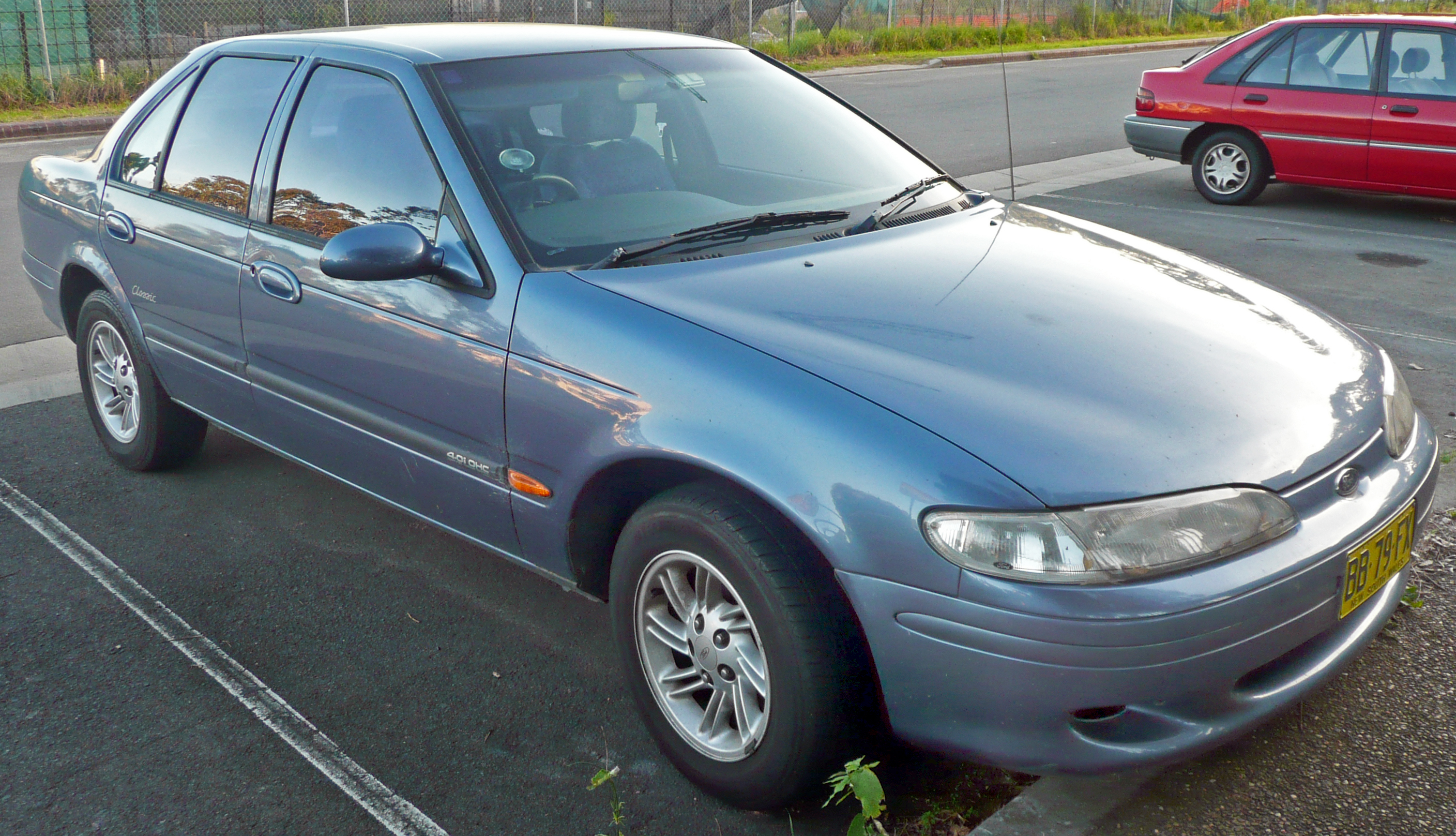
EF II Falcon Futura Classic sedan

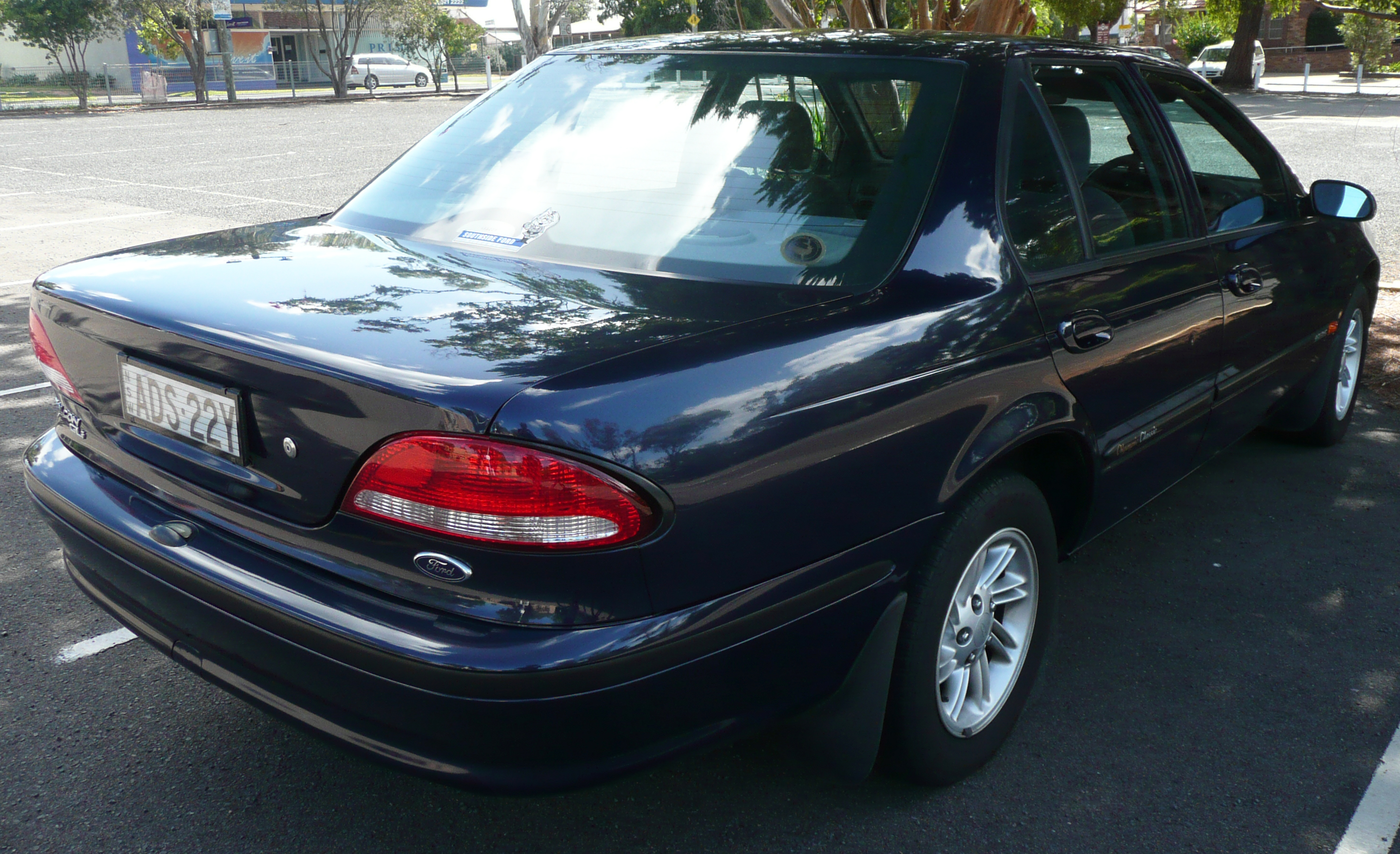
EF II GLi Olympic Classic sedan

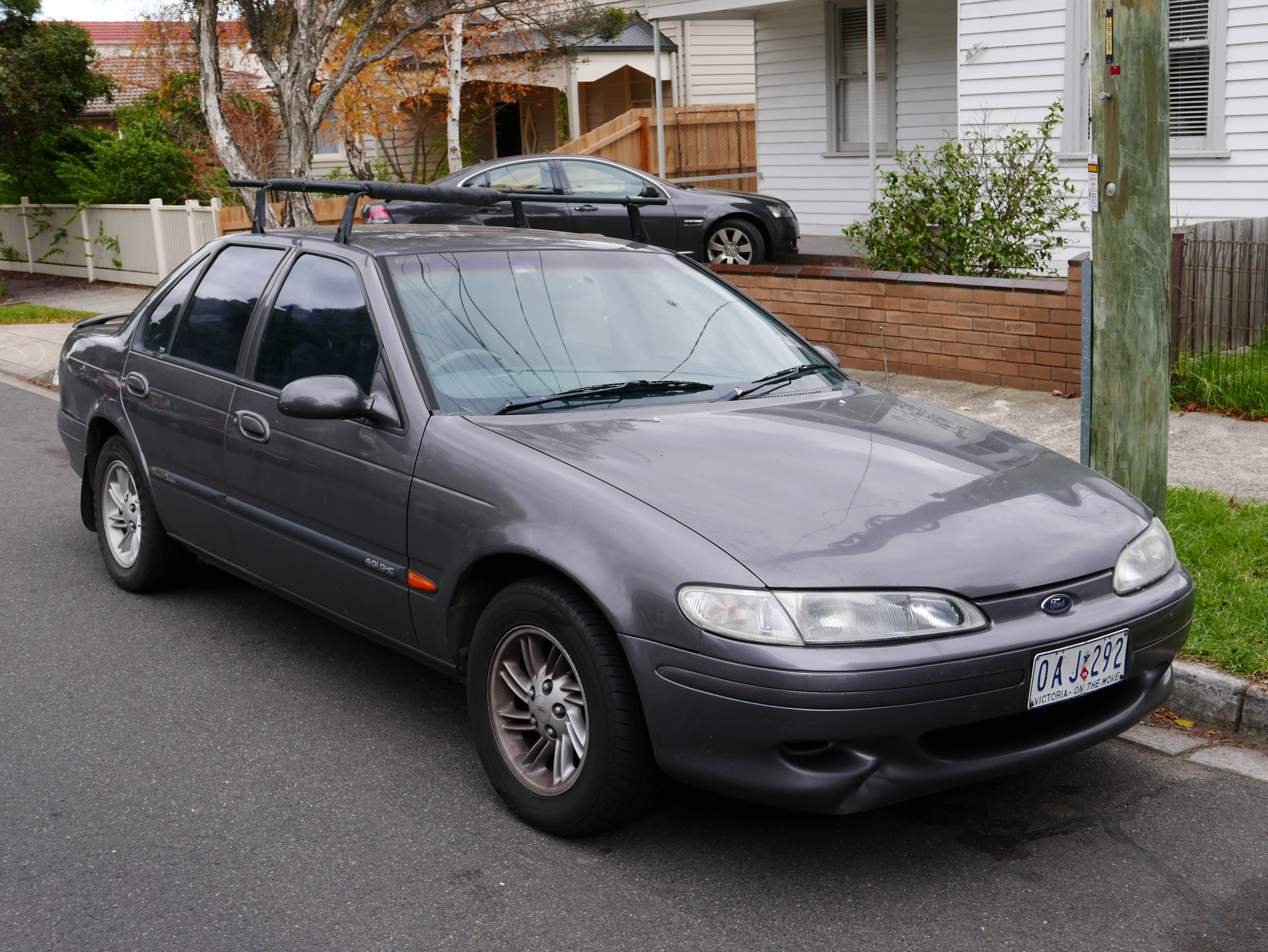
EF II Futura Olympic Classic sedan

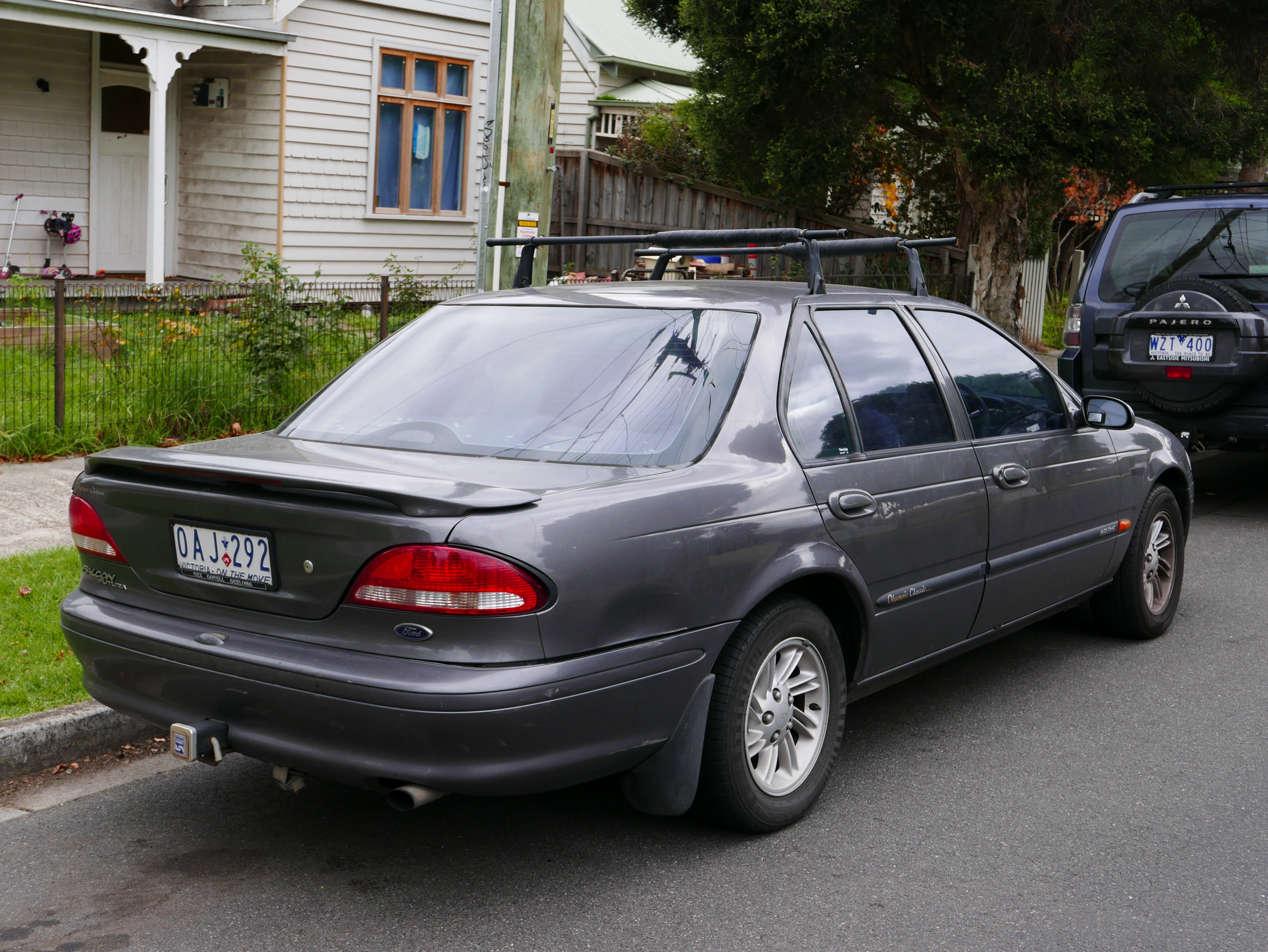
EF II Futura Olympic Classic sedan

== Production ==
A total of 192,100 EF models were produced prior to replacement of the EF by the Ford Falcon (EL) in 1996.

== See also ==
- Ford Falcon (XG) – Coupé utility and panel van of the Falcon line running concurrently with the EF series of cars and wagons
- Ford Falcon (XH) – Coupé utility and panel van of the Falcon line featuring EF Falcon styling and features
