= Tasmania Supercars round =

Australian motor racing event

Tasmania Super 440
- Race Information
Venue	Symmons Plains Raceway
Number of times held	53
First held	1969
- Race Format
- Race 1
Laps	50
Distance	120 km
- Race 2
Laps	50
Distance	120 km
- Race 3
Laps	84
Distance	200 km
- Last Event (2026)
- Overall Winner
(Australia) Broc Feeney	Triple Eight Race Engineering
- Race Winners
(Australia) Chaz Mostert	Walkinshaw TWG Racing
(New Zealand) Andre Heimgartner	Brad Jones Racing
(Australia) Broc Feeney	Triple Eight Race Engineering

The Tasmania Super 440 is the current name for the annual motor racing event for Supercars, held at Symmons Plains Raceway in Launceston, Tasmania. The event has been a regular part of the Supercars Championship—and its previous incarnations, the Australian Touring Car Championship, Shell Championship Series and V8 Supercars Championship—since 1969.

Behind Sandown Raceway, which has most commonly hosted the Sandown 500 and Sandown SuperSprint, Symmons Plains has hosted the most events in championship history with 53 as of 2026. Prior to the 2020 event being cancelled due to the COVID-19 pandemic, the only hiatus for the event was between 2000 and 2003 during which the circuit received a A$3 million upgrade. The event is seen as one of Tasmania's largest sporting events, providing a variety of benefits to the local economy.

== Format ==
The event is staged over a three-day weekend, from Friday to Sunday. Two thirty-minute practice sessions are held on Friday. On Saturday, two two-part qualifying sessions are held which decide the grid positions for the following two 120 kilometre races. A further two-part qualifying is held on Sunday, followed by a top ten shootout to determine the grid for the following 190 km race.

== History ==
When the Australian Touring Car Championship (ATCC) was first held over a series of races in 1969, Symmons Plains was included on the calendar as the final race of the series. The race would decide the championship that year, as Alan Hamilton could take the title from Ian Geoghegan if he won the race and Geoghegan failed to score. Geoghegan's car failed to start at the one-minute signal and his pit crew push started the car. This was not allowed under the regulations of the time and Geoghegan was disqualified. Hamilton ended up finishing the race in second place behind Norm Beechey, losing the title to Geoghegan by a single point. After again hosting the final round in 1970, Symmons Plains became the home of the opening round, hosting the first event of the ATCC every year from 1971 to 1981. Allan Moffat and Peter Brock were the most successful drivers at the event in this period, taking seven of the eleven possible victories between them. John Harvey also scored his only two ATCC victories at the event, winning in 1976 and 1979.

In 1985, Robbie Francevic won his and Volvo's first round victory, winning again in 1986. Between 1988 and 1990, Dick Johnson joined Moffat as the only two drivers to win three consecutive rounds at the circuit. In 1993, 1980 Formula One World Champion Alan Jones won his first ATCC round, despite clashes with Mark Skaife, which led to a confrontation after the race, and Wayne Gardner. In the late 1990s, Holden Racing Team dominated the event with four consecutive round wins from 1996 to 1999. During this period, the Symmons Plains event remained in the early part of the ATCC calendar until 1999, when it was moved to August. The Government of Tasmania didn't renew the event's contract after 1999 and the race dropped off the calendar in 2000.

Following the completion of a circuit upgrade in 2004, which included the construction of permanent pit lane facilities and a resurfacing of the track, a new deal was struck to bring the event back onto the calendar in November of the same year. Tasmanian driver Marcos Ambrose went into the 2004 event attempting to seal a back-to-back championship victory, until an engine failure in the third and final race of the weekend delayed his coronation as champion. David Besnard and three other drivers benefited from a fortuitous late-race safety car to jump to the front of the field, before the four drivers were then demoted to the back of the field at a subsequent safety car due to confusion regarding the standings. Several days later, Besnard was credited with the win, the only win for WPS Racing. Initially on its return, the event was generally held towards the end of the season, often as the penultimate event, until a move to the early stages of the championship calendar in 2012.

Between 2007 and 2015, Jamie Whincup and Triple Eight Race Engineering dominated the event with six wins. This has seen Whincup surpass Brock as the most successful driver in the event's history. In 2013, Fabian Coulthard won Brad Jones Racing their first championship round, winning two races with team-mate Jason Bright winning the other. In 2017, the Saturday race was suspended after two laps due to a twelve car pile-up in wet conditions. While the race later briefly restarted under safety car, no championship points were awarded due to the short distance completed, however Shane van Gisbergen was still credited with a race victory. In 2018, a three-stage knockout qualifying system was introduced to the championship at Symmons Plains to reduce the risks of traffic. Craig Lowndes won the round, his last round win as a solo driver, and his first at the circuit since 1998.

The 2020 event was postponed until November due to the COVID-19 pandemic, before later being cancelled altogether. In 2026, the circuit hosted its 100th championship race, the second venue after Wanneroo Raceway to achieve the milestone.

== Winners ==
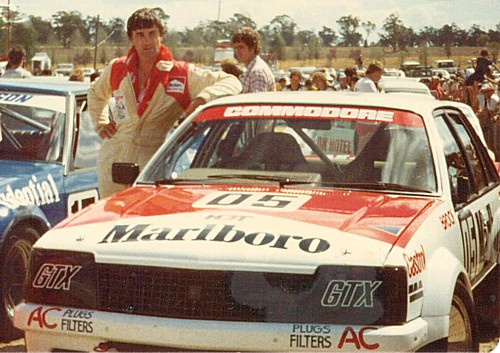
Peter Brock at Symmons Plains in 1982. He would win the event that year.

Year	Driver	Team/Entrant	Car	Report
1969	(Australia) Norm Beechey	Norm Beechey	Holden HK Monaro GTS327	
1970	(Australia) Jim McKeown	Shell Racing Team	Porsche 911	
1971	(Canada) Allan Moffat	Allan Moffat Racing	Ford Boss 302 Mustang	
1972	(Canada) Allan Moffat	Allan Moffat Racing	Ford Boss 302 Mustang	
1973	(Canada) Allan Moffat	Ford Works Team	Ford XY Falcon GTHO Phase III	
1974	(Australia) Peter Brock	Holden Dealer Team	Holden LJ Torana GTR XU-1	
1975	(Australia) Colin Bond	Holden Dealer Team	Holden Torana L34	
1976	(Australia) John Harvey	B&D Autos	Holden Torana L34	
1977	(Canada) Allan Moffat	Allan Moffat Racing	Ford XB Falcon GT	
1978	(Australia) Peter Brock	Holden Dealer Team	Holden LX Torana SLR A9X	
1979	(Australia) John Harvey	Holden Dealer Team	Holden LX Torana SS A9X	
1980	(Australia) Peter Brock	Holden Dealer Team	Holden VB Commodore	
1981	(Australia) Dick Johnson	Dick Johnson Racing	Ford XD Falcon	
1982	(Australia) Peter Brock	Holden Dealer Team	Holden VC Commodore	
1983	(Australia) Allan Grice	Roadways Racing	Holden VH Commodore	
1984	(Australia) Peter Brock	Holden Dealer Team	Holden VH Commodore	
1985	(New Zealand) Robbie Francevic	Mark Petch Motorsport	Volvo 240T	
1986	(New Zealand) Robbie Francevic	Volvo Dealer Team	Volvo 240T	
1987	(Australia) George Fury	Gibson Motorsport	Nissan Skyline DR30	
1988	(Australia) Dick Johnson	Dick Johnson Racing	Ford Sierra RS500	
1989	(Australia) Dick Johnson	Dick Johnson Racing	Ford Sierra RS500	
1990	(Australia) Dick Johnson	Dick Johnson Racing	Ford Sierra RS500	
1991	(New Zealand) Jim Richards	Gibson Motorsport	Nissan Skyline R32 GT-R	
1992	(Australia) Glenn Seton	Glenn Seton Racing	Ford Sierra RS500	
1993	(Australia) Alan Jones	Glenn Seton Racing	Ford EB Falcon	
1994	(Australia) Mark Skaife	Gibson Motorsport	Holden VP Commodore	Report
1995	(Australia) John Bowe	Dick Johnson Racing	Ford EF Falcon	Report
1996	(Australia) Craig Lowndes	Holden Racing Team	Holden VR Commodore	
1997	(New Zealand) Greg Murphy	Holden Racing Team	Holden VS Commodore	
1998	(Australia) Craig Lowndes	Holden Racing Team	Holden VT Commodore	
1999	(Australia) Mark Skaife	Holden Racing Team	Holden VT Commodore	Report
2000 – 2003	not held			
2004	(Australia) Russell Ingall	Stone Brothers Racing	Ford BA Falcon	
2005	(Australia) Garth Tander	HSV Dealer Team	Holden VZ Commodore	
2006	(Australia) Garth Tander	HSV Dealer Team	Holden VZ Commodore	
2007	(Australia) Jamie Whincup	Triple Eight Race Engineering	Ford BF Falcon	Report
2008	(Australia) Jamie Whincup	Triple Eight Race Engineering	Ford BF Falcon	Report
2009	(Australia) Will Davison	Holden Racing Team	Holden VE Commodore	Report
2010	(Australia) Mark Winterbottom	Ford Performance Racing	Ford FG Falcon	
2011	(Australia) Jamie Whincup	Triple Eight Race Engineering	Holden VE Commodore	
2012	(Australia) Jamie Whincup	Triple Eight Race Engineering	Holden VE Commodore	Report
2013	(New Zealand) Fabian Coulthard	Brad Jones Racing	Holden VF Commodore	Report
2014	(Australia) Jamie Whincup	Triple Eight Race Engineering	Holden VF Commodore	Report
2015	(Australia) Jamie Whincup	Triple Eight Race Engineering	Holden VF Commodore	Report
2016	(Australia) Will Davison	Tekno Autosports	Holden VF Commodore	Report
2017	(New Zealand) Fabian Coulthard	DJR Team Penske	Ford FG X Falcon	Report
2018	(Australia) Craig Lowndes	Triple Eight Race Engineering	Holden ZB Commodore	Report
2019	(New Zealand) Shane van Gisbergen	Triple Eight Race Engineering	Holden ZB Commodore	Report
2020	not held due to COVID-19 pandemic			
2021	(Australia) Jamie Whincup	Triple Eight Race Engineering	Holden ZB Commodore	
2022	(New Zealand) Shane van Gisbergen	Triple Eight Race Engineering	Holden ZB Commodore	Report
2023	(Australia) Will Brown	Erebus Motorsport	Chevrolet Camaro ZL1-1LE	
2024	(Australia) Cameron Waters	Tickford Racing	Ford Mustang GT	
2025	(Australia) Broc Feeney	Triple Eight Race Engineering	Chevrolet Camaro ZL1-1LE	
2026	(Australia) Broc Feeney	Triple Eight Race Engineering	Ford Mustang GT	

== Multiple winners ==
=== By driver ===
Wins	Driver	Years
7	(Australia) Jamie Whincup	2007, 2008, 2011, 2012, 2014, 2015, 2021
5	(Australia) Peter Brock	1974, 1978, 1980, 1982, 1984
4	(Canada) Allan Moffat	1971, 1972, 1973, 1977
4	(Australia) Dick Johnson	1981, 1988, 1989, 1990
3	(Australia) Craig Lowndes	1996, 1998, 2018
2	(Australia) John Harvey	1976, 1979
2	(New Zealand) Robbie Francevic	1985, 1986
2	(Australia) Mark Skaife	1994, 1999
2	(Australia) Garth Tander	2005, 2006
2	(Australia) Will Davison	2009, 2016
2	(New Zealand) Fabian Coulthard	2013, 2017
2	(New Zealand) Shane van Gisbergen	2019, 2022
2	(Australia) Broc Feeney	2025, 2026

=== By team ===
Wins	Team
12	Triple Eight Race Engineering
7	Holden Dealer Team
6	DJR Team Penske^{1}
5	Holden Racing Team
3	Allan Moffat Racing
3	Gibson Motorsport
2	Glenn Seton Racing
2	HSV Dealer Team
2	Tickford Racing^{2}

=== By manufacturer ===
Wins	Manufacturer
28	Holden
18	Ford
2	Volvo
2	Nissan
2	Chevrolet

Notes

- ^1 – DJR Team Penske was known as Dick Johnson Racing from 1980 to 2014, hence their statistics are combined.
- ^2 – Tickford Racing was known as Ford Performance Racing from 2003 to 2014, hence their statistics are combined.

== Event names and sponsors ==
- 1969–85, 1987–99, 2004: Symmons Plains
- 1986: A.N.L. Cup
- 2005–06: Ferodo Triple Challenge
- 2006: Ferodo Tasmania Challenge
- 2007–12: Falken Tasmania Challenge
- 2013: Tasmania Microsoft Office 365
- 2014: Tyrepower Tasmania 400
- 2015–19: Tyrepower Tasmania SuperSprint
- 2021: Beaurepaires Tasmania SuperSprint
- 2022–24: NED Whisky Tasmania SuperSprint
- 2025: Snowy River Caravans Tasmania Super 440
- 2026: Tyrepower Tasmania Super 440

== See also ==
- List of Australian Touring Car Championship races
