= 1995 ATCC Bathurst round =

(New South Wales) 1995 ATCC Bathurst round
Event Information
- Round 3 of 10 in the 1995 Australian Touring Car Championship
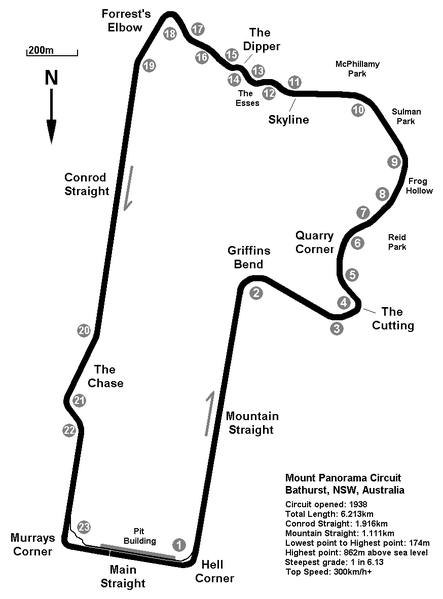
- Date: 10–12 March 1995
- Location: Bathurst, New South Wales
- Venue: Mount Panorama
- Weather: Fine

Results
Race 1
Distance	15 laps	93 km
Pole position	John Bowe; Dick Johnson Racing	2:11.300
Winner	John Bowe; Dick Johnson Racing	33:45
Race 2
Distance	15 laps	93 km
Winner	Mark Skaife; Gibson Motorsport	33:49
Round Results
First	John Bowe; Dick Johnson Racing	35 pts
Second	Mark Skaife; Gibson Motorsport	32 pts
Third	Larry Perkins; Perkins Engineering	28 pts

The 1995 ATCC Bathurst round was the third round of the 1995 Australian Touring Car Championship. It was held on the weekend of 10 to 12 March at the Mount Panorama Circuit in Bathurst, New South Wales.

Despite not winning either race, John Bowe took the overall round win ahead of Mark Skaife who won the second race. Bowe's teammate Dick Johnson won the opening race. It would turn out to be Johnson's last Australian touring car victory.

== Background ==
The event was held on the weekend of 10 to 12 March 1995. It was the fifth ATCC/V8 Supercar event to be held at the Mount Panorama Circuit in the sprint format and consisted of two 15 lap races, as well as the three-lap Dash for Cash for the fastest ten qualifiers. Starting positions for the "dash" were drawn at random.

The Bathurst venue would serve as a replacement for the outgoing Amaroo Park and would be the first ATCC event to be held at the venue as part of the championship since 1972.

=== Entry list ===
A total of 22 drivers were entered into the weekend.

Trevor Ashby of the Lansvale Racing Team and Phil Ward made their first appearances of the season at this round. Mark Larkham would also make his series debut.

Jim Richards of Gibson Motorsport was entered into the weekend but would not partake in any of the sessions after a crash in practice.

== Race results ==
=== Qualifying ===
Pos	No	Name	Car	Team	Time
1	18	(Australia) John Bowe	Dick Johnson Racing	Ford Falcon (EF)	2:11.30
2	17	(Australia) Dick Johnson	Dick Johnson Racing	Ford Falcon (EF)	2:11.91
3	30	(Australia) Glenn Seton	Glenn Seton Racing	Ford Falcon (EF)	2:12.21
4	05	(Australia) Peter Brock	Holden Racing Team	Holden Commodore (VR)	2:12.26
5	1	(Australia) Mark Skaife	Gibson Motorsport	Holden Commodore (VR)	2:12.50
6	015	(Australia) Tomas Mezera	Holden Racing Team	Holden Commodore (VR)	2:13.00
7	11	(Australia) Larry Perkins	Perkins Engineering	Holden Commodore (VR)	2:13.09
8	35	(Australia) Alan Jones	Glenn Seton Racing	Ford Falcon (EF)	2:13.55
9	25	(Australia) Tony Longhurst	Longhurst Racing	Ford Falcon (EF)	2:13.70
10	4	(Australia) Wayne Gardner	Wayne Gardner Racing	Holden Commodore (VR)	2:13.81
11	7	(Australia) Neil Crompton	Wayne Gardner Racing	Holden Commodore (VR)	2:14.36
12	13	(Australia) Phil Ward	Phil Ward Racing	Holden Commodore (VP)	2:15.51
13	3	(Australia) Trevor Ashby	Lansvale Racing Team	Holden Commodore (VP)	2:15.73
14	24	(Australia) Paul Romano	Romano Racing	Holden Commodore (VP)	2:16.50
15	49	(Australia) David Attard	Alcair Racing	Holden Commodore (VP)	2:16.96
16	38	(Australia) Mark Poole	James Rosenberg Racing	Holden Commodore (VP)	2:17.33
17	47	(Australia) John Trimbole	Daily Planet Racing	Ford Falcon (EB)	2:19.24
18	74	(Australia) Kevin Heffernan	Pace Racing	Holden Commodore (VP)	2:20.01
19	62	(Australia) Wayne Russell	Novocastrian Motorsport	Holden Commodore (VP)	2:21.84
20	88	(Australia) Bill O'Brien	Bill O'Brien Racing	Holden Commodore (VL) SS Group A SV	2:21.84
21	10	(Australia) Mark Larkham	Larkham Motorsport	Ford Falcon (EF)	3:24.10
	2	(New Zealand) Jim Richards	Gibson Motorsport	Holden Commodore (VR)	no time
	27	(Australia) Terry Finnigan	Terry Finnigan Racing	Holden Commodore (VP)	no time

=== Dash for Cash ===
Pos	No	Name	Team	Vehicle	Laps	Grid
1	11	(Australia) Larry Perkins	Perkins Engineering	Holden Commodore (VR)	3	2
2	17	(Australia) Dick Johnson	Dick Johnson Racing	Ford Falcon (EF)	3	5
3	05	(Australia) Peter Brock	Holden Racing Team	Holden Commodore (VR)	3	3
4	18	(Australia) John Bowe	Dick Johnson Racing	Ford Falcon (EF)	3	7
5	25	(Australia) Tony Longhurst	Longhurst Racing	Ford Falcon (EF)	3	4
6	30	(Australia) Glenn Seton	Glenn Seton Racing	Ford Falcon (EF)	3	1
7	4	(Australia) Wayne Gardner	Wayne Gardner Racing	Holden Commodore (VR)	3	6
8	35	(Australia) Alan Jones	Glenn Seton Racing	Ford Falcon (EF)	3	8
9	015	(Australia) Tomas Mezera	Holden Racing Team	Holden Commodore (VR)	3	9
Ret	1	(Australia) Mark Skaife	Gibson Motorsport	Holden Commodore (VR)	1	10

=== Race 1 ===
Pos	No	Name	Team	Vehicle	Laps	Time/Retired	Grid
1	17	(Australia) Dick Johnson	Dick Johnson Racing	Ford Falcon (EF)	16	33:45	2
2	18	(Australia) John Bowe	Dick Johnson Racing	Ford Falcon (EF)	15	33:47	1
3	30	(Australia) Glenn Seton	Glenn Seton Racing	Ford Falcon (EF)	15	33:48	3
4	1	(Australia) Mark Skaife	Gibson Motorsport	Holden Commodore (VR)	15	33:55	5
5	11	(Australia) Larry Perkins	Perkins Engineering	Holden Commodore (VR)	15	33:56	7
6	015	(Australia) Tomas Mezera	Holden Racing Team	Holden Commodore (VR)	15	34:00	6
7	35	(Australia) Alan Jones	Glenn Seton Racing	Ford Falcon (EF)	15	34:09	8
8	05	(Australia) Peter Brock	Holden Racing Team	Holden Commodore (VR)	15	34:13	4
9	25	(Australia) Tony Longhurst	Longhurst Racing	Ford Falcon (EF)	15	34:33	9
10	13	(Australia) Phil Ward	Phil Ward Racing	Holden Commodore (VP)	15	34:35	12
11	24	(Australia) Paul Romano	Romano Racing	Holden Commodore (VP)	27	35:02	14
12	49	(Australia) David Attard	Alcair Racing	Holden Commodore (VP)	15	35:04	15
13	47	(Australia) John Trimbole	Daily Planet Racing	Ford Falcon (EB)	15	35:38	17
14	38	(Australia) Mark Poole	James Rosenberg Racing	Holden Commodore (VP)	15	35:46	16
15	74	(Australia) Kevin Heffernan	PACE Racing	Holden Commodore (VP)	14	+ 1 lap	18
16	62	(Australia) Wayne Russell	Novocastrian Motorsport	Holden Commodore (VP)	14	+ 1 lap	19
17	88	(Australia) Bill O'Brien	Bill O'Brien Racing	Holden Commodore (VL) SS Group A SV	14	+ 1 lap	20
NC	10	(Australia) Mark Larkham	Larkham Motorsport	Ford Falcon (EF)	7	+ 8 laps	21
NC	27	(Australia) Terry Finnigan	Terry Finnigan Racing	Holden Commodore (VP)	5	+ 10 laps	22
NC	3	(Australia) Trevor Ashby	Lansvale Racing Team	Holden Commodore (VP)	2	+ 13 laps	13
Ret	4	(Australia) Wayne Gardner	Wayne Gardner Racing	Holden Commodore (VR)	0	Accident	10
Ret	7	(Australia) Neil Crompton	Wayne Gardner Racing	Holden Commodore (VR)	0	Accident	11
DNS	2	(New Zealand) Jim Richards	Gibson Motorsport	Holden Commodore (VR)		Did not start	
Fastest lap: Peter Brock (Holden Racing Team) - 2:14.427

=== Race 2 ===
Pos	No	Name	Team	Vehicle	Laps	Time/Retired	Grid
1	1	(Australia) Mark Skaife	Gibson Motorsport	Holden Commodore (VR)	15	33:49	4
2	18	(Australia) John Bowe	Dick Johnson Racing	Ford Falcon (EF)	15	33:52	2
3	11	(Australia) Larry Perkins	Perkins Engineering	Holden Commodore (VR)	15	33:55	5
4	015	(Australia) Tomas Mezera	Holden Racing Team	Holden Commodore (VR)	15	33:58	6
5	30	(Australia) Glenn Seton	Glenn Seton Racing	Ford Falcon (EF)	15	33:58	3
6	05	(Australia) Peter Brock	Holden Racing Team	Holden Commodore (VR)	15	33:58	8
7	35	(Australia) Alan Jones	Glenn Seton Racing	Ford Falcon (EF)	15	34:00	7
8	25	(Australia) Tony Longhurst	Longhurst Racing	Ford Falcon (EF)	15	34:02	9
9	17	(Australia) Dick Johnson	Dick Johnson Racing	Ford Falcon (EF)	15	34:27	1
10	3	(Australia) Trevor Ashby	Lansvale Racing Team	Holden Commodore (VP)	15	34:56	20
11	49	(Australia) David Attard	Alcair Racing	Holden Commodore (VP)	15	34:57	12
12	24	(Australia) Paul Romano	Romano Racing	Holden Commodore (VP)	15	34:58	11
13	38	(Australia) Mark Poole	James Rosenberg Racing	Holden Commodore (VP)	15	35:08	14
14	13	(Australia) Phil Ward	Phil Ward Racing	Holden Commodore (VP)	13	+ 2 laps	10
15	62	(Australia) Wayne Russell	Novocastrian Motorsport	Holden Commodore (VP)	13	+ 2 laps	16
NC	74	(Australia) Kevin Heffernan	PACE Racing	Holden Commodore (VP)	6	+ 9 laps	15
NC	10	(Australia) Mark Larkham	Larkham Motorsport	Ford Falcon (EF)	2	+ 13 laps	18
DNS	47	(Australia) John Trimbole	Daily Planet Racing	Ford Falcon (EB)		Did not start	
DNS	88	(Australia) Bill O'Brien	Bill O'Brien Racing	Holden Commodore (VL) SS Group A SV		Did not start	
DNS	27	(Australia) Terry Finnigan	Terry Finnigan Racing	Holden Commodore (VP)		Did not start	
DNS	4	(Australia) Wayne Gardner	Wayne Gardner Racing	Holden Commodore (VR)		Did not start	
DNS	7	(Australia) Neil Crompton	Wayne Gardner Racing	Holden Commodore (VR)		Did not start	
DNS	2	(New Zealand) Jim Richards	Gibson Motorsport	Holden Commodore (VR)		Did not start	
Fastest lap: John Bowe (Dick Johnson Racing) - 2:13.592

== Championship standings after the event ==
- After Round 3 of 10. Only the top five positions are included.

Drivers' Championship standings

	Pos.	No.	Driver	Team	Points
	1	18	(Australia) John Bowe	Dick Johnson Racing	104
1	2	11	(Australia) Larry Perkins	Perkins Engineering	79
1	3	05	(Australia) Peter Brock	Holden Racing Team	65
1	4	015	(Australia) Tomas Mezera	Holden Racing Team	60
2	5	17	(Australia) Dick Johnson	Dick Johnson Racing	49
