= 1995 ATCC Sandown round =

(Victoria (state)) 1995 ATCC Round 1
Event Information
- Round 1 of 10 in the 1995 Australian Touring Car Championship
- Date: 3–5 February 1995
- Location: Melbourne, Victoria
- Venue: Sandown International Raceway
- Weather: Rain

Results
Race 1
Distance	28 laps	88.2 km
Pole position	John Bowe; Dick Johnson Racing	1:12.811
Winner	Larry Perkins; Castrol Racing	41:22.719
Race 2
Distance	28 laps	88.2 km
Winner	John Bowe; Dick Johnson Racing	39:20.270
Round Results
First	Larry Perkins; Castrol Racing	37 pts
Second	John Bowe; Dick Johnson Racing	30 pts
Third	Wayne Gardner; Coca-Cola Racing	30 pts

The 1995 Sandown ATCC round was the opening round of the 1995 Australian Touring Car Championship. It was held on the weekend of 3 to 5 February at Sandown Raceway in Melbourne, Victoria. It consisted of two 28-lap races and the "Dash for Cash" - a 3-lap sprint for the fastest 10 qualifiers, starting positions for the "dash" were drawn at random. Pole was taken by John Bowe and the overall round was won by Larry Perkins.

== Background ==
In pre-season testing, defending champion Mark Skaife sustained injuries which forced him out of the opening round. Gibson Motorsport made no effort to replace Skaife for this round, instead leaving Jim Richards as the sole Gibson Motorsport competitor on the grid for the weekend.

== Race results ==
=== Qualifying ===
Pos	No	Name	Team	Car	Time
1	18	(Australia) John Bowe	Dick Johnson Racing	Ford EF Falcon	1:12.810
2	17	(Australia) Dick Johnson	Dick Johnson Racing	Ford EF Falcon	1:13.110
3	30	(Australia) Glenn Seton	Glenn Seton Racing	Ford EF Falcon	1:13.270
4	11	(Australia) Larry Perkins	Perkins Engineering	Holden VR Commodore	1:13.410
5	4	(Australia) Wayne Gardner	Wayne Gardner Racing	Holden VR Commodore	1:13.590
6	015	(Australia) Tomas Mezera	Holden Racing Team	Holden VR Commodore	1:13.650
7	35	(Australia) Alan Jones	Glenn Seton Racing	Ford EF Falcon	1:13.660
8	2	(New Zealand) Jim Richards	Gibson Motorsport	Holden VR Commodore	1:13.900
9	7	(Australia) Neil Crompton	Wayne Gardner Racing	Holden VR Commodore	1:13.930
10	05	(Australia) Peter Brock	Holden Racing Team	Holden VR Commodore	1:13.980
11	25	(Australia) Tony Longhurst	Longhurst Racing	Ford EF Falcon	1:14.460
12	12	(Australia) Greg Crick	Perkins Engineering	Holden VP Commodore	1:15.180
13	6	(Australia) Allan Grice	Pinnacle Motorsport	Holden VP Commodore	1:15.310
14	47	(Australia) John Trimbole	Daily Planet Racing	Ford EB Falcon	1:15.490
15	3	(Australia) Steve Reed	Lansvale Racing Team	Holden VP Commodore	1:15.780
16	24	(Australia) Paul Romano	Romano Racing	Holden VP Commodore	1:16.100
17	49	(Australia) David Attard	Alcair Racing	Holden VP Commodore	1:16.390
18	38	(Australia) Mark Poole	James Rosenberg Racing	Holden VP Commodore	1:16.390
19	39	(Australia) Chris Smerdon	Challenge Motorsport	Holden VP Commodore	1:16.420
20	34	(Australia) Claude Giorgi	Claude Giorgi	Ford EB Falcon	1:20.570

=== Dash for Cash ===
Pos	No	Name	Team	Laps	Grid
1	2	(New Zealand) Jim Richards	Gibson Motorsport	3	1
2	015	(Australia) Tomas Mezera	Holden Racing Team	3	2
3	11	(Australia) Larry Perkins	Perkins Engineering	3	3
4	35	(Australia) Alan Jones	Glenn Seton Racing	3	4
5	30	(Australia) Glenn Seton	Glenn Seton Racing	3	8
6	18	(Australia) John Bowe	Dick Johnson Racing	3	6
7	17	(Australia) Dick Johnson	Dick Johnson Racing	3	5
8	05	(Australia) Peter Brock	Holden Racing Team	3	10
9	4	(Australia) Wayne Gardner	Wayne Gardner Racing	3	9
10	7	(Australia) Neil Crompton	Wayne Gardner Racing	3	6

=== Race 1 ===
Pos	No	Name	Team	Laps	Time/Retired	Grid
1	11	(Australia) Larry Perkins	Perkins Engineering	28	41min 22.719sec	4
2	4	(Australia) Wayne Gardner	Wayne Gardner Racing	28	+ 12.634 s	5
3	05	(Australia) Peter Brock	Holden Racing Team	28	+ 15.636 s	10
4	2	(New Zealand) Jim Richards	Gibson Motorsport	28	+ 28.171 s	8
5	18	(Australia) John Bowe	Dick Johnson Racing	28	+ 29.970 s	1
6	25	(Australia) Tony Longhurst	Longhurst Racing	28	+ 43.006 s	11
7	17	(Australia) Dick Johnson	Dick Johnson Racing	28	+ 56.566 s	2
8	38	(Australia) Mark Poole	James Rosenberg Racing	28	1:22.516 s	18
9	39	(Australia) Chris Smerdon	Challenge Motorsport	27	+ 1 lap	19
10	30	(Australia) Glenn Seton	Glenn Seton Racing	27	+ 1 lap	3
11	7	(Australia) Neil Crompton	Wayne Gardner Racing	27	+ 1 lap	9
12	12	(Australia) Greg Crick	Perkins Engineering	27	+ 1 lap	12
13	35	(Australia) Alan Jones	Glenn Seton Racing	27	+ 1 lap	7
14	47	(Australia) John Trimbole	Daily Planet Racing	26	+ 2 laps	14
15	49	(Australia) David Attard	Alcair Racing	26	+ 2 laps	26
16	34	(Australia) Claude Giorgi	Claude Giorgi Racing	25	+ 3 laps	20
17	24	(Australia) Paul Romano	Romano Racing	24	+ 4 laps	16
Ret	015	(Australia) Tomas Mezera	Holden Racing Team	11	Steering	6
Ret	6	(Australia) Allan Grice	Pinnacle Motorsport	10	Accident	13
Ret	3	(Australia) Steve Reed	Lansvale Racing Team	6	Accident	15
Fastest lap: Larry Perkins (Perkins Engineering) - 1:25.799

=== Race 2 ===
Pos	No	Name	Team	Laps	Time/Retired	Grid
1	18	(Australia) John Bowe	Dick Johnson Racing	28	39min 20.270sec	5
2	11	(Australia) Larry Perkins	Perkins Engineering	28	+ 6.915 s	1
3	4	(Australia) Wayne Gardner	Wayne Gardner Racing	28	+ 25.841	2
4	17	(Australia) Dick Johnson	Dick Johnson Racing	28	+ 36.168 s	7
5	7	(Australia) Neil Crompton	Wayne Gardner Racing	28	+ 47.291 s	11
6	015	(Australia) Tomas Mezera	Holden Racing Team	28	+ 59.146 s	18
7	12	(Australia) Greg Crick	Perkins Engineering	28	+ 1:01.474 s	12
8	05	(Australia) Peter Brock	Holden Racing Team	28	+ 1:03.167 s	3
9	2	(New Zealand) Jim Richards	Gibson Motorsport	28	+ 1:10.916 s	4
10	6	(Australia) Allan Grice	Pinnacle Motorsport	28	+ 1:22.753 s	19
11	3	(Australia) Steve Reed	Lansvale Racing Team	27	+ 1 lap	20
12	35	(Australia) Alan Jones	Glenn Seton Racing	27	+ 1 lap	13
13	49	(Australia) David Attard	Alcair Racing	27	+ 1 lap	15
14	25	(Australia) Tony Longhurst	Longhurst Racing	27	+ 1 lap	6
15	47	(Australia) John Trimbole	Daily Planet Racing	26	+ 2 laps	14
16	24	(Australia) Paul Romano	Romano Racing	26	+ 2 laps	17
17	38	(Australia) Mark Poole	James Rosenberg Racing	25	+ 3 laps	8
18	34	(Australia) Claude Giorgi	Claude Giorgi Racing	23	+ 5 laps	16
Ret	39	(Australia) Chris Smerdon	Challenge Motorsport	0	Accident	9
Ret	30	(Australia) Glenn Seton	Glenn Seton Racing	0	Accident	10
Fastest lap: Tomas Mezera (Holden Racing Team) - 1:21.563

== Championship standings after the event ==
- After Round 1 of 10. Only the top five positions are included.

Drivers' Championship standings

Pos.	Driver	Points
1	(Australia) Larry Perkins	37
2	(Australia) Wayne Gardner	30
3	(Australia) John Bowe	30
4	(Australia) Peter Brock	20
5	(Australia) Dick Johnson	18
