= 1995 ATCC Launceston round =

(Tasmania) 1995 ATCC Round 2
Event Information
- Round 2 of 10 in the 1995 Australian Touring Car Championship
- Date: 24–26 February 1995
- Location: Launceston, Tasmania
- Venue: Symmons Plains Raceway
- Weather: Fine

Results
Race 1
Distance	38 laps	91 km
Pole position	John Bowe; Dick Johnson Racing	0:54.848
Winner	John Bowe; Dick Johnson Racing	35:52
Race 2
Distance	38 laps	91 km
Winner	Peter Brock; Mobil Holden Racing Team	35:29
Round Results
First	John Bowe; Dick Johnson Racing	39 pts
Second	Peter Brock; Mobil Holden Racing Team	32 pts
Third	Tomas Mezera; Mobil Holden Racing Team	30 pts

The second round of the 1995 Australian Touring Car Championship was held on the weekend of 24 to 26 February at Symmons Plains Raceway in Launceston, Tasmania. It consisted of two 38 lap races and the "Dash for Cash", a 3 lap sprint for the fastest 10 qualifiers, starting positions for the "dash" were drawn at random. Pole and the overall round was won by John Bowe. Peter Brock had his 50th Birthday on race day and won the second race, finishing second overall while team-mate Tomas Mezera finished third overall.

== Race results ==
=== Qualifying ===
Pos	No	Name	Car	Team	Time
1	18	(Australia) John Bowe	Dick Johnson Racing	Ford EF Falcon	54.840
2	1	(Australia) Mark Skaife	Gibson Motorsport	Holden VR Commodore	55.010
3	30	(Australia) Glenn Seton	Glenn Seton Racing	Ford EF Falcon	55.080
4	11	(Australia) Larry Perkins	Perkins Engineering	Holden VR Commodore	55.110
5	17	(Australia) Dick Johnson	Dick Johnson Racing	Ford EF Falcon	55.240
6	015	(Australia) Tomas Mezera	Holden Racing Team	Holden VR Commodore	55.240
7	05	(Australia) Peter Brock	Holden Racing Team	Holden VR Commodore	55.320
8	7	(Australia) Neil Crompton	Wayne Gardner Racing	Holden VR Commodore	55.350
9	2	(New Zealand) Jim Richards	Gibson Motorsport	Holden VR Commodore	55.510
10	4	(Australia) Wayne Gardner	Wayne Gardner Racing	Holden VR Commodore	55.580
11	35	(Australia) Alan Jones	Glenn Seton Racing	Ford EF Falcon	55.630
12	49	(Australia) David Attard	Alcair Racing	Holden VP Commodore	56.620
13	12	(Australia) Greg Crick	Perkins Engineering	Holden VP Commodore	56.730
14	24	(Australia) Paul Romano	Romano Racing	Holden VP Commodore	57.090
15	47	(Australia) John Trimbole	Daily Planet Racing	Ford EB Falcon	57.680
16	88	(Australia) Bill O'Brien	Bill O'Brien Racing	Holden VL Commodore SS Group A SV	1:01.010
17	25	(Australia) Tony Longhurst	Longhurst Racing	Ford EF Falcon	no time

=== Dash for Cash ===
Pos	No	Name	Team	Laps	Grid
1	17	(Australia) Dick Johnson	Dick Johnson Racing	3	2
2	11	(Australia) Larry Perkins	Perkins Engineering	3	4
3	1	(Australia) Mark Skaife	Gibson Motorsport	3	1
4	2	(New Zealand) Jim Richards	Gibson Motorsport	3	3
5	18	(Australia) John Bowe	Dick Johnson Racing	3	8
6	7	(Australia) Neil Crompton	Wayne Gardner Racing	3	5
7	015	(Australia) Tomas Mezera	Holden Racing Team	3	6
8	05	(Australia) Peter Brock	Holden Racing Team	3	7
9	4	(Australia) Wayne Gardner	Wayne Gardner Racing	3	9
10	30	(Australia) Glenn Seton	Glenn Seton Racing	3	10

=== Race 1 ===
Pos	No	Name	Team	Laps	Time/Retired	Grid
1	18	(Australia) John Bowe	Dick Johnson Racing	38	35:52	1
2	015	(Australia) Tomas Mezera	Holden Racing Team	38	35:55	6
3	30	(Australia) Glenn Seton	Glenn Seton Racing	38	35:58	3
4	05	(Australia) Peter Brock	Holden Racing Team	38	36:01	7
5	35	(Australia) Alan Jones	Glenn Seton Racing	38	36:12	13
6	7	(Australia) Neil Crompton	Wayne Gardner Racing	38	36:23	8
7	4	(Australia) Wayne Gardner	Wayne Gardner Racing	38	36:25	10
8	25	(Australia) Tony Longhurst	Longhurst Racing	38	36:36	17
9	49	(Australia) David Attard	Alcair Racing	38	36:39	12
10	47	(Australia) John Trimbole	Daily Planet Racing	37	+ 1 lap	15
11	24	(Australia) Paul Romano	Romano Racing	27	+ 1 lap	14
12	2	(New Zealand) Jim Richards	Gibson Motorsport	37	+ 1 lap	9
13	1	(Australia) Mark Skaife	Gibson Motorsport	37	+ 1 lap	2
14	88	(Australia) Bill O'Brien	Bill O'Brien Racing	37	+ 1 lap	16
Ret	17	(Australia) Dick Johnson	Dick Johnson Racing	19	Radiator	5
Ret	12	(Australia) Greg Crick	Perkins Engineering	19	Retired	13
Ret	11	(Australia) Larry Perkins	Perkins Engineering	14	Steering	4
Fastest lap: Dick Johnson (Dick Johnson Racing) - 55.523

=== Race 2 ===
Pos	No	Name	Team	Laps	Time/Retired	Grid
1	05	(Australia) Peter Brock	Holden Racing Team	38	35:29	4
2	18	(Australia) John Bowe	Dick Johnson Racing	38	35:34	1
3	015	(Australia) Tomas Mezera	Holden Racing Team	38	35:39	2
4	7	(Australia) Neil Crompton	Wayne Gardner Racing	38	35:43	7
5	11	(Australia) Larry Perkins	Perkins Engineering	38	35:50	16
6	4	(Australia) Wayne Gardner	Wayne Gardner Racing	38	35:52	7
7	2	(New Zealand) Jim Richards	Gibson Motorsport	38	36:00	12
8	25	(Australia) Tony Longhurst	Longhurst Racing	38	36:14	8
9	49	(Australia) David Attard	Alcair Racing	38	36:14	9
10	1	(Australia) Mark Skaife	Gibson Motorsport	38	36:14	13
11	35	(Australia) Alan Jones	Glenn Seton Racing	38	36:19	5
12	12	(Australia) Greg Crick	Perkins Engineering	37	+ 1 lap	15
13	24	(Australia) Paul Romano	Romano Racing	27	+ 1 lap	11
14	17	(Australia) Dick Johnson	Dick Johnson Racing	37	+ 1 lap	14
15	47	(Australia) John Trimbole	Daily Planet Racing	32	+ 7 laps	10
Ret	30	(Australia) Glenn Seton	Peter Jackson Racing	2	Engine	3
DNS	88	(Australia) Bill O'Brien	Bill O'Brien Racing		Did Not Start	
Fastest lap: John Bowe (Dick Johnson Racing) - 54.772

== Championship standings after the event ==
- After Round 2 of 10. Only the top five positions are included.

Drivers' Championship standings

	Pos.	Driver	Points
2	1	(Australia) John Bowe	69
1	2	(Australia) Peter Brock	52
2	3	(Australia) Larry Perkins	51
2	4	(Australia) Wayne Gardner	44
3	5	(Australia) Tomas Mezera	40
