= 1995 Australian Touring Car Championship =

Motor racing competition

Seasons
- ← 1994 1996 →

The 1995 Australian Touring Car Championship was a CAMS sanctioned Australian motor racing title for 5.0 Litre Touring Cars complying with Group 3A regulations. The championship, which was the 36th Australian Touring Car Championship, was contested over a ten rounds between February and August 1995. The series was won by John Bowe driving a Dick Johnson Racing Ford EF Falcon.

== Television coverage ==
Channel 7's 1995 coverage was led by Mike Raymond for the final time before his retirement from full-time broadcasting and he was once again joined by Allan Moffat and Mark Oastler in the broadcast booth with Andy Raymond in pit-lane.

The broadcast was again on same-day delay due to the network's coverage of the AFL across the nation.

== Pre-season ==
The Ford EF Falcon and Holden VR Commodore were both homologated for competition. The changes were largely cosmetic, allowing teams to reskin their existing EB Falcons and VP Commodores. With no material gain in performance expected, many of the privateer teams elected to retain their cars in EB and VP trim.

In January 1995 Dunlop, who supplied tyres to Dick Johnson Racing, Perkins Engineering and Wayne Gardner Racing as well as all of the privateer teams, had their factory in Kobe destroyed in the Great Hanshin earthquake. While production was shifted to England, teams had to ration their tyre stocks. To help the situation, Bridgestone later relaxed its policy of only supplying contracted teams, providing tyres to James Rosenberg Racing and Romano Racing at the final round.

Defending champion Mark Skaife missed the opening round of the championship after sustaining injuries in a testing accident ahead of the Winfield Triple Challenge at Eastern Creek that destroyed a Gibson Motorsport VR Commodore.

== Teams and drivers ==
Movements

- Greg Crick, having severed his relationship with Pinnacle Motorsport, purchased Larry Perkins' 1994 VP Commodore, he would only contest the first two rounds, later selling the car to M3 Motorsport
- Daily Planet Racing switched manufacturers, selling its VP Commodore and purchasing a Dick Johnson Racing EB Falcon

Arrivals / returnees

- Alcair Racing entered the series with David Attard driving Paul Morris' 1994 VP Commodore, contesting all rounds
- James Rosenberg Racing entered the series with Mark Poole driving the 1993 Bathurst 1000 winning VP Commodore purchased from Daily Planet Racing
- Larkham Motor Sport entered the series with Mark Larkham debuting an EF Falcon at round 3
- Longhurst Racing entered the series after the shareholders in LoGaMo Racing decided to go in separate directions. Frank Gardner and Terry Morris wanted to compete in the Australian Super Touring Championship as the factory BMW team while Tony Longhurst wanted to remain in the V8 series. As a result, Gardner and Morris bought out Longhurst's share in Logamo, with Longhurst forming a new team to race an EF Falcon.
- Phil Ward Racing competed in a few rounds with an ex Advantage Racing VP Commodore, Phil Ward returning to the championship having last competed in 1990
- Pinnacle Motorsport signed Allan Grice for what was supposed to be his first full season since 1987, however after the team missed a couple of rounds, the arrangement had been terminated by the last round where Grice drove a third Glenn Seton Racing entry
- Romano Racing entered the series with Paul Romano driving Tony Longhurst's 1994 VP Commodore, contesting all rounds

Departures

- LoGaMo Racing withdrew from the series to concentrate on the Australian Super Touring Championship, thus Paul Morris did not compete
- 1994 Privateer's Champion Bob Jones did not defend his crown after major sponsor Ampol withdrew

The following drivers and teams competed in the 1995 Australian Touring Car Championship:

Team	Vehicle/s	No	Driver
Gibson Motorsport	Holden VR Commodore	1	(Australia) Mark Skaife
Gibson Motorsport	Holden VR Commodore	2	(New Zealand) Jim Richards
Lansvale Racing Team	Holden VP Commodore	3	(Australia) Trevor Ashby (Australia) Steve Reed
Wayne Gardner Racing	Holden VR Commodore	4	(Australia) Wayne Gardner
Wayne Gardner Racing	Holden VR Commodore	7	(Australia) Neil Crompton
Holden Racing Team	Holden VR Commodore	05	(Australia) Peter Brock
Holden Racing Team	Holden VR Commodore	015	(Australia) Tomas Mezera
Pinnacle Motorsport	Holden VP Commodore; Holden VR Commodore	6	(Australia) Allan Grice
Pinnacle Motorsport	Holden VP Commodore; Holden VR Commodore	21	(Australia) Tony Scott
Glenn Seton Racing	Ford EF Falcon	6	(Australia) Allan Grice
Glenn Seton Racing	Ford EF Falcon	30	(Australia) Glenn Seton
Glenn Seton Racing	Ford EB Falcon; Ford EF Falcon	35	(Australia) Alan Jones
Larkham Motor Sport	Ford EF Falcon	10	(Australia) Mark Larkham
Perkins Engineering	Holden VR Commodore	11	(Australia) Larry Perkins
Perkins Engineering	Holden VP Commodore	12	(Australia) Greg Crick
Phil Ward Racing	Holden VP Commodore; Holden VR Commodore	13	(Australia) Phil Ward
Dick Johnson Racing	Ford EF Falcon	17	(Australia) Dick Johnson
Dick Johnson Racing	Ford EF Falcon	18	(Australia) John Bowe
Dick Johnson Racing	Ford EF Falcon	19	(Australia) Steven Johnson
Palmer Promotions	Holden VR Commodore	20	(Australia) Ian Palmer
Romano Racing	Holden VP Commodore	24	(Australia) Paul Romano
Longhurst Racing	Ford EF Falcon	25	(Australia) Tony Longhurst
Terry Finnigan	Holden VP Commodore	27	(Australia) Terry Finnigan
Playscape Racing	Ford EB Falcon	28	(Australia) Kevin Waldock
Ian Love	Holden VR Commodore	31	(Australia) Ian Love
Pro-Duct Racing	Holden VP Commodore	33	(Australia) Bob Pearson
Claude Gorgi	Ford EB Falcon	34	(Australia) Claude Giorgi
Schembri Motorsport	Holden VP Commodore	36	(New Zealand) Neil Schembri
Schembri Motorsport	Holden VP Commodore	46	(Australia) Greg Young
Scotty Taylor Racing	Holden VP Commodore	37	(Australia) Bill Attard (Australia) Alan Taylor
James Rosenberg Racing	Holden VP Commodore	38	(Australia) Mark Poole
Challenge Motorsport	Holden VP Commodore; Holden VR Commodore	39	(Australia) Chris Smerdon
Group Motorsport	Holden VP Commodore	40	(Australia) George Ayoub
Garry Willmington Performance	Ford EB Falcon	41	(Australia) Garry Willmington
Daily Planet Racing	Ford EB Falcon	47	(Australia) John Trimbole
Alcair Racing	Holden VR Commodore	49	(Australia) David Attard
Parsons Transport	Holden VR Commodore	55	(Australia) David "Truckie" Parsons
Novocastrian Motorsport	Holden VP Commodore	62	(Australia) Wayne Russell
Pace Racing	Holden VP Commodore	74	(Australia) Kevin Heffernan
Barbagallo Motorsport	Holden VR Commodore	77	(Australia) Alf Barbagallo
Bill O'Brien	Holden VL Commodore SS Group A SV	88	(Australia) Bill O'Brien
Allan McCarthy	Holden VR Commodore	96	(Australia) Allan McCarthy

== Race calendar ==
The championship was contested over a ten-round series. Each round featured a "Peter Jackson Dash", a short sprint race which was restricted to the top ten cars from qualifying, and two main races which were open to all competitors. Unlike previous seasons, the dash did not set the grid order for the main races. The Amaroo Park round was replaced by a round at Mount Panorama which held an ATCC round for the first time since 1972.

Rd.	Circuit	Location / state	Date	Round winner	Car	Team	Report
1	Sandown International Raceway	Melbourne, Victoria	3 - 5 Feb	Larry Perkins	Holden VR Commodore	Perkins Engineering	Report
2	Symmons Plains Raceway	Launceston, Tasmania	24 - 26 Feb	John Bowe	Ford EF Falcon	Dick Johnson Racing	Report
3	Mount Panorama Circuit	Bathurst, New South Wales	10 - 12 Mar	John Bowe	Ford EF Falcon	Dick Johnson Racing	Report
4	Phillip Island Grand Prix Circuit	Phillip Island, Victoria	7 - 9 Apr	Glenn Seton	Ford EF Falcon	Glenn Seton Racing	
5	Lakeside International Raceway	Brisbane, Queensland	21 - 23 Apr	Glenn Seton	Ford EF Falcon	Glenn Seton Racing	
6	Winton Motor Raceway	Benalla, Victoria	19–21 May	John Bowe	Ford EF Falcon	Dick Johnson Racing	
7	Eastern Creek Raceway	Sydney, New South Wales	26–28 May	Mark Skaife	Holden VR Commodore	Gibson Motorsport	
8	Mallala Motor Sport Park	Mallala, South Australia	7 - 9 Jul	Glenn Seton	Ford EF Falcon	Glenn Seton Racing	
9	Barbagallo Raceway	Perth, Western Australia	14 - 16 Jul	Glenn Seton	Ford EF Falcon	Glenn Seton Racing	
10	Oran Park Raceway	Sydney, New South Wales	4 - 6 Aug	John Bowe	Ford EF Falcon	Dick Johnson Racing	

== Points system ==
- Championship points were awarded on a 3-2-1 basis for the first three places in the Peter Jackson Dash at each round.
- One bonus championship point was awarded for each position gained & held by a driver during the Peter Jackson Dash at each round.
- Championship points were awarded on a 20-16-14-12-10-8-6-4-2-1 basis for the first ten places in each of the two main races at each round.

== Results ==
Rounds were won by John Bowe (4), Glenn Seton (4), Larry Perkins (1) and Mark Skaife (1). Going into the final round Bowe, Seton and Peter Brock were in contention with Bowe prevailing.

=== Championship standings ===
Pos	Driver	Car	San	Sym	Mou	Phi	Lak	Win	Eas	Mal	Bar	Ora	Pts
1	John Bowe	Ford EF Falcon	30	39	35	20	38	40	22	32	16	42	314
2	Glenn Seton	Ford EF Falcon	4	14	24	31	40	32	20	43	46	33	287
3	Peter Brock	Holden VR Commodore	20	32	13	28	32	31	36	32	34	27	285
4	Larry Perkins	Holden VR Commodore	37	14	28	13	24	8	10	0	30	14	178
5	Tomas Mezera	Holden VR Commodore	10	30	20	3	22	21	7	18	20	12	163
6	Mark Skaife	Holden VR Commodore		2	32	8	15	6	39	13	18	16	149
7	Dick Johnson	Ford EF Falcon	18	4	27	10	13	8	2	26	10	18	136
8	Alan Jones	Ford EB Falcon; Ford EF Falcon	0	10	12	24	Ret	20	33	15	7	12	133
9	Wayne Gardner	Holden VR Commodore	30	14	Ret	4.5	5	7	16	0	4	3	83.5
10	Neil Crompton	Holden VR Commodore	10	20	Ret	3	1	14	18	0	7	2	76
11	Tony Longhurst	Ford EF Falcon	8	8	6	9	10	3	2	2	11	6	65
12	Jim Richards	Holden VR Commodore	17	6	DNS	0	2	4	8	10	12	Ret	59
13	Allan Grice	Holden VP Commodore; Holden VR Commodore; Ford EF Falcon	1				2		DNS			14	17
14	Trevor Ashby	Holden VP Commodore			1	6	1	0					8
15	Mark Poole	Holden VP Commodore	4		0	Ret				3			7
16	Greg Crick	Holden VP Commodore	6	0									6
=	Paul Romano	Holden VP Commodore	0	0	0	2	Ret	0	Ret	4	0	Ret	6
=	David Attard	Holden VP Commodore	0	4	0	0	0	0	Ret	Ret	1	1	6
19	Chris Smerdon	Holden VP Commodore; Holden VR Commodore	2			Ret				1			3
20	Tony Scott	Holden VP Commodore				2						0	2
21	John Trimbole	Ford EB Falcon	0	1	Ret	Ret	0	Ret	0	0	DNS		1
=	Phil Ward	Holden VP Commodore			1		Ret		0				1
Pos	Driver	Car	San	Sym	Mou	Phi	Lak	Win	Eas	Mal	Bar	Ora	Pts

Colour	Result
Gold	Winner
Silver	Second place
Bronze	Third place
Green	Points classification
Blue	Non-points classification
Blue	Non-classified finish (NC)
Purple	Retired, not classified (Ret)
Red	Did not qualify (DNQ)
Red	Did not pre-qualify (DNPQ)
Black	Disqualified (DSQ)
White	Did not start (DNS)
White	Withdrew (WD)
White	Race cancelled (C)
Blank	Did not practice (DNP)
Blank	Did not arrive (DNA)
Blank	Excluded (EX)

Note: Race 1 at the Phillip Island round was stopped before full race distance due to multiple accidents brought about by heavy rain, and only half points were awarded.

=== Privateers Cup ===
The Motorsport News / Dunlop Privateers Cup was won by David Attard.

== See also ==
1995 Australian Touring Car season
