= Wayne Gardner Racing =

- Team Principal: Wayne Gardner
- Debut: 1994
- Final Season: 1999
- Round wins: 1
- Pole positions: 0

Wayne Gardner Racing was an Australian motor racing team that competed in the Australian Touring Car Championship from 1994 until 1999.

== History ==
=== Formation ===
The team was created to further the motor sport career of 1987 World Motorcycle Champion, Wayne Gardner who retired from motor cycle racing at the end of the 1992 season. After racing with the Holden Racing Team in 1993, a falling out with team owner Tom Walkinshaw saw Gardner leave the team at season's end. In late 1993 Gardner purchased Bob Forbes Racing that had competed in the 1993 season with one VP Commodore driven by Neil Crompton. Initially operating out of Bob Forbes' Mona Vale premises the team relocated to Wetherill Park. Former Gibson Motorsport manager Alan Heaphy was appointed team manager. The team had backing from Coca-Cola, Holden and Dunlop.

=== 1994 ===
The team debuted at round 1 of the 1994 championship with a second VP Commodore built to complement Neil Crompton's 1993 car. Gardner and Crompton's combined in the former's #4 car for the endurance races while Win Percy and Russell Ingall raced #7, finishing fifth at the Bathurst 1000.

=== 1995 ===
Aside from upgrading its cars to VR specifications the team carries on unchanged in 1995. Brad Jones joined Percy in the #4 car for the endurance races with Gardner and Crompton sharing #7, finishing fifth and third at the Bathurst 1000.

=== 1996 ===
The team continued unchanged into 1996. Brad Jones filled in for an unavailable Gardner at the Indy support race before Crompton's car was benched due to budget constraints. Jones was joined by Tony Scott for the endurance races in #4 while Gardner and Crompton debuted a new car as #7 finishing 4th at the Bathurst 1000.

=== 1997 ===
For 1997 the team switched to Yokohama tyres and upgraded to VS specifications. Again only running one car now as #7, Gardner won the team's only round at the opening round at Calder Park. Crompton returned for the endurance races with Gardner leading at the Bathurst 1000 when the engine expired on lap 90. A second car was entered as a customer car for Peter Bradbury, Paul Stokell and Anthony Tratt as #54. At the end of 1997 Gardner decided to close down the team.

=== 1998 ===
Gardner retained one VS and with Melbourne based Paris Acott overseeing preparation, ran at selected high-profile events races in 1998 as #96 teaming with Paul Stokell for the endurance races.

=== 1999 ===
For 1999 Gardner purchased a Perkins Engineering customer Commodore VT and again entered select high-profile events as #19 with David Brabham co-driving at the Bathurst 1000. By 1999 Gardner was competing full-time in Japanese GT racing driving factory-supported Toyota Supras and at the end of the year sold the car and only appeared in Australia as a hired driver.

== Road cars ==
At the peak of the team's ability Gardner branched out into street car performance tuning, creating a set of bodykit and engine tune modifications for Commodore VR and VSs under the WGR Group A brand. It was to be short-lived with few cars sold.

== Drivers ==
Other than Wayne Gardner, those who drove for WGR include (in order of appearance):

- (Australia) Neil Crompton
- (United Kingdom) Win Percy
- (Australia) Russell Ingall
- (Australia) Brad Jones
- (Australia) Tony Scott
- (Australia) Paul Stokell
- (Australia) Peter Bradbury
- (Australia) Anthony Tratt
- (Australia) David Brabham
