= Neil Crompton =

Australian racing driver and commentator (born 1960)

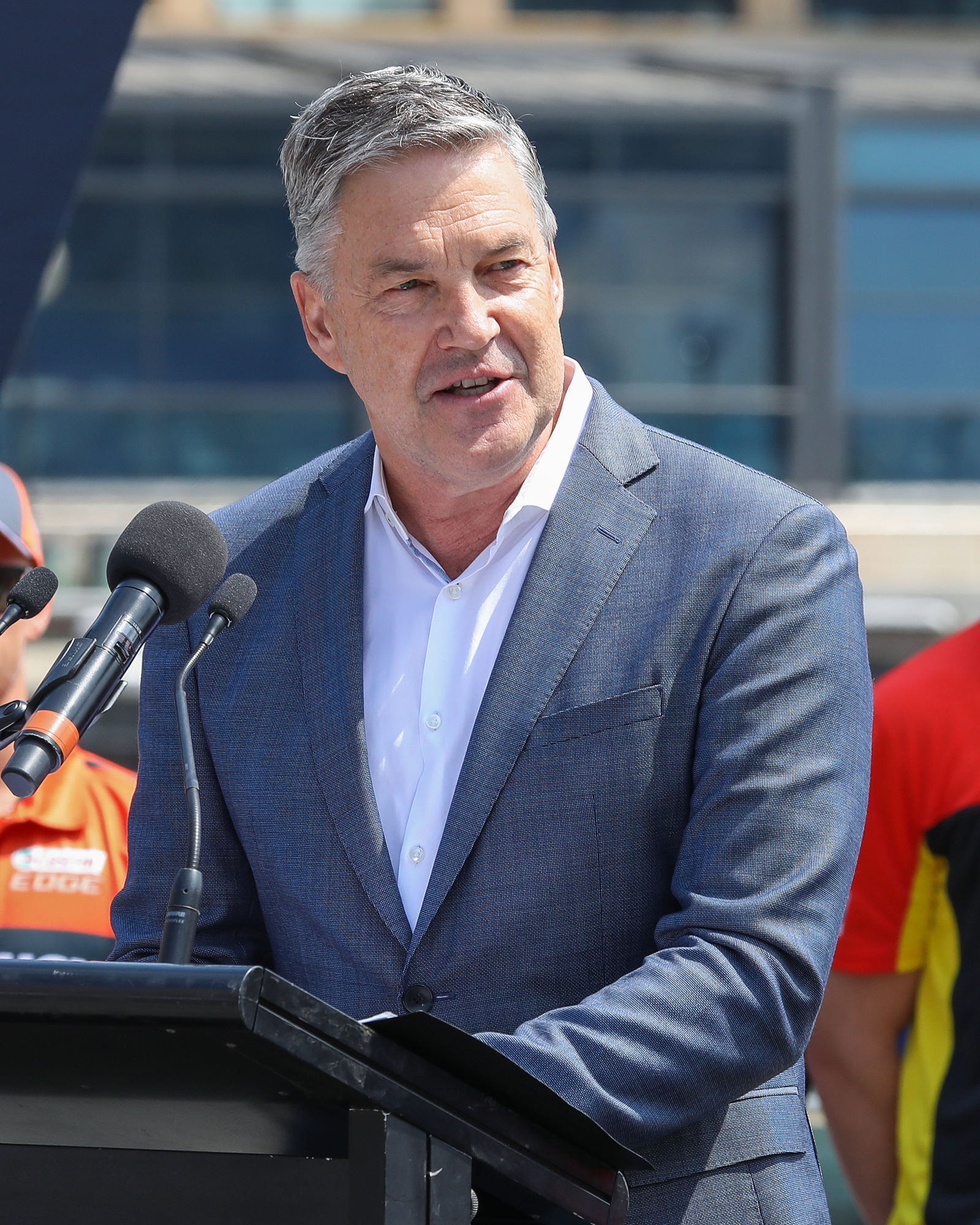
- Crompton in 2020
- Nationality: Australian
- Born: 30 July 1960 (age 66) Ballarat, Victoria
- Retired: 2002

ATCC / V8 Supercar
- Years active: 1987–2002
- Teams: Holden Dealer Team; Holden Racing Team; Advantage Racing; Bob Forbes Racing; Wayne Gardner Racing; Glenn Seton Racing; Gibson Motorsport
- Starts: 85
- Best finish: 10th in 1994 & 1995 Australian Touring Car Championship

Previous series
- 1989–92 1997 1998: Australian Drivers' Championship; North American Touring Car Championship; Australian GT Production Car Championship

Championship titles
- 1994: Bathurst 12 Hour

Neil Crompton (born 30 July 1960) is an Australian former racing driver and current Supercars presenter and commentator.

== Racing career ==
=== Highlights ===
According to the official V8 Supercars website, Crompton has competed in 357 various motor racing events, finishing in the first three places on 58 occasions. 230 of those races were with events counting towards the Australian Touring Car Championship (nowadays promoted as the Supercar Championship Series), including three second places and ten thirds.

Crompton has raced at Mount Panorama in Bathurst, New South Wales on more than 20 occasions dating back to his 1988 debut with Peter Brock's Mobil BMW Team. His best results being two third placings in the crash shortened 1992 race with Anders Olofsson in a Gibson Motorsport Nissan GT-R and in 1995 with Wayne Gardner in a Wayne Gardner Racing Holden Commodore VR in addition to winning the 1994 12 Hour endurance race with Gregg Hansford in a factory supported Mazda RX-7.

=== Early years ===
Crompton started racing in 1972 at age eleven on a Honda minibike before graduating to motocross where he had some success.

In 1985, Crompton moved to racing cars and has raced in various, mostly sedan-based categories, starting in a Series Production specification Mitsubishi Cordia. Racing categories that he has contested include V8 Supercars, Super Touring Cars, Group A Touring Cars, Sports Sedans, as well as the open-wheel categories of Formula Holden and Formula 3000.

Crompton's first big break in motor sport came when he was selected by Peter Brock as a driver in the Holden Dealer Team's second Group A VL Commodore for the long-distance races in late 1987. This included drives in the 1987 Sandown 500 at Sandown where he and Formula 2 ace Jon Crooke finished a creditable 4th, and later at the Bob Jane T-Marts 500 at Calder Park which was Round 9 of the 1987 World Touring Car Championship. He was to have made his Bathurst 1000 debut in 1987 a week before the race at Calder, but was one race short of gaining the appropriate FIA licence needed (he was reportedly to drive a Subaru in a Series Production race at Winton which would have secured the one needed signature for his licence, but the car was uncompetitive and he declined to drive as he "Didn't want to look like a wally", thus losing his chance). In a cruel twist, the #10 Commodore he was to have driven would go on to win the race in the hands of Brock, David Parsons, and his replacement for the race, Peter McLeod. Late in the Channel 7 telecast of the James Hardie 1000, his 'boss', lead commentator and producer of the telecast Mike Raymond, light heartedly pointed this out to Crompton when the Commodore was in third place behind the Eggenberger Motorsport Ford Sierra RS500s which would eventually be disqualified for technical irregularities. All Crompton could say in reply was "Don't remind me" and "The thought has crossed my mind".

Crompton remained with Brock's team for 1988, though by that time they had switched to running BMW M3s. He made his Australian Touring Car Championship debut that year, driving the third of the team's cars to eighth in Round 8 at Amaroo Park, and 9th in the final round at Oran Park. After a promising start to the endurance races with where he and David Parsons finished fourth in the Pepsi 250 at Oran Park (won by Brock and Jim Richards), he failed to finish at both Sandown and Bathurst.

In 1989, Crompton joined the Holden Racing Team, staying with them until the end of 1991. The HRT announced plans to run the new Holden VL Commodore SS Group A SV in the 1989 ATCC alongside former triple British Touring Car Champion Win Percy, but the team did not appear on the race track in the ATCC and would not race until that years Sandown 500.

Although he did not have a regular ATCC seat with HRT, Crompton co-drove the team's second Commodore in the three years with the team, though results were not forthcoming. He also started racing Formula Holden in 1989, finishing third in the Australian Drivers' Championship and scoring his first race win in Round 7 at Sydney's Amaroo Park circuit before going on to win the 10th and final round at Sandown in Melbourne. He scored his first pole position at Amaroo park with a time of 44.04, 3/10ths of a second under the outright circuit record set by John Bowe in the Veskanda-Chevrolet Sports car in 1986 and had hoped to break Bowe's lap record of 44.36 in the race. However, with the Gold Star race being held late on the day's program he was unable to do so as previous races had reportedly left a lot of oil on the circuit. At the end of the year, he drove in the Tea Tree Trophy Formula Holden support race at the 1989 Australian Grand Prix in Adelaide. There he qualified in fifth place and eventually finished in sixth.

Crompton continued to race the Peter Boylan owned, ex-Satoru Nakajima Ralt RT20 in the 1990 Australian Drivers' Championship, though results weren't as forthcoming with his best place being a second in Round 5 behind touring car rival Mark Skaife at Oran Park and finished fourth in the championship. He finished his 1990 Formula Holden season on a high note, qualifying his Ralt (complete with its usual Dulux Autocolour multi-coloured blue, yellow, red and green paint scheme that was not unlike that of the Formula One Benettons) on the front row and then driving it to victory in the Thalgo Trophy Formula Holden support race at the 1990 Australian Grand Prix.

In 1991, Crompton drove a 6 cyl Holden VN Commodore S with Peter Brock and motoring journalist/race driver Peter McKay to win Class C and finished fourth outright in the inaugural Bathurst 12 Hour. Unfortunately his Formula Holden season never got off the ground and he missed the 1991 series, though he did lease Simon Kane's car and went on to finish 3rd in the Formula Holden support race at the 1991 Australian Grand Prix.

Crompton returned to the Brock team for the first half of the 1992 ATCC, with a best finish of seventh in Round 3 at Symmons Plains. With the team short of funds to run two Holden VNs, Crompton left the team mid-season and returned to the Seven commentary booth, though he did drive in the final round of the 1992 Australian Drivers' Championship at Oran Park in Sydney where he finished in third place behind two future television co-commentators, series champion Mark Skaife and runner up Mark Larkham. He then joined Gibson Motorsport for the 1992 Bathurst 1000 in the team's second 4WD, twin turbo Nissan GT-R. In a race marred by heavy rain, accidents, and the death of 1967 Formula One World Champion Denny Hulme from a heart attack, Crompton and his Swedish co-driver Anders Olofsson finished 3rd in the crash shortened race, with Crompton giving the unruly crowd the finger from the podium on national television.

In 1993, Crompton ran the ATCC in one of the few Holden V8 powered VP Commodores in the field for Bob Forbes Racing (most of the top Holden teams were using the 5.0 L Chevrolet V8). His first full ATCC ended with a disappointing 13th-place finish in the standings. He then went to 1993 Bathurst 1000 where he qualified the car 10th after spinning on oil during his Tooheys Top 10 runoff lap. Crompton complained on camera after his lap that there was no warning of oil until he got to The Chase (the fastest corner on a race track anywhere in Australia taken at some 280 km/h (174 mph)), but it was later found that it was in fact his car that had dropped the oil and other drivers reported it to be all around the 6.213 km (3.861 mi) circuit.

In 1994, Crompton joined Wayne Gardner in Gardner's newly established Wayne Gardner Racing.

In 1997, Crompton headed to the US to compete in the new North American Touring Car Championship in a Honda Accord run by the Tasman Motorsports team. Crompton was quickly on the pace, and won several races and was in contention for the championship, before a disqualification (which he still disputes) precluded him from winning the title. Crompton also tested one of Tasman's Champ Cars at Gingerman Raceway.

=== Later years ===
In 1998, Crompton attained second place in the 1998 Century Batteries Three Hour Bathurst Showroom Showdown.

In 1998, Crompton started with Glenn Seton Racing, continuing with the team in its new identity as Ford Tickford Racing in 1999. He then moved to Gibson Motorsport, later renamed 00 Motorsport, in 2001 where he was teamed with Craig Lowndes before leaving at the end of the 2002 season.

Despite being a full-time television commentator, Crompton continues to compete in races when he can, particularly endurance races. Most recently he finished 17th in the 2009 Bathurst 12 Hour race, completing 222 laps (1,379 km / 857 miles) driving a Mitsubishi Lancer Evolution X with Glenn Seton. Crompton occasionally competes in the Aussie Racing Cars series and has also competed in the Australian Rally Championship.

Crompton also competed in the 2003 Bathurst 24 Hour driving a 5.0 L V8 powered BMW M3 GTR for Australian Nations Cup Championship team Prancing Horse Racing. The car (co-driven by John Bowe, Greg Crick and Maher Algadrie), which had only arrived from the United States a week before the race, qualified in third place but failed to finish after Algadrie hit the wall on top of Mount Panorama following a clash with the race winning Holden Monaro 427C of Peter Brock on its 131st lap.

Crompton also works on the organisational side of V8 Supercar, contributing to TEGA's Parity Board, which works to ensure that none of the competing marques gain any significant advantage over the other.

== Media career ==
Crompton started commentating at motocross events for Network Ten, then known as the 0/10 Network. He then worked for the ABC from around 1980 until the end of 1984, generally working with respected commentators Will Hagon, John Smailes and Drew Morphett, and commentating on motorsport events such as the Australian Touring Car Championship (ATCC) plus various other motorsport events that the network covered such as the Sandown 500. In 1985 when the ATCC rights moved to Channel Seven, Crompton also moved across to Seven, replacing Evan Green and joining the network's motorsport regulars Mike Raymond & Garry Wilkinson in the commentary box, while also doing regular reporting from the pits. As the junior member of the team, and by far the fittest, Crompton was often assigned pit duties on race day which regularly required quickly moving from one end of pit lane to the other, though from 1987 with his racing commitments starting to take precedence, Seven also brought in motoring journalist and race driver Peter McKay as a commentator and pit reporter. He would stay with the network in a gradually decreasing capacity (mostly due to his racing commitments) until the end of 1995, his latter years there including regular segments on the TV program The Great Outdoors. During this time he also had segments on the Triple M radio network.

In 1996, Crompton returned to Network Ten to be their "motorsport expert" for their coverage of the CART Series & Australian Super Touring Championship for which they had just gained the broadcasting rights, and which would also end up including Formula One. Crompton was a regular presenter of Ten's popular motoring magazine program, RPM, and after his racing career wound down at the end of 2002 until the end of 2006, he was the expert commentator on Ten's coverage of the V8 Supercars (after being lead commentator throughout 2001 when he only drove in endurance races).

When the Seven Network bought the television broadcasting rights for the V8 Supercars for 2007 onwards, Crompton, along with a majority of the production team, moved to Seven. Crompton's detailed technical knowledge, combined with his racing and commentating experience, ensures that he is considered an extremely valuable part of the Seven Network's coverage of the series.

Crompton also co-hosted the popular web show "The Panelbeaters" with longtime friend Brad Jones. The show ran every Friday evening before a V8 Supercar meeting, and the Wednesday after. The show began as a radio programme in 2003 on Victorian station SEN 1116, before being taken on by Telstra Bigpond, and made into a video web show. The program was axed after the 2008 season.

After a short time off the radio waves, Crompton returned to broadcasting on radio this time with former Australian V8 Supercar champion Mark Skaife on The Stick Shift, a motoring based show broadcast on the Triple M network on Saturday mornings.

In 2014, Crompton hosted the Shannons Legends of Motorsport television program on 7mate. The series, of which he is also the executive producer, features Crompton interviewing several major figures from the history of touring car racing in Australia. For the second season in 2015, Crompton moved to solely an off-camera role.

In 2015, the V8 Supercars broadcast rights moved to a shared deal between Foxtel and a return to Network Ten. Crompton followed the new deal, but instead of a hosting and commentating role as he had previously with Seven, now works predominantly as a commentator.

== Personal life ==
Crompton married long time partner Sarah Mathewson in March 2008. Crompton has a daughter, Sienna.

In April 2021, Crompton was diagnosed with prostate cancer. He was expected to make a full recovery following surgery.

== Career results ==
Results sourced from Driver Database.

Season	Series	Position	Car	Team
1988	Australian Touring Car Championship	20th	BMW M3	Mobil 1 Racing
1988	James Hardie Building Products AMSCAR Series	6th	BMW M3	Mobil 1 Racing
1988	Asia-Pacific Touring Car Championship	8th	BMW M3	Mobil 1 Racing
1989	Australian Drivers' Championship	3rd	Ralt RT20 Holden	Boylan Racing
1990	Australian Drivers' Championship	4th	Ralt RT20 Holden	Boylan Racing
1990	Australian Touring Car Championship	15th	Holden VL Commodore SS Group A SV	Holden Racing Team
1990	Australian Endurance Championship	20th	Holden VL Commodore SS Group A SV	Holden Racing Team
1992	Australian Touring Car Championship	15th	Holden VN Commodore SS Group A SV	Advantage Racing
1992	Australian Drivers' Championship	10th	Ralt RT20 Holden	Boylan Racing
1993	Australian Touring Car Championship	13th	Holden VP Commodore	Bob Forbes Racing
1993	Aurora AFX AMSCAR Series	4th	Holden VP Commodore	Bob Forbes Racing
1994	Australian Touring Car Championship	10th	Holden VP Commodore	Wayne Gardner Racing
1995	Australian Touring Car Championship	10th	Holden VR Commodore	Wayne Gardner Racing
1996	Mobil New Zealand Sprints	6th	Holden VR Commodore	Wayne Gardner Racing
1996	Australian Touring Car Championship	13th	Holden VR Commodore	Wayne Gardner Racing
1997	North American Touring Car Championship	3rd	Honda Accord	Tasman Motorsports
1998	Australian GT Production Car Championship	9th	Ferrari F355 Challenge	Ross Palmer Motorsport
1998	Australian Touring Car Championship	24th	Ford EL Falcon	Glenn Seton Racing
1999	Shell Championship Series	12th	Ford EL Falcon; Ford AU Falcon	Glenn Seton Racing
2000	Shell Championship Series	12th	Ford AU Falcon	Glenn Seton Racing
2001	Shell Championship Series	54th	Ford AU Falcon	Gibson Motorsport
2002	V8 Supercar Championship Series	17th	Ford AU Falcon	00 Motorsport
2007	Aussie Racing Cars Super Series	43rd	AU Falcon	ARC Team
2008	Aussie Racing Cars Super Series	51st	Aurion	TRD Racing
2009	Aussie Racing Cars Super Series	16th	Aurion	Toyota Stars
2015	Touring Car Masters (Pro Masters Class)	11th	Ford Mustang	Dunlop Super Dealers / Wilson Security

=== Complete Australian Touring Car Championship results ===
(key) (Races in bold indicate pole position) (Races in italics indicate fastest lap)

Year	Team	Car	1	2	3	4	5	6	7	8	9	10	11	12	13	14	15	16	17	18	19	20	21	22	23	24	25	26	27	28	29	30	31	32	33	34	35	DC	Points
1988	Mobil 1 Racing	BMW M3	CAL	SYM	WIN	WAN	AIR	LAK	SAN	AMA; 8	ORA; 11																											20th	3
1990	Holden Racing Team	Holden VL Commodore SS Group A SV	AMA	SYM	PHI	WIN	LAK	MAL; 6	WAN	ORA																												15th	6
1992	Advantage Racing	Holden VN Commodore SS Group A SV	AMA; R1; Ret	AMA; R2; WD	SAN; R3; 11	SAN; R4; 6	SYM; R5; 8	SYM; R6; 7	WIN; R7; Ret	WIN; R8; WD	LAK; R9	LAK; R10	EAS; R11	EAS; R12	MAL; R13	MAL; R14	BAR; R15	BAR; R16	ORA; R17	ORA; R18																		18th	28
1993	Bob Forbes Racing	Holden VP Commodore	AMA; R1; DNS	AMA; R2; 11	AMA; R3; 10	SYM; R4; 9	SYM; R5; 7	PHI; R6; 10	PHI; R7; Ret	LAK; R8; 9	LAK; R9; 10	WIN; R10; 8	WIN; R11; 9	EAS; R12; Ret	EAS; R13; 13	MAL; R14; 11	MAL; R15; 11	BAR; R16; 3	BAR; R17; 3	ORA; R18; 6	ORA; R19; 6																	13th	37
1994	Wayne Gardner Racing	Holden VP Commodore	AMA; R1; 16	AMA; R2; 11	SAN; R3; 11	SAN; R4; 20	SYM; R5; 7	SYM; R6; 13	PHI; R7; 5	PHI; R8; 9	LAK; R9; 9	LAK; R10; 9	WIN; R11; 4	WIN; R12; 4	EAS; R13; 14	EAS; R14; 12	MAL; R15; 4	MAL; R16; Ret	BAR; R17; 10	BAR; R18; 6	ORA; R19; 7	ORA; R20; 4																10th	77
1995	Wayne Gardner Racing	Holden VR Commodore	SAN; R1; 11	SAN; R2; 5	SYM; R3; 6	SYM; R4; 4	BAT; R5; Ret	BAT; R6; DNS	PHI; R7; 7	PHI; R8; 12	LAK; R9; 10	LAK; R10; 11	WIN; R11; 4	WIN; R12; 10	EAS; R13; 5	EAS; R14; 6	MAL; R15; Ret	MAL; R16; 13	BAR; R17; Ret	BAR; R18; 10	ORA; R19; 9	ORA; R20; Ret																10th	76
1996	Wayne Gardner Racing	Holden VR Commodore	EAS; R1; 7	EAS; R2; 2	EAS; R3; 15	SAN; R4; Ret	SAN; R5; 12	SAN; R6; 7	BAT; R7; 10	BAT; R8; 4	BAT; R9; 6	SYM; R10; 5	SYM; R11; 3	SYM; R12; 14	PHI; R13	PHI; R14	PHI; R15	CAL; R16	CAL; R17	CAL; R18	LAK; R19	LAK; R20	LAK; R21	BAR; R22	BAR; R23	BAR; R24	MAL; R25	MAL; R26	MAL; R27	ORA; R28; 14	ORA; R29; 12	ORA; R30; Ret						13th	73
1998	Glenn Seton Racing	Ford EL Falcon	SAN; R1	SAN; R2	SAN; R3	SYM; R4	SYM; R5	SYM; R6	LAK; R7	LAK; R8	LAK; R9	PHI; R10	PHI; R11	PHI; R12	WIN; R13	WIN; R14	WIN; R15	MAL; R16; Ret	MAL; R17; 12	MAL; R18; 10	BAR; R19	BAR; R20	BAR; R21	CAL; R22; 8	CAL; R23; 14	CAL; R24; C	HDV; R25	HDV; R26	HDV; R27	ORA; R28; 7	ORA; R29; Ret	ORA; R30; 11						24th	116
1999	Glenn Seton Racing	Ford EL Falcon Ford AU Falcon	EAS; R1; Ret	EAS; R2; Ret	EAS; R3; 16	ADE; R4; 13	BAR; R5; 5	BAR; R6; 5	BAR; R7; Ret	PHI; R8; Ret	PHI; R9; 22	PHI; R10; 24	HDV; R11; 6	HDV; R12; 24	HDV; R13; Ret	SAN; R14; Ret	SAN; R15; 19	SAN; R16; 15	QLD; R17; 8	QLD; R18; 8	QLD; R19; 3	CAL; R20; 6	CAL; R21; WD	CAL; R22; WD	SYM; R23; 3	SYM; R24; 3	SYM; R25; Ret	WIN; R26; 25	WIN; R27; 14	WIN; R28; 9	ORA; R29; 8	ORA; R30; 19	ORA; R31; 26	QLD; R32; 4	BAT; R33; 5			12th	1107
2000	Glenn Seton Racing	Ford AU Falcon	PHI; R1; 4	PHI; R2; 23	BAR; R3; 21	BAR; R4; 21	BAR; R5; Ret	ADE; R6; Ret	ADE; R7; 12	EAS; R8; 9	EAS; R9; 9	EAS; R10; 6	HDV; R11; 18	HDV; R12; 10	HDV; R13; 8	CAN; R14; 9	CAN; R15; 2	CAN; R16; 6	QLD; R17; 19	QLD; R18; 17	QLD; R19; 12	WIN; R20; 3	WIN; R21; 19	WIN; R22; 8	ORA; R23; 18	ORA; R24; 20	ORA; R25; 12	CAL; R26; 12	CAL; R27; 10	CAL; R28; Ret	QLD; R29; 7	SAN; R30; 13	SAN; R31; 12	SAN; R32; 8	BAT; R33; 13			12th	829
2001	Gibson Motorsport	Ford AU Falcon	PHI; R1	PHI; R2	ADE; R3	ADE; R4	EAS; R5	EAS; R6	HDV; R7	HDV; R8	HDV; R9	CAN; R10	CAN; R11	CAN; R12	BAR; R13	BAR; R14	BAR; R15	CAL; R16	CAL; R17	CAL; R18	ORA; R19	ORA; R20	QLD; R21; Ret	WIN; R22	WIN; R23	BAT; R24; 17	PUK; R25	PUK; R26	PUK; R27	SAN; R28	SAN; R29	SAN; R30						54th	208
2002	00 Motorsport	Ford AU Falcon	ADE; R1; Ret	ADE; R2; Ret	PHI; R3; 16	PHI; R4; 13	EAS; R5; 18	EAS; R6; 12	EAS; R7; 14	HDV; R8; Ret	HDV; R9; 13	HDV; R10; 15	CAN; R11; 12	CAN; R12; 24	CAN; R13; 16	BAR; R14; 13	BAR; R15; 6	BAR; R16; 18	ORA; R17; 7	ORA; R18; 10	WIN; R19; 13	WIN; R20; 18	QLD; R21; 6	BAT; R22; Ret	SUR; R23; 23	SUR; R24; 13	PUK; R25; 15	PUK; R26; 7	PUK; R27; 15	SAN; R28; 12	SAN; R29; Ret							17th	569

=== Complete World Touring Car Championship results ===
(key) (Races in bold indicate pole position) (Races in italics indicate fastest lap)

Year	Team	Car	1	2	3	4	5	6	7	8	9	10	11	DC	Points
1987	(Australia) Holden Dealer Team	Holden VL Commodore SS Group A	MNZ	JAR	DIJ	NUR	SPA	BNO	SIL	BAT	CLD ovr:11 cls:7	WEL; Ret	FJI	NC	0

† Not registered for series & points

=== Complete Asia-Pacific Touring Car Championship results ===
(key) (Races in bold indicate pole position) (Races in italics indicate fastest lap)

Year	Team	Car	1	2	3	4	DC	Points
1988	(Australia) Mobil 1 Racing	BMW M3	BAT; Ret	WEL; Ret	PUK; 4	FJI	8th	25

=== Complete Bathurst 1000 results ===
Year	Car#	Team	Co-drivers	Car	Class	Laps	Pos.	Class pos.
1988	56	(Australia) Mobil 1 Racing	(Australia) Peter Brock (New Zealand) Jim Richards	BMW M3	B	89	DNF	DNF
1989	7	(Australia) Holden Racing Team	(United Kingdom) Win Percy	Holden VL Commodore SS Group A SV	A	158	7th	7th
1990	7	(Australia) Holden Racing Team	(Australia) Brad Jones	Holden VL Commodore SS Group A SV	1	159	5th	5th
1991	7	(Australia) Holden Racing Team	(Australia) Brad Jones	Holden VN Commodore SS Group A SV	1	100	DNF	DNF
1992	2	(Australia) Gibson Motorsport	(Sweden) Anders Olofsson	Nissan Skyline R32 GT-R	A	143	3rd	3rd
1993	7	(Australia) Bob Forbes Racing	(Australia) Mark Gibbs	Holden VP Commodore	A	125	DNF	DNF
1994	4	(Australia) Wayne Gardner Racing	(Australia) Wayne Gardner	Holden VP Commodore	A	99	DNF	DNF
1995	7	(Australia) Wayne Gardner Racing	(Australia) Wayne Gardner	Holden VR Commodore		161	3rd	3rd
1996	7	(Australia) Wayne Gardner Racing	(Australia) Wayne Gardner	Holden VR Commodore		160	4th	4th
1997*	26	(United Kingdom) Esso Ultron Team Peugeot	(United Kingdom) Patrick Watts	Peugeot 406		112	DNF	DNF
1997	7	(Australia) Wayne Gardner Racing	(Australia) Wayne Gardner	Holden VS Commodore		89	DNF	DNF
1998	5	(Australia) Glenn Seton Racing	(Australia) Glenn Seton	Ford EL Falcon	OC	160	5th	5th
1999	5	(Australia) Glenn Seton Racing	(Australia) Glenn Seton	Ford AU Falcon		161	5th	5th
2000	5	(Australia) Glenn Seton Racing	(Australia) Glenn Seton	Ford AU Falcon		158	13th	13th
2001	00	(Australia) Gibson Motorsport	(Australia) Craig Lowndes	Ford AU Falcon		156	17th	17th
2002	00	(Australia) 00 Motorsport	(Australia) Craig Lowndes	Ford AU Falcon		127	DNF	DNF

* Denotes Super Touring race.

=== Complete Sandown 500 results ===
Year	Team	Co-drivers	Car	Class	Laps	Pos.	Class pos.
1987	(Australia) Holden Dealer Team	(Australia) Jon Crooke	Holden VL Commodore SS Group A	A	126	4th	**3rd**
1988	(Australia) Mobil 1 Racing	(Australia) David Parsons (Australia) Peter Brock	BMW M3	B	58	DNF	DNF
1989	(Australia) Holden Racing Team	(Australia) Steve Harrington	Holden VL Commodore SS Group A SV	A	155	6th	6th
1990	(Australia) Holden Racing Team	(United Kingdom) Win Percy	Holden VL Commodore SS Group A SV	Div.1	32	DNF	DNF
1991	(Australia) Holden Racing Team	(Australia) Brad Jones	Holden VN Commodore SS Group A SV	A	103	DNF	DNF
1993	(Australia) Bob Forbes Racing	(Australia) Mark Gibbs	Holden VP Commodore	V8	61	DNF	DNF
1994	(Australia) Wayne Gardner Racing	(Australia) Wayne Gardner	Holden VP Commodore	V8	27	DNF	DNF
1995	(Australia) Wayne Gardner Racing	(Australia) Wayne Gardner	Holden VR Commodore		139	DNF	DNF
1996	(Australia) Wayne Gardner Racing	(Australia) Wayne Gardner	Holden VR Commodore		159	7th	7th
1997	(Australia) Wayne Gardner Racing	(Australia) Wayne Gardner	Holden VS Commodore		155	6th	6th
1998	(Australia) Glenn Seton Racing	(Australia) Glenn Seton	Ford EL Falcon	OC	145	4th	4th

=== Complete Bathurst/Eastern Creek 12 Hour results ===
Year	Team	Co-drivers	Car	Class	Laps	Pos.	Class pos.
1991		(Australia) Peter Brock (Australia) Peter McKay	Holden VN Commodore S	C	235	4th	**1st**
1992	Peugeot Concessionaires Australia	(Australia) Peter Brock (Australia) Paul Gover	Peugeot 405 Mi16	B	235	14th	**2nd**
1994	(Australia) BP Mazda Motorsport	(Australia) Gregg Hansford	Mazda RX-7	X	262	**1st**	**1st**
2007	Subaru Australia	(Australia) Chris Alajajian (Australia) Grant Denyer	Subaru Impreza WRX Sti Spec C	C	248	5th	**3rd**
2009	(Australia) Pro-Duct Motorsport	(Australia) Glenn Seton	Mitsubishi Lancer RS Evo X	C	222	17th	7th
2010	(Australia) Pro-Duct	(Australia) Glenn Seton (Australia) Mark King	Mitsubishi Lancer RS Evo X	A	201	**2nd**	**1st**

=== Complete Bathurst 24 Hour results ===
Year	Team	Co-drivers	Car	Class	Laps	Pos.	Class pos.
2003	(Australia) Prancing Horse Racing Scuderia	(Australia) John Bowe (Australia) Greg Crick (Indonesia) Maher Algadrie	BMW M3 GTR	A	131	DNF	DNF

Sporting positions
Preceded by Alan Jones; Garry Waldon	Winner of the Bathurst 12 Hour; 1994 (with Gregg Hansford)	Succeeded by Dick Johnson; John Bowe
