= Holden Commodore (VR) =

Australian full-size car

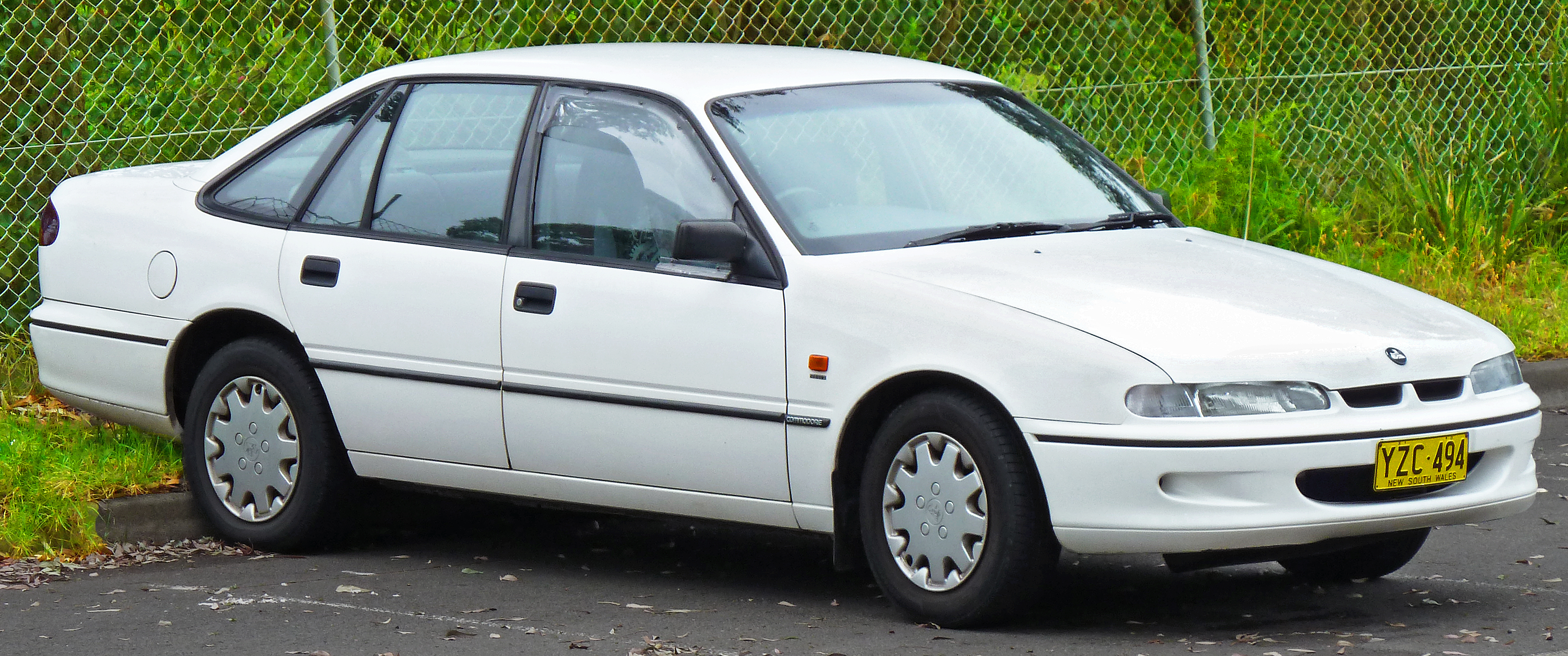
- 1995 Holden Commodore (VR II) Executive sedan

Overview
- Manufacturer: Holden (General Motors)
- Also called: Holden Calais; Holden Ute; Opel Calais; Toyota Lexcen (T3)
- Production: July 1993 – April 1995
- Assembly: Australia: Adelaide, South Australia (Elizabeth)
- Designer: John Field, Richard Ferlazzo

Body and chassis
- Class: Full-size
- Body style: 2-door coupe utility 4-door sedan 5-door station wagon
- Platform: FR layout GM V
- Related: Holden Statesman/Caprice (VR); HSV VR; CSV 220i Opel Omega A

Powertrain
- Engine: 2.6 L Dual Ram Inline 6 (Export Only); 3.8 L 3800 V6; 5.0 L HEC 5000i V8
- Transmission: 5-speed Borg-Warner T-5 manual 4-speed GM 4L60-E automatic

Chronology
- Predecessor: Holden Commodore (VP)
- Successor: Holden Commodore (VS)

The Holden Commodore (VR) is a full-size car which was produced by Holden from 1993 to 1995. It was the third iteration of the second generation of the Holden Commodore. The VR range included the luxury variants, Holden Commodore Berlina (VR) and Holden Calais (VR) and a commercial model, the Holden Ute (VR).

== Overview ==
Launched in July 1993 and sold until April 1995, the VR series came with an updated, sleeker and more modern design, as well as safety enhancements such as anti-lock brakes (ABS). It launched shortly before the Ford ED Falcon. From the side, the biggest change was the revised daylight opening around the C-pillar and the use of a round rear wheelarch, instead of a squared-off shape used on the previous VN and VP model Commodores. A Series II model launched in September 1994. The VR Acclaim and Calais included a driver's side Supplemental Restraint System (SRS) airbag as standard, which was a first for an Australian car. They also had standard ABS brakes and independent rear suspension (IRS). The airbag, ABS brakes and IRS were also available across the range for both automatic transmission and manual transmission models. The rear-end treatment saw raised tail lamps, which were recessed high up on the boot lid for safety reasons. A new electronic version of the Turbo-Hydramatic 700R4 (TH700) automatic transmission was introduced, known as the GM 4L60-E. The VR Commodore was Wheels Car of the Year for 1993.

== Models ==
=== Commodore Executive ===
Commodore Executive opened up the VR lineup, although it was primarily projected at fleet customers. Power steering, electric side mirrors and four-wheel disc brakes were standard, with automatic transmission optional.

Only one limited-edition model was offered in the VR range:

- Commodore Equipe: introduced in 1995, a Series II model in either sedan or wagon bodies was based on the Executive.

=== Commodore Acclaim ===
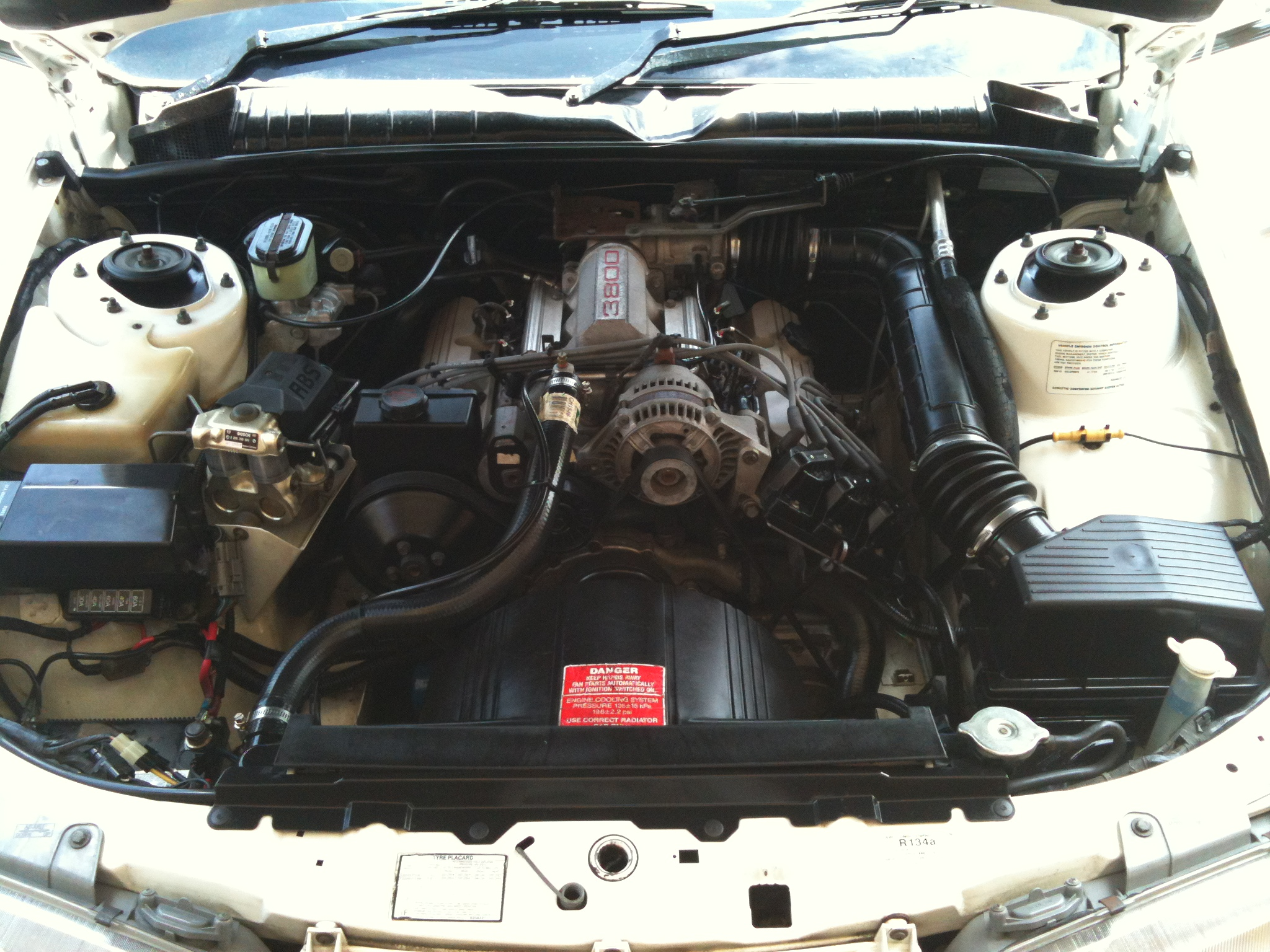
Holden VR Commodore Engine Bay with the 3.8 L 3800

With the introduction of the VR Commodore, Holden added the Acclaim model to the Commodore range. Sitting one notch above the Executive, the Acclaim was based on an automatic transmission Executive with a safety pack that was aimed at families and featured ABS brakes, IRS, driver's side airbag and cruise control as standard.

Although the Acclaim came standard with automatic transmission, a buyer could, by taking an Executive with manual transmission, and adding the ABS brakes, IRS, and airbag options, have a Commodore that was almost a manual transmission Acclaim. Only cruise control was not available as an option.

=== Commodore S ===
The Commodore S was a sports option based on the Executive, retaining its 3.8-litre engine.

=== Commodore SS ===
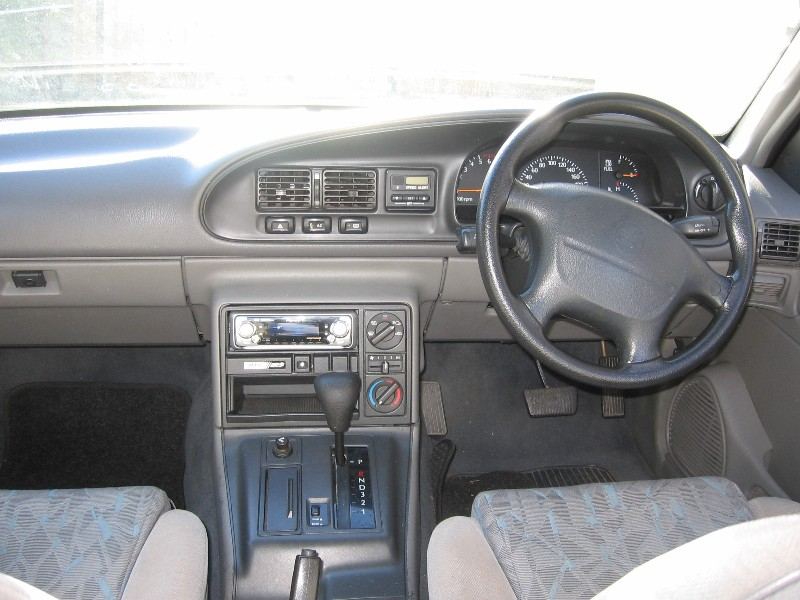
Interior of an SS

SS models were similar to the S, except that they were fitted with Holden's 5.0-litre HEC 5000i V8. A unique-to-SS alloy wheel design was also featured. A 185 kW (252 PS; 248 hp) engine was offered as an option.

=== Berlina ===
The Berlina was the first of the luxury-oriented variants. Alloy wheels, electric windows and automatic transmission were standard fitment. Sedan and wagon variants were offered.

=== Calais ===
The Calais topped the VR lineup with an automatic transmission, driver's airbag, IRS, and ABS as standard, as well as features, such as climate control and velour trim or optional leather, to differentiate it from the lesser Commodore models.

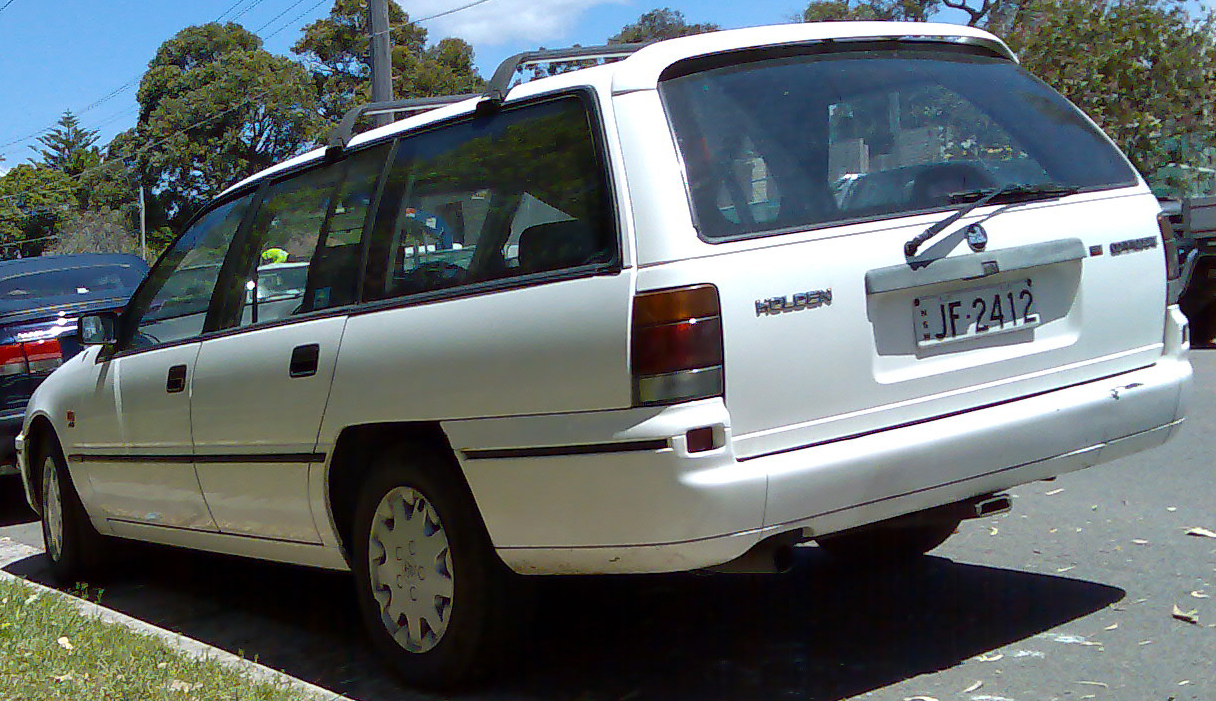
Commodore Executive wagon (Series II)

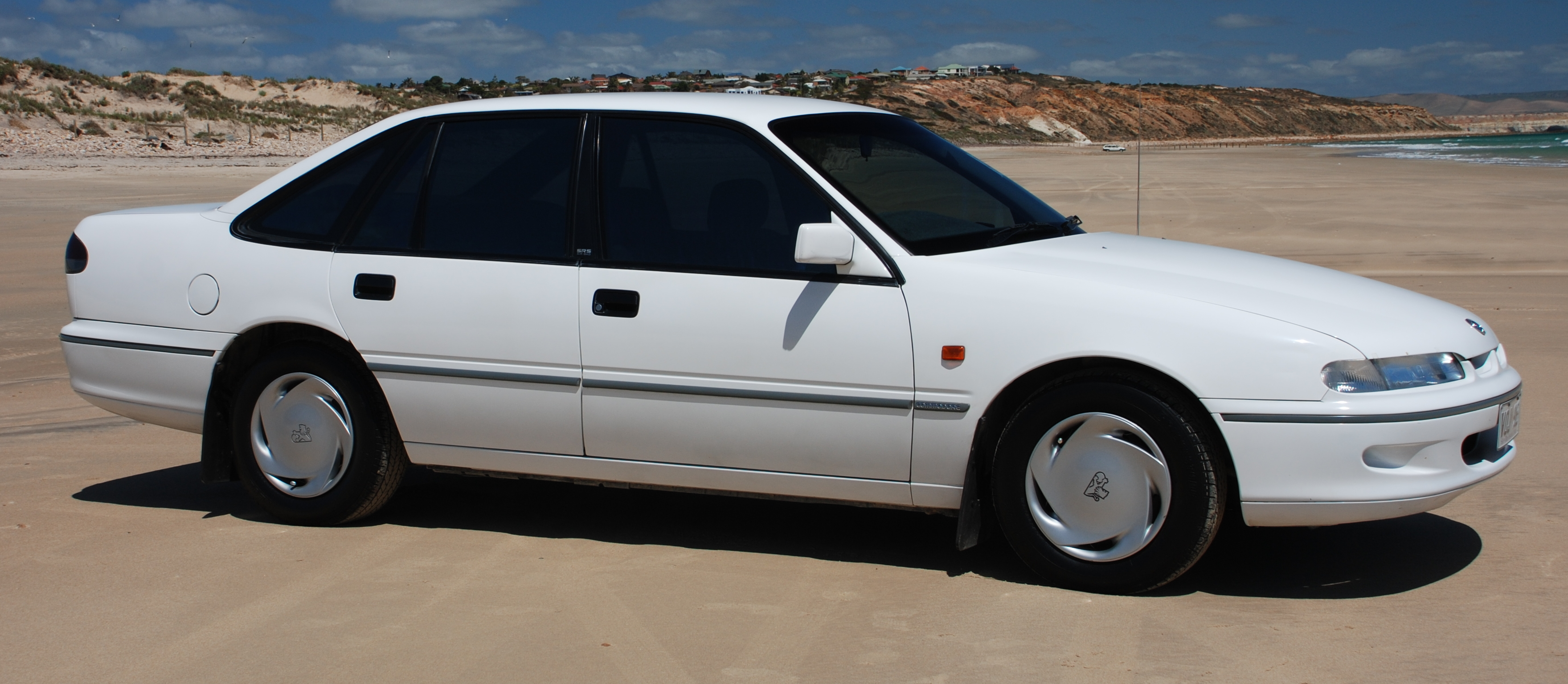
1994 Holden Commodore (VR) Acclaim sedan

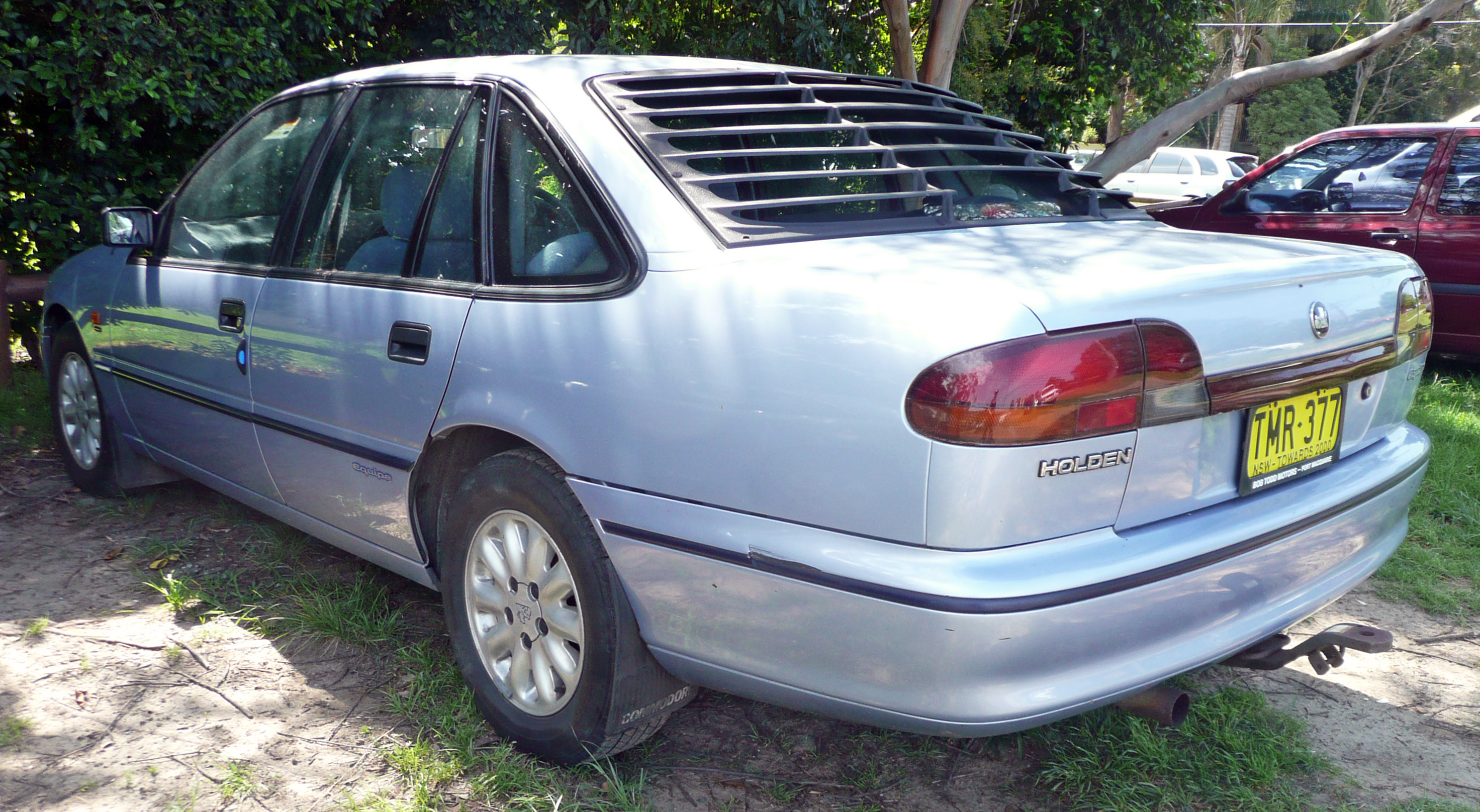
Commodore Equipe sedan (Series II, limited edition)

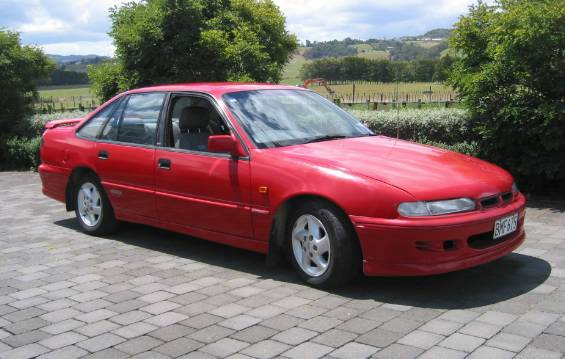
Commodore SS

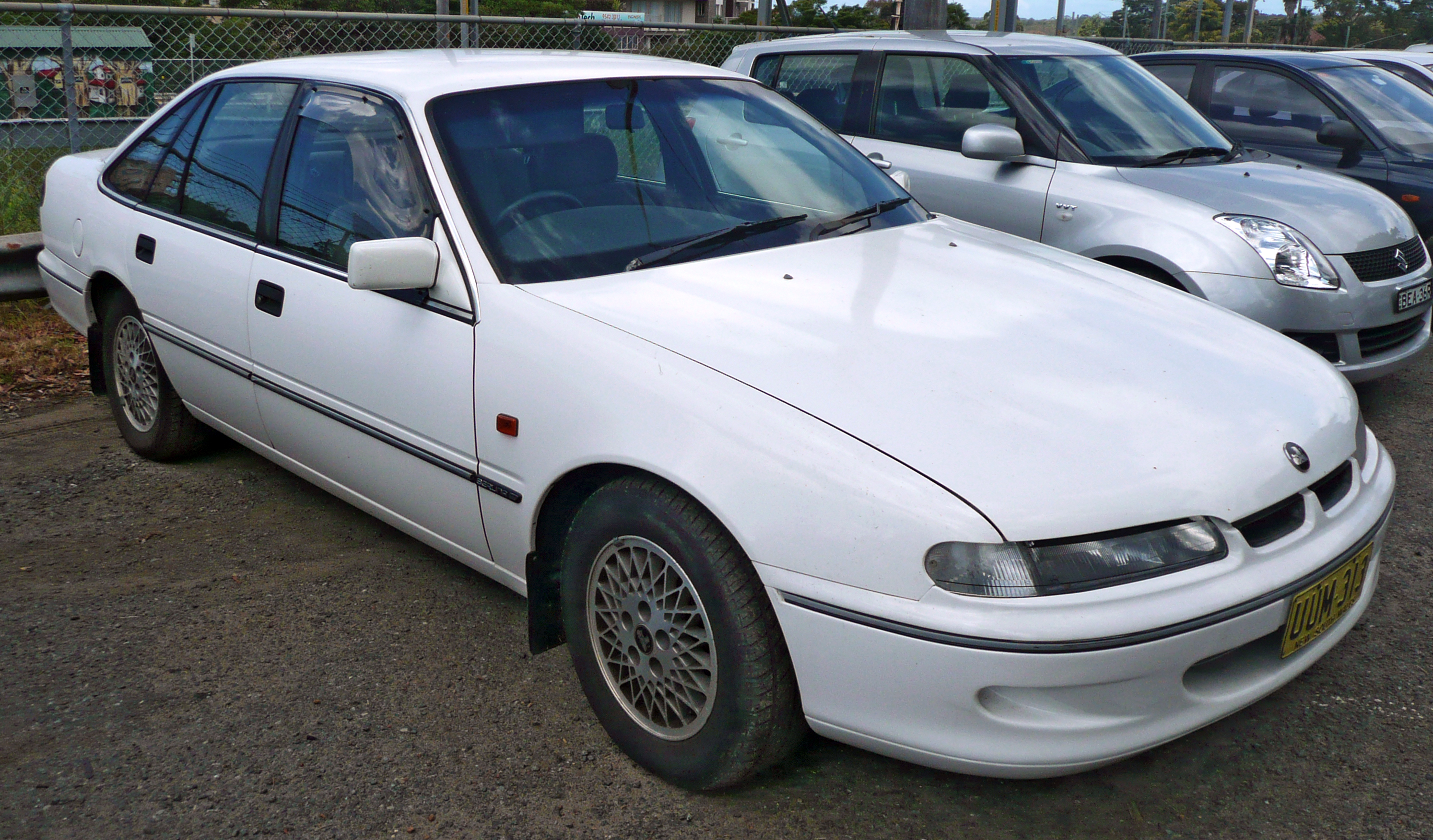
Holden Commodore Berlina sedan (VR)

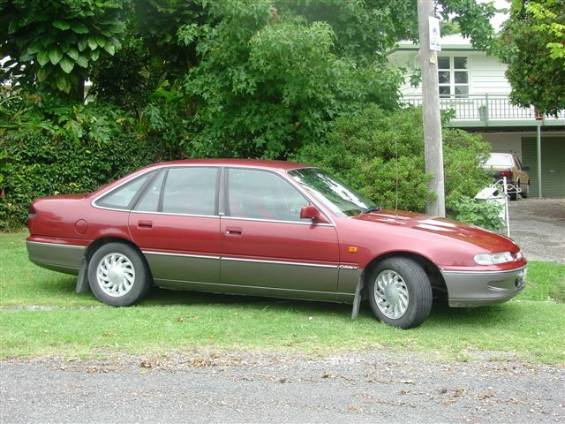
Holden Calais

== Holden Ute ==
A coupe utility variant of the VR Commodore was offered in Holden Ute and the Holden 'S’ Ute models. Unlike the Ute which carried no external model badging, the 'S’ Ute was fitted with "Commodore" badges.

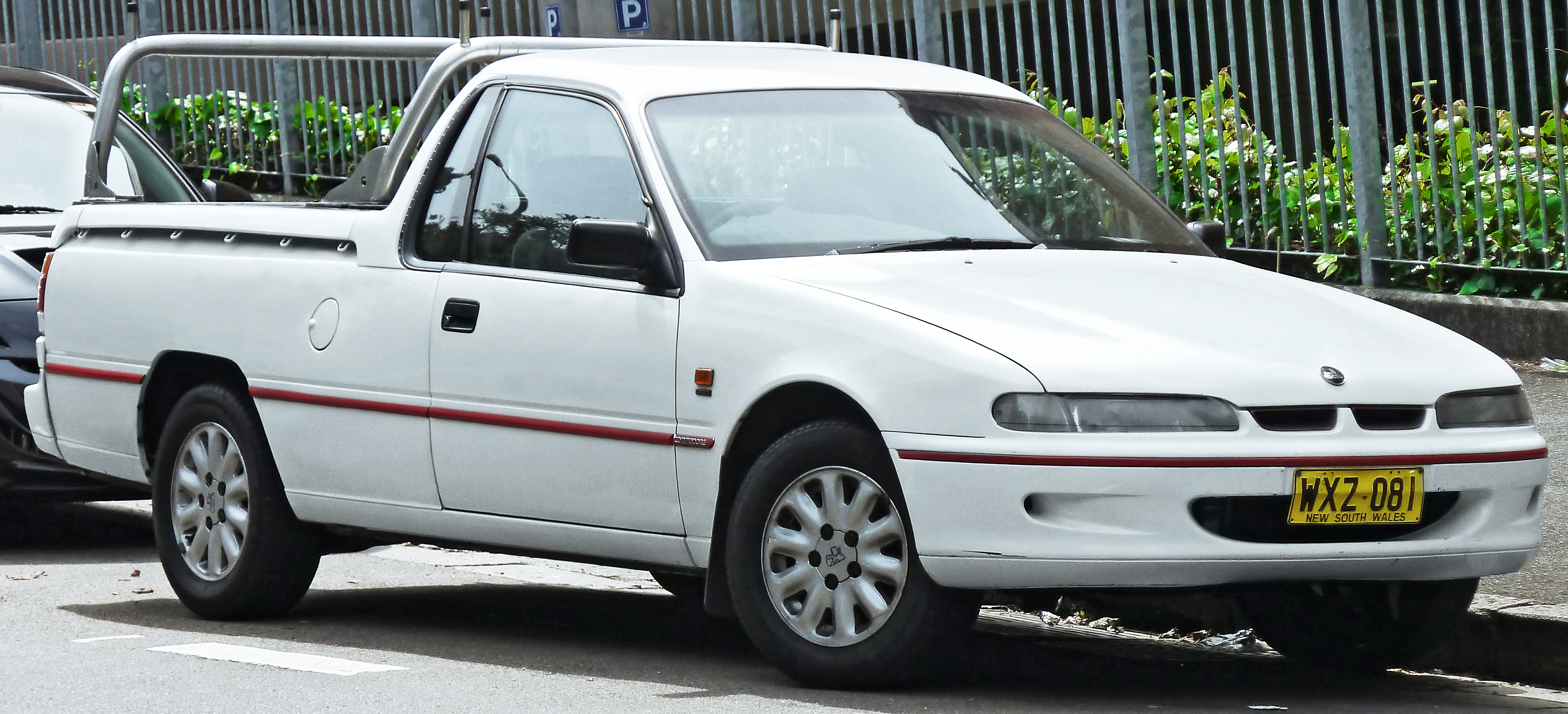
Holden Ute S (Series II)

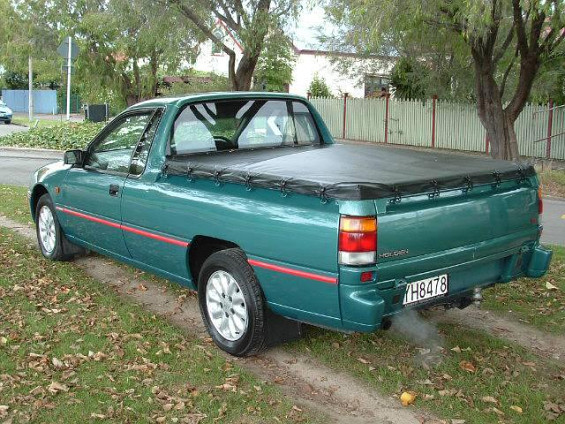
Holden Ute S

== Holden Statesman and Caprice (VR) ==
Holden also produced longer wheelbase variants of the Commodore VR as the Holden Statesman (VR) and the Holden Caprice (VR).

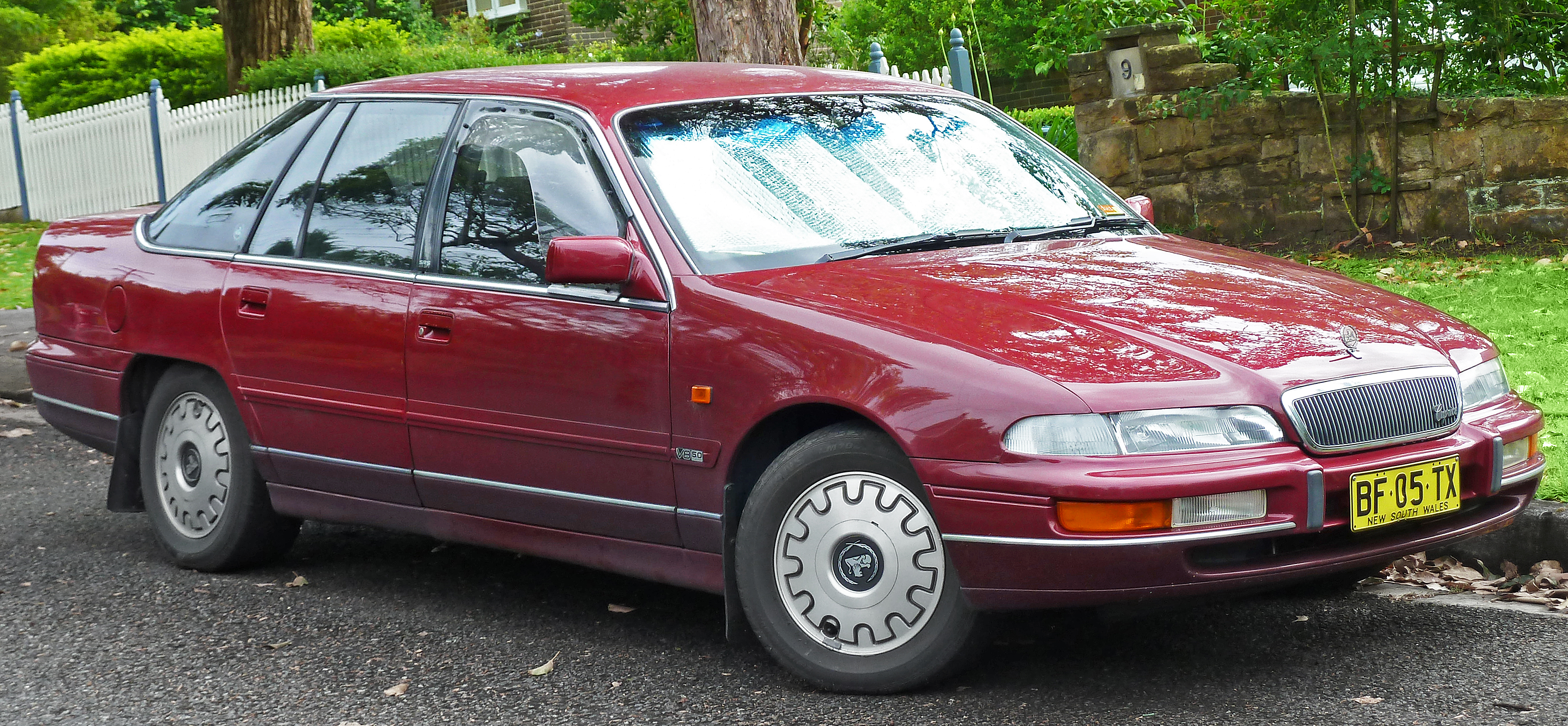
Holden Caprice (VR)

== HSV range ==
Holden's performance vehicle partner Holden Special Vehicles produced the following range of Holden VR based models, which were each marketed under the HSV brand.

=== Clubsport ===
The VR series Clubsport, which was based on the Holden Commodore (VR), was released in August 1993. It was powered by a 185 kW 5.0-litre V8 engine. 1,117 sedans and 77 wagons were produced.

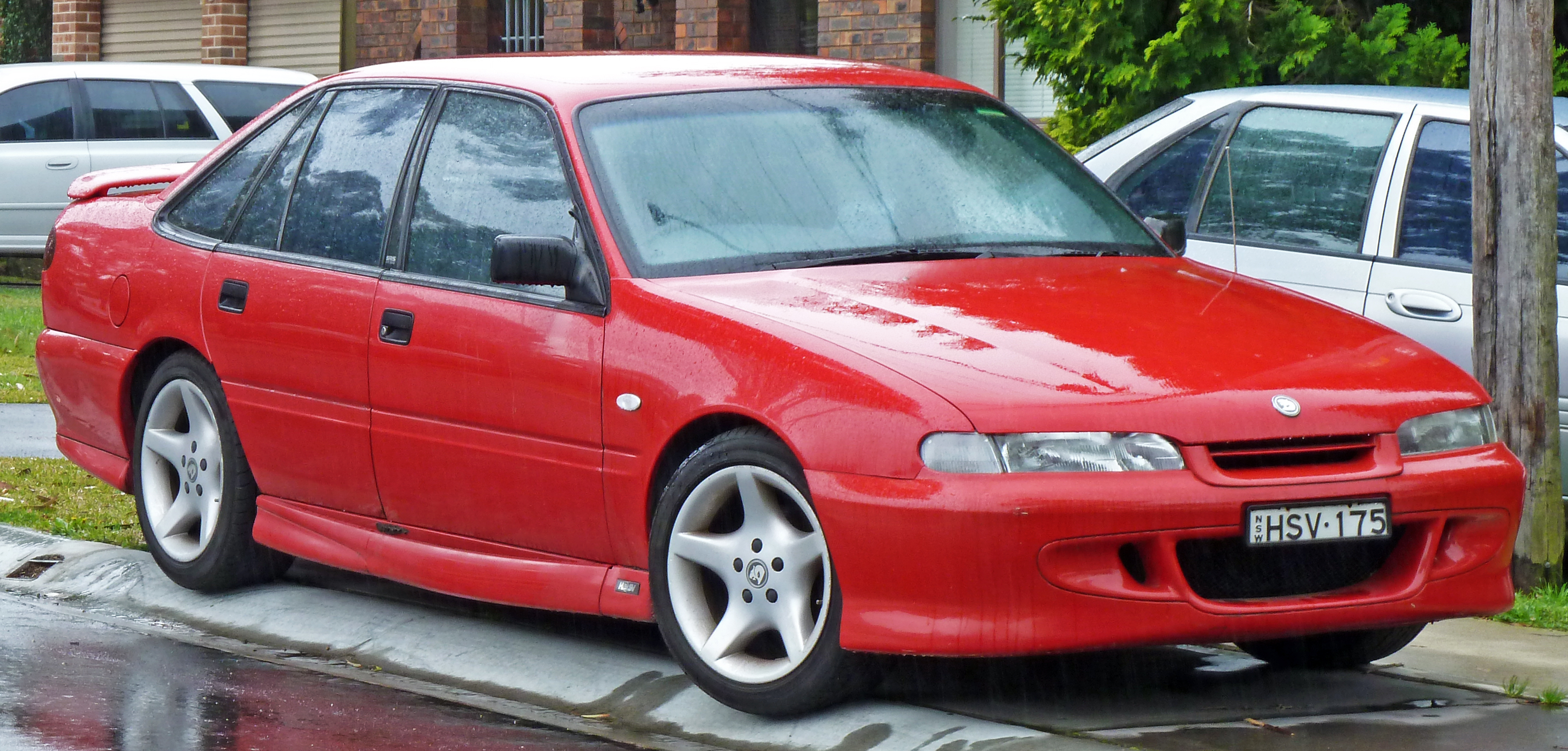
HSV Clubsport sedan

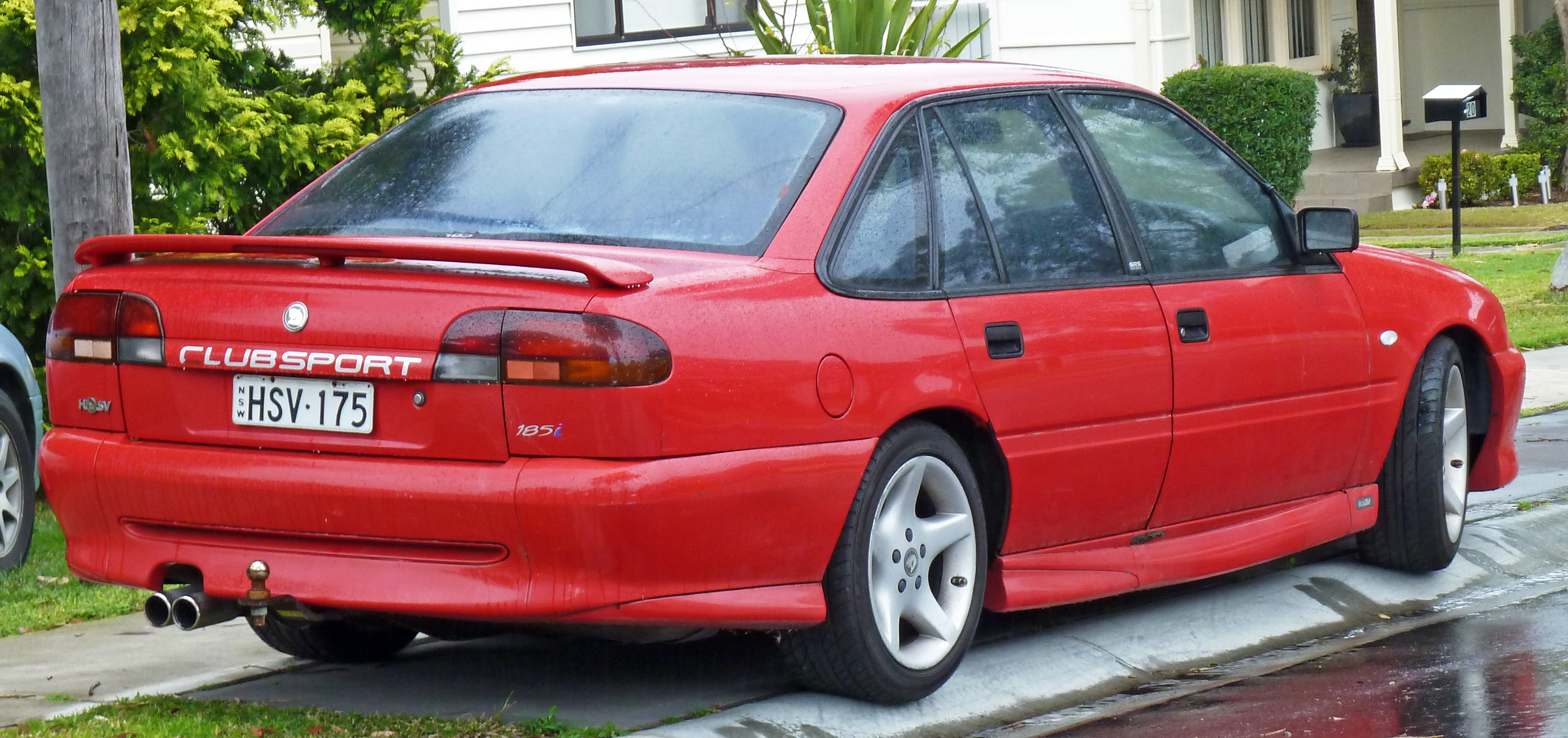
HSV Clubsport sedan

=== GTS ===
The GTS came with a six-speed manual or optional four-speed automatic. Its V8 engine was stroked from 5.0-litres to 5.7-litres from factory and produced 215 kW (288 hp) and 475 N⋅m (350 lb⋅ft). 277 were produced.

=== Maloo ===
The VR series Maloo utility was introduced in August 1993 with new front sheetmetal and a reworked interior appearance. The 5.0-litre V8 engine was upgraded slightly to 185 kW (248 hp). 156 examples were produced.

=== Senator ===
In 1993, the significantly redesigned VR Senator was released. The rear seating was from the Holden Statesman. Along with the rest of the HSV range, the Senator bodykit was penned by designer Ian Callum to produce a sleeker, more aggressive stance along with a 185 kW (248 hp) version of the 5.0-litre V8. A new suspension setup was developed, known as the touring package which aimed to provide capable handling and a smooth ride. Additionally from May 1994 onwards, the Senator could be optioned with HSV's new 215 kW (288 hp) 5.7-litre "stroker" V8 known as the "215i". The "stroker" engine option was handbuilt as an upgrade over the standard V8. This engine could be coupled to either the four-speed automatic transmission or a six-speed manual transmission. 0–100 km/h (0-60 mph) takes 7.8 sec for the 185i and takes 7.3 sec for the 215i. Total number built for both versions was 855.

== Toyota Lexcen (T3) ==
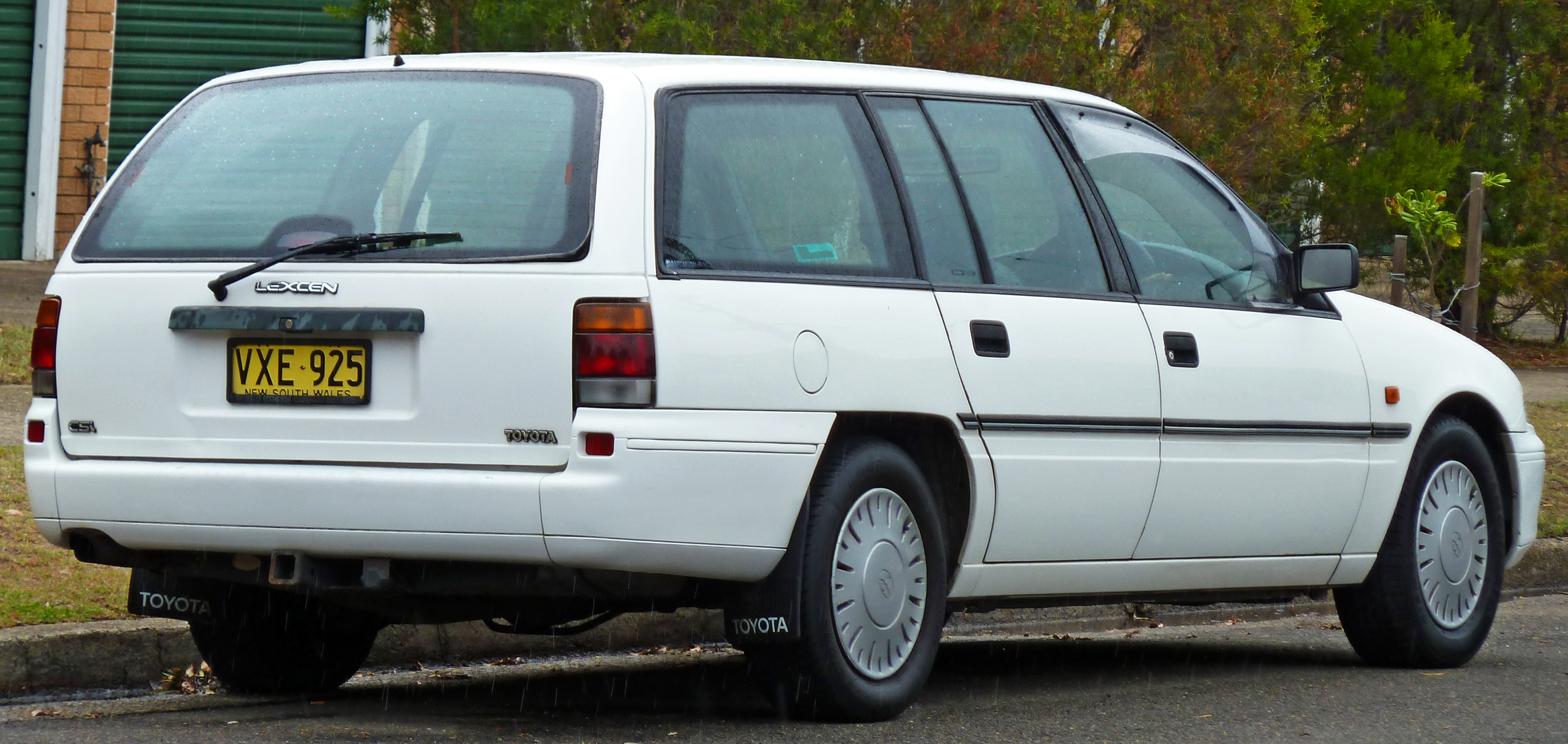
Toyota Lexcen (T3) CSi wagon

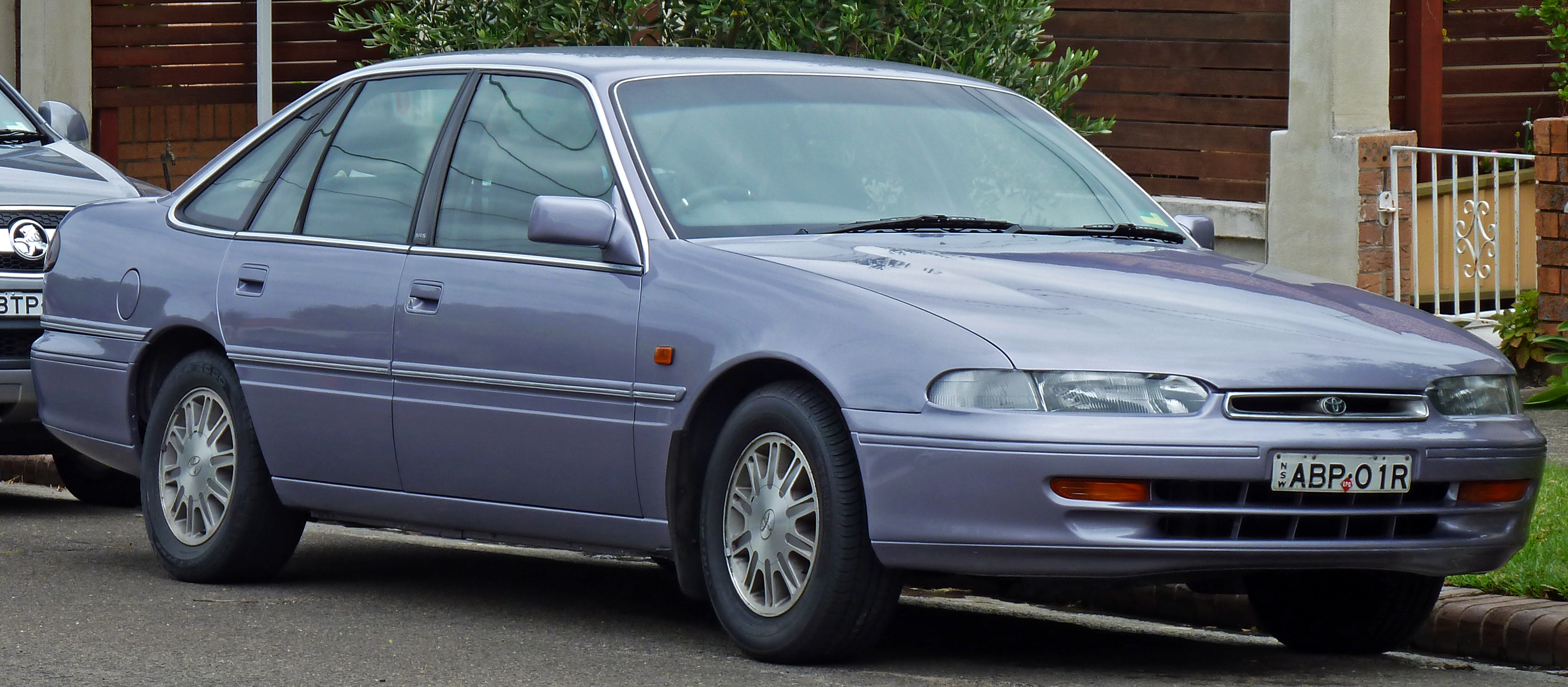
Toyota Lexcen (T3) Newport sedan

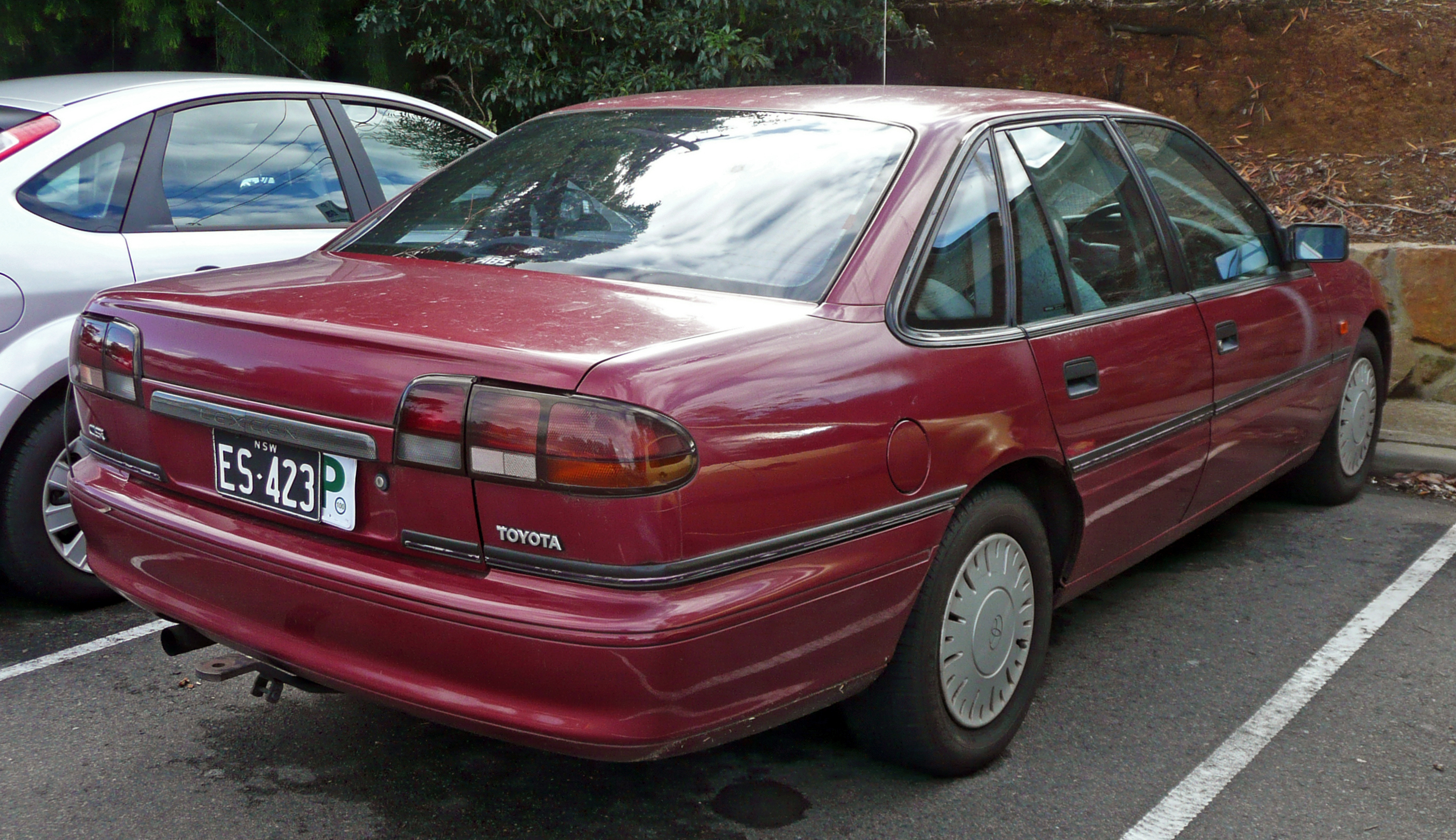
Toyota Lexcen (T3) CSi sedan

The United Australian Automobile Industries (UAAI) joint venture agreement with Toyota Australia first starting with the VN Commodore continued with the VP and VR. The VR Lexcen equivalent was known as the T3 series, and was introduced at or about the same time as the other VR models; featuring subtle styling differences, particularly, the front panels. While the VR badged as a Holden was either first or second in the monthly Australian automotive sales, the Toyota Lexcen sold substantially fewer, as there was an interpretation of the Toyota Lexcen as Japan returning to its copycat roots. This was due to Toyota specifying styling that was in common with the then new "wide body" Camry, while retaining the original Commodore bodywork and interiors. Lexcen sales were still quite low, also another factor in this is Holden restricted Toyota in the number of Lexcens it was to provide to them. The number of technical service bulletins, recalls and customer service exercises on Holden-supplied Lexcens exceeds typical Toyota exercises on Toyota built vehicles in the era by more than five to one.
