= Peter McLeod =

Australian racing driver

- Nationality: Australian
- Born: Peter Gerard McLeod; 6 May 1948 (age 78) Newcastle, New South Wales

Australian Touring Car Championship
- Years active: 1980–88
- Starts: 25
- Wins: 0
- Poles: 0
- Fastest laps: 0
- Best finish: 3rd in 1984 Australian Touring Car Championship

Previous series
- 1980–86 1980–87: Australian Endurance Championship; AMSCAR Series

Championship titles
- 1983 1987: Australian Endurance Championship; Bathurst 1000

Peter Gerard McLeod (born 6 May 1948 in Newcastle, New South Wales) is a retired Australian racing driver, best known as co-winner of the 1987 James Hardie 1000 at Bathurst, and for driving the distinctive yellow and black Slick 50 Mazda RX-7 Group C touring car during the early to mid-1980s.

== Group C Touring Cars ==
McLeod began his racing career in 1980 at the relatively old age of 32, progressing immediately into touring car racing where in just three seasons to become one of Australia's fastest privately entered touring car racers, and the fastest Mazda RX-7's behind Allan Moffat's factory supported team (though with reportedly more horsepower than Moffat's cars). By 1981, he had scored his first podium result with a third at the Oran Park 250 behind the Falcons of Dick Johnson and veteran Murray Carter.

McLeod's pace and consistency were rewarded when he won the 1983 Australian Endurance Championship, which didn't start well with 12th at both the Sydney rounds (Amaroo Park and Oran Park), followed by a DNF in the Castrol 400 at Sandown Raceway in Melbourne. It was his results in the final three rounds of the series which lifted him above the JPS Team BMW 635 CSi of Jim Richards. McLeod finished seventh in the James Hardie 1000 at Bathurst co-driving with Graeme Bailey, third at the Surfers Paradise 300, and finally sixth in the Humes Guardrail 300 at the Adelaide International Raceway (AIR) in November. Richards, who finished fifth and 15th at Amaroo and Oran Park and second at Sandown, scored no points at Bathurst and only finished seventh at Surfers, needed to finish at least two points in front of McLeod to win the title at Adelaide, but could only manage ninth in his BMW, giving the Wollongong based McLeod his first and only touring car championship in just his fourth season of driving.

Still driving the Slick 50 Mazda, McLeod finished third in the 1984 Australian Touring Car Championship behind the Holden Dealer Team Commodore of Peter Brock, and series winner Dick Johnson in his Greens-Tuf Ford Falcon. McLeod went into the final round at Adelaide in second position, 22 points in front of Brock, and needed to only finish 14th to claim second regardless of where Brock finished. Unfortunately, a clash with the BMW of Jim Richards on lap 4 at the end of AIR's 900-metre long front straight saw the Mazda with enough damage to have McLoeod limp back to the pits and retire, and with Brock finishing the race second behind Allan Grice and gaining 23 points, he moved to 95 points, one point in front of McLeod. 1984 was actually the only full ATCC that McLeod ever contested. His best finishes in the series were back to back second places in rounds 4 and 5 at Surfers Paradise behind Johnson and Oran Park behind the RX-7 of 1979 ATCC champion Bob Morris. These would also prove to be the highest placings McLeod achieved in 25 ATCC rounds competed in between 1981 and 1988.

Following the ATCC, McLeod was unable to repeat his 1983 Endurance Championship win and finished the 1984 Championship in ninth place. After finishing third in the opening round, the Silastic 300 at Amaroo Park, behind the Nissan Bluebird Turbo of Garry Scott, he finished seventh in the Valvoline 250 at Oran Park, but it went downhill from there. McLeod and Graeme Bailey failed to finish at Sandown and Bathurst, while Mcleod didn't compete at the Surfers Paradise 300 bringing an end to the Group C era in Australia.

There were two more Group C races held before the end of 1994. One was the support race for the Australian Grand Prix at the Calder Park Raceway in Melbourne. After qualifying eighth at Calder, the RX-7 didn't get off the line and was a first lap DNF. McLeod didn't take the car to the final ever competitive Group C race at Baskerville Raceway in Tasmania.

== 1985 Daytona 24 Hour ==
In 1985, McLeod joined Allan Moffat, Kevin Bartlett and Gregg Hansford in Mazda Australia's attack on the 24 Hours of Daytona. Driving Moffat's Bathurst RX-7, but with a different rear wing and without the CAMS imposed 20 kg (44 lb) lead ballast, the car qualified in the 38th (11th in the GTO class) and ran strongly until mechanical failure near the end of the race. They were eventually classified 24th, 221 laps behind the winning Porsche 962 driven by A. J. Foyt, Bob Wollek, Al Unser and Thierry Boutsen. McLeod, Moffat and Hansford, all of whom had been regular drivers of the RX-7's in Australia, all expressed delight with how much quicker the car was without its added weight, stating that without that extra weight, the rotary powered cars would have proved more of a threat to the V8's at Bathurst.

== 1985 Australian GT Championship ==
McLeod continued to race his Mazda RX-7 in the 1985 Australian GT Championship. He placed fifth in the championship, his best finish being third at the Adelaide round. The 13B engined Mazda was still in the same CAMS production based Group C trim in which it finished 1984 and was outperformed by purpose-built GT cars such as Bryan Thompson's 4.2L Chevrolet powered, twin turbocharged Mercedes-Benz 450 SLC and his newly acquired 6.0L Chevrolet Monza (in which Allan Grice had easily won the 1984 Australian GT Championship), and Kevin Bartlett's ground effects De Tomaso Pantera. Thompson would win the title driving both the Mercedes-Benz and the Chevrolet.

== Group A Touring Cars ==
The change to Group A Touring Car regulations for the 1985 Australian Touring Car Championship forced McLeod, and others such as Allan Moffat, to abandon the RX-7 as the cars would have to revert to running the standard 12A motor, would have no aerodynamic aids and would generally be uncompetitive. Like many privateers, McLeod opted to drive a Holden VK Commodore for the 1985 season, but like most Commodore teams, including the factory-backed Holden Dealer Team, the 1985 Group A Commodore wasn't as competitive as hoped. Compared to 1984, the cars had no aerodynamic aids, was some 120 kg heavier, and had lost approximately 110 bhp (82 kW; 112 PS) in 1985. McLeod's car, built from an ex road car, came into its own in the 1985 James Hardie 1000 at Bathurst, and for much of the race McLeod and co-driver Bailey had the car running in the top 10, and indeed held 5th place for a time and was the second Commodore on the road behind Peter Brock's lead HDT car. Their good run came to an end when the gearbox broke on lap 126.

Like all Commodore runners, McLeod upgraded to the newly homologated Holden VK Commodore SS Group A for 1986. He competed in only two rounds of the 1986 ATCC at Sandown and Oran Park, and finished 19th in the championship. He did not have a good Endurance Championship. He failed to finish the Castrol 500 at Sandown and after qualifying 15th at Bathurst, McLeod crashed the Commodore heavily at the 160 km/h right hand McPhillamy Park on lap 48 of the race. McLeod later reported that the car blew its right front tyre and, unable to steer the car, he drove over the ripple strip on the outside of the track and flew clear over the sand trap and into the tyre wall, destroying the front right of the car in the process. The car's roll cars withstood the accident and Mcleod was able to walk away from the incident unhurt although he was a little shaken. Bathurst 1986 was where McLeod's friend Mike Burgmann lost his life in a 260 km/h crash at the base of the bridge near the end of the 1.9 km long Conrod straight. The consequence of Burgmann's crash saw the inclusion of Caltex Chase to the circuit in 1987 in a bid to slow the cars down. McLeod's former co-driver Graeme Bailey won the 1986 James Hardie with Allan Grice in a Holden Commodore.

McLeod continued to run his VK Commodore during 1987 including the Castrol 500 at Sandown co-driving with Peter Fitzgerald (DNF after only 17 laps with a failed clutch). Following the Sandown race, McLeod was drafted into the by then no longer factory-backed Holden Dealer Team, running under the name Brock HDT P/L after Brock's well publicised split with Holden earlier in the year, to drive the team's second car at the 1987 James Hardie 1000 which had become a round of the 1987 World Touring Car Championship. McLeod joined formula 2 racer John Crooke in car #10 (Brock's 1986 car upgraded to VL Group A specs). Despite setting the qualifying time for his usual #05 car, Brock also set the time for car #10. Despite it being against the rules for a driver to qualify two cars (i.e. Brock's time for car #10 should not have counted towards the cars grid position as he had also set fastest time in 05, his nominated #1 car), somehow Brock's time stood and was good enough to put the car in 20th place (McLeod's time was good enough for 27th on the grid). McLeod completed the first two stints of the race totaling 61 laps, lifting the car to 5th place. Teammates Peter Brock and David Parsons then took over the car after their 05 went out with engine failure on lap 34. Inspired driving by Brock and Parsons in a rain-plagued second half combined with good strategy and a lucky break with safety car procedures placed them into third position behind the two Eggenberger Motorsport Ford Sierra RS500s at the end of the race. The car was only thrown together with old parts lying around the HDT workshop and wasn't expected to last very long (something McLeod didn't know at the time) so for it finish third while the teams lead car expired early was a surprise to the team.

Before the race, a formal protest had been lodged against the Eggenberger Motorsport Sierras for illegal bodywork relating to the size of their front wheel arches. As no road-legal Sierra existed in Australia at the time, the protest was delayed by a few months and it wasn't until January 1988 that McLeod, Brock and Parsons were declared the winners of the 1987 James Hardie 1000.

Like other privateer Commodore runners, McLeod saw little value in driving in the 1988 Australian Touring Car Championship against the improving Ford Sierras, though he did run in the first five rounds of the nine-race series. Following the ATCC, McLeod built a new 'Walkinshaw' spec VL Commodore Group A SV with the engine and suspension supplied by the Peter Brock organisation, who by that stage were running the BMW M3's. The car debuted at the Enzed 500 at Sandown complete with sponsorship from Yellow Pages, the car's yellow and black paint scheme looking very similar to the Slick 50 Mazda of McLeod's Group C days. Clutch failure ended Mcleod and co-driver Jim Keogh's race after just 21 laps at Sandown after qualifying 15th. The Tooheys 1000 at Bathurst wasn't much better for the team. The car had three separate crashes in practice and qualifying and then blew its engine in the morning warm-up. The crew had just under 90 minutes to replace the engine and get the car into pit lane to make the start. This they accomplished just as the field was coming around for the rolling start (used for the first and only time in the race's history) and after taking two laps to get the car started, it lasted only seven laps before the replacement engine failed. Before the first engine failure, McLeod had reported that the car felt better in the morning warm up session, and had reportedly set a faster time than he had during qualifying.

Following the Tooheys 1000, McLeod bowed out of touring car racing. Like many other privateers, he claimed it was too expensive to run a competitive Group A touring car.

== Bathurst 12 Hour ==
With the advent of the 12-hour Production Car Race at Bathurst, McLeod took to the Mountain again in a Citroën BX 16V in 1991 finishing second in class B, returning the following year with a three-car factory team to win the class, this time beating the Brock-prepared and driven Peugeot 405s. Further 12-hr attempts followed in the BX 16V's and later in a Mazda RX-7 Twin Turbo with moderate success.

== V8 Supercars ==
McLeod faded out of the scene over the next few racing seasons but returned to the sport in 1994 as McLeod's son Ryan started to make his way into V8 Supercar racing. McLeod co-drove with Ryan McLeod in endurance races from 1994–96 in the Family run ENZED sponsored Commodore before retiring completely. McLeod has stayed involved in the sport and recently has acted as driver of V8 Supercar's safety car.

== Semi-Retirement ==
McLeod has since turned his attention to his passion for Citroëns, importing and fully restoring the rare and highly prized Maserati-engined Citroën SMs from the early 70s. His work is highly regarded on an international scale and the cars are in demand by classic car enthusiasts worldwide. Over 30 such examples have now been completed. A return to Bathurst as a competitor occurred for the 2009 WPS Bathurst 12 Hour driving a Holden Astra SRi Turbo, co-driving with his two sons, Ryan and Gerard. The family run car finished 21st in 2009 before returning in 2010 to win Class D and finish tenth outright. As of 2015, McLeod was competing in the Kerrick Sports Sedan Series in a turbocharged Mazda RX-7 Series 1 which made its debut in 2012.

== Career results ==
Season	Series	Position	Car	Team
1980	Australian Touring Car Championship	24th	Mazda RX-7	McLeod Mazda
1981	Australian Touring Car Championship	17th	Mazda RX-7	McLeod Mazda
1981	Better Brakes 3.5 Litre Series	9th	Mazda RX-7	McLeod Mazda
1982	Australian Touring Car Championship	15th	Mazda RX-7	Strongbow Cider
1982	Australian Endurance Championship	37th	Mazda RX-7	Strongbow Cider
1983	Better Brakes AMSCAR Series	6th	Mazda RX-7	Petrolon Slick 50 Racing
1983	Australian Endurance Championship	**1st**	Mazda RX-7	Petrolon Slick 50 Racing
1984	Australian Touring Car Championship	**3rd**	Mazda RX-7	Petrolon Slick 50
1984	Australian Endurance Championship	9th	Mazda RX-7	Petrolon Slick 50
1985	Australian GT Championship	5th	Mazda RX-7	Petrolon Slick 50
1986	Australian Touring Car Championship	19th	Holden VK Commodore SS Group A	Autopart Centre
1986	Australian Endurance Championship	56th	Holden VK Commodore SS Group A	Autopart Centre
1988	Australian Touring Car Championship	17th	Holden VL Commodore SS Group A	Peter McLeod
2015	Kerrick Sports Sedan Series	20th	Mazda RX-7	Slick 50

=== Complete Australian Touring Car Championship results ===
(key) (Races in bold indicate pole position) (Races in italics indicate fastest lap)

Year	Team	Car	1	2	3	4	5	6	7	8	9	10	DC	Points
1980	McLeod Mazda	Mazda RX-7	SYM	CAL	LAK	SAN	WAN	SUR; Ret	AIR; 5	ORA; 6			24th	3
1981	McLeod Mazda	Mazda RX-7	SYM	CAL	ORA	SAN	WAN; 4	AIR; 6	LAK	SUR			17th	5
1982	Strongbow Cider	Mazda RX-7	SAN; 12	CAL; Ret	SYM; 7	ORA; Ret	LAK	WAN; 5	AIR; Ret	SUR			15th	12
1984	Petrolon Slick 50 Racing	Mazda RX-7	SAN; Ret	SYM; 4	WAN; 4	SUR; 2	ORA; 2	LAK; 5	AIR; Ret				3rd	95
1986	Autopart Centre	Holden VK Commodore SS Group A	AMA	SYM	SAN; 5	AIR	WAN	SUR	CAL	LAK	WIN	ORA; 9	19th	25
1988	Peter McLeod	Holden VK Commodore SS Group A Holden VL Commodore SS Group A	CAL; 9	SYM; Ret	WIN; Ret	WAN; 8	AIR; 15	LAK	SAN	AMA	ORA		17th	5

=== Complete World Touring Car Championship results ===
(key) (Races in bold indicate pole position) (Races in italics indicate fastest lap)

Year	Team	Car	1	2	3	4	5	6	7	8	9	10	11	DC	Points
1987	(Australia) HDT Racing P/L	Holden VL Commodore SS Group A	MNZ	JAR	DIJ	NUR	SPA	BNO	SIL	BAT; 1	CLD ovr:11 cls:7	WEL	FJI	NC	0

* Despite winning the James Hardie 1000 at Bathurst, McLeod scored no World Championship points as he wasn't a registered WTCC competitor.

=== Complete Bathurst 1000 results ===
Year	Team	Co-drivers	Car	Class	Laps	Pos.	Class pos.
1980	(Australia) McLeod Mazda	(Australia) Mal Brewster	Mazda RX-7	2001-3000cc	65	DNF	DNF
1981	(Australia) Peter McLeod	(Australia) Peter Dane	Mazda RX-7	6 Cylinder & Rotary	96	26th	7th
1982	(Australia) Strongbow Racing Team	(Australia) Peter Dane	Mazda RX-7	A	153	9th	8th
1983	(Australia) Petrolon Slick 50	(Australia) Graeme Bailey	Mazda RX-7	A	157	5th	5th
1984	(Australia) Petrolon Slick 50	(Australia) Graeme Bailey	Mazda RX-7	Group C	39	DNF	DNF
1985	(Australia) I.M.B. Team Wollongong	(Australia) Graeme Bailey	Holden VK Commodore	C	126	DNF	DNF
1986	(Australia) Autopart Centre	(New Zealand) Glenn Clark	Holden VK Commodore SS Group A	C	48	DNF	DNF
1987	(Australia) HDT Racing P/L	(Australia) Peter Brock (Australia) David Parsons (Australia) Jon Crooke	Holden VL Commodore SS Group A	1	158	**1st**	**1st**
1988	(Australia) Yellow Pages	(Australia) Jim Keogh	Holden VL Commodore SS Group A SV	A	7	DNF	DNF
1994	(Australia) Peter McLeod	(Australia) Ryan McLeod (Australia) Kevin Burton	Holden VL Commodore SS Group A SV	A	83	DNF	DNF
1995	(Australia) Enzed Racing	(Australia) Ryan McLeod	Holden VR Commodore		0	DNF	DNF
1996	(Australia) Enzed Racing	(Australia) Ryan McLeod	Holden VR Commodore		85	DNF	DNF

=== Complete Bathurst/Eastern Creek 12 Hour results ===
Year	Team	Co-drivers	Car	Class	Laps	Pos.	Class pos.
1991	(Australia) Peter McLeod	(New Zealand) Glenn Clark (Australia) Barry Jones	Citroën BX16	B	NA	NA	**2nd**
1992	(Australia) Peter McLeod	(Australia) Peter Dane (New Zealand) Peter Janson	Citroën BX16	B	238	8th	**1st**
1993	(Australia) Peter McLeod	(Australia) Peter Dane (New Zealand) Peter Janson	Citroën BX16	B	191	DNF	DNF
1994	(Australia) Peter McLeod	(Australia) Peter Dane (Australia) Des Wall	Mazda RX-7	X	225	26th	5th
1995	(Australia) Peter McLeod	(Australia) Ryan McLeod	Mazda RX-7	X	137	DNF	DNF
2009	(Australia) Racer Industries	(Australia) Ryan McLeod (Australia) Gerard McLeod	Holden Astra SRi	F	216	21st	**3rd**
2010	(Australia) Racer Industries	(Australia) Ryan McLeod (Australia) Gerard McLeod	Holden Astra SRi Turbo	D	192	11th	**1st**

=== Complete 24 Hours of Daytona results ===
Year	Team	Co-drivers	Car	Class	Laps	Pos.	Class pos.
1985	(Australia) Allan Moffat Racing	(Canada) Allan Moffat (Australia) Gregg Hansford (Australia) Kevin Bartlett	Mazda RX-7	GTO	482	24th	7th

Sporting positions
Preceded by Allan Grice; Graeme Bailey	Winner of the Bathurst 1000; 1987 (with Peter Brock & David Parsons)	Succeeded by Tony Longhurst; Tomas Mezera
