= 1991 Bathurst 12 Hour =

Endurance racing event

1991 James Hardie 12 Hour

Seasons
- ← none 1992 →

Layout of the Mount Panorama Circuit

The 1991 James Hardie 12 Hour was an endurance race for production cars staged at the Mount Panorama Circuit, Bathurst, New South Wales, Australia, on 31 March 1991. It was the first "Bathurst 12 Hour". Of the 24 starters, 20 were classified as finishers.

The race was won by Allan Grice, Peter Fitzgerald and Nigel Arkell driving a Toyota Supra.

== Classes ==
The race was open to "Group E" cars (officially Group 3E Series Production Cars) and other production cars.

Cars competed in the following classes:

- Class A : Touring cars under 1600 cc
- Class B : Touring cars 1601 - 2500 cc
- Class C : Touring cars 2501 - 4000 cc
- Class D : Touring cars over 4000 cc
- Class S : Sports cars under 2200 cc
- Class T : Turbocharged cars

== Results ==
Pos.	Drivers	No.	Car	Entrant	Class	Class pos.	Laps
1	Allan Grice; Peter Fitzgerald; Nigel Arkell	2	Toyota Supra Turbo	Fitzgerald Racing	T	1	242
2	Kent Youlden; Ken Douglas; Brett Youlden	7	Ford Laser KF TX3 4WD Turbo	Ford Motor Company	T	2	239
3	Warren Cullen; Glenn Cullen; Gary Cooke	19	Holden VN Commodore SS	Warren Cullen	D	1	236
4	Peter Brock; Neil Crompton; Peter McKay	05	Holden VN Commodore S	Neil Crompton	C	1	235
5	John Bourke; Bryan Thomson	15	Toyota Supra Turbo		T	3	234
6	Colin Bond; John Smith; Bruce Stewart	8	Toyota MR2	Caltex CXT Racing	S	1	233
7	Garry Rogers; Paul Fordham	10	Nissan 300ZX	Garry Rogers Motorsport	C	2	232
8	Tony Nicholson; Gary McDonald; Roland Hill	9	Holden VN Commodore SS	Positive Performance	D	2	227
9	George Fury; Rod Jones; Alf Grant	4	Mitsubishi Galant VR4		T	4	227
10	Geoff Forshaw; Mark Brame; Henry Draper	27	Suzuki Swift GTi		A	1	226
11	Tony Farrell; Andrew Newton	3	Honda CRX		S	2	224
12	Ray Vincent; Todd Wanless; Rod Dawson	17	Ford Falcon EA		C	3	223
13	Peter Whitaker; Calcin Gardner; Geoff Full	29	Suzuki Swift GTi		A	2	222
14	Robin Bennett; David Borg; Andrew Solness	18	Toyota Corolla		A	3	222
15	Richard Vorst; Kevin Burton; Peter Johnston	28	Suzuki Swift GTi		A	4	217
16	Phil Alexander; Keith McCulloch; Warren Rush	35	Suzuki Swift GTi		A	5	216
17	Neal Bates; Rick Bates; Geoff Morgan	12	Toyota Celica		B	1	215
18	David Ratciff; Garry Wilmington; Tom Watkinson	11	Toyota Corolla		A	6	214
19	Damon Beck; Colin Osborne; Aaron McGill	32	Suzuki Swift GTi		A	7	192
20	Peter McLeod; Glenn Clark; Barry Jones	16	Citroën BX 16v		B	2	191
DNF	John Giddings; Wayne Park; Graham Nelson	22	Holden VN Commodore SS		D	-	165
DNF	Tony Kavich; Bob Griffin; Trevor Hodge	23	Holden Commodore VN		C	-	150
DNF	Max Bonney; Malcolm Stenniken; David James	26	Holden VN Commodore S		C	-	149
DNF	Paul Flottman; Mal Rose	44	Holden VN Commodore S		C	-	67

- Fastest lap: Peter Fitzgerald (Toyota Supra Turbo), 2:42.83 (137.36 km/h) on lap 225.
