= Neal Bates =

Australian rally and racing driver (born 1965)

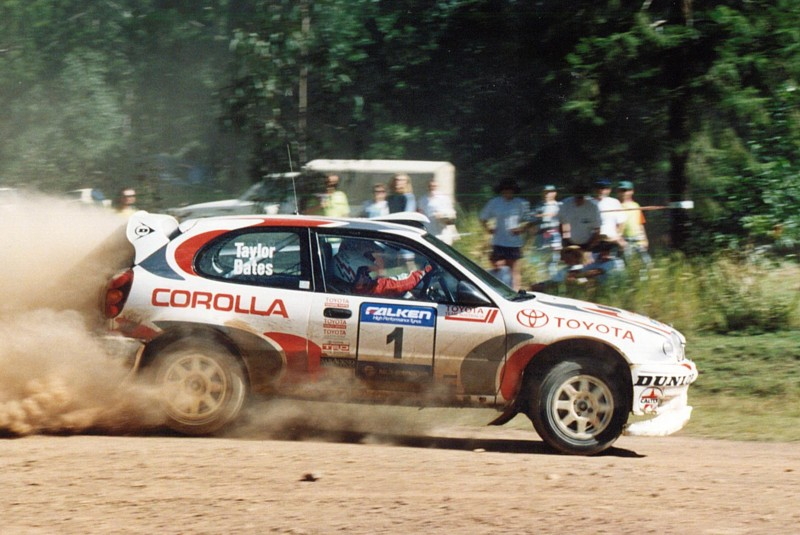
- Neal Bates and Coral Taylor
- Nationality: (Australia) Australian
- Born: Neal Anthony Bates; 19 March 1965 (age 61) Canberra, Australian Capital Territory, Australia
- Relatives: Rick Bates (twin brother); Alison Drower (sister-in-law); Zach Bates (nephew); Harry Bates (son)

Australian Rally Championship
- Years active: 1989–2009
- Teams: Neal Bates Motorsport
- Best finish: 1st in 1993, 1994, 1995 & 2008

Previous series
- 1997–2003 1997 1997 1993–97 1989–93 1989: V8 Supercars; Australian Super Touring Championship; Australian GT Production Car Championship; World Rally Championship; Australian Endurance Championship; Australian Touring Car Championship

Championship titles
- 2008 1995 1995 1994 1993: Australian Rally Championship; Targa Tasmania; Australian Rally Championship; Australian Rally Championship; Australian Rally Championship

Awards
- 2013: Peter Brock Medal

Neal Anthony Bates (born 19 March 1965) is an Australian rally and racing car driver. Throughout his career Bates has been associated with Toyota in the Australian Rally Championship and for 19 years his Neal Bates Motorsport outfit ran Toyota's official rally program in Australia. Bates claimed four drivers' titles in this time and helped Toyota win four manufacturers' crowns.

Bates' navigator/co-driver since 1993 has been Coral Taylor.

Bates long-time partnership with Toyota also brought the first of many circuit racing opportunities, a drive in a star search program in Toyota's Australian Touring Car Championship team. This led to a number of touring car racing opportunities with the factory Toyota Corolla teams as well as V8 Supercar teams including Paul Weel Racing, Glenn Seton Racing and Gibson Motorsport.

== Career results ==
Season	Series	Position	Car	Team
1991	World Rally Championship	56th	Toyota Celica GT-Four	Toyota Team Europe
1991	Australian Rally Championship	2nd	Toyota Celica GT-Four	Neal Bates Motorsport
1992	Australian Rally Championship	4th	Toyota Celica GT-Four	Neal Bates Motorsport
1993	World Rally Championship	45th	Toyota Celica GT-Four	Neal Bates Motorsport
1993	Australian Rally Championship	1st	Toyota Celica GT-Four	Neal Bates Motorsport
1994	Australian Rally Championship	1st	Toyota Celica GT-Four	Neal Bates Motorsport
1995	World Rally Championship	27th	Toyota Celica GT-Four	Neal Bates Motorsport
1995	Australian Rally Championship	1st	Toyota Celica GT-Four	Neal Bates Motorsport
1996	Australian Rally Championship	2nd	Toyota Celica GT-Four	Neal Bates Motorsport
1997	World Rally Championship	26th	Toyota Corolla WRC	Neal Bates Motorsport
1997	Australian Rally Championship	3rd	Toyota Corolla WRC	Neal Bates Motorsport
1997	Australian Super Touring Championship	13th	Toyota Camry	Phoenix Motorsport
1997	Australian GT Production Car Championship	13th	Porsche 993 RSCS	
1998	Australian Rally Championship	2nd	Toyota Corolla WRC	Neal Bates Motorsport
1999	Australian Rally Championship	2nd	Toyota Corolla WRC	Neal Bates Motorsport
1999	V8 Supercar Championship Series	31st	Ford AU Falcon	Ford Tickford Racing
2000	Australian Rally Championship	2nd	Toyota Corolla WRC	Neal Bates Motorsport
2001	Australian Rally Championship	2nd	Toyota Corolla WRC	Neal Bates Motorsport
2001	Australian Nations Cup Championship	13th	Porsche 996 GT3	Tekno Autosports
2002	V8 Supercar Championship Series	43rd	Ford AU Falcon	00 Motorsport
2003	Australian Rally Championship	8th	Toyota Corolla Sportivo Turbo	Neal Bates Motorsport
2003	V8 Supercar Championship Series	65th	Ford AU Falcon	ICS Team Ford
2004	Australian Rally Championship	6th	Toyota Corolla Sportivo Turbo	Neal Bates Motorsport
2005	Australian Rally Championship	6th	Toyota Corolla Sportivo Turbo	Neal Bates Motorsport
2006	Australian Rally Championship	2nd	Toyota Corolla Sportivo Turbo	Neal Bates Motorsport
2007	Australian Rally Championship	2nd	Toyota Corolla S2000	Neal Bates Motorsport
2008	Australian Rally Championship	1st	Toyota Corolla S2000	Neal Bates Motorsport
2009	Australian Rally Championship	3rd	Toyota Corolla S2000	Neal Bates Motorsport
2012	Australian Classic Rally Championship	1st	Toyota Celica	Neal Bates Motorsport

=== WRC results ===
Year	Entrant	Car	1	2	3	4	5	6	7	8	9	10	11	12	13	14	WDC	Points
1990	Toyota Team Australia	Toyota Celica 2000 GT	MON	POR	KEN	FRA	GRC	NZL	ARG	FIN	AUS; 26	ITA	CIV	GBR			NC	0
1991	Toyota Team Europe	Toyota Celica GT-Four	MON	SWE	POR	KEN	FRA	GRC	NZL	ARG	FIN	AUS; 5	ITA	CIV	ESP	GBR	56th	2
1993	Neal Bates Motorsport	Toyota Celica Turbo 4WD	MON	SWE	POR	KEN	FRA	GRE	ARG	NZL	FIN	AUS; 8	ITA	ESP	GBR		45th	3
1995	Neal Bates Motorsport	Toyota Celica GT-Four	MON	SWE	POR	FRA	NZL	AUS; 9	ESP	GBR							27th	2
1996	Neal Bates Motorsport	Toyota Celica GT-Four	SWE	KEN	IDN	ARG	FIN	AUS; Ret	ITA	ESP							NC	0
1997	Toyota Castrol Team	Toyota Corolla WRC	MON	SWE	KEN	POR	ESP	FRA	ARG	GRE	NZL; 6	FIN	IDN; Ret	ITA			27th	1
1997	Neal Bates Motorsport	Toyota Celica GT-Four													AUS; 8	GBR	27th	1
1998	Neal Bates Motorsport	Toyota Corolla WRC	MON	SWE	KEN	POR	ESP	FRA	ARG	GRE	NZL	FIN	ITA	AUS; 12	GBR		NC	0
1999	Neal Bates Motorsport	Toyota Corolla WRC	MON	SWE	KEN	POR	ESP	FRA	ARG	GRE	NZL	FIN	CHN	ITA	AUS; Ret	GBR	NC	0
2000	Neal Bates Motorsport	Toyota Corolla WRC	MON	SWE	KEN	POR	ESP	ARG	GRE	NZL	FIN	CYP	FRA	ITA	AUS; 9	GBR	NC	0
2001	Neal Bates Motorsport	Toyota Corolla WRC	MON	SWE	POR	ESP	ARG	CYP	GRE	KEN	FIN	NZL	ITA	FRA	AUS; Ret	GBR	NC	0
2009	Neal Bates Motorsport	Toyota Corolla TRD S2000	IRE	NOR	CYP	POR	ARG	ITA	GRE	POL	FIN	AUS; NC	ESP	GBR			NC	0

=== Complete Bathurst 1000 results ===
Year	Team	Co-drivers	Car	Class	Laps	Pos.	Class pos.
1989	Toyota Team Australia	(Australia) Mike Dowson	Toyota Corolla FX-GT	C	141	17th	1st
1990	Toyota Team Australia	(Australia) John Faulkner	Toyota Corolla FX-GT	C	59	DNF	DNF
1991	Toyota Team Australia	(Australia) Rick Bates	Toyota Corolla FX-GT	3	76	DNF	DNF
1992	Toyota Team Australia	(Australia) Rick Bates	Toyota Corolla FX-GT	B	125	24th	3rd
1993	Caltex CXT Racing Team	(Australia) John Smith	Toyota Corolla Seca	B	113	DNF	DNF
1997*	Phoenix Motorsport	(Australia) Mark Adderton	Toyota Camry	-	64	DNF	DNF
1998	Paul Weel Racing	(Australia) Paul Weel	Ford EL Falcon	OC	155	9th	9th
1999	Glenn Seton Racing	(Australia) Geoff Brabham	Ford AU Falcon	-	159	10th	10th
2000	Ford Tickford Racing	(Australia) Wayne Gardner	Ford AU Falcon	-	45	DNF	DNF
2002	Gibson Motorsport	(Australia) Rodney Forbes	Ford AU Falcon	-	159	14th	14th
2003	ICS Team Ford	(Australia) Rick Bates	Ford AU Falcon	-	62	DNF	DNF

* Super Touring race

=== Complete Sandown endurance results ===
Year	Team	Co-drivers	Car	Class	Laps	Pos.	Class pos.
1989	Toyota Team Australia	(Australia) Mike Dowson	Toyota Corolla FX-GT	A	142	11th	2nd
1990	Toyota Team Australia	(Australia) John Faulkner	Toyota Corolla FX-GT	V8	85	DNF	DNF
1998	Paul Weel Racing	(Australia) Paul Weel	Ford EL Falcon	OC	122	DNF	DNF
2001	Tekno Autosports	(Australia) Steve Webb	Porsche 996 GT3	N	161	2nd	2nd
2003	ICS Team Ford	(Australia) Rick Bates	Ford AU Falcon	-	136	25th	25th

=== Complete Bathurst/Eastern Creek 12 Hour results ===
Year	Team	Co-drivers	Car	Class	Laps	Pos.	Class pos.
1991	(Australia) Neal Bates Motorsport	(Australia) Rick Bates (Australia) Geoff Morgan	Toyota Celica	B	214	17th	1st
1992	(Australia) Mountain Motorsport	(Australia) Geoffrey Full (Australia) Geoffrey Forshaw	Toyota Supra	T	212	34th	5th
1993	(Australia) Peter Whitaker	(Australia) Peter Whitaker (Australia) Calvin Gardner	Toyota MR2	S	240	9th	2nd
1994	(Australia) Neal Bates Motorsport	(Argentina) Juan Manuel Fangio II (Australia) Rick Bates	Toyota MR2	S	249	4th	1st
1995	(Australia) Rick Bates	(Australia) John Ribeiro (Australia) Peter Dane	PRB Clubman	S	240	20th	1st
2007	(Australia) Colin Osborne	(Australia) Colin Osborne (Australia) John Roecken	Toyota Celica SX	E	240	11th	1st
2008	(Australia) Colin Osborne	(Australia) Colin Osborne (Australia) John Roecken	Toyota Celica	E	234	11th	1st
2009	(Australia) Colin Osborne	(Australia) Colin Osborne (Australia) John Roecken	Toyota Celica ZR	F	172	DNF	DNF

Sporting positions
Preceded by Robb Herridge	Australian Rally Champion; 1993, 1994 & 1995	Succeeded by Possum Bourne
Preceded by Andrew Miedecke	Targa Tasmania; 1995	Succeeded by Jim Richards
Preceded by Simon Evans	Australian Rally Champion; 2008	Succeeded by Simon Evans
Awards and achievements
Preceded by Craig Lowndes	Peter Brock Medal; 2013	Succeeded by Jim Richards
