= 1994 Bathurst 12 Hour =

Endurance motor racing event

1994 James Hardie 12 Hour

Seasons
- ← 1993 1995 →

Layout of the Mount Panorama Circuit

The 1994 James Hardie 12 Hour was an endurance race for production cars held at the Mount Panorama Circuit, Bathurst, New South Wales, Australia on 3 April 1994. It was the fourth running of the "Bathurst 12 Hour". The race was open to cars of which at least ten examples had been sold and registered for use on Australian roads. Modifications in line with Group 3E Series Production Cars regulations, as published by the Confederation of Australian Motor Sport, were permitted.

The race was won by Gregg Hansford and Neil Crompton driving a Mazda RX-7 for BP Mazda Motorsport.

== Class structure ==
The field for the event was divided into the following seven classes:

- Class A : Small cars up to 1850cc
- Class B : Medium cars 1801-2500cc
- Class C : Large cars 2601-4000cc
- Class S : Sports Cars up to 2200cc
- Class T : Turbo and four-wheel-drive cars
- Class V : V8 engines / high performance six cylinder cars
- Class X : Extra high performance cars

== Results ==
Position	Drivers	No.	Car	Entrant	Class	Laps
1	Gregg Hansford; Neil Crompton	7	Mazda RX-7	BP Mazda Motorsport	X	262
2	Peter Fitzgerald; Jim Richards; Nicolas Leutwiler	4	Porsche 968CS	Falken Tyres / Hardie Dux HotWater Systems	X	262
3	Brad Jones; Brett Peters; Geoff Morgan	14	Porsche 968CS	Falken Tyres / Hardie Dux HotWater Systems	X	258
4	Juan Manuel Fangio II; Neal Bates; Rick Bates	2	Toyota MR2	Rick Bates	S	249
5	John Smith; Jason Bargwanna; Scott Bargwanna	30	Toyota MR2	Mercantile Mutual Dealer Team	S	248
6	Dick Johnson; Steven Johnson; Danny Osborne	17	Ford EB Falcon XR6	Dick Johnson Racing	V	245
7	John Bourke; Matthew Martin; Wayne Park	11	Subaru Impreza WRX	John Bourke	T	245
8	Graham Neilsen; Bill Gillespie; Keith Carling	10	Maserati Shamal	Falken Tyres	X	245
9	Andrew Wilson; Russell Becker; Chris Walker	33	Honda Integra VTi-R	Andrew Wilson	S	241
10	John Trimbole; Ron Barnacle	22	Mitsubishi Lancer GSR	Metropolis City Promotions	T	241
11	Andrew Solness; Gary Merlino; Michael Craig	23	Mitsubishi Lancer GSR	Andrew Solness	T	239
12	Mark Brame; Henry Draper; Barry Devlin	43	Suzuki Swift GTi	Mark Brame	A	237
13	Kevin Burton; Richard Vorst; Darren Pate	20	Ford EB Falcon SS	Kevin Burton	V	236
14	John Morriss; Phil Morriss; Craig Lowndes	36	Nissan Pulsar SSS	John Morriss	B	236
15	Chris Wiles; Glenn Clark	45	Ford Laser TX3	Chris Wiles	A	235
16	Ron Masing; Rod Jones	26	Mitsubishi Lancer GSR	Ron Masing	T	235
17	Mark Ferrier; Neal Robson; Phillip Parsons	54	Honda Civic	Mark Ferrier	A	235
18	Bill Harris; Glenn Jordan; Paul Wilken	47	Suzuki Swift GTi	P Wilken	A	235
19	Phil Alexander; Warren Rush; Geoff Forshaw	35	Nissan Pulsar SSS	Procar Racing Pty Ltd	B	235
20	Chris Sexton; Allan Letcher	49	Ford EB Falcon XR6	Chris Sexton	V	234
21	Mal Rose; Ian Luff	44	Ford EB Falcon SS	Fairfax Community Newspapers	V	233
22	Terry Skene; Chis Madden	15	Ford EB Falcon SS	Spirit of Logan	V	230
23	Brian Callaghan; Michelle Callaghan; Chris Symonds	55	Toyota Corolla GTi	Brian Callaghan Jnr	A	229
24	Bob Griffin; Ken Neale; Ray Vincent	16	Holden VP Commodore SS	David Little	V	226
25	Peter Brock; Tony Scott	05	Volvo 850 T-5	Volvo Cars Australia	T	225
26	Peter McLeod; Peter Dane; Des Wall	50	Mazda RX-7	Peter McLeod	X	225
27	Bill Seiders; Jeff Edwards; Paul Flottman	42	Ford EB Falcon S	Sydney Allen Printers	C	217
28	Martin Welsh; Keith McCulloch; Dennis Rogers	34	Nissan Pulsar SSS	Procar Racing Pty Ltd	B	211
29	David Sala; Steve Swaine; Peter Vorst	12	Holden VP Commodore SS	David Sala	V	210
30	Steve Hardman; Daryl Smith; Keith Forbes	40	Hyundai Lantra GLS Levant	Steve Hardman	A	209
31	Bevan Purcell; Troy Curling	37	Nissan Pintara TRX	Bevan Purcell	B	165
DNF	Murray Carter; Ed Lamont; Damon Beck	18	Nissan Pulsar SSS	Murray Carter	B	225
DNF	Danny Bogut; Cameron McConville	39	Mazda 626	Danny Bogut	B	218
DNF	Kent Youlden; John English; Terry Shiel	6	Volvo 850 GLT	Volvo Cars Australia	B	199
DNF	Rod Wilson; Andrew Newton; John Pollard	28	Honda Integra VTiR	Rod Wilson	S	191
DNF	Garry Waldon; Mark Skaife	1	Mazda RX-7	BP Mazda Motorsport	X	168
DNF	Ken Douglas; Phil Kirkham	32	Mazda 626	Rebound Sportswear	B	159
DNF	George Santana; Carl Schembri	56	Honda CRX	Revolution Racegear	S	131
DNF	Colin Osborne; Kevin Bryn; Tony Regan	52	Toyota Corolla GTi	Colin Osborne	A	125
DNF	Gary Hinton; Kurt Kratzmann; Peter Briely	25	Toyota Celica Group A Rallye	G Hinton	T	122
DNF	Alan Jones; John Bowe; Neville Crichton	9	BMW M3	Neville Crichton	X	120
DNF	Peter Hopwood; Terry Bosnjak; Warwick Rooklyn	8	Mazda RX-7	Peter Hopwood	X	120
DNF	Brian Wilshire; Gerard McConkey; Graham Gulson	19	Nissan Pulsar SSS	Murray Carter	B	114
DNF	Heather Baillie; Gwenda Searle	3	Toyota Celica ZR	Rick Bates	S	112
DNF	Dennis Cribben; Ryan McLeod; Geoff Fickling	51	Citroen BX 16V	Peter McLeod	B	110
DNF	Richard Wilson; Troy Nicholson; Roland Hill	21	Holden VN Commodore SS Group A SV	Richard Wilson	V	101
DNF	Chris Kousparis; Paul Barrett; Anthony Wilson	41	Nissan Pulsar SSS	Nepean EFI	B	99
DNF	Geoff Full; Richard Shaw; Jim Baird	53	Toyota Corolla GTi	Colin Osborne	A	94
DNF	Alf Grant; Tim Grant	57	Porsche 968CS	Alf Grant Racing	X	87
DNF	Tom Watkinson; Terry Lewis; Graham Blanch	46	Toyota Corolla GTi	Tom Watkinson	A	75
DNF	Harry Bargwanna; Chris Symmons	38	Nissan Pulsar SSS	Larry King	B	72
DNF	Calvin Gardiner; Mike Conway; Peter Verheyan	29	Toyota MR2	Acme Photo Video	S	71
DNF	Jim Faneco; Bryan Sala; George Parkinson	24	Hyundai S Coupe Turbo	James Faneco	T	66
DNF	Craig Dare; Chris Clearihan	27	Ford Laser TX3 4WD Turbo	Craig Dare	T	25

=== Notes ===
- Pole Position: Mark Skaife (Mazda RX-7), 2m 32.4837s
- Race time of winning car: 12h 1m 21.3868s
- Winning margin: 1m 15.6047s
