= Gregg Hansford =

Australian racing driver (1952–1995)

- Nationality: Australian
- Born: 8 April 1952; East Brisbane, Australia
- Died: 5 March 1995 (aged 42); Phillip Island, Victoria, Australia
Motorcycle racing career statistics
Grand Prix motorcycle racing
Active years	1978 - 1981
First race	1978 250cc Venezuelan Grand Prix
Last race	1981 500cc Dutch TT
First win	1978 250cc Spanish Grand Prix
Last win	1979 350cc Finnish Grand Prix
Team	Kawasaki
Championships	0
Starts / Wins / Podiums / Poles / F. laps / Points; 33 / 10 / 25 / 11 / 5 / 358

Gregory John Hansford (8 April 1952 – 5 March 1995) was an Australian professional motorcycle and touring car racer. He competed in the FIM Grand Prix motorcycle racing world championships from 1978 to 1981 and in Australian touring car championships from 1982 to 1994. Hansford was a two-time vice-champion in the 250cc road racing world championships. With 10 Grand Prix victories to his credit, he is ranked fourth for the most Grand Prix wins by an Australian behind Mick Doohan (54 wins), Casey Stoner (38) and Wayne Gardner (18).

After his international motorcycle racing career ended prematurely in 1981 due to serious injuries from a racing accident, Hansford returned to Australia and established himself as a competitive driver in Australian touring car competitions. Hansford's 1993 Bathurst 1000 victory gave him the unique distinction of winning a race at the Mount Panorama Circuit in both motorcycle and automobile racing events. He died in an accident while competing in a Supertouring race at the Phillip Island Grand Prix Circuit in 1995. In 2016 he was inducted into the Australian Motor Sport Hall of Fame.

== Motorcycle racing career ==
=== Early Australian racing ===
Hansford was born in East Brisbane, Queensland, Australia where he attended Milton State School (1958–1960), the Anglican Church Grammar School (1961–1967) and Brisbane State High School (1967–1969). He worked as a motorcycle mechanic and began racing motorcycles in 1971 with financial assistance from his mother.

Hansford began competitive motorcycle racing in dirt track racing and then motocross, before focusing on road racing in the early 1970s. John Taylor at Brisk Sales supported his early road racing career by offering him the opportunity to race a Kawasaki H1R, which led to an offer to race for the Brisbane Yamaha distributor, Annand and Thompson. He became known for his mastery of the Lakeside International Raceway, his home circuit near Brisbane.

In 1974, Yamaha introduced the TZ750 which would dominate the 750cc class during the 1970s. The Annand and Thompson-Yamaha team obtained one of the newly-released machines on which Hansford made his international racing debut at the 1974 Daytona 200, then considered one of the most prestigious motorcycle races in the world. However, during the race the motorcycle experienced ignition problems and he failed to finish.

Hansford returned to Australia where his battle with Warren Willing in the 1974 Unlimited Class Grand Prix at the Mount Panorama Circuit has been cited as one of the greatest Australian motorcycle races of the 1970s. Both competitors rode similar Yamaha TZ750s in an event that featured numerous lead changes throughout the 20 lap race, before Willing took the victory over Hansford by a narrow margin. Despite losing the Mount Panorama round, Hansford prevailed to win the 1974 Unlimited Class Australian national championship at the age of 21. The victory marked the first of six Australian motorcycle road racing National Championships in different classes that he won during his motorcycle racing career.

=== Kawasaki sponsorship ===
In 1975, Hansford was contracted by Kawasaki Australia to replace the injured rider, Ron Toombs. He and his Kawasaki co-rider, Murray Sayle, won the 1975 Castrol Six Hour Production Bike Race at Amaroo Park riding a Kawasaki Z1. He made his European debut at the French round of the 1975 FIM Formula 750 Championship held at the Magny-Cours Circuit. In a 1976 race held at the Laverton Air Force Base just outside Melbourne, Hansford rode the newly-released, water-cooled Kawasaki KR750 to victory over Grand Prix-winner, Pat Hennen.

Hansford returned to the Daytona 200 in 1977, where despite the domination of the 750cc class by the Yamaha TZ750, he posted a credible fourth place result as the highest-placed Kawasaki rider. Hansford’s KR750 lacked the power to compete with the Yamaha TZ750, but he made up the deficit with sheer ability. At the 1977 Laguna Seca round of the 750cc AMA National Championship divided into two heat races, he scored second and third place finishes, then defeated veteran Gary Nixon in a race long battle to win the 250cc class. At the Canadian round of the 1977 FIM Formula 750 Championship held at the Mosport Circuit on September 18, Hansford beat Yvon Duhamel and eventual Formula 750 champion, Steve Baker for the victory.

Hansford's international results were so impressive that, the annual motorsports publication, Motocourse, rated him as the number five rider in the world, despite the fact that he had never ridden in an FIM World Championship Grand Prix race.

=== World Championships ===
Hansford moved up to the 1978 Grand Prix World Championships as part of the Team Kawasaki Australia effort that consisted of the Kawasaki KR250 and KR350 as well as the KR750, with Hansford as the rider and Neville Doyle as manager and mechanic. Their plan was to contest the world 250cc and 350cc world championships and, whatever Formula 750 events that their schedule allowed.

Hansford would face a field of rivals who mostly competed on privateer Yamaha TZ 250s and TZ 350s, but his most significant rival was South African, Kork Ballington, riding similar Kawasaki KRs supported by Kawasaki’s British importer. Ballington's small physique gave him an advantage over the larger and heavier Hansford, who stood over 6 ft 0 in (1.83 m). Not only did this give Ballington a power-to-weight advantage, his small physique also gave him an aerodynamic advantage by allowing him to tuck his body behind his motorcycle's windscreen, while Hansford's limbs protruded beyond his windscreen.

In his world championship debut at the 1978 Venezuelan Grand Prix, Hansford suffered a poor start in the 350cc race and was outside of the top twenty after the first lap. He recovered in an impressive manner to take the race lead after four laps and had a three-quarter lap lead over the opposition when his motorcycle had a mechanical failure. He also dropped out of the 250cc Grand Prix with mechanical problems while holding third place.

At the following 1978 Spanish Grand Prix, Hansford was initially denied an entry by Spanish race organizers who claimed that he was not on the official FIM grading list. As Hansford had withdrawn from the previous Grand Prix in Venezuela without a result, Spanish race organizers claimed to have no record of Hansford's previous 250cc class experience. Eventually the FIM relented and Hansford was allowed to race, but with only one qualifying session left. Hansford posted a qualifying time 0.1 seconds behind pole sitter, Kenny Roberts, then won the race over Roberts to claim his maiden Grand Prix victory.

At the 1978 French Grand Prix, Hansford won both the 250cc and 350cc classes, the first of three 250/350 double victories in 1978. Ballington beat Hansford by a half a wheel in the 250cc Nations Grand Prix at Mugello and both riders were credited with identical race times.

Hansford demonstrated his ability to learn new circuits at the 1978 Swedish Grand Prix where he claimed the pole position for the 350cc class with a faster lap time than the 500cc class pole sitter, Johnny Cecotto. At the German Grand Prix held at the daunting, 14.2 miles (22.9 km) long Nürburgring racetrack, considered too dangerous for the Formula One championship, Hansford was the fastest 250cc and 350cc qualifier, on his first visit to the circuit.

Ballington won three of the last five 250cc races to edge out Hansford for the championship by six points. Ballington also claimed the 350cc World Championship, while Yamaha's Takazumi Katayama finished in second by a narrow one point margin over Hansford. At the end of the 1978 World Championship season, Hansford had won seven 250cc and 350cc Grand Prix races.

After Pat Hennen suffered career-ending injuries while competing in the 1978 Isle of Man TT, the Suzuki factory racing team attempted to replace the American rider during the off-season by offering Hansford a contract to join their team as Barry Sheene's teammate in the 500cc class for the 1979 season. However, Hansford rejected Suzuki's offer, choosing to remain loyal to the Kawasaki team.

Hansford suffered injuries while testing his motorcycle prior to the 1979 season. His injuries and tire problems led to a slow start in which he failed to score any points until the fourth round when he won the 350cc Nations Grand Prix at the Imola Circuit. At mid-season, the team switched from Michelin to the Dunlop tires used by Ballington. Hansford would win three Grand Prix races in 1979, all in the 350cc class. Once again, he finished second in the 250 championship and third in the 350. His victory at the 1979 350cc Finnish Grand Prix marked the final victory of his motorcycle racing career. He also rode the KR750 to win the French round of the 1979 Formula 750 championship, held at the Nogaro Circuit.

=== 1979 riders' revolt ===
During the 1979 season, the riders had boycotted the 1979 Belgian Grand Prix due to the dangerous track surface. The circuit had been paved just days before the race, creating a track that many of the racers felt was unsafe due to diesel fuel seeping to the surface. The event highlighted the animosity between motorcycle racers and the FIM concerning track safety. At the time, many motorcycle Grand Prix races were still being held on street circuits with hazards such as telephone poles and railroad crossings. Dedicated race tracks of the time were also dangerous for motorcycle racers due to the steel Armco trackside barriers preferred by car racers. Rather than suitable financial compensation for risking their lives, race organizers expected riders to race for prestige and the opportunity to compete for world championship points. In 1956, the reigning 500 cc world champion, Geoff Duke and thirteen other riders were given six-month suspensions for merely threatening to strike.

Yamaha rider Kenny Roberts began talking to the press about forming a rival racing series to compete against the FIM's monopoly. At the end of the 1979 season, Hansford joined Roberts, Barry Sheene and British motorsports journalist, Barry Coleman, in announcing their intention to break away from the FIM and create a rival race series called the World Series, with most of the top Grand Prix racers joining in the revolt. The Yamaha factory then offered Hansford a chance to replace Roberts and compete in 1980 500cc FIM World Championship, however he chose to remain loyal to the rival race series and rejected their offer.

When the rival race series collapsed due to difficulties in securing enough race venues, Yamaha withdrew their offer as Roberts returned as their factory sponsored rider, leaving Hansford without a place on a 500cc class team. Rather than staying in Europe to race in the smaller classes, Hansford chose to return home and raced Kawasaki 250s and 350s in the 1980 Australia national championships, while Kawasaki developed their new KR500 for the FIM 500cc World Championship.

Hansford made only one appearance in the 1980 World Championships at the final round in Germany, where he debuted the new KR500 featuring a monocoque chassis, but retired with a mechanical issue. At the prestigious Suzuka 8 Hours endurance race in 1980, he teamed with Eddie Lawson riding a modified Kawasaki Kz1000 to a second place behind Wes Cooley and Graeme Crosby on a Yoshimura-GS1000.

=== Belgian Grand Prix accident ===
The Kawasaki factory launched a full effort in the 1981 500cc World Championship, with Hansford and Ballington riding the KR500. He won the pole position at the Imola 200 pre-season race, but while avoiding slower riders, he hit a damp patch of track and crashed, sustaining a fractured tibia.

Upon his return to racing, he suffered another serious crash at the 1981 Belgian Grand Prix when his front brake disc calipers had been improperly replaced. When the brakes failed, Hansford entered an escape road used as an emergency run-off area and managed to slow the motorcycle to approximately 70 km/h with the rear brake, before hitting a car illegally parked by a track marshal. The accident broke the same femur that had been injured at Imola. More serious problems developed from blood clots in his thigh and it would take several years to recover, forcing Hansford's retirement from motorcycle racing.

Hansford returned to Australia where he owned motorcycle dealerships in Brisbane and a personal watercraft shop on the Gold Coast. He continued to develop his businesses however, he was compelled by his competitive nature to announce that he would pursue an auto racing career.

== Touring Cars ==
Hansford then turned to touring car racing in 1982 with Allan Moffat Racing. He had previous ties to the Moffat team and was actually entered to partner Colin Bond in the second Moffat Ford Dealers Ford Falcon in the 1977 Hardie-Ferodo 1000. However, a motorcycle racing crash caused injuries which saw Hansford forced to withdraw from the race and be replaced by open wheel driver Alan Hamilton. The car he was to drive with Bond finished second in Ford's famous 1–2 victory at Bathurst in 1977.

Hansford's first touring car race was in the second Moffat Mazda RX-7 at the 1982 Sandown 500 driving with young open wheel prospect Lucio Cesario. After the car failed to finish at Sandown, the pair were to drive the car in the 1982 James Hardie 1000 at Bathurst but a practice crash by Cesario saw them as non-starters in the race. Hansford then put in some good performances in the Mazda in the 1983 Australian Touring Car Championship. His first ATCC race was in Round 6 at Surfers Paradise where he qualified a surprising third behind Moffat and Brock and after missing a gear at the start and dropping to 11th at the first turn, put in a great drive to finish in 3rd place. He then finished in 6th place at Oran Park before finishing second to Peter Brock's Holden Dealer Team Commodore in the wet final round at Lakeside in Brisbane (Moffat finished 3rd to clinch his 4th ATCC). He then qualified 12th in the Mazda at the 1983 James Hardie 1000 (Moffat qualified his car 14th), though problems saw him and co-driver Garry Waldon not classified as finishers after only completing 49 laps. Moffat and Japanese driver Yoshimi Katayama finished second outright.

Hansford's first touring car win was the 1984 Oran Park 250 in the 1984 Australian Endurance Championship with team boss Allan Moffat in the RX-7. Moffat, who was making his comeback to racing after a crash earlier in the year at Surfers Paradise, started the race from pole and although suffering from the flu handed the car to Hansford in the lead ahead of 1984 ATCC winner Dick Johnson in his Ford XE Falcon, a lead the former Grand Prix Motorcycle star would not lose.

Later, the pair finished second in the Mazda at the Castrol 500 at Sandown before they went on to finish third at the 1984 James Hardie 1000 at Bathurst. The Moffat team entered two cars for the race with Hansford listed in both cars alongside Moffat. Hansford won a number of fans by qualifying his RX-7 in eighth place and it was his car (which the team admitted was not meant to run the full race) that crossed the line third after Moffat's own car had been retired with overheating on lap 15.

After Australian touring car racing changed from the locally developed Group C rules to the international Group A rules in 1985, Hansford was forced to look elsewhere as Mazda (nor Moffat for the season) wouldn't be competing. Though at the start of 1985, the Moffat team took their Mazda RX-7, along with Peter McLeod and Kevin Bartlett to drive in the 24 Hours of Daytona. After Moffat qualified the car 38th in the GT class, they progressed through to the top-five in their class before engine problems saw them drop back to 24th outright at the end of the race.

Hansford then teamed with Moffat's former teammate Colin Bond to drive an Alfa Romeo GTV6 to eighth outright and first in Class B in the 1985 James Hardie 1000. The following year he joined fellow Queenslander Dick Johnson in a Ford Mustang GT and finished the 1986 James Hardie 1000 in fourth outright.

Hansford stayed with Dick Johnson Racing for the 1987 season, with the team running two new Ford Sierra RS Cosworth's in the 1987 Australian Touring Car Championship. The team endured a tough season with the fast but fragile turbo Sierras which were upgraded to the more reliable, and much more powerful RS500 version for the endurance races. The 1987 James Hardie 1000 was a disaster for the team with the Johnson/Hansford car retiring from the race with a mechanical failure after just 3 laps, while the team's second car retired one lap earlier after Neville Crichton crashed with the Holden Commodore of Larry Perkins.

Hansford was told by Dick Johnson at that year's Jack Newton Celebrity Pro-Am that he won't be driving for DJR in the 1988 Australian Touring Car season and was replaced with former dual Australian Drivers' Champion John Bowe. He again linked with Allan Moffat and the pair went on to win the Enzed 500 at Sandown driving a Ruedi Eggenberger built Ford Sierra RS500. The pair were joined by Eggenberger's ace West German driver Klaus Niedzwiedz at the 1988 Tooheys 1000 at Bathurst (with Eggenberger himself engineering the car for the race), and were leading by almost a lap on lap 129 when the car suffered engine failure with Hansford at the wheel (the turbocharged engine suffered a head gasket failure).

Hansford would drive the RS500 Sierras for both Allan Moffat and Glenn Seton Racing in both the ATCC and at Bathurst over the next four seasons, though on-track results would elude him. He finished 2nd at the 1993 James Hardie 12 Hour with Charlie O'Brien in a Mazda RX-7 and won the 1993 Tooheys 1000 at Bathurst with Larry Perkins in a Holden Commodore (VP). Hansford's 1993 Bathurst 1000 victory gave him the unique distinction of winning a race at the Mount Panorama Circuit in both motorcycle and car racing.

Hansford followed this success with a victory at the 1994 James Hardie 12 Hour with television commentator turned race driver Neil Crompton, again in an RX-7. Such performances earned him further respect and drives in both V8 Supercars and Super Touring, with highlights being third in the 1994 Tooheys 1000 and third in the 1994 Sandown 500 all partnered with Larry Perkins in a Holden VP Commodore.

== Death ==
While competing in a Supertouring race in 1995 at Phillip Island, Hansford's Ford Mondeo slid off the track and hit a tyre wall at high speed. The car bounced back onto the track where he was hit by Mark Adderton's Peugeot 405 at over 200 km/h. Hansford died moments after the impact. At the time of his death, his youngest son Harrison, born to model Carolyn Donovan, was only eight months old.

In 2007, Hansford's older sons from his marriage to Julie-Anne, Ryan and Rhys had made their first steps into a motor racing career and Ryan presently (2025) competes in Touring Car Masters. Ryan previously competed in the Australian Mini Challenge and V8 Ute Racing Series.

Hansford is buried in Brisbane's Pinnaroo Lawn Cemetery.

== Career summary ==
Season	Series	Position	Machine	Team
1974	Australian Unlimited Motorcycle Series	1st	Yamaha TZ750	Annand and Thompson-Yamaha
1978	250 cc World Championship	2nd	Kawasaki KR250	Team Kawasaki Australia
1978	350 cc World Championship	3rd	Kawasaki KR350	Team Kawasaki Australia
1979	250 cc World Championship	2nd	Kawasaki KR250	Team Kawasaki Australia
1979	350 cc World Championship	3rd	Kawasaki KR350	Team Kawasaki Australia
1980	350 cc World Championship	15th	Kawasaki KR350	Team Kawasaki Australia
1982	Australian Endurance Championship	NC	Mazda RX-7	Peter Stuyvesant International Racing
1983	Australian Touring Car Championship	8th	Mazda RX-7	Peter Stuyvesant International
1983	Australian Endurance Championship	6th	Mazda RX-7	Peter Stuyvesant International
1984	Australian Endurance Championship	2nd	Mazda RX-7	Peter Stuyvesant International Racing
1985	Australian Touring Car Championship	28th	Alfa Romeo GTV6	Network Alfa / The Toy Shop
1985	Australian Endurance Championship	7th	Alfa Romeo GTV6	Network Alfa
1986	Australian Touring Car Championship	30th	BMW 635 CSi	Charlie O'Brien
1986	Australian Endurance Championship	28th	Ford Mustang GT	Palmer Tube Mills
1987	Australian Touring Car Championship	10th	Ford Sierra RS Cosworth	Shell Ultra Hi-Tech Racing Team
1987	World Touring Car Championship	NC	Ford Sierra RS500	Shell Ultra Hi-Tech Racing Team
1988	Australian Touring Car Championship	NC	Ford Sierra RS500	Allan Moffat Enterprises
1988	Asia-Pacific Touring Car Championship	NC	Ford Sierra RS500	Allan Moffat Enterprises
1989	Australian Touring Car Championship	15th	Ford Sierra RS500	Allan Moffat Enterprises
1990	Australian Touring Car Championship	10th	Ford Sierra RS500	Allan Moffat Enterprises
1991	Australian Endurance Championship	24th	Ford Sierra RS500	Peter Jackson Racing
1994	Australian Super Production Car Series	7th	Mazda RX-7	Mazda

=== Motorcycle Grand Prix results ===
**Position**	1	2	3	4	5	6	7	8	9	10
**Points**	15	12	10	8	6	5	4	3	2	1

(key) (Races in bold indicate pole position; races in italics indicate fastest lap)

Year	Class	Team	Machine	1	2	3	4	5	6	7	8	9	10	11	12	13	Points	Rank	Wins
1978	250cc	Team Kawasaki Australia	KR250	VEN; NC	ESP; 1		FRA; 1	NAT; 2	NED; 3	BEL	SWE; 1	**FIN**; 2	GBR	**GER**; 2	CZE; 2	YUG; 1	118	2nd	4
1978	350cc	Team Kawasaki Australia	KR350	VEN; NC		AUT; 7	FRA; 1	NAT; 2	NED; 8		SWE; 1	FIN	GBR	GER	CZE; 2	YUG; 1	76	3rd	3
1979	250cc	Team Kawasaki Australia	KR250	VEN; 7		GER; 6	NAT	**ESP**; 2	**YUG**; 2	NED; 2	BEL; DNS	**SWE**; 2	FIN; 2	GBR	CZE	**FRA**; 2	81	2nd	0
1979	350cc	Team Kawasaki Australia	KR350	VEN	AUT	GER	NAT; 1	ESP; 2	YUG	NED; 1			FIN; 1	GBR; 2	CZE; 4	FRA	77	3rd	3
1980	350cc	Team Kawasaki Australia	KR350	NAT		FRA		NED			GBR	CZE	GER; 5				6	15th	0
1980	500cc	Team Kawasaki Australia	KR500	NAT	ESP	FRA		NED	BEL	FIN	GBR		GER; NC				0	-	0
1981	500cc	Team Kawasaki Australia	KR500	AUT	GER	NAT	FRA	YUG	NED; NC	BEL	SM	GBR	FIN	SWE			0	-	0

== Car Racing ==
=== Complete Australian Touring Car Championship results ===
(key) (Races in bold indicate pole position) (Races in italics indicate fastest lap)

Year	Team	Car	1	2	3	4	5	6	7	8	9	10	DC	Points
1983	Peter Stuyvesant International Racing	Mazda RX-7	CAL	SAN	SYM	WAN	AIR	SUR; 3	ORA; 6	LAK; 2			8th	56
1985	The Toy Shop Network Alfa	Alfa Romeo GTV6	WIN	SAN	SYM	WAN	AIR	CAL	SUR	LAK	AMA	ORA; 10	28th	11
1986	Charlie O'Brien	BMW 635 CSi	AMA	SYM	SAN	AIR	WAN	SUR; 8	CAL	LAK	WIN	ORA	30th	10
1987	Shell Ultra-Hi Tech Racing Team	Ford Sierra RS Cosworth	CAL; Ret	SYM; 6	LAK; DSQ	WAN; 5	AIR; Ret	SUR; Ret	SAN; Ret	AMA; 8	ORA; Ret		10th	25
1988	Allan Moffat Enterprises	Ford Sierra RS500	CAL	SYM	WIN	WAN	AIR	LAK	SAN	AMA	ORA; 14		NC	0
1989	Allan Moffat Enterprises	Ford Sierra RS500	AMA	SYM	LAK; 5	WAN	MAL	SAN	WIN; 11	ORA			15th	4
1990	Allan Moffat Enterprises	Ford Sierra RS500	AMA; 6	SYM; 8	PHI; 5	WIN; 11	LAK; Ret	MAL	WAN	ORA			10th	17

=== Complete World Touring Car Championship results ===
(key) (Races in bold indicate pole position) (Races in italics indicate fastest lap)

Year	Team	Car	1	2	3	4	5	6	7	8	9	10	11	DC	Points
1987	(Australia) Shell Ultra Hi-Tech Racing Team	Ford Sierra RS500	MNZ	JAR	DIJ	NUR	SPA	BNO	SIL	BAT; Ret	CLD; Ret	WEL; Ret	FJI	NC	0

† Not registered for series & points

=== Complete Asia-Pacific Touring Car Championship results ===
(key) (Races in bold indicate pole position) (Races in italics indicate fastest lap)

Year	Team	Car	1	2	3	4	DC	Points
1988	(Australia) Allan Moffat Enterprises	Ford Sierra RS500	BAT; Ret	WEL	PUK	FJI	NC	0

=== Complete Bathurst 1000 results ===
Year	Team	Co-drivers	Car	Class	Laps	Pos.	Class pos.
1982	(Australia) Peter Stuyvesant International Racing	(Australia) Lucio Cesario	Mazda RX-7	A	-	DNS	DNS
1983	(Australia) Peter Stuyvesant International	(Australia) Garry Waldon	Mazda RX-7	A	49	DNF	DNF
1984	(Australia) Peter Stuyvesant International Racing	(Canada) Allan Moffat	Mazda RX-7	Group C	161	3rd	3rd
1984	(Australia) Peter Stuyvesant International Racing	(Canada) Allan Moffat	Mazda RX-7	Group C	15	DNF	DNF
1985	(Australia) Network Alfa	(Australia) Colin Bond	Alfa Romeo GTV6	B	158	8th	1st
1986	(Australia) Palmer Tube Mills	(Australia) Dick Johnson	Ford Mustang GT	C	162	4th	3rd
1987	(Australia) Shell Ultra Hi-Tech Racing Team	(Australia) Dick Johnson	Ford Sierra RS500	1	3	DNF	DNF
1988	(Australia) Allan Moffat Enterprises	(West Germany) Klaus Niedzwiedz (Canada) Allan Moffat	Ford Sierra RS500	A	129	DNF	DNF
1989	(Australia) Allan Moffat Enterprises	(Belgium) Pierre Dieudonné	Ford Sierra RS500	A	30	DNF	DNF
1990	(Australia) Allan Moffat Enterprises	(Belgium) Pierre Dieudonné (West Germany) Klaus Niedzwiedz	Ford Sierra RS500	A	138	DNF	DNF
1991	(Australia) Peter Jackson Racing	(Australia) Glenn Seton	Ford Sierra RS500	A	146	9th	8th
1992	(Australia) Allan Moffat Enterprises	(West Germany) Klaus Niedzwiedz	Ford Sierra RS500	A	128	19th	17th
1993	(Australia) Castrol Perkins Racing	(Australia) Larry Perkins	Holden VP Commodore	A	161	1st	1st
1994	(Australia) Castrol Perkins Racing	(Australia) Larry Perkins	Holden VP Commodore	A	161	3rd	3rd

=== Complete 24 Hours of Daytona results ===
Year	Team	Co-drivers	Car	Class	Laps	Pos.	Class pos.
1985	(Australia) Allan Moffat Racing	(Canada) Allan Moffat (Australia) Kevin Bartlett (Australia) Peter McLeod	Mazda RX-7	GTO	482	24th	7th

=== Complete Sandown 400/500 results ===
Year	Team	Co-drivers	Car	Class	Laps	Pos.	Class pos.
1982	(Australia) Peter Stuyvesant International Racing	(Australia) Lucio Cesario	Mazda RX-7	D	NA	DNF	DNF
1983	(Australia) Peter Stuyvesant International	(Australia) Garry Waldon	Mazda RX-7	Over 3000cc	122	6th	6th
1984	(Australia) Peter Stuyvesant International Racing	(Canada) Allan Moffat	Mazda RX-7	Over 3000cc	128	2nd	2nd
1985	(Australia) Network Alfa	(Australia) Colin Bond	Alfa Romeo GTV6	B	126	4th	2nd
1986	(Australia) Palmer Tube Mills	(Australia) Dick Johnson	Ford Mustang GT	B	16	DNF	DNF
1987	(Australia) Shell Ultra Hi-Tech Racing Team	(Australia) Dick Johnson (New Zealand) Neville Crichton	Ford Sierra RS500	B	86	DNF	DNF
1987	(Australia) Shell Ultra Hi-Tech Racing Team	(Australia) Dick Johnson	Ford Sierra RS500	B	-	DNS	DNS
1988	(Australia) Allan Moffat Enterprises	(Canada) Allan Moffat	Ford Sierra RS500	A	129	1st	1st
1989	(Australia) Allan Moffat Enterprises	(Canada) Allan Moffat	Ford Sierra RS500	A	12	DNF	DNF
1990	(Australia) Allan Moffat Enterprises	(West Germany) Klaus Niedzwiedz	Ford Sierra RS500	Div.1	111	DNF	DNF
1991	(Australia) Peter Jackson Racing	(Australia) Glenn Seton	Ford Sierra RS500	A	146	DNF	DNF
1993	(Australia) Castrol Perkins Racing	(Australia) Larry Perkins	Holden VP Commodore	V8	101	DNF	DNF
1994	(Australia) Castrol Perkins Racing	(Australia) Larry Perkins	Holden VP Commodore	V8	161	3rd	3rd

=== Complete Bathurst 12 Hour results ===
Year	Team	Co-drivers	Car	Class	Laps	Pos.	Class pos.
1992	Mazda Australia	(Australia) John Bowe	Mazda RX-7	T	245	5th	3rd
1993	Mazda Australia	(Australia) Charlie O'Brien	Mazda RX-7	T	261	2nd	2nd
1994	(Australia) BP Mazda Motorsport	(Australia) Neil Crompton	Mazda RX-7	X	262	1st	1st

== Bibliography ==
- Flack, Darryl (30 August 2023). The Immortals of Australian Motorcycle Racing: The World Champs (Part of the 7-volume comprehensive sports collection). Immortals of Australian Sport (7-book series). Gelding Street Press. ISBN 978-0-6452070-5-7.

Sporting positions
Preceded by George Fury; Terry Sheil	Winner of the Sandown 500; 1988 (with Allan Moffat)	Succeeded by Jim Richards; Mark Skaife
Preceded by Jim Richards; Mark Skaife	Winner of the Bathurst 1000; 1993 (with Larry Perkins)	Succeeded by Dick Johnson; John Bowe
Preceded by Alan Jones; Garry Waldon	Winner of the Bathurst 12 Hour; 1994 (with Neil Crompton)	Succeeded by Dick Johnson; John Bowe
