= 1992 Bathurst 12 Hour =

Endurance race

1992 James Hardie 12 Hour

Seasons
- ← 1991 1993 →

Layout of the Mount Panorama Circuit

The 1992 James Hardie 12 Hour was an endurance race for production cars staged at the Mount Panorama Circuit, Bathurst, New South Wales, Australia on 19 April 1992. It was the second running of the James Hardie 12 Hour.

Cars competed in six classes:

- Class A - Cars Under 1600cc
- Class B - Cars 1601 to 2500cc
- Class C - Cars 2501 to 4000cc
- Class D - Cars Over 4000cc
- Class S - Sports Cars Under 2200cc
- Class T - Turbo & Four Wheel Drive

The race was won by Charlie O'Brien, Garry Waldon and Mark Gibbs driving a Mazda RX-7 entered by Mazda Australia.

Allan Grice and Brad Jones raced a Holden VP Ute S (26th) sponsored by Akubra hats. Grice did his qualifying lap with a model of a blue cattle dog in the back of the ute. He entered the car due its V8 power and relatively light weight, though the weight distribution was such that he struggled with the handling of the car.

== Results ==
| Position | Drivers | No. | Car | Entrant | Class | Laps |
|---|---|---|---|---|---|---|
| 1 | Charlie O'Brien; Garry Waldon; Mark Gibbs | 17 | Mazda RX-7 | Mazda Australia | T | 254 |
| 2 | Neville Crichton; Alan Jones; Tony Longhurst | 20 | BMW M5 | BMW Australia Pty Ltd | C | 251 |
| 3 | Colin Bond; Glenn Seton; Ken Mathews | 8 | Saab 9000 CSS | Saab Automobile Australia | T | 250 |
| 4 | Warren Cullen; Glen Cullen; Kim Jane | 40 | Holden VN Commodore SS | Warren Cullen | D | 249 |
| 5 | John Bowe; Gregg Hansford | 7 | Mazda RX-7 | Mazda Australia | T | 245 |
| 6 | Graham Neilson; Wayne Park; Bill Gillespie | 3 | Holden VN Commodore SS Group A SV | Falken Tyres | D | 244 |
| 7 | Geoff Morgan; Keith Carling; Rick Bates | 28 | Toyota MR2 | John Smith | S | 243 |
| 8 | Peter McLeod; Peter Dane; Peter Janson | 16 | Citroën BX16 | Peter McLeod | B | 238 |
| 9 | Jim Baird; Andrew Solness; Keith McLelland | 77 | Ford EB Falcon S XR8 | James Baird | D | 238 |
| 10 | Mick Monterosso; Steve Monterosso; Mark Poole | 31 | Holden VN Commodore SS Group A SV | JV Crash | D | 237 |
| 11 | Mark Brame; Henry Draper; Clyde Lee | 56 | Suzuki Swift GTi | Mark Brame | A | 237 |
| 12 | Tom Watkinson; Garry Willmington; Terry Lewis | 49 | Toyota Corolla SX | Tom Watkinson | A | 237 |
| 13 | Peter Fitzgerald; Jim Zerefos; Brett Peters | 1 | Holden VN Commodore SS Group A SV | Hardie Dux Hot Water Systems | D | 236 |
| 14 | Peter Brock; Neil Crompton; Paul Gover | 45 | Peugeot 405 Mi16 | Peugeot Concessionaires Australia | B | 235 |
| 15 | Warwick Rooklyn; Mark Larkham; Jeff Hutchinson | 43 | Nissan Pulsar SSS | Gould Motorsport | B | 235 |
| 16 | Murray Carter; Ed Lamont | 18 | Nissan Pulsar SSS | Murray Carter | B | 233 |
| 17 | Melinda Price; Tracey Taylor; Michelle Callaghan | 22 | Nissan Pulsar SSS | Garry Rogers Motorsport | B | 232 |
| 18 | Andrew Wilson; Chris Walker; Geoff Crabtree | 55 | Suzuki Swift GTi | Chris Walker | A | 232 |
| 19 | Phil Alexander; Keith McCulloch; Warren Rush | 52 | Toyota Corolla SX | Phil Alexander | A | 231 |
| 20 | Sam Silvestro; Peter Godden; Ron Masing | 51 | Toyota Corolla SX | Colin Osborne | A | 230 |
| 21 | Harry Bargwanna; Brian Callaghan Jnr; Chris Symonds | 48 | Toyota Corolla | Larry King | A | 229 |
| 22 | Craig Dare; Brugestrass; Alan Curry | 57 | Suzuki Swift GTi | Craig Dare | A | 228 |
| 23 | Bill Harris; Ray Gulson; Glen Jordan | 53 | Suzuki Swift GTi | Bill Harris | A | 228 |
| 24 | David Sala; Steve Swaine; John Holmes | 47 | Toyota Corolla | David Sala | A | 228 |
| 25 | Mark Williamson; Ian Sawtell; Mike Reedy | 58 | Suzuki Swift GTi | Carrier Airconditioning | A | 227 |
| 26 | Allan Grice; Brad Jones; John Spencer | 9 | Holden VP Ute S | Akubra Felt Hats | D | 226 |
| 27 | John McEntee; Tim Slako; Geoff Leeds | 96 | Holden VN Commodore SS | WA Bathurst Assault Pty Ltd | D | 225 |
| 28 | Garry Rogers; Possum Bourne; Alf Barbagallo | 21 | Subaru Liberty RS | Garry Rogers Motorsport | T | 224 |
| 29 | Peter McKay; Ian Luff; Bob Jennings | 05 | Peugeot 405 Mi16 | Peugeot Concessionaires Australia | B | 223 |
| 30 | Ray Ryan; Jim Runciman; Harry Dutton | 23 | Nissan NX Coupe | Tubemakers of Australia | S | 222 |
| 31 | Bob Griffin; Trevor Hodge; Peter Taffa | 39 | Holden VN Commodore S | Bob Griffin | C | 221 |
| 32 | Mark Lyons; Darrell Dixon; Graham Lusty | 34 | Ford EA Falcon | Mark Lyons | C | 217 |
| 33 | Kevin Burton; Alan Lewis; Mark Arnold | 59 | Mitsubishi Lancer GSR | Kevin Burton | A | 214 |
| 34 | Geoffrey Full; Neal Bates; Geoffrey Forshaw | 15 | Toyota Supra | Mountain Motorsport | T | 212 |
| 35 | Mike Imrie; Grant Munday; Chris Clearihan | 46 | Saab 900i | MJ Imrie | B | 208 |
| 36 | Alan Letcher; Steve Hitzman; Phillip Johnson | 32 | Holden VN Commodore S | Alan Letcher | C | 207 |
| 37 | Rod Jones; Ed Ordynski; George Fury | 12 | Mitsubishi Galant VR4 | Rodney Jones | T | 202 |
| 38 | Peter Vorst; Richard Vorst; Paul Flottmann | 27 | Ford EA Falcon | Sydney Allen Printers | C | 193 |
| 39 | Gordon Leven; Wayne Bell; Gary McDonald | 36 | Holden VN Commodore S | Gordon Leven | C | 191 |
| DNF | Peter Whitaker; Calvin Gardiner; Peter Hopwood | 29 | Toyota MR2 | P Whitaker | S | 236 |
| DNF | Kent Youlden; Brett Youlden; Dick Johnson | 2 | Ford Laser TX3 | Ford Motor Co of Australia | T | 230 |
| DNF | Ian Palmer; John English; Brett Bull | 35 | Holden VP Commodore SS | Palmer Tube Mills | C | 205 |
| DNF | George Santana; Tony Farrell | 24 | Honda CRX | Autoventure | S | 197 |
| DNF | John Bourke; John Smith; Steve Griffiths | 4 | Toyota Supra | John Bourke | T | 189 |
| DNF | Glenn McIntyre; Graham Gulson; John Wright | 14 | Citroën BX16 | Peter McLeod | B | 185 |
| DNF | Steve Hardman; David Stone; Marc Ducquet | 10 | Hyundai Lantra | Steve Hardman | A | 161 |
| DNF | Warren Aubin; Jeff Edwards; Roland Hill | 37 | Holden VN Commodore S | Roland Hill | C | 138 |
| DNF | Colin Osborne; David Thomas; Keith Byrn | 50 | Toyota Corolla | Colin Osborne | A | 118 |
| DNF | Alf Grant; Jane Taylor; Peter Brierley | 41 | Holden VN Commodore S | P Brierley | C | 115 |
| DNF | Tony Scott; Terry Shiel; Graham Moore | 6 | Mitsubishi Galant VR4 | Team Mitsubishi Ralliart | T | 108 |
| DNF | Damon Beck; Brian Wilshire; Tony Greig | 87 | Nissan Pulsar SSS | Damon Beck | B | 65 |
| DNF | Mark McLaughlin; Troy Dunstan; David Parsons | 25 | Peugeot 405 Mi16 | Peugeot Concessionaires Australia | B | 27 |
| DNF | Glenn Clark; Ludwig Finauer; Christopher Wiles | 19 | Citroën BX16 | Peter McLeod | B | 17 |
| DNF | Lou Renato; Malcolm Stenniken; David James | 11 | Hyundai Lantra | Lou Renato | A | 17 |
| DNF | John Pollard; Rod Stevens; Ed Aitken | 26 | Honda CRX | Eric Houghton | S | 4 |
