= 1993 Bathurst 12 Hour =

Endurance motor racing event

1993 James Hardie 12 Hour

Seasons
- ← 1992 1994 →

Layout of the Mount Panorama Circuit

The 1993 James Hardie 12 Hour was an endurance race for production cars staged at the Mount Panorama Circuit, Bathurst, New South Wales, Australia on 11 April 1993. The race, which was the third James Hardie 12 Hour, was won by Alan Jones and Garry Waldon driving a Mazda RX-7 entered by Mazda Australia.

== Class structure ==
The field was divided into six classes:

=== Class A ===
Class A : Touring Cars Under 1800cc - featured a battle between Toyota Corolla and smaller, lighter Suzuki Swift.

=== Class B ===
Class B : Touring Cars 1801- 2500cc - was made up of a variety of cars, Citroën BX, Hyundai Lantra, Mazda 323, Nissan Pintara and Nissan Pulsar

=== Class C ===
Class C : Touring Cars 2501-4000cc - a class intended for six cylinder Ford Falcon and Holden Commodore saw an influx of naturally aspirated sports cars, Honda NSX and Porsche 968 which were expected to be outright threats.

=== Class D ===
Class D : Touring Cars Over 4000cc - featured V8 powered Ford Falcon and Holden Commodore with the production car version of the Holden touring car expected to be fastest.

=== Class S ===
Class S : Sports Cars Under 2200cc - was dominated by Toyota MR2 but also contained Honda CRX and Nissan NX.

=== Class T ===
Class T : Turbo and 4WD Cars - mixed class featuring small turbos, Ford Laser, Hyundai Scoupe and Mitsubishi Lancer but also larger Mitsubishi Galant and Subaru Liberty but was largely dominated by larger sports cars, Lotus Esprit, Nissan Skyline GT-R, Toyota Supra and in particular the factory supported team of Mazda RX-7s.

== Results ==
Results of the event are given below.

Position	Drivers	No.	Car	Entrant	Class	Laps
1	Alan Jones; Garry Waldon	7	Mazda RX-7	Mazda Australia	T	263
2	Charlie O'Brien; Gregg Hansford	1	Mazda RX-7	Mazda Australia	T	261
3	Ian Palmer; Wayne Gardner; Ross Palmer	8	Honda NSX	Palmer Tube Mills	C	253
4	Graham Neilsen; Keith Carling; Bill Gillespie	3	Nissan Skyline GT-R	Falken Tyres	T	247
5	Kent Youlden; Brett Youlden; Chris Muscat	25	Ford EB Falcon XR6	Kent Youlden	C	245
6	Juan Manuel Fangio II; Peter McKay; Rick Bates	2	Toyota MR2	Neal Bates Motorsport	S	245
7	John Trimbole; Rohan Cooke; David Grose	41	Mitsubishi Lancer GSR	Daily Planet Racing	T	242
8	Tony Scott; Peter Brock	6	Holden VP Commodore SS	Castle Hill Racing	D	242
9	Peter Whitaker; Calvin Gardner; Neal Bates	20	Toyota MR2	Peter Whitaker	S	240
10	James Baird; Andrew Solness; Ray Lintott	9	Ford EB Falcon XR8	James Baird	D	240
11	Kevin Burton; Peter Vorst; Keith McCulloch	50	Ford EB Falcon SS	Kevin Burton	C	239
12	Mark Brame; Henry Draper; Barry Devlin	56	Suzuki Swift GTi	Mark Brame	A	238
13	Robin Bennett; David Borg; Gary Merlino	32	Toyota MR2	Robin Bennett	S	238
14	Mark Williams; Darren Parmenter; Chris Madden	57	Ford Laser TX3 Turbo	Fourtech Performance	T	237
15	Harry Bargwanna; Chris Symonds; Trevor Symonds	34	Toyota Corolla	Larry King	A	237
16	Murray Carter; Damon Beck; Brian Wilshire	12	Nissan Pulsar SSS	Murray Carter Racing	B	236
17	Geoff Forshaw; Warren Rush; Phil Alexander	24	Ford Laser TX3 Turbo	Geoff Forshaw	T	235
18	David Sala; John Faulkner; Geoff Full	30	Toyota Corolla	David Sala	A	235
19	John Mathews; Rod Jones; Mick Newton	11	Mitsubishi Galant VR4	Ded. Micros Australia	T	234
20	Chris Walker; Andrew Wilson; Russell Becker	33	Mazda 323 Astina SP	Falken Tyres	B	234
21	Steven Richards; Paul Fordham; Melina Price	22	Nissan Pulsar SSS	Garry Rogers Motorsport	B	234
22	Glenn Jordan; Bill Harris	53	Suzuki Swift GTi	Glenn Jordan	A	233
23	Mark Ferrier; Phil Parsons; Neil Robson	28	Suzuki Swift GTi	Clark Australia	A	230
24	Colin Osborne; Keith Byrn; Tony Regan	51	Toyota Corolla	Colin Osborne	A	228
25	Terry Skene; Tim Grant; Kevin Heffernan	40	Holden VP Commodore SS	Spirit of Logan	C	227
26	Roland Hill; Jeff Edwards; Evert Harder	37	Holden VN Commodore S	Evert Harder	C	226
27	Danny Bogut; Fred Sayers; Warren Thompson	29	Suzuki Swift GTi	Autobarn Springvale	A	225
28	Bevan Purcell; John Lusty; Steven Pocock	36	Nissan Pintara TRX	Bevan Purcell	B	222
29	Danny Osborne; Barney Morris; Adam Kaplan	52	Toyota Corolla	Colin Osborne	A	221
30	Ron Masing; Peter Howard	26	Mitsubishi Lancer GSR	Ron Masing	T	216
31	Glenn Clark; Glen McIntyre; Terry Lewis	16	Citroën BX16	Peter McLeod	B	215
32	Mark Williamson; Ian Sawtell	58	Suzuki Swift GTi	Carrier Air Conditioning	A	215
33	John Bourke; Allan Grice	15	Toyota Supra	Hardie Iplex Pipe	T	214
34	Garry Rogers; Terry Sheil	21	Subaru Liberty RS Turbo	Garry Rogers Motorsport	T	211
35	Steve Vass; Trevor Hine; Phillip Johnson	54	Ford Laser TX3 Turbo	Steve Vass	T	207
36	Peter Janssen; Mark Craig; David Gittus	47	Nissan NX	Peter Janssen	S	207
37	Steve Hardman; David Stone; John Targett	10	Hyundai Lantra	Steve Hardman	B	205
38	Richard Wilson; Troy Nicholson; Darren Pate	43	Holden VN Commodore SS Group A SV	Richard Wilson	D	199
39	Bob Griffen; Geoff Fickling; Peter Taffa	38	Holden VP Commodore SS	Bob Griffen	C	199
DNF	Stephen Shedden; Jason Bargwanna; Scott Bargwanna	55	Toyota MR2	Fowler Bathroom Products	S	229
DNF	James Faneco; Alan Gough	35	Hyundai Scoupe	James Faneco	T	194
DNF	Peter McLeod; Peter Dane; Peter Janson	19	Citroën BX16	Peter McLeod	B	191
DNF	Darrell Dixon; Graham Lusty; Alan Letcher	42	Ford EA Falcon S	Darrell Dixon	C	191
DNF	George Santana; John Pollard	48	Honda CRX	Revolution Racegear	S	183
DNF	Larry Perkins; Ron Barnacle	18	Lotus Esprit S4	Team Sony Lotus	T	174
DNF	Chris Clearihan; Jane Taylor; Chris Wiles	14	Citroën BX16	Peter McLeod	B	74
DNF	Craig Dare; Terry Finnigan; Brian Callaghan	27	Ford Laser TX3 Turbo	Craig Dare	T	54
DNF	Tom Watkinson; Garry Willmington; Michael Craig	49	Toyota Corolla	Tom Watkinson	A	30
DNF	Chris Sexton; Rod Dawson; Wayne Osborne	39	Ford EB Falcon S	Chistopher Sexton	C	13
DNF	Ray Ryan; Harry Dutton; Jim Runciman	23	Mitsubishi Lancer GSR	Ray Ryan	T	2
DNF	Dick Johnson; Cameron McConville; Steven Johnson	17	Ford Laser TX3 Turbo	Dick Johnson Racing	T	1
DSQ	John Smith; Kevin Waldock; Geoff Morgan	5	Porsche 968 CS	Quell Fire & Safety Equipment	C	263
DSQ	Peter Fitzgerald; Brett Peters; Nicholas Leutweiler	4	Porsche 968 CS	Hardie Dux	C	263
DNS	Iain Thomson; L. Renato; Phil Showers	59	Mitsubishi Lancer GSR	Iain Thomson	T	-

== Statistics ==
- Attendance: 14,000
- Pole Position - #18 Larry Perkins - 2:32.89
- Fastest Lap - #18 Larry Perkins - 2:31.77 (147.37 km/h)
- Race time of winning car: 12h 00m 24.58s
- Distance covered by winning car: 263 laps, 1634.02 km
- Winners' Average Speed - 136.09 km/h
