= Bathurst 12 Hour =

Annual automobile race in Bathurst, NSW, Australia

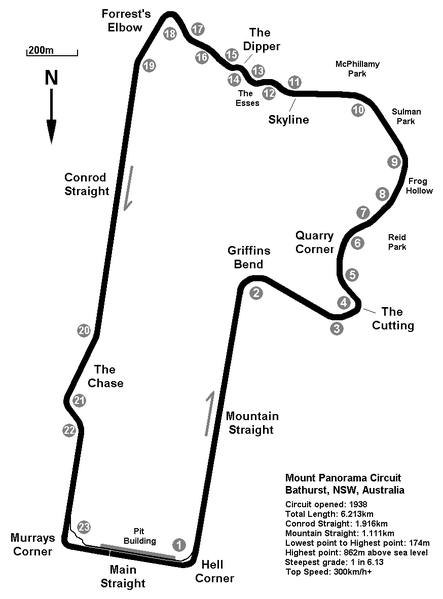

Intercontinental GT Challenge
- Venue: Mount Panorama Circuit
- Corporate sponsor: Meguiar's
- First race: 1991
- First IGTC race: 2016
- Last race: 2026
- Duration: 12 Hours
- Most wins (driver): John Bowe (3); Jules Gounon (3)
- Most wins (manufacturer): Mazda; Mercedes-AMG (4)

The Bathurst 12 Hour, currently known as the Meguiar's Bathurst 12 Hour for sponsorship reasons, is an annual endurance race for GT and production cars held at the Mount Panorama Circuit, in Bathurst, Australia. The race was first held in 1991 for Series Production cars and moved to Sydney's Eastern Creek Raceway in 1995 before being discontinued. The race was revived in 2007, again for production cars, before adding a new class for GT3 and other GT cars in 2011. This has led to unprecedented domestic and international exposure for the event. In all, twenty one races have taken place; twenty at Mount Panorama and one at Eastern Creek Raceway (Sydney Motorsport Park).

== Background ==
The event was inspired by the long-running Bathurst 500 production car race, which began at the Phillip Island Grand Prix Circuit in Victoria in 1960 (before moving to Bathurst in 1963) as a race for standard production cars with minimal modifications. In 1973 when the race was lengthened from 500 miles to 1000 kilometres, the regulations for cars entering the race changed from standard "series production" cars to improved touring cars. The Bathurst 12 Hour was intended to re-create the original feel of the Bathurst 1000, while providing a unique test in the longer race distance, rather than replicating the 1000 kilometre event.

== History ==
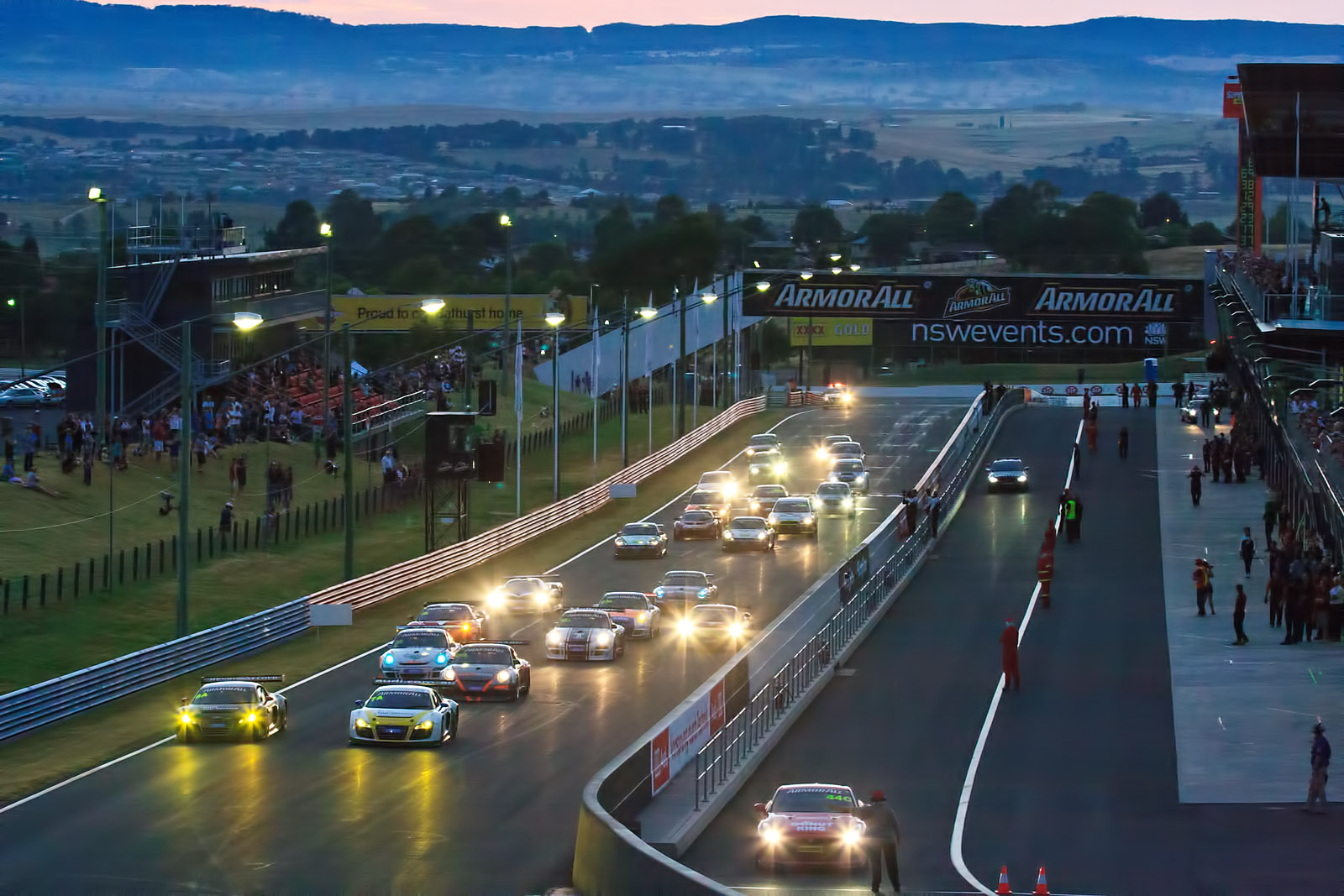
The start of the 2011 race.

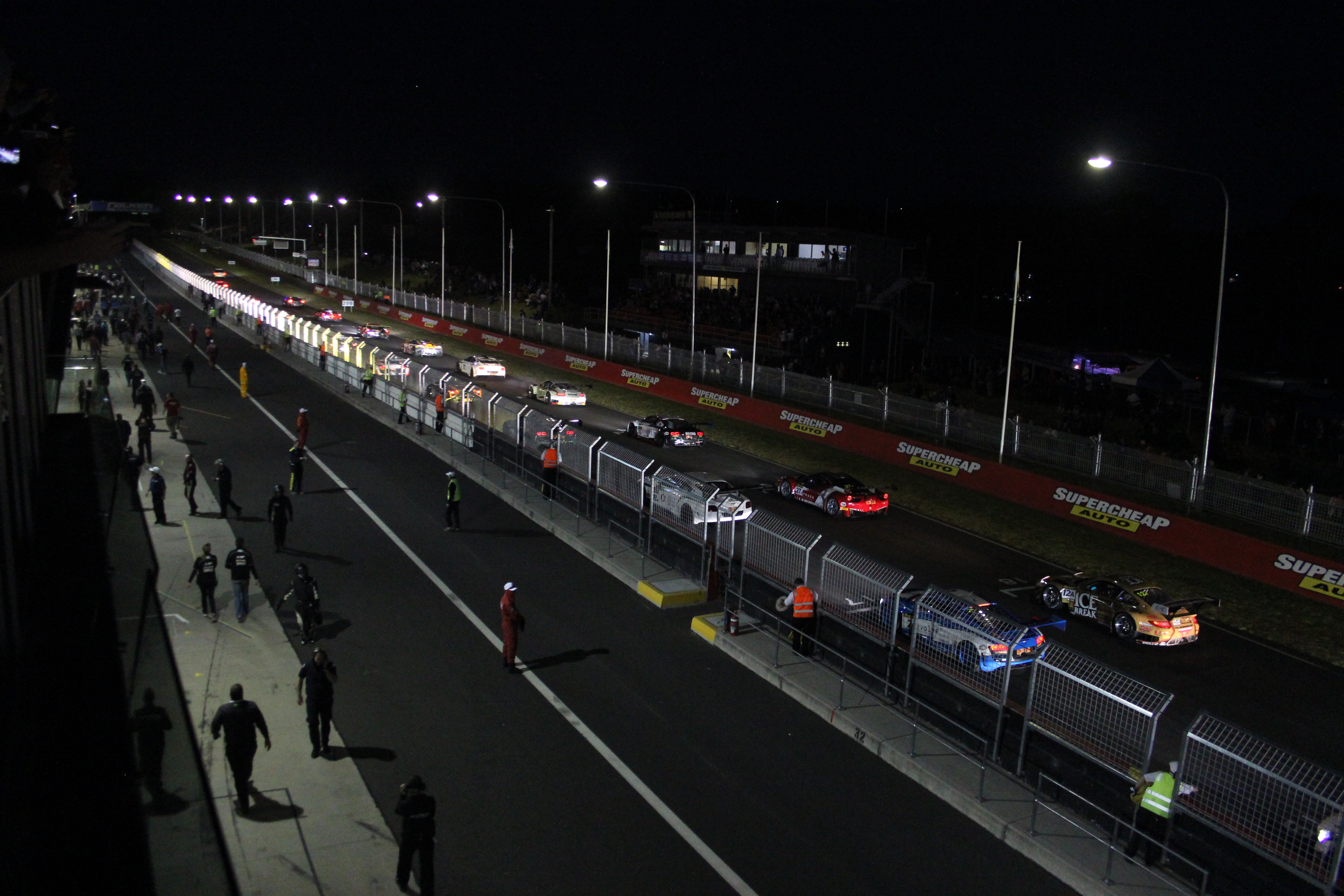
Cars on the grid prior to the start of the 2015 race.

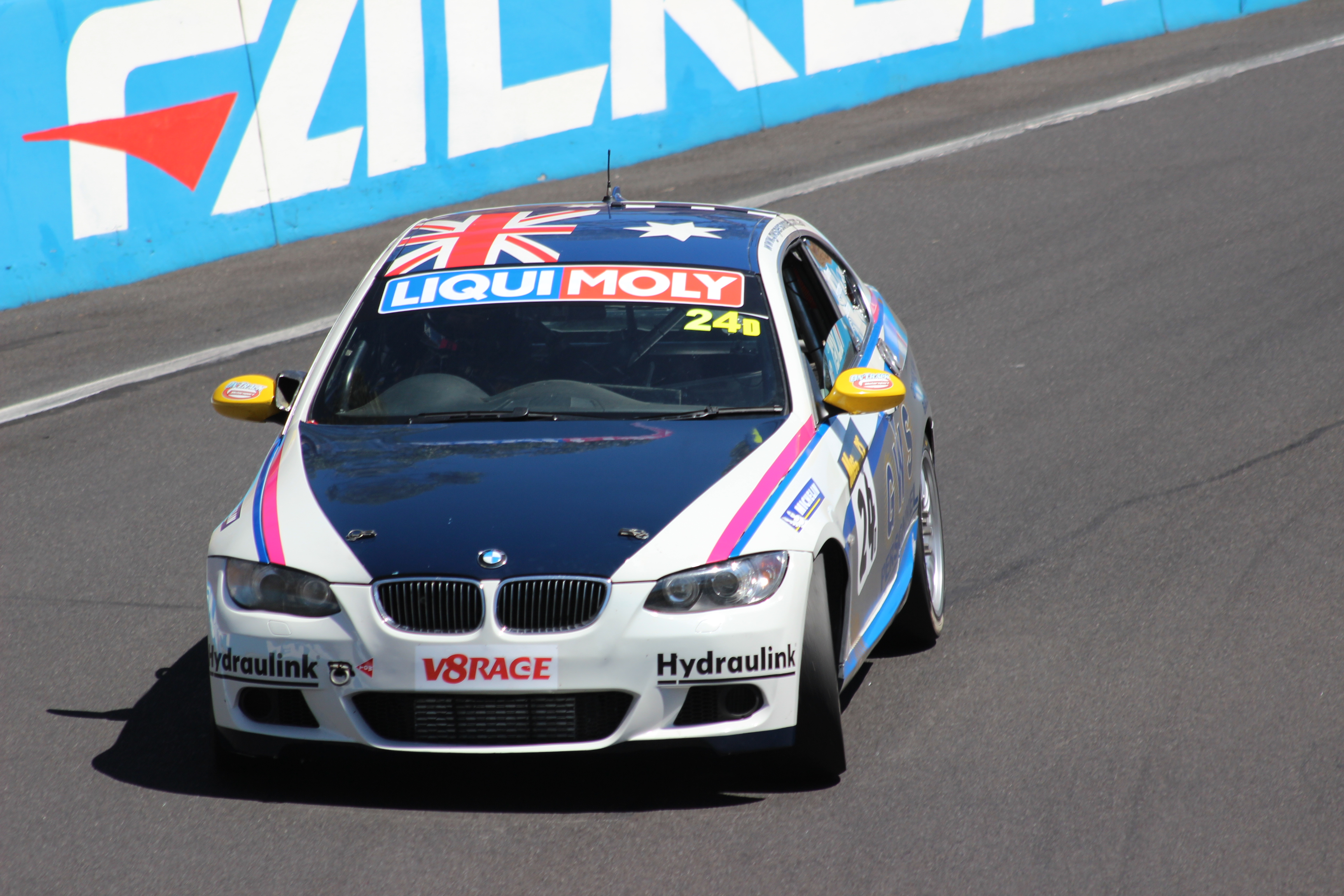
The BMW 335i which won the race in 2007 and 2010, pictured in 2013.

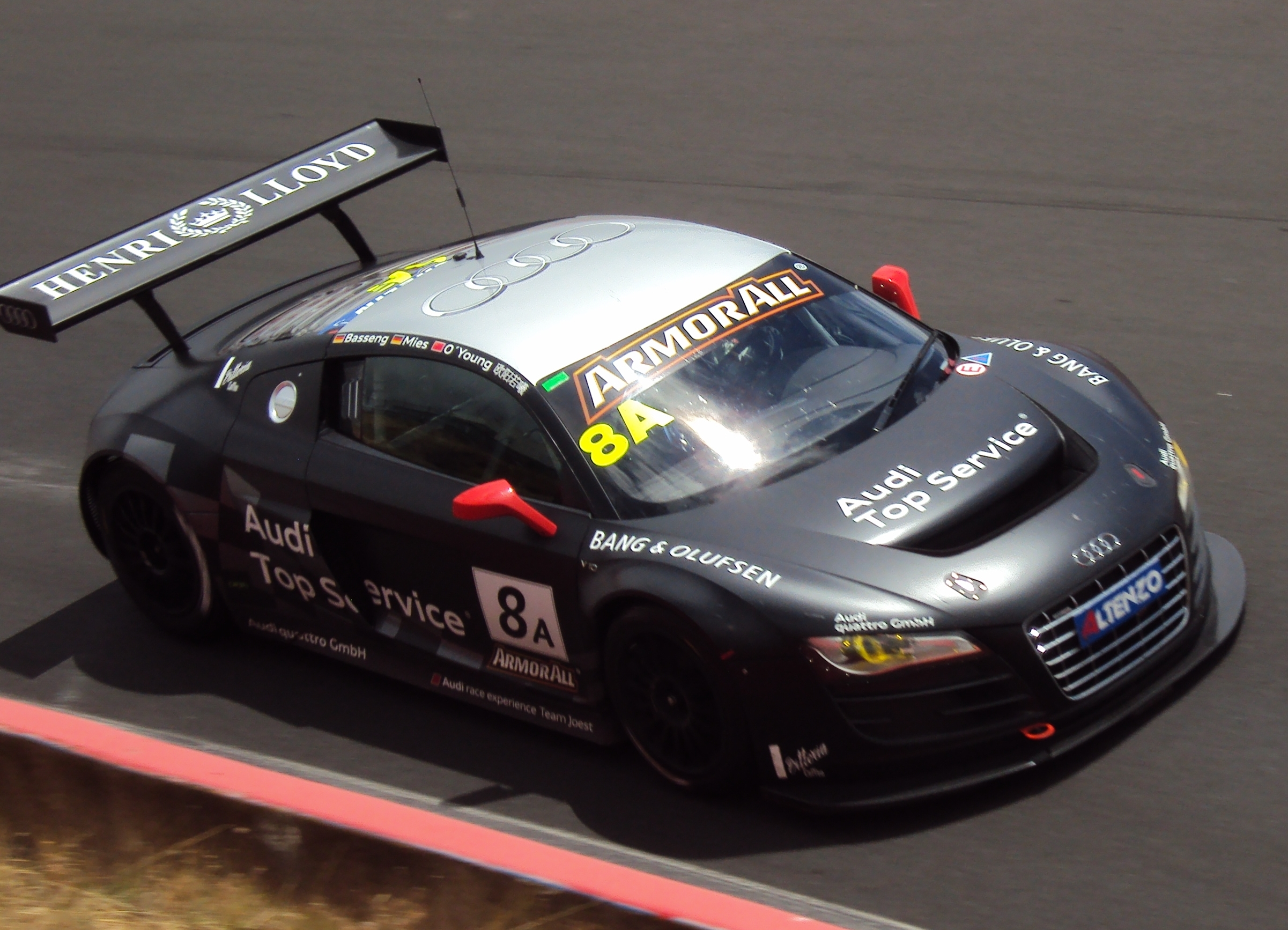
The Audi R8 LMS GT3 which won the 2011 race, the first to include GT3 entries.

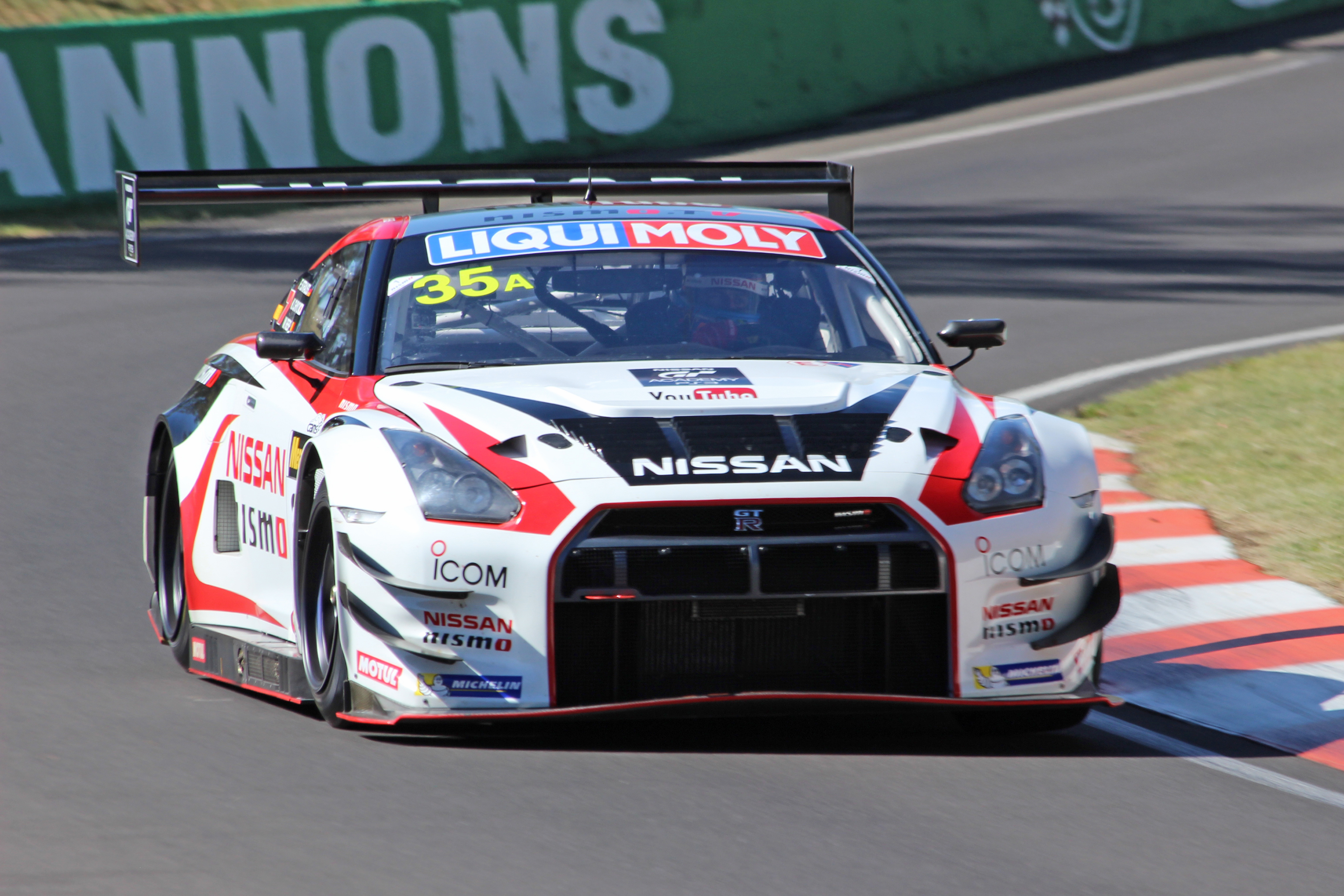
The Nissan GT-R NISMO GT3 which won the 2015 race.

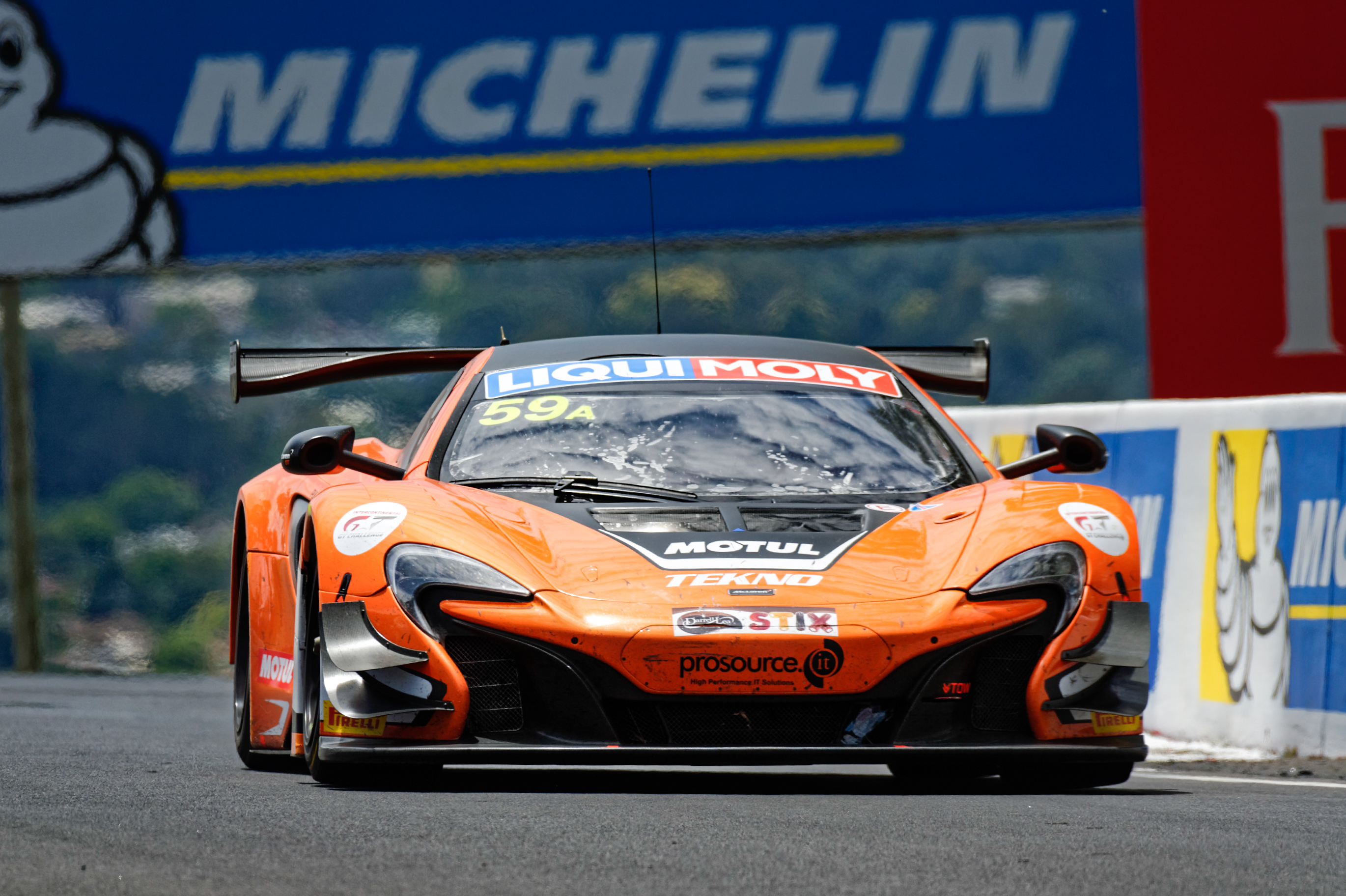
The McLaren 650S GT3 which won the 2016 race and held the circuit record from 2016 to 2018.

=== Production origins ===
In 1990, Vincent Tesoriero, a race promoter and former Bathurst 1000 competitor, looked at the decline of Group A touring cars in Australia and saw an opportunity to run a 12-hour endurance race for Series Production cars at Mount Panorama. Tesoriero secured long time Bathurst 1000 sponsor James Hardie as a sponsor for the event in late 1990, leaving limited time to launch and organise the event for the Easter weekend in 1991. The race regulations were based on the Group 3E Series Production Car rules then in use in the Australian Production Car Championship for naturally aspirated four- and six-cylinder passenger sedans, but also allowed turbocharged and V8-engined cars which had been outlawed from the Production Car Championship in 1990. Despite the short deadline, twenty-four cars were entered for the first race, spread over six different classes based on engine capacity and sporting specification. Exotic mid-engined sports cars and GT cars were not eligible to enter.

The race was originally scheduled to run from 9am to 9pm but this was disallowed by Bathurst Regional Council. The race would instead run from 5:15am to 5:15pm, with the final two hours televised by Network 10. Despite the event's length, the competitors proved extremely reliable, with twenty cars finishing the race. The race was won by Allan Grice, Peter Fitzgerald and Nigel Arkell racing Fitzgerald's 1989 Production Car Championship specification Toyota Supra.

In 1992, manufacturer-backed teams began to appear with large teams entered and funded by Mazda, Holden, Citroën and Peugeot. Porsche would also provide factory support from 1993 onwards. Honda, Nissan, Maserati, BMW and Lotus were also represented but not by factory-supported teams. The Mazda team would go on to dominate the event with the Mazda RX-7, winning the next three consecutive races at Mount Panorama.

Facing rising costs, the 1995 event was moved from Bathurst to Eastern Creek Raceway in Sydney, and from the Easter weekend to August, before the race was discontinued in 1996.

=== Hiatus ===
After no major race for production cars for a number of years, the concept was revived with the short-lived Bathurst 24 Hour races in 2002 and 2003. The races were run by Nations Cup owners PROCAR and were dominated by the Holden Monaro 427Cs of Garry Rogers Motorsport. The Bathurst 24 Hour only lasted two years before PROCAR owner Ross Palmer was forced to abandon the race due to rising costs.

=== Revival ===
The Bathurst 12 Hour was successfully revived in 2007 as part of the Bathurst Motorsport Festival While James O'Brien, who masterminded the return of the event, planned for GT cars to share the event with production cars, the return of the race began with regulations close to its original concept as a race for production cars. 32 cars were entered for the 2007 race, which was won by Garry Holt, Paul Morris and Craig Baird in a BMW 335i. The win was ten years after Morris and Baird had won the 1997 AMP Bathurst 1000 in a BMW only to later be disqualified for exceeding driver time regulations. The race proved a preview of this period of the race, which saw BMW and Mitsubishi as the main combatants. The 2007 Subaru entry of rally drivers Chris Atkinson, Dean Herridge and Cody Crocker would be the only other manufacturer to finish the race in the top two between 2007 and 2010.

The 2008 and 2009 races were won by Mitsubishi Lancers, with Rod Salmon and Damien White amongst both line-ups. The 2009 race was particularly dominated by Mitsubishi, with the marque finishing in the first four positions. Garry Holt would then repeat his 2007 victory in 2010, driving again with Morris and also with John Bowe. The race was interrupted for an hour after a tree fell across Conrod Straight. The number of entries grew over this production-based period, peaking at 48 in 2009, while the final race held strictly to production car regulations in 2010 attracted 42 entries. During this time, the event itself grew in stature each year, firmly entrenching itself as one of the biggest race meetings at the start of the domestic Australian racing season, along with the Adelaide 500 and the Australian Grand Prix.

=== International expansion ===
In 2011, GT3-specification cars were allowed into the 12 hour race for the first time. Despite this, the number of entries dropped dramatically as many of the production car teams, disillusioned by the move towards GT, decided not to race. Of the 26 cars that competed in 2011, just eight raced in the production car classes, compared with the 42 that made up the full 2010 field. The German-based Joest Racing dominated the 2011 event, with the team's two Audi R8 LMS GT3s finishing first and second, a lap ahead of the third-placed Porsche. 2012 saw another small field of just 25 cars. Audi won the race for the second consecutive year, this time with DTM and FIA GT1 team Phoenix Racing.

The 2013 event ended the two-year run of poor entry numbers, with a record field of over 50 cars. Another first for the event saw the opening round of the 2013 Australian GT Championship incorporated into the first hour of the race. The results of the GT Championship round were based on the positions of the cars that had elected to race for GT Championship points at the end of the first hour of racing. Teams could then either continue on and complete the full race, or withdraw their car after the first hour. Drivers were allowed to cross-enter between cars so that they could race one car in the one-hour GT Championship race and then drive another car that was entered for the full 12 hours. Erebus Motorsport took the first win for an Australian team under the GT regulations with German drivers Bernd Schneider, Thomas Jäger and Alexander Roloff taking their Mercedes-Benz SLS AMG to victory.

Maranello Motorsport took a poignant win in the 2014 event—the team's former driver Allan Simonsen was killed in a crash at the 2013 24 Hours of Le Mans—with V8 Supercar driver Craig Lowndes holding off a late charge from German driver Maximilian Buhk to take victory. 2014 also saw the introduction of the Allan Simonsen Pole Position Trophy, named in honour of Simonsen, to be awarded to the fastest car in qualifying. The 2015 race featured a record twenty safety car periods, the last coming just minutes from the end of the race. Katsumasa Chiyo, driving a Nissan GT-R, took the lead with two laps remaining to give Nissan its first major victory at Mount Panorama since the 1992 Bathurst 1000.

In August 2015, the V8 Supercars-owned company Supercars Events purchased 50% of the Bathurst 12 Hour, joining existing part-owners Bathurst Regional Council. This followed a date clash between the 2015 12 Hour and V8 Supercars' 2015 pre-season test day which saw V8 Supercar drivers, such as 2014 12 Hour-winner Lowndes, forced to take part in the test day and be unable to race in the 12 Hour. With an increasing focus on the outright GT3 cars and a dwindling number of production cars in the race, the former organisers of the 12 Hour, Yeehah Events, announced the production car-based Bathurst 6 Hour for 2016, to restore a Bathurst endurance race for the production category. The 6 Hour is now part of the Bathurst Motor Festival at Easter.

=== Intercontinental GT Challenge ===
The 2016 race was the inaugural race of the newly formed Intercontinental GT Challenge, which in its first year also included the Sepang 12 Hours and Spa 24 Hours and is managed by the Stéphane Ratel Organisation. The event itself saw record pace from Shane van Gisbergen in qualifying and the race to lead his Tekno Autosports McLaren 650S GT3 to victory alongside McLaren factory driver Álvaro Parente and Tekno team owner/driver Jonathon Webb. The 2017 event saw the introduction of an all-pro GT3 class for the first time, with the race receiving 55 entries, the highest in the event's revival. In the race itself, Maranello Motorsport repeated their 2014 triumph, with Finnish driver Toni Vilander teaming up with Lowndes and Jamie Whincup to receive the Australian Tourist Trophy, which became the perpetual trophy for the outright winner.

The 2018 race finished before the twelve hour duration due to a major crash at Sulman Park involving Ash Walsh, Bryce Fullwood and John Martin which saw Walsh and Martin transported to hospital. This meant that the Audi Sport Team WRT entry of Robin Frijns, Stuart Leonard and Dries Vanthoor took the flag, despite doubts over whether they had the fuel to win the race if there was no disruption. In 2019, the race had unprecedented amounts of green flag running leading to a distance record being set. After dropping from first to fourth in the final pit-stop phase, Matt Campbell completed three overtakes, including one on Chaz Mostert that required a post-race investigation, to take Porsche's first victory in the race alongside Dennis Olsen and Dirk Werner. The 2020 race again broke the distance record with Bentley taking their first victory in the event in six attempts. The field was reduced by five cars prior to the race with several heavy crashes in practice and qualifying.

=== Impact of COVID-19 ===
In October 2020, the 2021 race was cancelled, predominantly due to the international travel restrictions caused by the COVID-19 pandemic in Australia. Supercars, part-owners of the event, instead ran the Mount Panorama 500 in February as the opening round of the 2021 Supercars Championship. After further COVID-19 concerns, the 2022 race was delayed from February to May. The 2022 event also featured several major regulation changes, including the removal of the all-professional class for the first time since 2016. Twenty cars entered the race, which featured extended pre-dawn running, cooler temperatures and rolling fog due to the autumn date, plus intermittent rain throughout the day. Having finished second in 2018, Kenny Habul, who owns a property on Conrod Straight, led his SunEnergy1 Racing team to victory. The driver line-up included Jules Gounon who won the event in consecutive runnings, having been part of the Bentley line-up in 2020.

== Winners ==
Events which were not held at Mount Panorama Circuit are indicated by a pink background.

Year	Drivers	Vehicle	Entrant	Laps	Distance
1991	(New Zealand) Nigel Arkell (Australia) Peter Fitzgerald (Australia) Allan Grice	Toyota Supra Turbo	(Australia) Fitzgerald Racing	242	1503.546 km
1992	(Australia) Mark Gibbs (Australia) Charlie O'Brien (Australia) Garry Waldon	Mazda RX-7	Mazda Australia	254	1578.102 km
1993	(Australia) Alan Jones (Australia) Garry Waldon	Mazda RX-7	Mazda Australia	263	1634.019 km
1994	(Australia) Neil Crompton (Australia) Gregg Hansford	Mazda RX-7	(Australia) Mazda Motorsport	262	1627.806 km
1995^{1}	(Australia) John Bowe (Australia) Dick Johnson	Mazda RX-7	(Australia) Mazda Motorsport	409	1607.370 km
1996 – 2006	Not held See also: Bathurst 24 Hour (2002–2003)				
2007	(New Zealand) Craig Baird (Australia) Garry Holt (Australia) Paul Morris	BMW 335i	(Australia) Eastern Creek Karts P/L	257	1596.741 km
2008	(Australia) Graham Alexander (Australia) Rod Salmon (Australia) Damien White	Mitsubishi Lancer Evo IX	(Australia) SKWIRK.com	253	1571.889 km
2009	(Australia) Tony Longhurst (Australia) Rod Salmon (Australia) Damien White	Mitsubishi Lancer Evo X	Team Mitsubishi Ralliart Australia	239	1484.907 km
2010	(Australia) John Bowe (Australia) Garry Holt (Australia) Paul Morris	BMW 335i	(Australia) Eastern Creek International Karting	202^{2}	1255.026 km
2011	(Germany) Marc Basseng (Germany) Christopher Mies (Hong Kong) Darryl O'Young	Audi R8 LMS GT3	(Germany) Joest Racing	292	1814.196 km
2012	(Hong Kong) Darryl O'Young (Germany) Christer Jöns (Germany) Christopher Mies	Audi R8 LMS GT3	(Germany) Phoenix Racing	270	1677.510 km
2013	(Germany) Thomas Jäger (Germany) Alexander Roloff (Germany) Bernd Schneider	Mercedes-Benz SLS AMG GT3	(Australia) Erebus Motorsport	268	1665.084 km
2014	(Australia) John Bowe (Australia) Peter Edwards (Australia) Craig Lowndes (Finland) Mika Salo	Ferrari 458 Italia GT3	(Australia) Maranello Motorsport	296	1839.048 km
2015	(Japan) Katsumasa Chiyo (Belgium) Wolfgang Reip (Germany) Florian Strauss	Nissan GT-R NISMO GT3	(Japan) NISMO Athlete Global Team	269	1671.297 km
2016	(Portugal) Álvaro Parente (New Zealand) Shane van Gisbergen (Australia) Jonathon Webb	McLaren 650S GT3	(Australia) Tekno Autosports	297	1845.261 km
2017	(Australia) Craig Lowndes (Australia) Jamie Whincup (Finland) Toni Vilander	Ferrari 488 GT3	(Australia) Maranello Motorsport	290	1801.770 km
2018	(Netherlands) Robin Frijns (United Kingdom) Stuart Leonard (Belgium) Dries Vanthoor	Audi R8 LMS GT3	(Belgium) Audi Sport Team WRT	271^{3}	1683.723 km
2019	(Germany) Dirk Werner (Norway) Dennis Olsen (Australia) Matt Campbell	Porsche 911 GT3 R	(New Zealand) Earl Bamber Motorsport	312	1938.456 km
2020	(France) Jules Gounon (South Africa) Jordan Pepper (Belgium) Maxime Soulet	Bentley Continental GT3	(United Kingdom) Bentley Team M-Sport	314	1950.882 km
2021	Not held due to Covid-19 Pandemic				
2022	(Australia) Kenny Habul (Austria) Martin Konrad (France) Jules Gounon (Germany) Luca Stolz	Mercedes-AMG GT3 Evo	(Australia) SunEnergy1 Triple Eight Race Engineering	291	1807.983 km
2023	(Australia) Kenny Habul (Andorra) Jules Gounon (Germany) Luca Stolz	Mercedes-AMG GT3 Evo	(Australia) SunEnergy1 AKKodis ASP Team	323^{4}	2006.799 km
2024	(Turkey) Ayhancan Güven (Belgium) Laurens Vanthoor (Australia) Matt Campbell	Porsche 911 GT3 R (992)	(Germany) Manthey EMA Motorsport	275	1708.575 km
2025	(Brazil) Augusto Farfus (South Africa) Kelvin van der Linde (South Africa) Sheldon van der Linde	BMW M4 GT3	(Belgium) Team WRT	306	1901.178 km
2026	(Germany) Maro Engel (Canada) Mikaël Grenier (Belgium) Maxime Martin	Mercedes-AMG GT3 Evo	(Hong Kong) Mercedes-AMG Team GMR	262^{5}	1627.806 km

Notes

^1 – The 1995 race was staged at Eastern Creek Raceway as the 1995 Eastern Creek 12 Hour.
^2 – The 2010 race was red flagged for approximately an hour after a tree fell across Conrod Straight and had to be removed.
^3 – The 2018 race was red flagged on lap 273 following a multi-car accident at Sulman Park at 5:25 PM, with twenty minutes remaining in the race. As the debris was unable to be cleared to allow the race to restart before the deadline of 5:43 PM (race regulations state the race starts at 5:45 AM and ends with one full completed lap once the leader crosses the finish line after 5:43 PM), the race results were backdated to lap 271 meaning that two of the three cars involved in the incident were classified.
^4 – Race record for laps & distance covered.
^5 – The 2026 race was red flagged for approximately 55 minutes after a collision at Forrest’s Elbow, resulting in a field of debris.

== Multiple winners (outright) ==
=== By driver ===
Wins	Driver	Years
3	(Australia) John Bowe	1995, 2010, 2014
3	(France) Jules Gounon	2020, 2022, 2023
2	(Australia) Garry Waldon	1992, 1993
2	(Australia) Rod Salmon	2008, 2009
2	(Australia) Damien White	2008, 2009
2	(Australia) Garry Holt	2007, 2010
2	(Australia) Paul Morris	2007, 2010
2	(Germany) Christopher Mies	2011, 2012
2	(Hong Kong) Darryl O'Young	2011, 2012
2	(Australia) Craig Lowndes	2014, 2017
2	(Australia) Matt Campbell	2019, 2024
2	(Australia) Kenny Habul	2022, 2023
2	(Germany) Luca Stolz	2022, 2023

=== By manufacturer ===
Wins	Manufacturer	Years
4	(Japan) Mazda	1992, 1993, 1994, 1995
4	(Germany) Mercedes-AMG	2013, 2022, 2023, 2026
3	(Germany) Audi	2011, 2012, 2018
3	(Germany) BMW	2007, 2010, 2025
2	(Japan) Mitsubishi	2008, 2009
2	(Italy) Ferrari	2014, 2017
2	(Germany) Porsche	2019, 2024

== Allan Simonsen Pole Position Trophy ==
In 2014, a trophy was introduced for the fastest time in qualifying, named after Allan Simonsen who died at the 2013 24 Hours of Le Mans. Simonsen, who had raced several times in Australia as part of a long and varied career, held the Bathurst 12 Hour race lap record at the time, as well as driving the fastest officially timed lap around Mount Panorama in a closed-wheel car. The introduction of the trophy coincided with the relaxing of qualifying restrictions from previous years, with the removal of the minimum allowed lap time (two minutes and six seconds), therefore allowing a major improvement in qualifying times. Despite the name, the trophy is given to the fastest qualifying time, not the car that starts on pole position in the case of a grid penalty, as initially occurred in 2019.

In 2014, Simonsen's former team at the 12 Hour, Maranello Motorsport, narrowly missed pole to Maro Engel by less than a tenth of a second. Maranello went on to win the race itself. In 2015, Laurens Vanthoor set the fastest ever officially recorded time of Mount Panorama in qualifying. This time was only to last twelve months, with Shane van Gisbergen beating the time by over one second in qualifying for the 2016 race. In 2017 a top ten shootout was introduced, as per the Bathurst 1000, with the fastest time winning the trophy. In 2018, Chaz Mostert became the first Australian to take the trophy as well as making BMW the fifth manufacturer to win the trophy in the five years since its inception.

The 2019 battle for the trophy had several twists, with the Aston Martin V12 Vantage GT3 of Jake Dennis initially taking the trophy after setting the fastest time in the Top 10 Shootout, despite a two-place grid penalty that he had earlier received for pit-lane speeding. Later, the car was excluded from the Top 10 Shootout for a technical infringement, granting the trophy to the Mercedes-AMG GT3 of Raffaele Marciello. On the race's return in 2022 from a one-year hiatus, the one-lap shootout was replaced by two fifteen minute sessions due to concerns over low tyre temperature, the first for 6th to 10th and the second from 1st to 5th in the earlier qualifying session. Over the sessions, Chaz Mostert became the first driver to win the trophy for the second occasion, taking pole by the smallest margin in the race's history.

Year	Driver	Vehicle	Entrant	Lap Time
2014	(Germany) Maro Engel	Mercedes-Benz SLS AMG GT3	(Australia) Erebus Motorsport	2:03.8586
2015	(Belgium) Laurens Vanthoor	Audi R8 LMS ultra	(Germany) Phoenix Racing	2:02.5521
2016	(New Zealand) Shane van Gisbergen	McLaren 650S GT3	(Australia) Tekno Autosports	2:01.2860
2017	(Finland) Toni Vilander	Ferrari 488 GT3	(Australia) Maranello Motorsport	2:02.8610
2018	(Australia) Chaz Mostert	BMW M6 GT3	(Germany) Schnitzer Motorsport	2:01.9340
2019	(Italy) Raffaele Marciello	Mercedes-AMG GT3	(Hong Kong) GruppeM Racing	2:02.9348
2020	(Australia) Matt Campbell	Porsche 911 GT3 R	(China) Absolute Racing	2:03.5554
2021	Not awarded			
2022	(Australia) Chaz Mostert	Audi R8 LMS Evo II	(Australia) Melbourne Performance Centre	2:02.4930
2023	(Germany) Maro Engel	Mercedes-AMG GT3 Evo	(Hong Kong) GruppeM Racing	2:00.8819
2024	(South Africa) Sheldon van der Linde	BMW M4 GT3	(Belgium) Team WRT	2:01.9810
2025	(Austria) Lucas Auer	Mercedes-AMG GT3 Evo	(Hong Kong) Mercedes-AMG Team Craft-Bamboo Racing	2:01.2760
2026	(Australia) Cam Waters	Mercedes-AMG GT3 Evo	(Australia) Scott Taylor Motorsport	2:01.0790

== Broadcasts ==
In the early days of the race in the 1990s, the race was broadcast on free-to-air television by Network Ten. On the race's return, the race was broadcast initially as a highlights package on SBS as well as being streamed online. In 2012, the event received its first live coverage since the 1990s, with pay television network Speed airing the final 90 minutes of the race, as well as producing a three-hour highlights package. Since the 2013 event, which was not broadcast live on television, commentary has been provided by Radio Show Limited who broadcast every session live on Radio Le Mans, building an international audience for the event. In 2014, RSL provided their commentary to SBS, who broadcast the final three hours of the race live on free-to-air. From 2015 onward, the entire race has been broadcast live on the Seven Network and 7mate, still in partnership with RSL, and has continued to be streamed online. In 2020 and 2022, pay television channel Fox Sports and its streaming service Kayo Sports broadcast the event in addition to 7mate.

The estimated viewing audience for the 2014 race was over half a million people from 150 countries.

== Event sponsors ==
- 1991–94: James Hardie
- 2007–09: Wright Patton Shakespeare (WPS)
- 2010–12: Armor All
- 2013–2020, 2022–2023: Liqui Moly
- 2024: Repco
- 2025~~--~~present : Meguiar's

== See also ==
- Bathurst 24 Hour
- Bathurst 1000
- Bathurst 6 Hour
