= 1995 Eastern Creek 12 Hour =

Endurance motor racing event

Seasons
- ← 1994 2007 →

Layout of the Eastern Creek Raceway

The 1995 Eastern Creek 12 Hour was an endurance race for GT Production Cars. The event was staged at Eastern Creek Raceway in New South Wales, Australia on 27 August 1995. It was the first and, to date, only 12 hour race to be held at that circuit.

The race was won by John Bowe and Dick Johnson driving a Mazda RX-7 SP.

== Classes ==
The field was divided into the following six classes:

- Class A : Small Cars - Up to 1850cc
- Class B : Medium Cars - 1851 to 2600cc
- Class S : Sports Cars - Up to 2000cc
- Class T : Turbo and/or 4WD High Performance Cars
- Class V : V8 Engines & High Performance 6 Cylinders
- Class X : Extra High Performance Cars

== Results ==
| Position | Drivers | No. | Car | Entrant | Class | Laps |
|---|---|---|---|---|---|---|
| 1 | John Bowe; Dick Johnson | 7 | Mazda RX-7 SP | Mazda Motorsport | X | 409 |
| 2 | Peter Fitzgerald; Jim Richards | 3 | Porsche 911 RSCS | Peter Fitzgerald | X | 409 |
| 3 | Andrew Miedecke; Mark Noske | 11 | Porsche 911 RSCS | Andrew Miedecke | X | 405 |
| 4 | Garry Waldon; Mark Skaife; Allan Grice | 9 | Mazda RX-7 SP | Mazda Motorsport | X | 404 |
| 5 | Greg Crick; Jack Brabham; Ross Palmer | 15 | Honda NSX | Ross Palmer Motorsport | X | 371 |
| 6 | Greg Hurst; Liz Hurst; Andrew Leithhead | 22 | Subaru Impreza WRX | Greg Hurst | T | 364 |
| 7 | Harry Bargwanna; David Simpson; Chris Symonds | 97 | Nissan Pulsar SSS | Larry King | B | 363 |
| 8 | Darren Palmer; Mark Brame | 40 | Suzuki Swift GTi | Mark Brame | A | 362 |
| 9 | Murray Carter; Ed Lamont; Graham Gulson | 45 | Mazda 626 | Murray Carter | B | 358 |
| 10 | John Bourke; David Morton | 20 | Subaru Impreza WRX | John Bourke | T | 357 |
| 11 | John Cowley; Tony Longhurst; Wayne Park | 19 | Ford EF Falcon XR6 | John Cowley | V | 356 |
| 12 | Andrej Pavicevic; Adam Clarke; Bill Harris | 43 | Suzuki Swift GTi | Bill Harris | A | 355 |
| 13 | Colin Osborne; David Sala; Steve Swaine | 13 | Toyota Corolla GTi | Colin Osborne | A | 351 |
| 14 | Paul Flottmann; Bill Sieders; Ian Green | 31 | Nissan Pulsar SSS | Paul Flottmann | B | 348 |
| 15 | Glenn Jordan; Paul Wilken | 41 | Suzuki Swift GTi | Glenn Jordan | A | 347 |
| 16 | Peter Brock; Tony Scott | 05 | Volvo 850 T-5R | Volvo 850 Racing | T | 344 |
| 17 | Ken Talbert; John Goss; Phil Kirkham | 34 | Mazda 626 | Ken Talbert | B | 272 |
| 18 | Kevin Burton; Peter Vorst; Howard Laughton | 17 | Ford EB Falcon SS | Kevin Burton | V | 265 |
| 19 | Win Percy; Ed Ordynski | 06 | Volvo 850 T-5R | Volvo 850 Racing | T | 254 |
| 20 | Neal Bates; John Ribeiro; Peter Dane | 29 | PRB Clubman | Rick Bates | S | 240 |
| 21 | Milton Leslight; Rodric Green; Brendon Cook | 16 | Peugeot 405 Mi16 | AAP Racing | B | 100 |
| DNF | Garry Smith; Nigel Stones; Glenn Mason | 14 | Toyota Corolla GTi | Garry Smith | A | 257 |
| DNF | Phil Alexander; Warren Rush; Rick Bates | 2 | Toyota MR2 | Rick Bates | S | 235 |
| DNF | Chris Wiles; Glenn Clark; Warren Luff | 98 | Ford Laser TX3 | Chris Wiles | A | 215 |
| DNF | Mark Larmour; Matthew Hunter; Phillip Scifleet | 37 | Suzuki Baleno | Mark Larmour | A | 153 |
| DNF | Peter McLeod; Ryan McLeod | 50 | Mazda RX-7 | Peter McLeod | X | 137 |
| DNF | Graham Blanch; Ric Shaw; Denis Rogers | 35 | Nissan Pulsar SSS | Mark Gibbs Racing | B | 134 |
| DNF | John Wright; Geoffrey Corah; Denis Cribbin | 27 | Citroën BX16 | Peter McLeod | B | 123 |
| DNF | Geoff Morgan; John Smith; Brad Jones | 4 | Porsche 911 RSCS | Geoff Morgan | X | 111 |
| DNF | Chris Kousparis; Anthony Wilson; Terry Shiel | 36 | Mazda 626 | Chris Kousparis | B | 106 |
| DNF | Terry Bosnjak; Alan Jones | 8 | Mazda RX-7 SP | Terry Bosnjak | X | 94 |
| DNF | Calvin Gardner; Tom Watkinson; Peter Hopwood | 28 | Toyota MR2 | Acme Photo Video | S | 89 |
| DNF | Kevin Ledger; Chris Smith; Richard Carter | 42 | Suzuki Swift GTi | Kevin Ledger | A | 76 |
| DNF | Ossie Newhouse; Barney Morris; William Cooke | 38 | Toyota Corolla GTi | Bradley Australia | A | 71 |

Italics indicate driver qualified but did not race
