= Geoff Morgan =

Australian HR executive and scout

Geoff Morgan AM
- Occupation: Businessman
- Board member of: McTavish Surf International; The Crescent Institute; World Scout Foundation; World Scout Committee

Geoff Morgan AM is an Australian businessman, known for co-founding Morgan & Banks with Andrew Banks.

== Career ==
Morgan co-founded Morgan & Banks, a recruitment agency with Andrew Banks in 1985. It became a public company in 1995. He joined Bank's Talent2 International in 2003.

== Scouting ==
Morgan has been a member of the World Scout Foundation, the World Organization of the Scout Movement's trust company, and has represented the foundation served on the World Scout Committee since 2021.

== Recognition ==
In 2015 Morgan was inducted into the Order of Australia. Together with Andrew Banks, was voted equal first in an industry poll of The 5 Most Influential People in the Recruitment Industry in the past 60 years.

In 2014, Morgan and Banks were inaugural inductees to the Recruitment International (Australia) Recruitment Industry Hall of Fame, for individuals who have made significant contribution to the Australian recruitment industry during their career.

In 2004, Morgan and Banks won the Ernst & Young Australia, Master Entrepreneur of the Year Award (Eastern Region) for sustained success in business.

== Books ==
- Flourish & Prosper (2005);
- Achieving Your Dream Career (2002);
- The Morgan and Banks Guide to: Getting That Job (1994);
- Going Up - How to Get, Keep and Advance Your Career (1988)
