= Audi A4 =

Luxury compact executive car

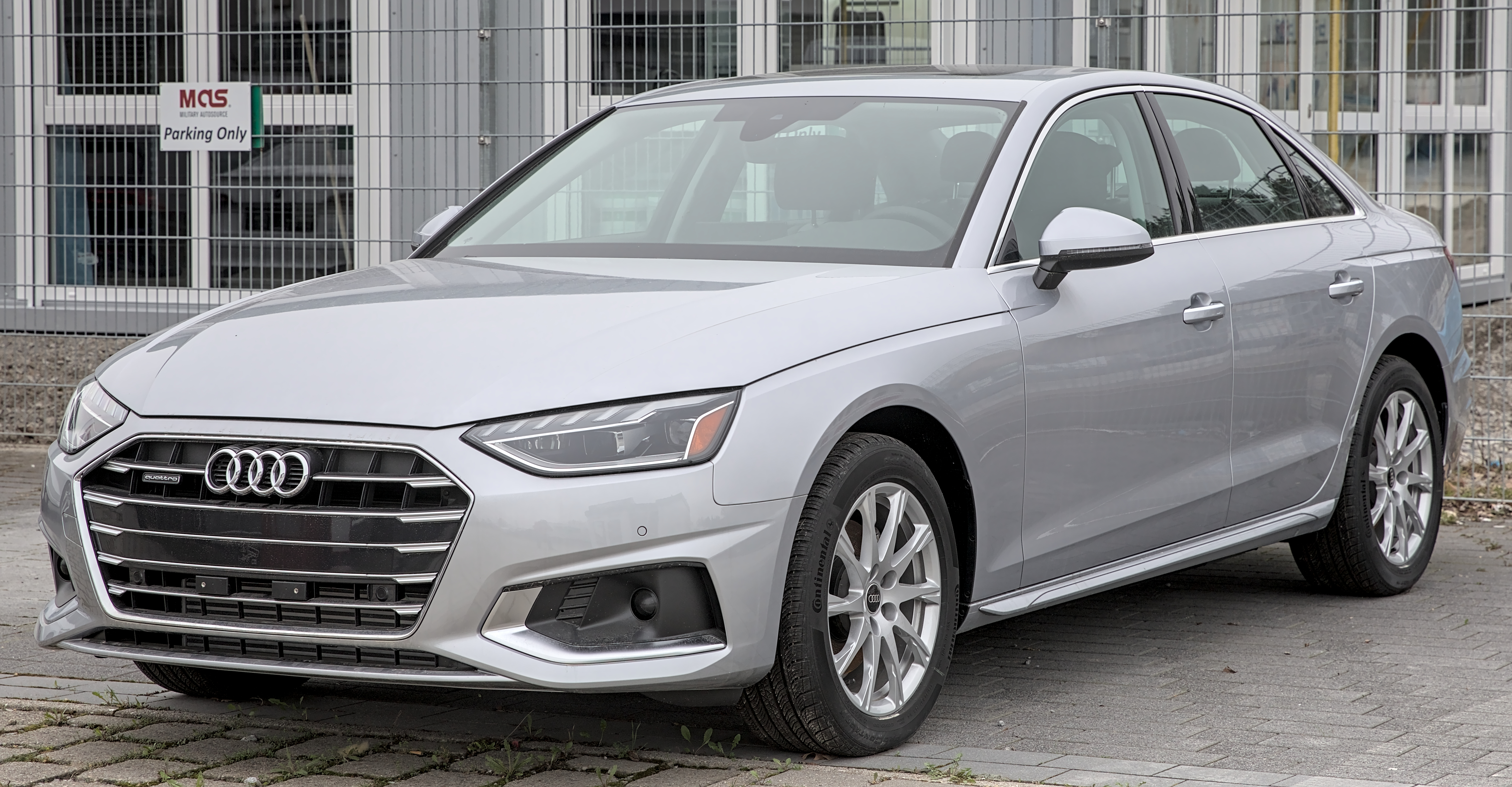
- Audi A4 (B9.5; facelift)

Overview
- Manufacturer: Audi AG
- Production: 1994–2025
- Assembly: Germany: Ingolstadt (1994–2025); China: Changchun (FAW-VW: 2003–2024); India: Aurangabad (Audi India: 2007–2024); Indonesia: Purwakarta (Garuda Mataram: B8 models only); Ukraine: Solomonovo (Eurocar: B7 models only)

Body and chassis
- Class: Compact executive car (D)
- Body style: 4-door Sedan; 5-door Avant; 2-door Cabrio (2002–2009)
- Layout: Front-engine, front-wheel-drive or quattro permanent four-wheel-drive
- Platform: Volkswagen Group B platform (1994–2008); Volkswagen Group MLB platform (2007–2024)

Chronology
- Predecessor: Audi 80
- Successor: Audi A5 (B10)

The Audi A4 is a line of luxury compact executive cars produced from 1994 to 2025 by the German car manufacturer Audi, a subsidiary of the Volkswagen Group. The A4 has been built in five generations and is based on the Volkswagen Group B platform. The first generation A4 succeeded the Audi 80. The automaker's internal numbering treats the A4 as a continuation of the Audi 80 lineage, with the initial A4 designated as the B5-series, followed by the B6, B7, B8, and the B9.

The B8 and B9 versions of the A4 are built on the Volkswagen Group MLB platform shared with several models and brands across the Volkswagen Group. The Audi A4 automobile layout consists of a front-engine design, with transaxle-type transmissions mounted at the rear of the engine. The cars are front-wheel drive, or on some models, "quattro" all-wheel drive. The A4 is available as a sedan and station wagon. Historically, the second (B6) and third generations (B7) of the A4 also included a convertible version. For the B8 and B9 versions, the convertible, along with a new coupé and 5-door liftback variant, was spun-off by Audi into a new nameplate called the Audi A5.

It has been manufactured in Ingolstadt since its beginning, in Changchun China by FAW-VW since 2003 and in Aurangabad India by Audi India since 2007.

The B9 generation A4 and A5 will be replaced by B10 version of A5, as part of Audi's new naming convention.

== B5 (Typ 8D; 1994) ==
First generation (B5/8D)
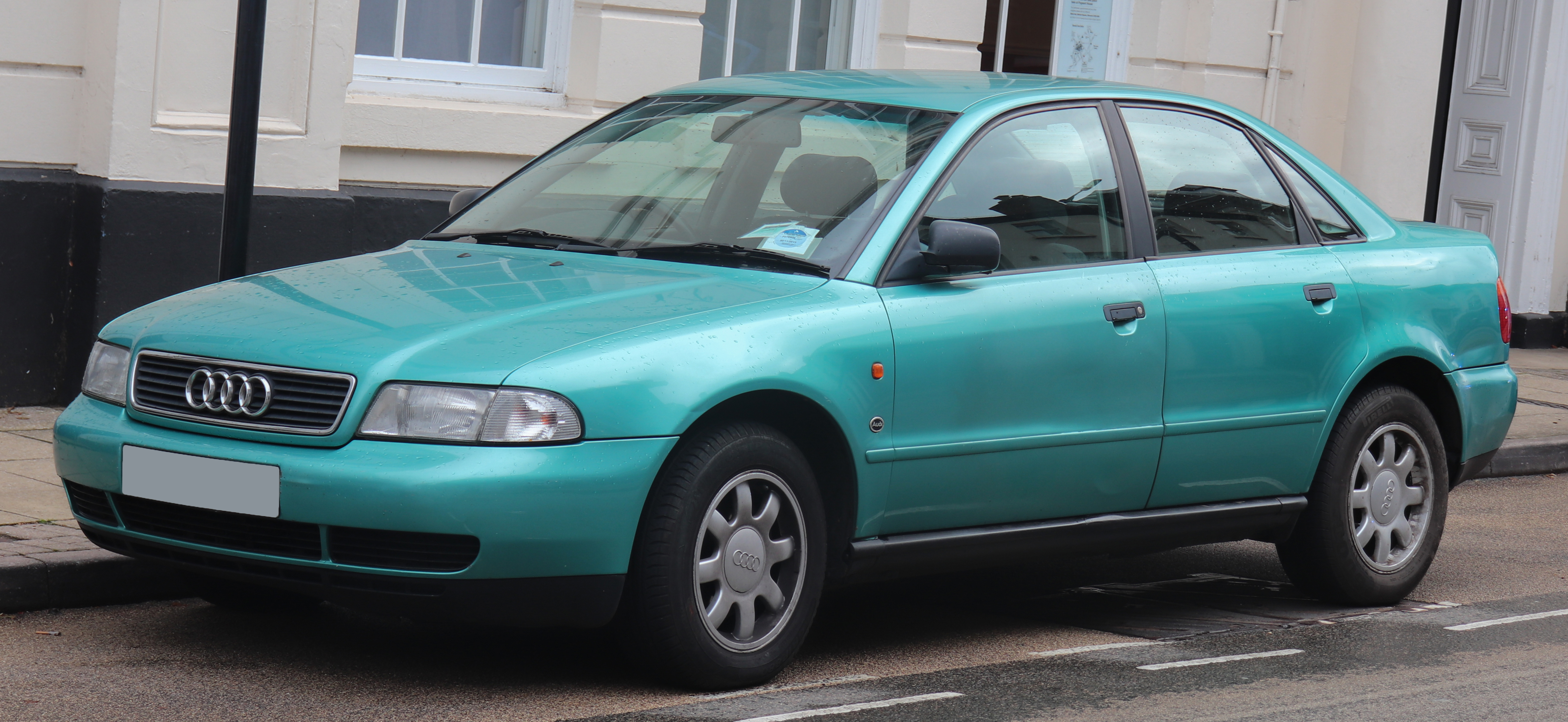
- 1996 Audi A4 SE 1.8 (pre-facelift)

Overview
- Production: 1994 – 2001; 1,674,943 built
- Designer: Imre Hasanić (1991); Jürgen Albamonte (1992)

Body and chassis
- Body style: 4 door saloon/sedan, 5-door Avant (estate/wagon)
- Platform: Volkswagen Group B5 (PL45) platform
- Related: Audi S4 (B5), Audi RS4 (B5), Škoda Superb, Volkswagen Passat (B5)

Powertrain
- Engine: Inline-four petrol engine: 1.6 L I4; 1.8 L 20v I4; 1.8 L 20v turbo I4; V6 petrol engine: 2.4 L 12v V6; 2.4 L 30v V6; 2.6 L V6; 2.7 L Biturbo V6; 2.8 L 12v V6; 2.8 L 30v V6; Inline-four diesel engine: 1.9 L DI I4; 1.9 L TDI I4; V6 diesel engine: 2.5 L 24v TDI V6
- Transmission: Manual transmission: 5-speed manual; 6-speed manual; Automatic transmission: 4-speed automatic; 5-speed ZF 5HP19 automatic

Dimensions
- Wheelbase: 2,615 mm (103.0 in)
- Length: 4,520 mm (178.0 in); Avant: 4,488 mm (176.7 in)
- Width: 1,733 mm (68.2 in)
- Height: 1,415 mm (55.7 in); Avant: 1,440 mm (56.7 in)

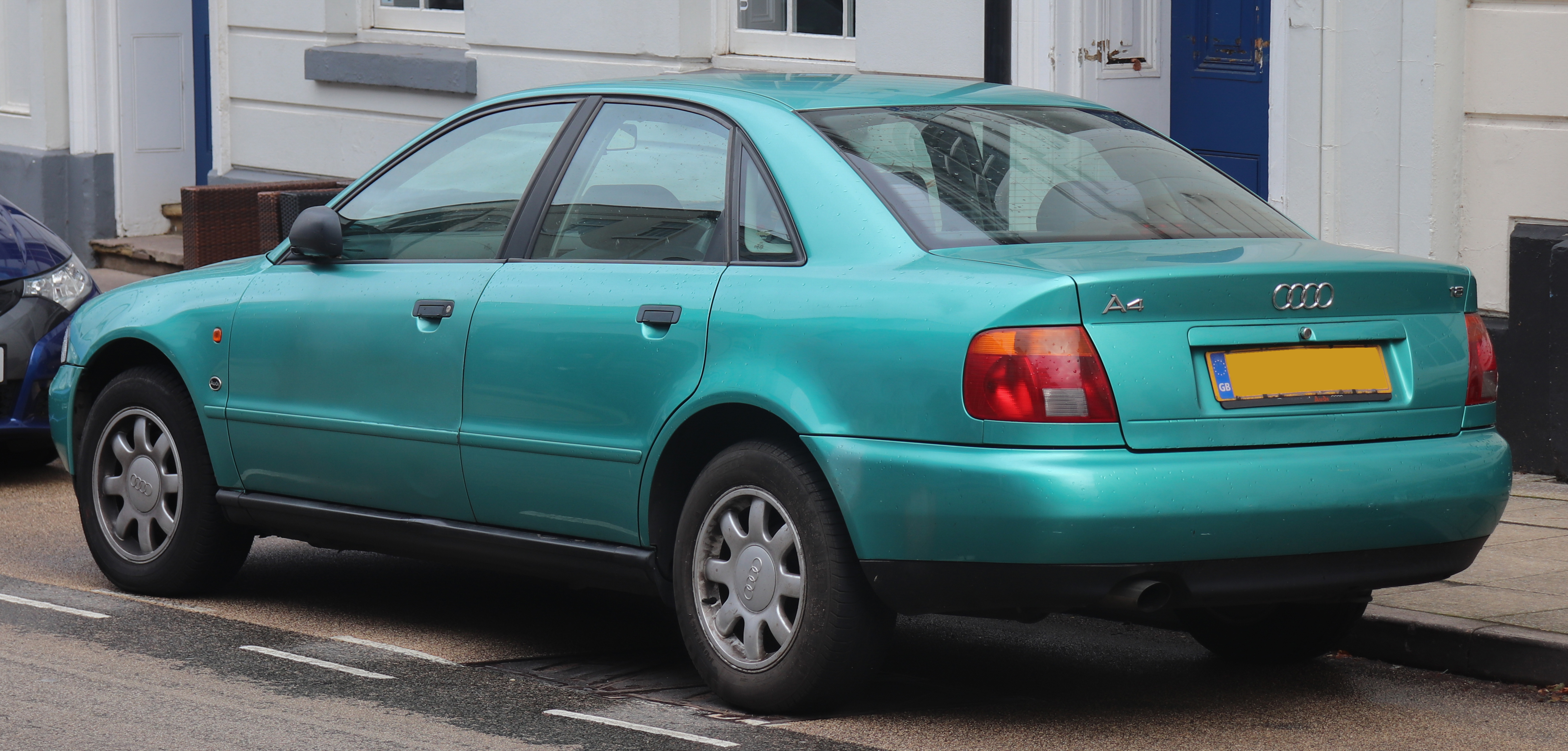
Sedan (pre-facelift)

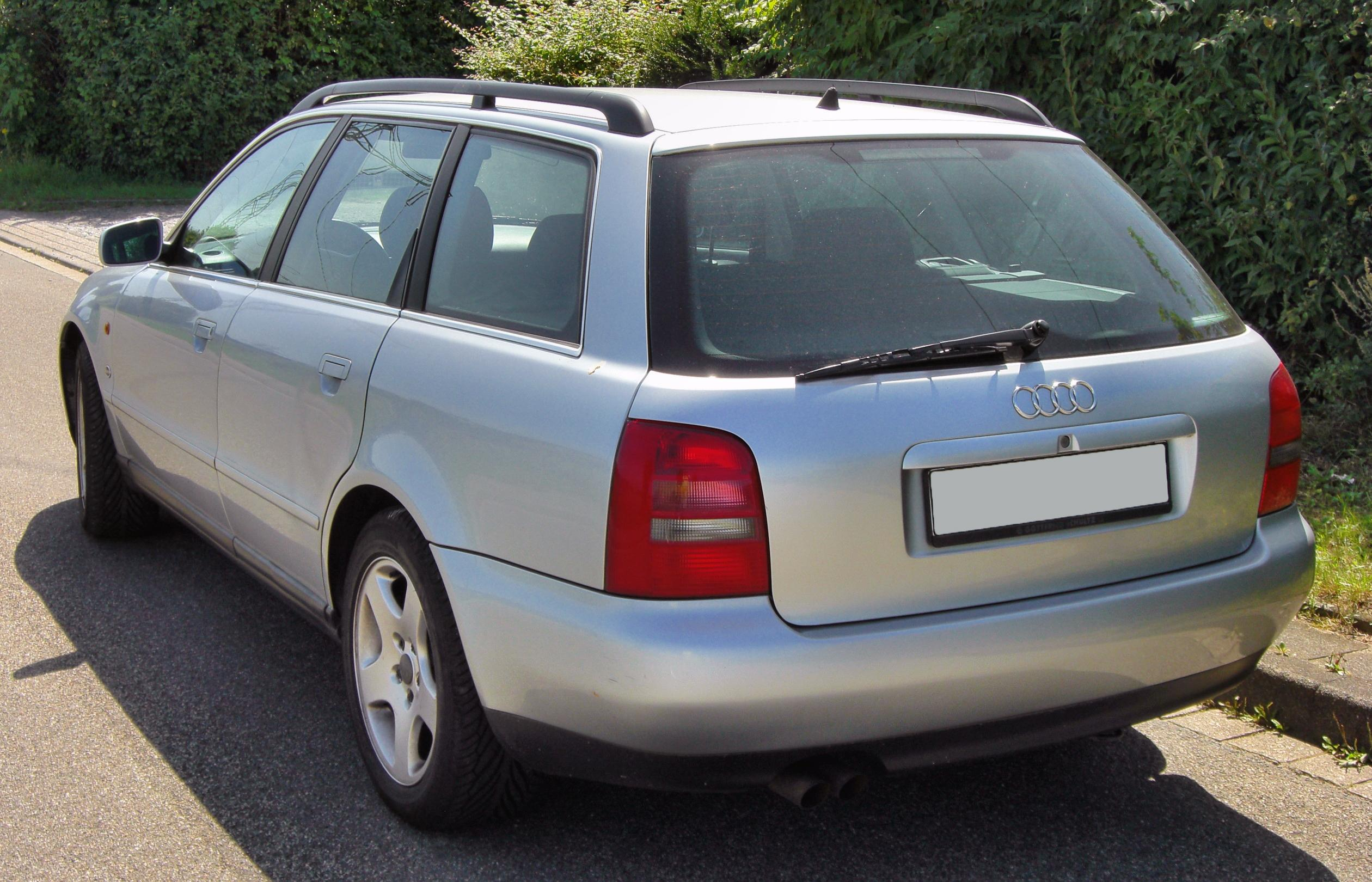
Avant (pre-facelift)

The first generation Audi A4 (known internally as the Typ 8D) debuted in October 1994, with production starting November 1994 and European sales commencing in January 1995 for the 1995 model year. North American sales later began in September 1995 for the 1996 model year. It was built on the Volkswagen Group B5 (PL45) platform, which it shared with the fourth generation Volkswagen Passat (B5, Typ 3B). It had a front-mounted longitudinal engine and front-wheel drive. Many variations of the A4 were also available with Audi's quattro four-wheel drive system. The A4 was initially introduced as a four-door saloon/sedan; the Avant (estate/wagon) was introduced in November 1995 and went on sale in February 1996.

Development began in 1988, with the first design sketches being created later that year. By 1991, an exterior design by Imre Hasanic was chosen and frozen for November 1994 production by 1992. The interior design was later finalized in 1992, with pilot production commencing in the first half of 1994. Development concluded in the third quarter of 1994, preceding November 1994 start of production.

A wide range of engines were available in European markets, between 1.6 and 2.8 litres for petrol engines; and a 1.9-litre diesel engine available with Volkswagen Group's VE technology, capable of achieving a 90 PS (66 kW; 89 bhp) or 110 PS (81 kW; 108 bhp). The 2.6 and 2.8-litre V6 engines which had been carried over from the old 80/90 proved popular, although in North America, the 2.8-litre engine was the only V6 that was available there until 1997. A 2.4-liter version was developed especially for the Thai market, where import duty jumped from 60 to 100 percent on cars of over 2,400 cc displacement.

The Audi A4 was the first model in the Volkswagen Group to feature the new 1.8-litre 20v engine with five valves per cylinder, based on the unit Audi Sport had developed. A turbocharged 1.8T version produced 150 PS (110 kW; 148 bhp) and 210 N⋅m (155 lb⋅ft) torque. Moreover, a quattro GmbH special edition of the B5 1.8T was later available in Germany and Europe, for which the engine's power output was raised to 180 PS (132 kW; 178 bhp) and 235 N⋅m (173 lb⋅ft). Five-valve technology was also added to a reengineered V6 family of engines in 1997, starting with the 2.8-litre V6 30v, which now produced 193 PS (142 kW; 190 bhp), followed by a 2.4-litre V6 which was a downsize from the previous 2.6 litre, 150 hp (112 kW) engine, but with a power increase to 165 PS (121 kW; 163 bhp).

Audi also debuted their new tiptronic automatic transmission on the B5 platform, based on the unit Porsche developed for their 964-generation 911. The transmission is a conventional automatic gearbox with a torque converter offering the driver a fully-automatic operation or manual selection of the gear ratios.

The B5 marked Audi's continued move into the midsize luxury car segment, having started this trajectory notably with later model years of the preceding Audi 80/90 B4. Despite initial mechanical problems, overall build and assembly quality were lauded both by the automotive press and within Audi and Volkswagen, and at the time, parent company Volkswagen declared the B5 the company-wide build quality benchmark for all its other models.

=== Facelift (1999–2001) ===
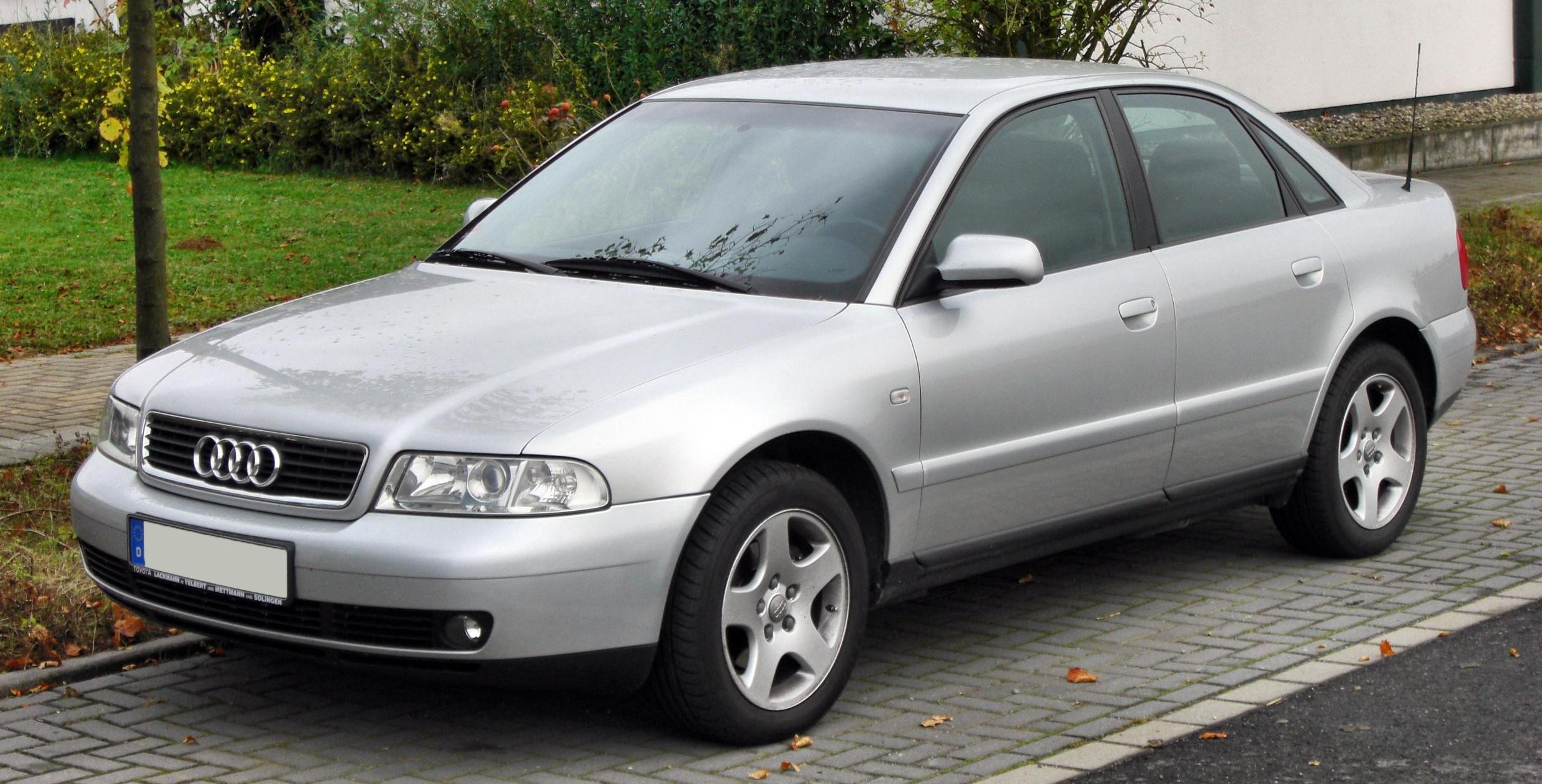

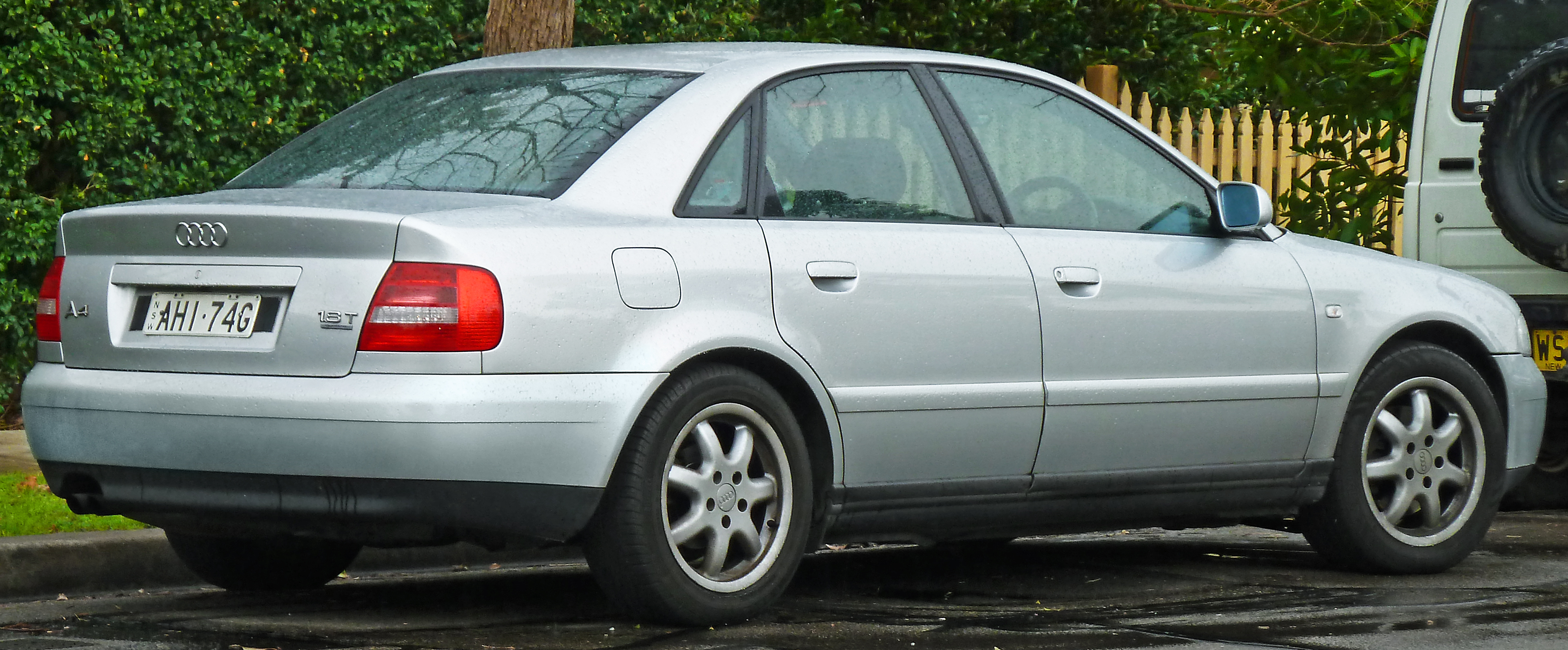
Sedan (facelift)

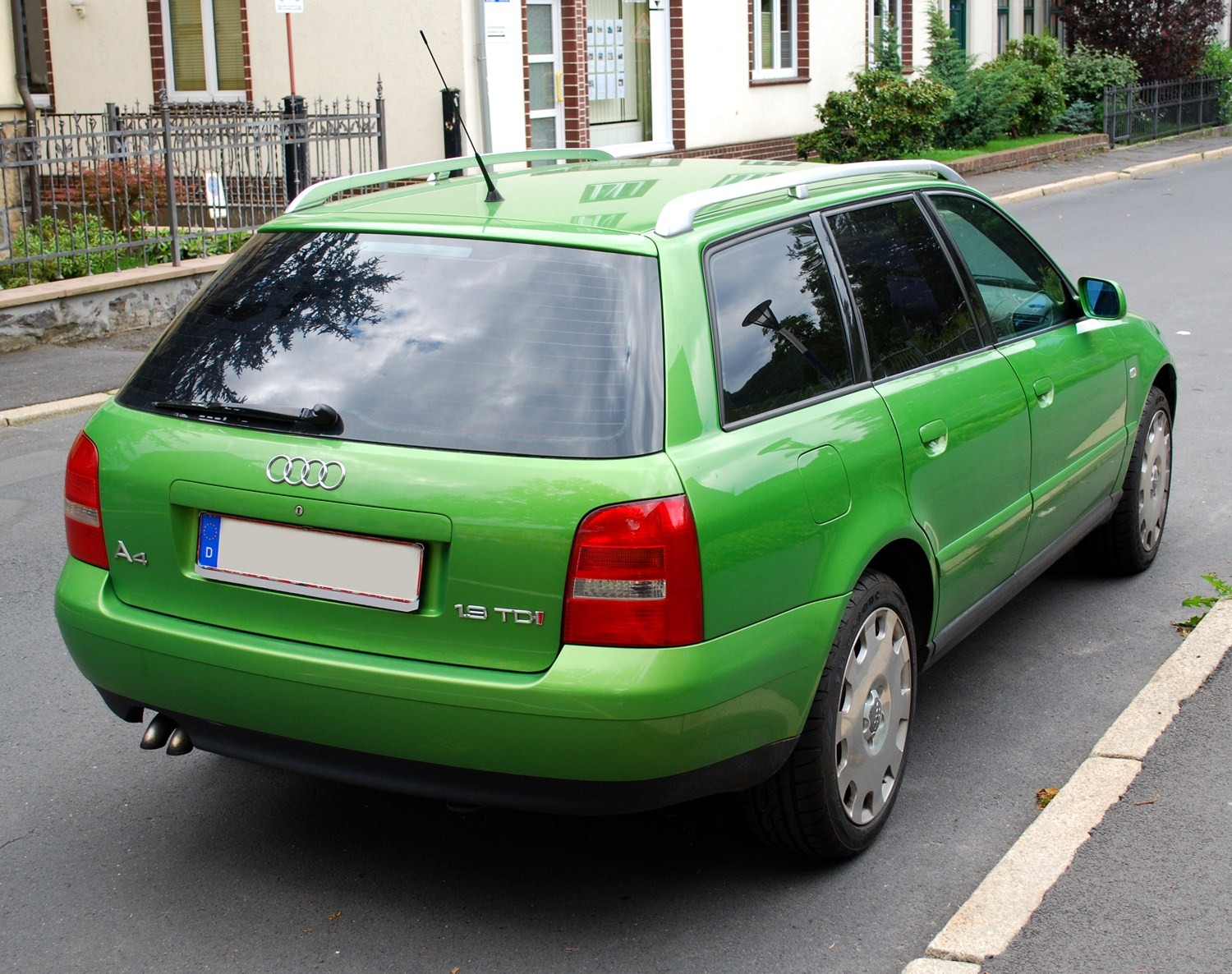
Avant (facelift)

The Audi A4 B5 saw nearly constant minor changes and alterations throughout its seven-year run. Moreover, a significant facelift was introduced for the 1998 B5 model year at the 1997 Frankfurt Motor Show, with sales beginning in Europe in early 1998. The 2.8-litre 30-valve V6 engine replaced the 2.8-litre 12-valve. A 2.5-litre V6 Turbocharged Direct Injection diesel engine with 150 PS (110 kW; 148 bhp) was standard on the Quattro. A six-speed manual gearbox was available, as well as the new high-performance Audi S4, now part of the A4 lineup (the previous S4 had been an Audi 100). Cosmetic updates included new rear lights, headlights, door handles, and another minor exterior/interior changes.

In mid-1998, the 1.8 20vT engine available outside Europe had its power output raised to 170 PS (125 kW; 168 bhp). The previous KKK K03 turbocharger, although fundamentally unchanged, received revisions on the turbine side to prevent cracking due to heat. The 12-valve V6 was replaced by the 30-valve unit which had been available in Europe for two years.

A further facelift took place across the A4 and S4 platform in February 1999 as a 1999.5 model; changes were largely cosmetic but affected many components, such as both front and rear bumpers, the front and rear lights, the center console, and door handles. While outer body shell changes from the pre-facelift model were superficially subtle, it meant that no two body panels were directly interchangeable between each other. This facelift was known at Audi as a Grosse Produktaufwertung (Major Product Upgrade), as was also signified by facelift cars now carrying the denomination "8D2".

In 1999 Audi also debuted an even higher performance RennSport model (rennsport translates as racing sport), the RS4 Avant, like its predecessor RS2, available only in the Avant bodystyle.

=== Engines ===
The following engines were available:

engine type	max. power	max. torque	top speed (saloon)	0–100 km/h (62 mph) (saloon) (manual)	years	CO_{2} emissions
petrol engines all fuel injected
1.6 I4 8v SOHC	101 PS (74 kW; 100 bhp)	140 N⋅m (103 lbf⋅ft)	191 km/h (119 mph)	11.9 s	1994–2001	174 g/km
1.6 I4 8v SOHC	102 PS (75 kW; 101 bhp)	148 N⋅m (109 lbf⋅ft)	191 km/h (119 mph)	11.9 s	2000–2001	192 g/km
1.8 I4 20v DOHC	125 PS (92 kW; 123 bhp)	173 N⋅m (128 lbf⋅ft)	205 km/h (127 mph)	10.5 s	1994–2001	182 g/km
1.8T I4 20v DOHC Turbo	150 PS (110 kW; 148 bhp)	210 N⋅m (155 lbf⋅ft)	222 km/h (138 mph)	8.3 s	1994–2001	182 g/km
1.8T I4 20v DOHC Turbo	180 PS (132 kW; 178 bhp)	235 N⋅m (173 lbf⋅ft)	233 km/h (145 mph)	7.9 s	1997–2001	194 g/km
2.4 V6 12v SOHC	150 PS (110 kW; 148 bhp)	207 N⋅m (153 lbf⋅ft)	220 km/h (137 mph)	9.1 s	1996–1997 (Only in Thailand, for tax reasons)	
2.4 V6 30v DOHC BDV Engine	165 PS (121 kW; 163 bhp)	230 N⋅m (170 lbf⋅ft)	225 km/h (140 mph)	8.4 s	1997–2001	226 g/km quattro: 247 g/km
2.6 V6 12v SOHC	150 PS (110 kW; 148 bhp)	225 N⋅m (166 lb⋅ft)	220 km/h (137 mph)	9.1 s	1994–1997, 1997–2000 (Indonesia)	
S4, 2.7 V6 30v Biturbo	265 PS (195 kW; 261 bhp)	400 N⋅m (295 lb⋅ft)	250 km/h (155 mph)	5.7 s	1997–2001	
RS4, 2.7 V6 30v Biturbo	380 PS (279 kW; 375 bhp)	440 N⋅m (325 lbf⋅ft)	262 km/h (163 mph)	4.9 s	1999–2001	288 g/km
2.8 V6 12v SOHC	174 PS (128 kW; 172 bhp)	245 N⋅m (181 lbf⋅ft)	230 km/h (143 mph)	8.2 s	1994–1997	
2.8 V6 30v DOHC	193 PS (142 kW; 190 bhp)	280 N⋅m (207 lbf⋅ft)	240 km/h (149 mph)	7.4 s	1997–2001	226 g/km quattro: 250 g/km
diesel engines all Direct Injection (DI)
1.9 TDI I4 8v SOHC	75 PS (55 kW; 74 bhp)	150 N⋅m (111 lbf⋅ft)	158 km/h (98 mph)		1996–2001	
1.9 TDI I4 8v SOHC	90 PS (66 kW; 89 bhp)	202 N⋅m (149 lbf⋅ft)	168 km/h (104 mph)	13.3 s	1994–1997	125 g/km
1.9 TDI I4 8v SOHC	90 PS (66 kW; 89 bhp)	210 N⋅m (155 lbf⋅ft)	168 km/h (104 mph)	13.3 s	1997–2001	143 g/km
1.9 TDI I4 8v SOHC	110 PS (81 kW; 108 bhp)	225 N⋅m (166 lbf⋅ft)	183 km/h (114 mph)	11.3 s	1994–1997	114 g/km
1.9 TDI I4 8v SOHC	110 PS (81 kW; 108 bhp)	235 N⋅m (173 lbf⋅ft)	183 km/h (114 mph)	11.3 s	1997–2000	114 g/km
1.9 TDI I4 8v SOHC PD	115 PS (85 kW; 113 bhp)	285 N⋅m (210 lbf⋅ft)	185 km/h (115 mph)	10.5 s	2000–2001	123 g/km
2.5 V6 TDI 24v DOHC	150 PS (110 kW; 148 bhp)	310 N⋅m (229 lbf⋅ft)	210 km/h (130 mph)	9.0 s	1997–2001	184 g/km

=== Safety ===
In the Euro NCAP safety and crash tests, the Audi B5 A4 received 3 stars for front- and side-impact protection, but the last star is flagged to indicate that the driver may be subjected to a high risk of chest injury in the side impact.

- Adult occupant =
- Pedestrian = (pre 2002 rating)

=== Derived hybrid version ===
In 1997, Audi was the first European car manufacturer to put a hybrid vehicle into mass production, the third generation Audi duo, then based on the A4 Avant.

== B6 (Typ 8E/8H; 2000) ==
Second generation (B6/8E/8H)
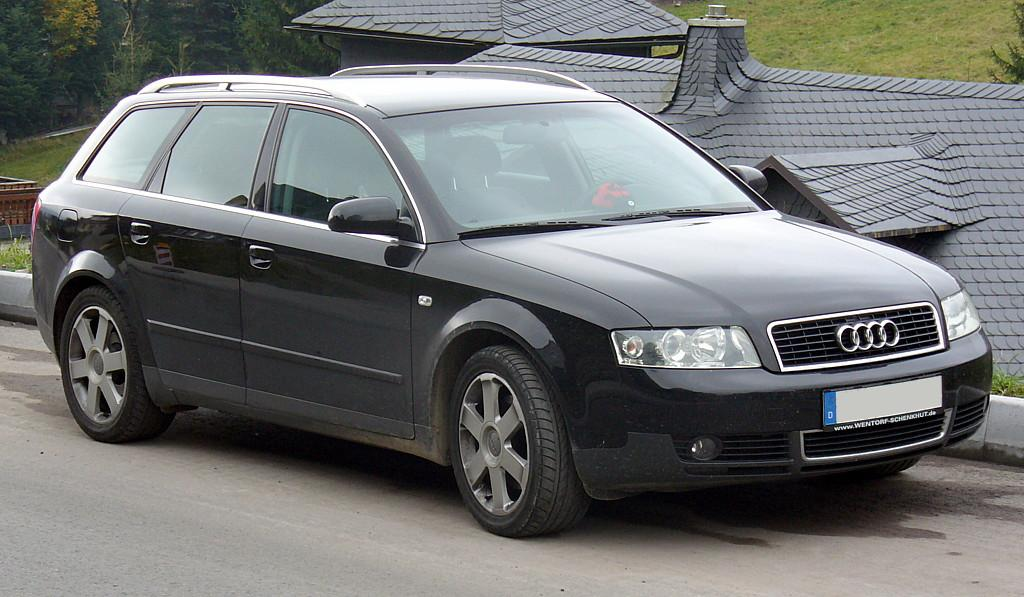
- 2001–2005 Audi A4 Avant (B6)

Overview
- Production: 2000–2006 (FAW-VW)
- Designer: Peter Schreyer (1997); Luc Donckerwolke (Avant)

Body and chassis
- Body style: 4-door saloon/sedan 5-door Avant (estate/wagon); 2-door Cabriolet
- Platform: Volkswagen Group B6 (PL46) platform
- Related: Audi S4 (B6)

Powertrain
- Engine: Inline-four petrol engine: 1.6L I4; 1.8L I4 20v Turbo; 2.0L I4 20v; 2.0L I4 FSI 16v; V6 petrol engine: 2.4L V6 30v; 3.0L V6 30v; V8 petrol engine: 4.2L V8 40v; Inline-four diesel engine: 1.9L I4 TDI; V6 diesel engine: 2.5L V6 TDI
- Transmission: Manual transmission: 5-speed manual; 6-speed manual; Automatic transmission: 5-speed automatic; 6-speed automatic; Continuously variable transmission: Multitronic

Dimensions
- Wheelbase: 2,650 mm (104.3 in), Cabriolet: 2,654 mm (104.5 in)
- Length: 4,547 mm (179.0 in), Avant: 4,544 mm (178.9 in); Cabriolet: 4,573 mm (180.0 in)
- Width: 1,766 mm (69.5 in), Cabriolet: 1,777 mm (70.0 in)
- Height: 1,428 mm (56.2 in), Cabriolet: 1,391 mm (54.8 in)

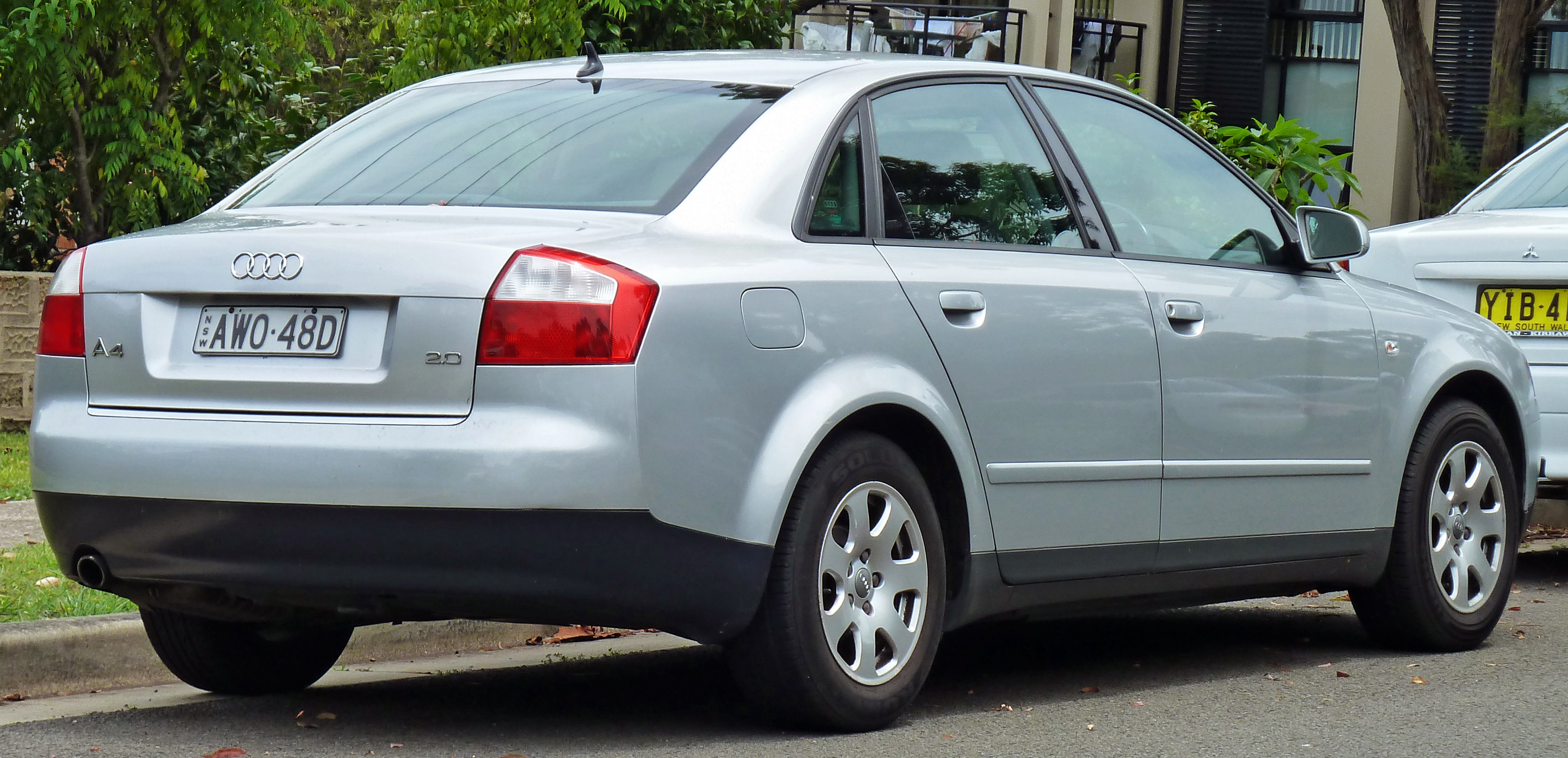
Sedan

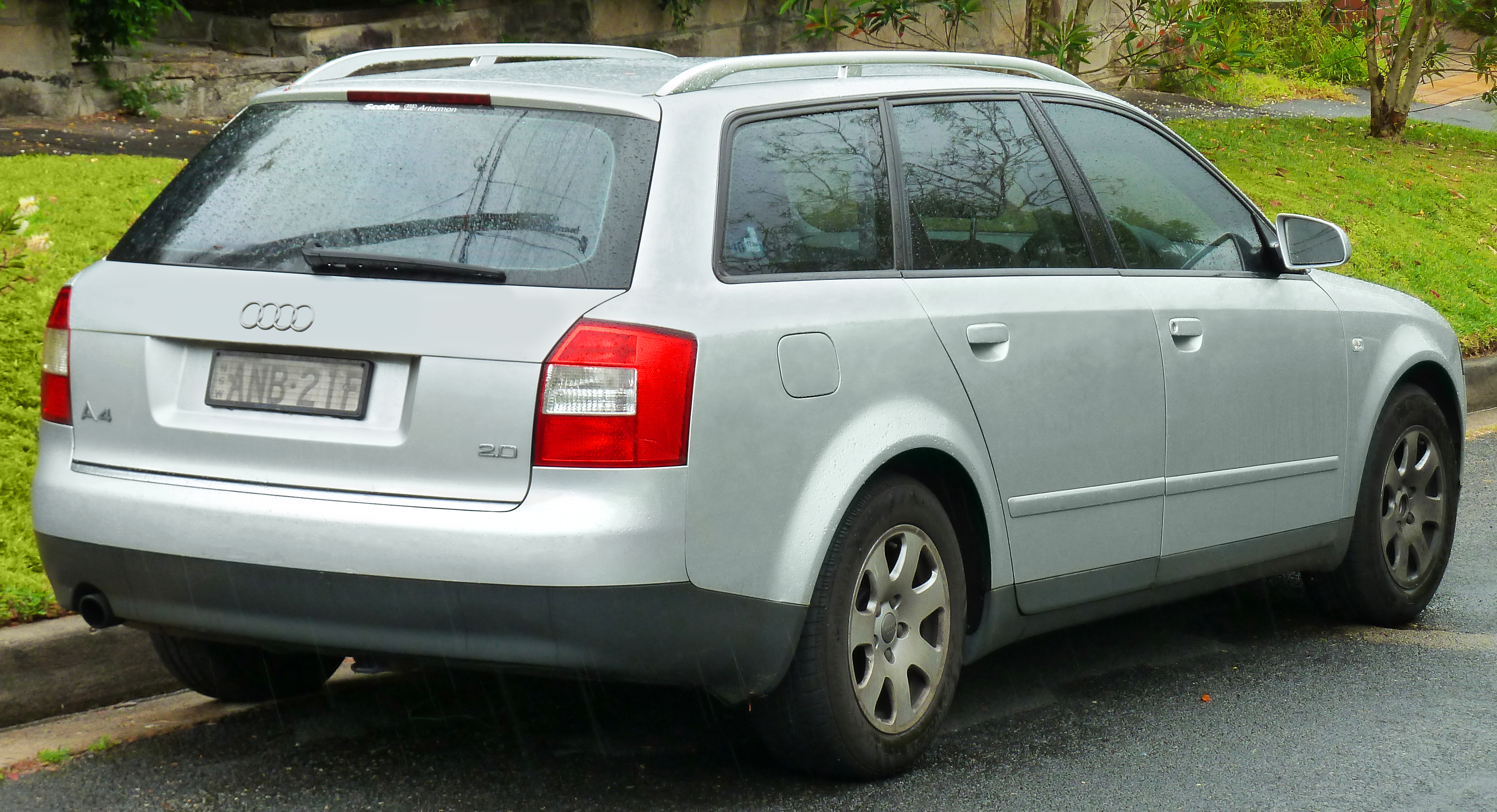
Avant

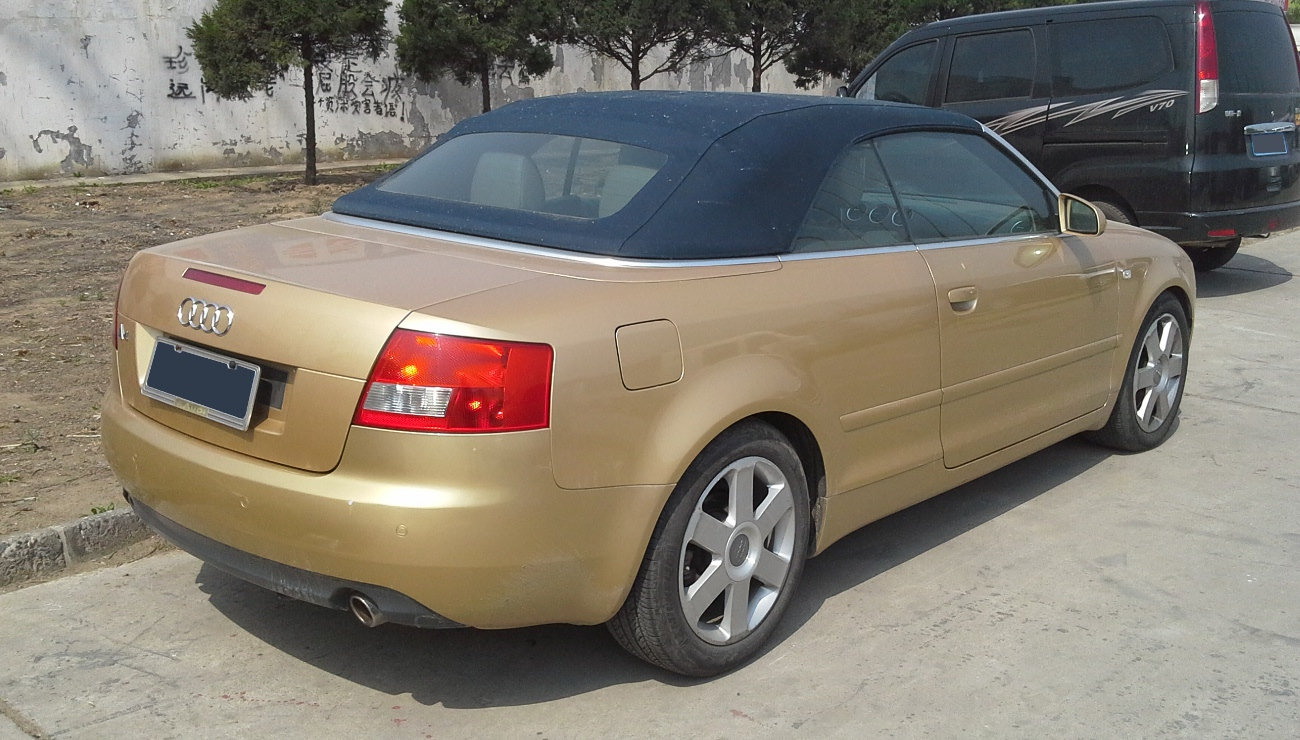
Cabriolet

The next A4, internally designated Typ 8E, debuted on 10 October 2000, now riding on the Volkswagen Group B6 (PL46) platform. The car's new styling was developed under Peter Schreyer between 1996 and 1998, inspired by the Bauhaus design language of the C5 (second-generation) Audi A6 introduced in 1997. The 1.6-litre base model powerplant remained unchanged, but most other petrol/gasoline engines received either displacement increases, or power upgrades. The 1.8-litre 20-valve Turbo was now available in two additional versions, with 150 PS (110 kW; 148 bhp) or 180 PS (132 kW; 178 bhp), this one with a standard six-speed manual gearbox, while the naturally aspirated 1.6-litre straight-four engine and 2.8-litre V6 were replaced by 2.0-litre, and all-aluminium alloy 3.0-litre units, still with five valves per cylinder, the most powerful of which was capable of 220 PS (162 kW; 217 bhp) and 300 N⋅m (221 lb⋅ft) of torque. The 1.9 Turbocharged Direct Injection (TDI) engine was upgraded to 130 PS (96 kW; 128 bhp), with Pumpe Düse (Unit Injector) (PD) technology, and was now available with quattro permanent four-wheel drive, while the 2.5 V6 TDI high-end model was introduced with 180 PS (132 kW; 178 bhp) and standard quattro. This generation of quattro consisted of default of 50:50 front to rear dynamic torque distribution. A Bosch ESP 5.7 Electronic Stability Programme (ESP) system, with anti-lock braking system (ABS), brake assist, and electronic brakeforce distribution (EBD) were standard across the range.

For 2002, Audi increased power in the 1.8 Turbo engines to 183 PS (135 kW; 180 bhp) and 190 PS (140 kW; 187 bhp) – the 190 PS variant designated by a red 'T' on the boot lid. Available with four wheel drive and in the 2.5 TDI intermediate version to 163 PS (120 kW; 161 bhp). A 2.0 engine with Fuel Stratified Injection (FSI) was also available. A year later, Audi reintroduced the S4, now powered by a 344 PS (253 kW; 339 bhp) 4.2 L V8 engine, as well as an A4 Cabriolet convertible variant (Typ 8H), finally replacing the 80-based Audi Cabriolet which had been discontinued in 2000. It included an electro-hydraulic operated roof, which lowered in under 30 seconds and incorporated some styling changes, such as body-coloured lower bumper and sill panels, which later found their way to the saloon version. The Audi A4 Cabriolet version was co-developed and manufactured by Karmann.

Audi introduced a continuously variable transmission developed by LuK, named multitronic, which replaced the dated conventional automatic transmission on front-wheel drive models. There have been widespread complaints from consumers around the world that the transmission box is prone to electronic glitches as well as mechanical problems.

Borrowing from the Audi A6, the boot was redesigned to remove the extension of the top edge with a smoother fold line. The rear light assemblies now formed part of the top line, these styling cues were eventually borrowed by other European as well as Asian manufacturers.

A sport package named 'Ultra Sport' was introduced in the North American market shortly before the B6 was replaced by the B7. It included aluminium interior trim and door sills, "S line" steering wheel, front and rear spoilers, side skirts, and quattro GmbH designed 18-inch RS4 alloy wheels.

=== Engines ===
The following engines were available:

engine type	cyl.	max. power
petrol engines all fuel injected
1.6	I4	102 PS (75 kW; 101 bhp)
1.8 Turbo 20v	I4	150 PS (110 kW; 148 bhp)
1.8 Turbo 20v	I4	163 PS (120 kW; 161 bhp)
1.8 Turbo 20v 'S line'	I4	163 PS (120 kW; 161 bhp)
1.8 Turbo 20v 'S line'	I4	190 PS (140 kW; 187 bhp)
2.0 20v ALT	I4	130 PS (96 kW; 128 bhp)
2.0 FSI	I4	150 PS (110 kW; 148 bhp)
2.4 30v BDV	V6	170 PS (125 kW; 168 bhp)
3.0 30v	V6	220 PS (162 kW; 217 bhp)
S4 4.2 40v	V8	344 PS (253 kW; 339 bhp)
diesel engines all Turbocharged Direct Injection (TDI)
1.9 TDI	I4	100 PS (74 kW; 99 bhp)
1.9 TDI	I4	115 PS (85 kW; 113 bhp)
1.9 TDI	I4	133 PS (98 kW; 131 bhp)
2.5 V6 TDI 24v	V6	155 PS (114 kW; 153 bhp)
2.5 V6 TDI 24v	V6	163 PS (120 kW; 161 bhp)
2.5 V6 TDI 24v	V6	180 PS (132 kW; 178 bhp)

=== Safety ===
The Audi A4 (B6 & B7) passed the Euro NCAP safety and crash tests, and was awarded the following car safety ratings:

- Adult occupant =
- Pedestrian = (pre 2002 rating)

The Insurance Institute for Highway Safety (IIHS) awarded both the B6 & B7 a "Good" rating in the frontal crash test; the B7 was not retested since the front portion is structurally the same.

== B7 (Typ 8E/8H; 2004) ==
Third generation (B7/8E/8H)
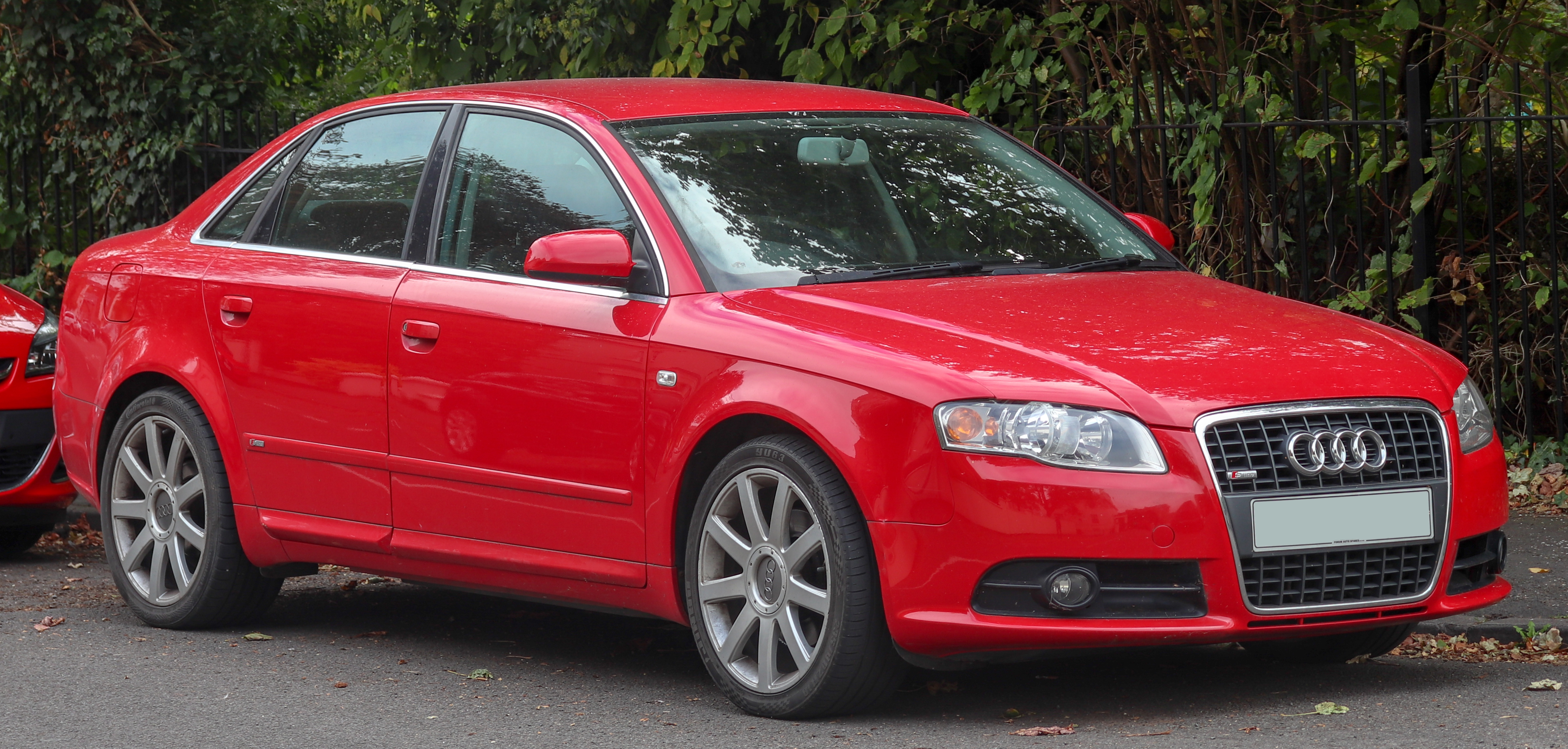
- 2005 Audi A4 T S Line 1.8 sedan

Overview
- Also called: SEAT Exeo
- Production: 2004–2009
- Designer: Walter de Silva (2002, 2003)

Body and chassis
- Body style: 4-door saloon/sedan, 5-door Avant (estate/wagon), 2-door Cabriolet
- Platform: Volkswagen Group B7 (PL46) platform
- Related: Audi S4 (B7), Audi RS4 (B7), SEAT Exeo

Powertrain
- Engine: Inline-four petrol engine: 1.6L I4; 1.8L I4 20v Turbo; 2.0L I4 20v; 2.0L I4 16v TFSI; V6 petrol engine: 3.2L V6 24v FSI; V8 petrol engine: 4.2L V8 32v FSI; Inline-four diesel engine: 1.9L I4 TDI; 2.0L I4 TDI; V6 diesel engine: 2.5L V6 TDI; 2.7L V6 TDI; 3.0L V6 TDI
- Transmission: Manual transmission: 5-speed manual; 6-speed manual; Automatic transmission: 6-speed ZF 6HP Tiptronic; Continuously variable transmission: 7-speed Multitronic

Dimensions
- Wheelbase: 2,648 mm (104.3 in)
- Length: 4,586 mm (180.6 in), Cabriolet: 4,573 mm (180.0 in)
- Width: 1,772 mm (69.8 in), Cabriolet: 1,777 mm (70.0 in)
- Height: 1,427 mm (56.2 in), Cabriolet: 1,518 mm (59.8 in)

Chronology
- Successor: Audi A5 (for A4 cabriolet)

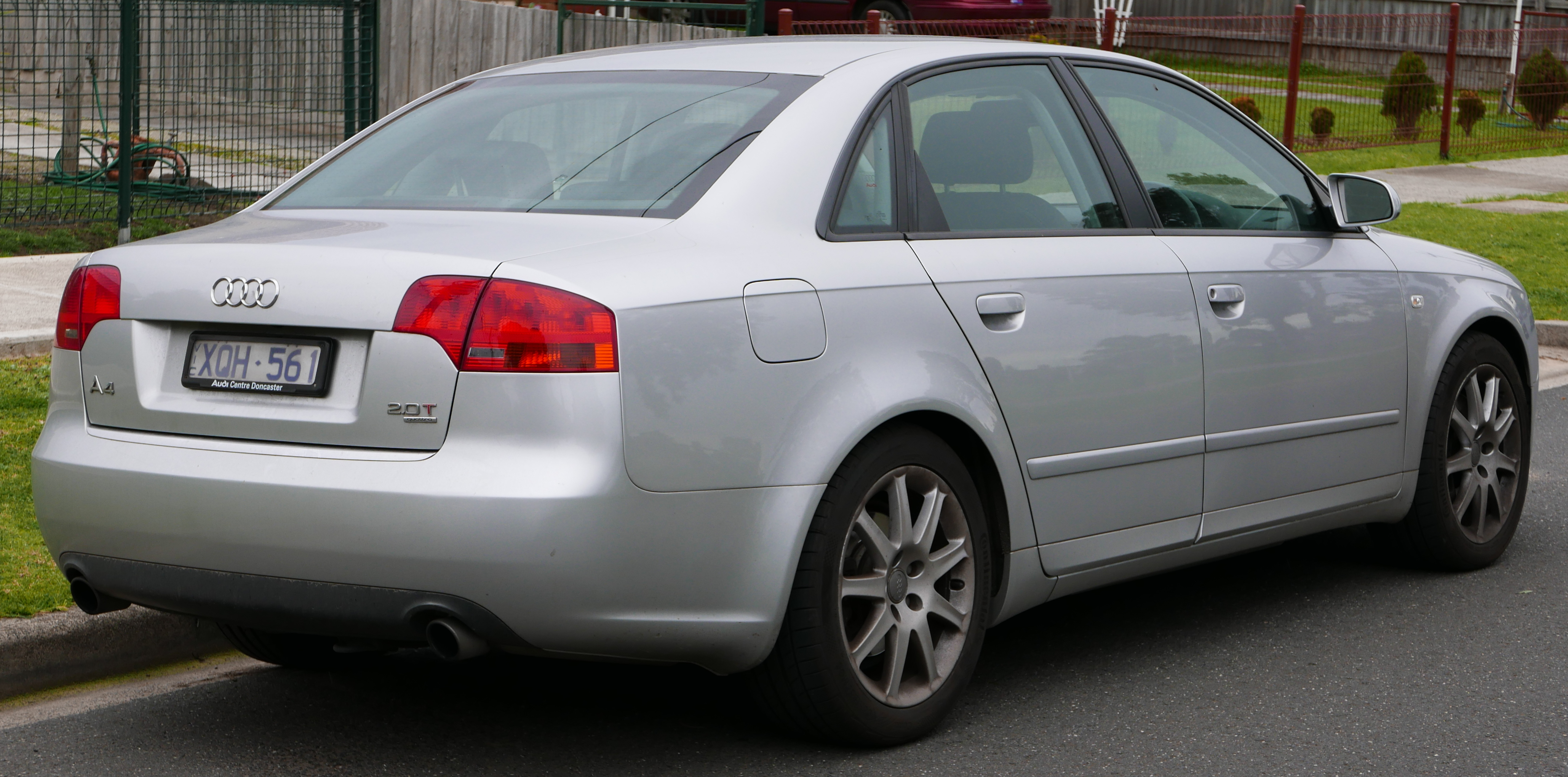
Sedan

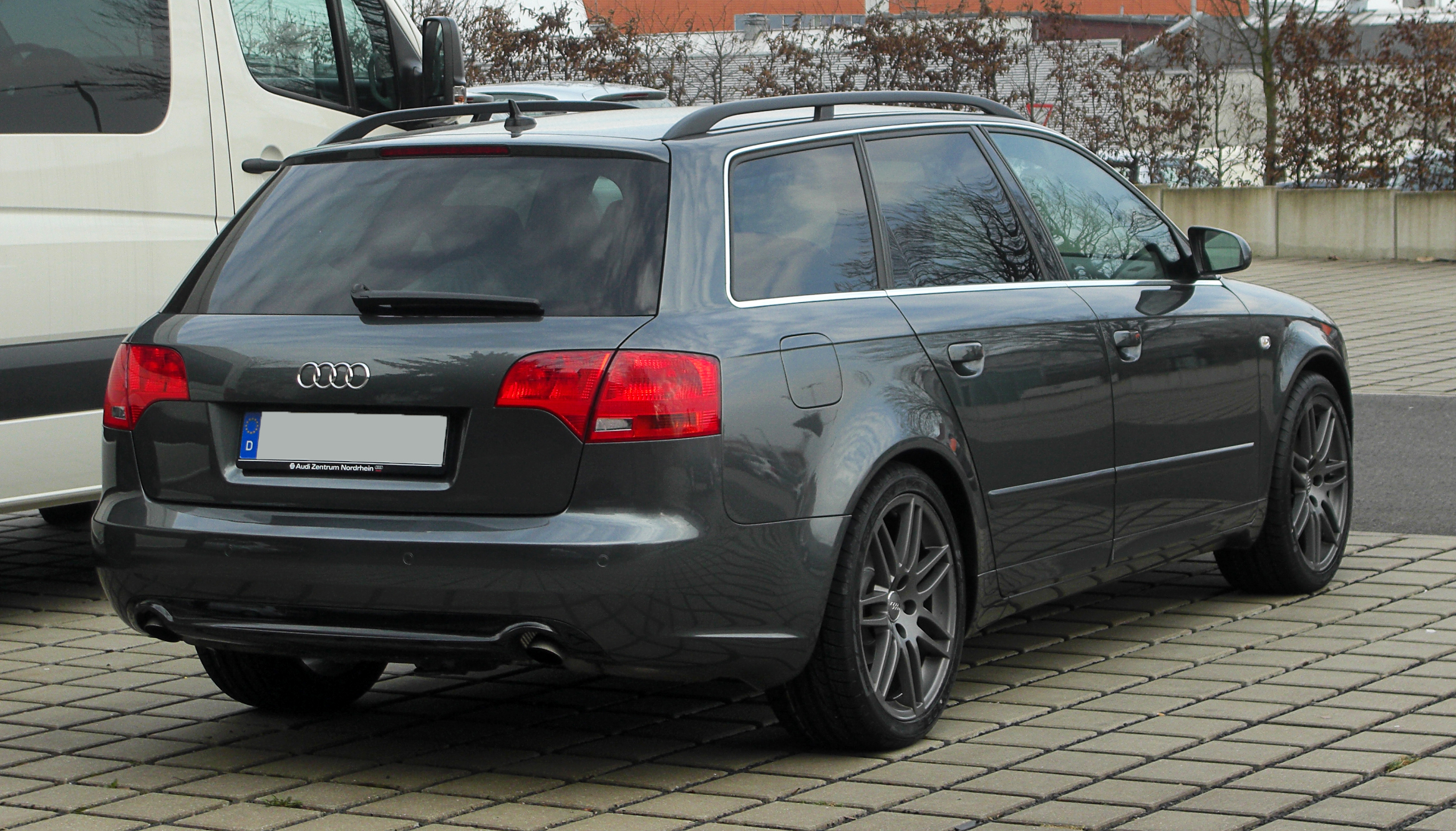
Avant

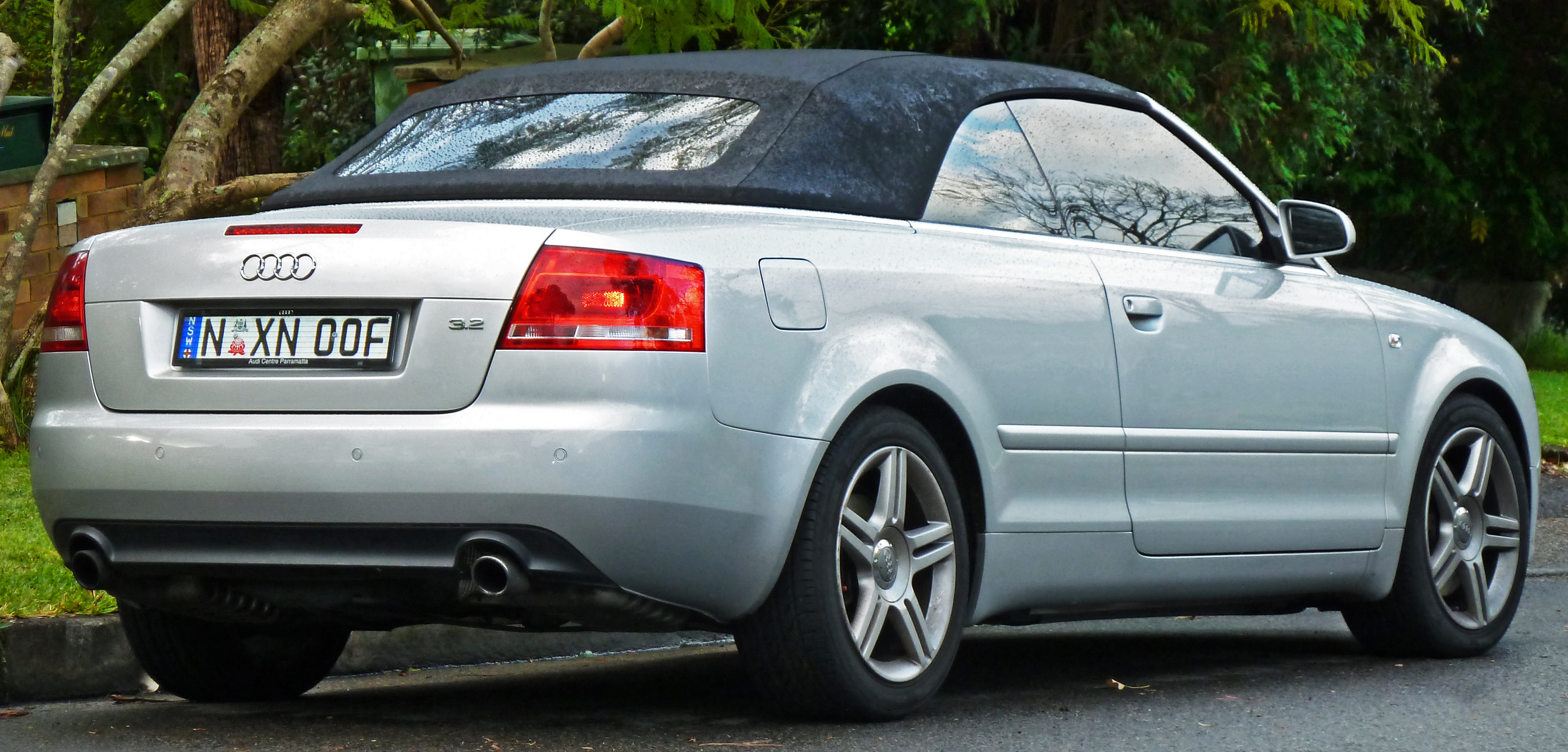
Cabriolet (Note: The competitor: BMW E93 Convertible)

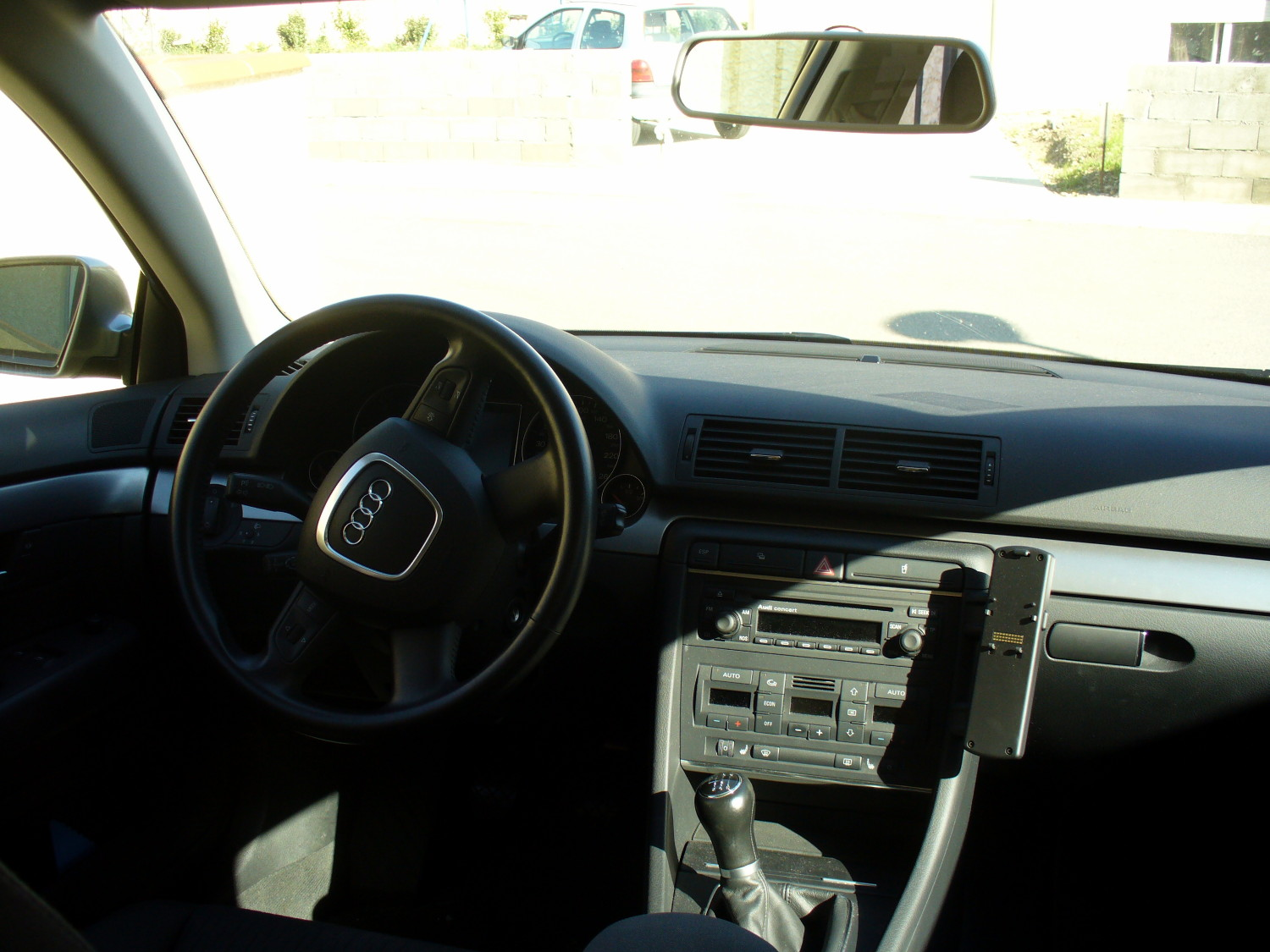
Interior

Audi introduced a heavily facelifted A4 in late 2004, with the internal designation of B7. Although given a new platform designation, the B7 was essentially a heavily facelifted and revised version of the B6, with revised steering settings, suspension geometry, new internal combustion engine ranges, navigation systems and chassis electronics (including a new advanced Bosch ESP 8.0 Electronic Stability Programme (ESP) system). The front grille assembly changed to a tall trapezoidal shape in the same manner as the C6 (third-generation) Audi A6; however, the dashboard and interior were virtually unchanged from the B6 aside from minor detailing.

Audi's internal platform nomenclature uses PL46 (passenger car longitudinal platform, size 4, generation 6) for both B6 and B7 chassis. The Typ 8E and Typ 8H internal designations are also carried over from the B6 A4 range, but now have an additional identifying suffix – 8EC for the saloon, 8ED for the Avant, and 8HE for the Cabriolet.

The engine lineup received many additions. The 2005 introduction of Fuel Stratified Injection (FSI) on the 2.0 TFSI and 3.2 V6 FSI petrol/gasoline engines, as well as other refinements, increased power output to 200 PS (147 kW; 197 bhp) and 255 PS (188 kW; 252 bhp), respectively. These engines both use a four-valve per cylinder configuration. The prior 5-valve design was incompatible with the FSI direct injection system (due to the siting of the fuel injector, now discharging directly into the combustion chamber). The 2.0 Turbocharged Direct Injection (TDI) diesel engine now combined Pumpe Düse (Unit Injector) (PD) technology with 16 valves, while the larger 2.5 TDI V6 diesel was superseded by a 3.0 V6 TDI, offering a 204 PS (150 kW; 201 bhp) model during the year 2005 which was upgraded to a 233 PS (171 kW; 230 bhp) model in 2006. A 2.7 V6 TDI was added later.

Torsen T-2 based quattro permanent four-wheel drive remained as an option on most A4 models. Audi retained the 5 speed manual transmission with the 1.9 TDI and 2.0 non turbo petrol engines while introducing the 6 speed manual for all higher output variants. As before, multitronic continuously variable transmission (CVT), now with selectable 'seven-speeds', was an option on front-wheel drive models, whilst a conventional ZF 6HP 6-speed tiptronic automatic transmission was an option on the quattro four-wheel drive models.

In addition to the Audi S4, which carried over the powertrain from the B6 S4 – Audi reintroduced the quattro GmbH developed Audi RS4 (RS for RennSport) to the lineup, for the first time on the saloon/sedan and Cabriolet body, and with a naturally aspirated, but high-revving 4.2-litre V8 FSI engine. Another inclusion on the RS4 was the latest generation Torsen T-3 Quattro 4WD system, which uses a 'default' asymmetric 40:60 front-rear dynamic torque distribution bias. This new asymmetric center differential was initially only available on the RS4 but was added a year later on the S4. The remainder of the B7 A4 range still used the T-2 50:50 default dynamic split center diff.

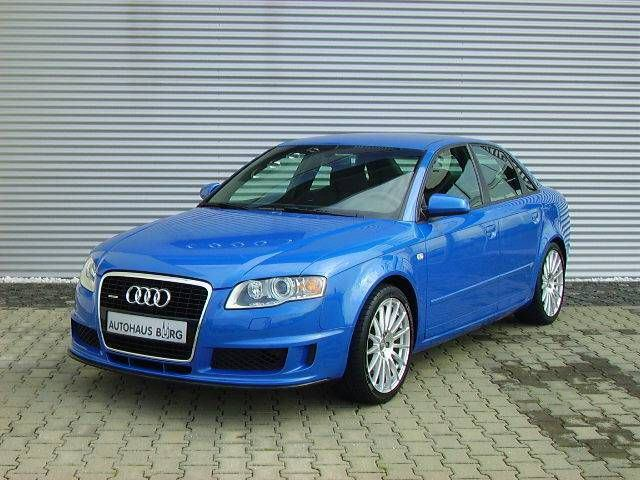
Audi A4 DTM Edition

A variant, developed by quattro GmbH, was first introduced in May 2005, named "Audi A4 DTM Edition". It was inspired by Audi's race cars of the 2004 Deutsche Tourenwagen Masters and was reintroduced in 2006 as a regular option. The 2.0T FSI engine received revised software mapping to the ECU, which increased the output to 220 PS (162 kW; 217 bhp) and 300 N⋅m (221 lb⋅ft) of torque. It was available with front-wheel drive, or Quattro four-wheel drive.

The B7 Cabriolet model arrived later than the other two body variants, being first shown in late 2005 and with sales beginning in February 2006. New on the Cabriolet was an entry-level 2.0 TDI version, which was not offered with the Multitronic CVT gearbox. The Cabriolet version was produced by Karmann until February 2009.

In 2007 Audi introduced a version of the B7 named the 'Special Edition', which built on the S-Line specification and also included the black optics pack, the RS4 style 8J X 18 '7-arm double-spoke' design alloy wheels, Two-tone Graphite/Black Volterra leather, 3-spoke sports leather/Alcantara multi-function steering wheel with gear knob and hand brake handle in Alcantara with silver stitching, ventilated cross-drilled front disc-brakes, black tailpipes and black roof rails (Avant model only). It also had a power increase of 20 PS, giving an output of 220 PS on the 2.0T model.

According to 2007 Swedish vehicle inspection data, the Audi A4 Avant with diesel engine is the most reliable vehicle available on the market, with vehicle inspection rejection rate of 0.0% in three-year-old category.

=== SEAT Exeo ===
When the successor B8 A4 range was introduced, the B7 series A4 was restyled and rebadged as the SEAT Exeo in 2008 with changes to the front and rear plus interior trim from the A4 Cabriolet. The entire Audi B7 A4 production line from Audi's Ingolstadt plant was dismantled and sent to Volkswagen Group's SEAT factory in Martorell, Spain.

=== Engines ===
The following engines were available:

engine type / drive	max. power	saloon	Avant	Cabriolet	0–100 km/h (62 mph) (saloon / manual transmission)	top speed (saloon / manual transmission)
petrol engines all fuel injected
1.6	102 PS (75 kW; 101 hp)	✓	✓		12.6 s	118.1 mph (190 km/h)
1.8 T	163 PS (120 kW; 161 hp)	✓	✓	✓	8.6 s	141.7 mph (228 km/h)
1.8 T quattro	163 PS (120 kW; 161 hp)	✓	✓		8.7 s	140.5 mph (226 km/h)
2.0	130 PS (96 kW; 128 hp)	✓	✓		9.9 s	131.8 mph (212 km/h)
2.0 T FSI (Note: TFSI combines turbocharger and FSI. The badge simply states 2.0 T though.)	200 PS (147 kW; 197 hp)	✓	✓	✓	7.1 s	149.8 mph (241 km/h)
2.0 T FSI quattro	200 PS (147 kW; 197 bhp)	✓	✓	✓	7.2 s	147.9 mph (238 km/h)
2.0 TFSI DTM (Note: In 2005 only available as DTM Edition. From summer 2006 on available for all saloon and Avant.)	220 PS (162 kW; 217 hp)	✓	✓		7.0 s	153.5 mph (247 km/h)
2.0 TFSI DTM quattro	220 PS (162 kW; 217 hp)	✓	✓		6.9 s	151.7 mph (244 km/h)
3.2 V6 FSI	255 PS (188 kW; 252 hp)	✓	✓	✓	6.8 s	155.4 mph (250 km/h) (elec. limited)
3.2 V6 FSI quattro	255 PS (188 kW; 252 hp)	✓	✓	✓	6.4 s	155.4 mph (250 km/h) (elec. limited)
4.2 V8 S4 BBK	344 PS (253 kW; 339 hp)	✓	✓	✓	5.6 s	155.4 mph (250 km/h) (elec. limited)
4.2 V8 RS4	420 PS (309 kW; 414 hp)	✓	✓	✓	4.8 s	155.4 mph (250 km/h) (elec. limited)
diesel engines all Turbocharged Direct Injection (TDI)
1.9 TDI	115 PS (85 kW; 113 hp)	✓	✓		11.2 s	124.9 mph (201 km/h)
2.0 TDI (Note: There were two different versions – one had an 8 valve cylinder head the other had 16 valves. They had the same power and torque output and performed equally. Customers could not choose directly between those two engines. They got the 8-valve version when they ordered the DPF otherwise they got the 16-valve version (BRE engine code). In many countries the DPF became standard equipment for all B7 diesel engines from model year 2006 on and the 8-valve engine was no more.)	140 PS (103 kW; 138 bhp)	✓	✓	✓	9.7 s	131.8 mph (212 km/h)
2.0 TDI quattro	140 PS (103 kW; 138 hp)	✓	✓	✓	9.7 s	128.7 mph (207 km/h)
2.0 TDI	170 PS (125 kW; 168 hp)	✓	✓		8.6 s	141.7 mph (228 km/h)
2.0 TDI quattro	170 PS (125 kW; 168 hp)	✓	✓		8.5 s	139.2 mph (224 km/h)
2.5 V6 TDI (Note: Only available for model year 2005. No DPF available for this engine. In 2006 replaced by the 2.7 V6 TDI engine.)	163 PS (120 kW; 161 hp)	✓	✓		8.8 s	141.1 mph (227 km/h)
2.7 V6 TDI (Note: Not available before model year 2006.)	180 PS (132 kW; 178 hp)	✓	✓	✓	8.4 s	142 mph (229 km/h)
3.0 V6 TDI quattro (Note: Only available for model year 2005. In 2006 replaced by a stronger version of the same engine.)	204 PS (150 kW; 201 hp)	✓	✓		7.2 s	146 mph (235 km/h)
3.0 V6 TDI quattro	233 PS (171 kW; 230 hp)	✓	✓	✓	6.8 s	152.25 mph (245 km/h)

=== Safety ===
The Audi A4 offered several standard safety features, including Bosch ESP 8.0 Electronic Stability Programme (ESP) with anti-lock braking system (ABS), side airbags in the seats, 'sideguard' curtain airbags, and its optional quattro four-wheel drive system. It also received the Insurance Institute for Highway Safety (IIHS) "Top Safety Pick For 2007". EuroNCAP crash test results from the B6 apply to the B7 model.

== B8 (Typ 8K; 2007) ==
Fourth generation (B8/8K)
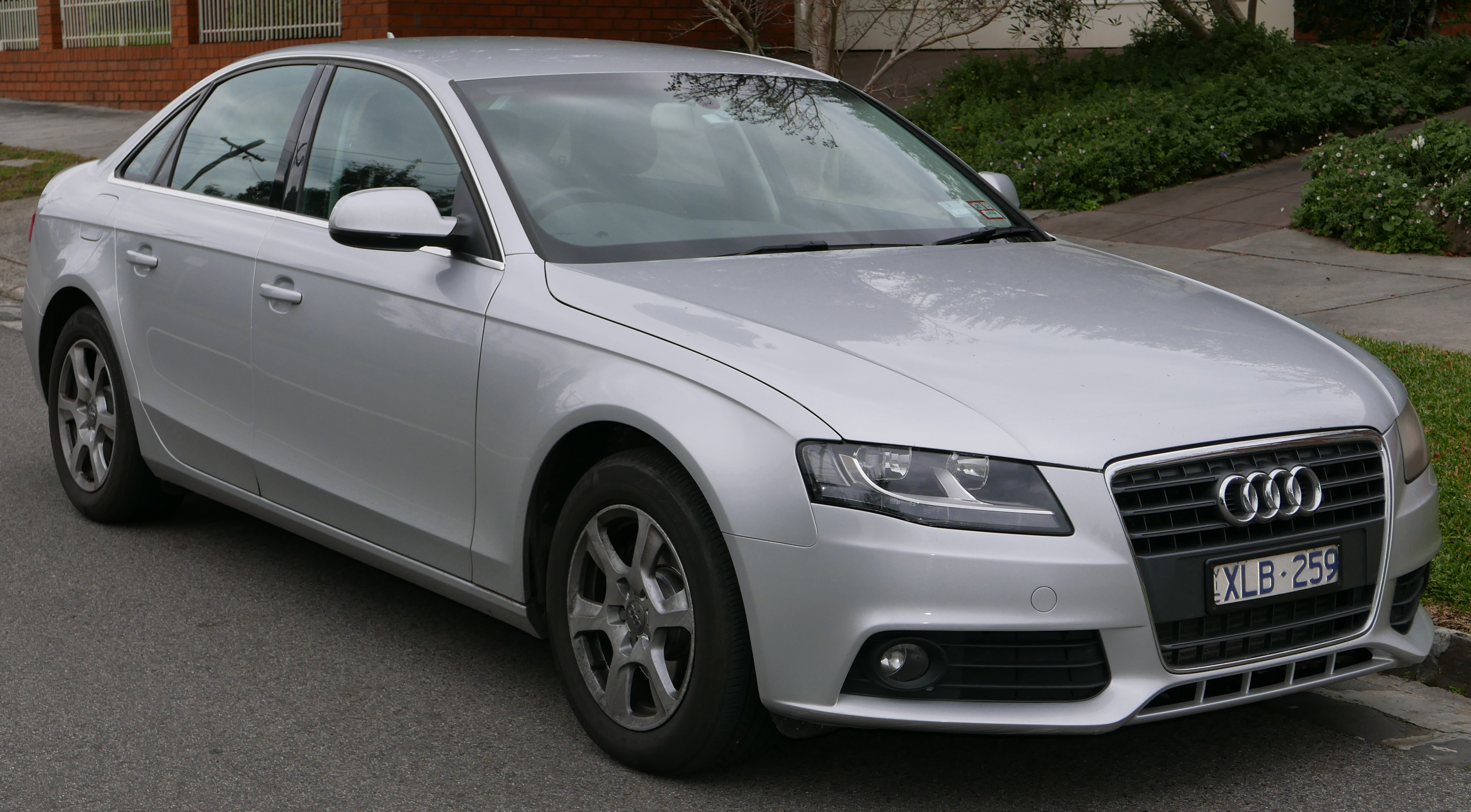
- 2009 Audi A4 2.0 TDI sedan (pre-facelift)

Overview
- Production: 2008–2016
- Designer: Julian Hönig (exterior: 2004, 2005); Ingo Von Bargen (interior: 2005)

Body and chassis
- Body style: 4-door saloon/sedan, 5-door Avant (estate/wagon)
- Platform: Volkswagen Group MLB platform
- Related: Audi S4 (B8); Audi RS4 (B8); Audi A5 (8T/8F); Audi Q5 (8R)

Powertrain
- Engine: Inline-four petrol engine: 1.8L TFSI I4; 2.0L TFSI I4; V6 petrol engine: 3.0L V6 TFSI; 3.2L V6 FSI; V8 petrol engine: 4.2L V8 FSI; Inline-four diesel engine: 2.0L TDI I4; V6 diesel engine: 2.7L V6 TDI; 3.0L V6 TDI
- Transmission: Manual transmission: 6-speed manual; Automatic transmission: 6-speed Tiptronic; 8-speed automatic; Dual-clutch transmission: 7-speed S tronic; Continuously variable transmission: 8-speed Multitronic

Dimensions
- Wheelbase: 2,808 mm (110.6 in) allroad: 2,805 mm (110.4 in); LWB: 2,869 mm (113.0 in)
- Length: 4,703 mm (185.2 in) allroad: 4,721 mm (185.9 in); LWB: 4,763 mm (187.5 in)
- Width: 1,826 mm (71.9 in) allroad: 1,841 mm (72.5 in)
- Height: 1,427 mm (56.2 in); Avant: 1,436 mm (56.5 in) allroad: 1,495 mm (58.9 in); LWB: 1,426 mm (56.1 in)

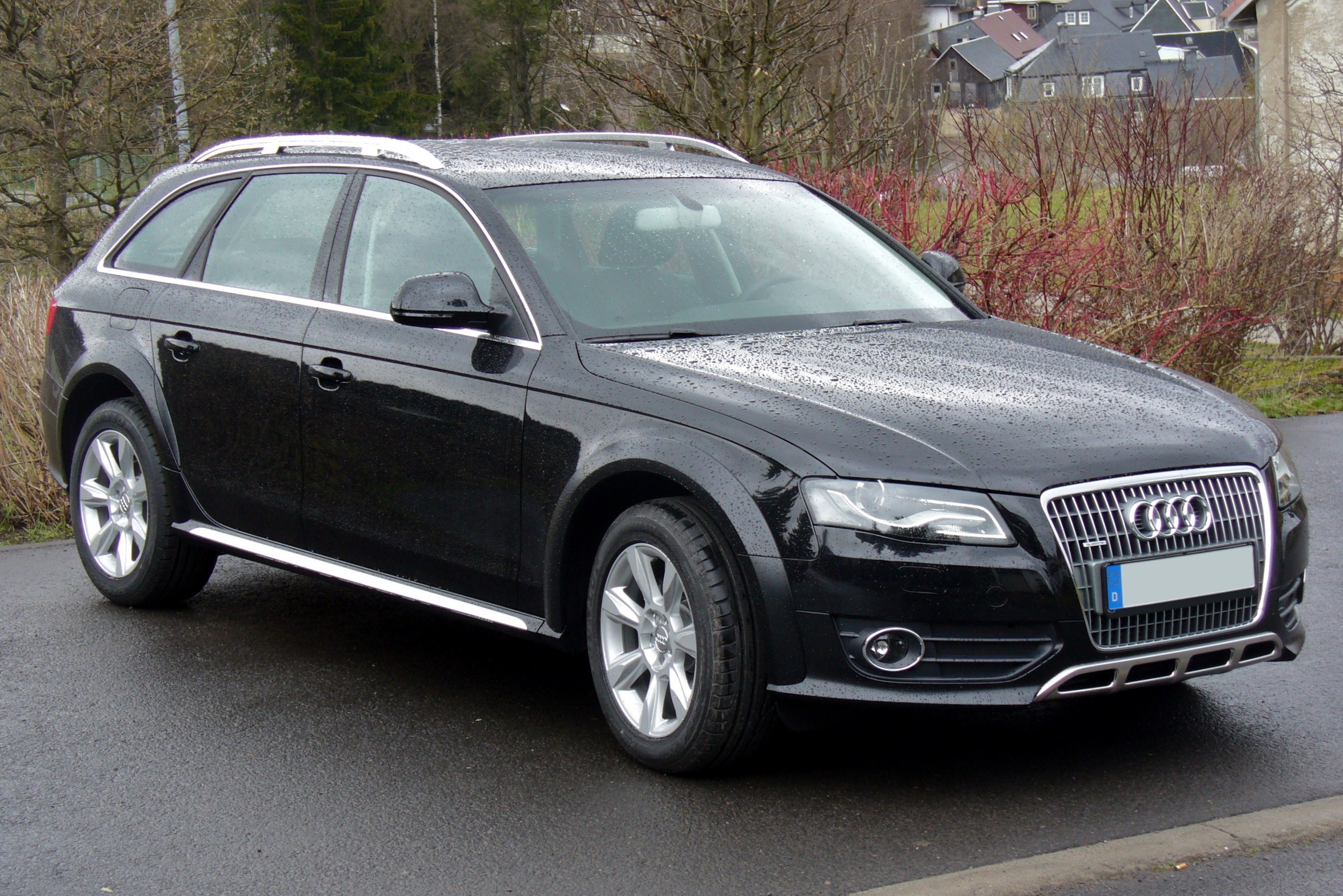

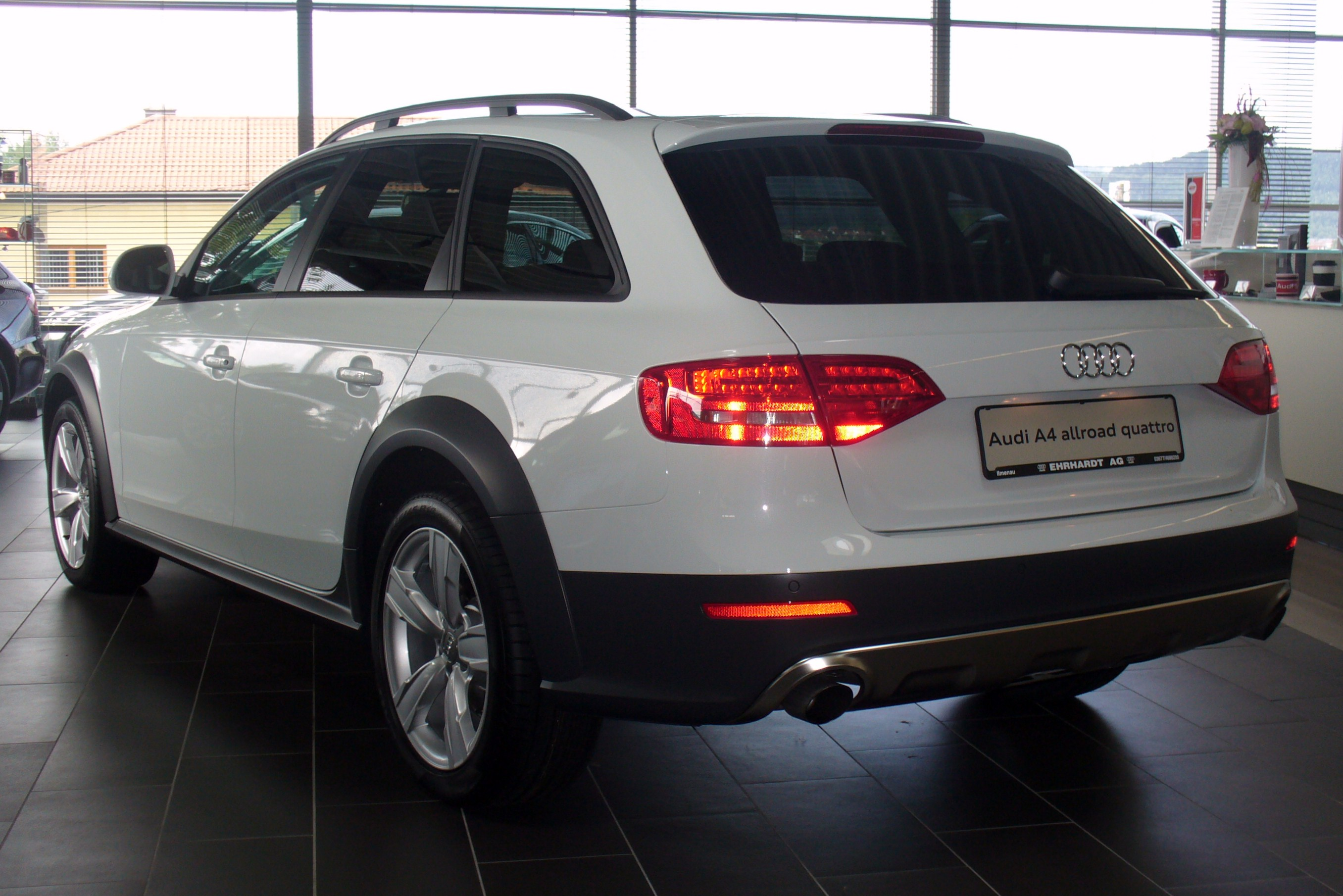
allroad quattro (pre-facelift)

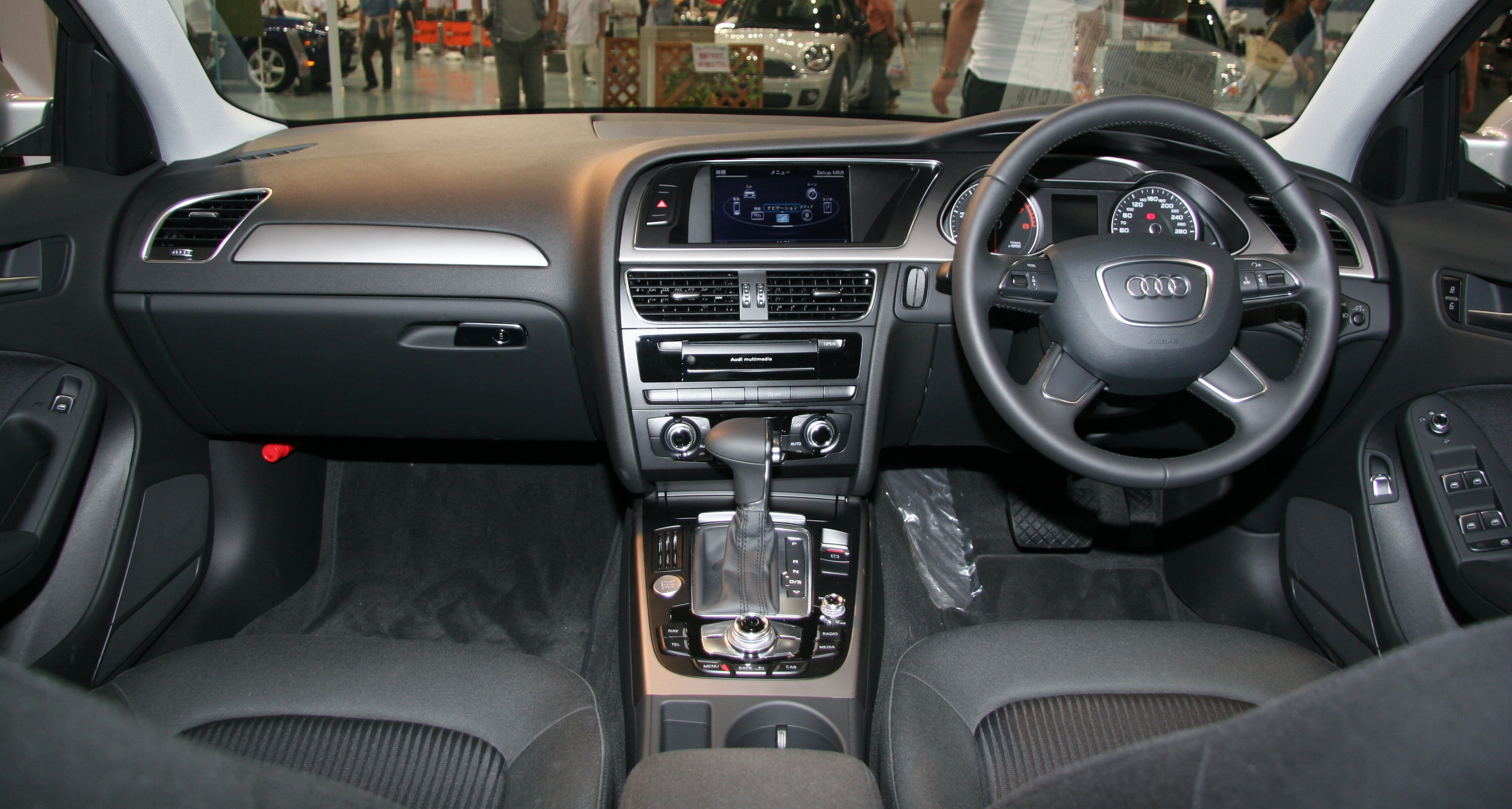
Interior (facelift)

Audi released the first official pictures of the B8 series A4 in August 2007 and unveiled the car to the public at the September 2007 Frankfurt Motor Show. Saloon/sedan and Avant (estate/wagon) models are offered. The Avant was unveiled to the public at the March 2008 Geneva Motor Show. For North America's destined models, the B8 continued in production for the 2016 model year, while Europe began deliveries on the 2016 B9 model.

The B8 A4 is built on a variant of the Audi Modular Longitudinal Platform, a platform that is also used in the Audi A5 coupé. While prior A4 chassis were limited in wheelbase due to the relationship between the engine, transmission and front axle, the MLP allows for a reduced front overhang, resulting in a greater wheelbase length without the same increase in overall length. This effectively redistributes the centre of gravity slightly rearwards, improving handling by better balancing vehicle mass between the front and rear axles. The estimated static front:rear weight ratio of the B8 A4 is approximately 55:45, depending on body style and engine. The relocation of the steering rack in front of the axle also improves handling over previous A4 platforms. Key to the implementation of MLP is the novel mounting of the differential in front of the clutch. This is achieved by driving the flywheel/clutch remotely by means of a 'top hat' shaped drive plate, between which the differential lay shaft passes, whilst power transmission to the final drive is via an inclined transfer shaft which runs the length of the transmission unit. Whilst the platform retains Audi's "overhung" engine mounting position, the front axle is now 152mm further forward than the previous B6/B7 generation platform. The transfer shaft, however, has the effect of creating a large "bulge" on one side of the transmission tunnel, which on right-hand drive versions forces the pedals to be badly offset, which has attracted criticism from the British motoring press in particular.

The B8 A4 has increased in wheelbase by 160 millimetres (6.3 in) and in length by 117 millimetres (4.6 in) over the prior B7, which has allowed for increased rear seating legroom. Although the overall dimensions have increased, the curb weight has dropped some 10%. The boot (trunk) has also increased to 480 litres (17.0 cu ft) for the saloon (sedan) version. The A4 Avant will have a maximum capacity of 1,430 L (50.5 cu ft) with the rear seats folded down.

Reception has been mixed, with praise for the Audi A4's increased size, giving it best-in-class rear legroom and trunk space in the compact executive car segment. Its inline-4 2.0 TFSI engine, while efficient providing plenty of torque, was considered lacking and less refined compared to 6-cylinder engines of lighter rivals who posted faster acceleration times. However, the Audi S4 sports sedan has been well-received for its V6 3.0 TFSI engine's power and efficiency.

The B8 A4 was facelifted in early 2012. During a model, cycle changes are made to integrate new technologies and to keep the model competitive. These changes are referenced based on the model year (MY) of the car. In Australia, the B8 has undergone 2 revisions leading to three variants, the B8, B8 MY10 and B8 MY11.

=== Body types ===
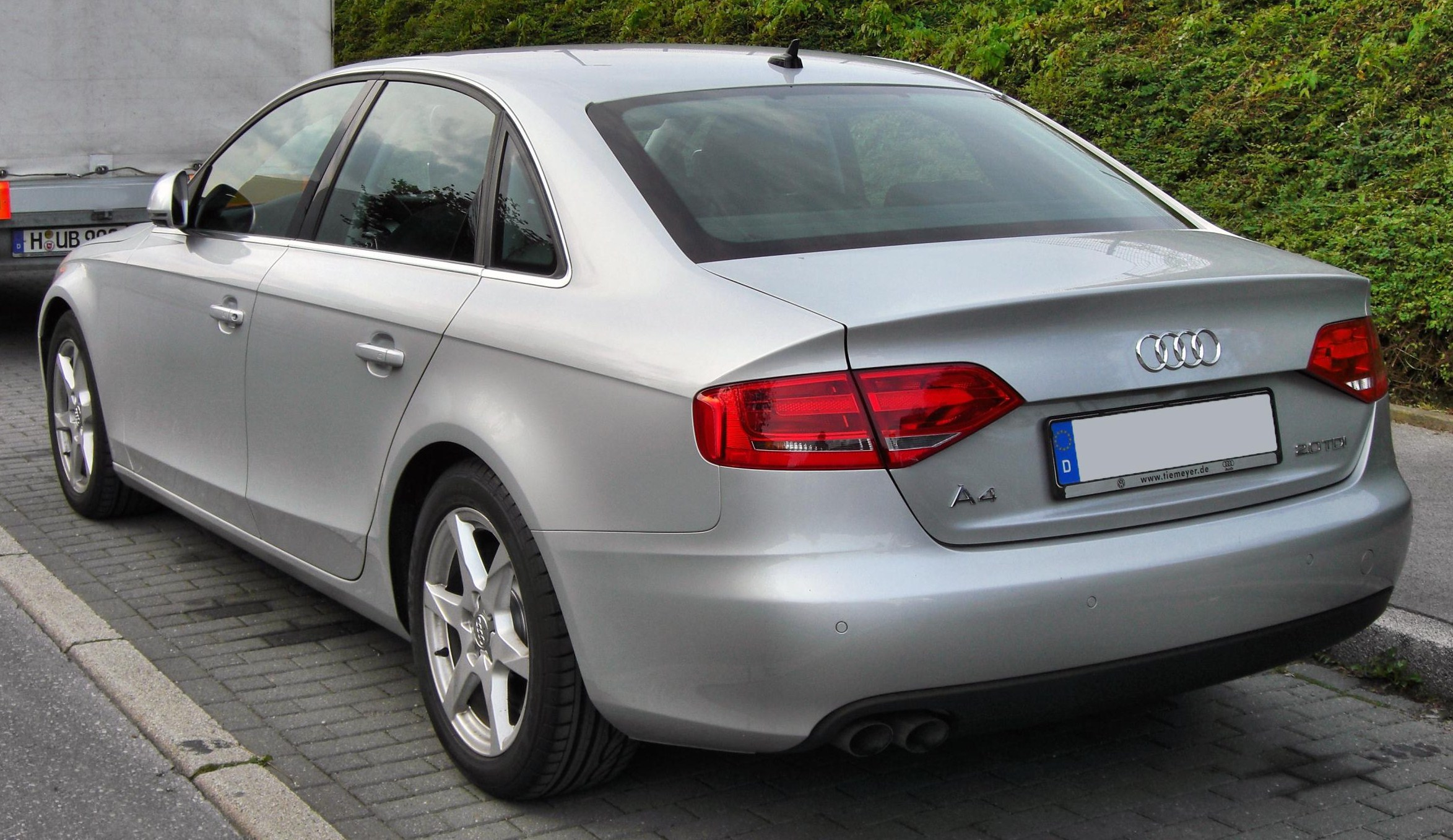
Sedan (pre-facelift)

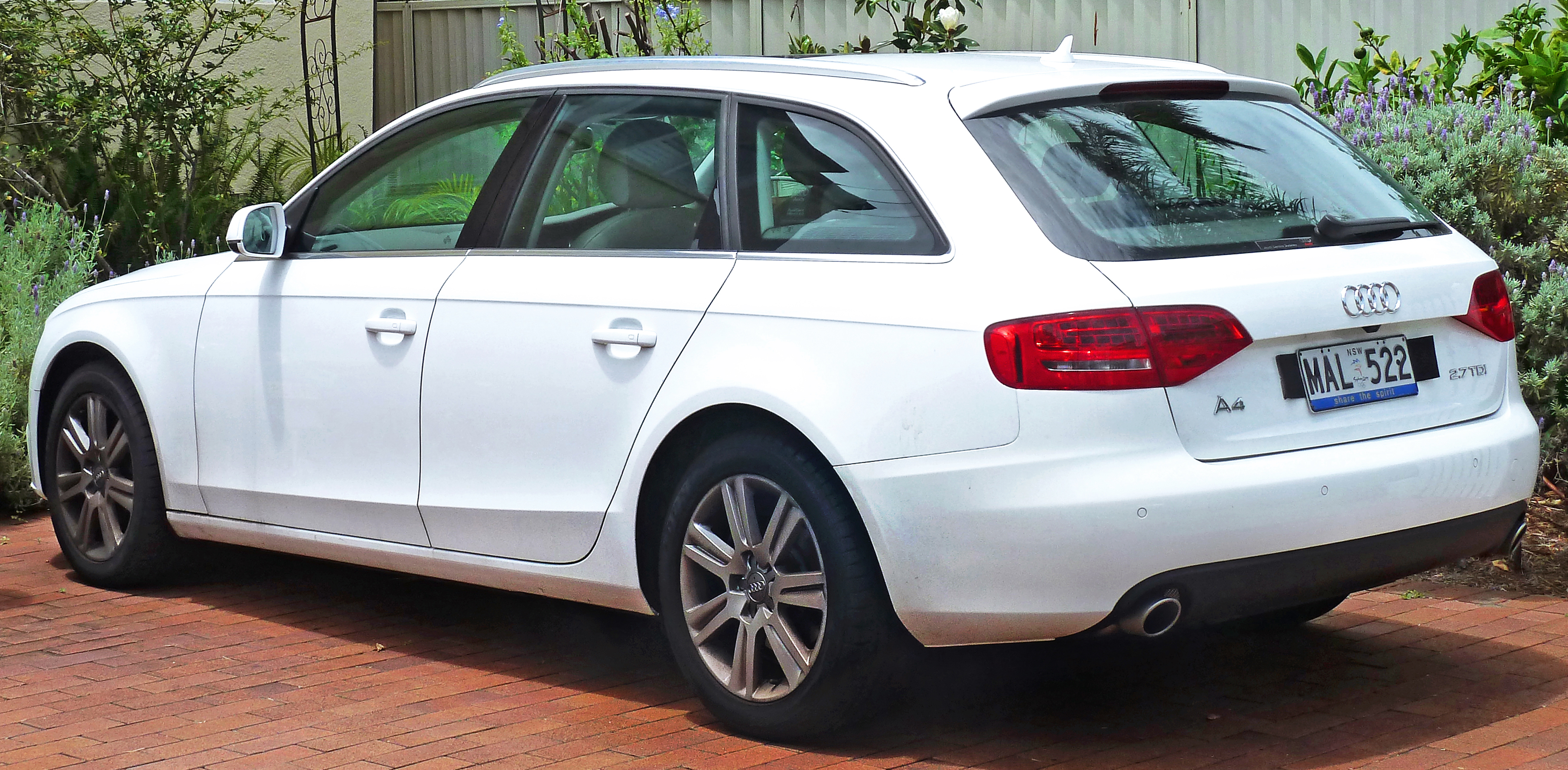
Avant (pre-facelift)

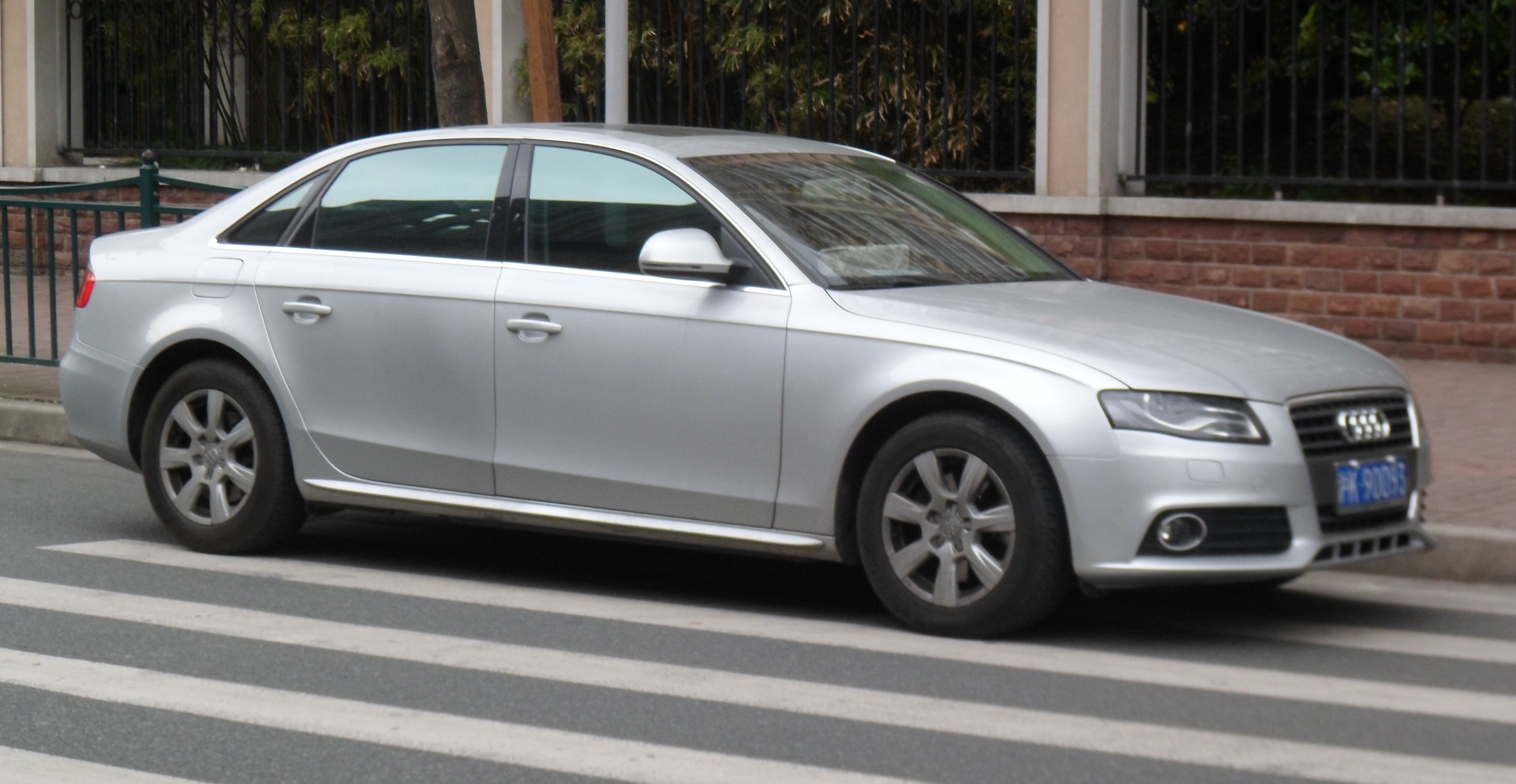
A4L (pre-facelift)

==== Saloon / Sedan ====
Audi released the first official pictures of the B8 series A4 in August 2007 and unveiled the car to the public at the September 2007 Frankfurt Motor Show. Saloon/sedan and Avant (estate/wagon) models are offered.

==== Avant ====
The Avant station wagon/estate was presented at the March 2008 Geneva Motor Show.

==== A4 allroad quattro ====
The A4 allroad quattro is based on the Avant but features a wider track, increased ground clearance, Quattro permanent four-wheel drive, a unique radiator grille, stainless steel underbody guards and roof rails.

The A4 allroad quattro was unveiled in the 2009 Geneva Motor Show and was made available in early summer 2009.

==== A4L ====
The A4L is a long-wheelbase version of the sedan/saloon for the Chinese market, with a 60 mm (2.4 in) longer wheelbase and length. The vehicle was presented at the 2008 Guangzhou Motor Show. The production version went on sale in January 2009. Launch models included a 2.0 TFSI with 132 kW (177 hp) and the 3.2 FSI with 195 kW (261 hp).

=== Specifications ===
==== Body styles ====
Body	Sedan	Avant	A4L	allroad quattro
Year	2011–	2010–	2009	
Luggage capacity	480 litres (17.0 cu ft) with the rear seats in the upright position, and 962 L (34.0 cu ft) with the seats folded	490 L (17.3 cu ft) with the rear seats upright, and 1,430 L (50.5 cu ft) with the seats folded	?	
Curb weight	1,410 kg (3,109 lb) to 1,690 kg (3,726 lb)	1,470 kg (3,241 lb) to 1,695 kg (3,737 lb)	?	

The A4-based convertible models were replaced by the A5/S5 Cabriolet.

=== Engines ===
The B8 powertrain options are the following: engines, transmissions and drivelines: (All United Kingdom specification unless stated otherwise). (for South Africa specification). (for Australia specification). (for New Zealand specification).

Model	Engine code	Years	displacement / type	Power at rpm	Torque at rpm
Petrol engines
1.8 TFSI	CABA/CDHA	2008–2015	1,798 cc (110 cu in) 16v I4 turbo	120 PS (88 kW; 118 hp) at 4500–6200	230 N⋅m (170 lb⋅ft) at 1500–3650
1.8 TFSI, 1.8 TFSI quattro	CABB/CDHB	2007–2011	1,798 cc (110 cu in) 16v I4 turbo	160 PS (118 kW; 158 hp) at 4500–6200	250 N⋅m (184 lb⋅ft) at 1500–4500
1.8 TFSI, 1.8 TFSI quattro	CJEB	2011–2015	1,798 cc (110 cu in) 16v I4 turbo	170 PS (125 kW; 168 hp) at 3800–6200	320 N⋅m (236 lb⋅ft) at 1400–3700
2.0 TFSI, 2.0 TFSI quattro	CDNB/CAEA/CFKA	2008–2015	1,984 cc (121.1 cu in) 16v I4 turbo	180 PS (132 kW; 178 hp) at 4000–6000	320 N⋅m (236 lb⋅ft) at 1500–3900
2.0 TFSI, 2.0 TFSI quattro	CDNC/CAEB	2008–2013	1,984 cc (121 cu in) 16v I4 turbo	211 PS (155 kW; 208 hp) at 4300–6000	350 N⋅m (258 lb⋅ft) at 1500–4200
2.0 TFSI, 2.0 TFSI quattro	CNCD	2013–2016	1,984 cc (121 cu in) 16v I4 turbo	225 PS (165 kW; 222 hp) at 4500–6250	350 N⋅m (258 lb⋅ft) at 1500–4500
3.0 TFSI quattro	CMUA	2012–2015	2,995 cc (183 cu in) 24v V6 supercharged	272 PS (200 kW; 268 hp) at 4780-6500	400 N⋅m (295 lb⋅ft) at 2150–4780
3.2 FSI, 3.2 FSI quattro	CALA	2007–2011	3,197 cc (195 cu in) 24v V6	265 PS (195 kW; 261 hp) at 6500 at 5500–7000	330 N⋅m (243 lb⋅ft) at 3000–5000
S4 quattro	CAKA/CREC	2008–2015	2,995 cc (183 cu in) 24v V6 supercharged	333 PS (245 kW; 328 hp) at 5500–7000	440 N⋅m (325 lb⋅ft) at 2900–5300
RS4 quattro	CFSA	2012–2015	4,163 cc (254 cu in) 32v V8	450 PS (331 kW; 444 hp) at 8250	430 N⋅m (317 lb⋅ft) at 4000–6000
Diesel engines
2.0 TDI	CAGC	2008–	1,968 cc (120 cu in) 16v I4 turbo	120 PS (88 kW; 118 hp) at 4200	290 N⋅m (214 lb⋅ft) at 1750–2500
2.0 TDI e	CAGB	2009–	1,968 cc (120 cu in) 16v I4 turbo	136 PS (100 kW; 134 hp) at 4200	320 N⋅m (236 lb⋅ft) at 1750–2500
2.0 TDI, 2.0 TDI quattro	CAGA	2007–	1,968 cc (120 cu in) 16v I4 variable geometry turbo	143 PS (105 kW; 141 hp) at 4200	320 N⋅m (236 lb⋅ft) at 1750–2500
2.0 TDI e	CA	2012–	1,968 cc (120 cu in) 16v I4 turbo	163 PS (120 kW; 161 hp) at 4200	380 N⋅m (280 lb⋅ft) at 1750–2500
2.0 TDI, 2.0 TDI quattro	CAHA	2008–	1,968 cc (120 cu in) 16v I4 variable geometry turbo	170 PS (125 kW; 168 hp) at 4200	350 N⋅m (258 lb⋅ft) at 1750–2500
2.0 TDI, 2.0TDI quattro	CGLC	2011-	1,968 cc (120 cu in) 16v I4 variable geometry turbo	177 PS (130 kW; 175 hp) at 4200	380 N⋅m (280 lb⋅ft) at 1750–2500
2.0 TDI, 2.0TDI quattro	CNHA	2011-	1,968 cc (120 cu in) 16v I4 variable geometry turbo	190 PS (140 kW; 187 hp) at 3800–4200	400 N⋅m (295 lb⋅ft) at 1750–3000
2.7 TDI	CAMA/CGKA	2007–	2,698 cc (165 cu in) 24v V6 turbo	190 PS (140 kW; 187 hp) at 3500–4400	400 N⋅m (295 lb⋅ft) at 1400–3250
3.0 TDI quattro	CAPA/CCWA	2007–	2,967 cc (181 cu in) 24v V6 turbo	240 PS (177 kW; 237 hp) at 4000–4400	500 N⋅m (369 lb⋅ft) at 1500–3000
3.0 TDI quattro		2011–	2,967 cc (181 cu in) 24v V6 turbo	245 PS (180 kW; 242 hp) at 4000–4500	500 N⋅m (369 lb⋅ft) at 1400–3250

The quattro permanent four-wheel drive system uses the latest Torsen T-3 centre differential, with a default 40:60 front to rear asymmetric torque distribution ratio (used first on the B7 RS4) as standard. (Previous A4 Quattro models split torque with a default front:rear 50:50). The additional torque bias applied to the rear wheels helps mimic the driving dynamics of rear-wheel drive cars.

Audi was reported to stop offering 3.2L V6 models in 2010 model year, but still offers them as of August 2011 (Germany).

All petrol engines use Fuel Stratified Injection (FSI), and all diesel engines use the common rail fuel delivery (with a pressure of 1,600 bars (23,000 psi)), with piezo injectors of their Turbocharged Direct Injection engines.

With the 2012 facelift (the B8.5) came additional 163ps TDIe and TDI Ultra engines, the latter requiring the addition of adblue allowing for cleaner running, both of which fell into the lower emissions tax bracket for the UK, yet presenting a significant performance improvement over the base 136ps and mid-range 143ps models.

==== Transmissions ====
In 2009, Audi announced the seven-speed S-Tronic dual-clutch automatic transmission as an option for A4 in the UK and European markets.

All A4L models include Speed 8 multitronic continuously variable/manual transmission, except for A4L 3.2 FSI quattro, which includes Tiptronic automatic transmission.

Volkswagen settled a class-action lawsuit in 2013 involving the failures of the CVT transmission in its Audi A4 and A6 automobiles for model years 2002–2006.

=== Performance ===
Vehicle model, transmission	Acceleration 0–100 km/h (62 mph) (s) (saloon)	top speed (saloon)	CO_{2} emissions (g/km) (saloon) (Directive 80/1268/EEC)	notes
2.0 TFSI, 6-speed Manual	6.9	250 km/h (155 mph) (elec. limited)	149	
1.8 TFSI, 6-speed Manual	8.6	225 km/h (140 mph)	164	
1.8 TFSI, 8-speed Multitronic CVT	8.6	225 km/h (140 mph)	169	
2.0 TFSI, 8-speed Multitronic CVT	8.2	236 km/h (147 mph)	167	Aus/NZ/ZA only
2.0 TFSI, 8-speed Multitronic CVT	6.9	241 km/h (150 mph)	167	
2.0 TFSI quattro, 6-speed Manual	6.6	246 km/h (153 mph)	169	
2.0 TFSI quattro, 8-speed ZF 8HP	6.5	241 km/h (150 mph)	172	
3.2 FSI, Multitronic CVT	6.5	250 km/h (155 mph) (elec. limited)	194	
3.2 FSI quattro, 6-speed Manual	6.0	250 km/h (155 mph) (elec. limited)	213	
3.2 FSI quattro, 6-speed Tiptronic	6.1	250 km/h (155 mph) (elec. limited)	215	
Diesel engines (all common rail (CR) Turbocharged Direct Injection (TDI))
2.0 TDI, 6-speed Manual	10.7	205 km/h (127 mph)	129	
2.0 TDI, 6-speed Manual	9.4	215 km/h (134 mph)	134	
2.0 TDI, 8-speed Multitronic CVT	9.4	215 km/h (134 mph)	149	
2.0 TDI 6-speed Manual	8.3	215 km/h (134 mph)	120	
2.0 TDI quattro, 6-speed Manual	8.3	226 km/h (140 mph)	149	
2.7 TDI, 8-speed Multitronic CVT	7.7	226 km/h (140 mph)	167	
3.0 TDI quattro, 6-speed Manual	6.1	250 km/h (155 mph) (elec. limited)	172	
3.0 TDI quattro, 6-speed Tiptronic	6.3	250 km/h (155 mph) (elec. limited)	182	

==== Equipment ====
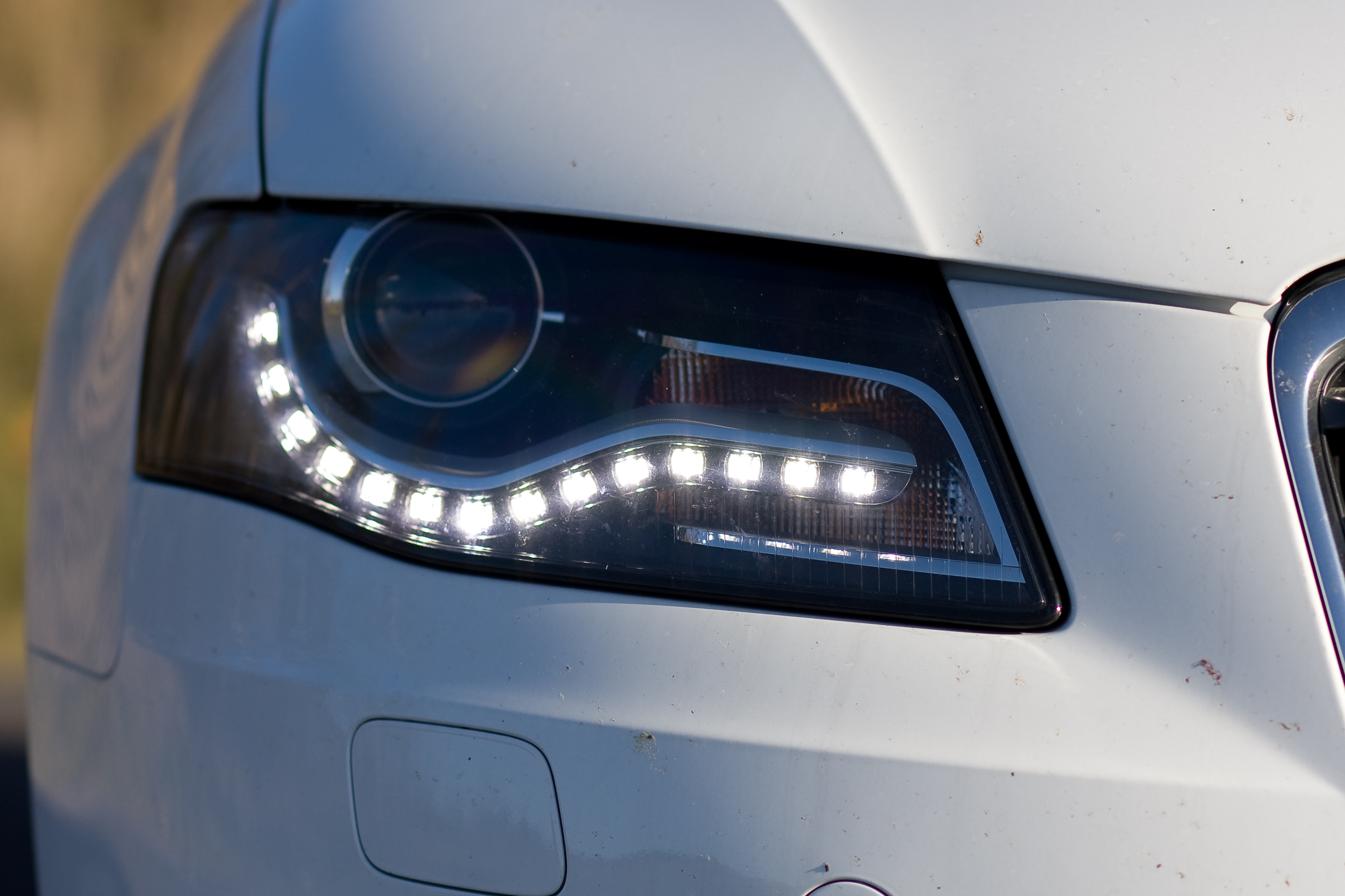
LED daytime running lights of the A4

Standard equipment on the B8 A4 includes:

- LED daytime running lights (on some models);
- MMI system (Multi Media Interface) (multi-mode interface of driver information and entertainment systems); (3rd generation MMI expected in vehicles produced from week 22 of 2009). Standard system (Audi Concert/Symphony models) does not include navigation or Bluetooth connectivity (or Bluetooth audio streaming - applicable to 2012 facelift onwards, B8.5 models)
- Electronic hand brake
- Speed sensitive power steering ('servotronic' – on some models)

Options:

- Audi Lane Assist (lane departure warning system);
- Audi Side Assist (blind spot monitor);
- Adaptive Cruise Control (ACC);
- Advanced Key (keyless entry and start);
- Bang & Olufsen 14 speaker sound system (505W);
- Advanced parking system front and rear with reversing camera;
- Navigation system with full MMI with 7-inch (180 mm) screen;
- Adaptive headlights (with cornering technology);
- Audi Drive Select;

=== Safety ===
==== ANCAP ====
ANCAP test results Audi A4 all sedan variants (2008)
Test	Score
Overall	5 /5 stars
Frontal offset	14.45/16
Side impact	16/16
Pole	2/2
Seat belt reminders	2/3
Whiplash protection	Not Assessed
Pedestrian protection	Marginal
Electronic stability control	Standard

==== Euro NCAP ====
The Audi A4 (B8) Euro NCAP crash tests ratings (pre-2009 testing):

- Adult occupant =
- Child occupant =
- Pedestrian =

Euro NCAP (2009 testing):

- Overall =
- Adult occupant = 93%
- Child occupant = 84%
- Pedestrian = 39%

==== Insurance Institute for Highway Safety (IIHS) ====
IIHS scores:
Moderate overlap frontal offset	Good	
Small overlap frontal offset	Good (2017 models-present)	Poor (2009 models–2016 models)
Side impact	Good	
Roof strength	Good	

Head and seat restraints Good

==== NHTSA ====
NHTSA 2012 A4 saloon FWD:
Overall:	4/5 stars
Frontal Driver:	3/5 stars
Frontal Passenger:	4/5 stars
Side Driver:	4/5 stars
Side Passenger:	5/5 stars
Side Pole Driver:	5/5 stars
Rollover:	5/5 stars

=== A4 TDI concept e (2008) ===
It includes a common rail 1,968 cc (120 cu in) TDI diesel engine rated at 120 PS (88 kW; 118 hp) and 290 N⋅m (214 lb⋅ft), a stop-start system and regenerative braking. It can achieve a fuel consumption of 3.99L/100 km (58.95 mpg) and CO_{2} output of 105 g/km. It can accelerate from 0-100 km/h (62 mph) in 10.7 seconds, with a top speed of 206 km/h (128 mph).

Other features include electric motor-based power steering, revised aerodynamics, low-rolling-resistance 225/45R17 tires, and electric actuation of the rear brakes.

The car was unveiled in Paris Motor Show.

=== Facelift (2012–2015) ===
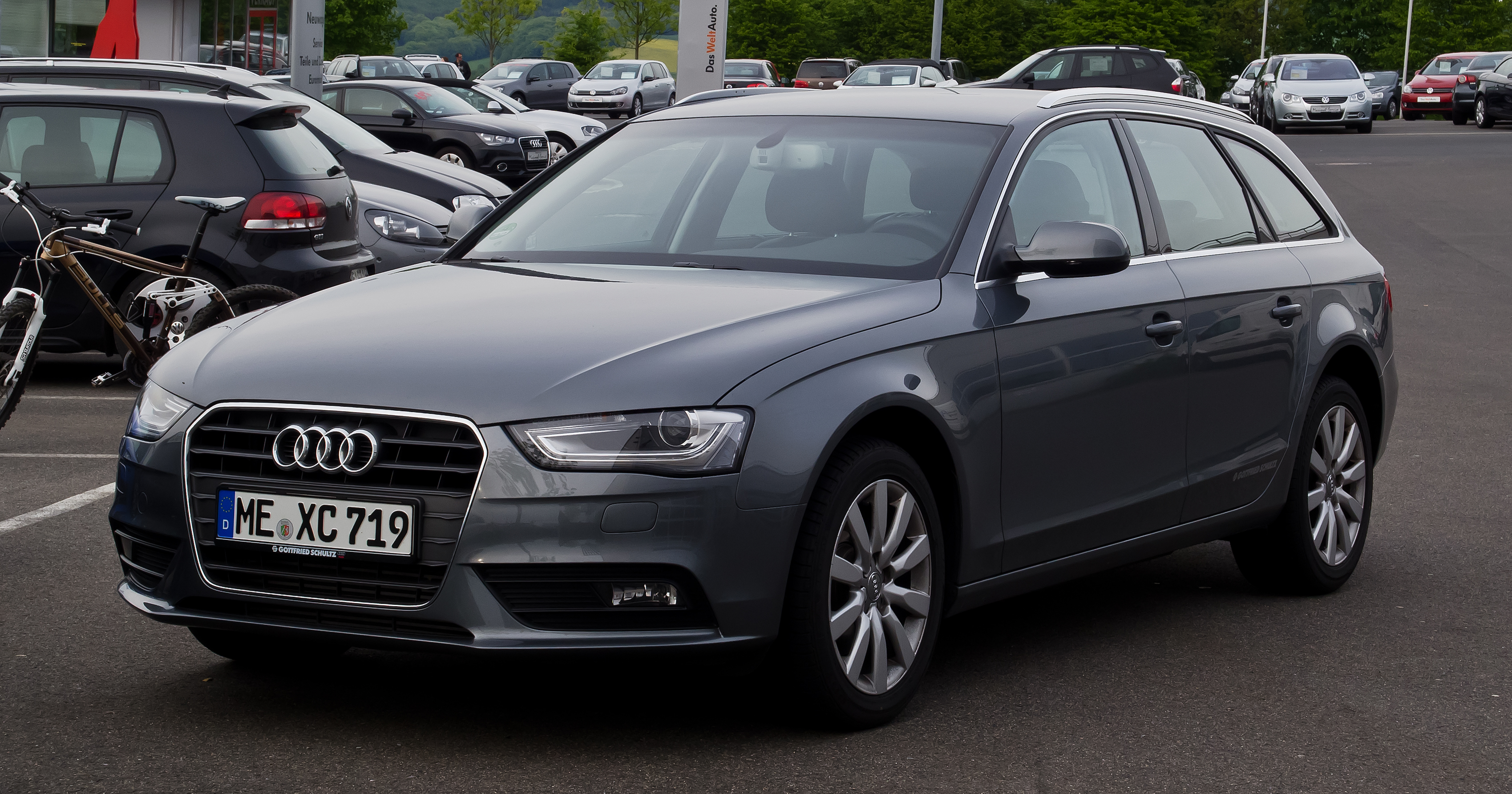

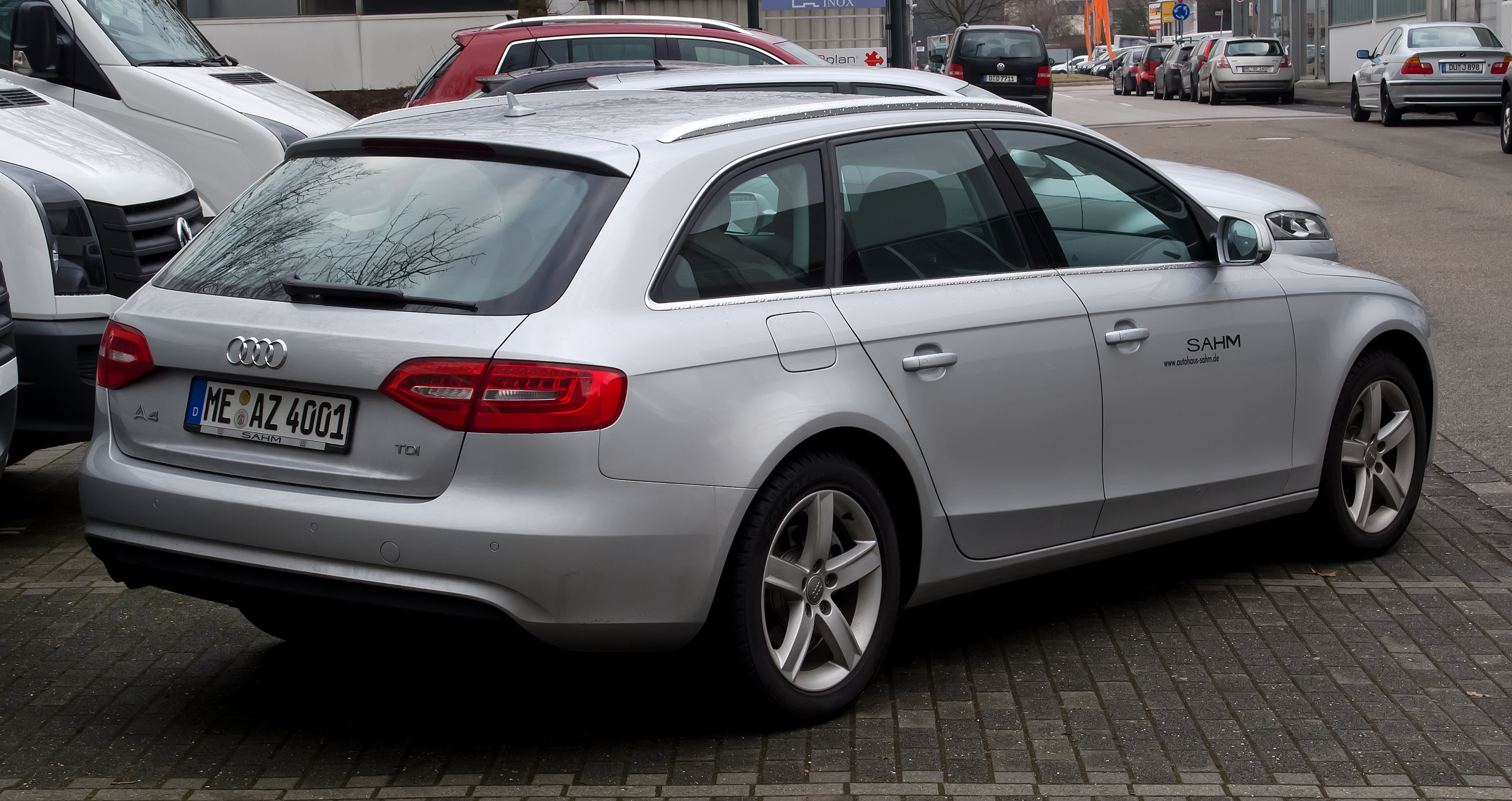
Avant (facelift)

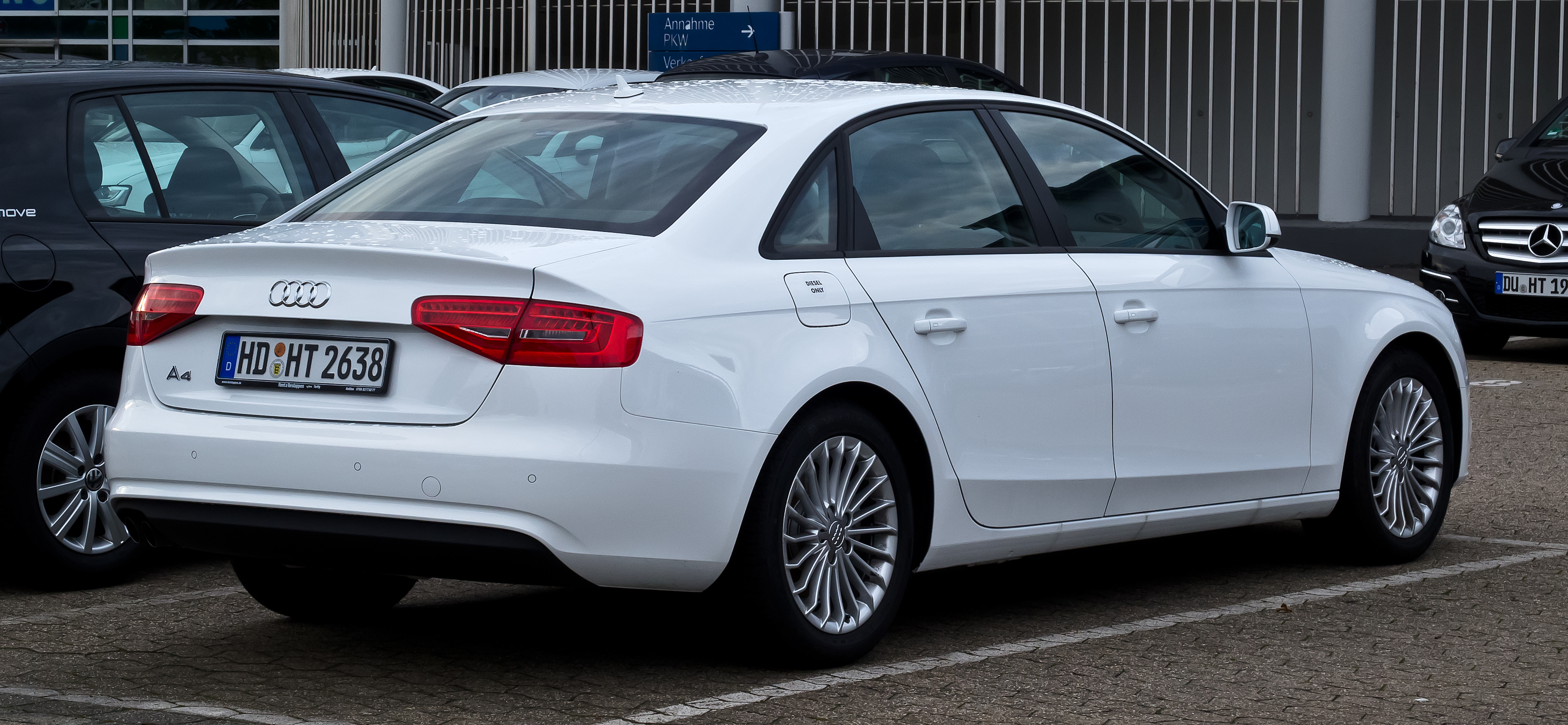
Sedan (facelift)

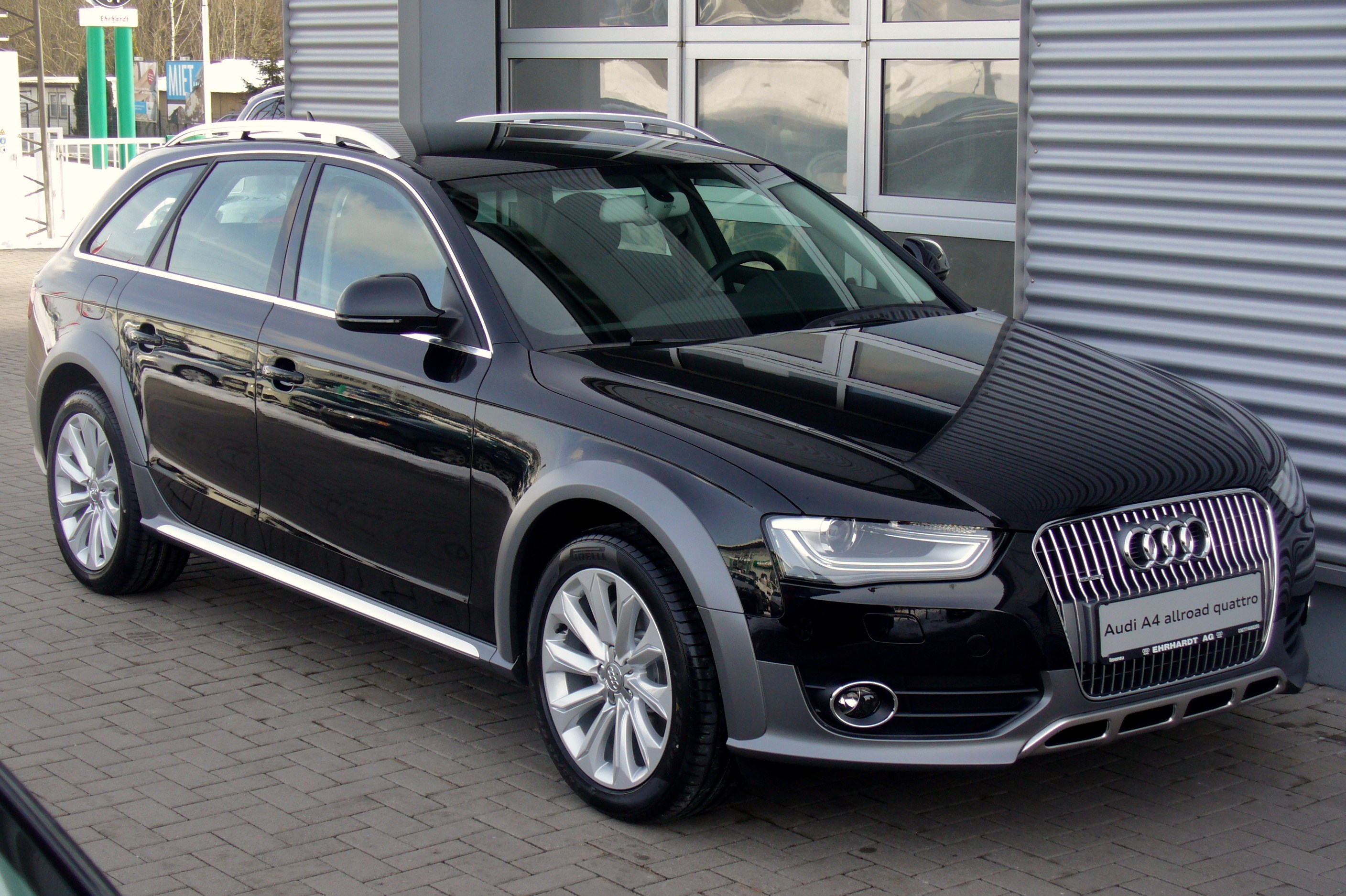

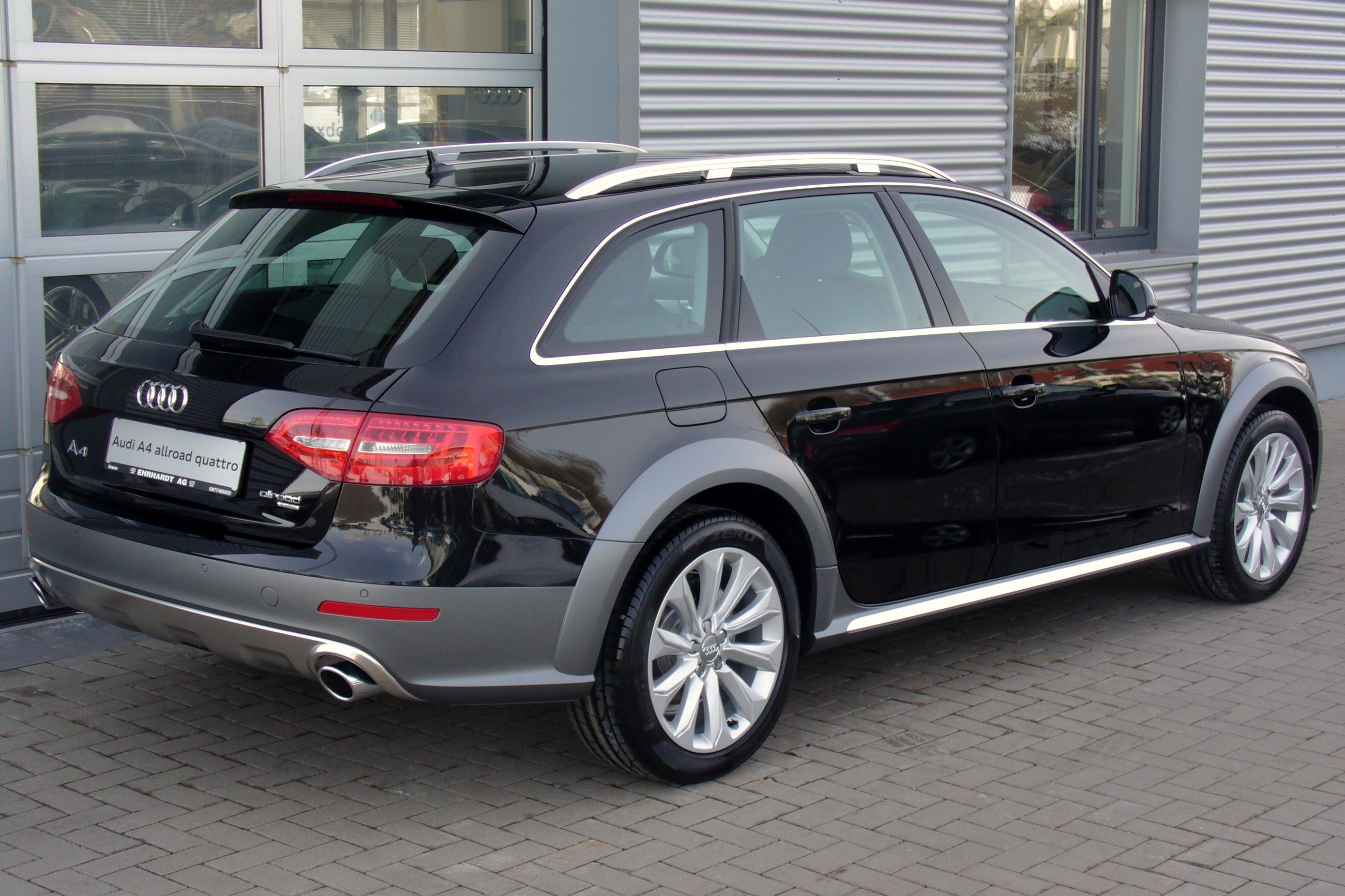
Allroad quattro (facelift)

The facelift model of the Audi A4 was released in 2012 for the 2013 model year. It features redesigned LED headlamps and taillights, front air dam with fog lamps, and closely set twin exhausts. Interior changes include Bluetooth connectivity for audio streaming (nav equipped models only) and a redesigned ignition key. Controls for air-conditioning, infotainment, and power windows gain chrome clasps. Other detail interior changes include larger steering column stalk switches first seen in the D4-series Audi A8 and a simplified layout for the HVAC control panel – for example the temperature setting for the heated seats is now directly set by a single button and is no longer controlled using the MMI dial. The A4 includes a radio with eight speakers as standard, while the MMI navigation system with voice dialogue is optional. A new "Drive Select System" allows drivers to choose comfort, dynamic, individual, or efficiency modes for fuel-efficiency. The power output of the 1.8 TFSI engine is 170 bhp and 320 Nm of torque – up 10 bhp and 70 Nm from the previous versions. Electromechanical power steering is standard.

In Europe, the wide range of Audi A4 saloon and Avant estate are available with the 1.8 TFSI, 2.0 TFSI, and 3.0 TFSI gasoline engines (same 7-speed S tronic and 3.0 TFSI supercharged V6 as the Audi S4 but detuned to 272 bhp and 292 lb ft of torque in the A4 3.0 TFSI) Twin Test: BMW 335i Vs Audi A4 3.0 TFSI…, as well as 2.0 TDI, 2.0 TDIe, and 3.0 TDI diesel motors. Trim levels are Attraction, Ambition, and Ambiente. In the UK, the A4 range is offered in SE, SE Technik, Technik, S line, and Black Edition model grades. All-wheel-drive Quattro is offered in most engine and grade combinations.

For North America, the facelift model Audi A4 sedan is only offered with a 2.0 TFSI turbocharged inline-4 gasoline engine, while the performance upgrade remains the Audi S4 with a 3.0 TFSI supercharged V6 gasoline engine, and no diesel engines were offered. Model grades are Premium, Premium Plus, and Prestige. The Avant was discontinued, leaving the Allroad Quattro as the only station wagon body style. For the 2016 model year, the A4 and S4 continued in B8 production. The B9 A4 would not reach the North American market until the 2017 model year, while the S4 variant would not be available until the 2018 model year.

== B9 (Typ 8W; 2015) ==
Fifth generation (B9/8W)
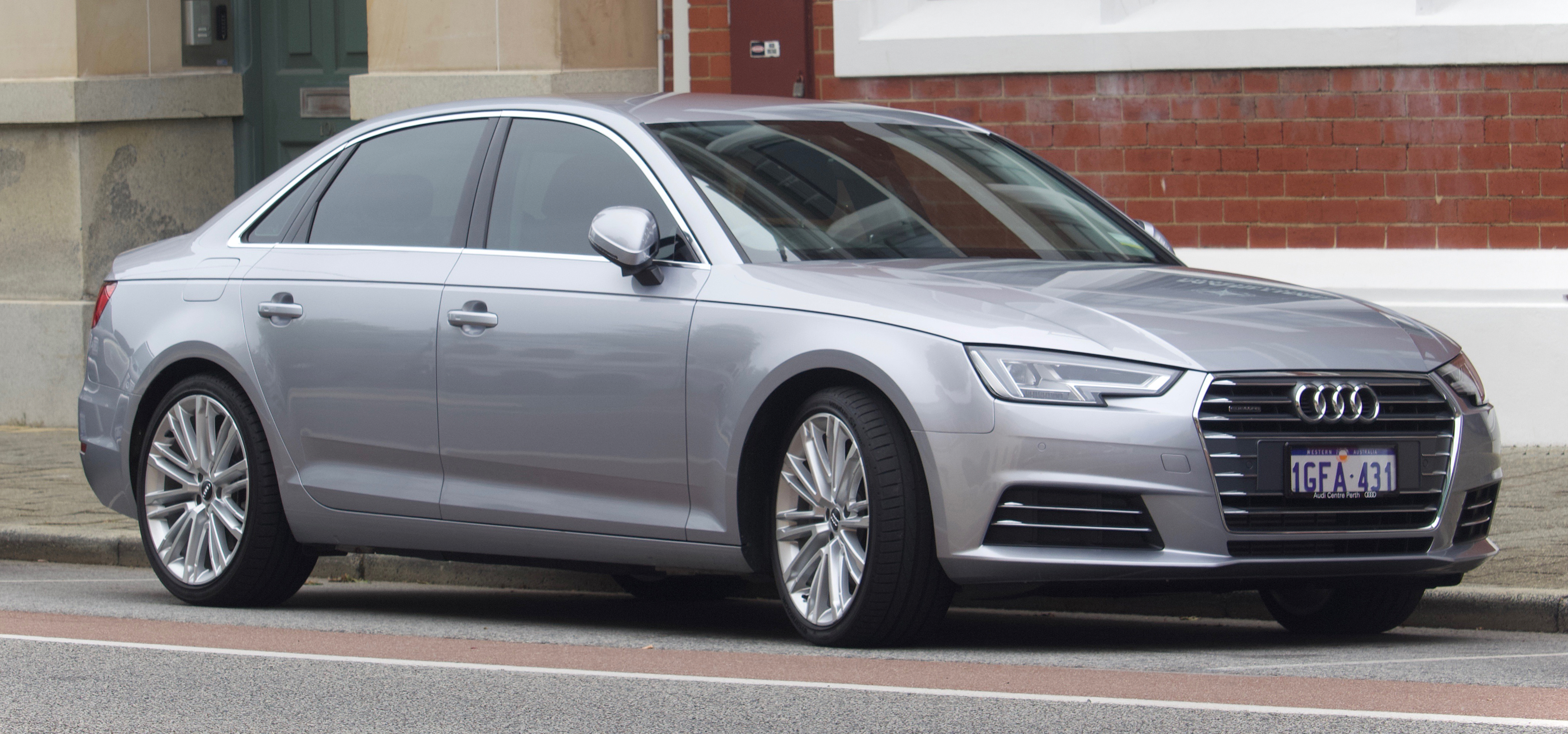
- 2017 Audi A4 sport quattro sedan (pre-facelift)

Overview
- Production: 2015–2025
- Model years: 2016–2025
- Designer: Frank Rimili; Rüdiger Müller (interior); Amar Vaya (facelift)

Body and chassis
- Body style: 4-door saloon/sedan, 5-door Avant (estate/wagon)
- Platform: Volkswagen Group MLB Evo platform
- Related: Audi S4 (B9); Audi RS4 (B9); Audi A5 (F5); Audi Q5 (FY)

Powertrain
- Engine: Inline-four petrol engine: 1.4L TFSI I4; 2.0L TFSI I4; V6 petrol engine: 2.9L V6 TFSI; 3.0L V6 TFSI; Inline-four diesel engine: 2.0L TDI I4; V6 diesel engine: 3.0L V6 TDI
- Transmission: 6-speed manual 7-speed S-tronic; 8-speed Tiptronic

Dimensions
- Wheelbase: 2,820 mm (111.0 in)
- Length: 4,726–4,762 mm (186.1–187.5 in)
- Width: 1,842–1,847 mm (72.5–72.7 in)
- Height: 1,427 mm (56.2 in)

Chronology
- Successor: Audi A5 (B10)

The fifth-generation of the A4 was revealed in June 2015 when pre-production versions were released to the motoring press, with the official launch occurring at the Frankfurt Motor Show in September 2015. It is commonly referred to as the B9, representing the ninth generation of the Audi 80/A4 series, which were originally (but no longer) based on the B platform. The B9 is slightly larger than the outgoing B8, but Audi claims the new A4 is around 120 kg (265 lb) lighter than its predecessor due to the use of its new lightweight aluminum-hybrid construction. The B9 also comes with several A4 firsts such as virtual cockpit, Apple CarPlay and Android Auto, full-color head-up display, and Audi pre-sense.

A common misconception is that the B9 (or 8W) generation started in model year 2017, as that is when the US market got it – however, it was available in European markets beginning in 2015.

=== Trims ===
The Audi A4 launched with three petrol and four diesel engines. US models received only the gasoline versions which consisted of the base 2.0L turbo found in the ultra model, the standard 2.0L turbo in the standard grades, and the V6 engines offered in the S4 and RS4 (3.0L and 2.9L respectively). The Ultra introduced Audi's new high efficiency variant of the EA888 that achieves best in class fuel economy through the use of an increased compression ratio engine (9.6:1 to 11.7:1) with shorter compression and longer-expansion phases. It sends this power through a 7-Speed dual-clutch powering the front wheels only. This allows the A4 to achieve an EPA rating of 27 city/37 highway/31 combined. This variant was only offered until 2020 at which point it was rebranded to the 40 TFSI. Performance figures are shown under the engine variants below.

Available model grades are Premium, Premium Plus, Ultra Premium, Ultra Premium Plus and Prestige. Ultra models featured improved fuel efficiency and reduced emissions, and were only available in the FWD configuration. Every other model was available in either FWD or Quattro. The S Line and Black Optic packages were also made available. The S Line package uses skirts, bumpers, seats and wheels from the Audi S4, and adds an aluminum inlay to the interior consoles. The Black Optic package, or Black Edition, also uses the S4's body kit, but replaces the exterior's chrome trim with black counterparts.

A slight facelift was introduced in 2019, featuring new front and rear bumpers inspired by the Audi RS 4. Additionally, the Titanium model grade was introduced to replace the Ultra Premium and Ultra Premium Plus models.

==== US Launch Editions and Prices ====
2017 Audi A4 Pricing Detail Guide
Model	Trim	Price
A4 Ultra FWD	Premium	$34,900
A4 Ultra FWD	Premium Plus	$38,700
A4 2.0 TFSI	Premium	$37,300
A4 2.0 TFSI	Premium Plus	$41,100
A4 2.0 TFSI	Prestige	$45,900
A4 2.0 TFSI Quattro	Premium	$39,400
A4 2.0 TFSI Quattro	Premium Plus	$43,200
A4 2.0 TFSI Quattro	Prestige	$48,000

=== Facelift (2020–2025) ===
The facelift model, also known as the B9.5, was made available in 2020. It brought the A4's aesthetic in line with the S4, A6, A7 and A8. In addition to redesigned headlights and taillights, almost every body panel on the A4 was altered, with only the hood, trunk and roof remaining untouched. Notably, the character line that ran the length of the A4 was removed, with creases added to the front and rear fenders in its place. While the interior was largely untouched, the mechanical controls for the infotainment center were replaced with a touchscreen and larger display. Following the facelift, the A4 and S4 now share their body panels, with their grilles and badges being the only external distinctions between the models.

Post-facelift, the Titanium model was removed from production, leaving only the Premium, Premium Plus and Prestige model grades. Additionally, US delivered Post-facelift A4's are only available in the Quattro configuration. Whereas front wheel drive continued to be available for the rest of the world. Noting that the B9.5 introduced Quattro-Ultra technology, a system which can disconnect the all wheel drive to save fuel during specific driving conditions, thus negating the disadvantage of Quattro's additional fuel consumption. The Black Optic and S Line packages also return for select models. The Black Optic package can be equipped on any Premium Plus or Prestige Model, while the S Line model can be applied to any Premium Plus or Prestige Model with a 45 TFSI engine. The S Line package makes no changes to the exterior beyond its badging, as the A4 and S4 now share their body kits. It instead provides an aluminum inlay for the interior, improved seats, and stainless steel pedals.

In addition to the above packages, Audi also manufactures aftermarket accessories for the A4, including decals, spoilers, mirror caps and tail pipes.

Audi A4 2025 (Final Year)

The 2025 model year marks the final production year for the Audi A4 nameplate after nearly three decades in the market, with the model being discontinued and replaced by the redesigned Audi A5 as part of the company's restructured naming convention. Under Audi's new nomenclature system, odd-numbered models designate internal combustion engine vehicles while even-numbered models are reserved for electric vehicles. For 2025, Audi streamlined the A4 lineup by eliminating the 40 TFSI trim level, leaving only the 45 TFSI variant with a 261-horsepower turbocharged 2.0-liter four-cylinder engine paired with a 12-volt mild hybrid system.

Updates for the final model year include remote engine start via the myAudi app as standard equipment across all trims, and HomeLink smart home control buttons relocated to the rearview mirror. The Premium Plus trim received Audi's Navigation Plus package as standard equipment, while the Convenience package for the Premium trim added rear USB charge ports. A new S Line Plus package became available for Premium Plus and Prestige trims, featuring black exterior trim, dark exhaust tips, 19-inch wheels, red brake calipers, leather-and-faux-suede seats, carbon fiber interior trim, and stainless-steel pedal caps.

All 2025 A4 models come standard with Audi's quattro all-wheel drive system and a seven-speed dual-clutch automatic transmission. The infotainment system features a 10.1-inch touchscreen, with the Premium Plus trim offering an upgraded Bang & Olufsen audio system with 19 speakers and Audi's Virtual Cockpit digital gauge display. Three trim levels are offered: Premium S line starting at $44,100, Premium Plus S line at $48,600, and Prestige S line at $51,300. The A4 allroad wagon variant continues for 2025 with a 2.0-liter turbocharged four-cylinder engine producing 261-horsepower and 273 lb-ft of torque, featuring standard adaptive damping suspension and Audi drive select system.

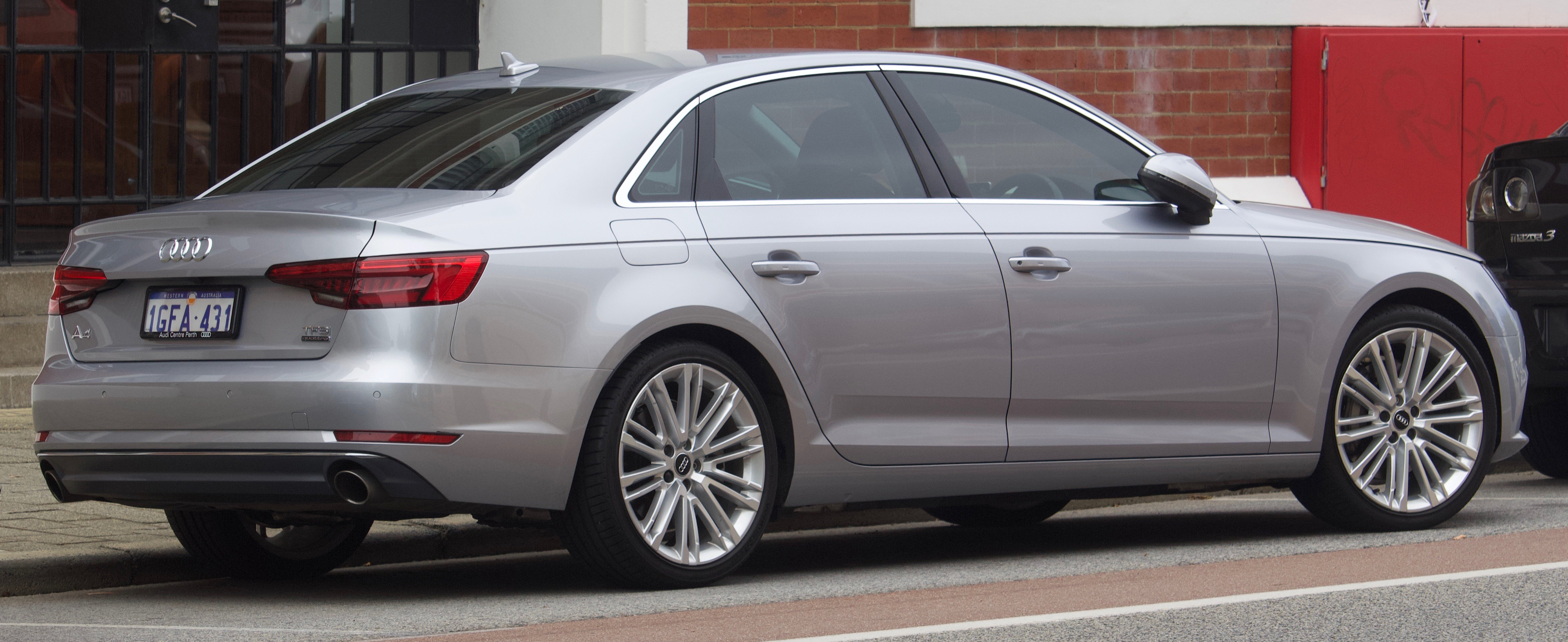
Sedan / Saloon

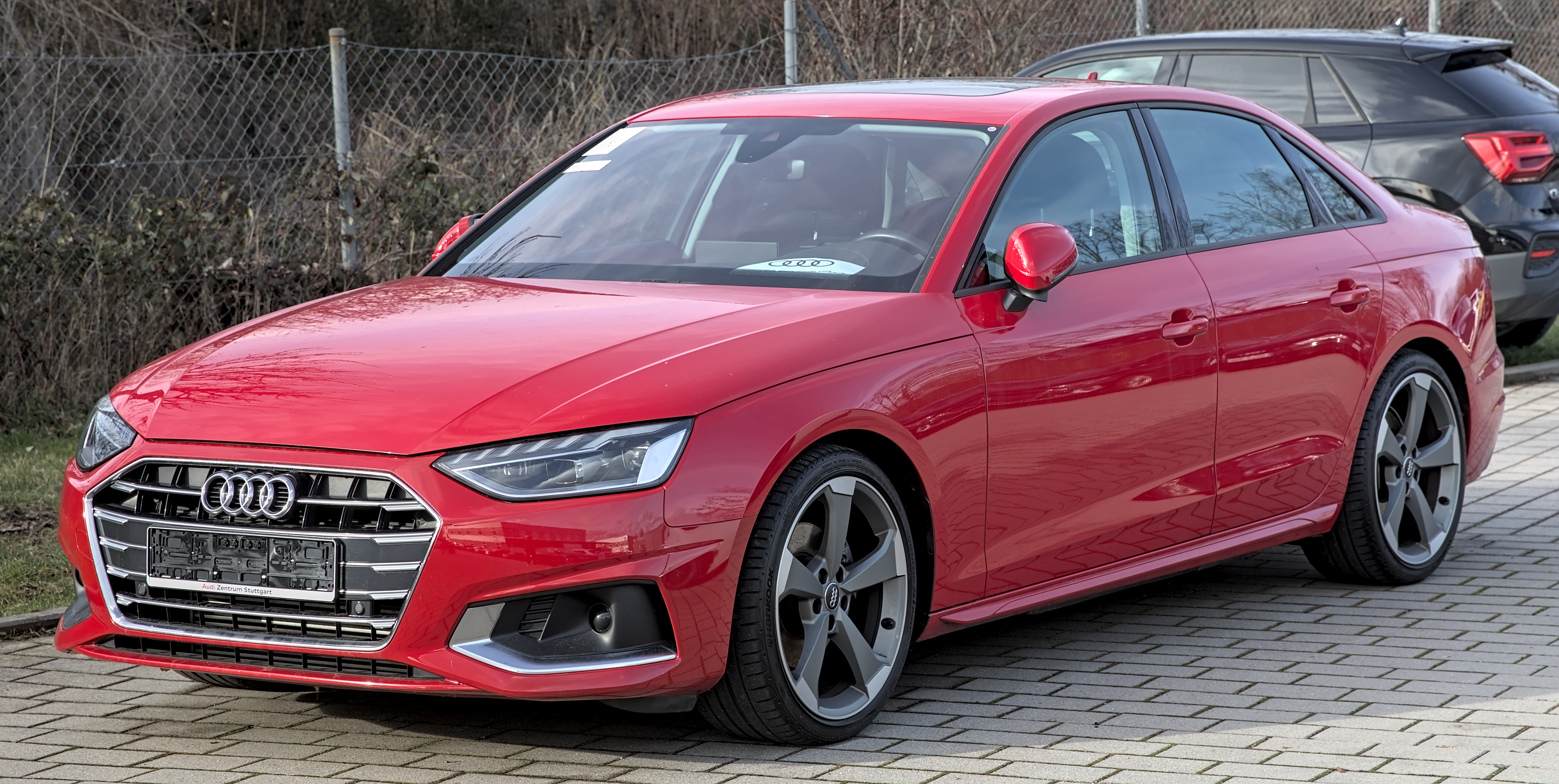
Sedan / Saloon (facelift)

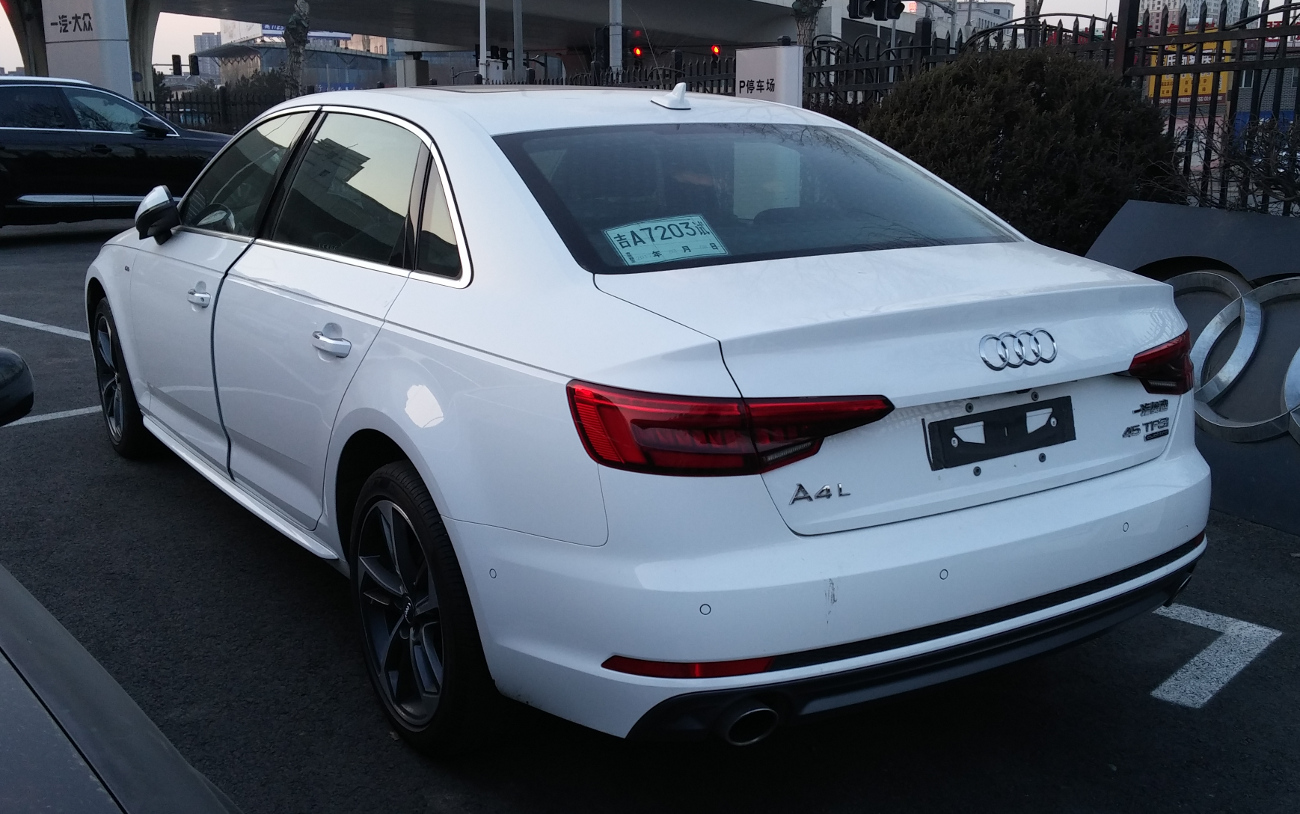
A4L

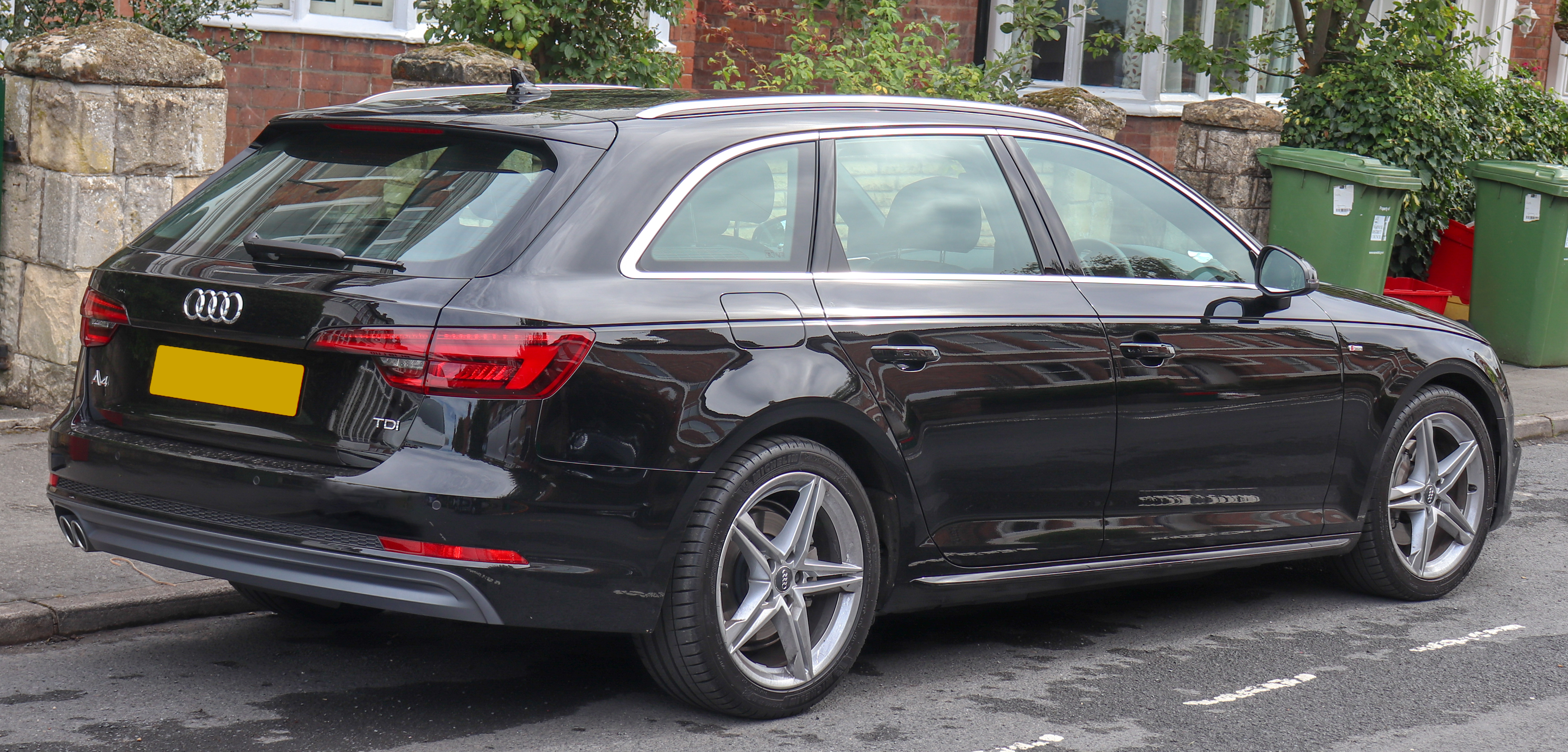
Avant

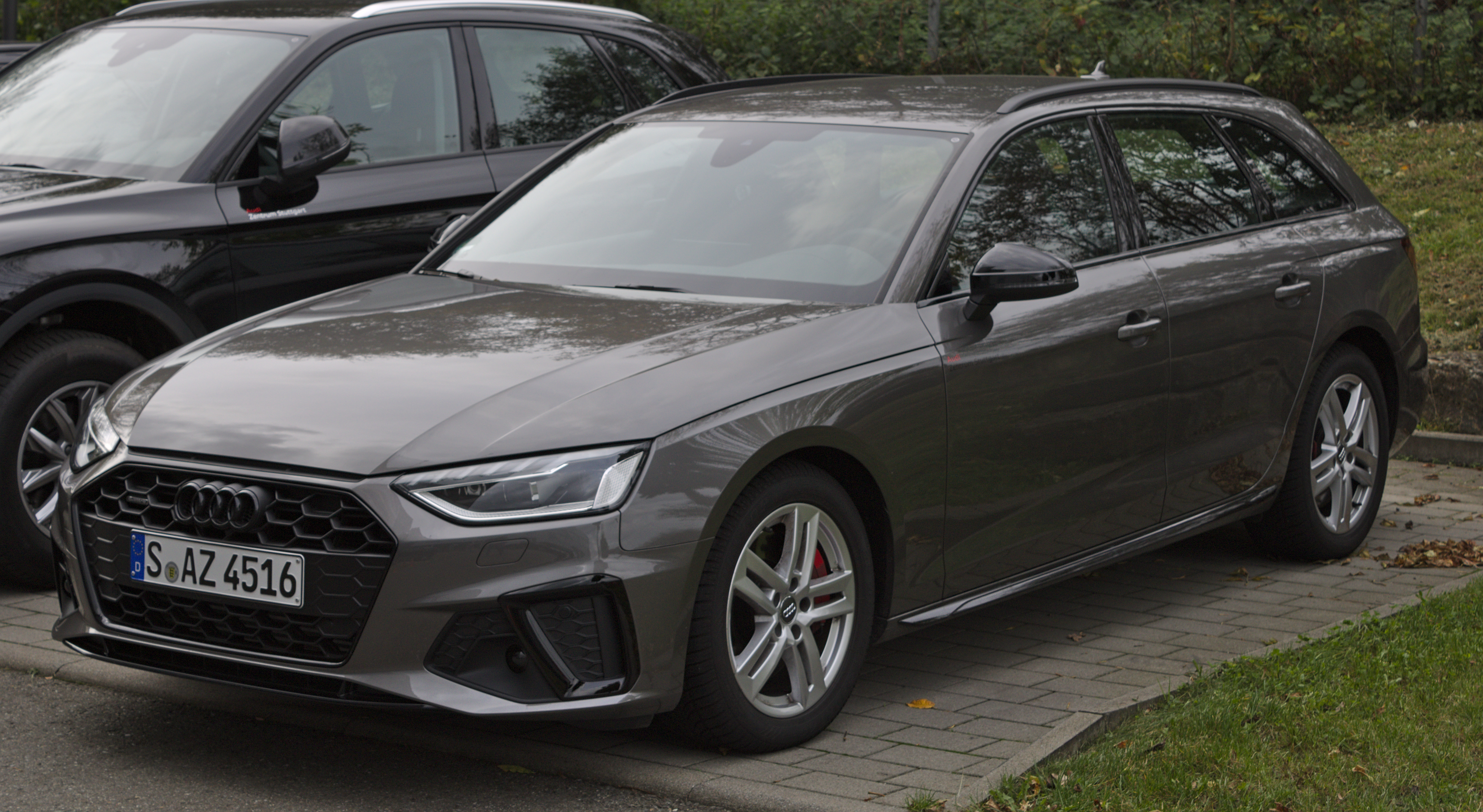
Avant (facelift)

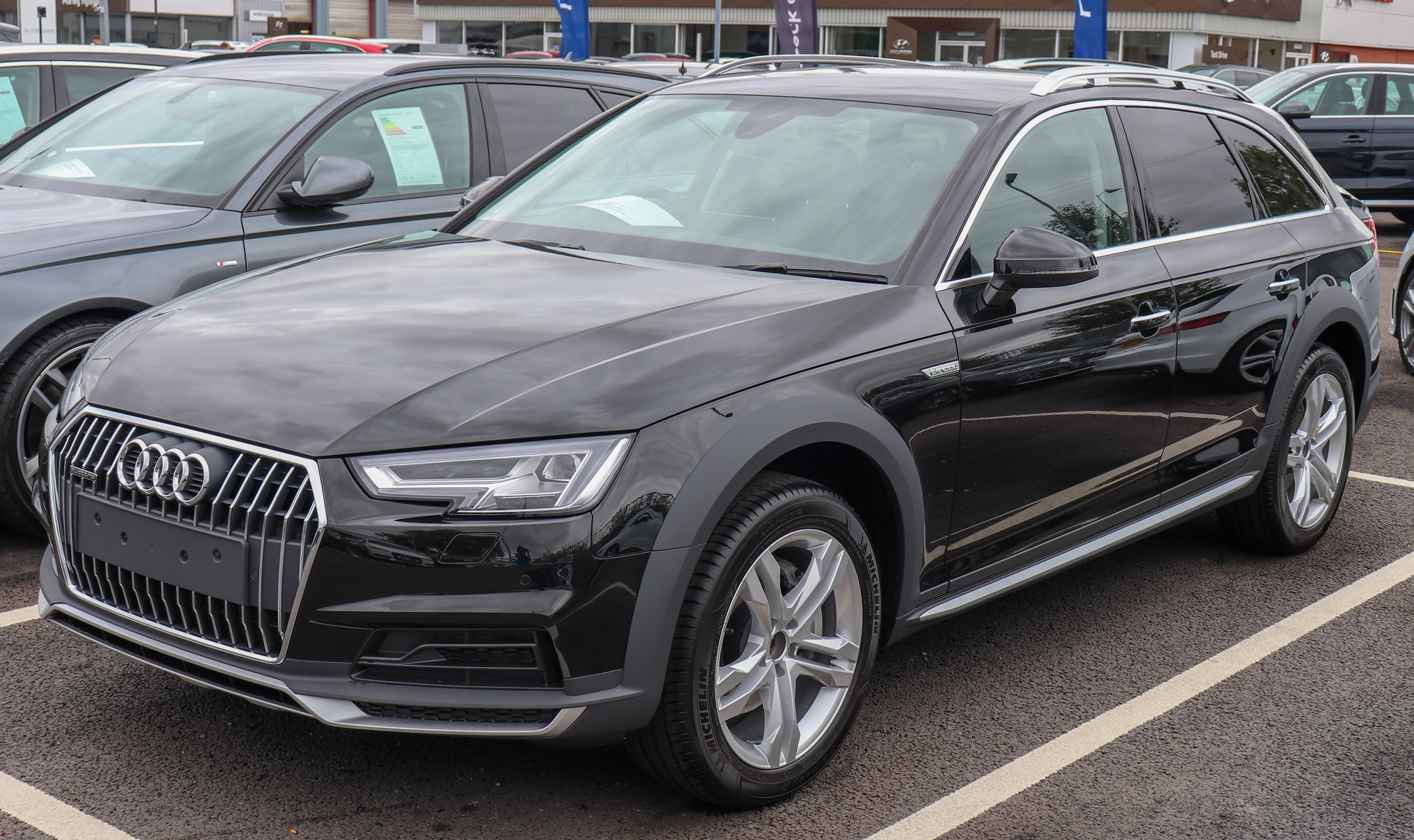
Allroad quattro (front)

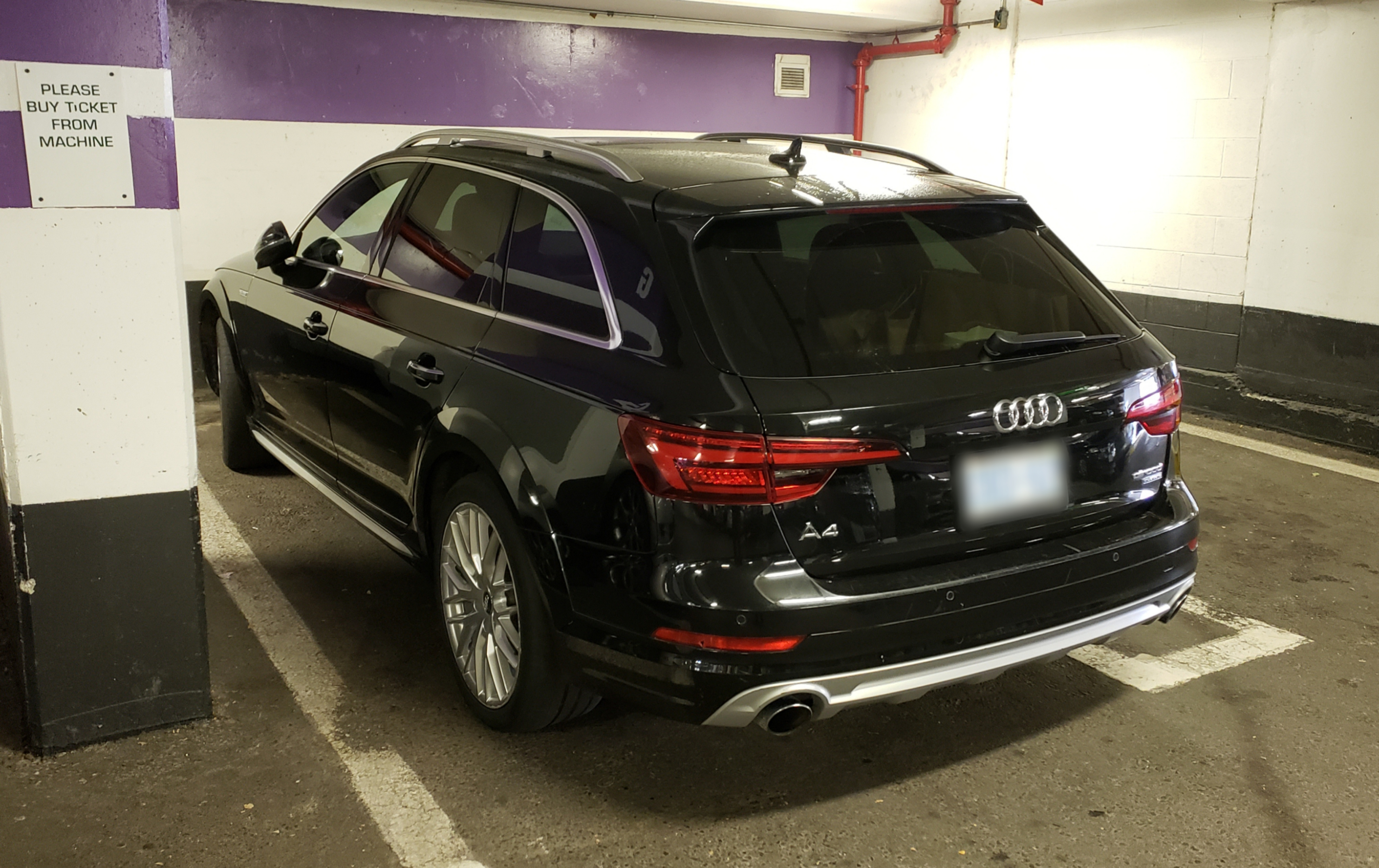
Allroad Quattro (rear)

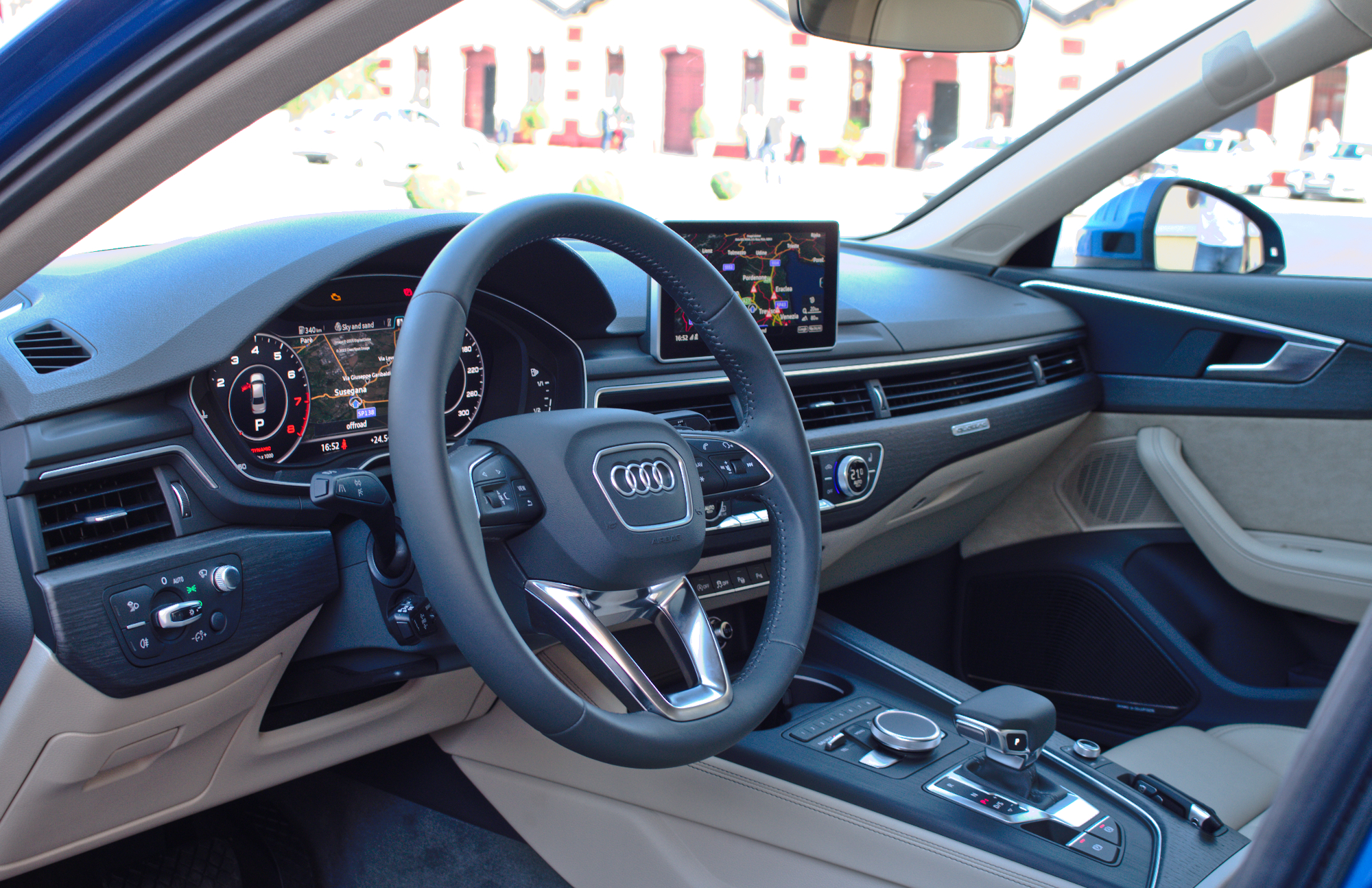
Interior

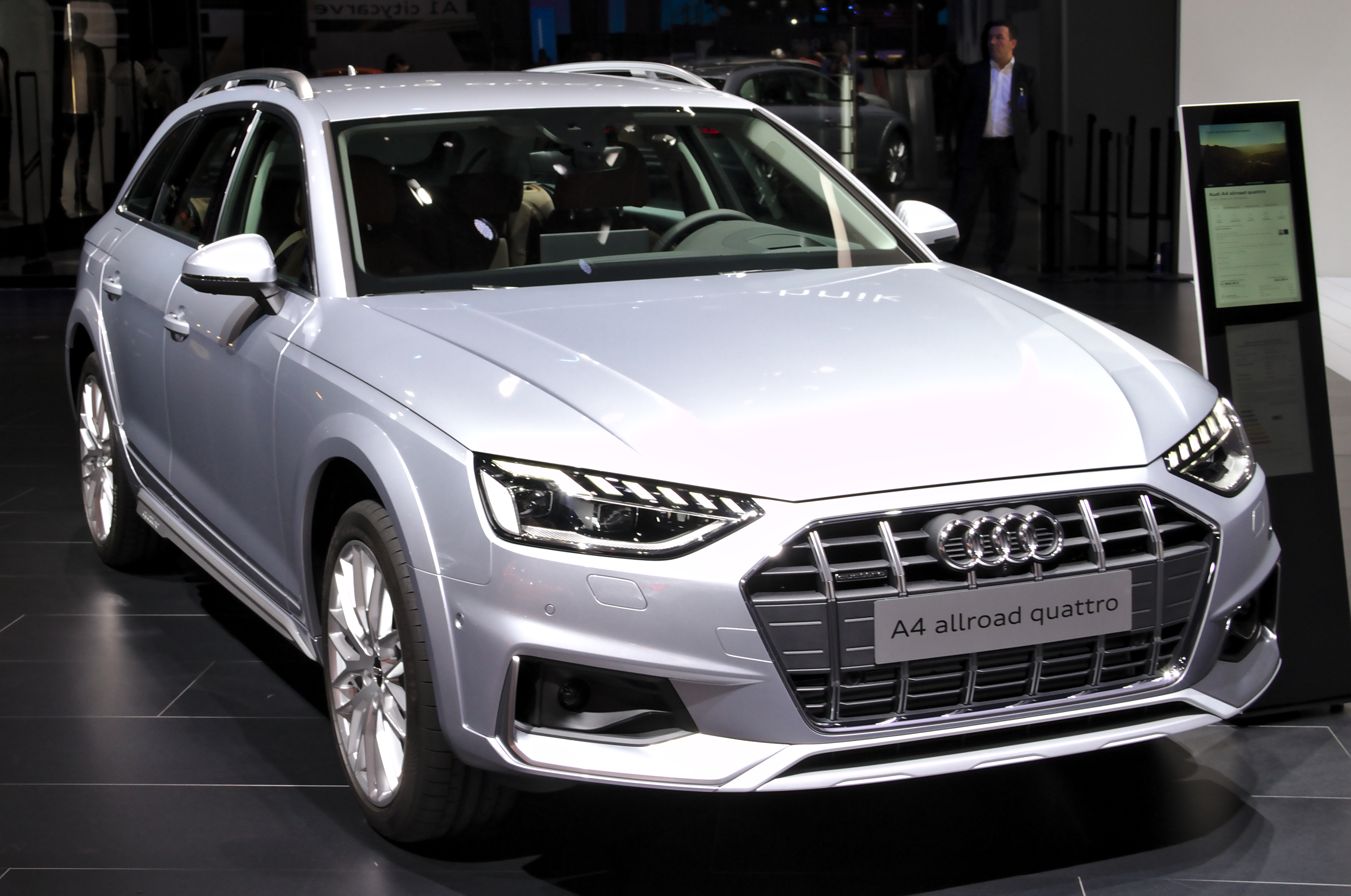
Allroad quattro (facelift)

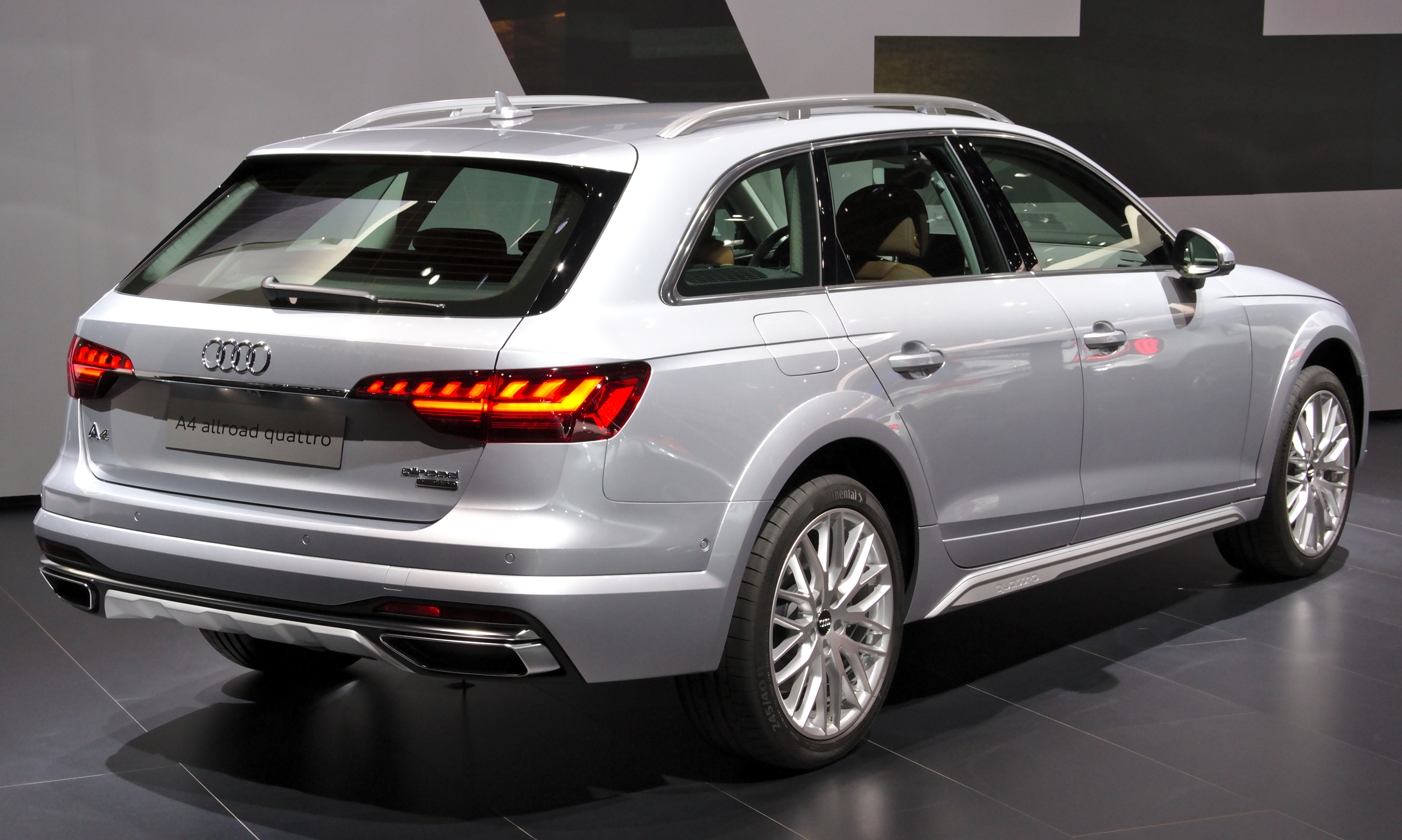
Allroad quattro (facelift)

=== Engines ===
Seven engines are available from launch, three petrol, and four diesel. All are available in both the A4 Saloon and A4 Avant. The figures below are for the saloon only.

Engine type	Max. power	Max. torque	0–100 km/h (62 mph)	Top speed	CO_{2} emissions	Fuel consumption (combined)
Petrol engines
1.4 TFSI / 2.0 TFSI (35 TFSI)	150 PS (110 kW; 148 bhp)	250 N⋅m (184 lb⋅ft) at 1500–3500 rpm	8.5 s	210 km/h (130 mph)	131 g/km	5.5 L/100 km (51 mpg_{‑imp}; 43 mpg_{‑US})
2.0 TFSI ultra (40 TFSI / 40 TFSI quattro)	190 PS (140 kW; 187 bhp)	320 N⋅m (236 lb⋅ft) at 1450-4200 rpm	7.2 s	240 km/h (149 mph)	124 g/km	5.5 L/100 km (51 mpg_{‑imp}; 43 mpg_{‑US})
2.0 TFSI (45 TFSI / 45 TFSI quattro)	252 PS (185 kW; 249 bhp)	370 N⋅m (273 lb⋅ft) at 1600–4500 rpm	5.2 s	250 km/h (155 mph)	137 g/km	5.9 L/100 km (48 mpg_{‑imp}; 40 mpg_{‑US})
3.0 V6 TFSI (S4)	354 PS (260 kW; 349 bhp)	500 N⋅m (369 lb⋅ft) at 1370-4500 rpm	4.4 s	250 km/h (155 mph)	170 g/km	7.5 L/100 km (38 mpg_{‑imp}; 31 mpg_{‑US})
2.9 V6 TFSI (RS4)	450 PS (331 kW; 444 bhp)	600 N⋅m (443 lb⋅ft) at 1900–5000 rpm	4.1 s	250 km/h (155 mph)	200 g/km	8.8 L/100 km (32 mpg_{‑imp}; 27 mpg_{‑US})
Diesel engines
2.0 TDI (30 TDI)	136 PS (100 kW; 134 bhp)	320 N⋅m (236 lb⋅ft) at 1500–3000 rpm	9.2 s	210 km/h (130 mph)	111 g/km 98 g/km	4.2 L/100 km (67 mpg_{‑imp}; 56 mpg_{‑US}); 3.8 L/100 km (74 mpg_{‑imp}; 62 mpg_{‑US})
2.0 TDI (35 TDI)	150 PS (110 kW; 148 bhp)	320 N⋅m (236 lb⋅ft) at 1500–3250 rpm	8.9 s	221 km/h (137 mph); 210 km/h (130 mph)	111 g/km 99 g/km	4.2 L/100 km (67 mpg_{‑imp}; 56 mpg_{‑US}); 3.8 L/100 km (74 mpg_{‑imp}; 62 mpg_{‑US})
2.0 TDI ultra (40 TDI/ 40 TDI quattro)	190 PS (140 kW; 187 bhp)	400 N⋅m (295 lb⋅ft) at 1750-3000 rpm	7.7 s	240 km/h (149 mph); 210 km/h (130 mph)	118 g/km 102 g/km	4.5 L/100 km (63 mpg_{‑imp}; 52 mpg_{‑US}); 3.9 L/100 km (72 mpg_{‑imp}; 60 mpg_{‑US})
3.0 TDI V6 (45 TDI)	218 PS (160 kW; 215 bhp)	500 N⋅m (369 lb⋅ft) at 1250-3750 rpm	6.6 s	250 km/h (155 mph)	117 g/km	4.5 L/100 km (63 mpg_{‑imp}; 52 mpg_{‑US})
3.0 TDI V6 quattro (50 TDI)	272 PS (200 kW; 268 bhp)	600 N⋅m (443 lb⋅ft) at 1500–3000 rpm	5.3 s	250 km/h (155 mph)	137 g/km	5.2 L/100 km (54 mpg_{‑imp}; 45 mpg_{‑US})
3.0 TDI V6 quattro (S4 TDI)	347 PS (255 kW; 342 bhp)	700 N⋅m (516 lb⋅ft) at 1500–3000 rpm	4.7 s	250 km/h (155 mph)	193 g/km	7.4 L/100 km (38 mpg_{‑imp}; 32 mpg_{‑US})

=== Safety ===
==== ANCAP ====
ANCAP test results Audi A4 all variants with 4 cylinder engines (2015, aligned with Euro NCAP)
Test	Points	%
Overall:	5 /5 stars	
Adult occupant:	34.5	90%
Child occupant:	43	87%
Pedestrian:	27.3	75%
Safety assist:	9.9	75%

==== IIHS ====
The 2017 Audi A4 earned Good ratings across the board for Crashworthiness and Seat belts & child restraints. For Crash avoidance & mitigation it earned a Marginal to Acceptable for headlights depending on trim as well as Goods across the board for Front crash prevention vehicle-to-vehicle. These ratings apply to the full B9 A4 line and the mechanically similar A5 Sportback.

Top Safety Pick Plus Award Winner
2017 Audi A4 Saloon	Rating
Small overlap front: driver-side	G
Small overlap front: passenger-side	G
Moderate overlap front: original test	G
Side: original test	G
Roof strength	G
Head restraints & seats	G

==== EURO NCAP ====
The Audi A4 released to Europe in 2015 for the 2016 model year. It earned a 5-Star Rating for all A4s, A5 Coupes, and A5 Sportbacks. These ratings were valid through January 2022 at which point they expire.

EURO NCAP Large Family Car
2015 Audi A4 Saloon	Rating
Overall Rating	5/5 Stars
Adult Occupant	89%
Child Occupant	87%
Pedestrian	75%
Safety Assist	75%

=== Awards ===
- Cars.com 2018 Luxury Car of the Year
- 2016 Best Premium Car - Fleet News
- Japan Car of the Year Award (Import Category - 2016)
- Kelly Blue Book Best Buy Award 2017
- Motor Trend Car of the Year finalist 2017
- What Car? Car of the Year 2016

== Production ==
Year	A4	A4 Cabriolet
1994		-
1995		-
1996		-
1997	283,522	-
1998	265,421	-
1999	248,428	-
2000	229,558	-
2001	309,151	-
2002	339,562	20,705
2003	324,551	29,285
2004	313,269	31,962
2005	315,606	22,089
2006	312,786	28,324
2007	289,806	24,341
2008	361,894	16,991
2009	279,624	2,409
2010	306,291	-
2011	321,045	-
2012	329,759	-
2013	338,449	-
2014	328,465	-
2015	318,788	-
2016	357,999	-
2017	325,307	-
2018	344,623	-
2019	323,387	-
2020	243,566	-
2021	199,628	-
2022	234,395	-
2023	237,830	-

Year	China				
Year	A4	A4L	S4	RS4	Total
2023	2,104	130,207	3,092	306	135,709
2024	2,142	110,139	2,432	233	114,946
2025	264	79,630	1,336	210	81,440

== Motorsport ==
=== A4 DTM ===
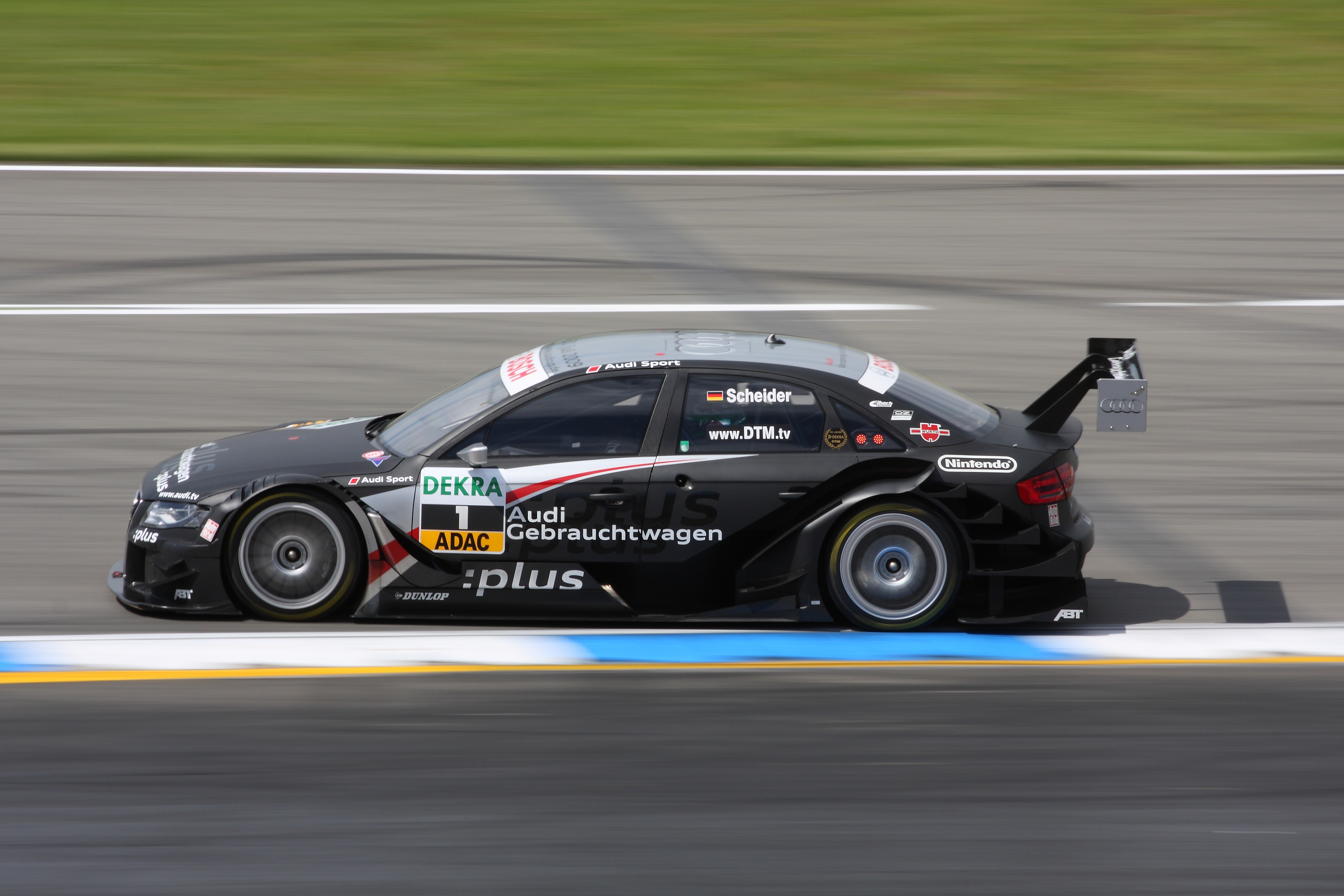
Timo Scheider driving an Audi A4 DTM 2009 (R14 plus) at the Hockenheimring.

Audi Sport re-entered the Deutsche Tourenwagen Masters (DTM) series in 2004 (after having privateer teams run the Abt Sportsline Audi TT-R) with a V8 engined silhouette racing car resembling the A4 saloon, known as the Audi A4 DTM. A4 DTM cars are identified by Audi Sport "R"-prefix designations.

=== Australian Super Touring Championship ===
Brad Jones won the Australian Super Touring Championship in both 1996 and 1998 driving an A4.

=== BTCC ===
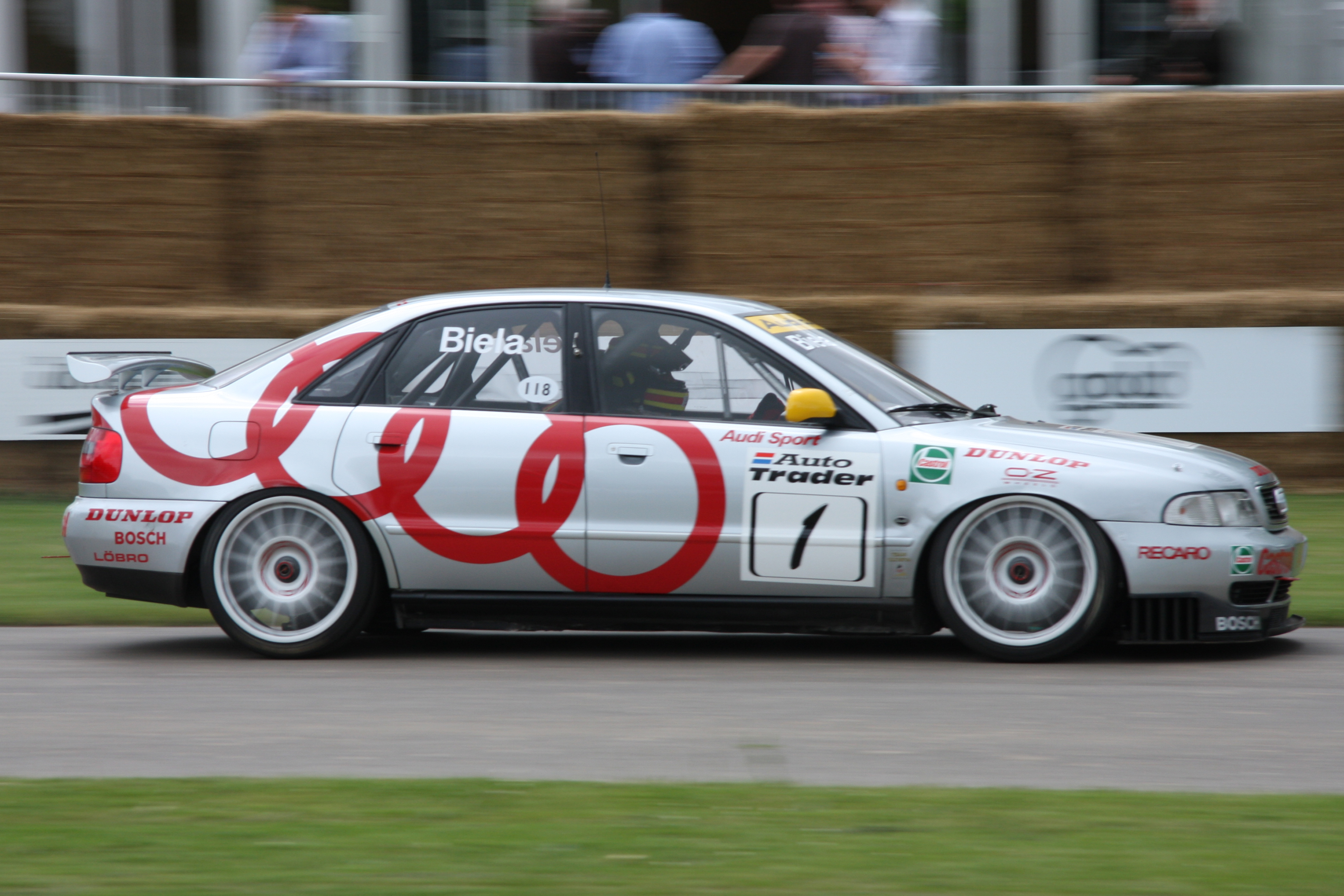
Frank Biela won the 1996 British Touring Car Championship driving an A4

The A4 was used in the 1996–1998 and 2011–2015 British Touring Car Championship seasons.

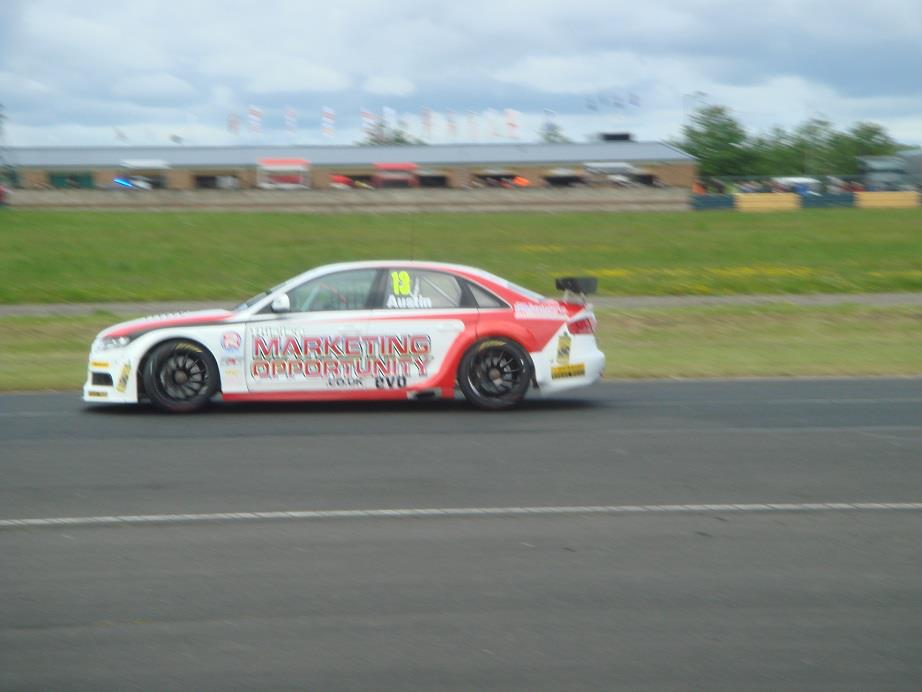
Rob Austin's 2012 BTCC Audi A4

=== ETCC ===
The A4 was used in the 2000–2001 European Super Touring Championship season.

=== Italian touring cars ===
A4 drivers won the Italian Superturismo Championship in 1995 and 1996.

=== STCC ===
Drivers in an A4 won 2001, 2002, 2003, and the 2006 Swedish Touring Car Championship season.

=== STW ===
The A4 was entered into the 1995 Super Tourenwagen Cup season.

=== RTCC ===
The car was used in the 2006 Russian Circuit Racing Series.

=== SCCA ===
The A4 was used in the SCCA World Challenge for several years.

== Renaming ==
In March 2023, Audi CEO Markus Duesmann did confirm that the A4 would be renamed the A5, while the A6 would become the A7, with the future A4 and A6 to be sold as electric vehicles only.

== See also ==
- Volkswagen Group China
