= 2005 Supercheap Auto 1000 =

Motor race in Australia

Seasons
- ← 2004 2006 →

(New South Wales) 2005 Supercheap Auto
Event Information
- Round 10 of 13 in the 2005 V8 Supercar Championship Series
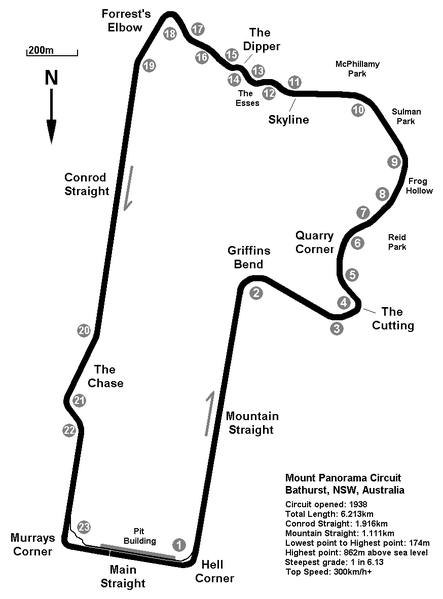
- Date: 6–9 October 2005
- Location: Bathurst, New South Wales
- Venue: Mount Panorama Circuit
- Weather: Overcast

Results
Race 1
Distance	161 laps	1000 km
Pole position	(Australia) Craig Lowndes; Triple Eight Race Engineering	2:08.5990
Winner	(Australia) Mark Skaife (Australia) Todd Kelly; Holden Racing Team	6:37:17.0012
Round Results
First	(Australia) Mark Skaife (Australia) Todd Kelly; Holden Racing Team	192 pts
Second	(New Zealand) Jason Richards (Australia) Jamie Whincup; Tasman Motorsport	188 pts
Third	(Australia) Steven Ellery (Australia) Adam Macrow; Triple Eight Race Engineering	184 pts

The 2005 Supercheap Auto 1000 was an endurance motor race for V8 Supercars. The race was held on 9 October 2005 at the Mount Panorama Circuit just outside Bathurst in New South Wales, Australia and was Round 10 of the 2005 V8 Supercar Championship Series. It was the ninth running of the Australia 1000 race, first held after the organisational split over the Bathurst 1000 that occurred in 1997. It was the 48th in a sequence of endurance races which commenced with the 1960 Armstrong 500 held at Phillip Island and 2005 was the 43rd year in which these races had been run at the Mount Panorama Circuit. It was also the first to be run under new naming rights sponsor, Australian automotive retail chain Super Cheap Auto.

The race was won by Mark Skaife and Todd Kelly of the Holden Racing Team. It was the seventh consecutive win by a Holden, the longest such streak in the combined history of the Bathurst 1000. It was the Holden Racing Team's fifth Bathurst victory and Skaife's fifth win as well. Kelly followed his younger brother Rick as a Bathurst winner, becoming the 50th driver to claim victory.

Skaife took the lead with 20 laps to go over the Tasman Motorsport Commodore of Jason Richards.

Greg Murphy and Marcos Ambrose came in contact at the Cutting with 16 laps to go. The two drivers argued heatedly after the collision.

== Entry list ==
No.	Drivers	Team (Sponsor)	Car	No.	Drivers	Team (Sponsor)	Car
1	(Australia) Marcos Ambrose (Australia) Warren Luff	Stone Brothers Racing (Pirtek)	Ford Falcon BA	21	(Australia) John Bowe (Australia) Brad Jones	Brad Jones Racing (BOC Gas and Gear)	Ford Falcon BA
2	(Australia) Mark Skaife (Australia) Todd Kelly	Holden Racing Team (Holden, Mobil 1)	Holden Commodore VZ	22	(New Zealand) Jim Richards (Australia) James Courtney	Holden Racing Team (Holden, Mobil 1)	Holden Commodore VZ
3	(New Zealand) Jason Richards (Australia) Jamie Whincup	Tasman Motorsport (Dodo)	Holden Commodore VZ	23	(New Zealand) Fabian Coulthard (Australia) Tony D'Alberto	Tasman Motorsport (Dodo)	Holden Commodore VZ
5	(Australia) Greg Ritter (Australia) Cameron McLean	Ford Performance Racing (OzJet, FPV, Ford Credit)	Ford Falcon BA	24	(New Zealand) Steven Richards (Australia) Paul Dumbrell	Perkins Engineering (Castrol Formula R)	Holden Commodore VZ
6	(Australia) Jason Bright (Australia) David Brabham	Ford Performance Racing (Caterpillar)	Ford Falcon BA	25	(Australia) Steve Owen (Australia) Matthew White	Britek Motorsport (Fujitsu)	Ford Falcon BA
7	(Australia) Alex Davison (Denmark) Allan Simonsen	Rod Nash Racing (Autobarn)	Holden Commodore VZ	33	(Australia) Phillip Scifleet (Australia) Lee Holdsworth	Garry Rogers Motorsport (Valvoline, Repco)	Holden Commodore VZ
8	(Australia) Marcus Marshall (Canada) Alex Tagliani	WPS Racing (Team Australia)	Ford Falcon BA	34	(Australia) Cameron McConville (Australia) Andrew Jones	Garry Rogers Motorsport (Valvoline, Repco)	Holden Commodore VZ
9	(Australia) Russell Ingall (Australia) Luke Youlden	Stone Brothers Racing (Caltex)	Ford Falcon BA	44	(Brazil) Max Wilson (Australia) Tony Longhurst	Team Dynamik (WOW Sight & Sound)	Holden Commodore VZ
10	(Switzerland) Alain Menu (New Zealand) Matthew Halliday	Larkham Motor Sport (Orrcon Steel)	Ford Falcon BA	45	(New Zealand) Mark Porter (New Zealand) Kayne Scott	Team Dynamik (WOW Sight & Sound)	Holden Commodore VZ
11	(Australia) Matthew Coleman (Australia) Christian D'Agostin	Perkins Engineering (Castrol Formula R)	Holden Commodore VZ	48	(New Zealand) Craig Baird (Australia) David Besnard	WPS Racing (WPS Financial Services)	Ford Falcon BA
12	(United Kingdom) John Cleland (Australia) Dale Brede	Brad Jones Racing (BOC Gas and Gear)	Ford Falcon BA	50	(Australia) Owen Kelly (Australia) Nathan Pretty	Paul Weel Racing (Supercheap Auto)	Holden Commodore VZ
15	(Australia) Tim Leahey (Australia) Mark Noske	HSV Dealer Team (Holden Special Vehicles)	Holden Commodore VZ	51	(New Zealand) Greg Murphy (Australia) Paul Weel	Paul Weel Racing (Supercheap Auto)	Holden Commodore VZ
16	(Australia) Garth Tander (Australia) Rick Kelly	HSV Dealer Team (Holden Special Vehicles)	Holden Commodore VZ	52	(Australia) José Fernández (Australia) Damien White	Britek Motorsport (Fujitsu)	Ford Falcon BA
17	(Australia) Steven Johnson (Australia) Will Davison	Dick Johnson Racing (Westpoint)	Ford Falcon BA	67	(Australia) Paul Morris (New Zealand) Paul Radisich	Paul Morris Motorsport (Sirromet Wines, TKR)	Holden Commodore VZ
18	(Australia) Glenn Seton (Australia) Dean Canto	Dick Johnson Racing (Westpoint)	Ford Falcon BA	75	(Australia) Anthony Tratt (Australia) Tony Evangelou	Paul Little Racing (Toll)	Holden Commodore VY
20	(Australia) Jason Bargwanna (Australia) Mark Winterbottom	Larkham Motor Sport (Orrcon Steel)	Ford Falcon BA	88	(Australia) Steve Ellery (Australia) Adam Macrow	Triple Eight Race Engineering (Betta Electrical)	Ford Falcon BA
021	(New Zealand) John Faulkner (Australia) Alan Gurr	Team Kiwi Racing (Team Kiwi Racing, Sirromet Wines)	Holden Commodore VZ	888	(Australia) Craig Lowndes (France) Yvan Muller	Triple Eight Race Engineering (Betta Electrical)	Ford Falcon BA

== Qualifying ==
=== Qualifying ===
Pos.	No.	Driver	Team	Car	Time	Gap	Grid
1	888	(Australia) Craig Lowndes	Triple Eight Race Engineering	Ford Falcon BA	2:07.1322		Top 10
2	2	(Australia) Mark Skaife	Holden Racing Team	Holden Commodore VZ	2:07.5333	+0.4011	Top 10
3	1	(Australia) Marcos Ambrose	Stone Brothers Racing	Ford Falcon BA	2:07.7357	+0.6035	Top 10
4	16	(Australia) Garth Tander	HSV Dealer Team	Holden Commodore VZ	2:07.7622	+0.6300	Top 10
5	51	(New Zealand) Greg Murphy	Paul Weel Racing	Holden Commodore VZ	2:07.8709	+0.7387	Top 10
6	24	(New Zealand) Steven Richards	Perkins Engineering	Holden Commodore VY	2:07.9291	+0.7969	Top 10
7	3	(New Zealand) Jason Richards	Tasman Motorsport	Holden Commodore VZ	2:08.1325	+1.0003	Top 10
8	9	(Australia) Russell Ingall	Stone Brothers Racing	Ford Falcon BA	2:08.2643	+1.1321	Top 10
9	18	(Australia) Glenn Seton	Dick Johnson Racing	Ford Falcon BA	2:08.3326	+1.2004	Top 10
10	22	(New Zealand) Jim Richards	Holden Racing Team	Holden Commodore VZ	2:08.4261	+1.2939	Top 10
11	34	(Australia) Cameron McConville	Garry Rogers Motorsport	Holden Commodore VZ	2:08.7164	+1.5842	11
12	6	(Australia) Jason Bright	Ford Performance Racing	Ford Falcon BA	2:08.7959	+1.6637	12
13	5	(Australia) Greg Ritter	Ford Performance Racing	Ford Falcon BA	2:08.8407	+1.7085	13
14	25	(Australia) Steve Owen	Britek Motorsport	Ford Falcon BA	2:08.9035	+1.7713	14
15	17	(Australia) Steven Johnson	Dick Johnson Racing	Ford Falcon BA	2:08.9035	+1.7865	15
16	88	(Australia) Steven Ellery	Triple Eight Race Engineering	Ford Falcon BA	2:08.9688	+1.8366	16
17	20	(Australia) Jason Bargwanna	Larkham Motor Sport	Ford Falcon BA	2:08.9762	+1.8440	17
18	44	(Brazil) Max Wilson	Team Dynamik	Holden Commodore VZ	2:09.1330	+2.0008	18
19	48	(Australia) David Besnard	WPS Racing	Ford Falcon BA	2:09.1772	+2.0450	19
20	67	(Australia) Paul Morris	Paul Morris Motorsport	Holden Commodore VZ	2:09.2243	+2.0921	20
21	15	(Australia) Mark Noske	HSV Dealer Team	Holden Commodore VZ	2:09.3515	+2.2193	21
22	10	(Switzerland) Alain Menu	Larkham Motor Sport	Ford Falcon BA	2:09.6180	+2.4858	22
23	7	(Australia) Alex Davison	Perkins Engineering	Holden Commodore VZ	2:09.7065	+2.5743	23
24	75	(Australia) Anthony Tratt	Paul Little Racing	Holden Commodore VY	2:09.9967	+2.8645	24
25	23	(Australia) Tony D'Alberto	Tasman Motorsport	Holden Commodore VZ	2:10.3515	+3.2193	25
26	21	(Australia) John Bowe	Brad Jones Racing	Ford Falcon BA	2:10.4709	+3.3387	26
27	021	(Australia) Alan Gurr	Team Kiwi Racing	Holden Commodore VZ	2:10.5187	+3.3865	27
28	33	(Australia) Lee Holdsworth	Garry Rogers Motorsport	Holden Commodore VZ	2:10.6179	+3.4857	28
29	12	(United Kingdom) John Cleland	Brad Jones Racing	Ford Falcon BA	2:10.7695	+3.6373	29
30	45	(New Zealand) Mark Porter	Team Dynamik	Holden Commodore VZ	2:11.3887	+4.2565	30
31	11	(Australia) Christian D'Agostin	Perkins Engineering	Holden Commodore VY	2:11.4367	+4.3045	31
32	52	(Australia) José Fernández	Britek Motorsport	Ford Falcon BA	2:13.8347	+6.7025	32
33	50	(Australia) Owen Kelly	Paul Weel Racing	Holden Commodore VZ	2:18.8718	+11.7396	33
EXC	8	(Australia) Marcus Marshall	WPS Racing	Ford Falcon BA	EXC		34

=== Top Ten Shootout ===
The fastest ten cars from Qualifying contested a single lap shootout to determine the first ten grid positions for the race.

Pos.	No.	Team	Driver	Car	Time
1	888	Triple Eight Race Engineering	(Australia) Craig Lowndes	Ford Falcon BA	2:08.5990
2	1	Stone Brothers Racing	(Australia) Marcos Ambrose	Ford Falcon BA	2:08.8571
3	51	Paul Weel Racing	(New Zealand) Greg Murphy	Holden Commodore VZ	2:09.1834
4	2	Holden Racing Team	(Australia) Mark Skaife	Holden Commodore VZ	2:09.3787
5	16	HSV Dealer Team	(Australia) Garth Tander	Holden Commodore VZ	2:09.6648
6	24	Perkins Engineering	(New Zealand) Steven Richards	Holden Commodore VY	2:09.8170
7	3	Tasman Motorsport	(New Zealand) Jason Richards	Holden Commodore VZ	2:12.2092
8	18	Dick Johnson Racing	(Australia) Glenn Seton	Ford Falcon BA	2:19.6014
9	22	Holden Racing Team	(New Zealand) Jim Richards	Holden Commodore VZ	2:20.1202
10	9	Stone Brothers Racing	(Australia) Russell Ingall	Ford Falcon BA	DNF

=== Starting grid ===
The following table represents the final starting grid for the race on Sunday:

Inside row					Outside row				
1	(Australia) Craig Lowndes (France) Yvan Muller	888			1	(Australia) Marcos Ambrose (Australia) Warren Luff			2
1	Triple Eight Race Engineering (Ford Falcon BA)				Stone Brothers Racing (Ford Falcon BA)				2
3			(New Zealand) Greg Murphy (Australia) Paul Weel	51			2	(Australia) Mark Skaife (Australia) Todd Kelly	4
3			Paul Weel Racing (Holden Commodore VZ)				Holden Racing Team (Holden Commodore VZ)		4
5	(Australia) Garth Tander (Australia) Rick Kelly	16			24	(New Zealand) Steven Richards (Australia) Paul Dumbrell			6
5	HSV Dealer Team (Holden Commodore VZ)				Perkins Engineering (Holden Commodore VY)				6
7			(New Zealand) Jason Richards (Australia) Jamie Whincup	3			18	(Australia) Glenn Seton (Australia) Dean Canto	8
7			Tasman Motorsport (Holden Commodore VZ)				Dick Johnson Racing (Ford Falcon BA)		8
9	(New Zealand) Jim Richards (Australia) James Courtney	22			9	(Australia) Russell Ingall (Australia) Luke Youlden			10
9	Holden Racing Team (Holden Commodore VZ)				Stone Brothers Racing (Ford Falcon BA)				10
11			(Australia) Cameron McConville (Australia) Andrew Jones	34			6	(Australia) Jason Bright (Australia) David Brabham	12
11			Garry Rogers Motorsport (Holden Commodore VZ)				Ford Performance Racing (Ford Falcon BA)		12
13	(Australia) Greg Ritter (Australia) Cameron McLean	5			25	(Australia) Steve Owen (Australia) Matthew White			14
13	Ford Performance Racing (Ford Falcon BA)				Britek Motorsport (Ford Falcon BA)				14
15			(Australia) Steven Johnson (Australia) Will Davison	17			88	(Australia) Steve Ellery (Australia) Adam Macrow	16
15			Dick Johnson Racing (Ford Falcon BA)				Triple Eight Race Engineering (Ford Falcon BA)		16
17	(Australia) Jason Bargwanna (Australia) Mark Winterbottom	20			44	(Brazil) Max Wilson (Australia) Tony Longhurst			18
17	Larkham Motor Sport (Ford Falcon BA)				Team Dynamik (Holden Commodore VZ)				18
19			(New Zealand) Craig Baird (Australia) David Besnard	48			67	(Australia) Paul Morris (New Zealand) Paul Radisić	20
19			WPS Racing (Ford Falcon BA)				Paul Morris Motorsport (Holden Commodore VZ)		20
21	(Australia) Tim Leahey (Australia) Mark Noske	15			10	(Switzerland) Alain Menu (New Zealand) Matthew Halliday			22
21	HSV Dealer Team (Holden Commodore VZ)				Larkham Motor Sport (Ford Falcon BA)				22
23			(Australia) Alex Davison (Denmark) Allan Simonsen	7			75	(Australia) Anthony Tratt (Australia) Tony Evangelou	24
23			Rod Nash Racing (Holden Commodore VZ)				Paul Little Racing (Holden Commodore VY)		24
25	(New Zealand) Fabian Coulthard (Australia) Tony D'Alberto	23			21	(Australia) John Bowe (Australia) Brad Jones			26
25	Tasman Motorsport (Holden Commodore VZ)				Brad Jones Racing (Ford Falcon BA)				26
27			(New Zealand) John Faulkner (Australia) Alan Gurr	021			33	(Australia) Phillip Scifleet (Australia) Lee Holdsworth	28
27			Team Kiwi Racing (Holden Commodore VZ)				Garry Rogers Motorsport (Holden Commodore VZ)		28
29	(United Kingdom) John Cleland (Australia) Dale Brede	12			45	(New Zealand) Mark Porter (New Zealand) Kayne Scott			30
29	Brad Jones Racing (Ford Falcon BA)				Team Dynamik (Holden Commodore VZ)				30
31			(Australia) Matthew Coleman (Australia) Christian D'Agostin	11			52	(Australia) José Fernández (Australia) Damien White	32
31			Perkins Engineering (Holden Commodore VY)				Britek Motorsport (Ford Falcon BA)		32
33	(Australia) Owen Kelly (Australia) Nathan Pretty	50			8	(Australia) Marcus Marshall (Canada) Alex Tagliani			34
33	Paul Weel Racing (Holden Commodore VZ)				WPS Racing (Ford Falcon BA)				34

== Race results ==
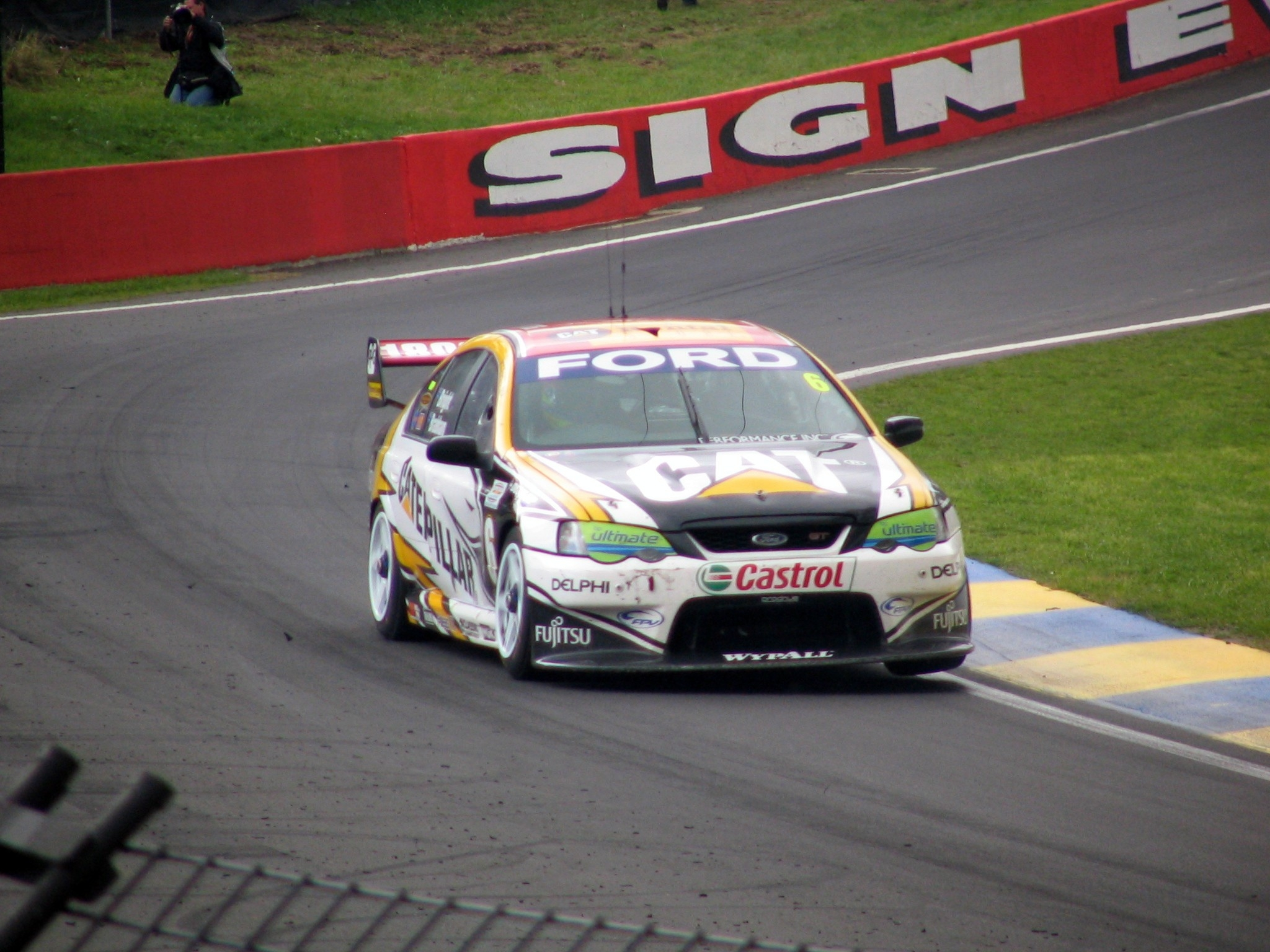
Jason Bright and David Brabham placed 14th driving a Ford BA Falcon

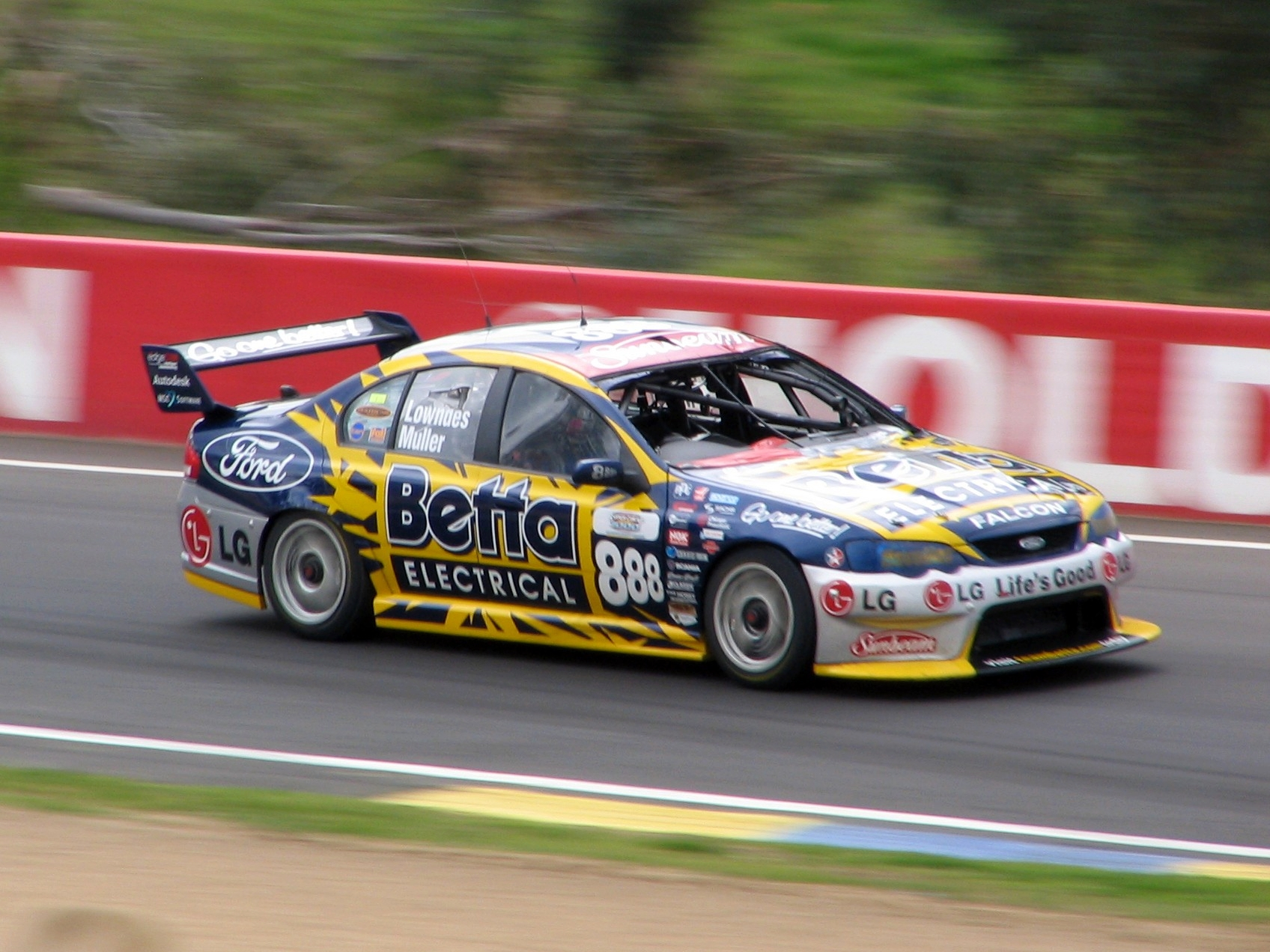
Craig Lowndes and Yvan Muller placed 15th driving a Ford BA Falcon

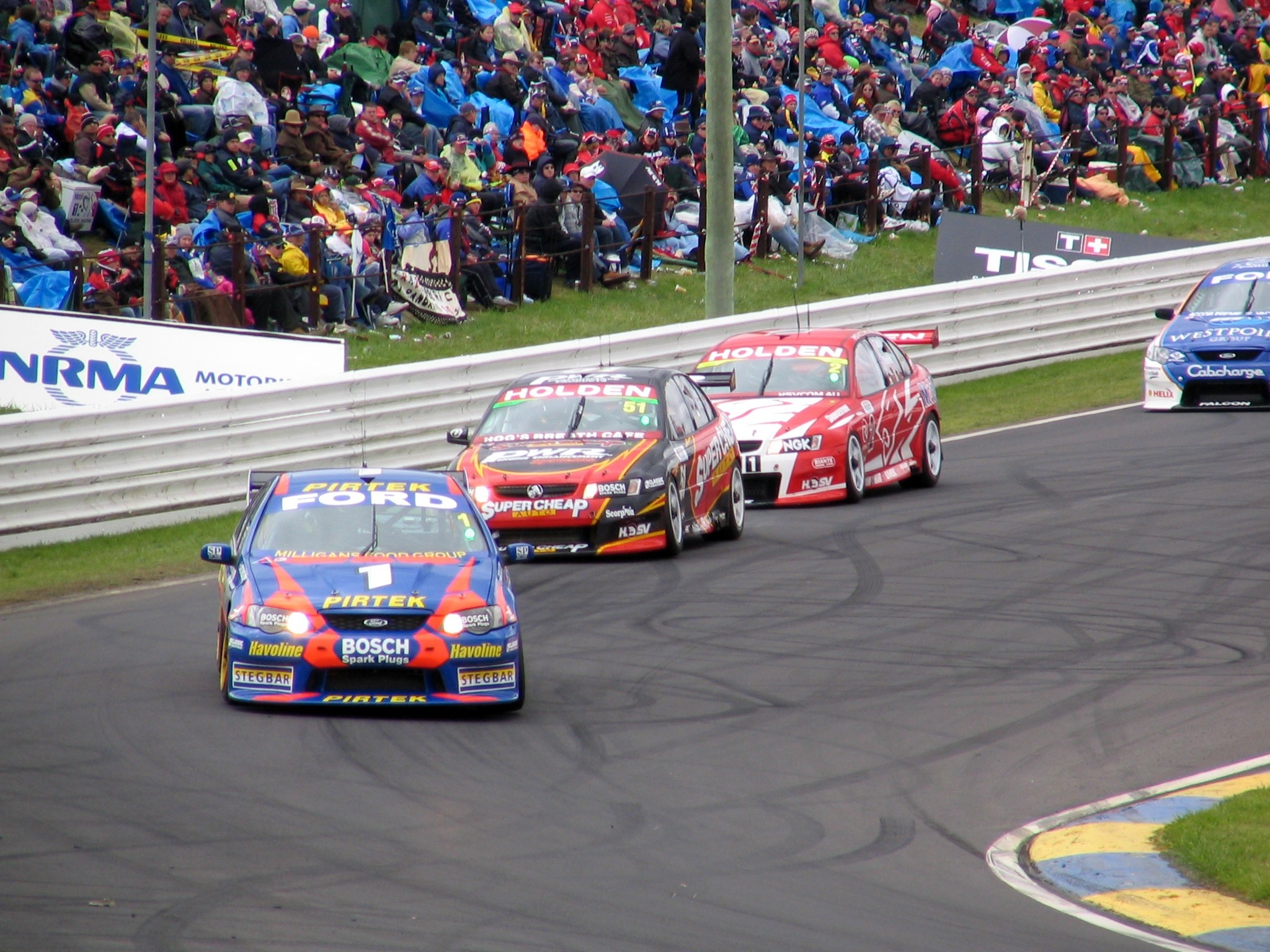
Marcos Ambrose and Warren Luff did not finish in a Ford BA Falcon

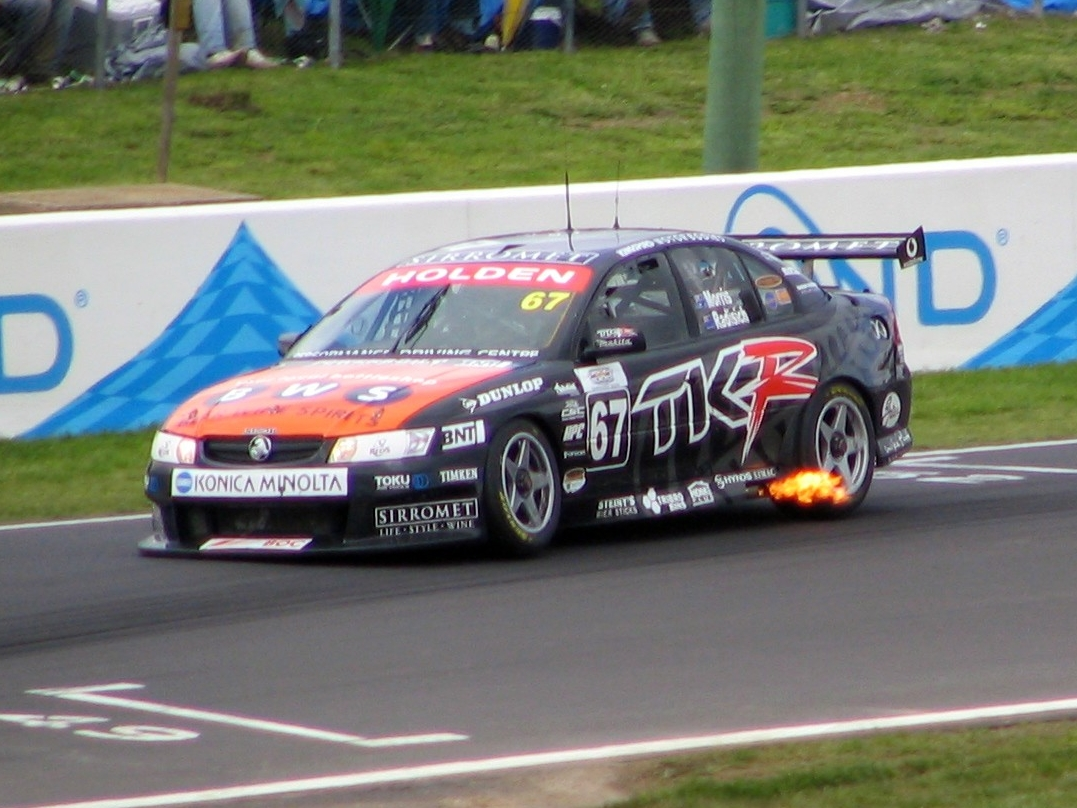
Paul Morris and Paul Radisich did not finish in a Holden VZ Commodore

Pos	No	Team	Drivers	Car	Laps	Time/Retired	Grid	Points
1	2	Holden Racing Team	(Australia) Mark Skaife (Australia) Todd Kelly	Holden VZ Commodore	161	6:37:17.0012	4	192
2	3	Tasman Motorsport	(New Zealand) Jason Richards (Australia) Jamie Whincup	Holden VZ Commodore	161	+2.4877	7	188
3	88	Triple Eight Race Engineering	(Australia) Steve Ellery (Australia) Adam Macrow	Ford BA Falcon	161	+15.8041	16	184
4	34	Garry Rogers Motorsport	(Australia) Cameron McConville (Australia) Andrew Jones	Holden VZ Commodore	161	+19.5755	11	180
5	9	Stone Brothers Racing	(Australia) Russell Ingall (Australia) Luke Youlden	Ford BA Falcon	161	+20.7574	10	176
6	50	Paul Weel Racing	(Australia) Owen Kelly (Australia) Nathan Pretty	Holden VZ Commodore	161	+51.0579	33	172
7	12	Brad Jones Racing	(United Kingdom) John Cleland (Australia) Dale Brede	Ford BA Falcon	159	+2 laps	29	168
8	48	WPS Racing	(New Zealand) Craig Baird (Australia) David Besnard	Ford BA Falcon	158	+3 laps	19	164
9	18	Dick Johnson Racing	(Australia) Glenn Seton (Australia) Dean Canto	Ford BA Falcon	158	+3 laps	8	160
10	021	Team Kiwi Racing; Paul Morris Motorsport	(New Zealand) John Faulkner (Australia) Alan Gurr	Holden VZ Commodore	158	+3 laps	27	156
11	45	Team Dynamik	(New Zealand) Mark Porter (New Zealand) Kayne Scott	Holden VZ Commodore	158	+3 laps	30	152
12	10	Larkham Motor Sport	(Switzerland) Alain Menu (New Zealand) Matt Halliday	Ford BA Falcon	157	+4 laps	22	148
13	8	WPS Racing	(Australia) Marcus Marshall (Canada) Alex Tagliani	Ford BA Falcon	155	+6 laps	34	144
14	6	Ford Performance Racing	(Australia) Jason Bright (Australia) David Brabham	Ford BA Falcon	152	+9 laps	12	140
15	888	Triple Eight Race Engineering	(Australia) Craig Lowndes (France) Yvan Muller	Ford BA Falcon	151	+10 laps	1	136
16	16	HSV Dealer Team	(Australia) Garth Tander (Australia) Rick Kelly	Holden VZ Commodore	149	+12 laps	5	132
17	52	Britek Motorsport	(Australia) José Fernández (Australia) Damien White	Ford BA Falcon	148	+13 laps	32	128
18	5	Ford Performance Racing	(Australia) Greg Ritter (Australia) Cameron McLean	Ford BA Falcon	138	+23 laps	13	124
19	17	Dick Johnson Racing	(Australia) Steven Johnson (Australia) Will Davison	Ford BA Falcon	133	+28 laps	15	120
20	7	Rod Nash Racing; Perkins Engineering	(Australia) Alex Davison (Denmark) Allan Simonsen	Holden VZ Commodore	129	+32 laps	23	116
21	21	Brad Jones Racing	(Australia) John Bowe (Australia) Brad Jones	Ford BA Falcon	125	+36 laps	26	112
DNF	51	Paul Weel Racing	(New Zealand) Greg Murphy (Australia) Paul Weel	Holden VZ Commodore	144	Crash	3	
DNF	1	Stone Brothers Racing	(Australia) Marcos Ambrose (Australia) Warren Luff	Ford BA Falcon	144	Crash	2	
DNF	25	Britek Motorsport	(Australia) Steve Owen (Australia) Matthew White	Ford BA Falcon	136	Engine	14	
DNF	33	Garry Rogers Motorsport	(Australia) Phillip Scifleet (Australia) Lee Holdsworth	Holden VZ Commodore	136	Crash	28	
DNF	11	Perkins Engineering	(Australia) Matthew Coleman (Australia) Christian D'Agostin	Holden VZ Commodore	135	Engine	31	
DNF	20	Larkham Motor Sport	(Australia) Jason Bargwanna (Australia) Mark Winterbottom	Ford BA Falcon	122	Crash	17	
DNF	23	Tasman Motorsport	(New Zealand) Fabian Coulthard (Australia) Tony D'Alberto	Holden VZ Commodore	108	Crash	25	
DNF	75	Paul Little Racing	(Australia) Anthony Tratt (Australia) Tony Evangelou	Holden VY Commodore	92	Engine	24	
DNF	15	HSV Dealer Team	(Australia) Tim Leahey (Australia) Mark Noske	Holden VZ Commodore	32	Crash	21	
DNF	44	Team Dynamik	(Brazil) Max Wilson (Australia) Tony Longhurst	Holden VZ Commodore	32	Crash	18	
DNF	24	Perkins Engineering	(New Zealand) Steven Richards (Australia) Paul Dumbrell	Holden VZ Commodore	28	Crash	6	
DNF	67	Paul Morris Motorsport; Team Kiwi Racing	(Australia) Paul Morris (New Zealand) Paul Radisich	Holden VZ Commodore	26	Suspension	20	
DNF	22	Holden Racing Team	(New Zealand) Jim Richards (Australia) James Courtney	Holden VZ Commodore	7	Crash	9	

== Statistics ==
- Provisional Pole – #888 Craig Lowndes – 2:07.1322
- Pole Position – #888 Craig Lowndes – 2:07.4221
- Fastest Lap – #2 Mark Skaife – 2:08.6515 (173.86 km/h) on lap 95 – new outright record
- Average Speed – 151 km/h

== Broadcast ==
Network 10 broadcast the race for the ninth consecutive year, dating back to the 1997 5.0L race.

Network 10
Host: Bill Woods
Booth: Neil Crompton, Leigh Diffey
Pit-lane: Daryl Beattie, Mark Howard, Greg Rust
