= 2000 Clipsal 500 =

Edition of Adelaide 500 held in 2000

(South Australia) 2000 500 Adelaide
Event Information
- Round 3 of 13 in the 2000 Shell Championship Series
- Date: 7–9 April 2000
- Location: Adelaide, South Australia
- Venue: Adelaide Street Circuit
- Weather: Fine, thunderstorms during second race

Results
Race 1
Distance	78 laps	250 km
Pole position	Garth Tander; Garry Rogers Motorsport	1:26.0315
Winner	Craig Lowndes; Holden Racing Team	2:09:49.8295
Race 2
Distance	78 laps	250 km
Winner	Mark Skaife; Holden Racing Team	2:16:09.1030
Round Results
First	Garth Tander; Garry Rogers Motorsport	212 pts
Second	Jason Bargwanna; Garry Rogers Motorsport	188 pts
Third	Glenn Seton; Ford Tickford Racing	176 pts

The 2000 500 Adelaide, known for naming rights reasons as the 2000 Clipsal 500, was the second running of the Adelaide 500 race. Racing was held form Friday 7 April until Sunday 9 April 2000. The race was held for V8 Supercars and was Round 3 of the 2000 Shell Championship Series.

== Format ==
The format, unique to V8 Supercar and loosely similar to the Pukekohe 500 format, splits the 500 kilometres into two separate 250 kilometres races each held on a different day. Unlike the 1999 race the two races were no longer combined into a single timesheet. Points were still assigned separately to the races, and they combined to award a round result.

== Official results ==
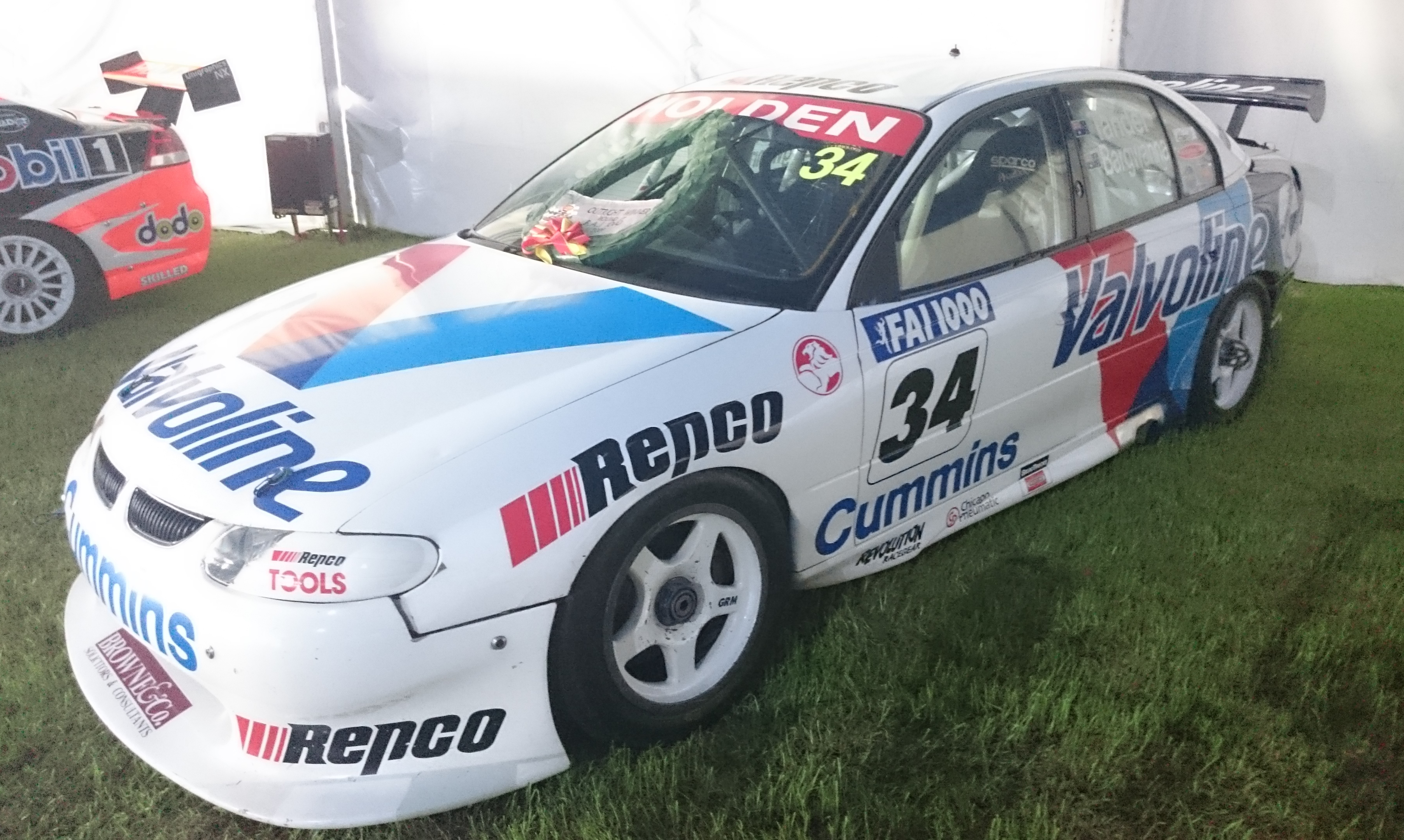
Garth Tander was the top pointscorer at the event driving this Holden Commodore VT. The car is pictured in 2018.

=== Top ten shootout ===
Results sourced from:

Pos	No	Team	Driver	Car	Time
Pole	34	Garry Rogers Motorsport	(Australia) Garth Tander	Holden VT Commodore	1:26.0315
2	2	Holden Racing Team	(Australia) Mark Skaife	Holden VT Commodore	1:26.1962
3	8	Perkins Engineering	(Australia) Russell Ingall	Holden VT Commodore	1:26.3731
4	1	Holden Racing Team	(Australia) Craig Lowndes	Holden VT Commodore	1:26.7301
5	600	Briggs Motor Sport	(Australia) John Bowe	Ford AU Falcon	1:26.7518
6	5	Ford Tickford Racing	(Australia) Glenn Seton	Ford AU Falcon	1:26.7958
7	11	Perkins Engineering	(Australia) Larry Perkins	Holden VT Commodore	1:27.4627
8	35	Garry Rogers Motorsport	(Australia) Jason Bargwanna	Holden VT Commodore	1:27.6687
9	18	Dick Johnson Racing	(New Zealand) Paul Radisich	Ford AU Falcon	4:43.9422
10	7	Gibson Motorsport	(New Zealand) Steven Richards	Holden VT Commodore	DNS

=== Leg 1 ===
Results sourced from:

Pos	No	Team	Driver	Car	Laps	Qual Pos	Shootout Pos
1	1	Holden Racing Team	(Australia) Craig Lowndes	Holden VT Commodore	78	5	4
2	5	Ford Tickford Racing	(Australia) Glenn Seton	Ford AU Falcon	78	2	6
3	34	Garry Rogers Motorsport	(Australia) Garth Tander	Holden VT Commodore	78	4	1
4	7	Gibson Motorsport	(New Zealand) Steven Richards	Holden VT Commodore	78	9	10
5	18	Dick Johnson Racing	(New Zealand) Paul Radisich	Ford AU Falcon	78	1	9
6	17	Dick Johnson Racing	(Australia) Steven Johnson	Ford AU Falcon	78	19	
7	35	Garry Rogers Motorsport	(Australia) Jason Bargwanna	Holden VT Commodore	78	10	8
8	12	Gibson Motorsport	(New Zealand) Greg Murphy	Holden VT Commodore	78	18	
9	9	Stone Brothers Racing	(Australia) Tony Longhurst	Ford AU Falcon	78	13	
10	46	John Faulkner Racing	(New Zealand) John Faulkner	Holden VT Commodore	78	16	
11	15	Holden Racing Team	(Australia) Todd Kelly	Holden VT Commodore	78	24	
12	600	Briggs Motor Sport	(Australia) John Bowe	Ford AU Falcon	78	7	5
13	4	Stone Brothers Racing	(New Zealand) Craig Baird	Ford AU Falcon	77	21	
14	54	Rod Nash Racing	(Australia) Cameron McConvlle	Holden VT Commodore	77	28	
15	3	Lansvale Racing Team	(Australia) Trevor Ashby	Holden VS Commodore	77	22	
16	23	Lansvale Racing Team	(Australia) Steve Reed	Holden VS Commodore	77	35	
17	29	Paul Morris Motorsport	(Australia) Paul Morris	Holden VS Commodore	77	26	
18	16	McDougall Motorsport	(Australia) Dugal McDougall	Holden VT Commodore	77	25	
19	26	M3 Motorsport	(Australia) Peter Doulman	Holden VT Commodore	77	29	
20	50	Clive Wiseman Racing	(Australia) Michael Donaher	Holden VS Commodore	76	32	
21	32	Tomas Mezera Motorsport	(Australia) Tomas Mezera	Holden VT Commodore	76	23	
22	45	Dean Canto Racing	(Australia) Dean Canto	Ford EL Falcon	76	39	
23	22	Colourscan Racing	(Australia) Matthew Coleman	Ford AU Falcon	76	36	
24	39	Challenge Motorsport	(Australia) Chris Smerdon	Holden VT Commodore	75	30	
25	97	Graphic Skills Racing	(Australia) Wayne Wakefield	Holden VS Commodore	74	DNQ	
26	500	Power Racing	(Australia) Alan Heath	Ford EL Falcon	74	37	
27	10	Larkham Motor Sport	(Australia) Mark Larkham	Ford AU Falcon	74	11	
28	20	Eastern Creek Karts	(Australia) Garry Holt	Ford EL Falcon	73	38	
29	75	Paul Little Racing	(Australia) Anthony Tratt	Ford AU Falcon	72	34	
DNF	40	Greenfield Mowers Racing	(Australia) Cameron McLean	Ford AU Falcon	74	12	
DNF	13	Bob Forbes Racing	(Australia) Rodney Forbes	Holden VT Commodore	63	31	
DNF	21	Brad Jones Racing	(Australia) Brad Jones	Ford AU Falcon	56	20	
NC	66	James Rosenberg Racing	(Australia) Mark Poole	Holden VT Commodore	56	14	
NC	6	Ford Tickford Racing	(Australia) Neil Crompton	Ford AU Falcon	46	17	
DNF	11	Perkins Engineering	(Australia) Larry Perkins	Holden VT Commodore	37	8	7
DNF	8	Perkins Engineering	(Australia) Russell Ingall	Holden VT Commodore	34	6	3
DNF	2	Holden Racing Team	(Australia) Mark Skaife	Holden VT Commodore	32	3	2
NC	31	Steven Ellery Racing	(Australia) Steve Ellery	Ford AU Falcon	28	15	
DNF	24	Romano Racing	(Australia) Paul Romano	Holden VS Commodore	27	33	
DNF	43	Paul Weel Racing	(Australia) Paul Weel	Ford AU Falcon	5	27	

=== Leg 2 ===
Results sourced from:

Pos	No	Team	Driver	Car	Laps	Qual Pos	Shootout Pos	Leg 1
1	2	Holden Racing Team	(Australia) Mark Skaife	Holden VT Commodore	78	3	2	36
2	34	Garry Rogers Motorsport	(Australia) Garth Tander	Holden VT Commodore	78	4	1	3
3	35	Garry Rogers Motorsport	(Australia) Jason Bargwanna	Holden VT Commodore	78	10	8	7
4	600	Briggs Motor Sport	(Australia) John Bowe	Ford AU Falcon	78	7	5	12
5	12	Gibson Motorsport	(New Zealand) Greg Murphy	Holden VT Commodore	78	18		8
6	8	Perkins Engineering	(Australia) Russell Ingall	Holden VT Commodore	78	6	3	35
7	5	Ford Tickford Racing	(Australia) Glenn Seton	Ford AU Falcon	78	2	6	2
8	17	Dick Johnson Racing	(Australia) Steven Johnson	Ford AU Falcon	78	19		6
9	18	Dick Johnson Racing	(New Zealand) Paul Radisich	Ford AU Falcon	78	1	9	5
10	9	Stone Brothers Racing	(Australia) Tony Longhurst	Ford AU Falcon	78	13		9
11	11	Perkins Engineering	(Australia) Larry Perkins	Holden VT Commodore	77	8	7	34
12	6	Ford Tickford Racing	(Australia) Neil Crompton	Ford AU Falcon	77	17		33
13	10	Larkham Motor Sport	(Australia) Mark Larkham	Ford AU Falcon	77	11		27
14	46	John Faulkner Racing	(New Zealand) John Faulkner	Holden VT Commodore	77	16		10
15	4	Stone Brothers Racing	(New Zealand) Craig Baird	Ford AU Falcon	76	21		13
16	29	Paul Morris Motorsport	(Australia) Paul Morris	Holden VS Commodore	76	26		17
17	7	Gibson Motorsport	(New Zealand) Steven Richards	Holden VT Commodore	76	9	10	4
18	32	Tomas Mezera Motorsport	(Australia) Tomas Mezera	Holden VT Commodore	76	23		21
19	40	Greenfield Mowers Racing	(Australia) Cameron McLean	Ford AU Falcon	76	12		30
20	50	Clive Wiseman Racing	(Australia) Michael Donaher	Holden VS Commodore	75	32		20
21	39	Challenge Motorsport	(Australia) Chris Smerdon	Holden VT Commodore	75	30		24
22	43	Paul Weel Racing	(Australia) Paul Weel	Ford AU Falcon	75	27		38
23	3	Lansvale Racing Team	(Australia) Trevor Ashby	Holden VS Commodore	74	22		15
24	75	Paul Little Racing	(Australia) Anthony Tratt	Ford AU Falcon	74	34		29
25	45	Dean Canto Racing	(Australia) Dean Canto	Ford EL Falcon	74	39		22
26	26	M3 Motorsport	(Australia) Peter Doulman	Holden VT Commodore	73	29		19
27	22	Colourscan Racing	(Australia) Matthew Coleman	Ford AU Falcon	70	36		23
28	500	Power Racing	(Australia) Alan Heath	Ford EL Falcon	70	37		26
DNF	15	Holden Racing Team	(Australia) Todd Kelly	Holden VT Commodore	72	24		11
DNF	1	Holden Racing Team	(Australia) Craig Lowndes	Holden VT Commodore	62	5	4	1
DNF	20	Eastern Creek Karts	(Australia) Garry Holt	Ford EL Falcon	58	38		28
DNF	16	McDougall Motorsport	(Australia) Dugal McDougall	Holden VT Commodore	55	25		18
DNF	54	Rod Nash Racing	(Australia) Cameron McConvlle	Holden VT Commodore	39	28		14
DNF	13	Bob Forbes Racing	(Australia) Rodney Forbes	Holden VT Commodore	31	31		31
DNF	66	James Rosenberg Racing	(Australia) Mark Poole	Holden VT Commodore	19	14		32
DNF	31	Steven Ellery Racing	(Australia) Steve Ellery	Ford AU Falcon	12	15		37
DNF	97	Graphic Skills Racing	(Australia) Wayne Wakefield	Holden VS Commodore	10	DNQ		25
DNF	23	Lansvale Racing Team	(Australia) Steve Reed	Holden VS Commodore	0	35		16
DNS	21	Brad Jones Racing	(Australia) Brad Jones	Ford AU Falcon		20		
DNS	24	Romano Racing	(Australia) Paul Romano	Holden VS Commodore		33		

=== Round results ===
Pos	No	Driver	Leg 1 Points	Leg 2 Points	Total Points
1	34	(Australia) Garth Tander	68	144	212
2	35	(Australia) Jason Bargwanna	52	136	188
3	5	(Australia) Glenn Seton	72	104	176
4	12	(New Zealand) Greg Murphy	48	120	168
5	2	(Australia) Mark Skaife		160	160
6	600	(Australia) John Bowe	32	128	160
7	17	(Australia) Steven Johnson	56	96	152
8	18	(New Zealand) Paul Radisich	60	88	148
9	9	(Australia) Tony Longhurst	44	80	124
10	8	(Australia) Russell Ingall		112	112
11	46	(New Zealand) John Faulkner	40	48	88
12	7	(New Zealand) Steven Richards	64	24	88
13	1	(Australia) Craig Lowndes	80		80
14	11	(Australia) Larry Perkins		72	72
15	4	(New Zealand) Craig Baird	28	40	68
16	6	(Australia) Neil Crompton		64	64
17	10	(Australia) Mark Larkham		56	56
18	29	(Australia) Paul Morris	12	32	44
19	15	(Australia) Todd Kelly	36		36
20	54	(Australia) Cameron McConville	24		24
21	3	(Australia) Trevor Ashby	20		20
22	32	(Australia) Tomas Mezera		16	16
23	23	(Australia) Steve Reed	16		16
24	40	(Australia) Cameron McLean		8	8
25	16	(Australia) Dugal McDougall	8		8
26	50	(Australia) Michael Donaher	2	4	6
27	26	(Australia) Peter Doulman	4		4
28	39	(Australia) Chris Smerdon			
29	43	(Australia) Paul Weel			
30	75	(Australia) Anthony Tratt			
31	45	(Australia) Dean Canto			
32	22	(Australia) Matthew Coleman			
33	500	(Australia) Alan Heath			
34	97	(Australia) Wayne Wakefield			
35	20	(Australia) Garry Holt			
DNF	13	(Australia) Rodney Forbes			
DNF	66	(Australia) Mark Poole			
DNF	31	(Australia) Steven Ellery			
DNF	21	(Australia) Brad Jones			
DNF	24	(Australia) Paul Romano			

== Statistics ==
- Provisional Position - #18 Paul Radisich - 1:25.0687
- Pole Position - #34 Garth Tander - 1:26.0315
- Fastest Lap - #34 Garth Tander - 1:27.0352

V8 Supercar
Previous race: 2000 Wanneroo V8 Supercar Round	2000 season	Next race: 2000 Eastern Creek V8 Supercar Round
