= 2000 Australian Touring Car season =

Seasons
- ← 1999 2001 →

The 2000 Australian Touring Car season was the 41st year of touring car racing in Australia since the first runnings of the Australian Touring Car Championship and the fore-runner of the present day Bathurst 1000, the Armstrong 500.

Two major touring car categories raced in Australia during 2000, V8 Supercar and Super Touring. Between them there were 25 touring car race meetings held during 2000; a thirteen-round series for V8 Supercars, the 2000 Shell Championship Series (SCS), two of them endurance races; a five-round second tier V8 Supercar series 2000 Konica V8 Lites Series (KLS), an eight-round series for Super Touring, the 2000/2001 Australian Super Touring Championship (ASTC), which spilled several weeks into 2001; and V8 Supercar support programme events at the 2000 Australian Grand Prix and 2000 Honda Indy 300.

== Results and standings ==
=== Race calendar ===
The 2000 Australian touring car season consisted of 28 events.

Date	Series	Circuit	City / State	Winner	Team	Car	Report
12 Feb	SCS Round 1	Phillip Island Grand Prix Circuit	Phillip Island, Victoria	Garth Tander	Garry Rogers Motorsport	Holden VT Commodore	
9–11 Mar	Hot Wheels V8 Supercar Showdown	Albert Park street circuit	Melbourne, Victoria	Mark Skaife	Holden Racing Team	Holden VT Commodore	report
18–19 Mar	SCS Round 2	Barbagallo Raceway	Perth, Western Australia	Craig Lowndes	Holden Racing Team	Holden VT Commodore	
26 Mar	KLS Round 1	Eastern Creek Raceway	Sydney, New South Wales	Dean Canto	Dean Canto Racing	Ford EL Falcon	
8–9 Apr	SCS Round 3	Adelaide Street Circuit	Adelaide, South Australia	Garth Tander	Garry Rogers Motorsport	Holden VT Commodore	report
30 Apr	SCS Round 4	Eastern Creek Raceway	Sydney, New South Wales	Mark Skaife	Holden Racing Team	Holden VT Commodore	
7 May	KLS Round 2	Phillip Island Grand Prix Circuit	Phillip Island, Victoria	Ryan McLeod	John Faulkner Racing	Holden VS Commodore	
21 May	SCS Round 5	Hidden Valley Raceway	Darwin, Northern Territory	Mark Skaife	Holden Racing Team	Holden VT Commodore	
28 May	ASTC Round 1	Oran Park Raceway	Sydney, New South Wales	Paul Morris	Paul Morris Motorsport	BMW 320i	
10–11 June	GMC 400 SCS Round 6	Canberra Street Circuit	Canberra, Australian Capital Territory	Steven Richards	Gibson Motorsport	Holden VT Commodore	
18 Jun	KLS Round 3	Oran Park Raceway	Sydney, New South Wales	Dean Canto	Dean Canto Racing	Ford EL Falcon	
18 Jun	ASTC Round 2	Lakeside International Raceway	Brisbane, Queensland	Paul Morris	Paul Morris Motorsport	BMW 320i	
2 Jul	SCS Round 7	Queensland Raceway	Ipswich, Queensland	Craig Lowndes	Holden Racing Team	Holden VT Commodore	
9 Jul	ASTC Round 3	Oran Park Raceway	Sydney, New South Wales	Paul Morris	Paul Morris Motorsport	BMW 320i	
16 Jul	SCS Round 8	Winton Motor Raceway	Benalla, Victoria	Jason Bargwanna	Garry Rogers Motorsport	Holden VT Commodore	
30 Jul	SCS Round 9	Oran Park Raceway	Sydney, New South Wales	Mark Skaife	Holden Racing Team	Holden VT Commodore	
6 Aug	KLS Round 4	Lakeside International Raceway	Brisbane, Queensland	David Besnard	Stone Brothers Racing	Ford EL Falcon	
20 Aug	SCS Round 10	Calder Park Raceway	Melbourne, Victoria	Steven Richards	Gibson Motorsport	Holden VT Commodore	
27 Aug	KLS Round 5	Mallala Motor Sport Park	Adelaide, South Australia	David Besnard	Stone Brothers Racing	Ford EL Falcon	
10 Sep	Queensland 500 SCS Round 11	Queensland Raceway	Ipswich, Queensland	Craig Lowndes; Mark Skaife	Holden Racing Team	Holden VT Commodore	report
8 Oct	SCS Round 12	Sandown Raceway	Melbourne, Victoria	Paul Radisich	Dick Johnson Racing	Ford AU Falcon	
14–15 Oct	FAI V8 Supercar Challenge	Surfers Paradise street circuit	Surfers Paradise, Queensland	Paul Radisich	Dick Johnson Racing	Ford AU Falcon	report
29 Oct	ASTC Round 4	Wakefield Park	Goulburn, New South Wales	Paul Morris	Paul Morris Motorsport	BMW 320i	
12 Nov	ASTC Round 5	Mallala Motor Sport Park	Adelaide, South Australia	Paul Morris	Paul Morris Motorsport	BMW 320i	
19 Nov	FAI Bathurst 1000 SCS Round 13	Mount Panorama Circuit	Bathurst, New South Wales	Garth Tander; Jason Bargwanna	Garry Rogers Motorsport	Holden VT Commodore	report
3 Dec	ASTC Round 6	Symmons Plains Raceway	Launceston, Tasmania	Paul Morris	Paul Morris Motorsport	BMW 320i	
28 Jan	ASTC Round 7	Wakefield Park	Goulburn, New South Wales	Owen Kelly	Paul Morris Motorsport	BMW 320i	
11 Feb	ASTC Round 8	Oran Park Raceway	Sydney, New South Wales	Paul Morris	Paul Morris Motorsport	BMW 320i	

=== Hot Wheels V8 Supercar Showdown ===
This meeting was a support event of the 2000 Australian Grand Prix.

Driver	No.	Team	Car	Race 1	Race 2	Race 3
(Australia) Mark Skaife	2	Holden Racing Team	Holden VT Commodore	2	1	1
(New Zealand) Paul Radisich	18	Dick Johnson Racing	Ford AU Falcon	3	2	2
(Australia) Garth Tander	34	Garry Rogers Motorsport	Holden VT Commodore	1	3	3
(Australia) Craig Lowndes	1	Holden Racing Team	Holden VT Commodore	4	5	4
(Australia) Jason Bargwanna	35	Garry Rogers Motorsport	Holden VT Commodore	DNF	10	5
(Australia) Larry Perkins	11	Castrol Perkins Racing	Holden VT Commodore	6	4	6
(Australia) John Bowe	60	PAE Motorsport	Ford AU Falcon	7	7	7
(New Zealand) John Faulkner	46	John Faulkner Racing	Holden VT Commodore	14	11	8
(Australia) Paul Morris	29	Paul Morris Motorsport	Holden VS Commodore	15	13	9
(Australia) Tony Longhurst	9	Stone Brothers Racing	Ford AU Falcon	9	8	10
(Australia) Steve Ellery	31	Supercheap Auto Racing	Ford AU Falcon	12	18	11
(Australia) Steven Johnson	17	Dick Johnson Racing	Ford AU Falcon	8	DNF	12
(Australia) Rodney Forbes	28	Gibson Motorsport	Holden VT Commodore	DNF	17	13
(Australia) Russell Ingall	8	Castrol Perkins Racing	Holden VT Commodore	5	26	14
(Australia) Cameron McLean	40	Greenfield Mowers Racing	Ford AU Falcon	22	16	15
(Australia) Glenn Seton	5	Ford Tickford Racing	Ford AU Falcon	11	23	16
(Australia) Mark Larkham	10	Larkham Motor Sport	Ford AU Falcon	10	6	17
(Australia) Dugal McDougall	16	Perkins Engineering	Holden VT Commodore	21	19	18
(Australia) Paul Weel	43	Paul Weel Racing	Ford AU Falcon	16	27	19
(New Zealand) Greg Murphy	12	Gibson Motorsport	Holden VT Commodore	DNF	25	20
(Australia) Steve Reed	23	Lansvale Racing Team	Holden VS Commodore	23	20	21
(New Zealand) Craig Baird	4	Stone Brothers Racing	Ford AU Falcon	DNF	DNF	22
(Australia) Sam Newman	99	Gibson Motorsport	Holden VS Commodore	25	24	23
(Australia) Trevor Ashby	3	Lansvale Racing Team	Holden VS Commodore	20	22	24
(Australia) Paul Romano	24	Romano Racing	Holden VS Commodore	19	21	DNF
(Australia) Brad Jones	21	Brad Jones Racing	Ford AU Falcon	DNF	28	DNF
(Australia) Cameron McConville	54	Rod Nash Racing	Holden VT Commodore	18	14	DNF
(Australia) Neil Crompton	6	Ford Tickford Racing	Ford AU Falcon	17	12	DNF
(Australia) Todd Kelly	15	Holden Racing Team	Holden VT Commodore	24	15	DNF
(New Zealand) Steven Richards	7	Gibson Motorsport	Holden VT Commodore	13	9	DNF

=== FAI V8 Supercar Challenge ===
This meeting was a support event of the 2000 Honda Indy 300.

Driver	No.	Team	Car	Top Ten	Race 1	Race 2	Race 3	Points
(New Zealand) Paul Radisich	18	Dick Johnson Racing	Ford AU Falcon	2	1	1	2	56
(Australia) Russell Ingall	8	Castrol Perkins Racing	Holden VT Commodore	1	2	2	1	52
(Australia) Craig Lowndes	1	Holden Racing Team	Holden VT Commodore	4	4	3	3	40
(Australia) Jason Bargwanna	35	Garry Rogers Motorsport	Holden VT Commodore		5	5	4	32
(Australia) Mark Larkham	10	Larkham Motor Sport	Ford AU Falcon	5	6	6	5	26
(Australia) Mark Skaife	2	Holden Racing Team	Holden VT Commodore	3	3	4	DNF	26
(Australia) Tony Longhurst	9	Stone Brothers Racing	Ford AU Falcon	9	7	8	6	18
(Australia) Neil Crompton	6	Glenn Seton Racing	Ford AU Falcon		16	12	7	6
(New Zealand) Craig Baird	4	Stone Brothers Racing	Ford AU Falcon		11	9	8	6
(Australia) Steven Johnson	17	Dick Johnson Racing	Ford AU Falcon	7	14	7	DNF	6
(Australia) Brad Jones	21	Brad Jones Racing	Ford AU Falcon		8	22	16	4
(Australia) Paul Morris	29	Paul Morris Motorsport	Holden VS Commodore		15	13	9	2
(Australia) Rodney Forbes	28	Gibson Motorsport	Holden VT Commodore		10	11	10	2
(Australia) Paul Weel	43	Paul Weel Racing	Ford AU Falcon		9	DNF	DNS	2
(Australia) Steve Reed	23	Lansvale Racing Team	Holden VS Commodore		13	10	12	1
(New Zealand) John Faulkner	46	John Faulkner Racing	Holden VT Commodore		26	14	11	
(Australia) Tyler Mecklem	50	Clive Wiseman Racing	Holden VT Commodore		20	15	13	
(Australia) Anthony Tratt	75	Paul Little Racing	Ford AU Falcon		19	16	14	
(Australia) John Bowe	600	PAE Motorsport	Ford AU Falcon		25	DNS	15	
(Australia) Trevor Ashby	3	Lansvale Racing Team	Holden VS Commodore		21	20	17	
(Australia) Paul Romano	24	Romano Racing	Holden VS Commodore		18	18	18	
(Australia) Rodney Crick	14	Imrie Motor Sport	Holden VT Commodore		23	21	19	
(Australia) Dugal McDougall	16	Perkins Engineering	Holden VT Commodore		12	19	20	
(Australia) Larry Perkins	11	Castrol Perkins Racing	Holden VS Commodore		17	DNF	DNF	
(Australia) Cameron McConville	54	Rod Nash Racing	Holden VT Commodore		24	17	DNF	
(Australia) Christian D'Agostin	99	Motorsport Engineering Services	Holden VT Commodore		22	DNF	DNS	
(Australia) Steve Ellery	31	Supercheap Auto Racing	Ford AU Falcon	6	DNF	DNS	DNS	
(New Zealand) Greg Murphy	12	Gibson Motorsport	Holden VT Commodore	8	DNF	DNS	DNS	
(New Zealand) Steven Richards	7	Gibson Motorsport	Holden VT Commodore	10	DNF	DNS	DNS	
(Australia) Garth Tander	34	Garry Rogers Motorsport	Holden VT Commodore		DNS	DNS	DNS	
