= Matt Coleman =

Matt Coleman may refer to:

- Matt Coleman III, American basketball player
- Matthew Coleman, Australian racing car driver
