= DiJones Real Estate =

Real estate group from Australia

- Type: Proprietary
- Industry: Real estate
- Founded: 1992
- Founder: Diane Lenore Jones
- Headquarters: Sydney, Australia
- Area served: Australia
- Services: Real estate
- Operating income: AUD$44.9 million (2024)
- Number of employees: 272 (2024)
- Website: www.dijones.com.au

DiJones Real Estate is an Australian real estate group specialising in residential and commercial sales and property management. The company operates from 21 offices in Sydney, Central Coast, Southern Highlands and Illawarra districts of New South Wales.

== History ==
DiJones was founded by female entrepreneur Diane Lenore Jones. Jones was married to Bill Jones, an auctioneer at LJ Hooker Real Estate. When her son Matthew was born with disabilities and needed extra help she made the decision to go out to work to fund the care. Several years later in an interview she said "If not for Matthew's illness, I'd probably have remained a housewife." She worked at two other real estate businesses before she founded Jones & Jones Pty Ltd trading as DiJones Real Estate in 1992.

Jones found that there was an unconscious gender bias favourable to her when engaging with female clients. At the time in Australia there were few female estate agents so Jones decided to set up her own female owned and operated agency, encouraged by those who kept telling her how much they liked her "female touch". This was a first for the Australian real estate industry.

Diane Lenore Jones died in 2018 from pulmonary disease.

== See also ==
- Westpoint Corporation
