= 2002 Australian Super Touring Series =

Seasons
- ← 2001 2019 (TCR) →

The 2002 Australian Super Touring Car Series was a CAMS sanctioned motor racing competition open to Super Touring Cars. It was the tenth running of an Australian series for Super Touring Cars and the second to be contested under the Australian Super Touring Series name. The series began on 24 March 2002 at Oran Park Raceway and ended on 24 November 2002 at Oran Park Raceway after five rounds. It would be the final season for such touring cars until the 2019 TCR Australia Touring Car Series, which is a contemporary take on the four-cylinder touring car formula.

== Future Touring Cars ==
The grids for the 2002 championship were bolstered with cars from the Future Touring Car category. This category, which catered for V8 powered cars that had competed previously in AUSCAR racing, made its debut in a support event to the 1999 Bathurst 500. While the Future Touring Cars and the Super Touring Cars raced together in the same events, drivers competed for two separate titles with separate points scoring for each category.

== Teams and drivers ==
The following teams and drivers competed in the 2002 Australian Super Touring Championship.

| Team | Manufacturer | Car model | No | Driver |
|---|---|---|---|---|
| Mumbo Racing | Nissan | Primera | 2 | (United Kingdom) David Towe |
| Mumbo Racing | Ford | Mondeo | 12 | (Australia) Sam Dale |
| MPD Racing | BMW | 318is | 3 | (Australia) Luke Searle |
| Team MGM | Alfa Romeo | 155 TS | 7 | (Australia) Andre Morgan |
| Justin Wade | Peugeot | 405 Mi16 | 10 | (Australia) Craig Neilson |
| OMP Racing | Nissan | Primera | 21 | (Australia) Andrew Haberfield |
| SAE Racing | BMW | 320i | 30 | (Australia) Alan Gurr |
| Knight Racing | Ford | Mondeo | 31 | (Australia) Grant Johnson (Australia) Matthew Fox |
| Knight Racing | Ford | Mondeo | 88 | (Australia) Peter Hills |
| TC Motorsport | Peugeot | 406 | 35 | (Australia) Ric Shaw |
| Hi-Tech Motorsport | Nissan | Primera | 69 | (Australia) Matthew Fox |
| Motorsport Developments | Toyota | Carina | 77 | (Australia) Malcolm Rea |
| Motorsport Developments | Toyota | Carina | 99 | (Australia) Claude Elias (Australia) Carlos Rolfo |
| Motorsport Developments | Peugeot | 405 Mi16 | 99 | (Australia) Claude Elias (Australia) Carlos Rolfo |
| Phoenix Motorsport | Toyota | Camry | 95 | (Australia) Jamie Miller |
| Redline Motorsport | Toyota | Camry | 96 | (Australia) Michael Kerslake |
| Redline Motorsport | Hyundai | Lantra | 97 | (Australia) Paul Leabeater |

== Race Calendar ==
The 2002 Australian Super Touring Championship was contested over a five-round series, with three races held each round.

| Rd./Race | Circuit | Location & State | Date | Winner | Team |
|---|---|---|---|---|---|
| 1/1 | Oran Park Raceway | Sydney, New South Wales | 24 Mar 2002 | Peter Hills | Knight Racing |
| 1/2 | Oran Park Raceway | Sydney, New South Wales | 24 Mar 2002 | Alan Gurr | SAE Racing |
| 1/3 | Oran Park Raceway | Sydney, New South Wales | 24 Mar 2002 | Alan Gurr | SAE Racing |
| 2/1 | Mallala Motor Sport Park | Adelaide, South Australia | 21 Apr 2002 | Alan Gurr | SAE Racing |
| 2/2 | Mallala Motor Sport Park | Adelaide, South Australia | 21 Apr 2002 | Alan Gurr | SAE Racing |
| 2/3 | Mallala Motor Sport Park | Adelaide, South Australia | 21 Apr 2002 | Alan Gurr | SAE Racing |
| 3/1 | Queensland Raceway | Ipswich, Queensland | 23 Jun 2002 | Alan Gurr | SAE Racing |
| 3/2 | Queensland Raceway | Ipswich, Queensland | 23 Jun 2002 | Alan Gurr | SAE Racing |
| 3/3 | Queensland Raceway | Ipswich, Queensland | 23 Jun 2002 | Alan Gurr | SAE Racing |
| 4/1 | Wakefield Park | Goulburn, New South Wales | 29 Sep 2002 | Alan Gurr | SAE Racing |
| 4/2 | Wakefield Park | Goulburn, New South Wales | 29 Sep 2002 | Alan Gurr | SAE Racing |
| 4/3 | Wakefield Park | Goulburn, New South Wales | 29 Sep 2002 | Alan Gurr | SAE Racing |
| 5/1 | Oran Park Raceway | Sydney, New South Wales | 24 Nov 2002 | Peter Hills | Knight Racing |
| 5/2 | Oran Park Raceway | Sydney, New South Wales | 24 Nov 2002 | Alan Gurr | SAE Racing |
| 5/3 | Oran Park Raceway | Sydney, New South Wales | 24 Nov 2002 | Luke Searle | MPD Racing |

== Results ==
=== Drivers Championship ===
| Pos | Driver | ORA 1 | ORA 2 | ORA 3 | MAL 1 | MAL 2 | MAL 3 | QLD 1 | QLD 2 | QLD 3 | WAK 1 | WAK 2 | WAK 3 | ORA 4 | ORA 5 | ORA 6 | Pts |
|---|---|---|---|---|---|---|---|---|---|---|---|---|---|---|---|---|---|
| 1 | Alan Gurr | DSQ | 1st | 1st | 1st | 1st | 1st | 1st | 1st | 1st | 1st | 1st | 1st | 2nd | 1st | 2nd | 283 |
| 2 | Peter Hills | 1st | DNS | Ret | 2nd | 2nd | 2nd | 6th | 4th | 2nd | 2nd | 6th | 2nd | 1st | 2nd | 5th | 236 |
| 3 | Andre Morgan | 4th | 6th | 3rd | 3rd | 4th | 4th | 4th | Ret | DNS | 5th | 5th | 3rd | DNS | DNS | DNS | 165 |
| 4 | Paul Leabeater | 6th | 4th | 4th | Ret | DNS | DNS | 3rd | 6th | 7th | Ret | 4th | 5th | 4th | Ret | DNS | 145 |
| 5 | Grant Johnson | 2nd | 2nd | 5th | Ret | 3rd | 3rd | 2nd | 2nd | 9th | Ret | DNS | DNS | | | | 138 |
| 6 | Sam Dale | 5th | Ret | DNS | | | | Ret | 3rd | 3rd | 3rd | 3rd | DNS | Ret | 4th | 5th | 120 |
| 7 | Malcolm Rea | 9th | 5th | 6th | 4th | 5th | 5th | DNS | 9th | 6th | | | | | | | 119 |
| 8 | Luke Searle | | | | | | | 5th | 5th | Ret | | | | 3rd | 3rd | 1st | 88 |
| 9 | Michael Kerslake | 8th | Ret | DNS | | | | 7th | 8th | 5th | Ret | DNS | DNS | | | | 56 |
| 10 | Claude Elias | 7th | 7th | DNS | | | | | | | | | | 7th | 7th | Ret | 56 |
| 11 | Ric Shaw | 3rd | 3rd | 2nd | | | | | | | | | | | | | 56 |
| 12 | Clayton Pyne | | | | | | | | | | 4th | 2nd | 4th | | | | 53 |
| 13 | Andrew Haberfield | | | | | | | 4th | 7th | 4th | | | | | | | 48 |
| 14 | Matthew Fox | | | | | | | | | | Ret | DNS | DNS | 5th | 5th | 3rd | 48 |
| 15 | Craig Neilson | | | | | | | 9th | 10th | 8th | | | | | | | 33 |
| 16 | Carlos Rolfo | | | | 5th | DNS | DNS | Ret | Ret | DNS | | | | | | | 16 |
| 17 | David Towe | | | | | | | | | | | | | Ret | DNS | DNS | 0 |
| Pos | Driver | ORA 1 | ORA 2 | ORA 3 | MAL 1 | MAL 2 | MAL 3 | QLD 1 | QLD 2 | QLD 3 | WAK 1 | WAK 2 | WAK 3 | ORA 4 | ORA 5 | ORA 6 | Pts |

| Colour | Result |
|---|---|
| Gold | Winner |
| Silver | Second place |
| Bronze | Third place |
| Green | Points classification |
| Blue | Non-points classification |
| Blue | Non-classified finish (NC) |
| Purple | Retired, not classified (Ret) |
| Red | Did not qualify (DNQ) |
| Red | Did not pre-qualify (DNPQ) |
| Black | Disqualified (DSQ) |
| White | Did not start (DNS) |
| White | Withdrew (WD) |
| White | Race cancelled (C) |
| Blank | Did not practice (DNP) |
| Blank | Did not arrive (DNA) |
| Blank | Excluded (EX) |

== See also ==
- 2002 Australian Touring Car season
