= 1998 Australian Super Touring Championship =

1998 ASTC season

Seasons
- ← 1997 1999 →

The 1998 Australian Super Touring Championship was the sixth running of a CAMS sanctioned motor racing series in Australia under the Super Touring Car regulations and the fourth to carry the Australian Super Touring Championship name. It began on 5 April 1998 at Calder Park Raceway and ended on 30 August at Oran Park Raceway after eight rounds. The series was promoted by TOCA Australia as the 1998 BOC Gases Australian Super Touring Championship. As in the British Touring Car Championship the race format changed with each meeting now consisting a shorter "sprint" race and a "feature" race, 25% longer than previous races featuring a mandatory two-tyre stop to be taken between 15 and 75% distance. The one exception was the round at Lakeside Raceway where the pit lane was deemed unsuitable.

The Drivers Championship was won by Brad Jones driving an Audi A4 Quattro, the Manufacturers Championship was awarded to Audi and the Teams Championship was won by Audi Sport Australia.

== Entry list ==
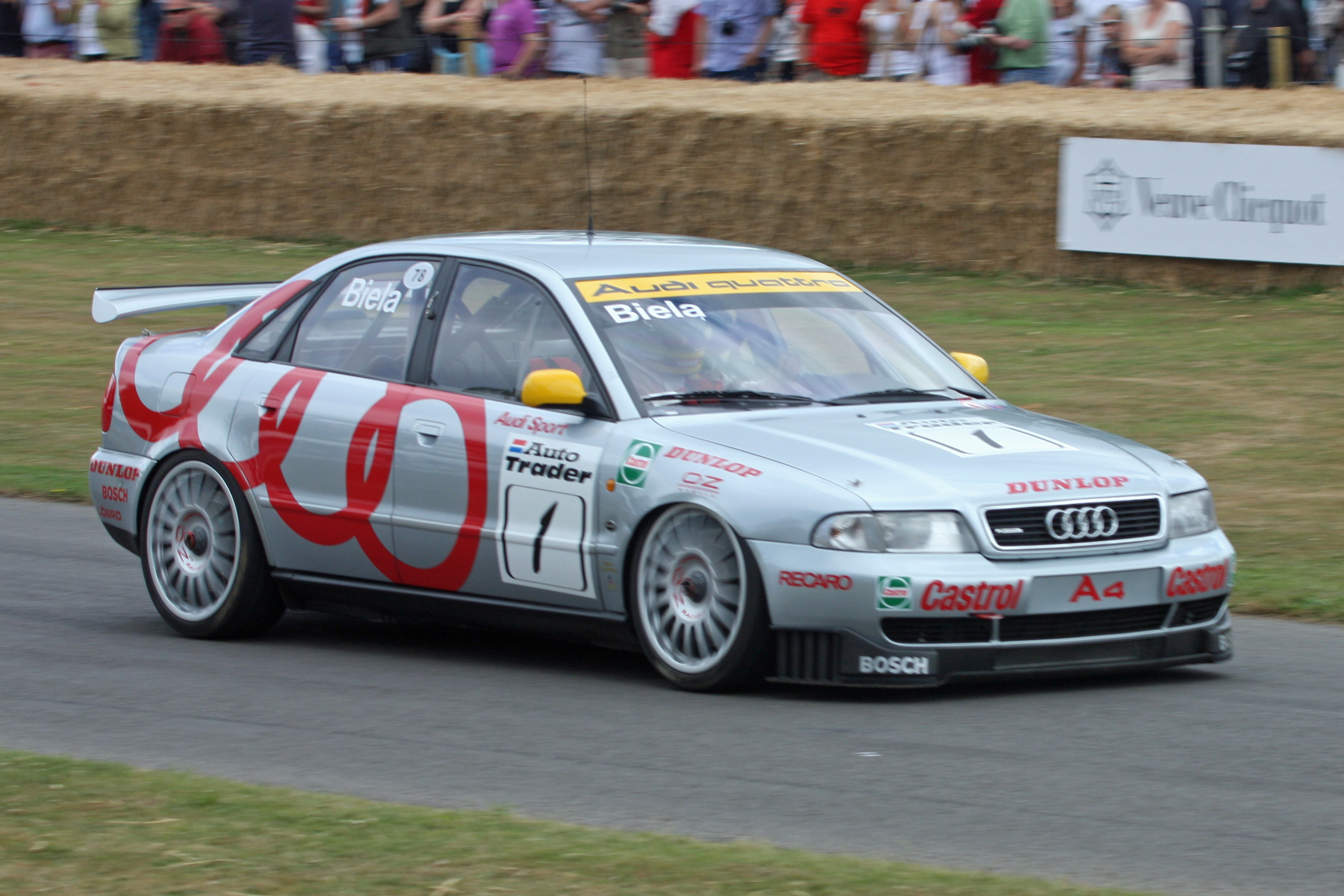
Brad Jones won the Drivers Championship with an Audi A4 Quattro similar to the example pictured above.

The following teams and drivers competed in the 1998 Australian Super Touring Championship.

Team	Car	No	Driver
Audi Sport Australia	Audi A4 Quattro	3	(Australia) Cameron McConville
Audi Sport Australia	Audi A4 Quattro	4	(Australia) Brad Jones
Audi Sport Australia	Audi A4 Quattro	14	(Australia) Trevor Sheumack
TC Motorsport	Peugeot 406	10	(New Zealand) Tony Newman
TC Motorsport	Peugeot 405 Mi16	38	(New Zealand) Dwayne Bewley
AAP Racing	Toyota Carina	11	(Australia) Milton Leslight
Greenfield Mowers Racing	BMW 320i	12	(Australia) Cameron McLean
Grid Motorsport	BMW 318i	13	(Australia) Anthony Robson (Australia) Craig Bradshaw
Racing Projects	Honda Accord	15	(Australia) Mark Adderton
Racing Projects	Nissan Primera	22	(Australia) Adam Kaplan
Bob Holden Motors	BMW 318i	16	(Australia) Bob Holden (Australia) Trevor Sheumack (Australia) Justin Mathews (Australia) Paul Nelson
Carlos Rolfo	BMW 318i	20	(Australia) Carlos Rolfo (Australia) Rod Wilson
M-F Racing	Peugeot 405 Mi16	21	(Australia) Mike Fitzgerald
Novacastrian Motorsport	BMW 320i	30	(Australia) Troy Searle
Volvo Dealer Racing	Volvo S40	40	(New Zealand) Jim Richards
Gun Racing	Alfa Romeo 155 TS	45	(Australia) David Auger
John Henderson Racing	Opel Vectra	56	(Australia) John Henderson
Triple P Racing	Hyundai Elantra	58	(Australia) Claude Elias
Knight Racing	Ford Mondeo	60	(Australia) Warren Luff
Knight Racing	Ford Mondeo	88	(Australia) Peter Hills
Knight Racing	Ford Mondeo	89	(Australia) Paul Pickett (Australia) Ric Shaw (Australia) Aaron McGill (Australia) Kurt Kratzmann (New Zealand) Dwayne Bewley (Australia) Mark Zonneveld
Graham Dodd	Honda Accord	69	(New Zealand) Graham Dodd
Motorsport Developments	Toyota Carina	77	(Australia) Malcolm Rea
Robert Tweedie	Vauxhall Cavalier	79	(Australia) Bob Tweedie
Phoenix Motorsport	Toyota Camry	95	(Australia) Ron Searle

=== Team and Driver changes ===
- 1997 championship winners Paul Morris and BMW left the series as BMW scaled back its touring car operation.
- Volvo switched from the 850 to the new S40 for Jim Richards.
- Cameron McLean drove the 1997 championship winning BMW switching from the Opel/Holden Vectra he raced in 1997.
- Tony Newman upgraded to an ex British Touring Car Championship Peugeot 406.
- Mark Adderton switched from the Phoenix Motorsport Toyota Camry to a Honda Accord.

== Race calendar ==
The 1998 Australian Super Touring Championship was contested over eight rounds with two races per round.

Rd.	Race	Race title	Circuit	Location / state	Date	Winner	Team	Car
NC	1	(Australia) Australian Grand Prix support	Albert Park Circuit	Melbourne, Victoria	6–7 Mar	Cameron McConville	Audi Sport Australia	Audi A4 Quattro
NC	2	(Australia) Australian Grand Prix support	Albert Park Circuit	Melbourne, Victoria	6–7 Mar	Cameron McConville	Audi Sport Australia	Audi A4 Quattro
1	1	(Australia) Calder Park	Calder Park Raceway	Melbourne, Victoria	4–5 Apr	Cameron McConville	Audi Sport Australia	Audi A4 Quattro
1	2	(Australia) Calder Park	Calder Park Raceway	Melbourne, Victoria	4–5 Apr	Cameron McConville	Audi Sport Australia	Audi A4 Quattro
2	1	(Australia) Oran Park	Oran Park Raceway South Circuit	Sydney, New South Wales	26–27 Apr	Brad Jones	Audi Sport Australia	Audi A4 Quattro
2	2	(Australia) Oran Park	Oran Park Raceway South Circuit	Sydney, New South Wales	26–27 Apr	Brad Jones	Audi Sport Australia	Audi A4 Quattro
3	1	(Australia) Phillip Island	Phillip Island Grand Prix Circuit	Phillip Island, Victoria	16–17 May	Cameron McConville	Audi Sport Australia	Audi A4 Quattro
3	2	(Australia) Phillip Island	Phillip Island Grand Prix Circuit	Phillip Island, Victoria	16–17 May	Jim Richards	Volvo Dealer Racing	Volvo S40
4	1	(Australia) Eastern Creek	Eastern Creek Raceway	Sydney, New South Wales	6–7 Jun	Jim Richards	Volvo Dealer Racing	Volvo S40
4	2	(Australia) Eastern Creek	Eastern Creek Raceway	Sydney, New South Wales	6–7 Jun	Brad Jones	Audi Sport Australia	Audi A4 Quattro
5	1	(Australia) Lakeside	Lakeside International Raceway	Brisbane, Queensland	27–28 Jun	Brad Jones	Audi Sport Australia	Audi A4 Quattro
5	2	(Australia) Lakeside	Lakeside International Raceway	Brisbane, Queensland	27–28 Jun	Brad Jones	Audi Sport Australia	Audi A4 Quattro
6	1	(Australia) Mallala	Mallala Motor Sport Park	Mallala, South Australia	18–19 Jul	Brad Jones	Audi Sport Australia	Audi A4 Quattro
6	2	(Australia) Mallala	Mallala Motor Sport Park	Mallala, South Australia	18–19 Jul	Cameron McConville	Audi Sport Australia	Audi A4 Quattro
7	1	(Australia) Winton	Winton Motor Raceway	Benalla, Victoria	8–9 Aug	Cameron McConville	Audi Sport Australia	Audi A4 Quattro
7	2	(Australia) Winton	Winton Motor Raceway	Benalla, Victoria	8–9 Aug	Cameron McConville	Audi Sport Australia	Audi A4 Quattro
8	1	(Australia) Oran Park	Oran Park Raceway	Sydney, New South Wales	29–30 Aug	Cameron McConville	Audi Sport Australia	Audi A4 Quattro
8	2	(Australia) Oran Park	Oran Park Raceway	Sydney, New South Wales	29–30 Aug	Brad Jones	Audi Sport Australia	Audi A4 Quattro
NC	1	(Australia) AMP Bathurst 1000	Mount Panorama Circuit	Bathurst, New South Wales	4 Oct	Rickard Rydell & Jim Richards	Volvo S40 Racing	Volvo S40

== Championship standings ==
=== Drivers Championship ===
Points were awarded 15-12-10-8-6-5-4-3-2-1 based on the top ten race positions in each race. There was a bonus point allocated for pole position.

Pos	Driver	Car	Calder		Oran Park		Phillip Is.		Eastern Cr.		Lakeside		Mallala		Winton		Oran Park		Pts
			R1	R2	R1	R2	R1	R2	R1	R2	R1	R2	R1	R2	R1	R2	R1	R2	
1	Brad Jones	Audi A4 Quattro	3rd	2nd	1st	1st	10th	2nd	2nd	1st	1st	1st	1st	2nd	Ret	4th	2nd	1st	191
2	Cameron McConville	Audi A4 Quattro	1st	1st	2nd	2nd	1st	4th	3rd	Ret	2nd	DSQ	2nd	1st	1st	1st	1st	3rd	184
3	Jim Richards	Volvo S40	4th	4th	3rd	3rd	2nd	1st	1st	2nd	3rd	3rd	4th	4th	2nd	3rd	4th	Ret	161
4	Cameron McLean	BMW 320i	2nd	3rd	Ret	6th	3rd	3rd	4th	Ret	4th	2nd	3rd	3rd	3rd	2nd	3rd	2nd	139
5	Mark Adderton	Honda Accord	5th	5th	7th	4th	4th	5th	5th	Ret	5th	4th	7th	Ret	4th	5th	6th	Ret	81
6	Peter Hills	Ford Mondeo	6th	7th	10th	8th	6th	7th	7th	7th	Ret	5th	5th	5th	5th	6th	5th	6th	70
7	Bob Tweedie	Vauxhall Cavalier	7th	6th	9th	9th	7th	9th	10th	9th	10th	8th	6th	8th	7th	9th	8th	11th	43
8	Ron Searle	Toyota Camry	DNS	DNS	6th	5th	DNS	DNS	6th	5th	8th	DSQ	Ret	DNS	Ret	DNS	7th	8th	32
9	Troy Searle	BMW 320i			18th	11th	5th	6th	Ret	3rd	Ret	6th			Ret	DNS	10th	Ret	27
10	David Auger	Alfa Romeo 155 TS	8th	8th	13th	13th	8th	10th	Ret	10th	6th	9th	13th	9th	8th	Ret	11th	9th	25
11	Justin Mathews	BMW 318i					9th	8th	8th	4th	7th	10th	11th	12th					21
12	Adam Kaplan	Nissan Primera			12th	7th			9th	6th			8th	6th	Ret	11th	Ret	13th	19
13	Trevor Sheumack	BMW 318i Audi A4 Quattro			5th	Ret											Ret	4th	14
14	Anthony Robson	BMW 318i	9th	11th			Ret	DNS			11th	Ret	10th	10th	6th	7th	Ret	12th	13
15	Mark Zonneveld	Ford Mondeo													10th	8th	Ret	5th	10
16	John Henderson	Opel Vectra			4th	DNS			DNS	DNS							Ret	Ret	8
17	Kurt Kratzmann	Ford Mondeo									9th	7th							6
17	Paul Pickett	Ford Mondeo	10th	9th	8th	12th													6
19	Dwayne Bewley	Peugeot 405 Mi16; Ford Mondeo			Ret	10th			Ret	DNS			12th	7th					5
20	Rod Wilson	BMW 318i															12th	7th	4
20	Tony Newman	Peugeot 406	Ret	DNS	11th	Ret	DNS	DNS					9th	11th	Ret	Ret	9th	Ret	4
20	Bob Holden	BMW 318i	11th	10th											9th	10th			4
23	Aaron McGill	Ford Mondeo							12th	8th									3
24	Graham Dodd	Honda Accord							Ret	Ret							14th	10th	1
	Carlos Rolfo	BMW 318i			15th	17th			11th	Ret	Ret	DNS							
	Ric Shaw	Ford Mondeo					11th	Ret											
	Paul Nelson	BMW 318i															13th	14th	
	Craig Bradshaw	BMW 318i			14th	14th													
	Claude Elias	Hyundai Elantra			17th	15th													
	Milton Leslight	Toyota Carina	Ret	DNS	16th	16th	Ret	DNS	DNS	DNS									
	Malcolm Rea	Toyota Carina									Ret	Ret			Ret	Ret	Ret	DNS	
	Mike Fitzgerald	Peugeot 405 Mi16															Ret	DNS	
	Warren Luff	Ford Mondeo															DNS	DNS	
Pos	Driver	Car	Calder		Oran Park		Phillip Is.		Eastern Cr.		Lakeside		Mallala		Winton		Oran Park		Pts

Colour	Result
Gold	Winner
Silver	Second place
Bronze	Third place
Green	Points classification
Blue	Non-points classification
Blue	Non-classified finish (NC)
Purple	Retired, not classified (Ret)
Red	Did not qualify (DNQ)
Red	Did not pre-qualify (DNPQ)
Black	Disqualified (DSQ)
White	Did not start (DNS)
White	Withdrew (WD)
White	Race cancelled (C)
Blank	Did not practice (DNP)
Blank	Did not arrive (DNA)
Blank	Excluded (EX)

=== Manufacturers Championship ===
Position	Manufacturer	Points
1	Audi	234
2	Volvo	186

=== Teams Championship ===
Position	Team	Points
1	Audi Sport Australia	204
2	Knight Racing	136

=== TOCA Challenge - Independents Cup ===
Independents Cup points were awarded on a 15-12-10-8-6-5-4-3-2-1 basis for relative positions achieved by drivers in entries nominated as Independents at each race.

The TOCA Challenge - Independents Cup was won by Cameron McLean in his Greenfield Mowers Racing-entered BMW 320i, scoring 205 points. Second was Mark Adderton on 151 points, and third was Peter Hills on 136 points.
