= 2000 Australian Super Touring Championship =

2000 ASTC season

Seasons
- ← 1999 2001 →

The 2000 Australian Super Touring Car Championship was a CAMS sanctioned motor racing competition open to Super Touring Cars. It was the eighth running of an Australian series for Super Touring Cars and the sixth to be contested under the Australian Super Touring Championship name. The series, which was promoted as the '2000 BOC Gases Australian Super Touring Championship', began on 28 May 2000 at Oran Park Raceway and ended on 11 February 2001 at Oran Park Raceway after eight rounds.

== Future Touring Cars ==
With Super Touring competitor numbers dropping after the withdrawal of the factory supported Audi and Volvo teams, the grids for the 2000 championship were bolstered with cars from the Future Touring Car category. This category, which catered for V8 powered cars that had competed previously in AUSCAR racing, made its debut in a support event to the 1999 Bathurst 500. While the Future Touring Cars and the Super Touring Cars raced together in the same events, drivers competed for two separate titles with separate points scoring for each category.

== Teams and drivers ==
The following teams and drivers competed in the 2000 Australian Super Touring Championship.

Team	Manufacturer	Car model	No	Driver
SUPER TOURING
Paul Morris Motorsport	BMW	320i	1	(Australia) Paul Morris
Paul Morris Motorsport	BMW	318i	73	(Australia) Owen Kelly
Aaron McGill Motorsport	Nissan	Primera	2	(Australia) Aaron McGill
Aaron McGill Motorsport	Ford	Mondeo	7	(Australia) Allan Letcher
Aaron McGill Motorsport	Ford	Mondeo	12	(Australia) Sam Dale
MPD Racing	BMW	318i	3	(Australia) Mike Downard
Anthony Robson	BMW	318i	5	(Australia) Anthony Robson
Christian D'Agostin	BMW	320i	08	(Australia) John Saunders
TC Motorsport	Peugeot	406	13	(New Zealand) Tony Newman (Australia) Dwayne Bewley (Australia) Mark Zonneveld
TC Motorsport	Peugeot	405 Mi16	22	(Australia) Carlos Rolfo
Project Racing	Honda	Accord	14	(Australia) Jim Cornish
Knight Racing	Ford	Mondeo	19	(Australia) Alan Gurr
Knight Racing	Ford	Mondeo	68	(Australia) Mark Zonneveld
Knight Racing	Ford	Mondeo	88	(Australia) Peter Hills
M-F Racing	Peugeot	405 Mi16	21	(Australia) Mike Fitzgerald
Novacastrian Motorsport	BMW	320i	30	(Australia) Luke Searle
Gun Racing	Alfa Romeo	155 TS	45	(Australia) David Auger
John Henderson Racing	Opel	Vectra	56	(Australia) John Henderson
Hi-Tech Motorsport	Nissan	Primera	69	(Australia) Matthew Fox (Australia) Kiel Johnston (Australia) Alan Gurr
Motorsport Developments	Toyota	Carina	77	(Australia) Malcolm Rea
Motorsport Developments	Toyota	Carina	99	(Australia) Brad Stratton
Phoenix Motorsport	Toyota	Camry	95	(Australia) Jamie Miller
Redline Motorsport	Hyundai	Lantra	97	(Australia) Paul Leabeater
FUTURE TOURING
SVO Motorsport	Ford	EL Falcon	6	(Australia) Michael Webb
Greg East	Mitsubishi	Magna Chevrolet	7	(Australia) Greg East
Bruce Williams Motorsport	Holden	VS Commodore	8	(Australia) Tim Shaw
Kerry Wade	Ford	EL Falcon	09	(Australia) Andrew Gillespie
Kerry Wade	Ford	EL Falcon	111	(Australia) Kerry Wade
Peter Hayward	Holden	VS Commodore	10	(Australia) Peter Hayward
Garry Holt	Holden	VS Commodore	10	(Australia) Garry Holt
Goanna Racing Team	Ford	EF Falcon	13	(Australia) Peter Wright
Amin Chahda	Ford	EF Falcon	18	(Australia) Amin Chahda
Diamond Valley Speed Shop	Holden	VT Commodore	22	(Australia) James Brock
Diamond Valley Speed Shop	Holden	VS Commodore	24	(Australia) James Brock
Pretty Motorsport	Holden	VS Commodore	32	(Australia) Mark Papendell
Christian D'Agostin	Holden	VS Commodore	37	(Australia) Christian D'Agostin
Brett Youlden	Holden	VS Commodore	54	(Australia) Brett Youlden
APS Racing	Holden	VT Commodore	84	(Australia) Ray Sidebottom
APS Racing	Holden	VS Commodore	85	(Australia) Ray Sidebottom (Australia) Jason Domaschenz

== Race Calendar ==
The 2000/2001 Australian Super Touring Championship was contested over an eight-round series. Three races were held at the first round and two races were held at all subsequent rounds. The Future Touring cars competed at seven of the eight rounds, with no entries being received for Round 2 at Lakeside International Raceway.

Rd./Race	Circuit	Location & State	Date	ST Winner	Team	FT Winner	Team
1/1	Oran Park Raceway	Sydney, New South Wales	27–28 May 2000	Paul Morris	Paul Morris Motorsport	Tim Shaw	Bruce Williams Motorsport
1/2	Oran Park Raceway	Sydney, New South Wales	27–28 May 2000	Paul Morris	Paul Morris Motorsport	Tim Shaw	Bruce Williams Motorsport
1/3	Oran Park Raceway	Sydney, New South Wales	27–28 May 2000	Paul Morris	Paul Morris Motorsport	Christian D'Agostin	Christian D'Agostin
2/1	Lakeside International Raceway	Brisbane, Queensland	17–18 Jun 2000	Paul Morris	Paul Morris Motorsport	N/A	N/A
2/2	Lakeside International Raceway	Brisbane, Queensland	17–18 Jun 2000	Paul Morris	Paul Morris Motorsport	N/A	N/A
3/1	Oran Park Raceway	Sydney, New South Wales	8–9 Jul 2000	Paul Morris	Paul Morris Motorsport	Tim Shaw	Bruce Williams Motorsport
3/2	Oran Park Raceway	Sydney, New South Wales	8–9 Jul 2000	Paul Morris	Paul Morris Motorsport	Tim Shaw	Bruce Williams Motorsport
4/1	Wakefield Park	Goulburn, New South Wales	28–29 Oct 2000	Paul Morris	Paul Morris Motorsport	Jason Domaschenz	APS Racing
4/2	Wakefield Park	Goulburn, New South Wales	28–29 Oct 2000	Paul Morris	Paul Morris Motorsport	Tim Shaw	Bruce Williams Motorsport
5/1	Mallala Motor Sport Park	Mallala, South Australia	11–12 Nov 2000	Paul Morris	Paul Morris Motorsport	Kerry Wade	Kerry Wade
5/2	Mallala Motor Sport Park	Mallala, South Australia	11–12 Nov 2000	Paul Morris	Paul Morris Motorsport	Jason Domaschenz	APS Racing
6/1	Symmons Plains Raceway	Launceston, Tasmania	2–3 Dec 2000	Paul Morris	Paul Morris Motorsport	James Brock	Diamond Valley Speed Shop
6/2	Symmons Plains Raceway	Launceston, Tasmania	2–3 Dec 2000	Paul Morris	Paul Morris Motorsport	Tim Shaw	Bruce Williams Motorsport
7/1	Wakefield Park	Goulburn, New South Wales	27–28 Jan 2001	Jim Cornish	Project Racing	Tim Shaw	Bruce Williams Motorsport
7/2	Wakefield Park	Goulburn, New South Wales	27–28 Jan 2001	Paul Morris	Paul Morris Motorsport	Ray Sidebottom	APS Racing
8/1	Oran Park Raceway	Sydney, New South Wales	10–11 Feb 2001	Paul Morris	Paul Morris Motorsport	Ray Sidebottom	APS Racing
8/2	Oran Park Raceway	Sydney, New South Wales	10–11 Feb 2001	Paul Morris	Paul Morris Motorsport	Tim Shaw	Bruce Williams Motorsport

== Points system ==
Points were awarded on a 15-12-10-8-6-5-4-3-2-1 basis for the top ten race positions in each race. A bonus point was allocated for the fastest lap time set in each qualifying session, with the first three rounds including a separate qualifying session for each race and the remaining rounds each featuring only a single qualifying session.

== Results ==
=== Drivers Championship ===
Pos	Driver	ORA 1	ORA 2	ORA 3	LAK 1	LAK 2	ORA 1	ORA 2	WAK 1	WAK 2	MAL 1	MAL 2	SYM 1	SYM 2	WAK 1	WAK 2	ORA 1	ORA 2	Pts
SUPER TOURING
1	Paul Morris	1st	1st	1st	1st	1st	1st	1st	1st	1st	1st	1st	1st	1st	Ret	1st	1st	1st	255
2	John Henderson	2nd	6th	Ret	2nd	DNS	2nd	2nd	2nd	2nd	2nd	3rd	3rd	3rd	5th	DNS	2nd	3rd	146
3	David Auger	4th	2nd	3rd	5th	3rd	4th	7th	5th	8th	4th	5th	5th	5th	7th	3rd	Ret	5th	113
4	Peter Hills	3rd	DSQ	2nd	Ret	DNS	5th	6th	3rd	3rd	3rd	2nd	11th	10th	4th	9th	4th	4th	109
5	Alan Gurr	Ret	12th	4th	3rd	2nd	3rd	3rd	4th	6th	5th	4th					3rd	Ret	87
6	Luke Searle	5th	Ret	Ret	7th	4th	Ret	5th	7th	7th	Ret	6th	7th	4th	2nd	Ret	5th	Ret	67
7	Owen Kelly												2nd	2nd	3rd	2nd	9th	2nd	63
8	Jamie Miller	6th	Ret	5th			Ret	DNS	6th	5th			4th	8th	6th	5th	Ret	6th	51
9	Allan Letcher	7th	3rd	7th	6th	7th	10th	11th											31
10	Jim Cornish				4th	5th	Ret	Ret			Ret	DNS	Ret	6th	1st	Ret	Ret	DNS	30
=	Aaron McGill	Ret	4th	6th	9th	Ret	6th	Ret	Ret	Ret	6th	14th	12th	Ret	DNS	DNS	11th	Ret	30
12	Mark Zonneveld										Ret	7th	6th	7th	Ret	DNS	Ret	12th	17
13	Mike Downard	13th	5th	10th	10th	8th													14
14	Sam Dale								14th	9th					9th	7th	Ret	DNS	13
15	Dwayne Bewley						14th	4th											10
16	Matthew Fox								13th	17th	13th	13th							9
17	Paul Leabeater	11th	11th	14th	11th	Ret	Ret	Ret							Ret	DNS			8
=	Tony Newman	Ret	Ret	Ret					Ret	4th									8
19	John Saunders										11th	11th							7
20	Anthony Robson	Ret	Ret	Ret			13th	8th											6
21	Brad Stratton				Ret	6th													5
22	Carlos Rolfo	Ret	Ret	Ret	8th	Ret													3
23	Mike Fitzgerald	Ret	13th	Ret															2
FUTURE TOURING
1	Tim Shaw	8th	7th	9th			7th	9th	8th	15th	9th	10th	10th	9th	8th	6th	DSQ	7th	184
2	Jason Domaschenz						8th	10th	9th	10th	8th	8th	8th	11th	Ret	DNS			103
3	James Brock	Ret	10th	12th			Ret	DNS	Ret	14th	10th	12th	7th	12th	Ret	DNS	8th	9th	85
4	Ray Sidebottom	12th	Ret	Ret					11th	13th	Ret	DNS	Ret	DNS	10th	4th	6th	8th	78
5	Kerry Wade						11th	13th	Ret	11th	7th	9th			Ret	DNS	7th	10th	75
6	Christian D'Agostin	9th	DSQ	8th			9th	12th	10th	12th									67
7	Michael Webb	10th	8th	11th											11th	8th			50
8	Andrew Gillespie								12th	16th	12th	Ret					10th	11th	30
9	Mark Papendell														12th	10th			16
10	Garry Holt						12th	14th											12
NC	Peter Hayward	14th	9th	13th															0
NC	Peter Wright	15th	Ret	Ret															0
Pos	Driver	ORA 1	ORA 2	ORA 3	LAK 1	LAK 2	ORA 1	ORA 2	WAK 1	WAK 2	MAL 1	MAL 2	SYM 1	SYM 2	WAK 1	WAK 2	ORA 1	ORA 2	Pts

Colour	Result
Gold	Winner
Silver	Second place
Bronze	Third place
Green	Points classification
Blue	Non-points classification
Blue	Non-classified finish (NC)
Purple	Retired, not classified (Ret)
Red	Did not qualify (DNQ)
Red	Did not pre-qualify (DNPQ)
Black	Disqualified (DSQ)
White	Did not start (DNS)
White	Withdrew (WD)
White	Race cancelled (C)
Blank	Did not practice (DNP)
Blank	Did not arrive (DNA)
Blank	Excluded (EX)

Note: Alan Gurr retained third place in Race 1 of the final round despite losing his championship points as a consequence of his involvement in an on-track incident with Jamie Miller's Toyota.

=== Independents Cup ===
A separate award was reserved for Super Touring drivers who were classified as "Independents".

Position	Driver	Points
1	David Auger	218
2	Luke Searle	135
3	Jamie Miller	111
4	Allan Letcher	66
5	Jim Cornish	49
6	Michael Downard	33
7	Matthew Fox	32
8	Sam Dale	30
9	Paul Leabeater	24
10	John Saunders	22
11	Anthony Robson	20
12	Brad Stratton	8
13	Carlos Rolfo	6
=	Mike Fitzgerald	6

=== Teams Championship ===
Multi-car Super Touring teams also competed for a Teams Championship.

Position	Team	Points
1	Knight Racing	312
2	Paul Morris Motorsport	144
3	Hi-Tech Motorsport	131
4	McGill Motorsport	112
5	Motorsport Developments	12

== See also ==
- 2000 Australian Touring Car season
