= 1999 Australian Super Touring Championship =

Super Touring Championship in Australia

1999 ASTC season

Seasons
- ← 1998 2000 →

The 1999 Australian Super Touring Championship was an Australian motor racing competition for Super Touring Cars. It began on 18 April 1999 at Lakeside International Raceway and ended on 29 August at Calder Park Raceway after eight rounds and twenty one races. Promoted as the BOC Gases Australian Touring Car Championship, organised by TOCA Australia and sanctioned by the Confederation of Australian Motor Sport as an Australian Title, it was the seventh annual Australian championship for Super Touring Cars and the fifth to carry the Australian Super Touring Championship name.

Paul Morris won the Drivers Championship, Volvo won the Manufacturers Championship and Volvo Racing was awarded the Teams Championship.

== Teams and drivers ==
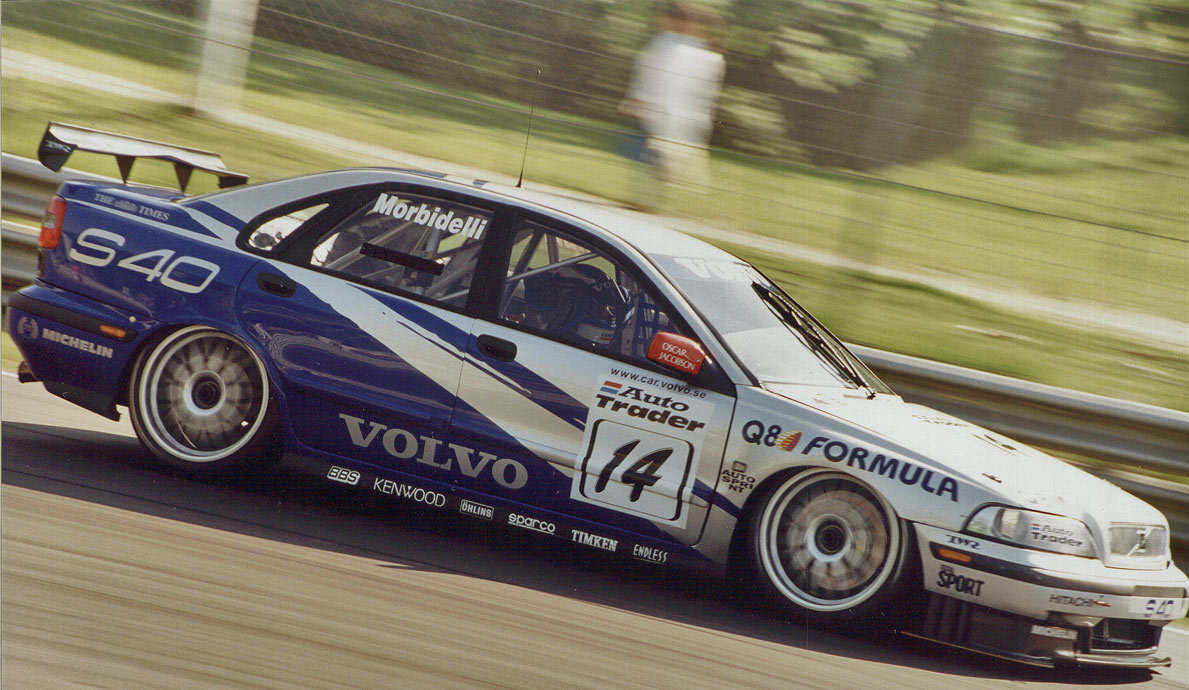
Jim Richards placed second in the Drivers Championship with a Volvo S40 similar to the example pictured. Volvo won the Manufacturers Championship and Volvo Racing was awarded the Teams Championship.

The following drivers competed in the 1999 Australian Super Touring Championship.

Team	Car	No	Driver
Audi Sport Australia	Audi A4	1	(Australia) Brad Jones
Audi Sport Australia	Audi A4	2	(Australia) Matthew Coleman
Volvo Racing	Volvo S40	3	(New Zealand) Jim Richards
Volvo Racing	Volvo S40	4	(Australia) Mark Williamson (Australia) Mark Adderton (Australia) Cameron McLean
Anthony Robson	BMW 318i	5	(Australia) Anthony Robson
Anthony Robson	BMW 318i	7	(Australia) Allan Letcher
Project Racing (Racing Projects)	Honda Accord	5	(Australia) Anthony Robson
Project Racing (Racing Projects)	Honda Accord	7	(United Kingdom) Jamie Wall (Australia) Roger Townshend
Project Racing (Racing Projects)	Nissan Primera	8	(Australia) Jim Cornish
Aaron McGill Motorsport	Ford Mondeo	9	(Australia) Aaron McGill
TC Motorsport	Peugeot 406	10	(New Zealand) Tony Newman
TC Motorsport	Peugeot 405	20	(Australia) Mark Zonneveld
AAP Racing	Toyota Carina	11	(Australia) Milton Leslight
Starion Enterprises	Peugeot 406	12	(United Kingdom) Patrick Watts
MPD Racing	BMW 318i	14	(Australia) Mike Downard
MF Racing	Peugeot 405	21	(Australia) Mike Fitzgerald
Paul Morris Motorsport	BMW 320i	23	(Australia) Paul Morris
Paul Morris Motorsport	BMW 320i	24	(Australia) John Teulan
Novacastrian Motorsport	BMW 320i	30	(Australia) Luke Searle (Australia) Troy Searle
Nigel Stones	Hyundai Lantra	37	(Australia) Nigel Stones
Knight Racing (Team Mondeo)	Ford Mondeo	44	(Australia) Dean Canto
Knight Racing (Team Mondeo)	Ford Mondeo	88	(Australia) Peter Hills
Gun Racing	Alfa Romeo 155 TS	45	(Australia) David Auger
John Henderson Racing	Opel Vectra	56	(Australia) John Henderson
Motorsport Developments	Toyota Carina	77	(Australia) Malcolm Rea
Triple P Racing	Hyundai Lantra	97	(Australia) Claude Elias

== Results and standings ==
=== Race calendar ===
The 1999 Australian Super Touring Championship consisted of twenty one races at eight rounds held in four different states. Two races were held at each of the first three rounds and three races were held at each of the remaining five rounds.

Rd.	Race	Race title	Circuit	Location	Date	Winner	Team	Report
1	1	(Australia) Lakeside	Lakeside International Raceway	Brisbane, Queensland	17–18 Apr	Paul Morris	Paul Morris Motorsport	
1	2	(Australia) Lakeside	Lakeside International Raceway	Brisbane, Queensland	17–18 Apr	Patrick Watts	Starion Enterprises	
2	1	(Australia) Oran Park	Oran Park Raceway	Sydney, New South Wales	1–2 May	Jim Richards	Volvo Cars Australia	
2	2	(Australia) Oran Park	Oran Park Raceway	Sydney, New South Wales	1–2 May	Jim Richards	Volvo Cars Australia	
3	1	(Australia) Mallala	Mallala Motor Sport Park	Mallala, South Australia	29–30 May	Paul Morris	Paul Morris Motorsport	
3	2	(Australia) Mallala	Mallala Motor Sport Park	Mallala, South Australia	29–30 May	Paul Morris	Paul Morris Motorsport	
4	1	(Australia) Winton	Winton Motor Raceway	Benalla, Victoria	19–20 Jun	Brad Jones	Brad Jones Racing	
4	2	(Australia) Winton	Winton Motor Raceway	Benalla, Victoria	19–20 Jun	Paul Morris	Paul Morris Motorsport	
4	3	(Australia) Winton	Winton Motor Raceway	Benalla, Victoria	19–20 Jun	Jim Richards	Volvo Cars Australia	
5	1	(Australia) Oran Park	Oran Park Raceway	Sydney, New South Wales	17–18 Jul	Paul Morris	Paul Morris Motorsport	
5	2	(Australia) Oran Park	Oran Park Raceway	Sydney, New South Wales	17–18 Jul	Paul Morris	Paul Morris Motorsport	
5	3	(Australia) Oran Park	Oran Park Raceway	Sydney, New South Wales	17–18 Jul	Paul Morris	Paul Morris Motorsport	
6	1	(Australia) Queensland Raceway	Queensland Raceway	Ipswich, Queensland	31 Jul – 1 Aug	Jim Richards	Volvo Cars Australia	
6	2	(Australia) Queensland Raceway	Queensland Raceway	Ipswich, Queensland	31 Jul – 1 Aug	Paul Morris	Paul Morris Motorsport	
6	3	(Australia) Queensland Raceway	Queensland Raceway	Ipswich, Queensland	31 Jul – 1 Aug	Jim Richards	Volvo Cars Australia	
7	1	(Australia) Oran Park	Oran Park Raceway	Sydney, New South Wales	14–15 Aug	Paul Morris	Paul Morris Motorsport	
7	2	(Australia) Oran Park	Oran Park Raceway	Sydney, New South Wales	14–15 Aug	Jim Richards	Volvo Cars Australia	
7	3	(Australia) Oran Park	Oran Park Raceway	Sydney, New South Wales	14–15 Aug	Jim Richards	Volvo Cars Australia	
8	1	(Australia) Calder Park	Calder Park Raceway	Melbourne, Victoria	28–29 Aug	Jim Richards	Volvo Cars Australia	
8	2	(Australia) Calder Park	Calder Park Raceway	Melbourne, Victoria	28–29 Aug	Jim Richards	Volvo Cars Australia	
8	3	(Australia) Calder Park	Calder Park Raceway	Melbourne, Victoria	28–29 Aug	Jim Richards	Volvo Cars Australia	
NC	1	(Australia) Bob Jane T-Marts Super Touring 100	Mount Panorama Circuit	Bathurst, New South Wales	2–3 Oct	Jim Richards	Volvo Cars Australia	Report
NC	2	(Australia) Bob Jane T-Marts Super Touring 500	Mount Panorama Circuit	Bathurst, New South Wales	2–3 Oct	Paul Morris	Paul Morris Motorsport	Report

=== Drivers Championship ===
Points were awarded 15–12–10–8–6–5–4–3–2–1 based on the top ten race positions in each race. There was a bonus point allocated for pole position. The first three race meetings had a qualifying session for each race. After that there was just one qualifying session per round.

Pos	Driver	Car	LAK 1	LAK 2	ORA 1	ORA 2	MAL 1	MAL 2	WIN 1	WIN 2	WIN 3	ORA 3	ORA 4	ORA 5	QLD 1	QLD 2	QLD 3	ORA 6	ORA 7	ORA 8	CAL 1	CAL 2	CAL 3	Pts
1	Paul Morris	BMW 320i	1st	2nd	3rd	Ret	1st	1st	3rd	1st	2nd	1st	1st	1st	2nd	1st	3rd	1st	2nd	2nd	2nd	2nd	2nd	264
2	Jim Richards	Volvo S40	2nd	3rd	1st	1st	2nd	2nd	2nd	Ret	1st	2nd	2nd	DNS	1st	2nd	1st	2nd	1st	1st	1st	1st	1st	262
3	Brad Jones	Audi A4	3rd	4th	4th	3rd	7th	4th	1st	2nd	4th	3rd	3rd	Ret	3rd	3rd	2nd	7th	4th	3rd	3rd	3rd	4th	186
4	Matthew Coleman	Audi A4	4th	5th	6th	4th	3rd	3rd	4th	3rd	3rd	4th	4th	2nd	4th	4th	DNS	3rd	5th	6th	DSQ	5th	5th	156
5	Peter Hills	Ford Mondeo	5th	6th	5th	5th	5th	5th	6th	5th	6th	6th	5th	4th	7th	6th	5th	6th	6th	5th	Ret	8th	6th	109
6	Mark Adderton	Volvo S40					Ret	6th	Ret	Ret	5th	5th	9th	3rd	5th	5th	4th	4th	3rd	4th				75
7	Dean Canto	Ford Mondeo	DNS	DNS	8th	7th	Ret	7th	5th	8th	8th	7th	Ret	5th	6th	Ret	DNS	5th	8th	7th	4th	7th	8th	66
8	Anthony Robson	BMW 318i Honda Accord	11th	10th	13th	Ret	Ret	11th	7th	6th	7th	Ret	8th	6th	8th	7th	6th	8th	7th	Ret	8th	9th	9th	47
9	Patrick Watts	Peugeot 406	DNS	1st	2nd	2nd																		40
10	John Henderson	Opel Vectra; Holden Vectra	8th	Ret	9th	10th	4th	Ret	Ret	4th	DNS				DNS	DNS	DNS				5th	6th	7th	38
11	Tony Newman	Peugeot 406	DNS	DNS	11th	12th	9th	8th	Ret	Ret	12th	8th	7th	7th	9th	8th	7th	10th	9th	8th	7th	Ret	DNS	34
12	David Auger	Alfa Romeo 155 TS	9th	9th	10th	13th	6th	9th	DNS	Ret	9th	9th	6th	Ret	Ret	DNS	11th	9th	11th	9th	10th	10th	Ret	26
13	Cameron McLean	Volvo S40																			6th	4th	3rd	23
14	Mark Williamson	Volvo S40	6th	8th	7th	6th																		17
15	Aaron McGill	Ford Mondeo	DNS	DNS	14th	8th	8th	14th	8th	7th	11th	17th	11th	8th	11th	11th	9th	Ret	Ret	Ret	11th	12th	11th	15
16	Luke Searle	BMW 320i	10th	11th					9th	Ret	10th	10th	10th	9th							9th	11th	10th	10
17	Jamie Wall	Honda Accord	7th	7th																				8
18	Jim Cornish	Nissan Primera	Ret	12th	12th	11th	11th	10th	Ret	DNS	DNS	15th	Ret	10th	10th	10th	Ret	12th	Ret	Ret	DNS	DNS	DNS	5
19	Roger Townshend	Honda Accord			16th	9th																		3
19	Malcolm Rea	Toyota Carina E	13th	13th					10th	9th	13th													3
19	Mark Zonneveld	Peugeot 405										11th	Ret	DNS	Ret	DNS	8th	Ret	12th	12th	Ret	DNS	DNS	3
19	Troy Searle	BMW 320i			DNS	DNS	12th	12th							Ret	9th	13th	11th	10th	Ret				3
23	Milton Leslight	Toyota Carina	12th	14th	DNS	DNS	10th	13th	Ret	DNS	DNS	DNS	DNS	DNS	13th	12th	12th	13th	14th	11th	Ret	13th	Ret	1
23	Claude Elias	Hyundai Lantra			Ret	Ret			11th	10th	14th	16th	15th	11th				14th	DNS	13th				1
23	John Teulan	BMW 320i													12th	13th	10th							1
23	Nigel Stones	Hyundai Lantra			15th	Ret						12th	13th	12th				Ret	13th	10th				1
Pos	Driver	Car	LAK 1	LAK 2	ORA 1	ORA 2	MAL 1	MAL 2	WIN 1	WIN 2	WIN 3	ORA 3	ORA 4	ORA 5	QLD 1	QLD 2	QLD 3	ORA 6	ORA 7	ORA 8	CAL 1	CAL 2	CAL 3	Pts

Colour	Result
Gold	Winner
Silver	Second place
Bronze	Third place
Green	Points classification
Blue	Non-points classification
Blue	Non-classified finish (NC)
Purple	Retired, not classified (Ret)
Red	Did not qualify (DNQ)
Red	Did not pre-qualify (DNPQ)
Black	Disqualified (DSQ)
White	Did not start (DNS)
White	Withdrew (WD)
White	Race cancelled (C)
Blank	Did not practice (DNP)
Blank	Did not arrive (DNA)
Blank	Excluded (EX)

=== Manufacturers Championship ===
Manufacturers Championship points were awarded on a 15–12–10–8–6–5–4–3–2–1 basis for relative positions achieved by the best placed car from each eligible manufacturer at each race. Only two manufacturers were eligible to score points in the 1999 championship.

Position	Manufacturer	Lak	Ora	Mal	Win	Ora	Que	Ora	Cal	Total
1	Volvo	30	30	30	27	42	45	45	45	294
2	Audi	24	24	24	42	39	36	36	36	261

=== Teams Championship ===
Teams Championship points were awarded on a 15–12–10–8–6–5–4–3–2–1 basis for relative positions achieved by entries from multi-car teams at each race.

Position	Team	Lak	Ora	Mal	Win	Ora	Que	Ora	Cal	Total
1	Volvo Racing	41	42	36	35	54	62	58	79	407
2	Audi Sport Australia	42	44	42	74	59	48	43	45	397
3	Team Mondeo	16	28	23	40	37	20	29	26	219
4	Paul Morris Motorsport	–	–	–	–	–	40	39	36	115
5	Racing Projects	16	13	13	18	17	15	8	9	109
6	TC Motorsport	–	–	–	–	17	13	10	4	44

=== TOCA Challenge – Independents Cup ===
Independents Cup points were awarded on a 15–12–10–8–6–5–4–3–2–1 basis for relative positions achieved by drivers in entries nominated as Independents at each race.

Position	Driver	No.	Car	Entrant	Lak	Ora	Mal	Win	Ora	Que	Ora	Cal	Total
1	Peter Hills	88	Ford Mondeo	Peter Hills	27	24	28	39	46	42	42	25	273
2	Dean Canto	44	Ford Mondeo	Peter Hills	–	20	12	31	24	15	38	38	178
3	Anthony Robson	5	BMW 318i Honda Accord	Grid Motorsport; Nigel Barclay	11	4	6	32	18	35	22	24	152
4	Tony Newman	10	Peugeot 406	TC Motorsports	–	8	16	4	28	28	24	10	118
5	David Auger	45	Alfa Romeo 155	David Auger	16	7	19	8	20	4	21	16	111
6	John Henderson	56	Opel Vectra; Holden Vectra	John Henderson	10	14	15	16	–	–	–	39	94
7	Aaron McGill	9	Ford Mondeo	Aaron McGill	–	6	10	21	11	16	–	12	76
8	Luke Searle	30	BMW 320i	Roadchill Express	11	–	–	12	17	–	–	17	57
9	Patrick Watts	12	Peugeot 406	Starion Enterprises	17	32	–	–	–	–	–	–	49
10	Jim Cornish	8	Nissan Primera	Nigel Barclay	4	9	10	–	5	12	4	–	44
11	Milton Leslight	11	Toyota Carina	Milton Leslight	6	–	8	–	–	10	10	3	37
12	Troy Searle	30	BMW 320i	Roadchill Express	–	–	7	–	–	10	11	–	28
13	Jamie Wall	7	Honda Accord	Nigel Barclay	22	–	–	–	–	–	–	–	22
14	Mark Zonneveld	20	Ford Mondeo	TC Motorsports	–	–	–	–	5	8	8	–	21
15	Malcolm Rea	77	Toyota Carina E	Malcolm Rea	6	–	–	13	–	–	–	–	19
15	Claude Elias	97	Hyundai Lantra	Claude Elias	–	–	–	10	4	–	5	–	19
17	Nigel Stones	37	Hyundai Lantra	Nigel Stones	–	1	–	–	9	–	9	–	19
18	John Teulan	24	BMW 320i	Paul Morris Motorsport	–	–	–	–	–	12	–	–	12
19	Roger Townshend	7	Honda Accord	Nigel Barclay	–	8	–	–	–	–	–	–	8
20	Allan Letcher	7	BMW 318i	Grid Motorsport	–	–	–	–	7	–	–	–	7
21	Michael Downard	14	BMW 320i	MPD Racing	–	–	–	–	4	2	–	–	6
