= 2001 Australian Super Touring Series =

Seasons
- ← 2000 2002 →

The 2001 Australian Super Touring Car Series was a CAMS sanctioned motor racing competition open to Super Touring Cars. It was the ninth running of an Australian series for Super Touring Cars and the first to be contested under the Australian Super Touring Series name. The series, which was promoted as the '2001 Power Tour', began on 21 October 2001 at Winton Motor Raceway and ended on 25 November 2001 at Calder Park Raceway after two rounds.

== Future Touring Cars ==
With Super Touring competitor numbers dropping after the withdrawal of the factory supported Audi and Volvo teams, the grids for the 2001 championship were bolstered with cars from the Future Touring Car category. This category, which catered for V8 powered cars that had competed previously in AUSCAR racing, made its debut in a support event to the 1999 Bathurst 500. While the Future Touring Cars and the Super Touring Cars raced together in the same events, drivers competed for two separate titles with separate points scoring for each category.

== Teams and drivers ==
The following teams and drivers competed in the 2001 Australian Super Touring Championship.

Team	Manufacturer	Car model	No	Driver
Knight Racing	Ford	Mondeo	19	(Australia) Sam Dale
Knight Racing	Ford	Mondeo	31	(Australia) Grant Johnson
Knight Racing	Ford	Mondeo	88	(Australia) Peter Hills
SAE Racing	BMW	320i	30	(Australia) Luke Searle
Leatherman Racing	Alfa Romeo	155 TS	45	(Australia) David Auger
Phoenix Motorsport	Toyota	Camry	95	(Australia) Jamie Miller
Redline Motorsport	Hyundai	Lantra	97	(Australia) Paul Leabeater

== Race Calendar ==
The 2001 Australian Super Touring Championship was contested over a two-round series, with two races held at each round.

Rd./Race	Circuit	Location & State	Date	Winner	Team
1/1	Winton Motor Raceway	Benalla, Victoria	21 Oct 2001	Peter Hills	Knight Racing
1/2	Winton Motor Raceway	Benalla, Victoria	21 Oct 2001	Peter Hills	Knight Racing
2/1	Calder Park Raceway	Melbourne, Victoria	25 Nov 2001	Grant Johnson	Knight Racing
2/2	Calder Park Raceway	Melbourne, Victoria	25 Nov 2001	Peter Hills	Knight Racing

== Points system ==
Points were awarded on a 15-12-10-8-6-5-4-3-2-1 basis for the top ten race positions in each race. A bonus point was allocated for the fastest lap time set in each qualifying session.

== Results ==
=== Drivers Championship ===
Pos	Driver	WIN 1	WIN 2	CAL 1	CAL 2	Pts
1	Peter Hills	1st	1st	2nd	1st	59
2	Luke Searle	3rd	2nd	4th	3rd	40
3	David Auger	5th	3rd	3rd	2nd	38
4	Jamie Miller	2nd	4th	6th	4th	33
5	Sam Dale	4th	5th	5th	Ret	20
6	Grant Johnson	Ret	Ret	1st	Ret	16
7	Paul Leabeater	6th	Ret	7th	5th	15
Pos	Driver	WIN 1	WIN 2	CAL 1	CAL 2	Pts

Colour	Result
Gold	Winner
Silver	Second place
Bronze	Third place
Green	Points classification
Blue	Non-points classification
Blue	Non-classified finish (NC)
Purple	Retired, not classified (Ret)
Red	Did not qualify (DNQ)
Red	Did not pre-qualify (DNPQ)
Black	Disqualified (DSQ)
White	Did not start (DNS)
White	Withdrew (WD)
White	Race cancelled (C)
Blank	Did not practice (DNP)
Blank	Did not arrive (DNA)
Blank	Excluded (EX)

== See also ==
- 2001 Australian Touring Car season
