= Alan Gurr =

Australian retired V8 Supercars driver (born 1982)

- Nationality: Australian
- Born: 3 February 1982 (age 44) Sydney, New South Wales
- Retired: 2007

V8 Supercar
- Years active: 2003-07
- Teams: Paul Morris Motorsport; Britek Motorsport
- Starts: 27

Previous series
- 2000-02 2001 2003 2004: Australian Super Touring Championship; Australian Drivers' Champ. Australian Formula 3 Championship; Konica V8 Supercar Series

Championship titles
- 2002: Australian Super Touring Series

Alan Rodney Gurr (born 3 February 1982) is an Australian retired V8 Supercars driver. Gurr was a young karting star both on a national and international level who graduated through the Junior ranks to V8 Supercars with immediate results winning on debut in the V8 Development series. He was the teammate of Jason Bright at Britek Motorsport in 2007. He has also driven for Team Sirromet Wines in the 2006 V8 Supercar Championship Series as well as Holden Young Lions in 2004.

In the 2007 Endurance Races, Gurr was partnered with Warren Luff in car 26. After the 2007 season, he retired with recurring injuries from a serious accident earlier in his career. He was replaced by Marcus Marshall in the #26 Irwin backed Ford, and he has since not raced in the series.

Gurr has since competed in the Sportsman Endurance Karting series in both Queensland and New South Wales, with the CNH Racing Team, alongside Craig Nissen, and Aussie Racing Cars driver Hayden Nissen, winning the SEK National Titles twice in a row in 2024 in Port Macquarie and 2025 in Warwick.

== Career results ==
Season	Series	Position	Car	Team
2000/01	Australian Super Touring Championship	5th	Ford Mondeo; Nissan Primera	Knight Racing; Hi-Tech Motorsport
2001	Australian Drivers Championship	3rd	Reynard 94D Holden	Ralt Australia
2002	Australian Super Touring Series	1st	BMW 320i	NEMO Racing
2003	Australian Formula 3 Championship	8th	Dallara F301 Alfa Romeo	Piccola Scuderia Corse
2003	V8 Supercar Championship Series	67th	Holden VX Commodore	Paul Morris Motorsport; Robert Smith Racing
2004	Konica Minolta V8 Supercar Series	14th	Holden VX Commodore	Robert Smith Racing; Holden Young Lions
2004	V8 Supercar Championship Series	62nd	Holden VY Commodore	Paul Morris Motorsport
2005	Australian Carrera Cup Championship	10th	Porsche 911 GT3 Cup Type 996	Glenfords / Hitachi / Sirromet
2005	V8 Supercar Championship Series	45th	Holden VZ Commodore	Team Kiwi Racing
2006	Fujitsu V8 Supercar Series	43rd	Holden VY Commodore	Project Mu
2006	V8 Supercar Championship Series	33rd	Holden VZ Commodore	Team Sirromet Wines
2007	V8 Supercar Championship Series	53rd	Ford BF Falcon	Britek Motorsport

=== Complete Bathurst 1000 results ===
Year	Team	Car	Co-driver	Position	Laps
2002	McDougall Motorsport	Holden VX Commodore	(Australia) Dugal McDougall	DNF	82
2003	Robert Smith Racing	Holden VX Commodore	(New Zealand) Jonny Reid	DNF	4
2004	Paul Morris Motorsport	Holden VY Commodore	(Australia) Paul Morris	DNF	50
2005	Team Kiwi Racing	Holden VZ Commodore	(New Zealand) John Faulkner	10th	158
2006	Paul Morris Motorsport	Holden VZ Commodore	(New Zealand) Kayne Scott	DNF	24
2007	Britek Motorsport	Ford BF Falcon	(Australia) Warren Luff	DNF	134
