= Australian Super Touring Championship =

Auto racing championship held in Australia

- Category: Super Touring
- Country: Australia
- Inaugural season: 1993
- Folded: 2002
- Last Drivers' champion: Alan Gurr
- Last Teams' champion: Knight Racing

The Australian Super Touring Championship (formerly known as the Australian 2.0 Litre Touring Car Championship) was a CAMS-sanctioned national motor racing title for Super Touring Cars.

== History ==
Super Touring was introduced into Australia in 1993 when CAMS replaced the existing Group 3A Touring Car category (which had been based on FIA Group A rules) with a new two-class Group 3A. This encompassed both 2.0 Litre FIA Class II Touring Cars and 5.0 Litre Touring Cars, which would later become known as Super Touring Cars and V8 Supercars respectively.

In their first year, the Class II cars were eligible to compete in both the Australian Touring Car Championship and in their own Australian 2.0 Litre Touring Car Championship which was run with the main series. This revived a name that had been used in 1986 & 1987 for a national title series for 2.0 Litre “Group A” Touring Cars. For 1994 the Class II cars contested their own separate series, the 1994 Australian Manufacturers' Championship, with both Drivers’ and Manufacturers’ titles awarded. 1995 saw the Super Touring name adopted for the category, the Australian Super Touring Championship name applied to the series and a Teams’ title added to the existing Drivers’ and Manufacturers’ awards.

The series was seen as an opportunity for manufacturer involvement in Australian racing since the 5.0-litre category was the exclusive domain of Ford and Holden under the regulations, in the hope, that manufacturers like BMW, Nissan and Toyota who had been involved in recent years of the preceding category, Group A might continue to race in Australia. Nissan showed no interest and wouldn't race full-time again in Australia until entering V8 Supercars in 2013. On the other hand, Toyota jumped immediately into the 1993 series with a two-car factory team run by Colin Bond, however after losing the title to a privateer BMW team, Toyota pulled out. BMW stepped into the series in 1994, with Audi, Hyundai and Volvo following in 1995 with both Ford and Holden giving back door support to privately operated teams on and off for the next three seasons. Hyundai did not stay beyond its first season. BMW and Audi alternated championship success from 1995 to 1998. BMW pulled out after the 1997 series. Both Audi and Volvo ended their involvement after the 1999 season, leaving the category as a privateer series which then rapidly dwindled.

After a small scale 2000 series where grids had been bolstered by the Future Touring category the series ceased to be self-supporting. In 2005 Super Touring cars were included in the class structure of the new Australian Touring Car Challenge series but were little more than one class among many and race wins, even in a handicap-based structure, became rare. By 2007 as little as one or two cars appeared at each race meeting, the category has all but disappeared.

== Technical development ==
The 2-litre Touring Car Formula, as it was initially called, was created by the BTCC engineers. Their concept was simple, to create a formula that would give new manufacturers the opportunity to enter the series and be able to compete against the more experienced manufacturers without the associated high costs of the existing Group A rules.

The changes would also give the rule-makers the opportunity to turn the complex multi-class British Touring Car Championship into a single class championship, allowing drivers to win from the front rather than from within individual classes.

To achieve their goals, the rules targeted the type of car most manufacturers produced, a mid-range 4-door family saloon with a 2-litre normally aspirated multi-valve engine having a minimum production run of 2500 in one year. To enable the cars to be easily recognised on the track, the rules dictated that the car's body shape had to remain the same as the production model, but most other areas of the car could be modified specifically for racing.

Under the bonnet, only the original engine block and head must remain from the production car but engine revs are limited to 8500 RPM to aid reliability and reduce costs. Racing transmissions and suspensions could be incorporated, but the suspension had to remain true to the original design of the road-going model. Closer racing was also engineered into the rules by having different weight limits for front- and rear-wheel drive, and by limiting overall wheel and tyre sizes, and by restricting each car to only six tyres per event.

== Championship winners ==
=== Drivers’ Championship ===
Year	Champion	Vehicle
1993^{1}	(Australia) Peter Doulman	BMW M3
1994^{2}	(Australia) Tony Longhurst	BMW 318i
1995	(Australia) Paul Morris	BMW 318i
1996	(Australia) Brad Jones	Audi A4 quattro
1997	(Australia) Paul Morris	BMW 320i
1998	(Australia) Brad Jones	Audi A4 quattro
1999	(Australia) Paul Morris	BMW 320i
2000	(Australia) Paul Morris	BMW 320i
2001	(Australia) Peter Hills	Ford Mondeo
2002	(Australia) Alan Gurr	BMW 320i

=== Manufacturers’ Championship ===
Year	Champion	Vehicle
1994^{2}	BMW (Australia) Pty Ltd	BMW 318i
1995	BMW (Australia) Pty Ltd	BMW 318i
1996	Audi Sport Australia	Audi A4 quattro
1997	BMW (Australia) Pty Ltd	BMW 320i
1998	Audi Sport Australia	Audi A4 quattro
1999	Volvo Australia Pty Ltd	Volvo S40

=== Teams’ Championship ===
Year	Champion	Vehicle
1995	BMW Motorsport	BMW 318i
1996	Audi Sport Australia	Audi A4 quattro
1997	BMW Motorsport	BMW 320i
1998	Audi Sport Australia	Audi A4 quattro
1999	Volvo Dealer Racing	Volvo S40
2000	Knight Racing	Ford Mondeo
2001	Knight Racing	Ford Mondeo
2002	Knight Racing	Ford Mondeo

Notes

- ^1 – Contested as the 1993 Australian 2.0 Litre Touring Car Championship
- ^2 – Contested as the 1994 Australian Manufacturers' Championship
