= Matthew Coleman =

Australian racing driver

- Nationality: Australian
- Born: 8 June 1973 (age 53)

Australian Super Touring Championship
- Years active: 1999
- Teams: Audi Sport Australia
- Starts: 20
- Wins: 0
- Podiums: 6
- Best finish: 4th in 1999

Previous series
- 1999 2000 2001 2002–11: Australian Super Touring Championship; Australian Nations Cup; Australian GT Production Car Championship; Australian Carrera Cup

Matthew Coleman (born 8 June 1973) is a former Australian racing car driver. He competed in various Australian championships including the Australian Super Touring Championship, the Australian GT Production Car Championship, the Australian Nations Cup Championship, Porsche Cup Australia and the Australian Carrera Cup.

== Results ==
In 1998, Coleman was Rookie of the Year in the Commodore Cup.

=== Career results ===
Season	Series	Position	Car	Entrant
1999	Australian Super Touring Championship	4th	Audi A4	Audi Sport Australia
2000	Australian Nations Cup Championship	14th	Porsche 911 GT3 Type 996	Matthew Coleman
2001	Australian GT Production Car Championship - Class B	11th	Volkswagen Beetle RSi	Volkswagen
2002	Porsche Cup Australia	1st	Porsche 911 GT3 Cup Type 996	Matt Coleman Racing
2003	Australian Carrera Cup Championship	6th	Porsche 911 GT3 Cup Type 996	Matt Coleman Racing
2004	Australian Carrera Cup Championship	25th	Porsche 911 GT3 Cup Type 996	Matt Coleman Racing
2006	Australian Carrera Cup Championship	25th	Porsche 911 GT3 Cup Type 996	Fitzgerald Racing
2011	Australian Carrera Cup Championship	8th	Porsche 911 GT3 Cup Type 997	Money Choice Motorsport

=== Complete Bathurst 1000 results ===
Year	Team	Car	Co-driver	Position	Laps
2002	Brad Jones Racing	Ford Falcon AU	(Australia) Andrew Jones	DNF	14
2005	Perkins Engineering	Holden Commodore VY	(Australia) Christian D'Agostin	DNF	135
