= Westpoint Corporation =

- Industry: Property development
- Defunct: February 2006
- Headquarters: Australia

Westpoint Corporation was the head company of the Western Australian based Westpoint Group of Companies ("Westpoint Group") which was primarily engaged in property development. It was placed into receivership in February 2006.
