= Paul Morris Motorsport =

Australian motor racing team

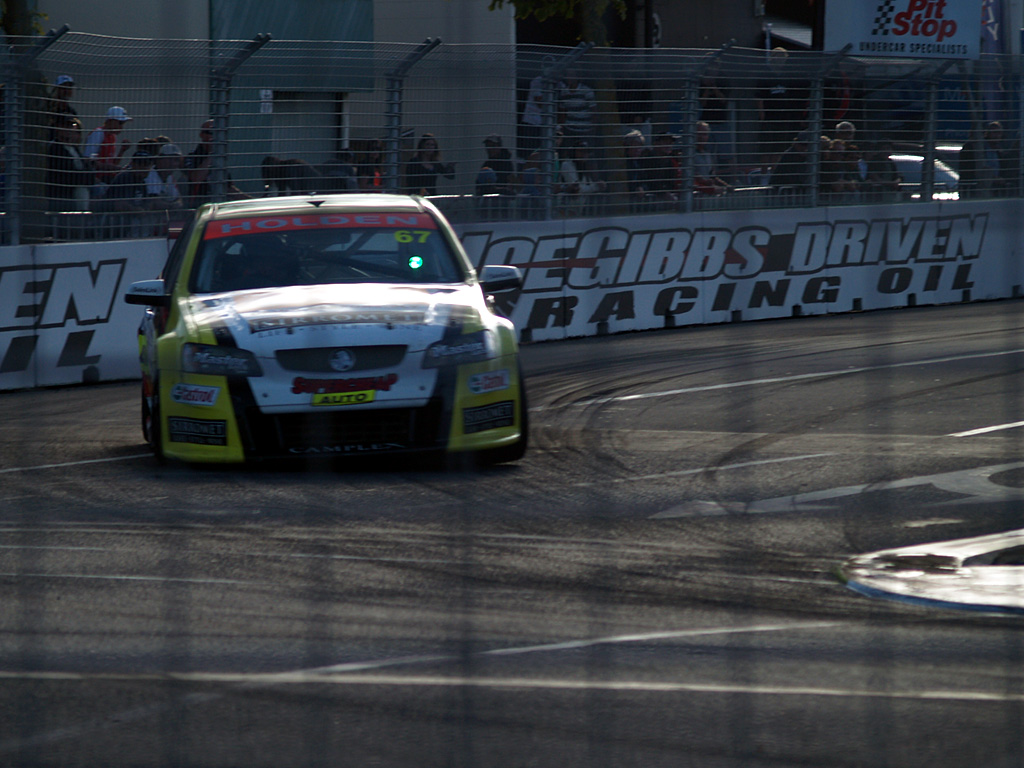
- Manufacturer: Ford; BMW; Holden
- Team Principal: Paul Morris
- Race Drivers: Paul Morris (1995–2014); Charlie O'Brien (1995–96); Geoff Brabham (1995–97); Craig Baird (1997); Matt Neal (2000, 2008); Kevin Schwantz (2000); Owen Kelly (2000, 2007, 2009); Aaron McGill (2000); Ashley Stichbury (2001); Wayne Wakefield (2002); John Faulkner (2003); Alan Gurr (2004, 2006); Paul Radisich (2005); Fabian Coulthard (2006–07); Steve Ellery (2006–07); Russell Ingall (2008–11); Boris Said (2008, 2011, 2012); Tim Slade (2009); Greg Murphy 2010; Tim Blanchard (2010); Allan Simonsen (2010); Yvan Muller (2010); Jack Perkins (2010–11); Steve Owen (2011–12); Jan Magnussen (2011)
- Chassis: BMW 320i Holden Commodore VS; Holden Commodore VT; Holden Commodore VX; Holden Commodore VY; Holden Commodore VZ; Holden Commodore VE; Ford Falcon FG
- Debut: 2000
- Drivers' Championships: 0
- Round wins: 1
- Race wins: 2
- 15th

Paul Morris Motorsport, also known as its business name of Nemo Racing, is an Australian motor racing team that competed in V8 Supercars between 2000 and 2012. The team also won the 1997 AMP Bathurst 1000 and four Australian Super Touring Championships. The team is based at the Norwell Motorplex in Norwell, Queensland and currently competes in the Super3 Series.

== Background ==
The team was born out of a split of LoGaMo Racing, owned by Tony Longhurst, Frank Gardner and Terry Morris. After the 1994 Australian Touring Car season, Longhurst wished to continue in the Australian Touring Car Championship while Gardner and Morris wanted to stick with the Australian Super Touring Championship. At the end of 1994, Gardner and Morris bought Longhurst out, with the latter forming Longhurst Racing to race a Ford Falcon EF in the 1995 Australian Touring Car Championship.

== History ==
=== Super Touring ===
In the LoGaMo days, the team had a long association with tobacco sponsorship. After 1994, this was not able to be renewed due to the Tobacco Advertising Prohibition Act 1992 and the Benson & Hedges sponsorship concluded at the end of 1994. For the next three years, the team competed in the Australian Super Touring Championship with Geoff Brabham and Paul Morris driving BMW 320is. Morris won the series in 1995 and 1997, while Brabham teamed with brother David to win the 1997 Bathurst 1000, after the Morris and Craig Baird entry had been disqualified. A third car was entered at some events in 1995 and 1996 for Charlie O'Brien and in 1997 for Baird.

At the end of 1997, BMW withdrew their support and the team closed. Gardner retired and sold the Performance Driving Centre in Norwell to Morris. After racing for PacWest Racing in the Indy Lights Championship in 1998, Morris reformed the team with Tim Neff, racing a BMW 320i to victory in the 1999 Australian Super Touring Championship, which he repeated in 2000.

=== V8 Supercars ===
==== Single-car origins ====
Morris entered the V8 Supercar series in 2000 with an ex-Holden Racing Team Commodore VS. The car was destroyed at the Oran Park round in 2000 when Morris was involved in a fiery crash with Mark Larkham at the start of one of the races. Later in the year the team upgraded to a Commodore VT purchased from James Rosenberg Racing.

In 2001, the team completed its first in-house built Commodore VX, not before winning the Calder Park round in the older VT model. It proved to be the only race and round victories for the team. The team generally raced one car until 2005, when it began preparing the Team Kiwi Racing car under a customer deal.

==== Expansion to two cars ====
In 2006, after purchasing a Level 1 licence from Tony Longhurst, it expanded to two cars with Fabian Coulthard, Alan Gurr, Steven Ellery, Jack Perkins and Shane Price sharing the No. 39 car. In 2007, Coulthard, Ellery and Owen Kelly drove the second car.

In 2008, Russell Ingall joined as the driver of the second car bringing title sponsorship from Supercheap Auto. At the end of the year, Morris retired and was replaced by Tim Slade in a deal brokered by former V8 Supercar team owner James Rosenberg, who also took on ownership of Slade's car.

In 2010, Greg Murphy replaced Tim Slade with backing from Castrol. The team moved away from self-built cars, buying two Triple Eight Race Engineering Commodore VEs.

In 2011, Murphy was replaced by Steve Owen.

==== Customer entry and demise ====
With Ingall and Supercheap Auto departing at the end of 2011, one REC was leased to Tekno Autosports while preparation of the remaining car was contracted to Dick Johnson Racing. The team's two Commodore VEs also passed to Tekno in exchange for a Ford Falcon FG. In 2013, the remaining REC was sold to Lucas Dumbrell Motorsport. At the end of the year, the leased REC was returned from Tekno Autosports and sold to Dick Johnson Racing. This signalled the end of the team after 13 years in the championship.

== Other racing activities ==
After Morris' full-time V8 Supercars career ended at the end of the 2008 season, his team entered the Development Series, later known as Super2, in every season up until 2018. Morris himself entered selected rounds from 2009 to 2015, while at its peak the team entered four cars in the 2015 season. The team won its only two championship rounds in 2017 with Anton De Pasquale at the wheel.

In 2019, the team withdrew from Super2 and instead entered in the newly renamed Super3 Series.

Paul Morris Motorsport manages trucks for the Stadium Super Trucks, with the Norwell Motorplex serving as the corporate headquarters for the series' Australian operations under the Boost Mobile Super Trucks name.

== Bathurst 1000 Results ==
Year	No.	Car	Drivers	Pos.	Laps
2000	29	Holden VT Commodore	(Australia) Paul Morris (United Kingdom) Matt Neal	12th	158
2000	67	Holden VS Commodore	(Australia) Owen Kelly (Australia) Aaron McGill	DNF	2
2001	29	Holden VT Commodore	(Australia) Paul Morris (New Zealand) Ashley Stichbury	12th	159
2002	29	Holden VX Commodore	(Australia) Paul Morris (Australia) Wayne Wakefield	DNF	135
2003	24	Holden VX Commodore	(Australia) Wayne Wakefield (New Zealand) Andy McLera	DNQ	0
2003	29	Holden VY Commodore	(Australia) Paul Morris (New Zealand) John Faulkner	DNF	5
2004	29	Holden VY Commodore	(Australia) Paul Morris (Australia) Alan Gurr	DNF	50

== Supercars drivers ==
The following is a list of drivers who have driven for the team in the Supercars Championship, in order of first appearance. Drivers who only drove for the team on a part-time basis are listed in italics

- (Australia) Paul Morris (2000–2012)
- (United States) Kevin Schwantz (2000)
- (United Kingdom) Matt Neal (2000–2001, 2008)
- (Australia) Owen Kelly (2000, 2007, 2009)
- (Australia) Aaron McGill (2000)
- (New Zealand) Ashley Stichbury (2001)
- (Australia) Wayne Wakefield (2002–2003)
- (Australia) Alan Gurr (2003–2004, 2006)
- (New Zealand) Andy McElrea (2003)
- (New Zealand) John Faulkner (2003)
- (New Zealand) Paul Radisich (2005)
- (New Zealand) Fabian Coulthard (2006–2007)
- (Australia) Steven Ellery (2006–2007)
- (Australia) Shane Price (2006)
- (Australia) Jack Perkins (2006, 2010–2011)
- (New Zealand) Kayne Scott (2006)
- (New Zealand) Chris Pither (2007)
- (Australia) Russell Ingall (2008–2011)
- (United States) Boris Said (2008, 2011–2012)
- (Australia) Tim Slade (2009)
- (New Zealand) Greg Murphy (2010)
- (Australia) Tim Blanchard (2010)
- (Denmark) Allan Simonsen (2010)
- (France) Yvan Muller (2010)
- (Australia) Steve Owen (2011–2012)
- (Denmark) Jan Magnussen (2011)

== Super2 drivers ==
The following is a list of drivers who have driven for the team in the Super2 Series, in order of first appearance. Drivers who only drove for the team on a part-time basis are listed in italics.

- (New Zealand) Colin Corkery (2009)
- (Australia) Paul Morris (2009–2015)
- (Australia) Phil Foster (2010)
- (Australia) Amber Anderson (2010)
- (Australia) Jack Perkins (2010)
- (Australia) Bryce Fullwood (2015)
- (Australia) Renee Gracie (2015–2016)
- (Australia) Aaren Russell (2015)
- (Australia) Drew Russell (2015)
- (Australia) Anton De Pasquale (2016–2017)
- (Australia) Jack Smith (2016)
- (Australia) Shae Davies (2018)
- (Australia) Nash Morris (2022–2023)

== Super3 drivers ==
The following is a list of drivers who have driven for the team in the Super3 Series, in order of first appearance. Drivers who only drove for the team on a part-time basis are listed in italics.

- (Australia) Broc Feeney (2019)
- (Australia) Nash Morris (2021)
