= Brad Jones Racing =

Australian racing team

- Manufacturer: Supercars; Toyota; Super2; Holden
- Team Principal: Brad Jones
- Team Manager: Chris Westwood
- Race Drivers: Supercars: 8. Andre Heimgartner; 14. Cameron Hill; 96. Macauley Jones; Super2: 2. Matt Hillyer; 80. Brad Vaughan
- Race Engineers: Supercars: 8. Phil Keed; 14. Jason Booney; 96. Randall Chua; Super2: 2. Jake Burton; 80. Matthew Boniface
- Chassis: Supercars: GR Supra; Super2: ZB Commodore
- Debut: 2000
- Drivers' Championships: 0
- Round wins: 2
- Race wins: 11
- 2021 position: 14
- 8/14: 6th (3521 pts); 4/96: 10th (2013 pts)

Brad Jones Racing is an Australian motor racing team owned by Brad Jones based in Albury. The team competes in the Supercars Championship and the Super2 Series. The team is the only rurally based Supercars team. The team's current drivers are Andre Heimgartner, Cameron Hill and Macauley Jones. The team races three Toyota GR Supras in the Supercars Championship and a pair of Holden ZB Commodores in the Super2 Series.

== History ==
Brad Jones Racing began as a Formula Ford team in which both Brad and Kim Jones raced. Kim stopped racing relatively early, partially in recognition of Brad's ability as a driver with Kim becoming team manager. The team's peak in open-wheel racing came when, running an Elwyn chassis, Brad finished sixth in the 1981 TAA Formula Ford Driver to Europe Series. The pair faded as the 1980s developed, though Brad Jones would continue driving Bryan Thompson's twin-turbo Mercedes-Benz 450 SLC - Chevrolet in Sports Sedan and GT racing.

When Thompson came out of driving retirement in 1983, Brad Jones moved into driving a Mitsubishi Starion in Group E Series Production Touring Cars. Jones and the turbocharged Starion came to almost dominate Group E racing in Australia during 1983 and 1984 which led to the Jones brothers becoming involved in Kevin Bartlett's Mitsubishi touring car team, known occasionally as Mitsubishi Ralliart. Racing with Mitsubishi gave Brad several opportunities to race overseas, racing the Starion turbos in Australia, Japan and across Asia. During this time, Brad Jones again linked with Bryan Thompson to drive both the Mercedes Chev and a Chevrolet Monza to 2nd place (behind Thompson who also drove both cars) in the 1985 Australian GT Championship. Jones also drove the Monza in selected races throughout 1986, mostly at their "local" track, the Winton Motor Raceway.

After Kevin Bartlett severed ties with Mitsubishi in late 1985, the Jones brothers formed their own team BJ Motorsport to further the Starion touring car operation, qualifying the Starion 10th at the 1986 James Hardie 1000 after being fastest on the 1.9 kilometre long Conrod Straight during qualifying at 269 km/h (167 mph). By the end of 1986, the Starion, despite its straight-line speed, had faded as a truly competitive touring car and Brad Jones become a hired gun driver for other touring car teams. The Ralliart Australia team was revived in 1987, though Brad Jones was surprisingly overlooked for a seat at the 1987 James Hardie 1000. He was back with the team for the 1988 Tooheys 1000 which saw his best result to date in the Bathurst 1000 when he and former Nissan driver Terry Shiel drove the aging Starion to 10th place. He was then hired to race the full 1989 Australian Touring Car season in a turbocharged Ford Sierra RS500 for Peter Brock's Mobil 1 Racing. During the 1990s, Brad Jones was hired to drive in the late season endurance races at Sandown and Bathurst for the Holden Racing Team, Wayne Gardner Racing and Larkham Motor Sport.

== Australian Stock Car Auto Racing ==
A way forward emerged with the creation of AUSCAR racing in Australia with the newly redeveloped Brad Jones Racing one of the first teams involved in the fledgling stock car series running Holden Commodores. BJR got their first start in AUSCAR in the 3rd annual Goodyear AUSCAR 200 at the Calder Park Thunderdome in 1988 in a Holden VL Commodore dubbed the "Green Meanie". Brad Jones qualified 5th and a strong run inside the top 10 saw him established as one of the front-runners.

Initially BJR raced only in AUSCAR, the second-tier series behind NASCAR where they quickly grew to become the dominant team in the series, winning five consecutive titles from 1990 to 1994. Occasional forays into Australia's NASCAR series blossomed into a full NASCAR campaign in the 1994/95 season and the team were rewarded with a sixth consecutive title with Jones this time driving a Chevrolet Lumina.

== Super Touring ==
After running a Super Production Car Lotus Esprit to another title victory in 1994, BJR moved away from the fading Superspeedway scene into circuit racing and in 1995 entered the Australian Super Touring series as the official Audi team in the series, fielding a pair of Audi A4 Quattros for himself and Greg Murphy. The team then spent the next five years swapping titles with Paul Morris Motorsport, the official BMW team, with Jones winning the championship in 1996 and 1998. Murphy and later Cameron McConville (who replaced Murphy in 1997) won many races during the six-year period when Super Touring was at its peak.

During this time Brad Jones Racing twice finished on the podium in the two Bathurst 1000 races held for Super Touring cars. Jones himself finished second in 1997 with Frank Biela, and third in 1998 with McConville.

In 2000 while still heading Audi's Super Touring team in Australia, Jones was drafted into the Audi Sport North America sports car team for the Race of a Thousand Years, an American Le Mans Series race held on 31 December 2000 at the Adelaide Street Circuit. Jones was brought in as a third driver in the Allan McNish / Rinaldo Capello driven Audi R8 after Scotsman McNish had hurt his back 2 days before the race while stepping out of his Kilt after some publicity photos. Jones qualified the car (Capello won the pole), but McNish recovered to race and Jones remained a spectator for the 225 lap event which was won by McNish and Capello.

== Supercars Championship ==
=== Debut in Supercars ===
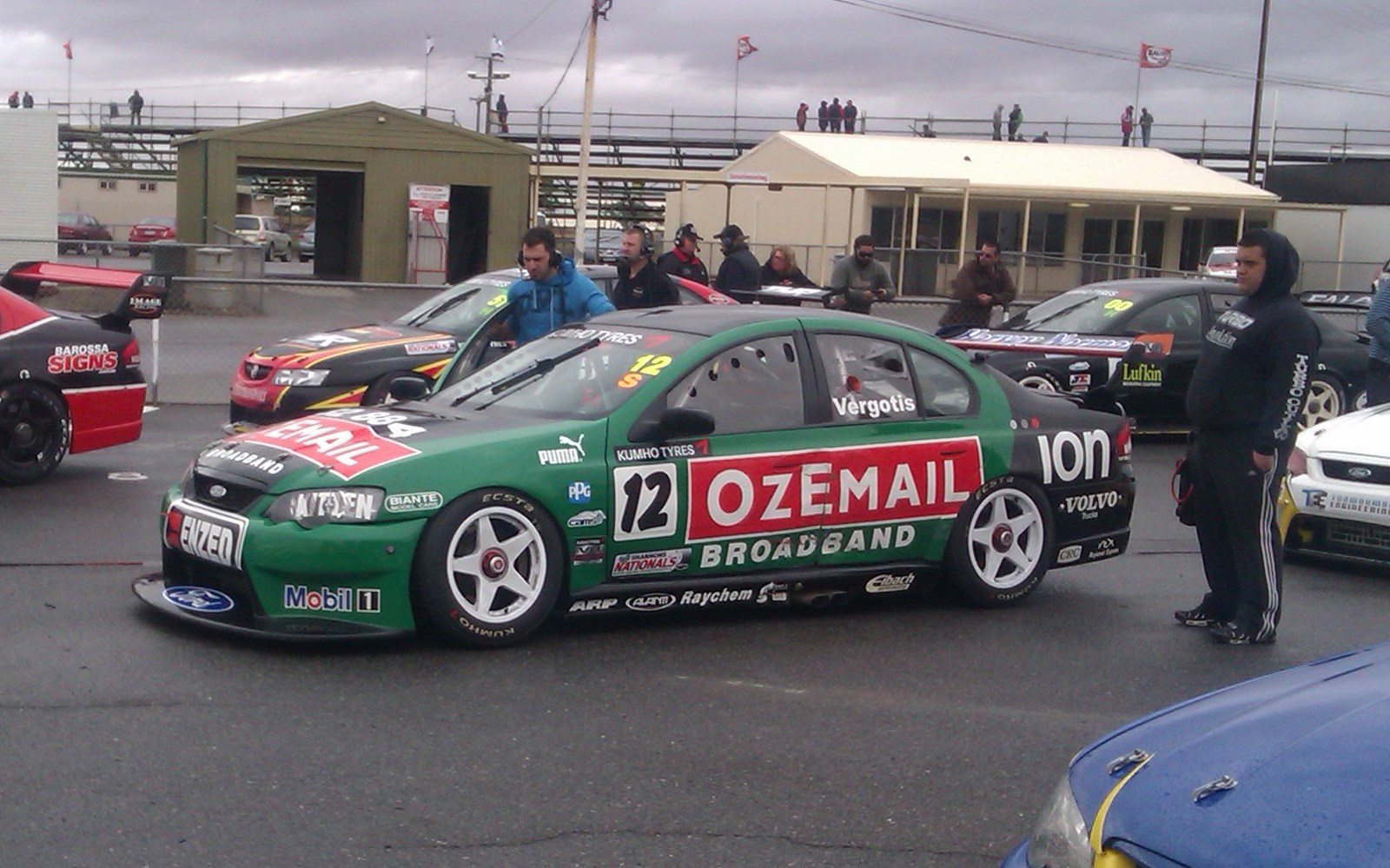
A restored Ford BA Falcon which John Bowe raced in 2004.

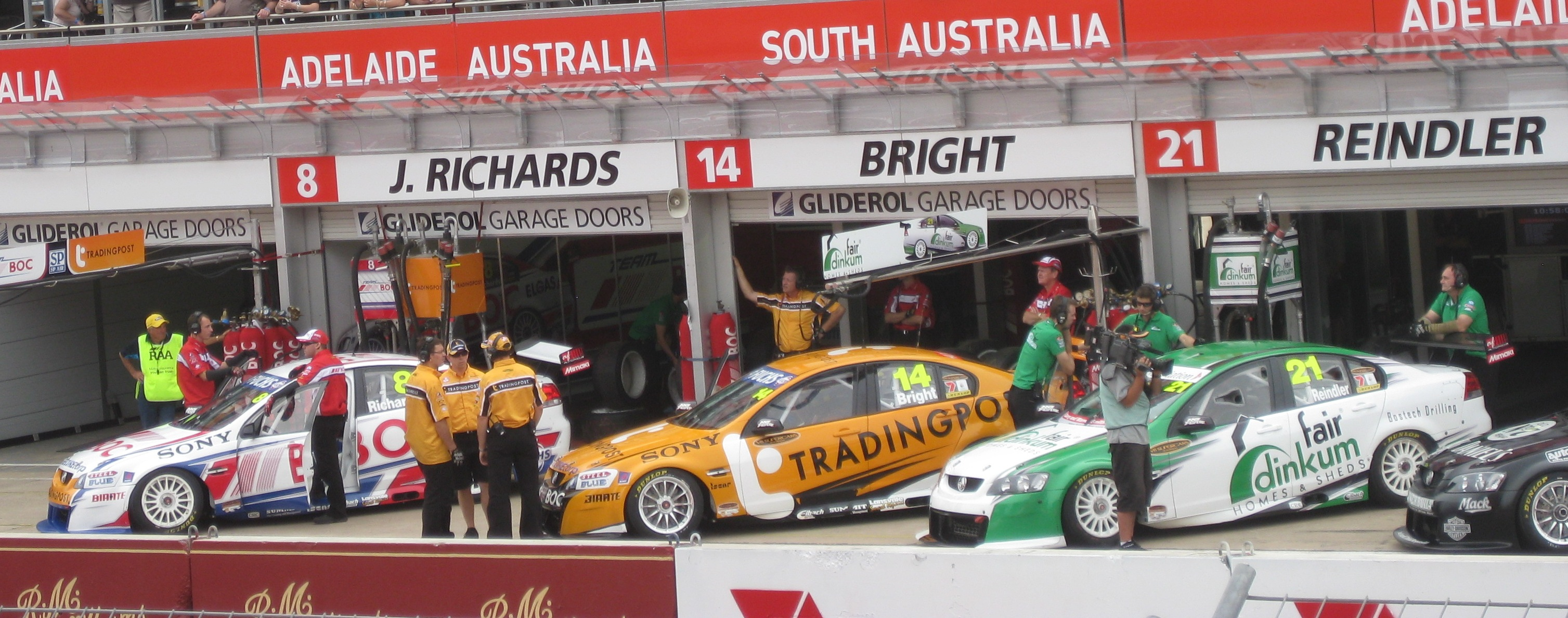
The team's three Holden VE Commodores at the 2010 Clipsal 500.

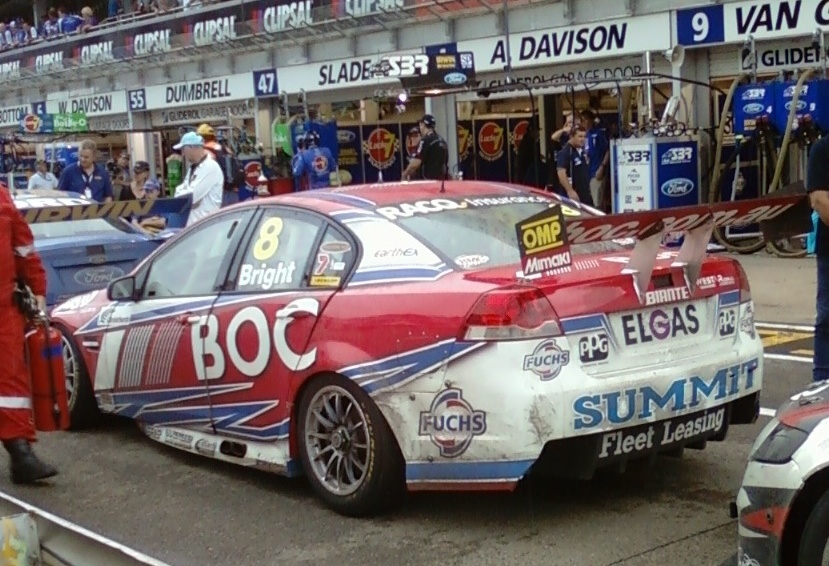
The Holden VE Commodore of Jason Bright at the 2011 Clipsal 500.

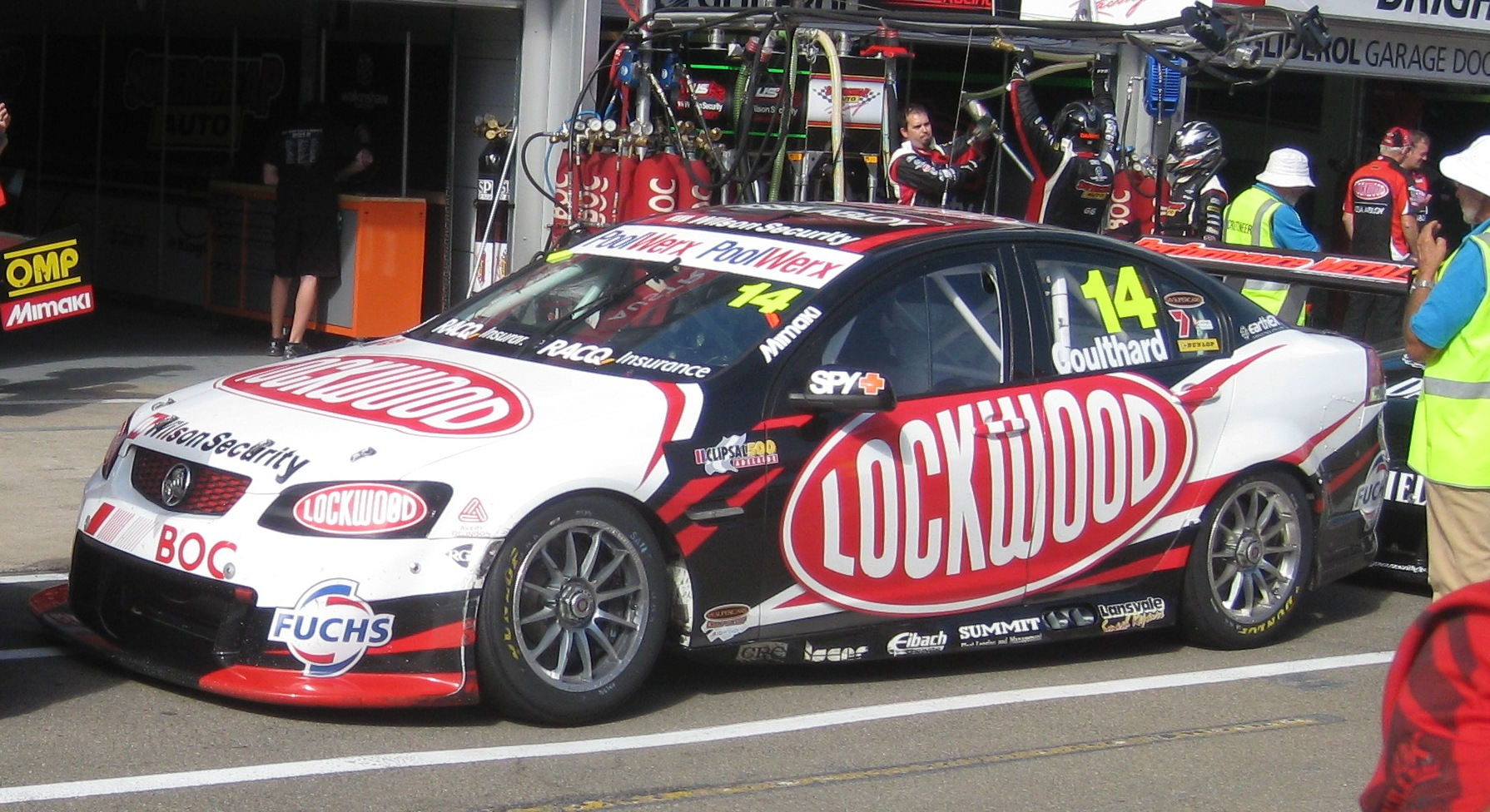
The Holden VE Commodore of Fabian Coulthard at the 2012 Clipsal 500.

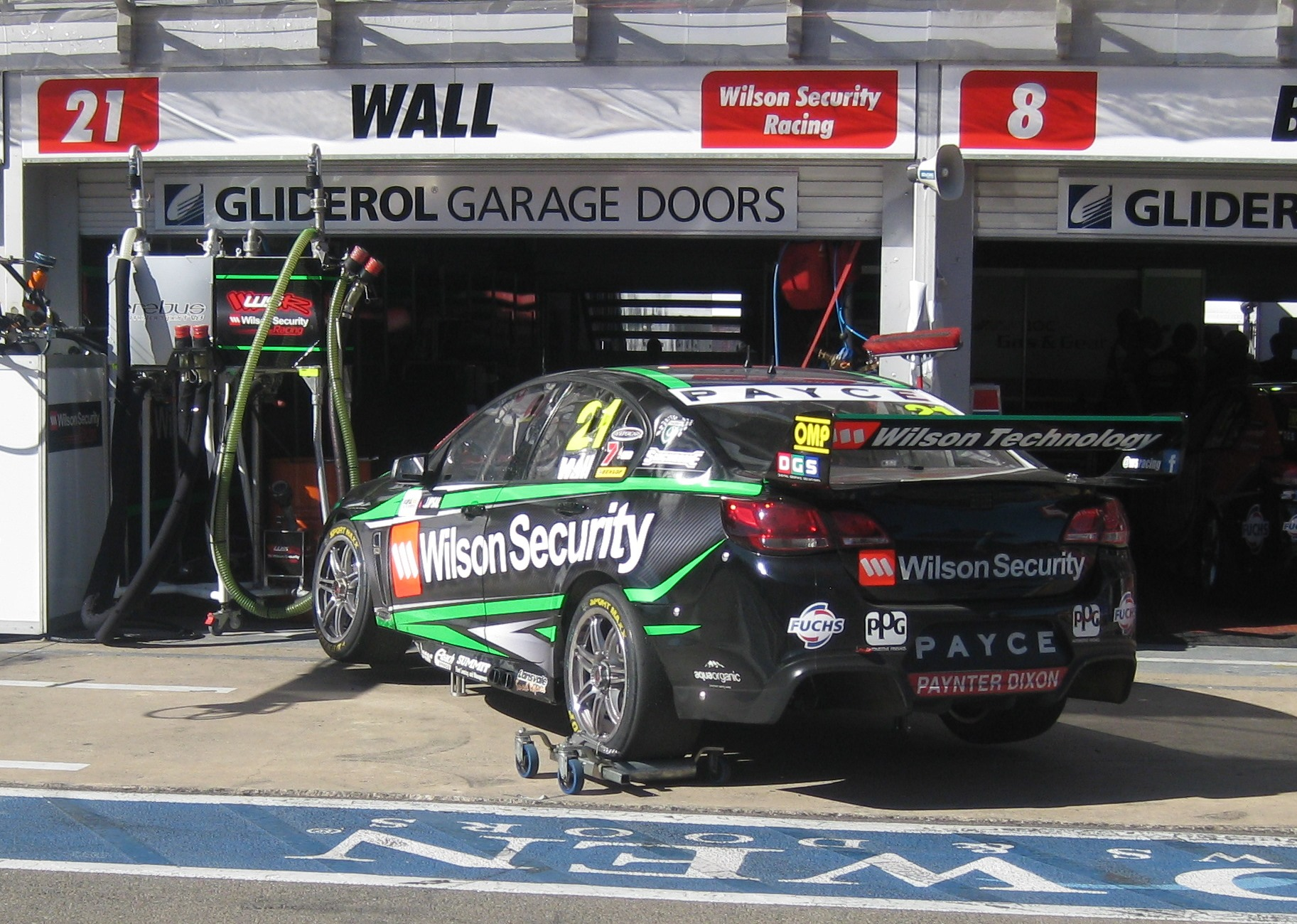
The Britek Motorsport Holden VF Commodore of David Wall at the 2013 Clipsal 500.

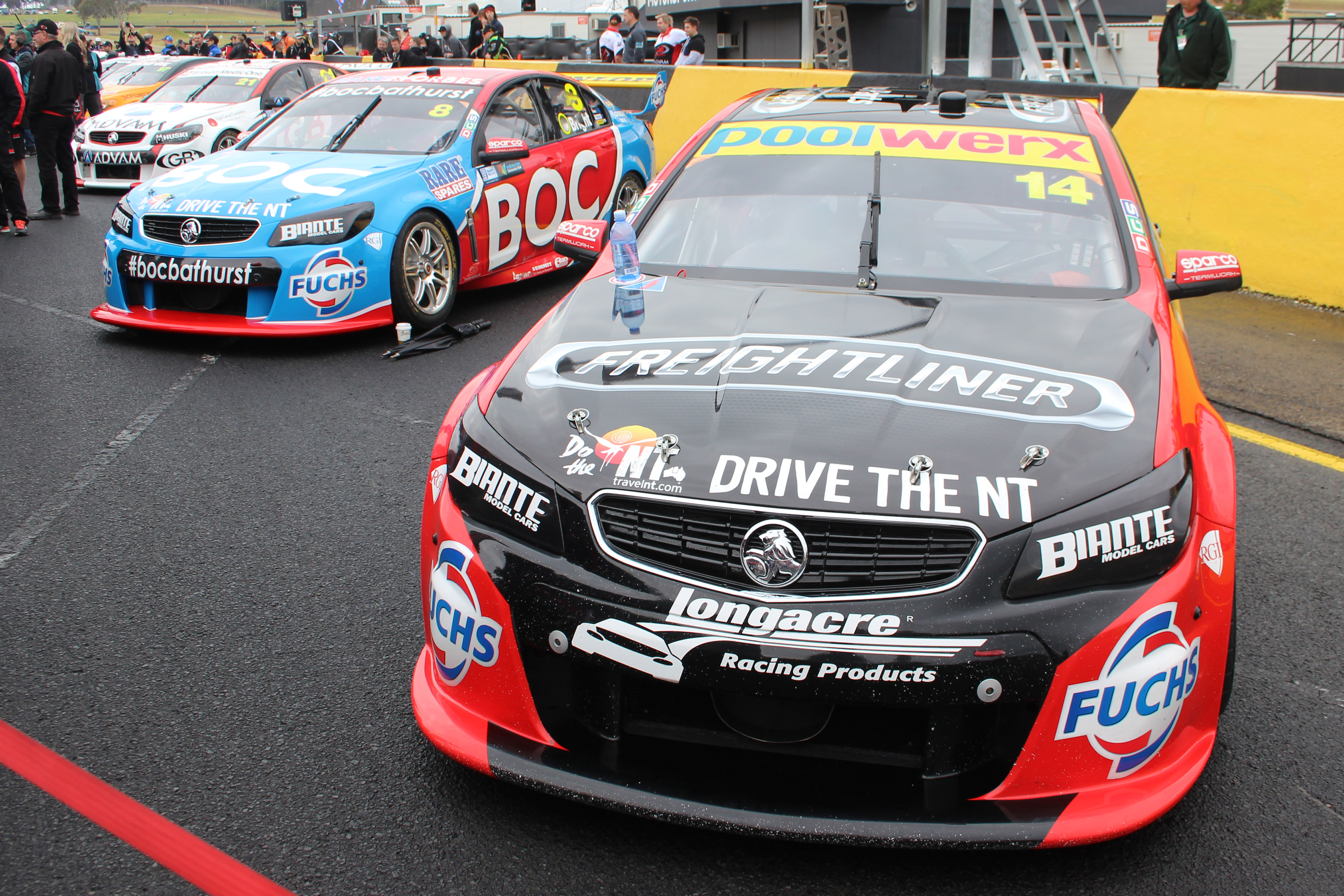
The Holden VF Commodores of Fabian Coulthard, Jason Bright and Dale Wood at the 2015 Sydney Motorsport Park Super Sprint.

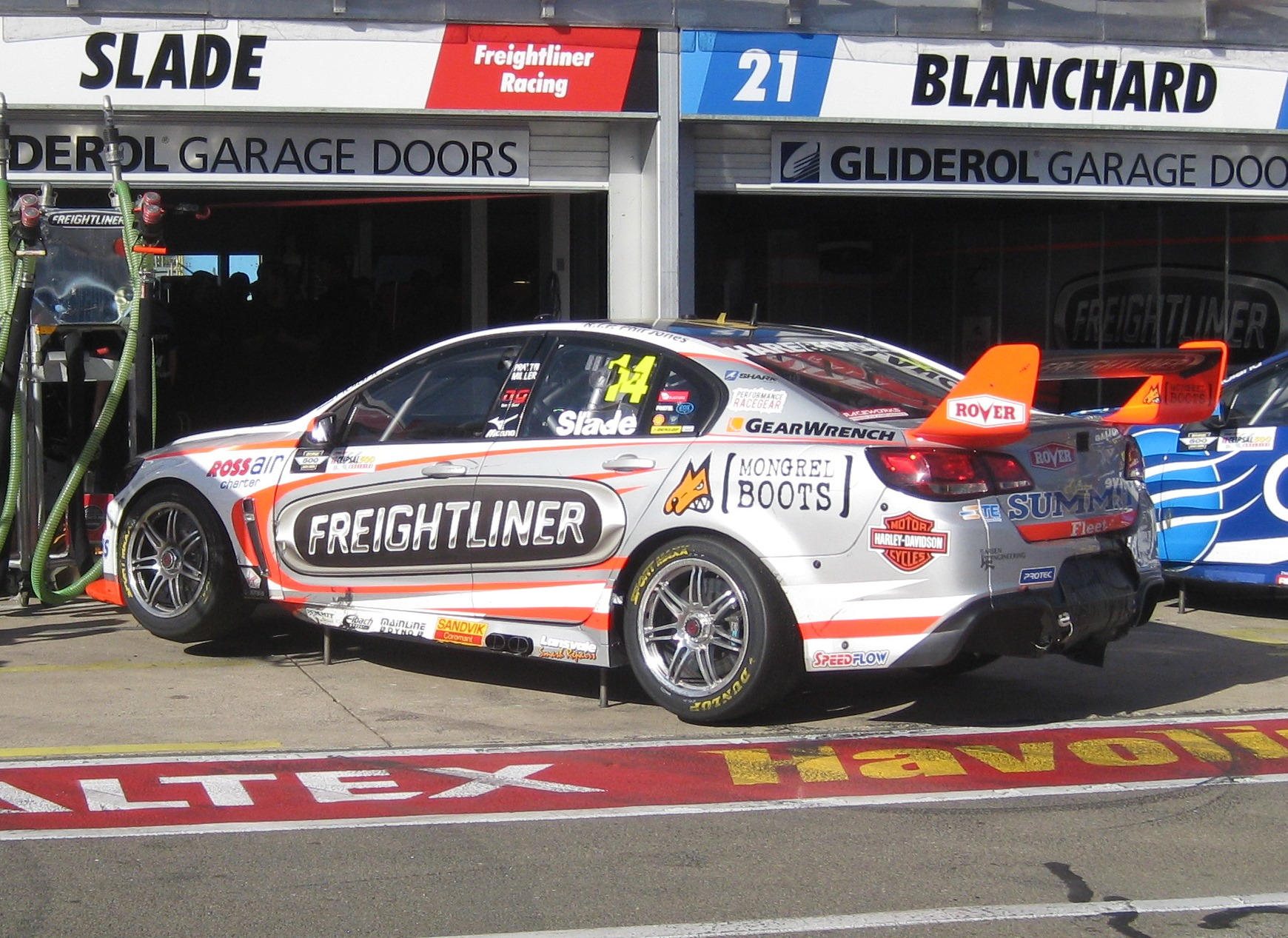
The Freightline Racing Holden VF Commodore of Tim Slade at the 2017 Clipsal 500 Adelaide

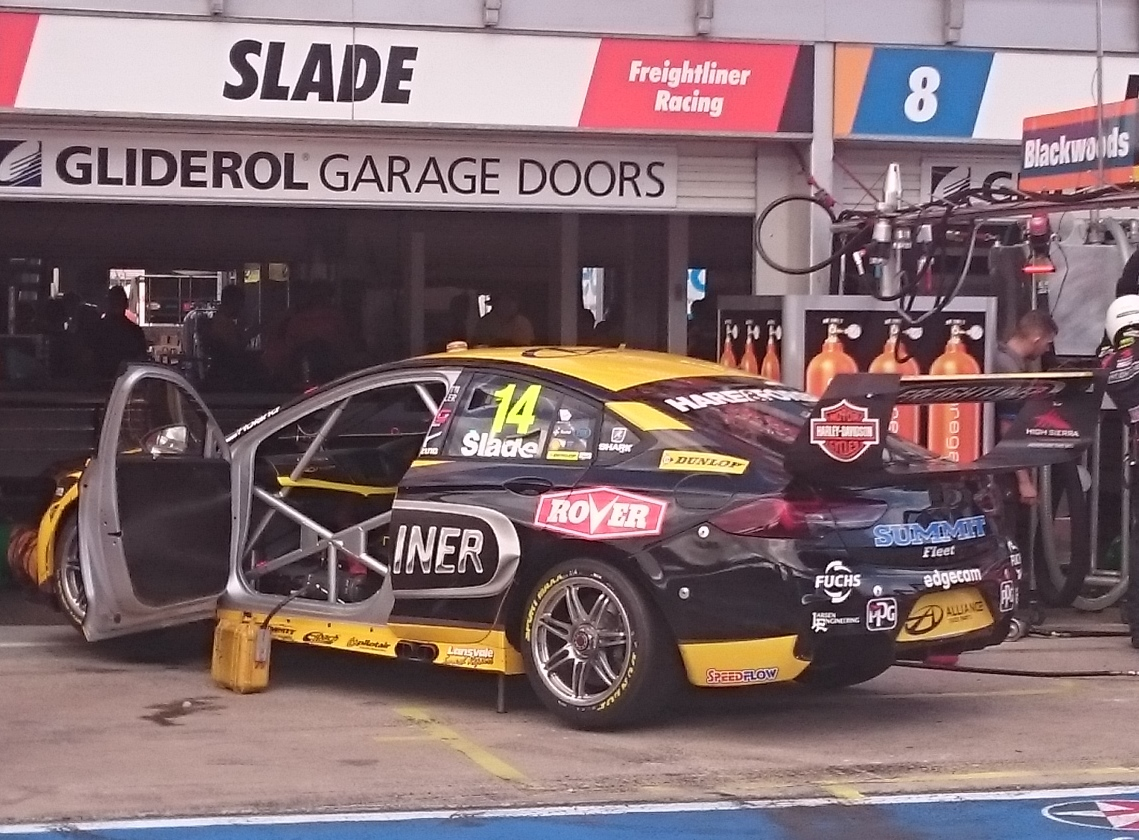
The Freightline Racing Holden ZB Commodore of Tim Slade at the 2018 Adelaide 500

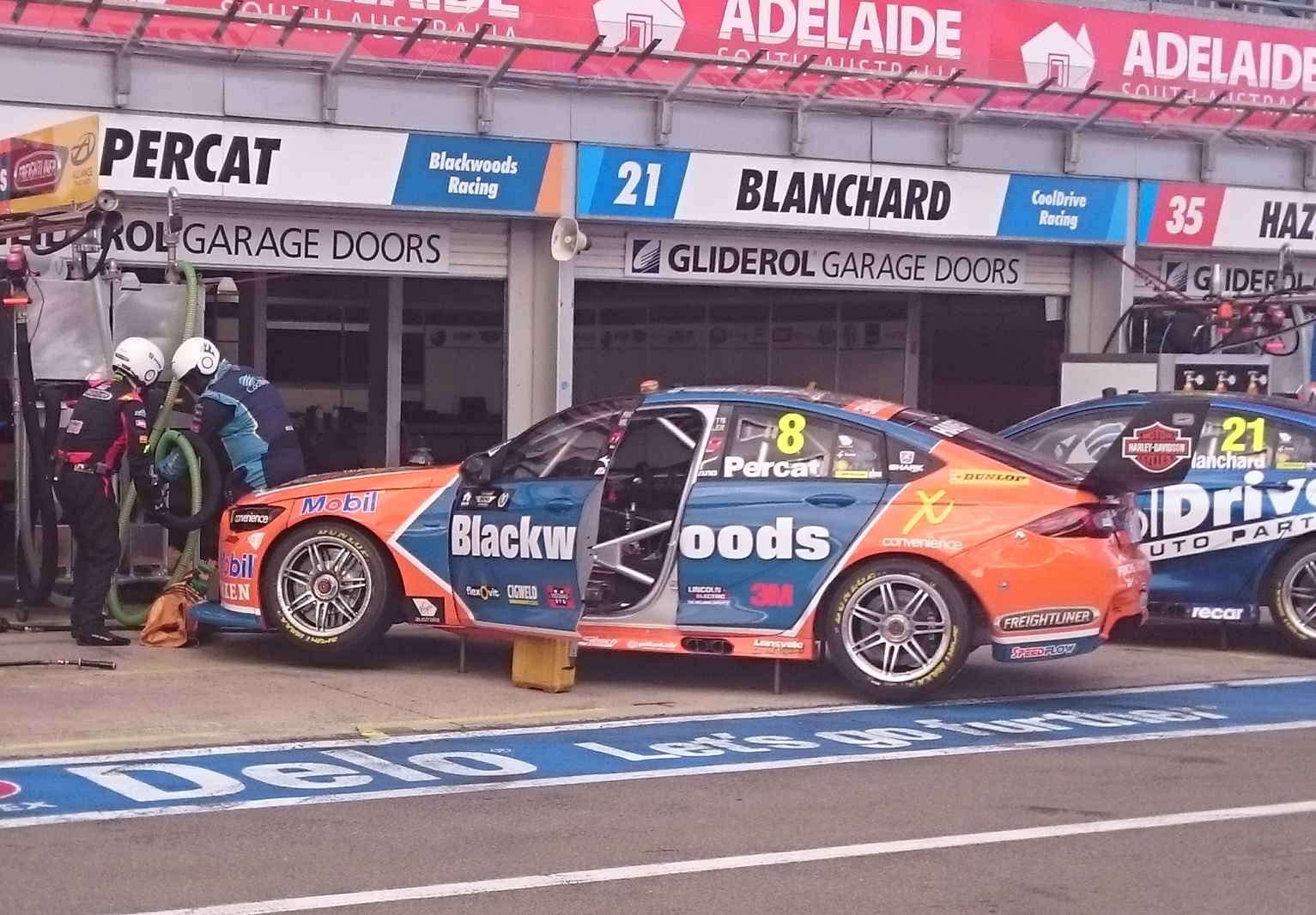
The Blackwoods Racing Holden ZB Commodore of Nick Percat at the 2018 Adelaide 500

The team entered the V8 series in 2000 after purchasing a Ford AU Falcon and Racing Entitlement Contract from Longhurst Racing. Running as a one car team in 2000 and 2001, the team achieved modest results, highlighted by second place at the 2001 Bathurst 1000 where Jones partnered John Cleland.

In 2002 BJR expanded to two cars, with former ATCC champion John Bowe joining the team. Performance at Bathurst continued to be strong, Bowe qualifying 2nd in 2002 and 2003, and the Bowe-Jones combination finishing 3rd in 2004.

In 2005, BJR won their first race at the Australian Grand Prix (Non-Championship) courtesy of Bowe in race 2, but success in the following championship rounds eluded them. A low for the year came at the Bathurst 1000 when Jones was caught up in a lap 1 accident with Garth Tander and Greg Ritter.

In 2006 used Stone Brothers Racing engines. The season was marred with bad luck, with the new spec SBR engines power not suiting the BJR engineered chassis and one of the co-drivers for the Sandown 500 and Bathurst 1000, Mark Porter, died while racing in the development series.

In 2007, Brad's nephew and Kim's son Andrew Jones replaced John Bowe. Once again, the team struggled on in the early stage of this season and Brad Jones announced his retirement mid-season. Team BOC drafted 2001 Development Series champion Simon Wills to drive the now vacated No. 14 BF Falcon at round 4 at Winton. The season had another bad season, with less than pleasing results and at the biggest race of the year, Bathurst, both cars failed to finish with car No. 14 crashing heavily in qualifying and car No. 12 having an engine fire.

=== Move To Holden ===
In 2008 Brad Jones Racing decided it was time for a change after finishing the 2007 teams championship in last position, behind numerous single car operations. They made the decision to change their manufacturer from their long standing association Ford to the rival Holden. They bought two Holden VE Commodores previously campaigned by the Holden Racing Team.

Cameron McConville returned to the team in 2008. In 2009 Jason Richards joined the team replacing Andrew Jones.

In 2010, Jason Bright replaced the retiring McConville. Bright brought his Britek Motorsport REC which was used to enter a third car for Karl Reindler. The team's endurance drivers were Andrew Jones in No. 8, Matt Halliday in No. 14 and David Wall in No. 21. For the Phillip Island round, Bright debuted a brand new Chassis, also constructed by the BJR team. Fabrizio Giovanardi and Alain Menu were the international enduro drivers for October's Gold Coast 600, with Giovandari with Reindler in No. 21 and Menu with Bright in No. 14. After the Symmons Plains event in Tasmania, Jason Richards was diagnosed with stomach cancer and couldn't compete in the final two events of 2010. Enduro driver Andrew Jones replaced him for final two events of 2010.

For the 2011 season, Jason Bargwanna joined the team. Jason Bright won the team's first V8 Supercar race, winning Race 8 in Perth, this was then backed up by another win at Winton. The Endurance drivers were Andrew Jones in No. 8, Shane Price in No. 14, and David Wall in No. 21. Fabrizio Giovanardi, Allan Simonsen and Stéphane Sarrazin were the international enduro drivers for October's Gold Coast 600, with Giovandari with Reindler in No. 21 and Simonsen with Bargwanna in No. 14 and Sarrazin with Bright in No. 8. The 2011 season ended on a sad note, with Jason Richards losing his battle with cancer.

For 2012, Fabian Coulthard replaced Bargwanna in the No.14 Entry with David Wall joining the team to drive the No.21 Car, Replacing Karl Reindler.

All three drivers remained with the team for 2013. Dale Wood joined the team in 2014 replacing David Wall.

For 2016, Fabian Coulthard left the team. He was replaced by Tim Slade in the team No. 14 Freightliner Entry. Tim Blanchard also replaced Dale Wood in the No. 21 Customer Britek Motorsport entry for 2016.

For the 2017 Season, Jason Bright would leave the team after 7 Years. He will be replaced by Nick Percat in the Teams No. 8 Entry. BOC would also step down as naming rights sponsor of the No. 8 Entry after 12 Years with the team.

== Results ==
=== Bathurst 1000 results ===
Year	No.	Car	Drivers	Pos.	Laps
2000	21	Ford Falcon AU	(Australia) Brad Jones (Australia) Tomas Mezera	DNF	20
2001	21	Ford Falcon AU	(Australia) Brad Jones (United Kingdom) John Cleland	2nd	161
2002	20	Ford Falcon AU	(Australia) Andrew Jones (Australia) Matthew Coleman	DNF	14
2002	21	Ford Falcon AU	(Australia) Brad Jones (Australia) John Bowe	16th	158
2002	888	Ford Falcon AU	(United Kingdom) John Cleland (Australia) Tim Leahey	19th	157
2003	21	Ford Falcon BA	(Australia) Brad Jones (Australia) John Bowe	10th	159
2003	888	Ford Falcon BA	(United Kingdom) John Cleland (Australia) Andrew Jones	9th	160
2004	12	Ford Falcon BA	(Australia) Brad Jones (Australia) John Bowe	3rd	161
2004	21	Ford Falcon BA	(Australia) Andrew Jones (United Kingdom) John Cleland	DNF	29
2005	12	Ford Falcon BA	(United Kingdom) John Cleland (Australia) Dale Brede	7th	159
2005	21	Ford Falcon BA	(Australia) John Bowe (Australia) Brad Jones	21st	125
2006	12	Ford Falcon BA	(Australia) Dale Brede (Australia) Michael Caruso (New Zealand) Mark Porter ^{1}	DNF	59
2006	14	Ford Falcon BA	(Australia) Brad Jones (Australia) John Bowe	11th	161
2007	12	Ford Falcon BF	(Australia) Andrew Jones (New Zealand) Simon Wills	DNF	52
2007	14	Ford Falcon BF	(Australia) Damien White (Singapore) Christian Murchison	DNS	0
2008	12	Holden Commodore VE	(Australia) Cameron McConville (Australia) Andrew Jones	DNF	40
2008	14	Holden Commodore VE	(Brazil) Max Wilson (Australia) Brad Jones	5th	161
2009	8	Holden Commodore VE	(Australia) Cameron McConville (New Zealand) Jason Richards	2nd	161
2009	14	Holden Commodore VE	(Australia) Andrew Jones (Australia) Brad Jones	23rd	145
2010	8	Holden Commodore VE	(New Zealand) Jason Richards (Australia) Andrew Jones	23rd	157
2010	14	Holden Commodore VE	(Australia) Jason Bright (New Zealand) Matthew Halliday	4th	161
2011	8	Holden Commodore VE	(Australia) Jason Bright (Australia) Andrew Jones	5th	161
2011	14	Holden Commodore VE	(Australia) Jason Bargwanna (Australia) Shane Price	23rd	158
2012	8	Holden Commodore VE	(Australia) Jason Bright (Australia) Andrew Jones	21st	153
2012	14	Holden Commodore VE	(New Zealand) Fabian Coulthard (Australia) David Besnard	23rd	147
2013	8	Holden Commodore VF	(Australia) Jason Bright (Australia) Andrew Jones	5th	161
2013	14	Holden Commodore VF	(New Zealand) Fabian Coulthard (Australia) Luke Youlden	16th	161
2014	8	Holden Commodore VF	(Australia) Jason Bright (Australia) Andrew Jones	14th	158
2014	14	Holden Commodore VF	(New Zealand) Fabian Coulthard (Australia) Luke Youlden	9th	161
2015	8	Holden Commodore VF	(Australia) Jason Bright (Australia) Andrew Jones	7th	161
2015	14	Holden Commodore VF	(New Zealand) Fabian Coulthard (Australia) Luke Youlden	4th	161
2016	8	Holden Commodore VF	(Australia) Jason Bright (Australia) Andrew Jones	DNF	89
2016	14	Holden Commodore VF	(Australia) Tim Slade (Australia) Ashley Walsh	7th	161
2017	8	Holden Commodore VF	(Australia) Nick Percat (Australia) Macauley Jones	DNF	160
2017	14	Holden Commodore VF	(Australia) Tim Slade (New Zealand) Andre Heimgartner (Australia) Ashley Walsh ^{2}	9th	161
2018	8	Holden Commodore ZB	(Australia) Nick Percat (Australia) Macauley Jones	7th	161
2018	14	Holden Commodore ZB	(Australia) Tim Slade (Australia) Ashley Walsh	17th	160
2019	8	Holden Commodore ZB	(Australia) Nick Percat (Australia) Tim Blanchard	14th	160
2019	14	Holden Commodore ZB	(Australia) Tim Slade (Australia) Ashley Walsh	Ret	0
2020	4	Holden Commodore ZB	(Australia) Jack Smith (Australia) Jack Perkins	Ret	149
2020	8	Holden Commodore ZB	(Australia) Nick Percat (Australia) Thomas Randle	18th	133
2020	14	Holden Commodore ZB	(Australia) Todd Hazelwood (Australia) Jordan Boys	Ret	50
2021	4	Holden Commodore ZB	(Australia) Jack Smith (Australia) David Wall	17th	161
2021	8	Holden Commodore ZB	(Australia) Nick Percat (Australia) Dale Wood	6th	161
2021	14	Holden Commodore ZB	(Australia) Todd Hazelwood (Australia) Dean Fiore	8th	161
2021	96	Holden Commodore ZB	(Australia) Macauley Jones (New Zealand) Chris Pither	12th	161
2022	4	Holden Commodore ZB	(Australia) Jack Smith (New Zealand) Jaxon Evans	DNF	138
2022	8	Holden Commodore ZB	(New Zealand) Andre Heimgartner (Australia) Dale Wood	DNF	4
2022	14	Holden Commodore ZB	(Australia) Bryce Fullwood (Australia) Dean Fiore	9th	161
2022	96	Holden Commodore ZB	(Australia) Macauley Jones (Australia) Jordan Boys	13th	161
2023	4	Chevrolet Camaro ZL1-1LE	(Australia) Jack Smith (New Zealand) Jaxon Evans	21st	157
2023	8	Chevrolet Camaro ZL1-1LE	(New Zealand) Andre Heimgartner (Australia) Dale Wood	DNF	68
2023	14	Chevrolet Camaro ZL1-1LE	(Australia) Bryce Fullwood (Australia) Dean Fiore	7th	161
2023	96	Chevrolet Camaro ZL1-1LE	(Australia) Macauley Jones (Australia) Jordan Boys	22nd	149
2024	8	Chevrolet Camaro ZL1-1LE	(New Zealand) Andre Heimgartner (Australia) Declan Fraser	16th	161
2024	14	Chevrolet Camaro ZL1-1LE	(Australia) Bryce Fullwood (Australia) Jaylyn Robotham	22nd	160
2024	50	Chevrolet Camaro ZL1-1LE	(New Zealand) Jaxon Evans (Australia) Dean Fiore	20th	161
2024	96	Chevrolet Camaro ZL1-1LE	(Australia) Macauley Jones (Australia) Jordan Boys	13th	161
2025	8	Chevrolet Camaro ZL1-1LE	(New Zealand) Andre Heimgartner (Australia) Declan Fraser	7th	161
2025	12	Chevrolet Camaro ZL1-1LE	(New Zealand) Jaxon Evans (Australia) Jack Smith	DNF	129
2025	14	Chevrolet Camaro ZL1-1LE	(Australia) Bryce Fullwood (Australia) Brad Vaughan	21st	140
2025	96	Chevrolet Camaro ZL1-1LE	(Australia) Macauley Jones (Australia) Jordan Boys	16th	159
2026	8	Toyota GR Supra	(New Zealand) Andre Heimgartner; TBA		
2026	14	Toyota GR Supra	(Australia) Cameron Hill; TBA		
2026	96	Toyota GR Supra	(Australia) Macauley Jones; TBA		

^1 — Mark Porter practiced in the #12 Falcon but was badly injured after a serious crash in a Fujitsu V8 Supercar Series race on the Friday before the race. Michael Caruso was drafted into the team to replace him. Porter would die on the Sunday afternoon from the injuries in the crash.
^2 — Ashley Walsh practiced in the #14 Commodore but was replaced by Andre Heimgartner due to his injuries.

=== Car No. 4 results ===
Year	Driver	No.	Make	1	2	3	4	5	6	7	8	9	10	11	12	13	14	15	16	17	18	19	20	21	22	23	24	25	26	27	28	29	30	31	32	33	34	35	36	37	38	39	40	Position	Pts
2019	Jack Smith	4	Holden	ADE; R1	ADE; R2	MEL; R3	MEL; R4	MEL; R5	MEL; R6	SYM; R7; 23	SYM; R8; 24	PHI; R9	PHI; R10	BAR; R11	BAR; R12	WIN; R13; 24	WIN; R14; 21	HID; R15; 20	HID; R16; 25	TOW; R17	TOW; R18	QLD; R19	QLD; R20	BEN; R21; 22	BEN; R22; 26	PUK; R23	PUK; R24	BAT; R25	SUR; R26	SUR; R27	SAN; QR	SAN; R28	NEW; R29	NEW; R30										36th	441
2020	Jack Smith	4	Holden	ADE; R1; 20	ADE; R2; 18	MEL; R3; C	MEL; R4; C	MEL; R5; C	MEL; R6; C	SMP1; R7; 23	SMP1; R8; 23	SMP1; R9; 18	SMP2; R10; 23	SMP2; R11; 10	SMP2; R12; 21	HID1; R13; 12	HID1; R14; 24	HID1; R15; 15	HID2; R16; 20	HID2; R17; 19	HID2; R18; 23	TOW1; R19; 16	TOW1; R20; 23	TOW1; R21; 22	TOW2; R22; 22	TOW2; R23; 22	TOW2; R24; 21	BEN1; R25; 23	BEN1; R26; 21	BEN1; R27; 22	BEN2; R28; 21	BEN2; R29; 17	BEN2; R30; 22	BAT; R31; Ret										22nd	812
2021	Jack Smith	4	Holden	BAT; R1; 17	BAT; R2; 21	SAN; R3; 18	SAN; R4; 21	SAN; R5; 23	SYM; R6; 15	SYM; R7; Ret	SYM; R8; 23	BEN; R9; 23	BEN; R10; 21	BEN; R11; 19	HID; R12; Ret	HID; R13; 22	HID; R14; 22	TOW; R15; 17	TOW; R16; 17	TOW2; R17; 17	TOW2; R18; 19	TOW2; R19; 21	SYD1; R20; 20	SYD1; R21; 19	SYD1; R22; 19	SYD2; R23; 19	SYD2; R24; 24	SYD2; R25; 17	SYD3; R26; 18	SYD3; R27; 21	SYD3; R28; 21	SYD4; R29; 16	SYD4; R30; C	BAT; R31; 17										21st	1025
2022	Jack Smith	4	Holden	SMP; R1; 17	SMP; R2; 18	SYM; R3; 17	SYM; R4; 20	SYM; R5; 17	MEL; R6; 13	MEL; R7; 19	MEL; R8; 21	MEL; R9; Ret	BAR; R10; 23	BAR; R11; Ret	BAR; R12; 18	WIN; R13; 22	WIN; R14; 23	WIN; R15; 26	HID; R16; 24	HID; R17; 19	HID; R18; 17	TOW; R19; 24	TOW; R20; 20	BEN; R21; 26	BEN; R22; 21	BEN; R23; 19	SAN; R24; 20	SAN; R25; 22	SAN; R26; 15	PUK; R27; 14	PUK; R28; 17	PUK; R29; 20	BAT; R30; Ret	SUR; R31; 21	SUR; R32; 14	ADE; R33; 21	ADE; R34; 20							24th	1054

=== Car No. 8 results ===
Year	Driver	No.	Make	1	2	3	4	5	6	7	8	9	10	11	12	13	14	15	16	17	18	19	20	21	22	23	24	25	26	27	28	29	30	31	32	33	34	35	36	37	38	39	40	Position	Pts
2017	Nick Percat	8	Holden	ADE; R1; 7	ADE; R2; Ret	SYM; R3; Ret	SYM; R4; 11	PHI; R5; Ret	PHI; R6; 21	BAR; R7; 22	BAR; R8; 10	WIN; R9; 10	WIN; R10; 12	HID; R11; 3	HID; R12; 15	TOW; R13; 24	TOW; R14; 16	QLD; R15; 7	QLD; R16; 24	SMP; R17; 24	SMP; R18; 6	SAN; QR; 10	SAN; R19; 22	BAT; R20; Ret	SUR; R21; 21	SUR; R22; 10	PUK; R23; 16	PUK; R24; 14	NEW; R25; 8	NEW; R26; 6														19th	1527
2018	Nick Percat	8	Holden	ADE; R1; 11	ADE; R2; 15	MEL; R3; 9	MEL; R4; 7	MEL; R5; 3	MEL; R6; 2	SYM; R7; 12	SYM; R8; 9	PHI; R9; 26	PHI; R10; 13	BAR; R11; 9	BAR; R12; 7	WIN; R13; 18	WIN; R14; 14	HID; R15; 9	HID; R16; 6	TOW; R17; 10	TOW; R18; 13	QLD; R19; 10	QLD; R20; 25	SMP; R21; 8	BEN; R22; 11	BEN; R23; 5	SAN; QR; 25	SAN; R24; 24	BAT; R25; 7	SUR; R26; 6	SUR; R27; C	PUK; R28; 8	PUK; R29; 10	NEW; R30; Ret	NEW; R31; 12									10th	2290
2019	Nick Percat	8	Holden	ADE; R1; 7	ADE; R2; 5	MEL; R3; 14	MEL; R4; 15	MEL; R5; 8	MEL; R6; 10	SYM; R7; 8	SYM; R8; 7	PHI; R9; 9	PHI; R10; 10	BAR; R11; 7	BAR; R12; 10	WIN; R13; 7	WIN; R14; 9	HID; R15; 13	HID; R16; 15	TOW; R17; 8	TOW; R18; 19	QLD; R19; 8	QLD; R20; 9	BEN; R21; 8	BEN; R22; 4	PUK; R23; 12	PUK; R24; 4	BAT; R25; 14	SUR; R26; 14	SUR; R27; 10	SAN; QR; 18	SAN; R28; 11	NEW; R29; 14	NEW; R30; 9										9th	2445
2020	Nick Percat	8	Holden	ADE; R1; 22	ADE; R2; 7	MEL; R3; C	MEL; R4; C	MEL; R5; C	MEL; R6; C	SMP1; R7; 5	SMP1; R8; 1	SMP1; R9; 9	SMP2; R10; 9	SMP2; R11; 1	SMP2; R12; 11	HID1; R13; Ret	HID1; R14; 6	HID1; R15; 6	HID2; R16; 5	HID2; R17; 13	HID2; R18; 2	TOW1; R19; Ret	TOW1; R20; 5	TOW1; R21; 4	TOW2; R22; 6	TOW2; R23; 4	TOW2; R24; 7	BEN1; R25; 10	BEN1; R26; 9	BEN1; R27; 17	BEN2; R28; 6	BEN2; R29; 6	BEN2; R30; 4	BAT; R19; 18										7th	1743
2021	Nick Percat	8	Holden	BAT; R1; 18	BAT; R2; 10	SAN; R3; 7	SAN; R4; 6	SAN; R5; 9	SYM; R6; 24	SYM; R7; 11	SYM; R8; 10	BEN; R9; 5	BEN; R10; 17	BEN; R11; 6	HID; R12; 3	HID; R13; 9	HID; R14; 6	TOW; R15; 4	TOW; R16; 20	TOW2; R17; 13	TOW2; R18; 15	TOW2; R19; 10	SYD1; R20; 4	SYD1; R21; 3	SYD1; R22; 11	SYD2; R23; 4	SYD2; R24; 9	SYD2; R25; 4	SYD3; R26; 23	SYD3; R27; 7	SYD3; R28; 4	SYD4; R29; 10	SYD4; R30; C	BAT; R31; 6										7th	2008
2022	Andre Heimgartner	8	Holden	SMP; R1; 14	SMP; R2; 5	SYM; R3; 8	SYM; R4; Ret	SYM; R5; 24	MEL; R6; 14	MEL; R7; Ret	MEL; R8; 18	MEL; R9; 17	BAR; R10; 10	BAR; R11; 3	BAR; R12; 9	WIN; R13; 9	WIN; R14; 7	WIN; R15; 3	HID; R16; 4	HID; R17; 9	HID; R18; 5	TOW; R19; 4	TOW; R20; 9	BEN; R21; 10	BEN; R22; Ret	BEN; R23; DNS	SAN; R24; 23	SAN; R25; 6	SAN; R26; 13	PUK; R27; 2	PUK; R28; 6	PUK; R29; 3	BAT; R30; Ret	SUR; R31; Ret	SUR; R32; 8	ADE; R33; 9	ADE; R34; 5							10th	1877

=== Car No. 14 results ===
Year	Driver	No.	Make	1	2	3	4	5	6	7	8	9	10	11	12	13	14	15	16	17	18	19	20	21	22	23	24	25	26	27	28	29	30	31	32	33	34	35	36	37	38	39	40	Position	Pts
2012	Fabian Coulthard	14	Holden	ADE; R1; 6	ADE; R2; 9	SYM; R3; 16	SYM; R4; 11	HAM; R5; 9	HAM; R6; 5	BAR; R7; 15	BAR; R8; 4	BAR; R9; 7	PHI; R10; 22	PHI; R11; 24	HID; R12; 24	HID; R13; 5	TOW; R14; 4	TOW; R15; Ret	QLD; R16; 4	QLD; R17; 5	SMP; R18; 12	SMP; R19; 6	SAN; QR; 18	SAN; R20; 15	BAT; R21; 23	SUR; R22; Ret	SUR; R23; 10	YMC; R24; 11	YMC; R25; 10	YMC; R26; 10	WIN; R27; 14	WIN; R28; 12	SYD; R29; Ret	SYD; R30; 15										11th	2035
2013	Fabian Coulthard	14	Holden	ADE; R1; 19	ADE; R2; Ret	SYM; R3; 1	SYM; R4; 3	SYM; R5; 1	PUK; R6; 5	PUK; R7; 10	PUK; R8; 3	PUK; R9; 4	BAR; R10; 27	BAR; R11; 4	BAR; R12; 7	COA; R13; 3	COA; R14; 3	COA; R15; 1	COA; R16; 2	HID; R17; 12	HID; R18; 7	HID; R19; 13	TOW; R20; 3	TOW; R21; 17	QLD; R22; 11	QLD; R23; 4	QLD; R24; 5	WIN; R25; 7	WIN; R26; 8	WIN; R27; 2	SAN; QR; 15	SAN; R28; 7	BAT; R29; 16	SUR; R30; Ret	SUR; R31; 2	PHI; R32; 2	PHI; R33; 5	PHI; R34; 5	SYD; R35; 19	SYD; R36; 15				6th	2501
2014	Fabian Coulthard	14	Holden	ADE; R1; 5	ADE; R2; 5	ADE; R3; 4	SYM; R4; 9	SYM; R5; 3	SYM; R6; 5	WIN; R7; 1	WIN; R8; 3	WIN; R9; 11	PUK; R10; 7	PUK; R11; 10	PUK; R12; 11	PUK; R13; 9	BAR; R14; 2	BAR; R15; 5	BAR; R16; 5	HID; R17; 9	HID; R18; 3	HID; R19; 22	TOW; R20; 15	TOW; R21; 3	TOW; R22; 14	QLD; R23; 4	QLD; R24; 9	QLD; R25; 11	SMP; R26; Ret	SMP; R27; 7	SMP; R28; 3	SAN; QR; 10	SAN; R29; 11	BAT; R30; 9	SUR; R31; 10	SUR; R32; 7	PHI; R33; 15	PHI; R34; 15	PHI; R35; 15	SYD; R36; 8	SYD; R37; 11	SYD; R38; 12		8th	2443
2015	Fabian Coulthard	14	Holden	ADE; R1; 3	ADE; R2; 1	ADE; R3; 6	SYM; R4; 10	SYM; R5; 10	SYM; R6; 9	BAR; R7; 8	BAR; R8; 3	BAR; R9; 3	WIN; R10; 6	WIN; R11; 21	WIN; R12; 2	HID; R13; Ret	HID; R14; 15	HID; R15; 3	TOW; R16; 3	TOW; R17; 13	QLD; R18; 10	QLD; R19; 15	QLD; R20; 14	SMP; R21; 11	SMP; R22; 2	SMP; R23; 2	SAN; QR; 9	SAN; R24; 16	BAT; R25; 4	SUR; R26; 7	SUR; R27; 13	PUK; R28; 23	PUK; R29; 9	PUK; R30; 7	PHI; R31; 12	PHI; R32; 11	PHI; R33; 11	SYD; R34; 10	SYD; R35; 14	SYD; R36; 10				7th	2542
2016	Tim Slade	14	Holden	ADE; R1; Ret	ADE; R2; 17	ADE; R3; 20	SYM; R4; 8	SYM; R5; 13	PHI; R6; 8	PHI; R7; 13	BAR; R8; 10	BAR; R9; 16	WIN; R10; 1	WIN; R11; 1	HID; R12; 13	HID; R13; 2	TOW; R14; 13	TOW; R15; 13	QLD; R16; 6	QLD; R17; 7	SMP; R18; 7	SMP; R19; 12	SAN; QR; 8	SAN; R20; 16	BAT; R21; 7	SUR; R22; 11	SUR; R23; 8	PUK; R24; 17	PUK; R25; 23	PUK; R26; 19	PUK; R27; 16	SYD; R28; 9	SYD; R29; 7											8th	2263
2017	Tim Slade	14	Holden	ADE; R1; 14	ADE; R2; 7	SYM; R3; Ret	SYM; R4; 8	PHI; R5; 18	PHI; R6; 19	BAR; R7; 13	BAR; R8; 17	WIN; R9; 27	WIN; R10; 11	HID; R11; 11	HID; R12; 5	TOW; R13; 20	TOW; R14; Ret	QLD; R15; 4	QLD; R16; 7	SMP; R17; 18	SMP; R18; 17	SAN; QR; 17	SAN; R19; DSQ	BAT; R20; 9	SUR; R21; 3	SUR; R22; 22	PUK; R23; 6	PUK; R24; 15	NEW; R25; 3	NEW; R26; 11														11th	1812
2018	Tim Slade	14	Holden	ADE; R1; 13	ADE; R2; 11	MEL; R3; 10	MEL; R4; 10	MEL; R5; 4	MEL; R6; 11	SYM; R7; 7	SYM; R8; 14	PHI; R9; 10	PHI; R10; 12	BAR; R11; 4	BAR; R12; 17	WIN; R13; 7	WIN; R14; 7	HID; R15; 14	HID; R16; 21	TOW; R17; 11	TOW; R18; 14	QLD; R19; 14	QLD; R20; 6	SMP; R21; 10	BEN; R22; 12	BEN; R23; 4	SAN; QR; 8	SAN; R24; 15	BAT; R25; 17	SUR; R26; 21	SUR; R27; C	PUK; R28; 17	PUK; R29; 11	NEW; R30; 18	NEW; R31; 15									11th	2249
2019	Tim Slade	14	Holden	ADE; R1; 17	ADE; R2; 4	MEL; R3; 6	MEL; R4; 8	MEL; R5; 3	MEL; R6; 7	SYM; R7; 7	SYM; R8; 12	PHI; R9; 17	PHI; R10; 9	BAR; R11; 11	BAR; R12; 11	WIN; R13; 13	WIN; R14; 12	HID; R15; Ret	HID; R16; 18	TOW; R17; 16	TOW; R18; 12	QLD; R19; Ret	QLD; R20; 17	BEN; R21; 14	BEN; R22; 12	PUK; R23; 11	PUK; R24; 18	BAT; R25; Ret	SUR; R26; 8	SUR; R27; 17	SAN; QR; 20	SAN; R28; 13	NEW; R29; 9	NEW; R30; 3										15th	1940
2020	Todd Hazelwood	14	Holden	ADE; R1; 13	ADE; R2; 14	MEL; R3; C	MEL; R4; C	MEL; R5; C	MEL; R6; C	SMP1; R7; 11	SMP1; R8; 18	SMP1; R9; 8	SMP2; R10; 13	SMP2; R11; 20	SMP2; R12; 3	HID1; R13; 18	HID1; R14; 20	HID1; R15; 20	HID2; R16; 16	HID2; R17; 15	HID2; R18; 15	TOW1; R19; Ret	TOW1; R20; 13	TOW1; R21; 5	TOW2; R22; 12	TOW2; R23; 14	TOW2; R24; 6	BEN1; R25; 24	BEN1; R26; 12	BEN1; R27; 10	BEN2; R28; 19	BEN2; R29; 11	BEN2; R30; 7	BAT; R31; Ret										17th	1181
2021	Todd Hazelwood	14	Holden	BAT; R1; 10	BAT; R2; 18	SAN; R3; 14	SAN; R4; 14	SAN; R5; 8	SYM; R6; 14	SYM; R7; 14	SYM; R8; 16	BEN; R9; 15	BEN; R10; 19	BEN; R11; 13	HID; R12; Ret	HID; R13; 14	HID; R14; 21	TOW; R15; 22	TOW; R16; 7	TOW2; R17; 9	TOW2; R18; 5	TOW2; R19; 4	SYD1; R20; 14	SYD1; R21; 10	SYD1; R22; 23	SYD2; R23; 5	SYD2; R24; 26	SYD2; R25; 9	SYD3; R26; 12	SYD3; R27; 13	SYD3; R28; 5	SYD4; R29; 14	SYD4; R30; C	BAT; R31; 8										13th	1599
2022	Bryce Fullwood	14	Holden	SMP; R1; 12	SMP; R2; 19	SYM; R3; 15	SYM; R4; 18	SYM; R5; 21	MEL; R6; 10	MEL; R7; 10	MEL; R8; 22	MEL; R9; 19	BAR; R10; Ret	BAR; R11; NC	BAR; R12; 14	WIN; R13; 20	WIN; R14; 21	WIN; R15; 23	HID; R16; 18	HID; R17; 15	HID; R18; 14	TOW; R19; 15	TOW; R20; 13	BEN; R21; 17	BEN; R22; 10	BEN; R23; 17	SAN; R24; 16	SAN; R25; 21	SAN; R26; 14	PUK; R27; 22	PUK; R28; 11	PUK; R29; 13	BAT; R30; 9	SUR; R31; 22	SUR; R32; 13	ADE; R33; 17	ADE; R34; Ret							17th	1383

=== Car No. 96 results ===
Year	Driver	No.	Make	1	2	3	4	5	6	7	8	9	10	11	12	13	14	15	16	17	18	19	20	21	22	23	24	25	26	27	28	29	30	31	32	33	34	35	36	37	38	39	40	Position	Pts
2021	Macauley Jones	96	Holden	BAT; R1; Ret	BAT; R2; 15	SAN; R3; 15	SAN; R4; Ret	SAN; R5; 18	SYM; R6; 19	SYM; R7; 20	SYM; R8; 20	BEN; R9; 22	BEN; R10; Ret	BEN; R11; 20	HID; R12; 17	HID; R13; 20	HID; R14; 20	TOW; R15; 16	TOW; R16; 14	TOW2; R17; Ret	TOW2; R18; Ret	TOW2; R19; Ret	SYD1; R20; 16	SYD1; R21; 16	SYD1; R22; 16	SYD2; R23; 13	SYD2; R24; 11	SYD2; R25; 20	SYD3; R26; 14	SYD3; R27; 18	SYD3; R28; 15	SYD4; R29; Ret	SYD4; R30; C	BAT; R31; 12										23rd	988
2022	Macauley Jones	96	Holden	SMP; R1; 22	SMP; R2; 21	SYM; R3; 19	SYM; R4; 13	SYM; R5; 19	MEL; R6; 6	MEL; R7; 11	MEL; R8; 23	MEL; R9; 18	BAR; R10; 15	BAR; R11; 19	BAR; R12; 16	WIN; R13; 15	WIN; R14; 19	WIN; R15; 19	HID; R16; 20	HID; R17; 17	HID; R18; 18	TOW; R19; 22	TOW; R20; 22	BEN; R21; 22	BEN; R22; 14	BEN; R23; 20	SAN; R24; 17	SAN; R25; 14	SAN; R26; 17	PUK; R27; Ret	PUK; R28; 13	PUK; R29; 17	BAT; R30; 13	SUR; R31; 20	SUR; R32; Ret	ADE; R33; 12	ADE; R34; 22							19th	1282

== Supercars Championship drivers ==
The following is a list of drivers who have driven for the team in the Supercars Championship, in order of their first appearance. Drivers who only drove for the team on a part-time basis are listed in italics.

- (Australia) Brad Jones (2000–09)
- (Australia) Tomas Mezera (2000)
- (United Kingdom) John Cleland (2001–05)
- (Australia) John Bowe (2002–06)
- (Australia) Tim Leahey (2002)
- (Australia) Andrew Jones (2003–04, 2007–16)
- (Australia) Dale Brede (2005–06)
- (Australia) Mark Porter (2006)
- (Australia) Michael Caruso (2006)
- (New Zealand) Simon Wills (2007)
- (Australia) Damien White (2007)
- (Singapore) Christian Murchison (2007)
- (Australia) Cameron McConville (2008–09, 2011)
- (Brazil) Max Wilson (2008)
- (New Zealand) Jason Richards (2009–10)
- (Australia) Jason Bright (2010–16)
- (New Zealand) Matt Halliday (2010)
- (Switzerland) Alain Menu (2010)
- (Australia) Jason Bargwanna (2011)
- (Australia) Shane Price (2011)
- (France) Stéphane Sarrazin (2011–12)
- (Denmark) Allan Simonsen (2011)
- (New Zealand) Fabian Coulthard (2012–15)
- (Australia) David Besnard (2012)
- (France) Nicolas Minassian (2012)
- (Australia) Luke Youlden (2013–15)
- (Australia) Tim Slade (2016–19)
- (Australia) Ashley Walsh (2016–19)
- (New Zealand) Andre Heimgartner (2017, 2022–present)
- (Australia) Nick Percat (2017–21)
- (Australia) Macauley Jones (2017–18, 2021–present)
- (Australia) Jack Smith (2019–2023, 2025)
- (Australia) Tim Blanchard (2019)
- (Australia) Todd Hazelwood (2020–21)
- (Australia) Thomas Randle (2020)
- (Australia) Jack Perkins (2020)
- (Australia) Jordan Boys (2020, 2022–present)
- (New Zealand) Chris Pither (2021)
- (Australia) Dale Wood (2021–2023)
- (Australia) Dean Fiore (2021–2024)
- (Australia) David Wall (2021)
- (Australia) Bryce Fullwood (2022–2025)
- (New Zealand) Jaxon Evans (2022–2025)
- (Australia) Declan Fraser (2024–2025)
- (Australia) Jaylyn Robotham (2024)
- (Australia) Brad Vaughan (2025)
- (Australia) Cameron Hill (2026-present)

== Super2 drivers ==
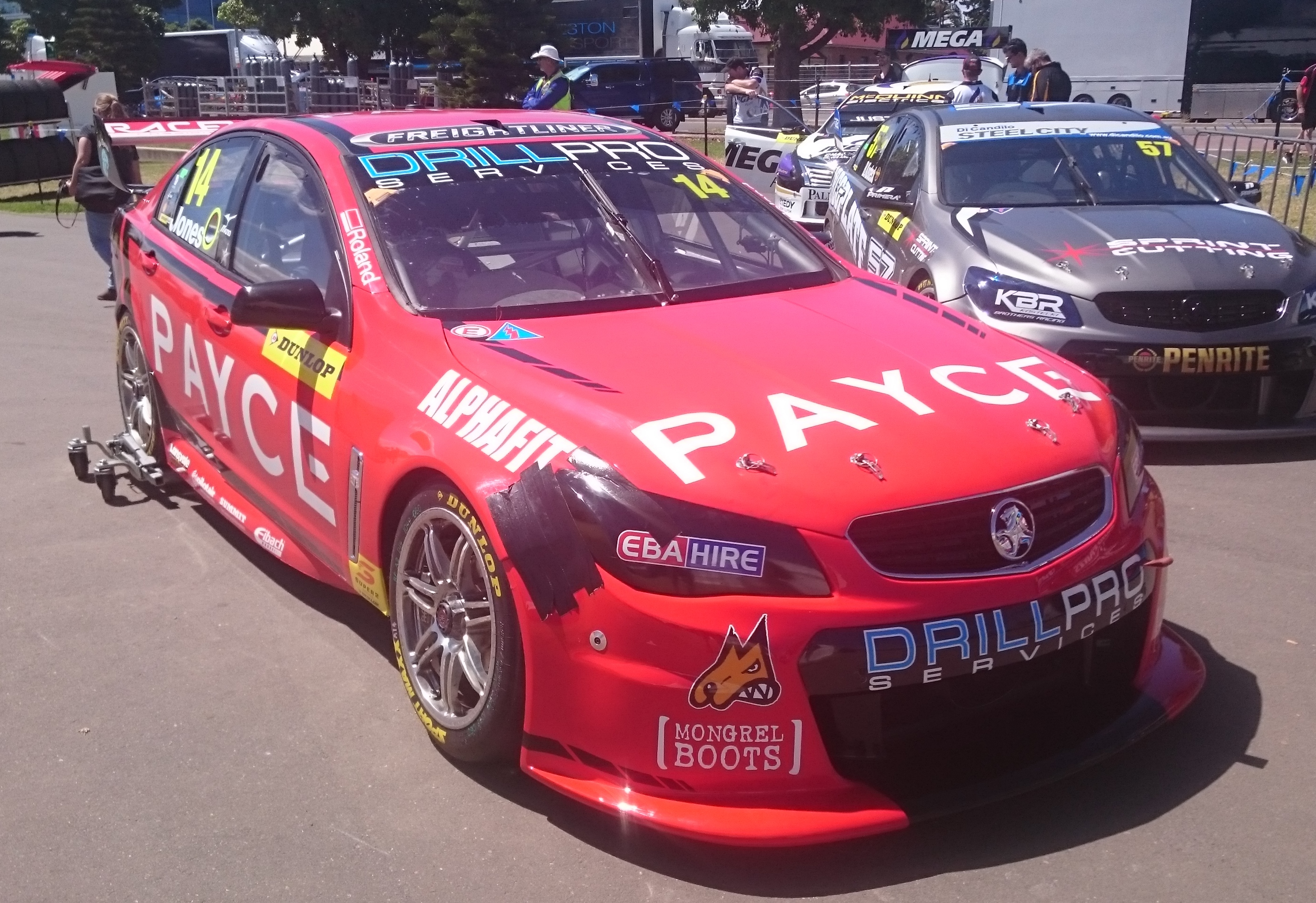
Macauley Jones placed ninth in the 2018 Dunlop Super2 Series driving a Holden Commodore VF for Brad Jones Racing

The following list of drivers have driven for the team in the Super2 Series. The drivers who drove for the team on a part-time basis are listed in italics

- (Australia) Andrew Jones (2002-2004, 2011-2017)
- (Australia) Dale Brede (2005)
- (Australia) Luke Youlden (2013)
- (New Zealand) Chris Pither (2013–2014)
- (Australia) Macauley Jones (2014–2018)
- (Australia) Josh Kean (2015–2016)
- (Australia) Jack Smith (2017–2019)
- (Australia) Zane Goddard (2018)
- (Australia) Tim Blanchard (2019)
- (Australia) Josh Fife (2020)
- (Australia) Elly Morrow (2022)
- (Australia) Lachlan Dalton (2022–2023)
- (Australia) Cody Gillis (2024–2025)
- (Australia) Elliott Cleary (2024)
- (Australia) Brad Vaughan (2025–present)
- (Australia) Matt Hillyer (2026–present)

== Super3 Drivers ==
- (Australia) Josh Smith (2016)
- (Australia) Jack Smith (2017–2018)
- (Australia) Harry Hayek (2018)
- (New Zealand) Madeline Stewart (2019)
- (Australia) Josh Fife (2019)
- (Australia) Elly Morrow (2021)
