= Brad Jones (racing driver) =

Australian racing driver (born 1960)

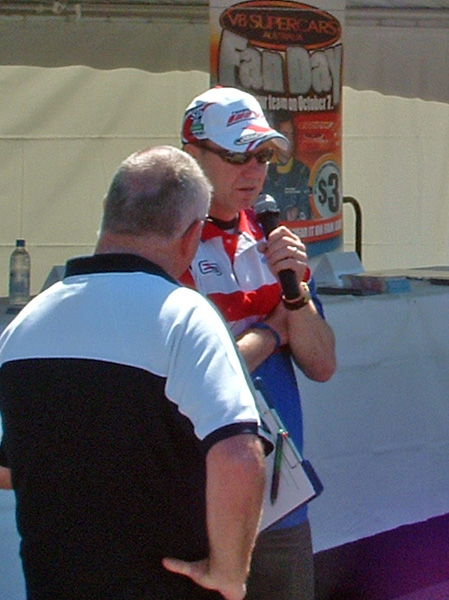
- Jones in 2005
- Nationality: Australian
- Born: 2 April 1960 (age 66) Albury, New South Wales
- Retired: 2009
- Relatives: Kim Jones (brother); Andrew Jones (nephew); Madison Jones (daughter); Macauley Jones (son); Montana Jones (daughter)

ATCC / V8 Supercar
- Years active: 1986, 1989, 1999–2009
- Teams: Mobil 1 Racing; Larkham Motor Sport; Brad Jones Racing
- Starts: 109
- Best finish: 10th in 1989 Australian Touring Car Championship

Previous series
- 1981 1985 1988–94 1994–95 1994 1995–99: Australian Formula Ford; Australian GT Champ. AUSCAR; Australian Super Production; NASCAR Australia; Australian Super Touring Champ.

Championship titles
- 1989–90 1990–91 1991–92 1992–93 1993–94 1994 1994–95 1996 1998: AUSCAR; AUSCAR; AUSCAR; AUSCAR; AUSCAR; Australian Super Production; NASCAR Australia; Australian Super Touring; Australian Super Touring

Bradley Jones (born 2 April 1960) is an Australian former racing driver. Jones now acts as team co-principal with his brother Kim in the V8 Supercar racing team, Brad Jones Racing.

Although he is more known as a V8 team owner, Brad Jones was successful in nearly all forms of motorsport he competed in. He is the only person to have won both the Australian AUSCAR and NASCAR championships.

== Motorsport career ==
Jones was born and grew up in the country town of Albury in New South Wales, where he still lives now. He has a range of experience in domestic and international racing that he puts to use in the V8 Supercar team he owns and runs with his brother Kim. Jones has driven with a number of manufacturers including Ford, Holden, Lotus, Volkswagen, Mercedes-Benz, Audi and Mitsubishi at domestic and international circuits in Japan, Macau and Belgium as well as Australia and New Zealand.

Jones started his racing career at the age of 14 doing motocross racing from which he eventually progressed up to Formula Ford in 1980. He then spent a number of years occasionally driving a twin-turbo Chevrolet V8 powered Mercedes-Benz 450 SLC for Shepparton based racer Bryan Thompson. While driving for Thompson, Jones finished seventh in the 1985 Australian GT Championship driving the Mercedes and a Chevrolet Monza previously driven by Bob Jane, Peter Brock and Allan Grice (Thompson would win the championship also driving both cars, while Grice had won the championship in the Monza in 1984). Jones also proved himself as one of the stars of Series Production racing driving a Mitsubishi Starion Turbo during the early to mid-1980s, having many battles with production car "king" Peter Fitzgerald in another Starion, and former Bathurst winners Brian Sampson in yet another Starion, and Colin Bond in an Alfa Romeo GTV6.

In 1985, the Mitsubishi Ralliart Team invited him to race in the two major Australian endurance races, the 1985 Castrol 500 at Sandown, and the 1985 James Hardie 1000 in a factory Group A Mitsubishi Starion. Jones' first start in the Bathurst 1000 lasted only just past the first turn on the first lap. A mid-field mishap saw Jones' Starion and the Holden VK Commodore of 1981 race winner John French collide and spin off into the tyre barrier with both cars too damaged to continue. This relationship with the Ralliart team lasted on and off until the end of 1988, with Jones racing extensively in Japan and often being overlooked for Australian races. During this time he qualified the Starion in the top 10 at Bathurst for the 1986 James Hardie 1000, and finish 10th outright in 1988.

For 1989, Jones moved into the "big time", landing the drive as Peter Brock's teammate in the Mobil 1 Racing team driving an ex-Andy Rouse BTCC Ford Sierra RS500 in the 1989 Australian Touring Car Championship, though his series was cut short after Barry Sheene had wrecked Jones' car while testing at Winton. He would later qualify his car in the top 10 at the 1989 Tooheys 1000 and partnering Paul Radisich would finish the race in ninth position. In the 1990 the cost of running the expensive European based Sierra's forced Brock to join forces with Andrew Miedecke (whose own Sierra, like Brock's, had links to British Sierra expert Rouse), leaving Jones without a drive. From 1990–1994 he was then called upon to drive for the Factory Holden Racing Team in the endurance races. While he was with the factory team he was quite successful and gained many podiums at both Sandown and Bathurst paired with Neil Crompton (1990–91), Tomas Mezera (1992), Wayne Gardner (1993) and Craig Lowndes (1994).

Jones' AUSCAR career started in 1988 in the third annual Goodyear AUSCAR 200 at the Calder Park Thunderdome, a track he would come to dominate, in a Holden VL Commodore dubbed the "Green Meanie" due to its colour. Jones quickly became a front runner in the series, eventually winning 5 consecutive championships in his self run team (with help from his brother Kim), Coopertools Racing (later with corporate Castrol sponsorship), all using Holden Commodore's. After dominating the AUSCAR's, Jones then turned his hands to the Australian NASCAR series and won the 94/95 championship driving a Chevrolet Lumina. Jones wasn't just dominant at the Thunderdome, he was also a regular winner on the ½ mile flat track Super Bowl at the Adelaide International Raceway (the only other paved oval in Australia), while his road racing background also saw him a winner on tracks like the Surfers Paradise Street Circuit and the short course at Oran Park.

In 1995, Jones switched from the Holden Racing Team to the Wayne Gardner owned Coca-Cola Team for whom he drove in both Sandown and Bathurst for 1995 and 1996 in a Holden VR Commodore. Once he lost the contract to drive with HRT he had to wait another year to get a contract to drive with Mark Larkham's Mitre 10 Ford Team. In the mid 1990s he also set up a highly successful Audi Super Touring team for the Australian Super Touring Championship, winning the championship in 1996 and 1998. He finished second with Frank Biela in an Audi A4 Quattro in the Super Touring 1997 AMP Bathurst 1000, while finishing third in 1998 with regular partner Cameron McConville.

Jones also won the 1994 Australian Super Production Car Series in a Lotus Esprit.

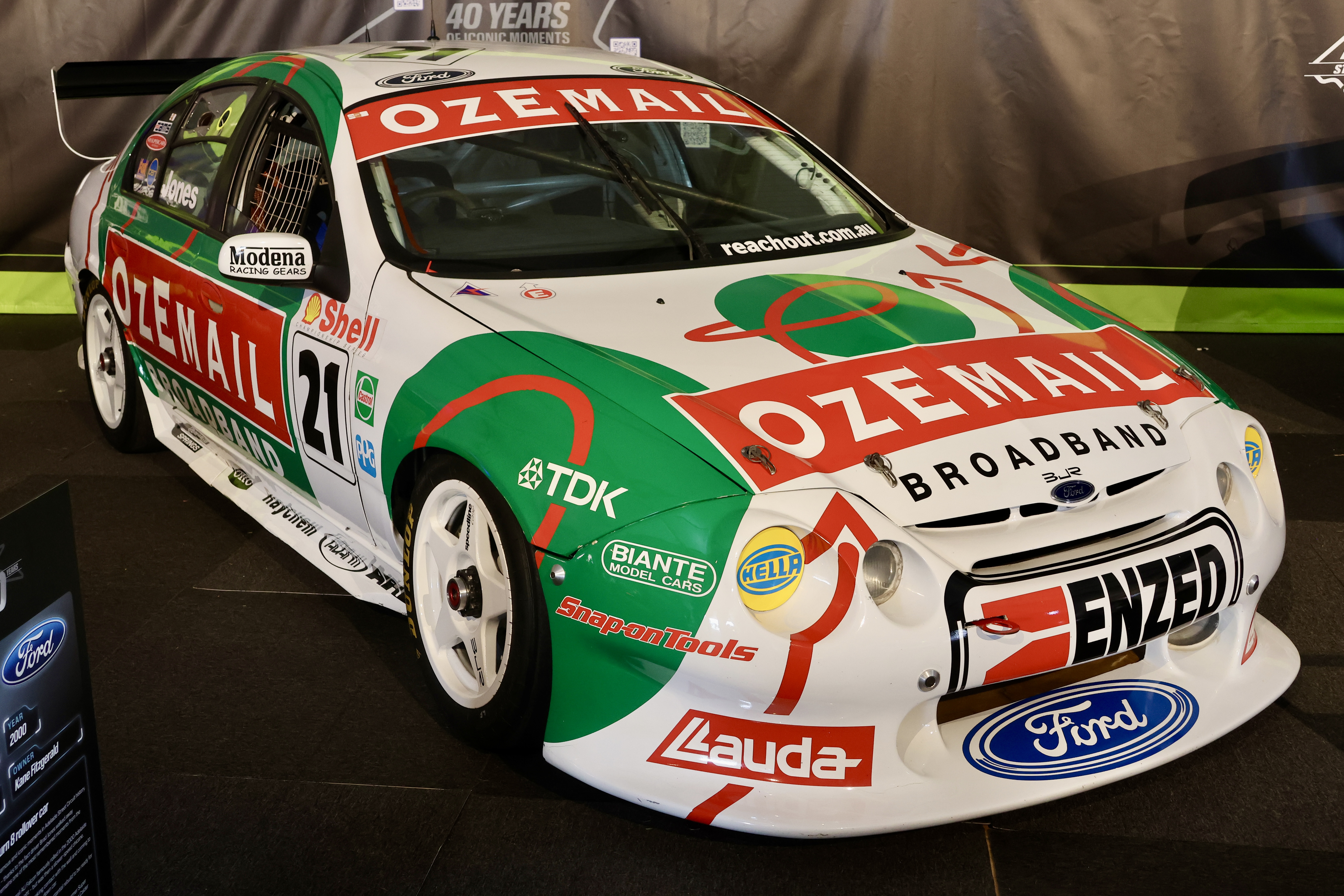
Ford Falcon (AU) of Jones on display at the 2025 Adelaide Grand Final

In 2000, the Jones brothers agreed that it would be a good decision to move to V8 Supercars full-time with their own team, the OzEmail Racing Team. In just the second year after the team was established, Jones and co-driver John Cleland finished second at the 2001 V8 Supercar 1000 at Bathurst after fighting Mark Skaife right to the end of the 1000 kilometre race with a gap at the end of only just over 2 seconds after a 6-hour race.

In 2000, Jones, thanks to his success in Super Touring with Audi, was also drafted into the Audi Sport North America team (run by Joest Racing) for the American Le Mans Series (ALMS) Race of a Thousand Years held on 31 December. This race was run on the Adelaide Street Circuit using the full Grand Prix version of the track rather than the shortened V8 Supercars version. Jones was on standby for lead driver Allan McNish who had injured his back stepping out of his Kilt after a pre-event photo shoot, and although Brad qualified the car, McNish recovered in time to take his place in the Audi R8 LMP, leaving Jones a spectator. McNish and his regular co-driver Rinaldo Capello won the race which also saw McNish crowned the inaugural ALMS Champion.

In 2002, Brad Jones Racing returned to the Mount Panorama Circuit with a two car team, Jones teamed up with John Bowe and led the race for the first 59 laps, setting the fastest ever race lap time in the history of the event at the time. In 2003 BJR didn't finish well but that took a turn in 2004 when the team took 3rd at the mountain.

In 2005, there was a change of team sponsor and the team was now called Team BOC. The team started on a high when Jones and Bowe placed first and second in the V8 Supercar support races at the Australian Grand Prix when they were the only team to choose dry slicks while the others took wet tyres in changing weather conditions. It then swiftly changed for the worse at Bathurst when Jones and the team could only manage 26th qualifying position and on race day were wiped out while charging through the field within the first 10 laps.

In 2006, there was new hope for Jones and the team as they had a new engine supplier, Stone Brothers Racing, and staff changes. But the SBR engine pack lacked reliability and power, which made the engine famous and the team struggled, especially after one of their codrivers (Mark Porter) was killed in an accident at the Bathurst 1000 km round. At the end of the season, long time driver John Bowe left the team and moved to Paul Cruickshank Racing. Jones' nephew, Andrew Jones joined the team after his two years at Garry Rogers Motorsport in 2005 and Tasman Motorsport in 2006.

Jones announced his retirement from full-time racing after the 2007 New Zealand round. His car was driven for the rest of the season by Simon Wills. Jones continues to appear in media roles regularly having taken on guest commentator roles with TV broadcasts over ten years ago, and co-hosted with Neil Crompton, which was hosted by internet provider Telstra Bigpond as part of their V8 Supercar package until it was axed at the end of 2008. Jones continued to drive for his team in an endurance co-driver role, finishing fifth in the 2008 Bathurst 1000. After running as high a third in the 2009 Bathurst 1000 and a career spanning 109 ATCC/V8s races spanning 24 seasons, Jones retired from competitive racing.

== Career results ==
Results sourced from Driver Database.

Season	Series	Position	Car	Team
1981	TAA Formula Ford 'Driver to Europe' Series	6th	Elwyn 002 Ford	Bradley Jones
1982	Australian GT Championship	NC	Mercedes-Benz 450 SLC – Chevrolet	Thomson-Fowler Motorsport
1984	Australian Super Series	7th	Mitsubishi Starion Turbo	Bradley Jones
1984	World Endurance Championship	NC	Mercedes-Benz 450 SLC – Chevrolet	Thomson-Fowler Motorsport
1985	Australian GT Championship	7th	Mercedes-Benz 450 SLC – Chevrolet; Chevrolet Monza	Thomson-Fowler Motorsport
1986	Australian Touring Car Championship	26th	Mitsubishi Starion Turbo	Mitsubishi Ralliart
1986	Australian Endurance Championship	22nd	Mitsubishi Starion Turbo	Mitsubishi Ralliart
1988	Australian Production Car Championship	17th	Mitsubishi Starion Turbo	Brad Jones Racing
1988/89	Australian Superspeedway Series (AUSCAR)	4th	Holden VL Commodore	Kim Jones
1989	Australian Touring Car Championship	10th	Ford Sierra RS500	Mobil 1 Racing
1989/90	Australian Superspeedway Series (AUSCAR)	1st	Holden VL Commodore	CooperTools Racing
1990	Australian Endurance Championship	20th	Holden VL Commodore SS Group A SV	Holden Racing Team
1990/91	Australian Superspeedway Series (AUSCAR)	1st	Holden VN Commodore	CooperTools Racing
1991/92	Australian Superspeedway Series (AUSCAR)	1st	Holden VN Commodore	CooperTools Racing
1992/93	Australian Superspeedway Series (AUSCAR)	1st	Holden VN Commodore	CooperTools Racing
1993/94	Australian Superspeedway Series (AUSCAR)	1st	Holden VP Commodore	Castrol Racing
1994	Australian Super Production Car Series	1st	Lotus Esprit	Lotus Cars Australia
1994/95	Australian Superspeedway Series (NASCAR)	1st	Chevrolet Lumina	Brad Jones Racing
1995	Australian Super Touring Championship	3rd	Audi 80 Quattro	Orix Audi Sport Australia
1996	Australian Super Touring Championship	1st	Audi A4 Quattro	Orix Audi Sport Australia
1997	Australian Super Touring Championship	4th	Audi A4 Quattro	Orix Audi Sport Australia
1998	Australian Super Touring Championship	1st	Audi A4 Quattro	Audi Sport Australia
1999	V8Supercar Championship Series	60th	Ford Falcon AU	Larkham Motor Sport
1999	Australian Super Touring Championship	3rd	Audi A4	Audi Sport Australia
2000	V8Supercar Championship Series	24th	Ford Falcon AU	OzEmail Racing
2000	American Le Mans Series	NC	Audi R8	Audi Sport North America
2001	V8Supercar Championship Series	18th	Ford Falcon AU	OzEmail Racing
2002	V8Supercar Championship Series	15th	Ford Falcon AU	OzEmail Racing
2003	V8Supercar Championship Series	20th	Ford Falcon BA	OzEmail Racing
2004	V8Supercar Championship Series	16th	Ford Falcon BA	Brad Jones Racing
2005	V8Supercar Championship Series	21st	Ford Falcon BA	Brad Jones Racing
2006	V8Supercar Championship Series	25th	Ford Falcon BA	Brad Jones Racing
2008	V8Supercar Championship Series	33rd	Holden VE Commodore	Brad Jones Racing
2009	V8Supercar Championship Series	57th	Holden VE Commodore	Brad Jones Racing

=== Supercars Championship results ===
(Races in bold indicate pole position) (Races in italics indicate fastest lap)

Supercars results
Year	Team	Car	1	2	3	4	5	6	7	8	9	10	11	12	13	14	15	16	17	18	19	20	21	22	23	24	25	26	27	28	29	30	31	32	33	34	35	36	37	38	39	Position	Points
1999	Larkham Motor Sport	Ford Falcon (AU)	EAS; R1	EAS; R2	EAS; R3	ADE; R4	BAR; R5	BAR; R6	BAR; R7	PHI; R8	PHI; R9	PHI; R10	HDV; R11	HDV; R12	HDV; R13	SAN; R14	SAN; R15	SAN; R16	QLD; R17	QLD; R18	QLD; R19	CAL; R20	CAL; R21	CAL; R22	SYM; R23	SYM; R24	SYM; R25	WIN; R26	WIN; R27	WIN; R28	ORA; R29	ORA; R30	ORA; R31	QLD; R32; 16	**BAT**; **R33**; **Ret**							60th	108
2000	Brad Jones Racing	Ford Falcon (AU)	PHI; R1; 17	PHI; R2; 17	BAR; R3; 23	BAR; R4; 25	BAR; R5; 16	ADE; R6; Ret	ADE; R7; Wth	EAS; R8; 12	EAS; R9; 12	EAS; R10; 9	HDV; R11; 11	HDV; R12; 12	HDV; R13; 12	CAN; R14; 27	CAN; R15; 5	CAN; R16; 13	QLD; R17; 21	QLD; R18; 16	QLD; R19; 18	WIN; R20; Ret	WIN; R21; 25	WIN; R22; Ret	ORA; R23; 17	ORA; R24; 9	ORA; R25; 10	CAL; R26; 26	CAL; R27; Ret	CAL; R28; 22	QLD; R29; Ret	SAN; R30; 24	SAN; R31; 19	SAN; R32; 21	BAT; R33; Ret							24th	297
2001	Brad Jones Racing	Ford Falcon (AU)	PHI; R1; 17	PHI; R2; 22	ADE; R3; Ret	ADE; R4; 25	EAS; R5; 6	EAS; R6; 14	HDV; R7; 28	HDV; R8; 11	HDV; R9; 8	CAN; R10; 14	CAN; R11; Ret	CAN; R12; Ret	BAR; R13; 22	BAR; R14; 17	BAR; R15; 28	CAL; R16; 18	CAL; R17; Ret	CAL; R18; 15	ORA; R19; 12	ORA; R20; 13	QLD; R21; Ret	WIN; R22; Ret	WIN; R23; 16	BAT; R24; 2	PUK; R25; 21	PUK; R26; 15	PUK; R27; Ret	SAN; R28; 10	SAN; R29; 12	SAN; R30; 11										18th	1542
2002	Brad Jones Racing	Ford Falcon (AU)	ADE; R1; 20	ADE; R2; 19	PHI; R3; 23	PHI; R4; 18	EAS; R5; 20	EAS; R6; 24	EAS; R7; 17	HDV; R8; 11	HDV; R9; 10	HDV; R10; 10	CAN; R11; 17	CAN; R12; 20	CAN; R13; 12	BAR; R14; 30	BAR; R15; 8	BAR; R16; 4	ORA; R17; 28	ORA; R18; Ret	WIN; R19; 10	WIN; R20; 10	QLD; R21; 9	BAT; R22; 16	SUR; R23; 25	SUR; R24; Ret	PUK; R25; 9	PUK; R26; 13	PUK; R27; 7	SAN; R28; 18	SAN; R29; 16											15th	621
2003	Brad Jones Racing	Ford Falcon (BA)	ADE; R1; 24	ADE; R1; 18	PHI; R3; 15	EAS; R4; Ret	WIN; R5; 26	BAR; R6; 15	BAR; R7; 14	BAR; R8; 15	HDV; R9; 15	HDV; R10; 21	HDV; R11; 10	QLD; R12; Ret	ORA; R13; 12	SAN; R14; 4	BAT; R15; 10	SUR; R16; Ret	SUR; R17; 18	PUK; R18; 22	PUK; R19; 22	PUK; R20; 15	EAS; R21; 16	EAS; R22; 18																		20th	1127
2004	Brad Jones Racing	Ford Falcon (BA)	ADE; R1; 13	ADE; R2; Ret	EAS; R3; 23	PUK; R4; 20	PUK; R5; 20	PUK; R6; 18	HDV; R7; Ret	HDV; R8; 15	HDV; R9; 16	BAR; R10; 12	BAR; R11; 13	BAR; R12; 12	QLD; R13; 12	WIN; R14; 24	ORA; R15; 20	ORA; R16; 31	SAN; R17; 7	BAT; R18; 3	SUR; R19; 13	SUR; R20; Ret	SYM; R21; 12	SYM; R22; 9	SYM; R23; 24	EAS; R24; 19	EAS; R25; 19	EAS; R26; 14														16th	1235
2005	Brad Jones Racing	Ford Falcon (BA)	ADE; R1; 13	ADE; R2; 20	PUK; R3; 22	PUK; R4; Ret	PUK; R5; 20	BAR; R6; 25	BAR; R7; 19	BAR; R8; Ret	EAS; R9; 14	EAS; R10; 11	SHA; R11; 25	SHA; R12; 17	SHA; R13; 10	HDV; R14; 17	HDV; R15; 30	HDV; R16; Ret	QLD; R17; 20	ORA; R18; 23	ORA; R19; 20	SAN; R20; 9	BAT; R21; 21	SUR; R22; 17	SUR; R23; 16	SUR; R24; 28	SYM; R25; 17	SYM; R26; 21	SYM; R27; 19	PHI; R28; 24	PHI; R29; Ret	PHI; R30; 24										21st	1027
2006	Brad Jones Racing	Ford Falcon (BA)	ADE; R1; Ret	ADE; R2; 20	PUK; R3; 22	PUK; R4; Ret	PUK; R5; 18	BAR; R6; 27	BAR; R7; 24	BAR; R8; 23	WIN; R9; 18	WIN; R10; 19	WIN; R11; 22	HDV; R12; 25	HDV; R13; 25	HDV; R14; 24	QLD; R15; 20	QLD; R16; 20	QLD; R17; 19	ORA; R18; 24	ORA; R19; 17	ORA; R20; 9	SAN; R21; 5	BAT; R22; 11	SUR; R23; 15	SUR; R24; 14	SUR; R25; 20	SYM; R26; Ret	SYM; R27; Ret	SYM; R28; Ret	BHR; R29; Ret	BHR; R30; 20	BHR; R31; 19	PHI; R32; 27	PHI; R33; 23	PHI; R34; 20						25th	1612
2007	Brad Jones Racing	Ford Falcon (BF)	ADE; R1; Ret	ADE; R2; 21	BAR; R3; 20	BAR; R4; 27	BAR; R5; 26	PUK; R6; Ret	PUK; R7; 22	PUK; R8; Ret	WIN; R9	WIN; R10	WIN; R11	EAS; R12	EAS; R13	EAS; R14	HDV; R15	HDV; R16	HDV; R17	QLD; R18	QLD; R19	QLD; R20	ORA; R21	ORA; R22	ORA; R23	SAN; R24	BAT; R25	SUR; R26	SUR; R27	SUR; R28	BHR; R29	BHR; R30	BHR; R31	SYM; R32	SYM; R33	SYM; R34	PHI; R35	PHI; R36	PHI; R37			57th	0
2008	Brad Jones Racing	Holden Commodore (VE)	ADE; R1	ADE; R2	EAS; R3	EAS; R4	EAS; R5	HAM; R6	HAM; R7	HAM; R8	BAR; R9	BAR; R10	BAR; R11	SAN; R12	SAN; R13	SAN; R14	HDV; R15	HDV; R16	HDV; R17	QLD; R18	QLD; R19	QLD; R20	WIN; R21	WIN; R22	WIN; R23	PHI; Q 26	PHI; R24; 15	BAT; R25; 5	SUR; R26	SUR; R27	SUR; R28	BHR; R29	BHR; R30	BHR; R31	SYM; R32	SYM; R33	SYM; R34	ORA; R35	ORA; R36	ORA; R37		33rd	343
2009	Brad Jones Racing	Holden Commodore (VE)	ADE; R1	ADE; R2	HAM; R3	HAM; R4	WIN; R5	WIN; R6	SYM; R7	SYM; R8	HDV; R9	HDV; R10	TOW; R11	TOW; R12	SAN; R13	SAN; R14	QLD; R15	QLD; R16	PHI; Q 27	PHI; R17; Ret	BAT; R18; 23	SUR; R19	SUR; R20	SUR; R21	SUR; R22	PHI; R23	PHI; R24	BAR; R25	BAR; R26	SYD; R27	SYD; R28											57th	104

=== Australian Super Touring Championship ===
(Races in bold indicate pole position) (Races in italics indicate fastest lap)

Australian Super Touring Championship results
Year	Team	Car	1	2	3	4	5	6	7	8	9	10	11	12	13	14	15	16	17	18	19	20	Position	Points
1995	Orix Audi Sport Australia	Audi 80 Quattro	PHI; R1	PHI; R2	ORA; R3	ORA; R4	SYM; R5	SYM; R6	CAL; R7	CAL; R8	MAL; R9	MAL; R10	LAK; R11	LAK; R12	WIN; R13	WIN; R14	EAS; R15	EAS; R16					3rd	232
1996	Brad Jones Racing	Audi 80 Quattro	AMA; R1	AMA; R2	LAK; R3	LAK; R4	AMA; R5	AMA; R6	CAL; R7	CAL; R8	MAL; R9	MAL; R10	LAK; R11	LAK; R12	WIN; R13	WIN; R14	EAS; R15	EAS; R16					3rd	232

=== Complete World Sportscar Championship results ===
(key) (Races in bold indicate pole position) (Races in italics indicate fastest lap)

Year	Team	Car	1	2	3	4	5	6	7	8	9	10	11	DC	Points
1984	(Australia) Thomson-Fowler Motorsport	Mercedes-Benz 450 SLC – Chevrolet	MNZ	SIL	LMS	NUR	BHT	MOS	SPA	IMO	FJI	KYL	SAN; DNS	NC	0

† Not eligible for series points

=== Complete World Touring Car Championship results ===
(key) (Races in bold indicate pole position) (Races in italics indicate fastest lap)

Year	Team	Car	1	2	3	4	5	6	7	8	9	10	11	DC	Points
1987	(Japan) Mitsubishi Ralliart	Mitsubishi Starion Turbo	MNZ	JAR	DIJ	NUR	SPA	BNO	SIL	BAT	CLD	WEL	FJI; DNS	NC	0

† Not eligible for series points

=== Complete Asia-Pacific Touring Car Championship results ===
(key) (Races in bold indicate pole position) (Races in italics indicate fastest lap)

Year	Team	Car	1	2	3	4	DC	Points
1988	(Australia) Mitsubishi Ralliart	Mitsubishi Starion Turbo	BAT; 10	WEL	PUK	FJI	NC	0

=== Complete American Le Mans Series results ===
(key) (Races in bold indicate pole position) (Races in italics indicate fastest lap)

Year	Entrant	Class	Chassis	Engine	1	2	3	4	5	6	7	8	9	10	11	12	Rank	Points
2000	(Germany) Audi Sport North America	LMP	Audi R8	Audi 3.6L Twin-Turbo V8	SEB	CHA	SIL	NÜR	SON	MOS	TEX	ROS	PET	MON	LSV	**ADE** ovr:1 cls:1	NC	0

* Jones qualified the race winning #77 Audi R8 in Adelaide (Rinaldo Capello set the pole time) but he did not drive in the race.

=== Complete Bathurst 1000 results ===
Year	Car#	Team	Co-drivers	Car	Class	Laps	Pos.	Class pos.
1985	43	(Australia) Mitsubishi Ralliart	(Australia) Peter Fitzgerald	Mitsubishi Starion Turbo	B	0	DNF	DNF
1986	53	(Australia) Mitsubishi Ralliart	(Japan) Akihiko Nakaya	Mitsubishi Starion Turbo	B	61	DNF	DNF
1988	31	Ralliart Australia	(Australia) Terry Shiel (Australia) Mike Preston	Mitsubishi Starion Turbo	A	145	10th	10th
1989	105	(Australia) Mobil 1 Racing	(New Zealand) Paul Radisich	Ford Sierra RS500	A	153	9th	9th
1990	7	(Australia) Holden Racing Team	(Australia) Neil Crompton	Holden Commodore VL SS Group A SV	A	159	5th	5th
1991	7	(Australia) Holden Racing Team	(Australia) Neil Crompton	Holden Commodore VN SS Group A SV	1	100	DNF	DNF
1992	15	(Australia) Holden Racing Team	(Australia) Tomas Mezera	Holden Commodore VP	C	131	15th	2nd
1993	16	(Australia) Holden Racing Team	(Australia) Wayne Gardner	Holden Commodore VP	A	160	3rd	3rd
1994	015	(Australia) Holden Racing Team	(Australia) Craig Lowndes	Holden Commodore VP	A	161	2nd	2nd
1995	4	(Australia) Wayne Gardner Racing	(United Kingdom) Win Percy	Holden Commodore VR		161	5th	5th
1996	4	(Australia) Wayne Gardner Racing	(Australia) Tony Scott	Holden Commodore VR		23	DNF	DNF
1997*	1	(Australia) Brad Jones Racing	(Germany) Frank Biela	Audi A4 Quattro	ST	161	2nd	2nd
1998*	1	(Australia) Brad Jones Racing	(Australia) Cameron McConville	Audi A4 Quattro	ST	161	3rd	3rd
1998	10	(Australia) Larkham Motor Sport	(Australia) Mark Larkham	Ford Falcon EL		161	4th	4th
1999	10	(Australia) Larkham Motor Sport	(Australia) Mark Larkham	Ford Falcon AU		62	DNF	DNF
2000	21	(Australia) Brad Jones Racing	(Australia) Tomas Mezera	Ford Falcon AU		159	DNF	DNF
2001	21	(Australia) Brad Jones Racing	(United Kingdom) John Cleland	Ford Falcon AU		161	2nd	2nd
2002	21	(Australia) Brad Jones Racing	(Australia) John Bowe	Ford Falcon AU		158	16th	16th
2003	21	(Australia) Brad Jones Racing	(Australia) John Bowe	Ford Falcon BA		159	10th	10th
2004	12	(Australia) Brad Jones Racing	(Australia) John Bowe	Ford Falcon BA		161	3rd	3rd
2005	21	(Australia) Brad Jones Racing	(Australia) John Bowe	Ford Falcon BA		125	21st	21st
2006	14	(Australia) Brad Jones Racing	(Australia) John Bowe	Ford Falcon BA		161	11th	11th
2008	14	(Australia) Brad Jones Racing	(Brazil) Max Wilson	Holden Commodore VE		161	5th	5th
2009	14	(Australia) Brad Jones Racing	(Australia) Andrew Jones	Holden Commodore VE		145	23rd	23rd

* Super Touring races

=== Complete Bathurst 24 Hour results ===
Year	Team	Co-drivers	Car	Class	Laps	Pos.	Class pos.
2002	(Australia) Prancing Horse Racing Scuderia	(Australia) John Bowe (Australia) Paul Morris (Australia) John Teulan	Ferrari 360 N-GT	1	96	DNF	DNF

Sporting positions
Preceded by Tony Kavich	Winner of the Australian AUSCAR Championship; 1989–90, 1990–91, 1991–92, 1992–93 and 1993–94	Succeeded by Marshall J Brewer
Preceded by Barry Graham	Winner of the Australian NASCAR Championship; 1994–95	Succeeded by Jim Richards
