= 2005 Australian GT Championship =

Motor racing competition

Seasons
- ← 1985 2006 →

The 2005 Australian GT Championship was an Australian motor racing competition for "closed production based sports cars". It was sanctioned by the Confederation of Australian Motor Sport (CAMS) as a "National Championship".

It was the ninth Australian GT Championship and the first to be held since 1985. CAMS revived the GT Championship after the demise of the Australian Nations Cup Championship at the end of 2004.

The championship was won by Bryce Washington driving a Porsche 911 GT3 Cup.

== Entries ==
| Entrant | Car | No. | Driver | Rounds |
|---|---|---|---|---|
| Brennanit | Porsche 996 GT2 R | 3 | (Australia) David Stevens | 3 |
| Crickcars.com.au | Dodge Viper GTS ACR | 3 | (Australia) Greg Crick | 5 |
| Consolidated Chemicals Co. | Ferrari 360 GT | 4 | (Australia) Ted Hulgin | All |
| Team Lamborghini Australia | Lamborghini Diablo GTR | 5 | (Australia) Peter Hackett | All |
| Team Lamborghini Australia | Lamborghini Diablo GTR | 6 | (Australia) Rusty French | 1 |
| Darcy Russell | Dodge Viper GTS ACR | 7 | (Australia) Darcy Russell | 4 |
| Simon Middleton | Porsche 911 GT3 | 8 | (Australia) Simon Middleton | 1–4 |
| Geoff Munday | Ford Mustang Cobra R | 10 | (Australia) Geoff Munday | 4 |
| Don Tryhorn | Porsche 964 Carrera | 11 | (Australia) Don Tryhorn | All |
| Mark Eddy | Porsche 911 GT3 R | 12 | (Australia) Mark Eddy | 1, 3–5 |
| Greg Ward Racing | Porsche 911 GT3 Cup Car | 14 | (Australia) Greg Ward | 1, 3 |
| CAF Nautilus | Porsche 911 GT3 Cup Car | 17 | (Australia) Rob McMillan | 3 |
| Max Twigg Racing | Porsche 993 RSR | 18 | (Australia) Max Twigg | 2–4 |
| Team Mongrel | Honda NSX | 20 | (Australia) Ian Palmer | All |
| CGA Bryson Developments | Ferrari 360 Challenge | 25 | (Australia) Neil Bryson | 2–5 |
| Paul Stuart | Porsche 993 RSR | 27 | (Australia) Paul Stuart | 1 |
| Claudie Giorgi | Porsche 911 GT3 | 29 | (Australia) Claudie Giorgi | 1–3 |
| Lynn's Building Materials | Porsche 911 GT3 | 32 | (Australia) Malcolm Lynn | 2–5 |
| Anthony R Moodie | Porsche 911 Carrera | 37 | (Australia) Anthony R Moodie | 1, 4 |
| Anthony R Moodie | Porsche 993 RSCS | 38 | (Australia) Matthew Jones | 4 |
| Sedgman Pty Ltd | Porsche 911 GT3 | 40 | (Australia) Russell Kempnich | 2, 4 |
| Song Zu | Porsche 993 RSCS | 41 | (Australia) Matt Humphreys | 2–3 |
| Travelplan Ski Holidays | Porsche 911 GT3 | 46 | (Australia) Anthony Skinner | 3 |
| Wiffens Fruit & Veg | Porsche 993 RSCS | 48 | (Australia) David Giugni | 3, 5 |
| Trevor John | Porsche 944 Turbo | 49 | (Australia) Trevor John | 1, 3–4 |
| Bryce Washington | Porsche 911 GT3 Cup Car | 54 | (Australia) Bryce Washington | All |
| Dean Savage | Ferrari 360 Challenge | 57 | (Australia) Dean Savage | 2 |
| Kevin Miller | Porsche 911 GT3 | 58 | (Australia) Kevin Miller | 4 |
| Garth Rainsbury | Porsche 911 GT3 | 65 | (Australia) Garth Rainsbury | 1, 4 |
| Speed Energy Drinks | Ferrari 360 Challenge | 66 | (Australia) Ross Lilley | 5 |
| J.K Burke | Porsche 911 GT3 | 68 | (Australia) Kim Burke | 3 |
| John Kaias | Porsche 911 GT3 | 77 | (Australia) John Kaias | All |
| Assetval P/L | Porsche 911 GT3 RS | 81 | (Australia) Phillip Holzberger | 2 |
| John Teulan | Ferrari 360 Challenge | 88 | (Australia) John Teulan | 1–4 |

== Schedule ==
The title was contested over a five-round series with three races per round.

| Round | Circuit | State | Date | Round winner | Car |
| 1 | Phillip Island | Victoria | 21–22 May | Peter Hackett | Lamborghini Diablo GTR |
| 2 | Queensland Raceway | Queensland | 2–3 July | Ian Palmer | Honda NSX |
| 3 | Eastern Creek | New South Wales | 22–24 July | Peter Hackett | Lamborghini Diablo GTR |
| 4 | Phillip Island | Victoria | 20–21 August | Peter Hackett | Lamborghini Diablo GTR |
| 5 | Wakefield Park | New South Wales | 12–13 November | Greg Crick | Dodge Viper GTS ACR |

== Points system ==
Championship points were awarded on a 38-32-28-25-23-21-19-18-17-16-15-14-13-12-11-10-9-8-7-6-5-4-3-2-1 basis to the first 25 classified finishers in each race. An additional 3 points were awarded to the fastest qualifier at each round.

== Results ==
| Position | Driver | No. | Car | Entrant | Phi | Que | Eas | Phi | Wak | Total |
|---|---|---|---|---|---|---|---|---|---|---|
| 1 | Bryce Washington | 54 | Porsche 911 GT3 Cup | Adrad Radiators | 92 | 70 | 99 | 99 | 102 | 462 |
| 2 | Peter Hackett | 5 | Lamborghini Diablo GTR | Team Lamborghini Australia | 117 | 79 | 114 | 104 | - | 414 |
| 3 | Ian Palmer | 20 | Honda NSX | Instant Foundation | 28 | 87 | 84 | 78 | - | 277 |
| 4 | John Teulan | 88 | Ferrari 360 Challenge | Industry Central - Stahlwille | 69 | 77 | 73 | 44 | - | 263 |
| 5 | Neil Bryson | 25 | Ferrari 360 Challenge | CGA Bryson Developments | - | 71 | 63 | 76 | - | 210 |
| 6 | Claude Giorgi | 27 | Porsche 996 GT3 | Claude Giorgi | 61 | 71 | 69 | - | - | 201 |
| 7 | Ted Huglin | 4 | Ferrari 360 GT | Consolidated Chemicals Co | 36 | 59 | 59 | - | - | 154 |
| 8 | Greg Crick | 3 | Dodge Viper GTS ACR | Crickcars.Com.Au | - | - | - | - | 111 | 111 |
| 9 | Dean Savage | 57 | Ferrari 360 Challenge | Dean Savage | 42 | 47 | - | - | - | 89 |
| 10 | Mark Eddy | 12 | Porsche 996 GT3 R | Mark Eddy | 78 | - | - | - | - | 78 |
| 11 | Geoff Munday | 10 | Ford Mustang Cobra RA | Jim Beam Racing | - | 18 | - | 58 | - | 76 |
| 12 | Ross Lilley | 66 | Ferrari 360 Challenge | Speed Energy Drinks | - | - | - | - | 65 | 65 |
| 13 | Garth Rainsbury | 66 | Ferrari 360 Challenge | Garth Rainsbury | - | - | - | 63 | - | 63 |
| 14 | Rusty French | 6 | Lamborghini Diablo GTR | Team Lamborghini Australia | 55 | - | - | - | - | 55 |
| 15 | D'Arcy Russell | 7 | Dodge Viper GTS ACR | D'Arcy Russell | - | - | - | 38 | - | 38 |

== Australian Porsche Drivers Challenge ==
The Australian Porsche Drivers Challenge, which was run concurrently with the Australian GT Championship, was won by Bryce Washington.
