= 1985 Australian GT Championship =

Motor racing competition

Seasons
- ← 1984 2005 →

The 1985 Australian GT Championship was the eighth Australian GT Championship and the fourth to be decided over a series of races. It was open to GT Cars complying with CAMS Group D regulations with Group B Sports Sedans and superseded Group C Touring Cars competing by invitation. The title was contested over six rounds from 24 March to 25 August 1985.

The championship was won by Bryan Thomson driving a Chevrolet Monza and a Mercedes-Benz 450 SLC Chevrolet for Thomson-Fowler Motorsport.

The Australian GT Championship was discontinued after 1985 however the title was reinstated for 2005.

== Schedule ==
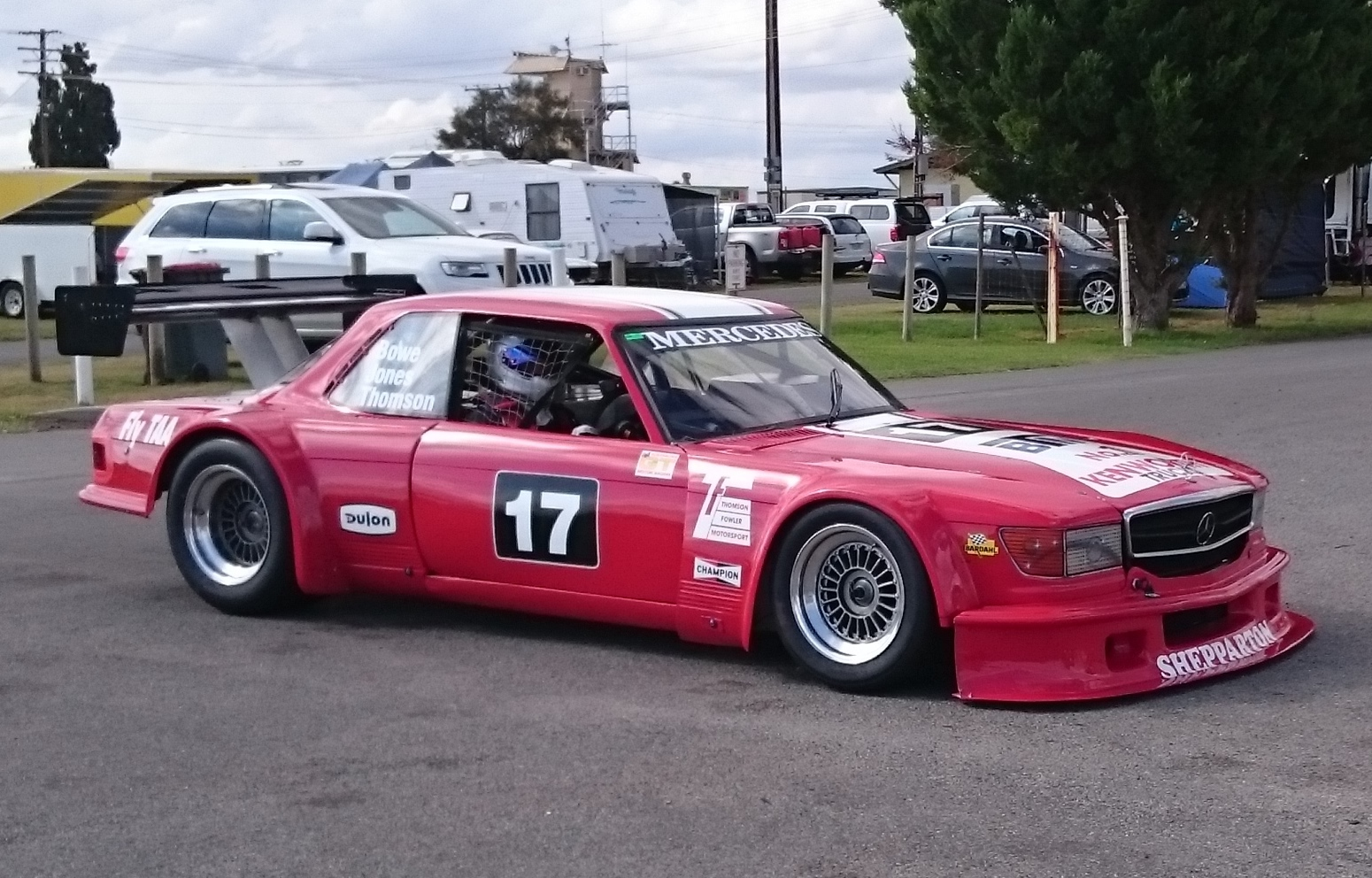
The Mercedes-Benz 450 SLC that Bryan Thomson drove in the 1985 Australian GT Championship, pictured in 2017.

Round	Circuit	Date	Format	Race winner(s)	Round winner	Round winning car
1	Lakeside International Raceway	24 March	One race	Bryan Thomson	Bryan Thomson	Chevrolet Monza
2	Oran Park Raceway	5 May	Two heats	Brad Jones; Kevin Bartlett	Bryan Thomson	Mercedes-Benz 450 SLC Chevrolet
3	Winton Motor Raceway	2 June	Two heats	Kevin Bartlett; Kevin Bartlett	Kevin Bartlett	De Tomaso Pantera
4	Adelaide International Raceway	30 June	One race	Bryan Thomson	Bryan Thomson	Chevrolet Monza
5	Calder Park Raceway	11 August	One race	Kevin Bartlett	Kevin Bartlett	De Tomaso Pantera
6	Surfers Paradise Raceway	25 August	One race	Bryan Thomson	Bryan Thomson	Chevrolet Monza

Note : Rounds were run concurrently with those of the 1985 Australian Sports Car Championship.

== Points system ==
For rounds contested over a single race, i.e. Rounds 1, 4, 5 & 6, championship points were awarded on a 30-27-24-21-19-17-15-14-13-12-11-10-9-8-7-6-5-4-3-2 basis to the top twenty finishers in the round.

For rounds contested over two races, i.e. Rounds 2 & 3, championship points were awarded by allocating race points on a 30-27-24-21-19-17-15-14-13-12-11-10-9-8-7-6-5-4-3-2 basis to the top twenty finishers in each race, aggregating the points from the two races and then dividing the result by two. (Race points allocated for these races are shown in the table below within brackets)

== Championship standings ==
Pos	Driver	No.	Car	Entrant	Lak	Ora R1	Ora R2	Ora	Win R1	Win R2	Win	Ade	Cal	Sur	Total
1	Bryan Thomson	14; 17	Chevrolet Monza & Mercedes-Benz 450 SLC - Chevrolet	Thomson-Fowler Motorsport	30	(24)	(27)	25.5	(27)	(24)	25.5	30	24	30	165
2	Peter Fitzgerald	3	Porsche Carrera RSR	Peter Fitzgerald / Stanilite Electronics	24	(27)	(24)	25.5	(24)	(27)	25.5	27	21	-	123
3	John Bourke	77	Toyota Celica Turbo	Brian Hilton Toyota	27	(19)	-	9.5	(21)	(19)	20	-	-	24	80.5
4	Kevin Bartlett	5	De Tomaso Pantera	Paul Halstead / The Toy Shop	-	-	(30)	15	(30)	(30)	30	-	30	-	75
5	Peter McLeod	50	Mazda RX-7	Petrolon Slick 50	-	-	(21)	10.5	(19)	(21)	20	24	-	-	54.5
6	Gary Scott	104	Nissan Bluebird Turbo	Tapsall-Scott Racing	-	(17)	(19)	18	-	-	-	-	-	27	45
7	Brad Jones	17; 14	Mercedes-Benz 450 SLC - Chevrolet & Chevrolet Monza	Thomson-Fowler Motorsport	-	(30)	-	15	-	-	-	-	27	-	42
8	Simon Harrex	69	Holden Commodore		21	-	-	-	-	-	-	-	-	-	21
8	Cos Monterosso	30	Ford Escort BDG	Cos Monterosso	-	-	-	-	-	-	-	21	-	-	21
8	Vic Cameron	96	Ford Escort		-	-	-	-	-	-	-	-	-	21	21
11	John Gurney	9	BMW 318i Turbo	Coolratio Motor Sports	-	-	-	-	-	-	-	19	-	-	19
11	Graeme Whincup	6	Chevrolet Monza	Graeme Whincup	-	-	-	-	-	-	-	-	19	-	19
13	Peter Finch	16	Chrysler Valiant Charger	Peter Finch	-	-	-	-	-	-	-	17	-	-	17
14	Brian Callaghan	47	Ford XE Falcon	Mobile Concrete Pumping	-	(15)	(17)	16	-	-	-	-	-	-	16
15	Graham Nowland	81	Mazda RX-7		-	(13)	(15)	14	-	-	-	-	-	-	14
16	Chris Hones	91	BMW 318i Turbo		-	(21)	-	10.5	-	-	-	-	-	-	10.5
17	Robin Doherty	27	Holden Torana	Robin Doherty	-	(14)	-	7	-	-	-	-	-	-	7
