= Australian Stock Car Auto Racing =

Auto racing sanctioning body

- Category: Stock cars
- Country: Australia
- Inaugural season: 1988
- Folded: 1999
- Manufacturers: Ford, Holden
- Engine suppliers: Ford, Holden
- Tire suppliers: Goodyear

AUSCAR (Australian Stock Car Auto Racing) was an auto racing sanctioning body owned by Bob Jane, which ran American-style superspeedway stock car racing in Australia from 1988 to 1999.

The initial AUSCAR venue was the Calder Park Thunderdome in Melbourne, a 1.801 km (1.119 mi), high-banked (24°) oval track. Over time the series expanded to include the Jane owned 1/2 mile (805 metre) Speedway Super Bowl at the eastern end of Adelaide International Raceway which first saw AUSCAR racing in 1990 (the Super Bowl was only other paved oval circuit in Australia with only 7° banking in the corners making it essentially a traditional flat track), the Surfers Paradise Street Circuit, and eventually several Australian road racing circuits including Calder Park's road course and the Oran Park Raceway in Sydney, where racing was held under lights on the short version of the circuit. In the early 1990s, Jane and television station Channel 7 announced plans to turn the old Granville Showground trotting track which circled the Parramatta Speedway in Sydney into a paved, banked 1/2 mile track, but this did not happen.

Four categories of racing car were developed to run on the Australian circuits:

- NASCAR: imported and locally developed versions of the American race cars. Engines were 6.0L V8s
- AUSCAR: down spec-ed cars, closer to production specification with a control road tyre, The category comprised the Holden Commodore and Ford Falcon. After 1990/91, engines were restricted to 5.0L V8s.
- Formula Falcon: Lasted the one season and was absorbed into Sportsman, ran the Ford Falcon.
- Sportsman: lower specification again, cheaper to buy or build and older cars, and some former AUSCARs. Like AUSCAR, the category comprised the Commodore and Falcon. Engine restrictions saw Holdens use the 4.2L 253 V8 and Fords use de-tuned 5.0L 302 V8s.

Other categories, such as the HQs, a relatively cheap category based on the Holden HQ Kingswood powered by the 3.3L Holden red motor, were also popular at the Calder Park Thunderdome (as the HQs were Australian-made cars, like the AUSCARs they raced clockwise on the ovals). Another category was based on the American dirt track category known as Legends (similar in appearance, but unrelated to Aussie Racing Cars). Open-wheel cars such as Formula Vee also raced on occasion at the Thunderdome as a support to the NASCAR / AUSCAR races, as did the Dirt track racing Grand Nationals for a few meetings in 1990.

== AUSCAR category ==
AUSCAR was also the name used for the second tier racing category that raced alongside the Australian NASCAR stock car racing series, starting in 1988 and continuing until 2001. The cars were not pure space frame chassis like NASCAR, but were built on Australian Holden Commodore and Ford Falcon road car chassis. As a result, AUSCARs are right-hand-drive and race clockwise on oval tracks, compared to the left-hand-drive, anticlockwise NASCAR vehicles - the theory being that the driver is located at the furthest point possible from the outside retaining walls. AUSCARs were also restricted to running 5.0 litre Holden and Ford V8 engines, though initially the Ford XF Falcons used the 5.8L 351 Cleveland V8 engines (despite the road going XFs not carrying the V8 as Ford Australia had stopped production of the engine in 1983), but subsequent Falcons (from the EB model which in 1991 re-introduced the Ford V8 to the Australian market for the first time in 8 years) would run the 5.0L V8. Commodore teams were also free to use the Group A size 4.9L Holden V8 engine, though unlike in Group A racing using the 4.9L engine did not come with an overall weight reduction for the car. As the Group A engine also cost more, all Holden competitors stuck with the 5.0L engines.

The 5.0L AUSCAR engines were strictly controlled and developed around 390 bhp (291 kW; 395 PS) compared to the 700 bhp (522 kW; 710 PS) of the larger and more highly developed, 366 cubic inch (6.0L) engines used in NASCAR, and as a result AUSCARs were slower than their American counterparts (at the Thunderdome, NASCAR stock cars were capable of around 305 km/h (190 mph) while AUSCARs had a top speed of approximately 265 km/h (165 mph)). Like the NASCAR engines of the time, the engines used in AUSCAR were carbureted rather than having fuel injection like the road going V8s used by Holden and Ford. AUSCARs also used a Goodyear Eagle control road tyre that was buffed down (leaving only around 2mm of tread) and relatively narrow compared the wide, purpose built slick racing tyres used in NASCAR. One thing in AUSCARs' favour was that they only weighed in at 2,910 lb (1,320 kg) compared to the 3,400 lb (1,500 kg) NASCAR stock cars. Although they weighed less, as a result of using smaller, less powerful engines and the road tyre, AUSCARs were generally around 15 mph (24 km/h), or around four seconds per lap, slower than the NASCAR stock cars around the Thunderdome.

Tony Kavich won the first ever AUSCAR championship in 1988. However, in a shock to the male dominated motor racing establishment, the first ever AUSCAR race at the Thunderdome (which was also the first race to exclusively use the track), the aptly named AUSCAR 200, was won by 18-year-old Melbourne based female driver Terri Sawyer driving a Holden VK Commodore. Sawyer had qualified her Commodore on the front row of the grid and ran at or near the front all day to win from Kim Jane (the nephew of Calder owner Bob Jane), Max de Jersey, Phil Brock and Graham Smith. For the first AUSCAR race, all cars were either the VK or VL Commodore, the XF Falcons not appearing until the 2nd meeting. Greg East driving a VK Commodore sat on pole for the AUSCAR 200 with a time of 33.2 seconds for an average speed of 121.34 mp/h.

While Sawyer would remain very competitive in the early years of the category, the early days were dominated by Jim Richards in his XF Falcon. Though it was Albury panel shop owner and Group E/Group A driver Brad Jones who would come to dominate the category, winning five consecutive titles during the peak of the series popularity, all in various model Commodores. Other notable drivers include: Greg East, Steve Harrington, Mark Seaton, Marshall J. Brewer, Gregg Hansford, Terry Wyhoon, Garry Rogers, Russell Ingall, John Faulkner, Steven Richards (the son of inaugural champion Jim), Tony Kavich, Nathan Pretty and his sister Nicole, Jason Whylie, Eddie Abelnecia and Leigh Watkins who was the only driver to win the championship driving a Falcon. Even Australian touring car legend Peter Brock briefly tried AUSCAR in 1988 driving an XF Falcon (after his 1987 split with Holden). Brock qualified 3rd for his first race, the 1988 Goodyear AUSCAR 200 and actually led for a number of laps until a split radiator saw him spin into retirement. To his credit, Brock later admitted that he wasn't comfortable racing on the high-speed ovals and his time in the category only lasted a couple of meetings. He did return however for his testimonial race meeting held on the Calder Park short (road) circuit in 1995 driving a VR Commodore.

Due to the returning popularity of the Australian Touring Car Championship, relaunched as V8 Supercars in 1997, as well as financial difficulties and other problems such as Bob Jane's long-running "feud" with the Confederation of Australian Motor Sport (CAMS), which saw CAMS ban its members from competing in the series, robbing it of a number of leading drivers, AUSCAR was quietly shut down and the drivers dispersed into other national racing series.

Several cars were converted to Future Tourers to race in that series from 1999 onwards. The Future Tourers went on to run with the declining Australian Super Touring Championship 2.0L cars. The combined Future Tourer/Super Tourer series folded in 2002.Some AUSCARs that did not compete in Future Tourers were restored and now compete in Stock Cars Australia competition, such examples being the #6 Ford Falcon and the #22 Holden Commodore.

== Champions ==
| Season | Driver | Car | Team |
|---|---|---|---|
| 1988 | Tony Kavich | Holden VL Commodore | Tony Kavich Racing |
| 1989–90 | Brad Jones | Holden VL Commodore | CooperTools Racing |
| 1990–91 | Brad Jones | Holden VN Commodore | CooperTools Racing |
| 1991–92 | Brad Jones | Holden VP Commodore | Castrol Racing |
| 1992–93 | Brad Jones | Holden VP Commodore | CooperTools Racing |
| 1993–94 | Brad Jones | Holden VP Commodore | Castrol Racing |
| 1994–95 | Marshall J Brewer | Holden VR Commodore | Fastrack Racing |
| 1995–96 | Terry Wyhoon | Holden VR Commodore | BP Car Care |
| 1996–97 | Matthew White | Holden VR Commodore | |
| 1997–98 | Darren McDonald | Holden VS Commodore | |
| 1998–99 | Leigh Watkins | Ford EF Falcon | Leigh Watkins Racing |

== See also ==
- NASCAR in Australia
