= NASCAR in Australia =

American stock car racing in Australia

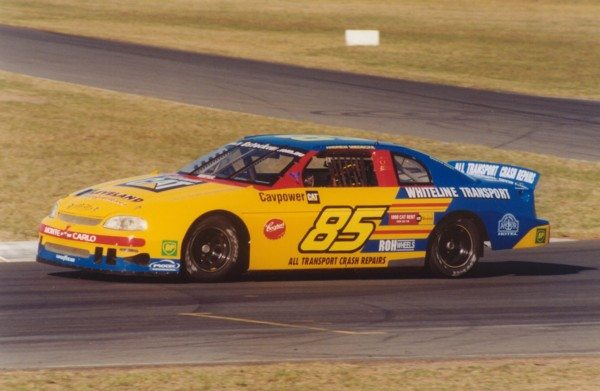
The final Australian champion, Andrew Miedecke (Chevrolet Monte Carlo) at Queensland Raceway in 2001.

The American stock car racing category NASCAR raced in Australia from the late 1980s to the early 2000s. After strong initial interest, particularly in Melbourne at Australia's only purpose-built NASCAR style paved oval speedway, the Calder Park Thunderdome, the category collapsed in the early 2000s before returning in the 2010s with OzTruck and Stock Cars Australia.

Bringing NASCAR to Australia was the creation of four-time Australian Touring Car Championship and Bathurst 500 winner, Bob Jane, whose personal A$54m investment created the Thunderdome at the Calder Park Raceway, modelled on a scaled-down version of the Charlotte Motor Speedway. Australian NASCAR racing was sanctioned by Jane's Australian Stock Car Auto Racing (AUSCAR) authority on behalf of NASCAR in America but the relationship between the two was tenuous and drifted over time. AUSCAR was also the name of the second-tier category with cars based on the Australian made Holden Commodore and Ford Falcon running 5.0L V8 engines.

In 1987 with the completion of the Calder Park Thunderdome extensions the much delayed first NASCAR race late in the 1987 racing season with the first major event, the 1988 Goodyear NASCAR 500 following on February 28, 1988. Initially Winston Cup drivers such as Neil Bonnett, Bobby Allison, Michael Waltrip, Dave Marcis and Kyle Petty visited the Thunderdome but interest waned over time and big-name guest drivers were lured from circuit racing to bolster fields. Star touring car drivers Allan Grice and Dick Johnson were both early supporters of the concept, with both travelling to the US to race in the Winston Cup Series, although success was limited. Another touring car star in Kiwi Jim Richards also raced successfully in NASCAR in Australia.

At the Thunderdome, the top speed for the NASCAR's was around 300 km/h (186 mph). This compared to the Australian-based AUSCAR's (which while also using smaller V8 engines, ran on road tyres rather than racing slicks) which had a top speed of approximately 265 km/h (165 mph)).

Like in the United States, many of the NASCAR drivers in Australia came from the ranks of dirt track speedway, with drivers such as Barry Graham, Gene Cook, Robin Best, George Elliot, Terry Byers, Neville Lance, Terry Wyhoon, Todd Wanless, and Max Dumesny all being regulars in the series. NASCAR, like the AUSCAR series, also attracted a number of touring car drivers such as Charlie O'Brien, Greg Murphy, Russell Ingall, and the final ever series champion Andrew Miedecke. Other drivers included Bob Jane's son Rodney Jane and his nephew Kim Jane (his brother's son) who were also race winners in both AUSCAR and NASCAR, and in the case of Kim Jane a four-time NASCAR series champion. NASCAR in Australia also saw a number of drivers successfully move from AUSCAR, including Brad Jones who won five straight AUSCAR titles before winning his first series in NASCAR, and John Faulkner.

As popular V8 powered sedans became less successful in the Australian Touring Car Championship due to Group A being dominated by imported turbocharged cars such as the Ford Sierra RS500 and various Nissan Skylines, NASCAR arrived in Australia at exactly the right time to exploit a dissatisfaction within Australian race fans and crowds were initially promising, although they faded. The installation of lights at the Thunderdome for night racing in 1991 brought crowds back to peak levels and for the next five years enjoyed success. This success was limited though with only one circuit available.

While most of the cars used were those seen in America at the time such as the Chevrolet Monte Carlo, Chevrolet Lumina, Ford Thunderbird, Oldsmobile Cutlass, Oldsmobile Delta 88, Buick LeSabre, and Pontiac Grand Prix, locally developed Holden Commodore's and Ford Falcon's were also raced with Allan Grice notably driving a VN Commodore to several wins in 1990, while Jim Richards also raced an EA Falcon with some success.

In 1990 the 1/2-mile (805 metre) Speedway Super Bowl at the eastern end of the Bob Jane owned Adelaide International Raceway also saw NASCAR racing, giving the category the chance to run on both a high banked speedway and a traditional flat short track. The slower Super Bowl was a welcome addition to the series as it offered a new challenge with its short straights and much tighter turns which unlike the 24° banking at the Dome that allowed for high speed, was only 7° at AIR. When compared to the much faster Thunderdome, the Bowl earned the reputation of a bull-ring (NASCAR's lapped the Thunderdome at over 140 mph (225 km/h) while lapping Adelaide at around 78 mph (126 km/h)). NASCAR continued to run a single round of the series in Adelaide until the series folded in 2001. In 1992, plans were announced by Bob Jane and Channel 7 in Sydney (with help from speedway promoter and Seven's lead motor racing commentator Mike Raymond) to turn the 1/2 mile long trotting track at the Granville Showground that surrounded Sydney's Parramatta Speedway into a banked paved oval, thus giving a third oval track for the series to use. However, the plans never got past the planning stage.

The Australian NASCARs were supporters of the Gold Coast Indy 300 run by CART on the Surfers Paradise Street Circuit during the early years when CAMS sanctioned categories ignored the race meeting in 1992 giving the category its first run on a road course in Australia. NASCARs only other regular stop became Sydney's Oran Park Raceway from the mid-1990s, with the cars ran under lights and utilised the shorter 1.96 km road course rather than the 2.6 km Grand Prix circuit. Throughout its run in Australia, NASCAR never ventured west of Adelaide and never went off the mainland which limited its audience (though this didn't stop Tasmanian drivers from competing, such as the winner of the first two Australian championships, Robin Best).

It was at Oran Park in 1995 where 1993 500cc Grand Prix motorcycle World Champion, American Kevin Schwantz, made his NASCAR debut. Schwantz won that race at Oran Park driving a Chevrolet Lumina and later went on to be a regular in the NASCAR Busch Series in the United States, chose to "cut his teeth" in the more relaxed Australian championship to gain valuable experience rather than jump straight into the cut and thrust of the more professional American series.

Occasional forays onto other circuit began during the 1990s, first to Eastern Creek Raceway in Sydney before also racing as a support category at the Bathurst 1000 with the cars regularly being faster than the V8 Touring cars on the Mount Panorama Circuits 1.1 km long Conrod Straight, reaching over 310 km/h (193 mph), though overall lap times were approximately 10 seconds per lap slower than the made for road racing V8 tourers.

By the end of the 1990s, the popularity of the series had fallen below viability with rounds cancelled in 2000, and with major sponsors favouring the heavily televised V8 Supercars, the series moved to an exclusively road course calendar in 2001 and was renamed V8 Stock Cars, The 2001 season was a road race series with races at Mallala, Queensland Raceway, Oran Park (twice), Winton, with the final round being held at the Calder Park Raceway.

The 2002 season was abandoned after races were held at Mallala, Oran Park and Queensland Raceway due to the collapse of The Power Tour; Andrew Miedecke was leading the championship after Queensland Raceway.

Revival efforts continued through the 2000s and 2010s, Bob Jane attempted to get things going with the Holden Monaro, the Stockcar Australia Road Series was attempted followed by Historic Stock Car Racing Series Australia and a revival finally gained some traction with the introduction of OzTrucks to Australia before Stock Cars Australia arrived on the scene under the leadership of Brian Walden before Zac O'Hara taken over leadership duties and Stock Cars Australia brought Stock Car racing home to Calder Park Raceway in August 2023.

Stock Cars Australia is currently holding stock car races in Australia, they race at locations such as One Raceway, Sydney Motorsport Park, The Bend, Winton Raceway and Calder Park Raceway, they use a combination of Cup cars, Xfinity Series cars, AUSCARs, OzTrucks and GTA's, Jeff Stubbs was the 2025 champion in the #45 Dodge Challenger.

== Champions ==
Season	Driver	Car	Team
1989–90	Robin Best	Chevrolet Monte Carlo	N/A
1990–91	Robin Best	Ford Thunderbird	N/A
1991–92	George Elliot	Chevrolet Lumina	NASTRACK
1992–93	Max Dumesny	Oldsmobile Cutlass	John Sidney Racing
1993–94	Barry Graham	Oldsmobile Cutlass	John Sidney Racing
1994–95	Brad Jones	Chevrolet Lumina	Brad Jones Racing
1995–96	Jim Richards	Pontiac Grand Prix	Dick Midgley Racing
1996–97	Kim Jane	Chevrolet Monte Carlo	Bob Jane T-Marts
1997–98	Kim Jane	Chevrolet Monte Carlo	Bob Jane T-Marts
1998–99	Kim Jane	Chevrolet Monte Carlo	Bob Jane T-Marts
1999–2000	Kim Jane	Chevrolet Monte Carlo	Bob Jane T-Marts
2000–01	No Thunderdome races		
2001	Andrew Miedecke	Chevrolet Monte Carlo	Whiteline Racing
2002	Andrew Miedecke	Chevrolet Monte Carlo	Whiteline Racing
