= Mercedes-Benz SLC-Class =

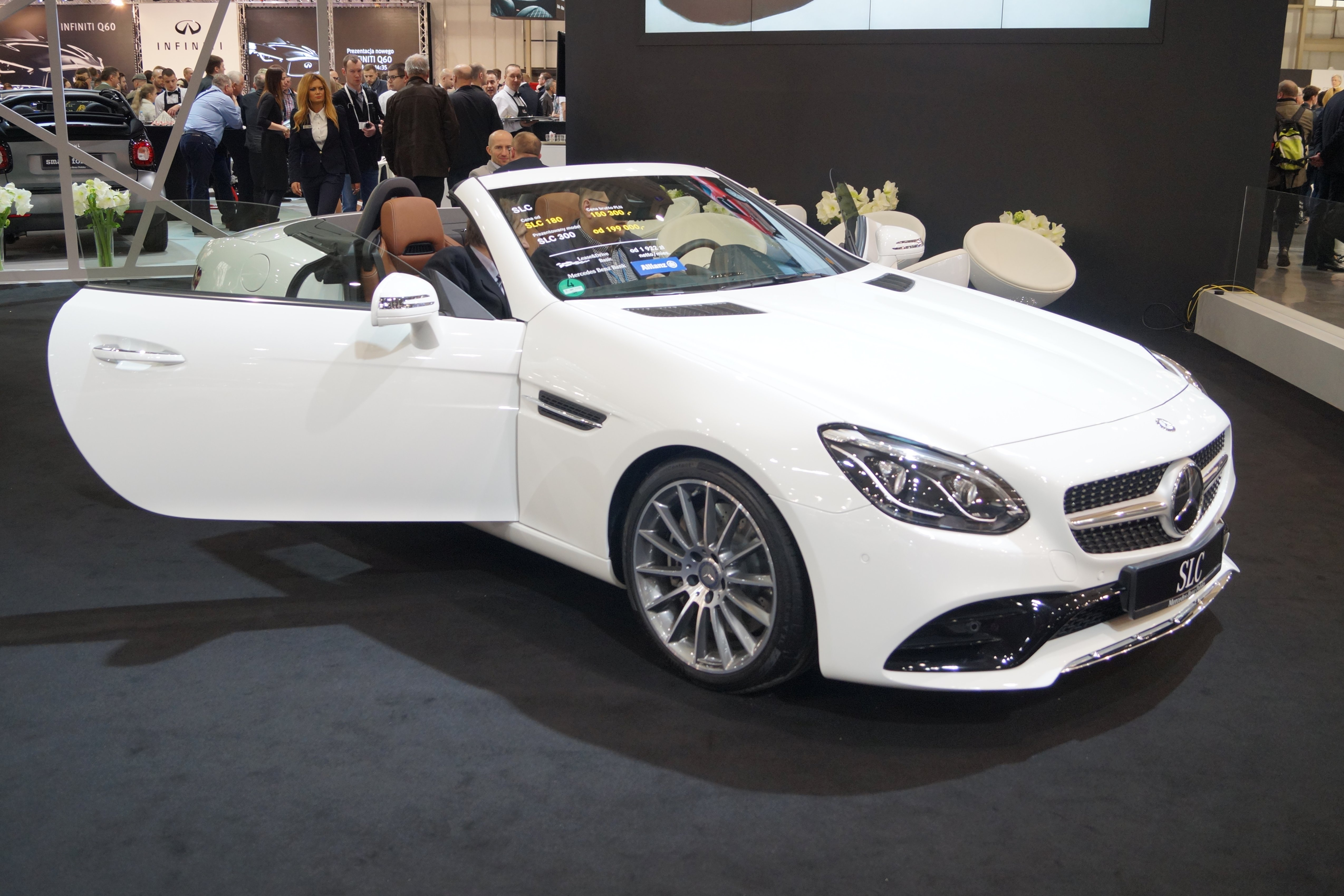
Mercedes Benz SLC 300

Mercedes-Benz SLC-Class can designate:

- The hard-top coupé counterpart of the Mercedes-Benz R107 produced from 1971 to 1981
- The Mercedes-Benz R172, the successor of the Mercedes-Benz SLK-Class R171, produced from 2016 to 2020
