= Holden Torana =

Australian mid-size car

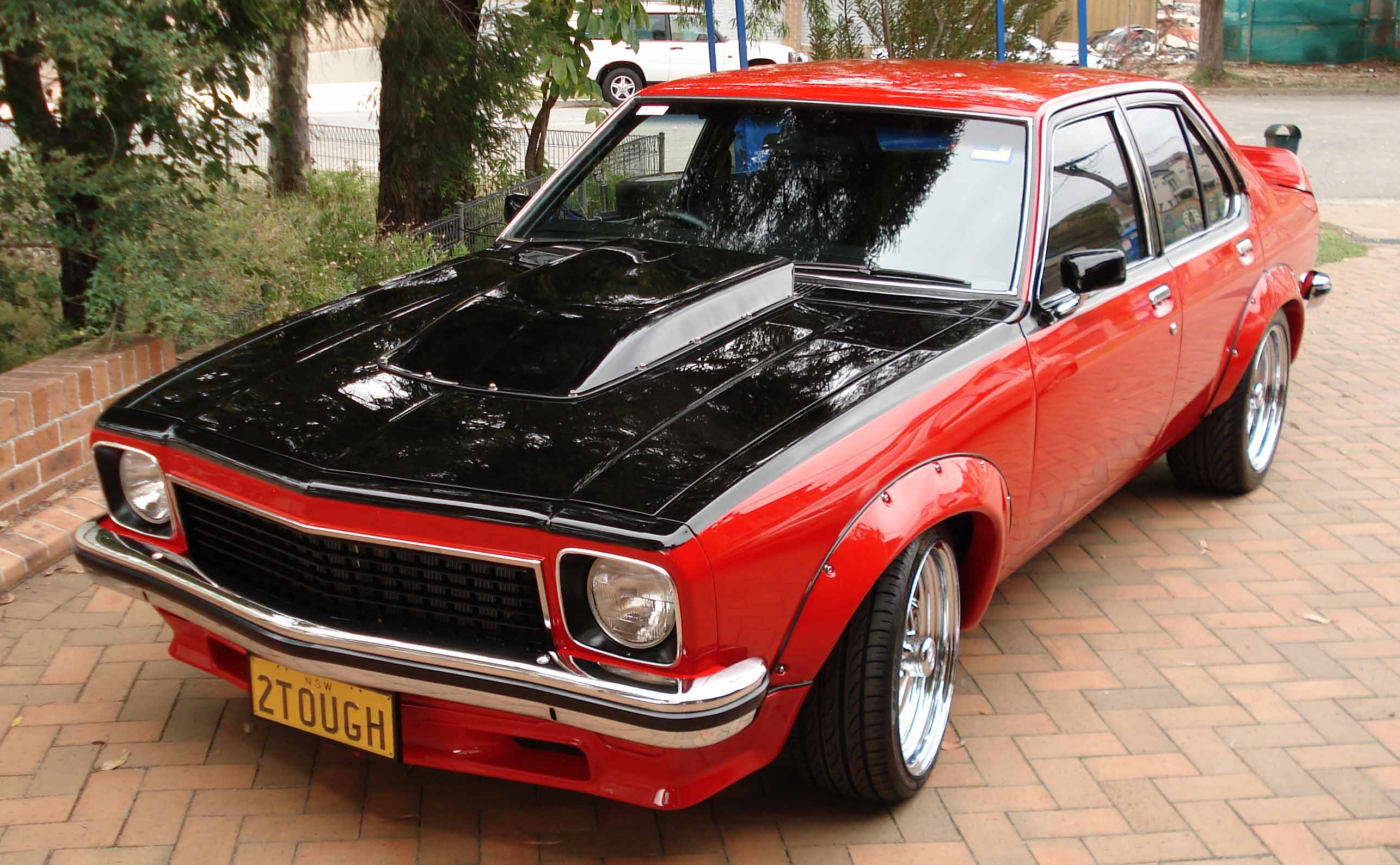
- Holden Torana (LX) SLR 5000 A9X Sedan

Overview
- Manufacturer: Holden
- Also called: Holden Sunbird (4 cylinder version)
- Production: 1967–1980
- Assembly: Australia: Adelaide, South Australia (Elizabeth), Brisbane, Queensland (Acacia Ridge)

Body and chassis
- Class: Compact car/Mid-size car
- Layout: Front-engine, rear-wheel-drive

Chronology
- Successor: Holden Camira

The Holden Torana is a mid-size car that was manufactured by Holden from 1967 to 1980. The name apparently comes from a word meaning "to fly" in an unconfirmed Aboriginal Australian language. The original HB series Torana was released in 1967 and was a four-cylinder compact vehicle closely based on the British Vauxhall Viva HB series of 1966–1970.

Whilst the 1969–1973 (LC and LJ series) cars included more popular, longer-wheelbase six-cylinder versions, and with the 1974–1977 (LH and LX series) cars adding eight-cylinder versions to the mix, a range of four-cylinder versions continued for the entire production life of the Torana (with later four-cylinder versions being marketed as the Holden Sunbird from November 1976).

In South Korea, the LJ Torana was produced locally as the Chevrolet 1700 (시보레 1700, 1972–1976) and Saehan Camina (새한 카미나, 1976–1978).

Changing tack in Australian motor sport, Holden released the LC Torana GTR XU-1 in 1970, with performance-enhanced drivetrain and handling. From this time through to the release of the Holden Commodore, the Torana remained Holden's most successful sports/performance vehicle, with many victories garnered in rallying and circuit racing.

The introduction of the VB Commodore in 1978 was preceded by the arrival of the updated UC Torana/Sunbird twins, but with no sports versions or V8 engine options. The Torana was subsequently discontinued in 1979, followed by the four-cylinder Sunbird in 1980.

== First generation ==
=== HB ===
HB Torana
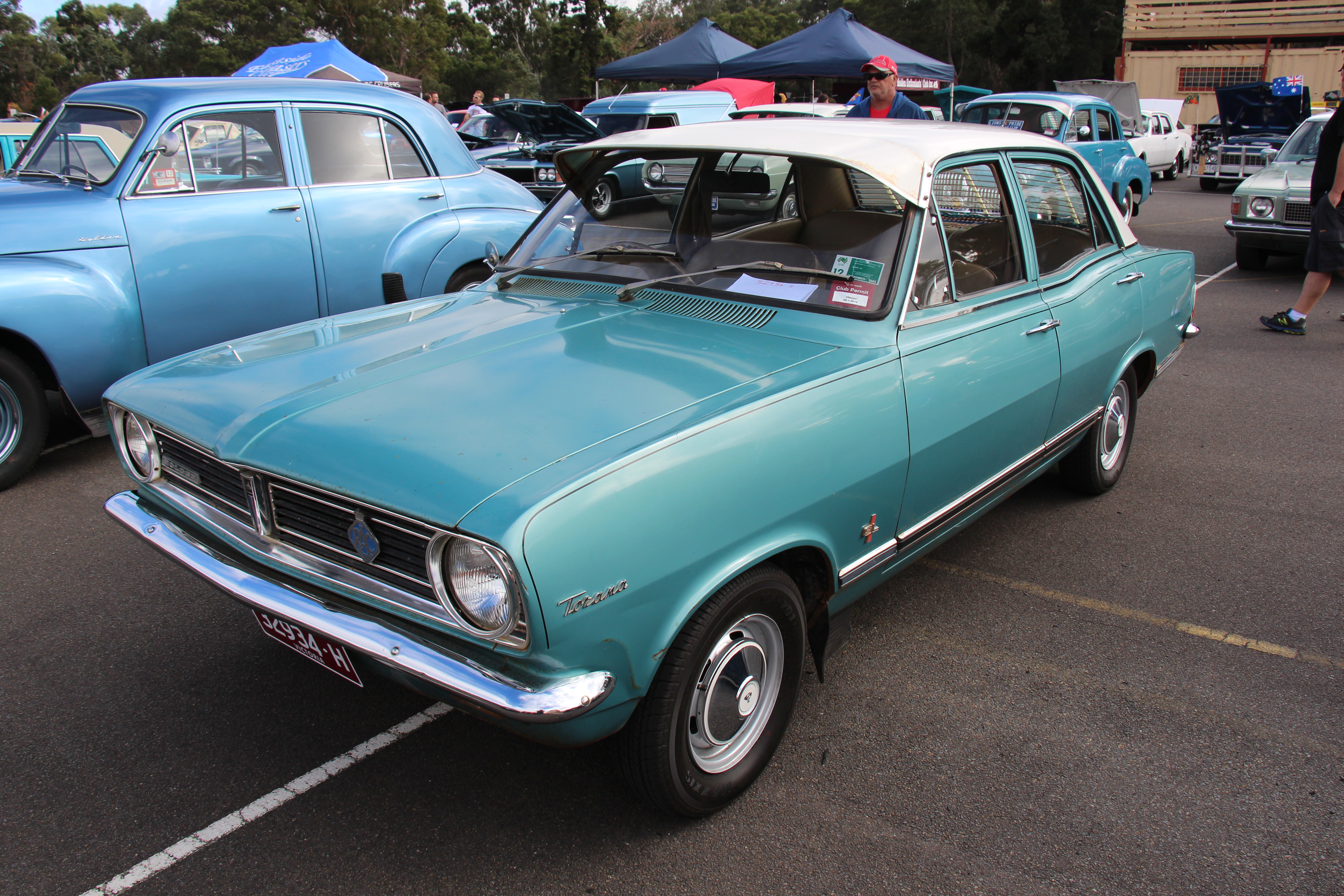

Overview
- Production: 1967–1969
- Designer: Leo Pruneau

Body and chassis
- Body style: 2/4-door sedan
- Related: Vauxhall Viva HB

Powertrain
- Engine: 1159 cc OHV I4

Introduced in May 1967 to replace the HA series Vauxhall Viva in the Australian market, the first Torana model was a mildly facelifted HB series Vauxhall Viva. It featured a two-door body, 12-inch (305-mm) wheels, and a 56-bhp 1.2-litre four-cylinder engine mated to a four-speed gearbox. A Borg-Warner Model 35 three-speed automatic transmission was optional. Drum brakes were fitted front and rear, with power-assisted front disc brakes optional. In terms of styling, the only points of visual difference between Viva and Torana were in the grille and headlamps, the rear tail panel (no registration plate recess), the deletion of the Viva's dashboard air vents, the wheel trims, and the badging. Holden's HB Torana sedan was produced in three model specifications: Torana, Torana S, and Torana SL ... these models effectively mirrored the concurrent larger HR Holden sedans with their three-tiered specification of Standard, Special, and Premier.

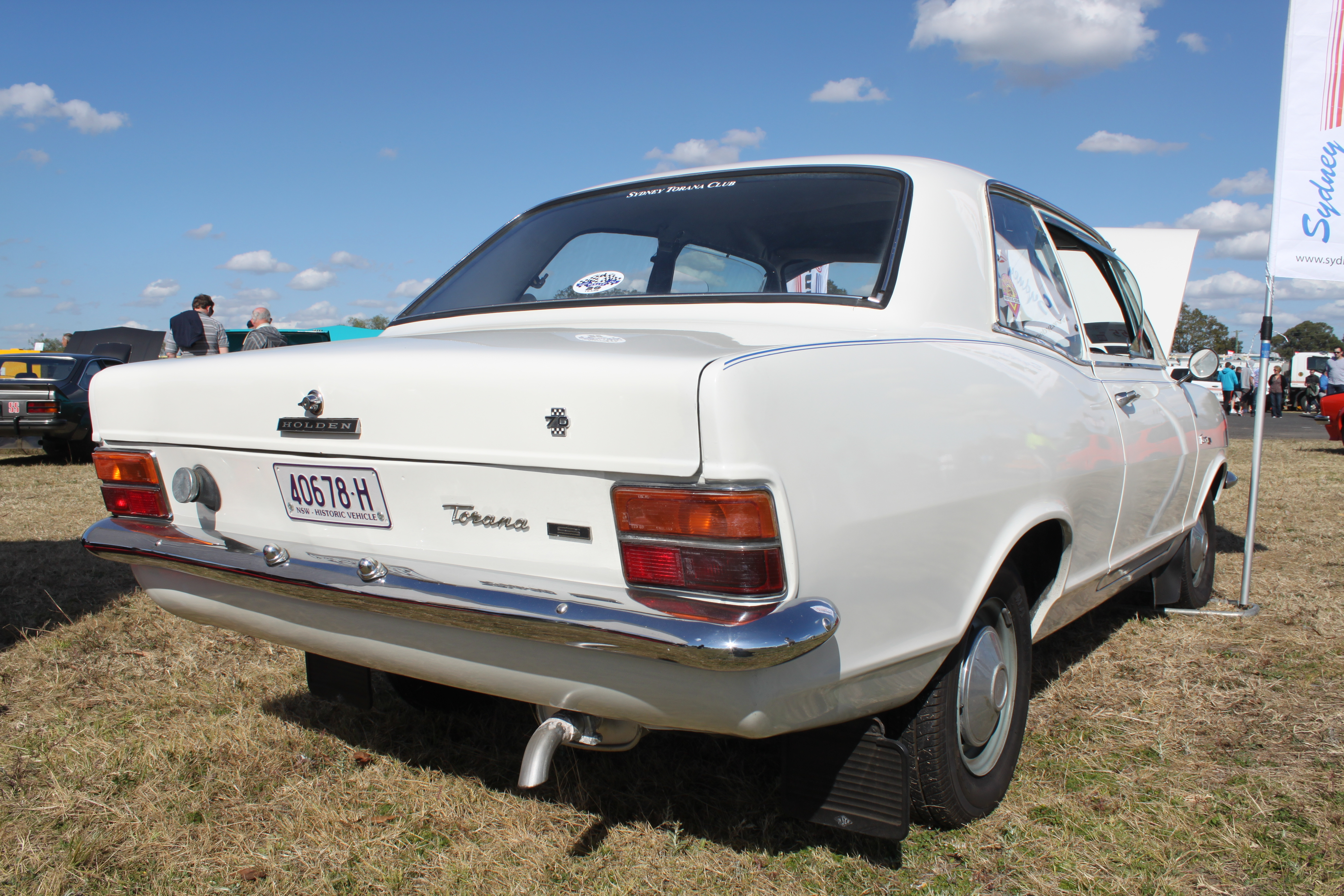
Holden Torana (HB) S 2-door

A 'sports' option package was released in October 1967, called the 'Brabham' Torana, named in honour of the Australian race driver, Sir Jack Brabham, who at the time was the reigning F1 World Champion and Australian of the Year for 1966. The Brabham Torana's engine featured twin CD Zenith-Stromberg carburettors fitted with individual sports air cleaners. Together with a low-restriction exhaust system, power was boosted to 79 bhp (59 kW; 80 PS). The Brabham option (available only with manual transmission on Torana S or Torana SL) also included wider wheel rims and red-wall tyres, power-assisted front disc brakes, black body accents, and subtle 'Brabham' identification badges attached to the leading edges of the front fenders and to the rear boot lid.

In early 1968, a "Series 70" engine option (equivalent to the '90' option for the British Vauxhall Viva) was added. This engine had a higher compression ratio and higher-lift camshaft (adapted from the Brabham option engine) and a single CD Zenith-Stromberg carburettor, which boosted output to 69 bhp (51 kW; 70 PS). Power-assisted front disc brakes were standardised with this engine, whilst availability of the automatic transmission option shifted exclusively to the "Series 70" engine option (no longer available with the standard 56 bhp (42 kW; 57 PS) engine).

In September 1968, the '69 Torana' was released, sometimes called the HB Series II. This featured locally made body panels, replacing the imported bodies of the original HB. The model lineup now included a four-door sedan—some media claimed this design was developed in Australia, with four-door bodies shipped back to the UK to be constructed and sold as the Viva saloon. However, the Vauxpedia website, after extensive research with Vauxhall, maintains that the four-door was designed in England, to compete with Ford's four-door Escort, and both Holden and Vauxhall made their own body panels for their respective Torana and Viva versions. A collapsible steering column was now fitted, together with a new recessed instrument cluster, new indicator switch, and new steering wheel borrowed from the contemporary full-sized Holden HK-series. These local components replaced the previously imported Vauxhall items. A consequence of using these local components was the loss of the stalk-operated headlight dip switch and horn. The dip switch ended up on the floor, as was the case for full-sized Holdens. Dual-circuit brakes were now standard on all models, though power-assisted front disc brakes were still optional with the standard 56 bhp (42 kW; 57 PS) engine. The Brabham Torana became an independent model in its own right—(option XS5) based upon the Torana S two-door sedan—complete with bold specific 'Brabham Torana' badging front and rear and on the flanks, and new black accent body decoration. Its interior specification included a sports steering wheel (from the contemporary Holden HK Monaro GTS) and uniquely comprehensive dash instrumentation with tachometer and three supplementary gauges.

The HB Torana continued until late 1969. Total production was 16,318 with imported panels and 20,243 with the locally manufactured bodies.

== Second generation ==
=== LC ===
LC
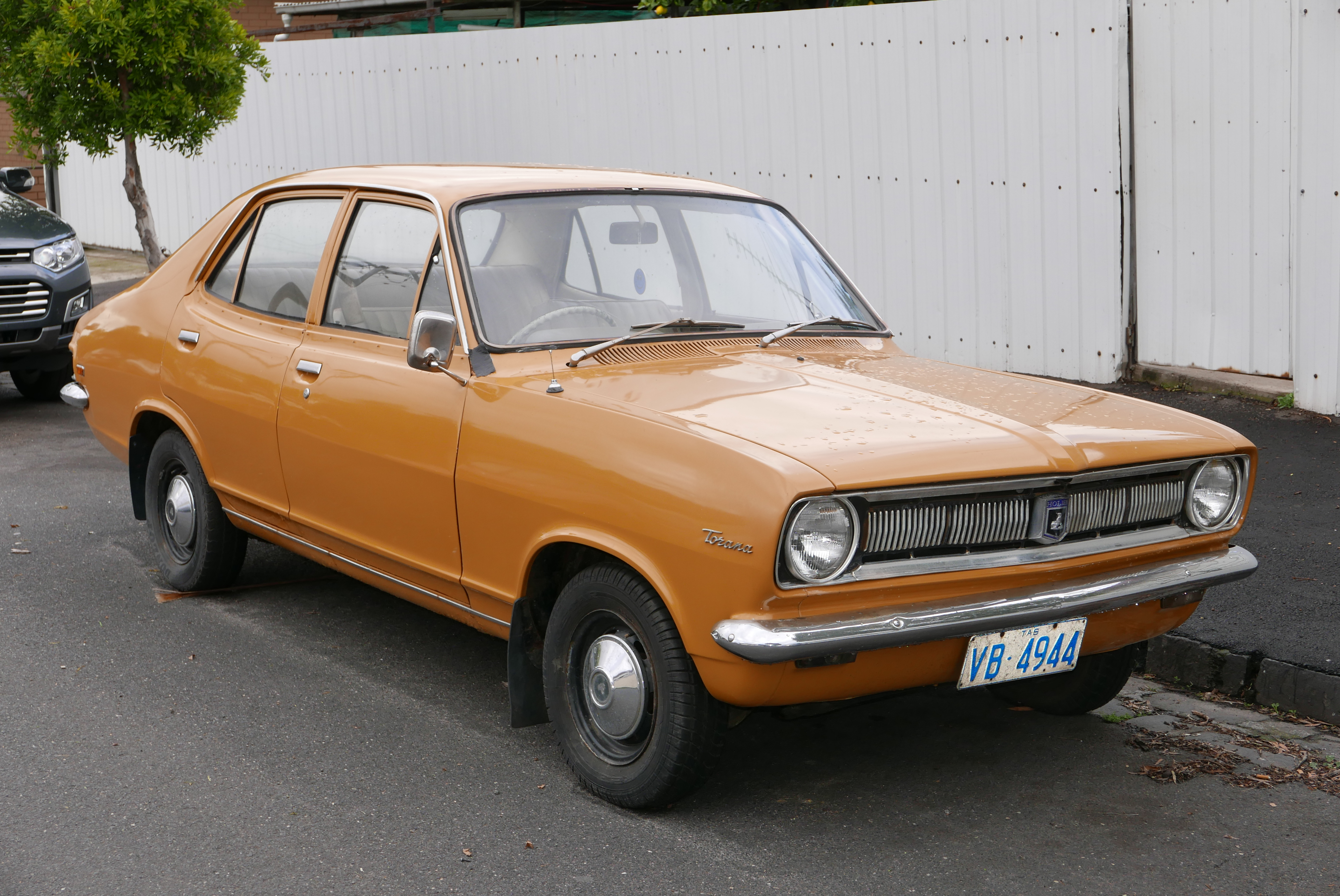
- Holden Torana (LC) Deluxe 1200 4-door

Overview
- Production: 1969–1972
- Designer: Leo Pruneau

Body and chassis
- Body style: 2-door sedan 4-door sedan

Powertrain
- Engine: 1159 cc OHV I4; 1599 cc OHC I4; 130 cu in (2,130 cc) GMH 130 OHV I6 (Export); 138 cu in (2,262 cc) GMH 2250 OHV I6; 161 cu in (2,639 cc) GMH 2600 OHV I6; 173 cu in (2,835 cc) GMH 2850 OHV I6; 186 cu in (3,049 cc) GMH 186 OHV I6

Dimensions
- Wheelbase: 2,430 mm (96 in); 2,540 mm (100 in)
- Length: 4,120 mm (162 in); 4,380 mm (172 in)
- Width: 1,600 mm (63 in)
- Curb weight: 805–835 kg (1,775–1,841 lb) (Torana 4); 950–1,010 kg (2,090–2,230 lb) (Torana 6)

The next generation of Holden Torana, the LC-series, appeared in October 1969 and was made available with a range of a four-cylinder or six-cylinder engines. The inline six had a capacity of 138 cu in (badged as the '2250'); a 161 cu in engine (badged as the '2600') was optional. The six-cylinder cars had a longer wheelbase (100 inches against the 95.8 inches (2,430 mm) of four-cylinder models), a more aggressively styled and longer nose to accommodate the larger engines, and offered a choice of three-speed column shift or four-speed floor shift manual transmissions or the new locally GM-manufactured 'Trimatic' three-speed automatic transmission with column or floor shift. A bench front seat was available for some column shift models. The LC Torana won Wheels magazine's Car of the Year award for 1969.

The four-cylinder engine was initially of 1,159 cc, and offered either 56 or 69 hp (42 or 51 kW). The more powerful Brabham Torana engine was not carried over to the LC-series and the model itself was also discontinued. In July 1971, a bigger overhead cam 1.6-litre engine with 80 hp (60 kW) was added; this engine was also sourced from Vauxhall in the UK. The 1600 OHC engine option also included a strengthened gearbox.

Body styles were based upon the previous HB-series, but the new six-cylinder cars were of a significantly different external appearance. All LC Toranas shared a new body shape rear of the 'B' pillar, but shared windscreen and front doors carried over from the HB-series (modified with the recessed door handles now required by Australian Design Rules [ADRs]; further to this, all LC four-cylinder cars carried over HB body panels forward of the 'A' pillar. The LC-series was available in two-door and four-door versions of base (four-cylinder only), S, or SL specification, as well as a two-door sports model called the GTR. The new Torana GTR effectively replaced the previous series' Brabham Torana, but raised the performance level significantly with its uniquely specified '2600S' six-cylinder engine.

As for general features, a three-person front bench seat became available as an option for four-door S and SL six-cylinder models. Later in production (July 1971), the 161-ci engine was replaced with a larger 173-ci version (badged as the '2850') which also made it into the last of the LC GTR cars as the '2850S'.

In August 1970, the first ultra-performance Torana, the GTR XU-1, was developed by Holden along with Harry Firth of the Holden Dealer Team for competing in Series Production touring car racing within Australia, as well as in off-road rallying and rallycross events. However, the main purpose of the Torana GTR XU-1 was to keep the Holden brand competitive against the larger and more powerful Ford Falcon GT-HO in the Hardie-Ferodo 500 (Bathurst) endurance race that some consider to be the jewel in the crown of Australian motorsport.

The LC Torana GTR XU-1 was equipped with a 160 hp (119 kW), 186-cu in (3-litre) six-cylinder engine, fitted with three Zenith-Stromberg CD-150 carburettors, cast-iron headers, a performance cylinder head and camshaft, and the heavy-duty Australian-designed four-speed manual gearboxes (available in a number of different ratios) replacing the weaker Opel units. This car also featured an underbody front chassis air dam, a rear bobtail spoiler, wider steel wheel rims, and front disc brakes as standard equipment. The Torana GTR XU-1 proved to be a strong performer on both the road and track due to its favourable power/weight ratio. It soon gained popularity in Australian motor sport and successfully replaced the V8 Monaro GTS 350 as Holden's frontline track race car in 1970, winning many touring car and rally events, but for the famed Bathurst 500-mile (800 km) race which Ford won in 1970 and 1971 with its XW Phase Two and XY Phase Three Falcon GT-HOs, respectively.

Holden built a total of 74,627 LC Toranas.

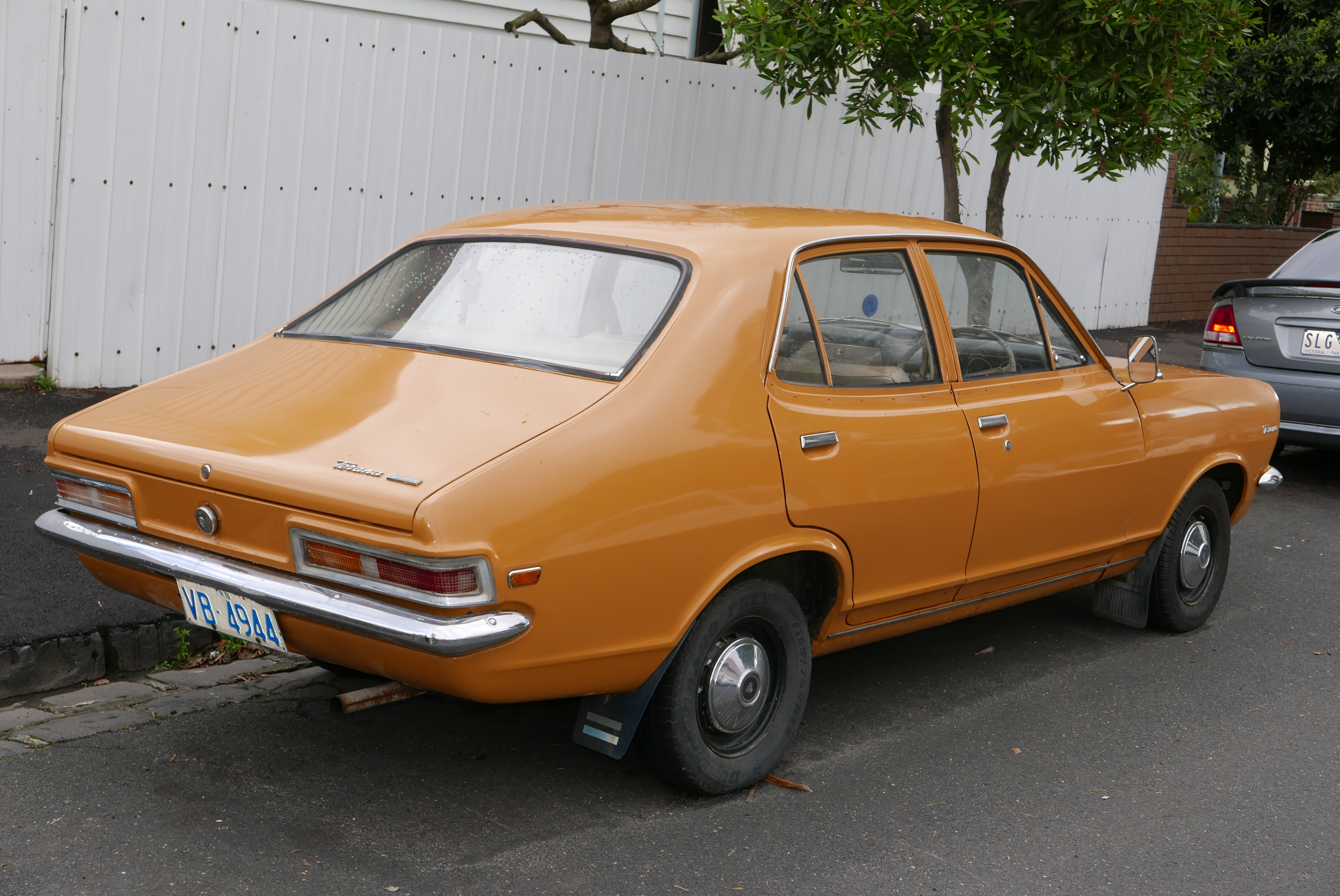
Holden LC Torana Deluxe 1200 4-door

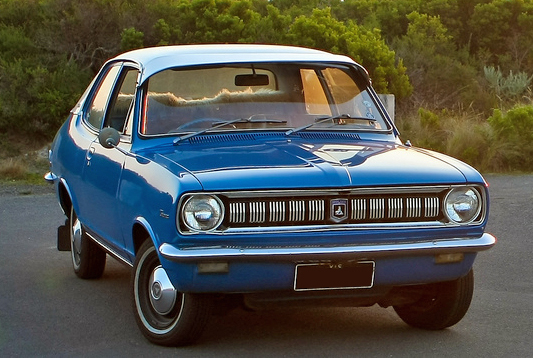
Holden LC Torana SL four-cylinder 2-door

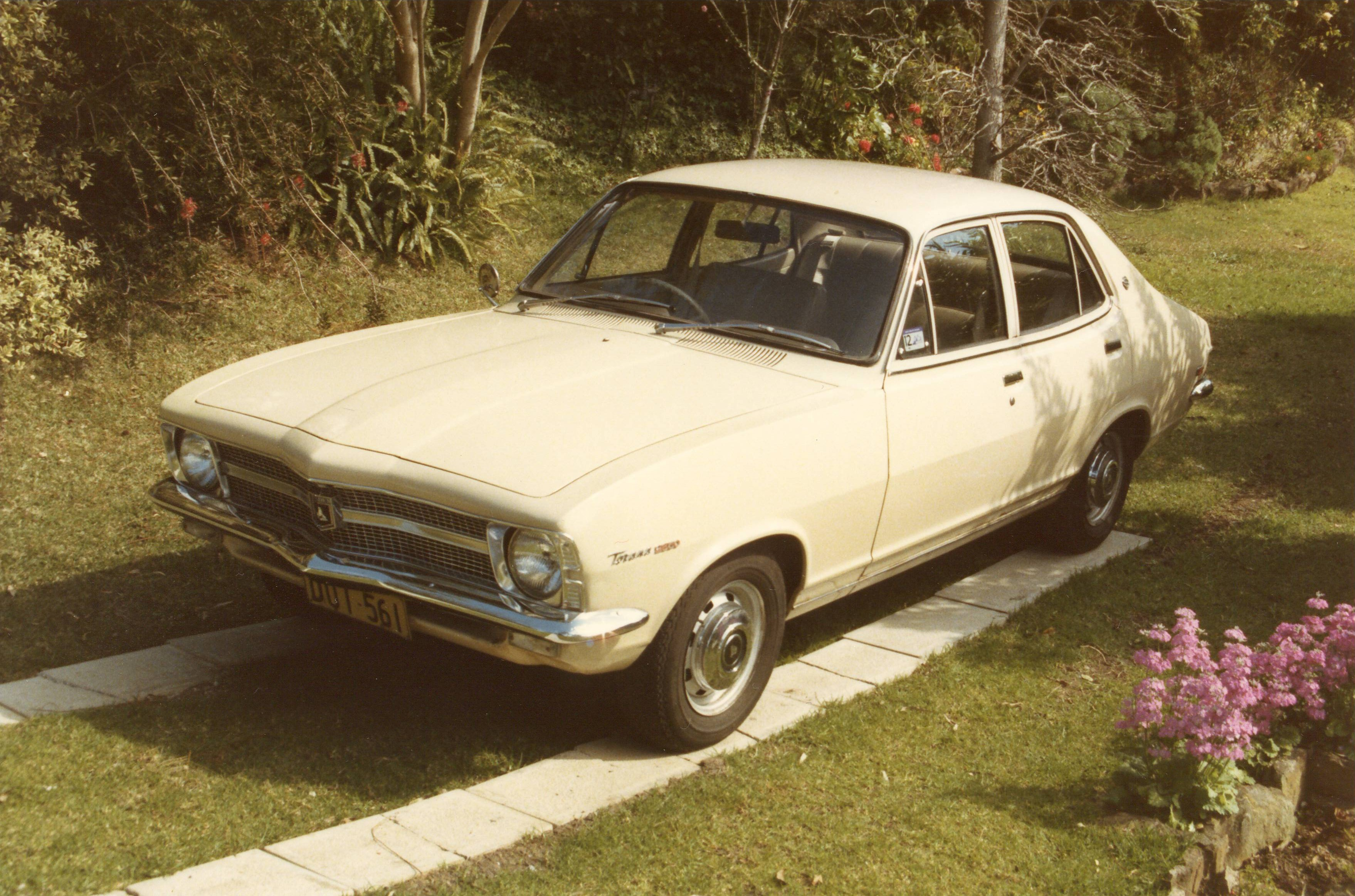
Holden LC Torana S 2600 4-door

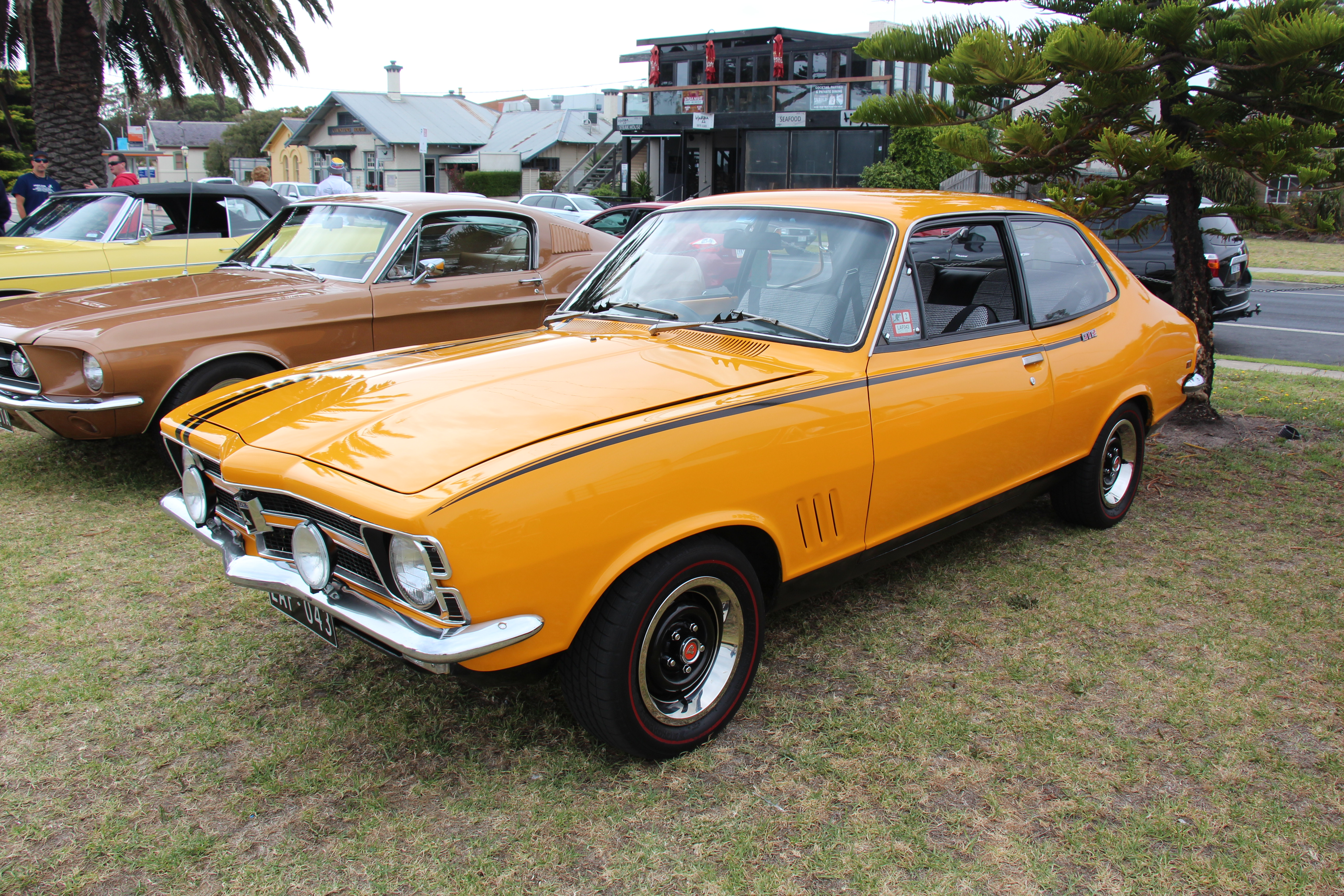
Holden LC Torana GTR

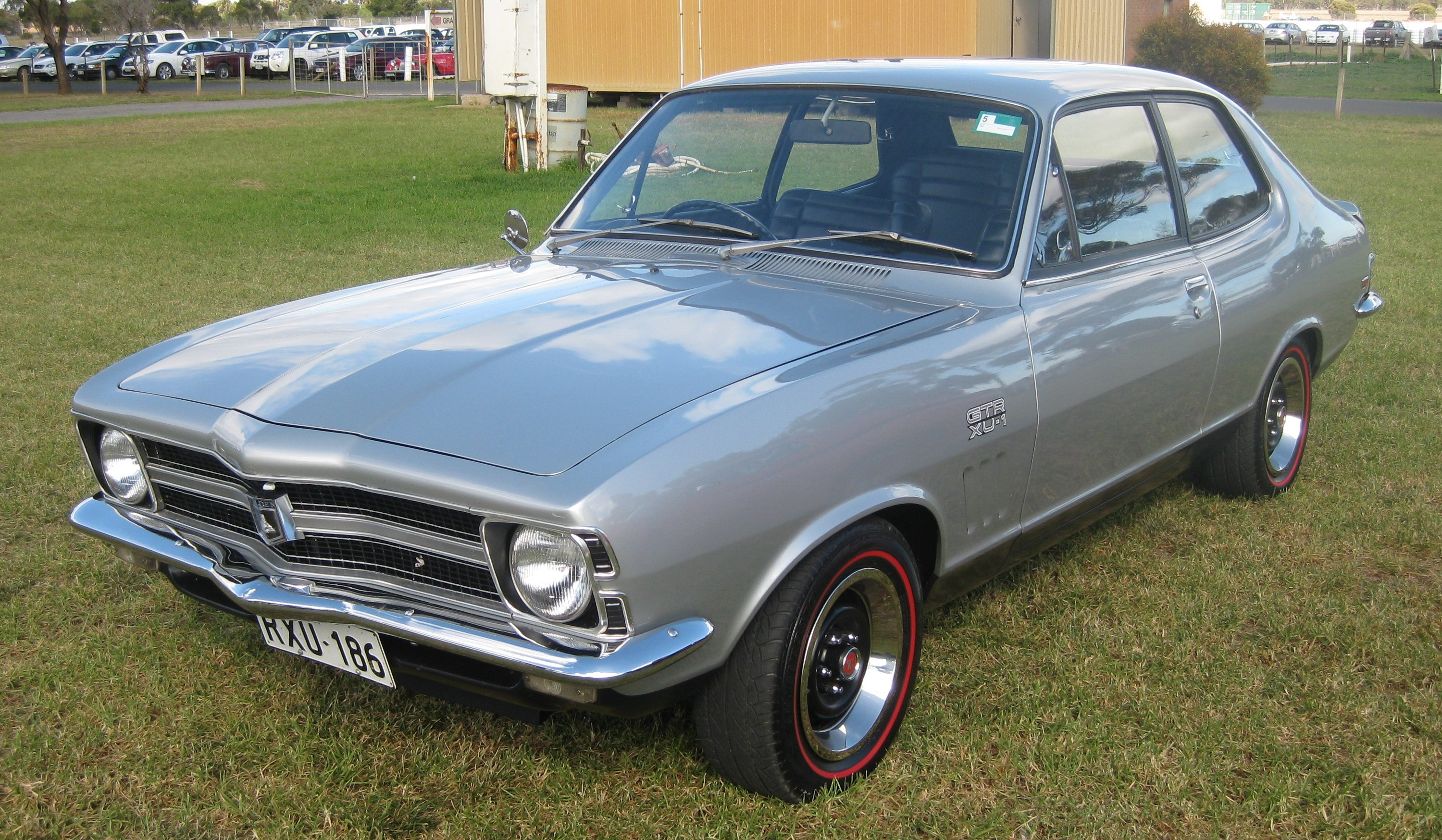
Holden LC Torana GTR XU-1

=== LJ ===
LJ
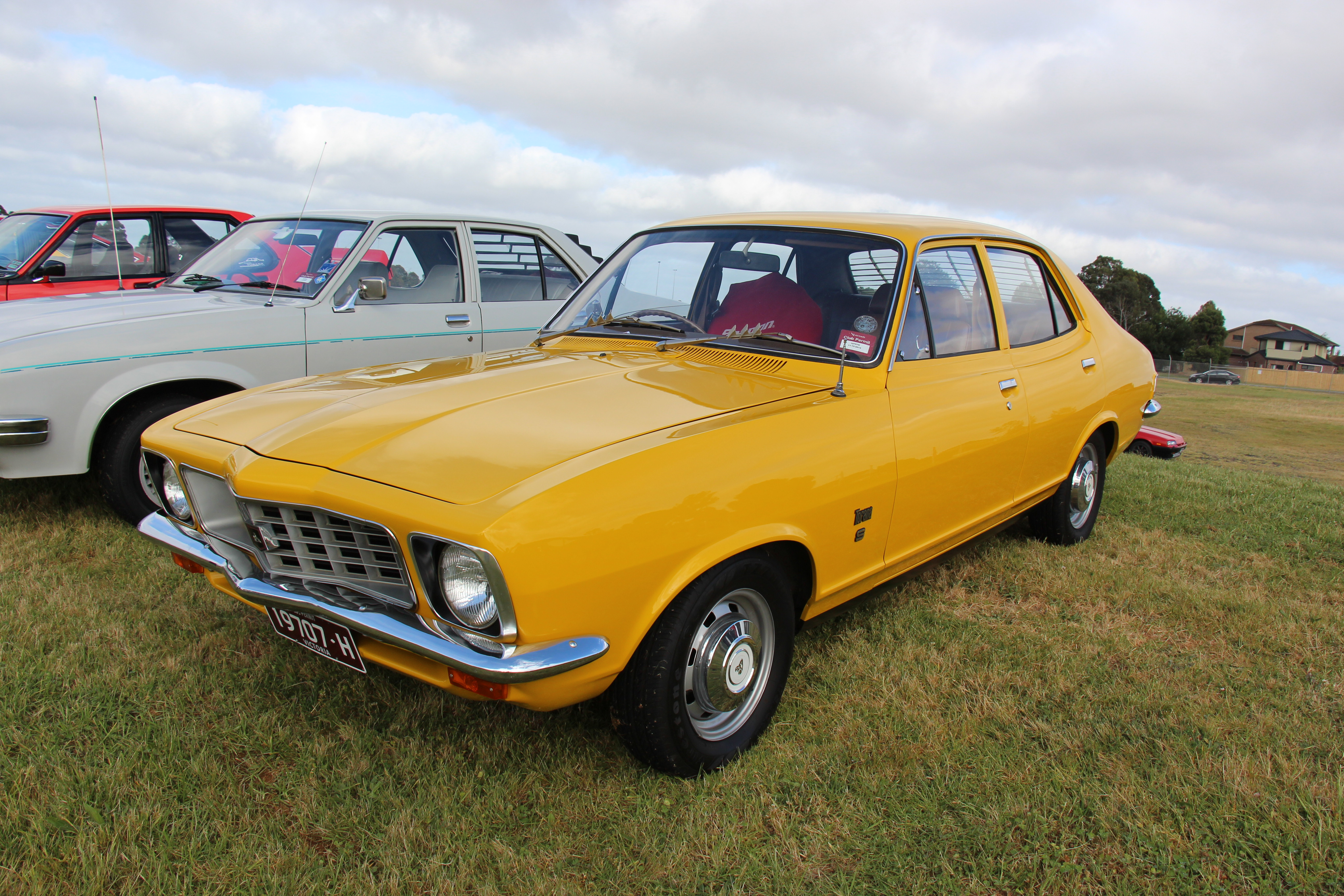
- Holden LJ Torana 6 S 4-door

Overview
- Also called: Chevrolet 1700 (South Korea); Saehan Camina (South Korea)
- Production: 1972–1974
- Designer: Leo Pruneau

Body and chassis
- Body style: 2-door sedan 4-door sedan

Powertrain
- Engine: 1.2 L OHV I4; 1.3 L OHV I4; 1.6 L OHC I4 (1972 only); 1.8 L OHC I4 (late 1972–1974); 138 cu in / 2.25 L OHV I6; 173 cu in/ 2.85 L OHV I6; 202 cu in / 3.3 L OHV I6

In February 1972, the facelifted LJ Torana was introduced with the six-cylinder models more visually associated with the larger Holden HQ series. Many mechanical components were carried over from the LC-series, with some changes to the choice of engines. The four-cylinder Torana retained its Vauxhall designed 1200OHV and 1600OHC engines, but was now also available with a 1300cc OHV unit. The base two-door car was now simply called the Torana 1200, while the 1300 engine equipped the Torana Deluxe model in either two-door or four-door form. The optional 1600 OHC engine was later in the year to be increased in capacity, badged as the 1760 OHC. Otherwise, the 2250 and 2850 engines carried over into the revised six-cylinder Torana models, and the 3300 engine (known as the 202 in the HQ range) was adopted as the engine for the LJ Torana GTR sedan. Gearbox choices remained the same across the range.

A race-bred version of the 3300 engine was also fitted to the LJ Torana GTR XU-1, producing 190 bhp (142 kW; 193 PS). The XU-1 was also equipped with larger CD-175 Zenith-Stromberg triple carburettors, as well as a new close-ratio four-speed Australian-made transmission (which was not available as an option on the standard GTR). Also available on the 'Bathurst Special' was an even closer-ratio gearbox and the taller (reduced from 3.36:1 to 3.08:1) rear axle final drive ratio from the standard GTR which increased top speed to 135 mph (217 km/h). This gave the nimble XU-1 the power boost it needed to seriously challenge the powerful Ford Falcon GTHO Phase III, which had won the 1971 Hardie-Ferodo 500 production-car endurance race held annually at Bathurst.

In the wet conditions of the 1972 Hardie-Ferodo 500, the lightweight HDT Torana GTR XU-1 was able to finally claim victory against the Ford GTHO, the XU-1 driven solo for 500 miles (800 km) by Peter Brock. This would be the start of the 'Peter Perfect'/Torana legend, and the first of five Bathurst wins for the Torana in its 10-year racing career at Bathurst.

The Holden Dealer Team also developed a 300 bhp (224 kW; 304 PS), 308ci V8-powered version of the GTR XU-1, often referred to as The Beast. The V8 Torana did race in Sports Sedan racing in the hands of Brock and Colin Bond, and was extensively road tested by HDT boss Harry Firth and young team engineer/driver Larry Perkins, but the car never made it past the prototype stage. This was due to the 'supercar scare' of 1972, which involved vast political pressure being placed upon Holden, Ford, and Chrysler to abandon their proposed specially built 'Bathurst Supercars', such as the V8 GTR XU-1. This was the result of some media reporting concerns about the public having access to such high powered cars. In effect, all three manufacturers (Holden, Ford and Chrysler) bowed to this pressure, and Holden postponed its introduction of a V8 Torana for two years until the release of the larger LH series Torana in 1974.

A total of 81,813 LJ Toranas were built by Holden in Australia, with some exported to New Zealand, but only in six-cylinder form, as the similar 130OHV and 1760OHV four-cylinder Vauxhall Viva HC range was also sold there. The 2850S model, with bucket seats and four-speed floor shift or console shift Trimatic three-speed automatic, was also shipped to New Zealand in CKD kit form for local assembly from 1973, becoming the first Kiwi-built Torana.

==== South Korea ====
In South Korea the LJ Torana was built and sold by GM Korea as the Chevrolet 1700, with the exception of the wagon, from CKD kits supplied directly by Holden Australia between September 1972 and 1976. Unlike the Torana, the 1700 was also available as a five-door station wagon. Powered by a 1698-cc four-cylinder engine used in the Opel Reckord B which GM Korea was also building and selling at the same time. The 1700 sold poorly on the Korean market with only 8105 units produced. The main deterrent to sales was the high government taxes imposed by the government in relation to this class of vehicle - the automobile taxation system of South Korea greatly favours engines of less than 1.5 litres displacement. The car was also perceived to suffer from high fuel consumption, while the suspension was seen as unsuitable for Korean roads.

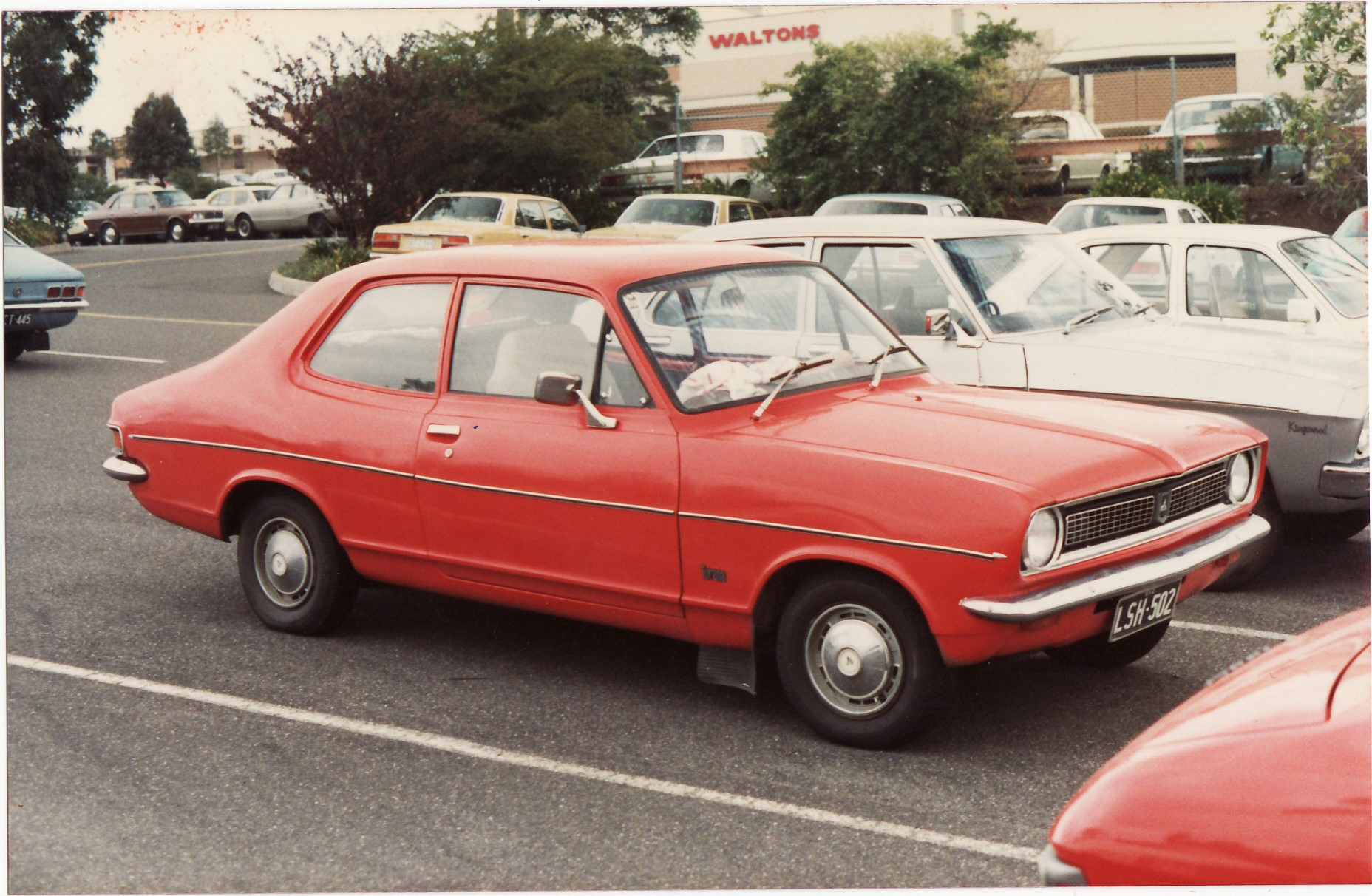
Holden LJ Torana 4 2-door

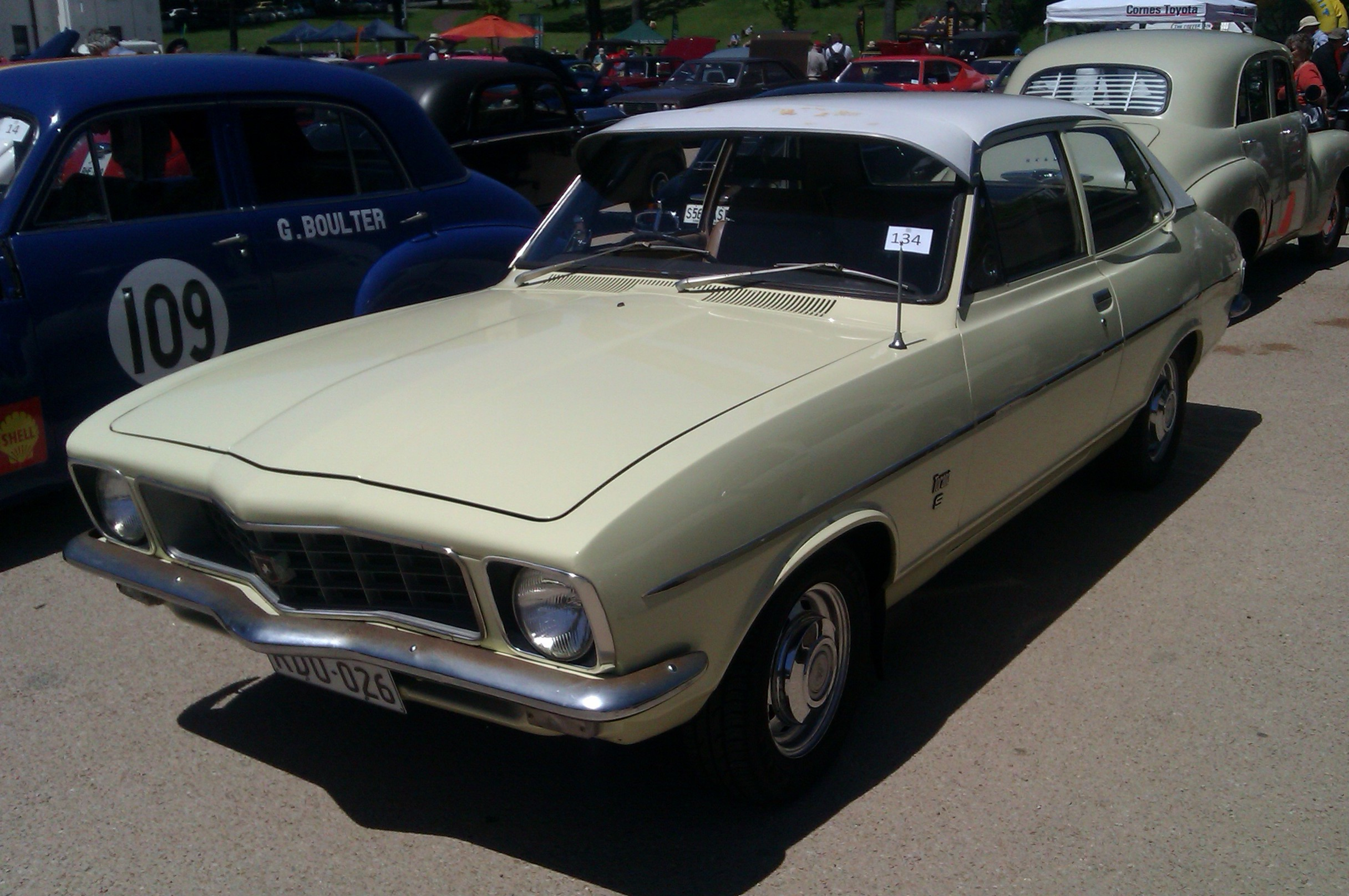
Holden LJ Torana 6 S 2-door

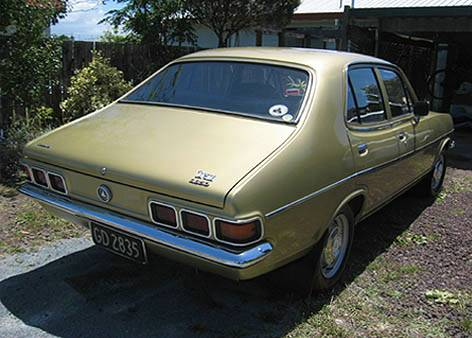
Holden LJ Torana 6 S 4-door

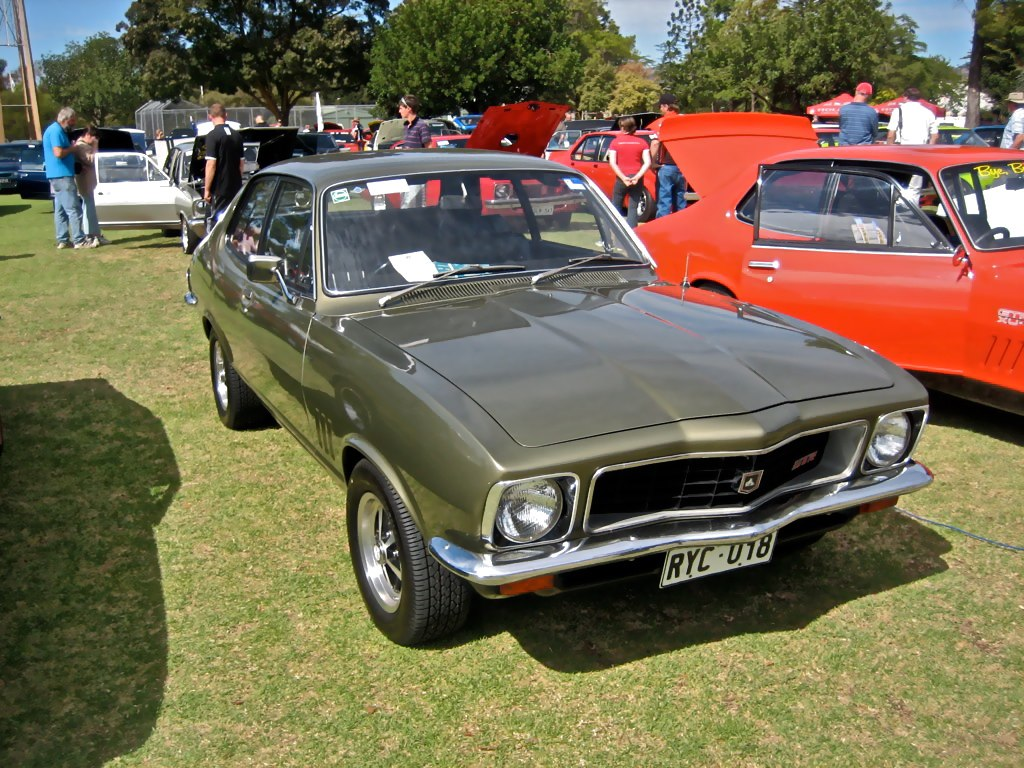
Holden LJ Torana GTR

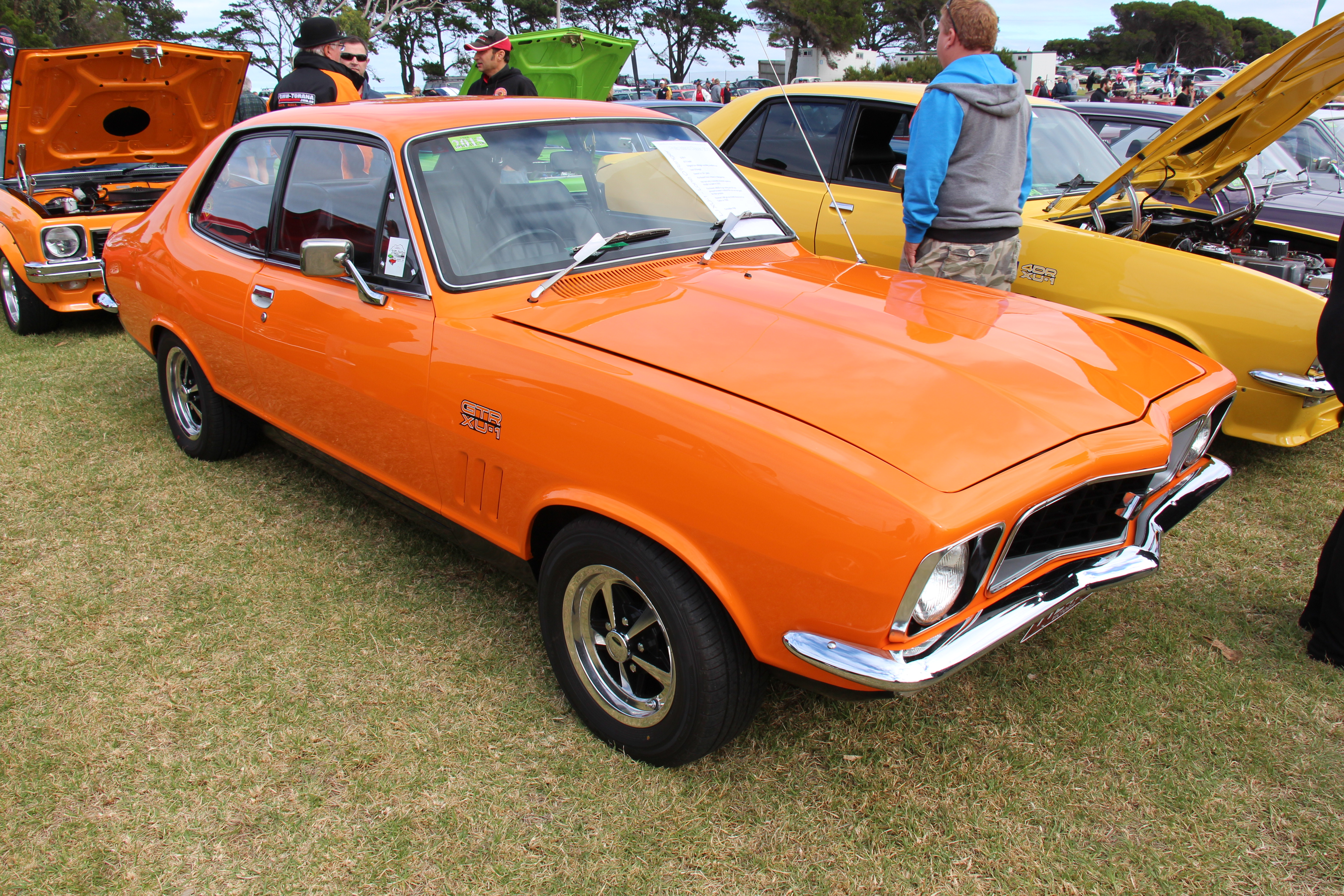
Holden LJ Torana GTR XU-1

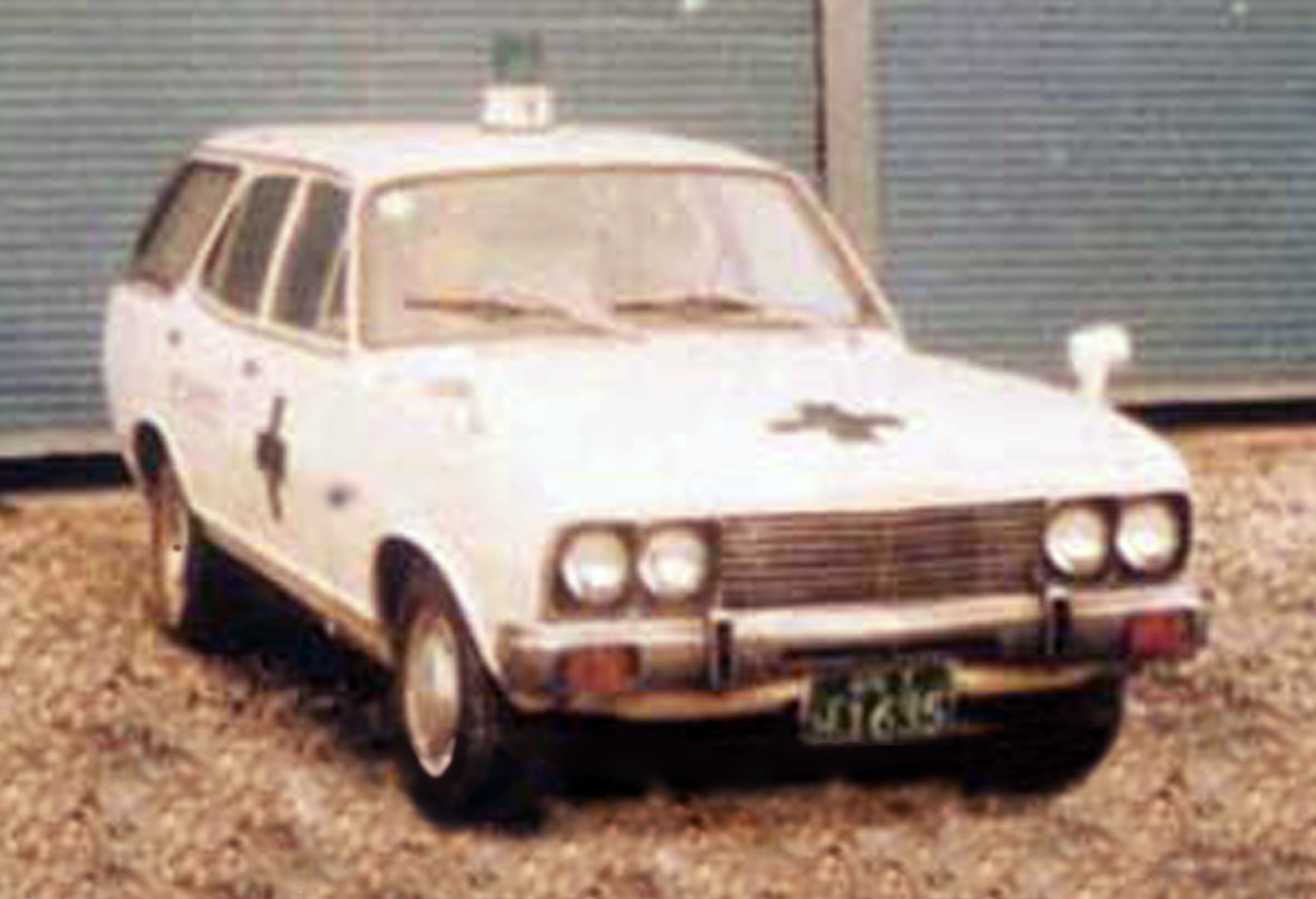
Saehan Caravan ambulance

=== TA ===
TA
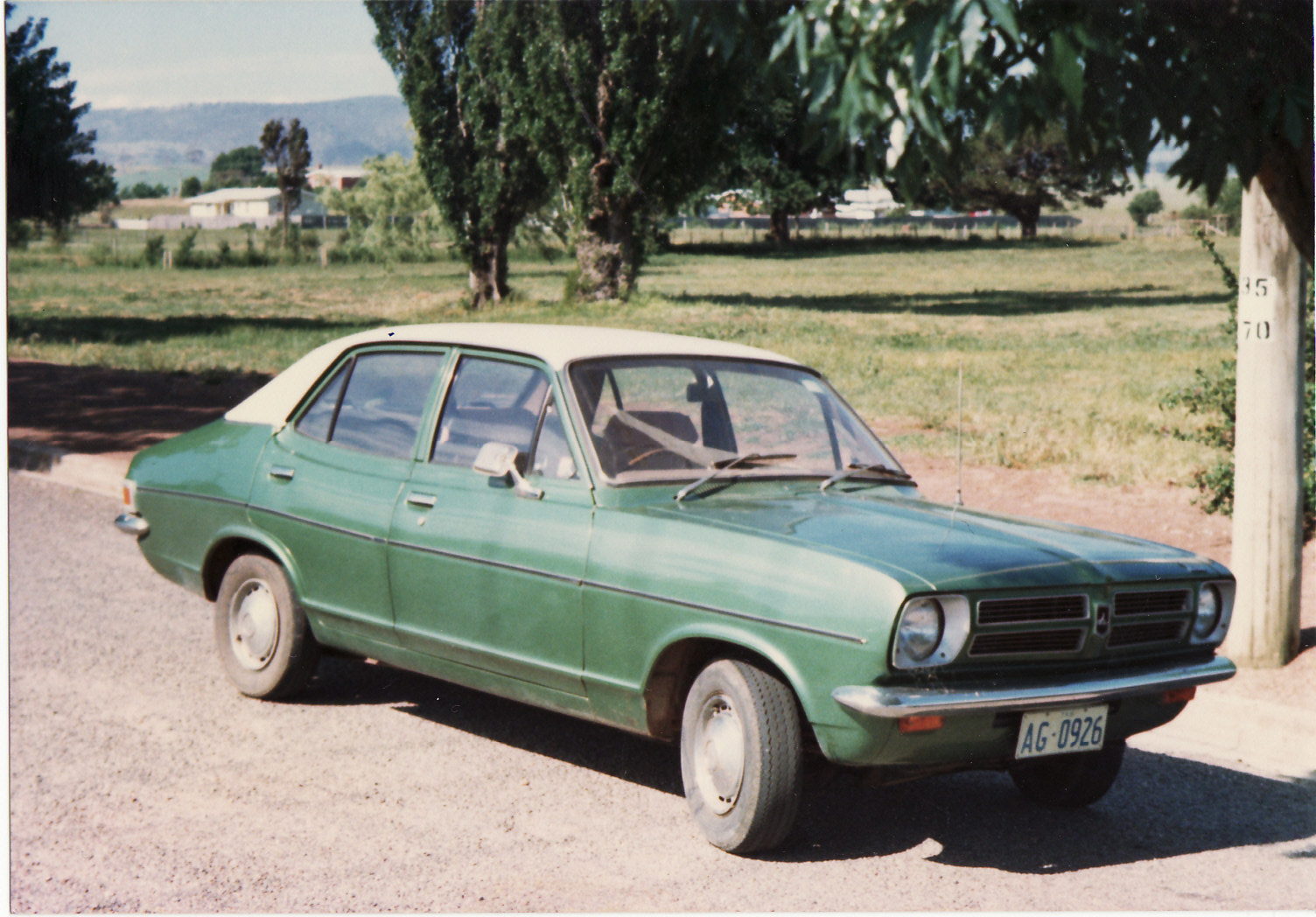

Overview
- Production: 1974–1975

Body and chassis
- Body style: 2-door sedan 4-door sedan

Powertrain
- Engine: 1.3 L OHV I4; 1.8 L OHC I4

In 1974, the six-cylinder LJ Torana was replaced by the new mid-sized body six- and eight-cylinder LH Torana series. To fill the gap before the March 1975 release of the four-cylinder GM world T-car Holden Gemini, the short-wheelbase four-cylinder (1.3- and 1.8-litre) LJ models were given a basic facelift incorporating a body-colour plastic-moulded front grille assembly and revamped rear light lenses. This car was released in February 1974 on the Australian market only, in both two- and four-door forms, as the TA Torana. It was only produced for 11 months with a total production run of 11,304 units.

== Third generation ==
=== LH ===
LH
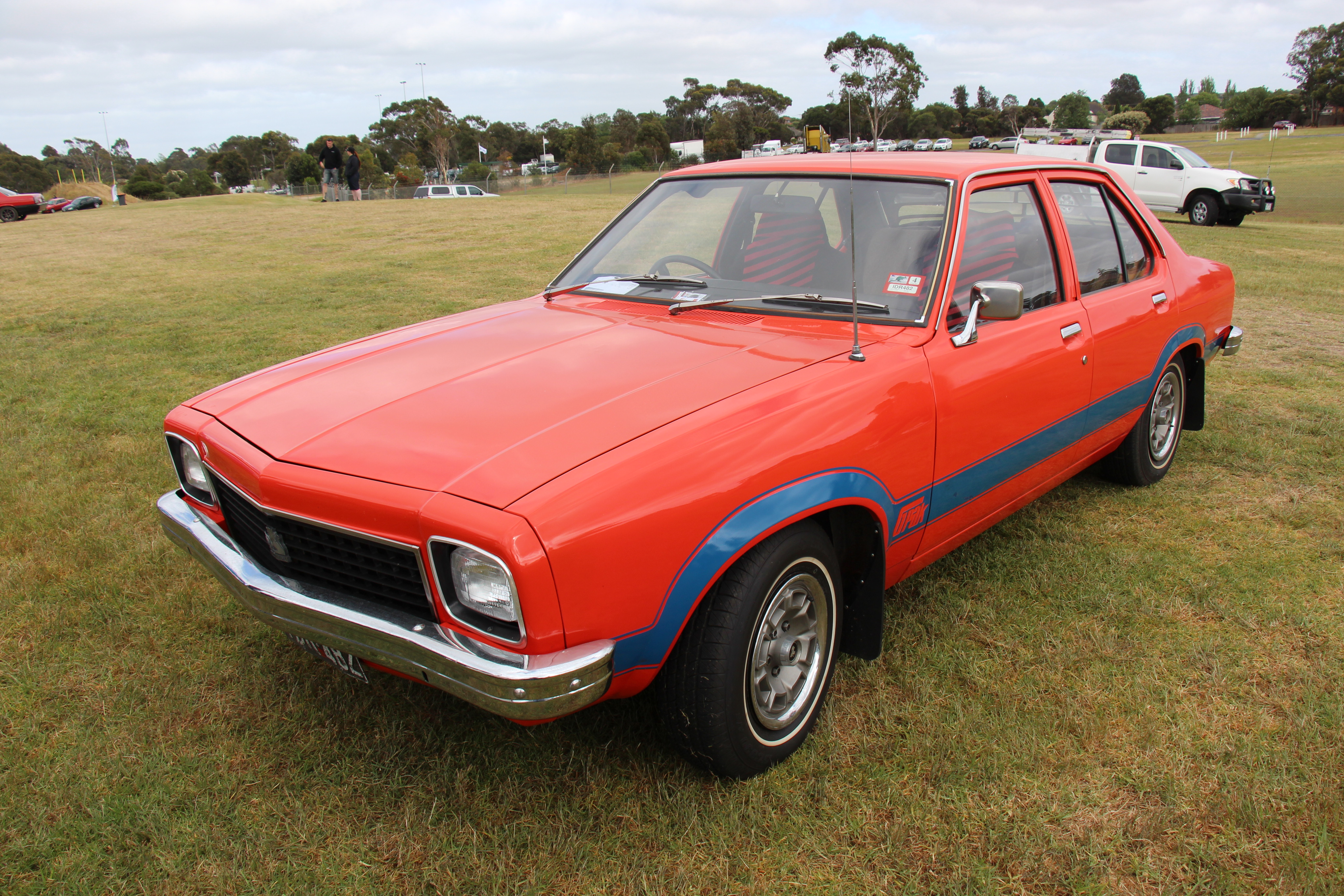
- Holden LH Torana G-Pak

Overview
- Production: 1974–1976
- Designer: Joe Schemansky, Leo Pruneau

Body and chassis
- Body style: 4-door sedan

Powertrain
- Engine: 1897 cc Opel CIH I4; 138 cu in (2,262 cc) GMH 2250 OHV I6 (Export); 173 cu in (2,835 cc) GMH 2850 OHV I6; 201 cu in (3,298 cc) GMH 3300 OHV I6; 253 cu in (4,143 cc) GMH 253 OHV V8; 308 cu in (5,044 cc) GMH 308 OHV V8

Dimensions
- Wheelbase: 2,590 mm (101.8 in)
- Length: 4,510 mm (177.5 in)
- Width: 1,704 mm (67.1 in)
- Height: 1,331 mm (52.4 in)

March 1974 had the first completely new Torana body, with the arrival of the larger mid-sized LH series, produced in four-door sedan style only. It resembled other GM products of its generation, notably the Opel Rekord D and particularly in overall size and profile, the closely related FE series Vauxhall Victor. It was unique in that, following the addition of a four-cylinder option in May 1974, the same body style was available with a choice of inline-four, inline-six, or V8 engines, specifically, 1.9-litre Opel four, 2.85- and 3.3-litre Holden 'red' sixes, and 4.2- and 5.0-litre Holden V8s. Low-compression versions of the fours and sixes were also available for export markets.

Exports were made to the Philippines, where the Torana 1900 was sold as the "Holden 1900".

The 5.0-litre engine was reserved for the sporting LH Torana SL/R 5000 sedan. A special build derivative of the SL/R 5000 was the Bathurst-intended 'L34 Option', of which only 263 were built, with a higher-compression engine with stouter components for more power and durability in competition use. The most notable external feature of the L34 was the bolt-on wheel arch extensions, designed to accommodate the larger racing rims and tyres.

According to Holden, the top speed of the SL/R 5000 was 208 km/h (129 mph).

The L34 option, which was first seen in 1975, proved to be fast and successful, yet fragile, in Australian touring car racing. It was eventually superseded by the evolutionary A9X option made available in the LX Torana series in 1977. The A9X road car was delivered with a standard L31 5.0 V8 (detuned to comply with emissions laws), but used the L34 motor in races which was developed by Repco for the LH SL/R 5000 H.O. L34. The A9X version of the Torana had a larger 10-bolt Salisbury differential with disc brakes and had the option of the Borg Warner Super T10 four-speed. Hardly any cars were delivered with Super T10 option, so in effect the immortalized A9X was a pretty stock car with a better differential and suspension. The LH Torana in L34 form won the Bathurst 1000 touring car race with Peter Brock and Brian Sampson in 1975 and with Bob Morris and John Fitzpatrick in 1976, with the L34 motor being fitted to the A9X, so in effect winning with that car, as well.

Retailing at some AU$2194 more than the standard LH SL/R 5000, the L34 option was never actually advertised for public sale and all applications to buy one had to be referred to a GM-H zone manager who would then decide if the applicant was a suitable buyer. This quickly led to a rumour that Holden had secretly done a deal with the Confederation of Australian Motorsport (CAMS) and the Australian Government to not sell any of the available race-like L34's to anyone who did not have a then current CAMS competition licence. To test whether this was true or not, Wheels magazine sent one of their journalists to four different Holden dealers across Sydney. Despite receiving various answers as to the availability of an L34 Torana, what was found was that the rumour had indeed been true. Holden dealers across Australia were not permitted to sell an L34 to anyone who did not have a current CAMS racing licence.

According to Holden Dealer Team boss Harry Firth, Holden chose to have the V8 engine in the SL/R 5000 developed by Repco on their dyno which led to massive oil surge problems on the race track and had a number of teams, including the HDT, suffer numerous engine failures in both testing and races in 1974. Firth believed that using the same V8 engine he had developed for the stillborn V8 GTR XU-1 would have solved this problem, as the HDT had already cured the oil problems, but Holden ignored his warnings.

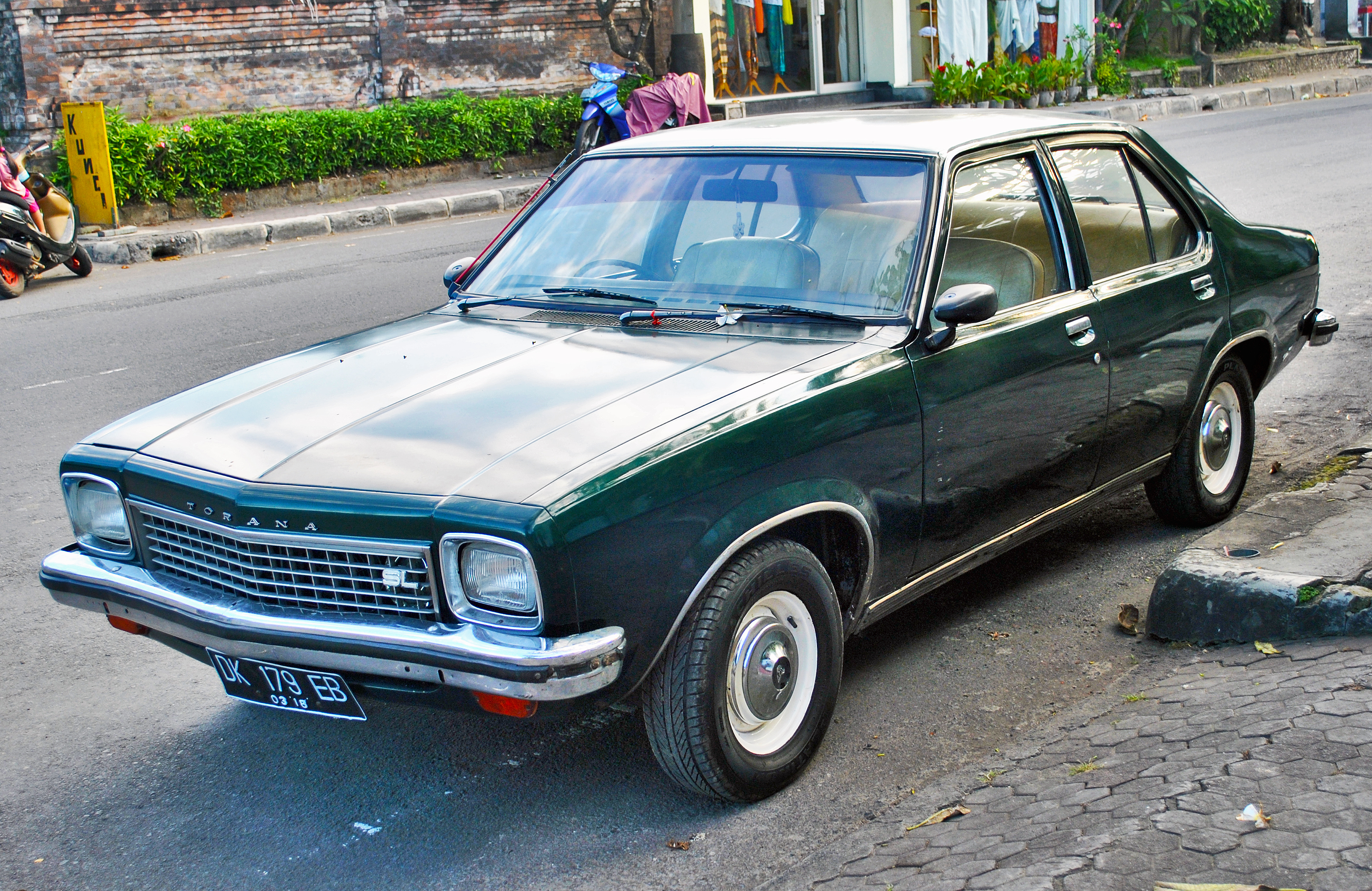
Holden LH Torana SL (Indonesia)

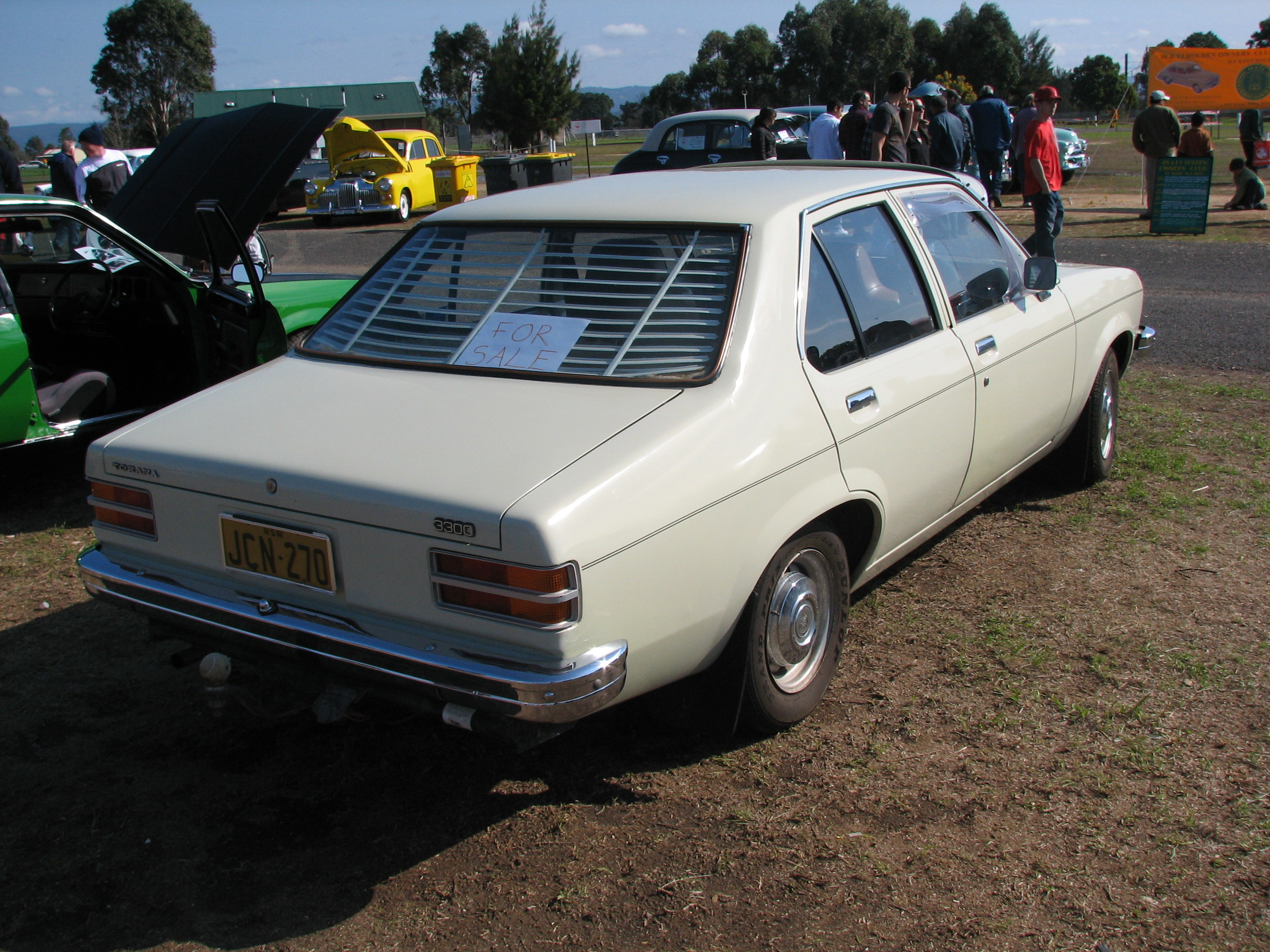
Holden LH Torana SL (Australia)

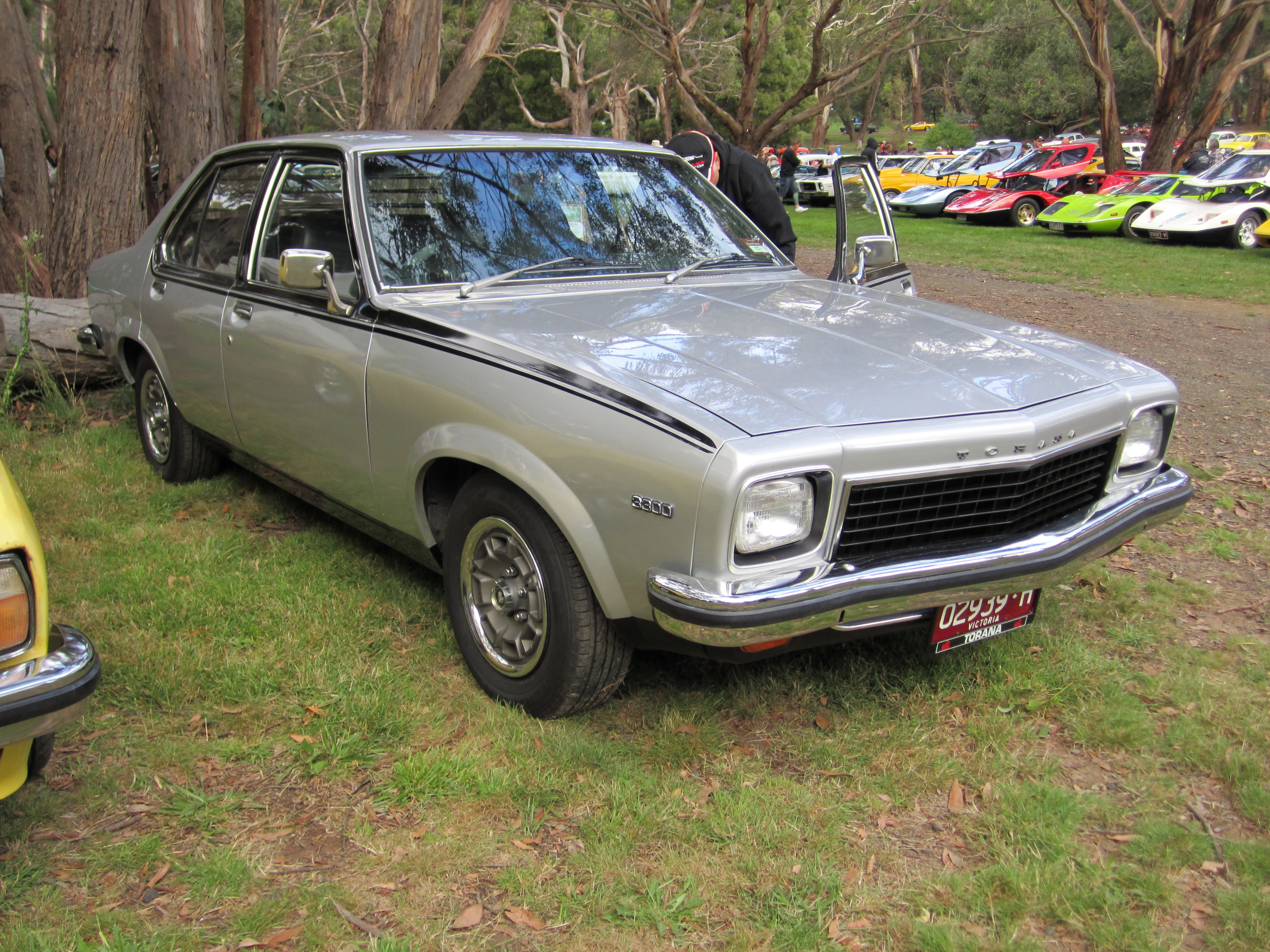
Holden LH Torana SL/R 3.3

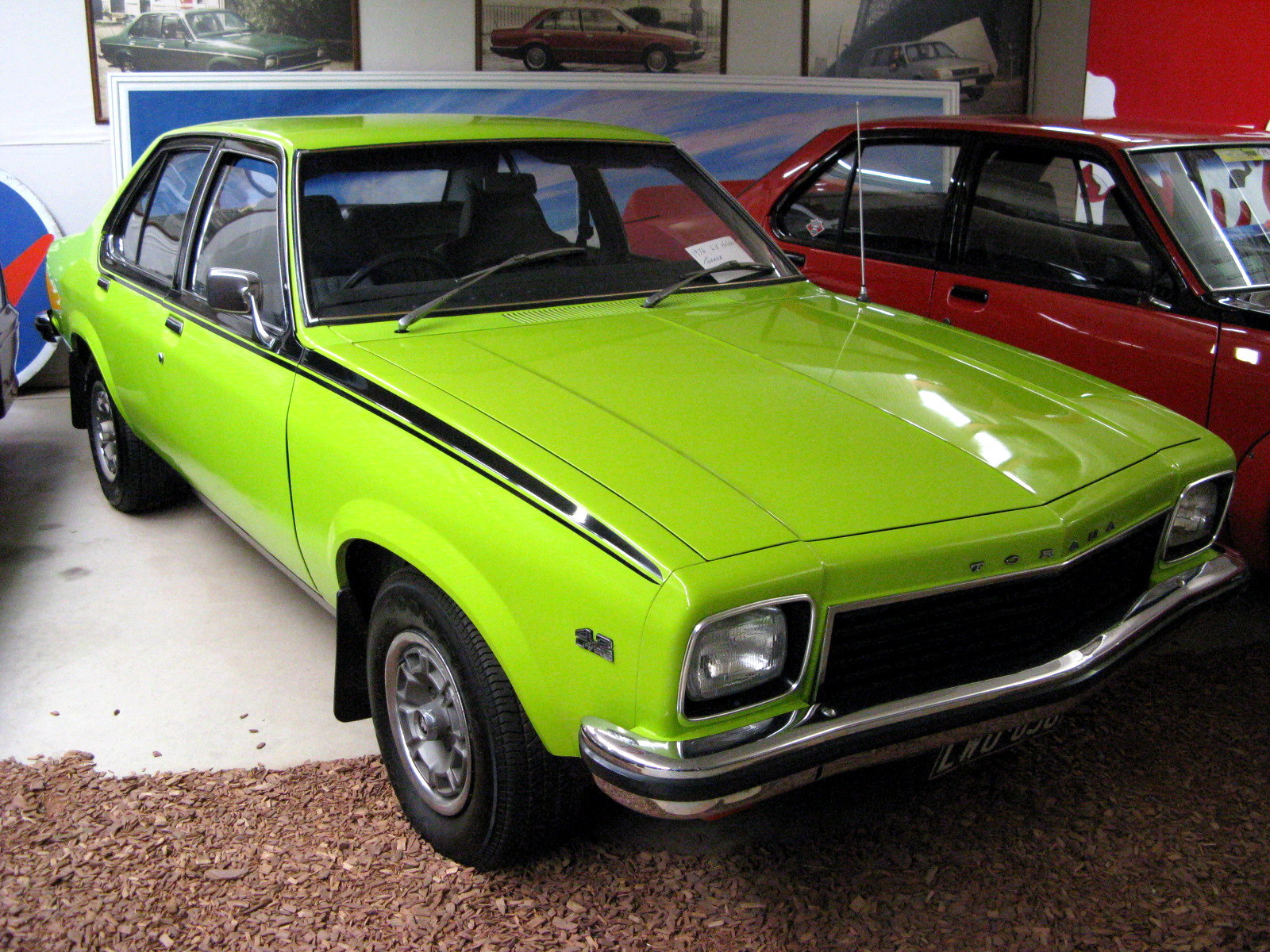
Holden LH Torana SL/R 4.2

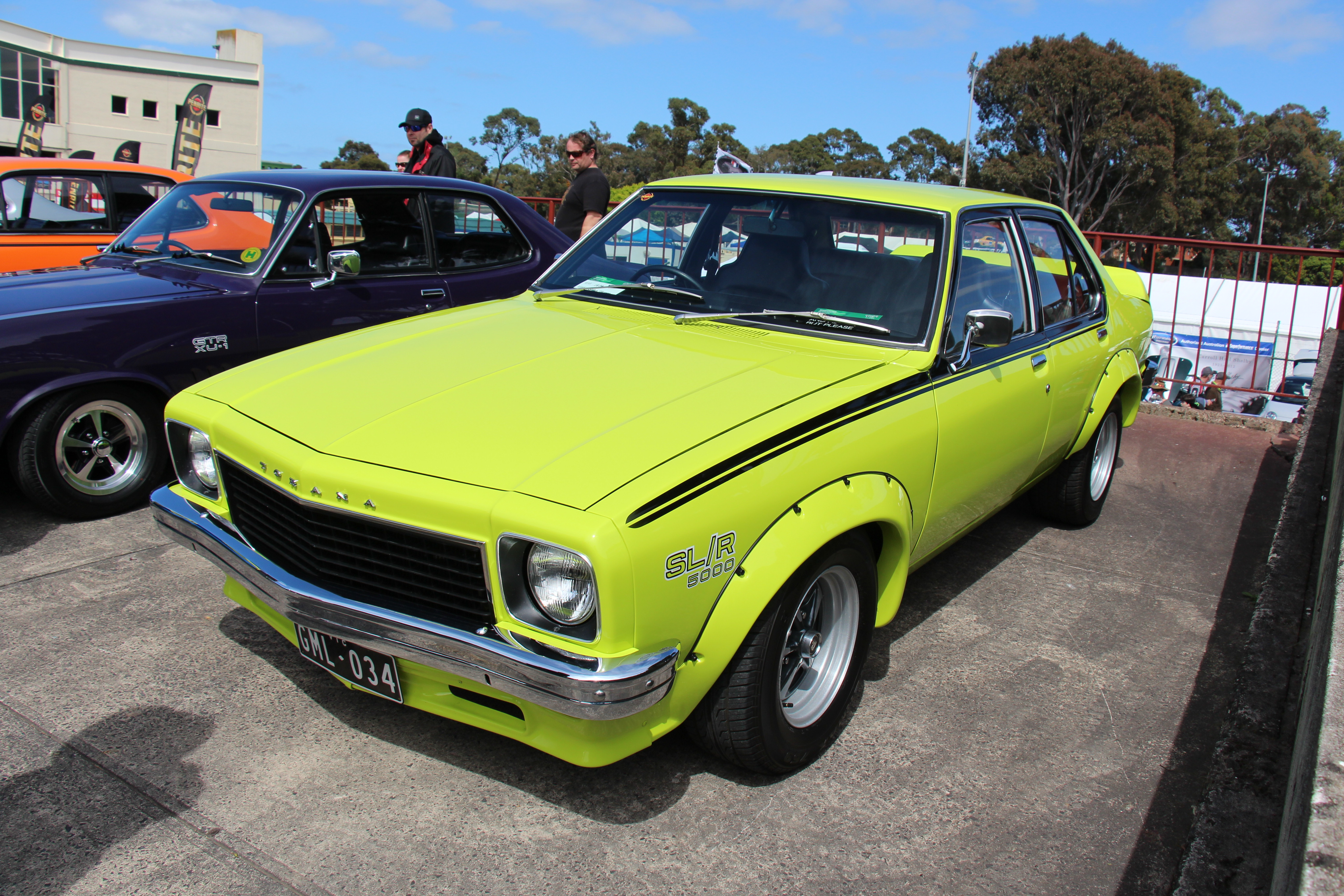
Holden LH Torana SL/R 5000 with L34 option

Prototype wagon and hatchback versions of the LH Torana were built, but never reached production. Overall, a total of 70,184 LH Toranas were built. A few special models of the LH were built, the somewhat sporting Plus 4 and G-Pak models. The Plus 4 arrived in September 1974 and was an attempt to move a few more of the slow-selling four-cylinder models. The G-Pak, first seen in February 1975, received the 3.3-litre inline-six. Both came with a four-speed manual, sporting instrumentation, and disc brakes in front.

New Zealand assembly got off to a troubled start. General Motors New Zealand, which still had a wide four-cylinder Vauxhall Viva/Magnum line on sale, had planned a 2850 six 'S' model with bench front seat and three-speed column manual shift and the 3300SL with bucket seats and four-speed manual or three-speed Trimatic floor shift. The New Zealand government, though, imposed a 60% sales tax (a post-first oil crisis measure) on cars with engines over 2.7 litres just as GM launched the LH in mid-'74, and only a few of each were built. The LH was then withdrawn temporarily and relaunched some months later with the Opel 1.9-litre I4 and floor-shift manual or automatic (SL only) gearboxes. Six-cylinder Toranas would never again be built in New Zealand and were only very rare imports after this. GM New Zealand also built a local version of the Australian Plus 4 'sports' special edition, but the changes were only cosmetic - bright paint colours, special wheel trims, black stripes and all-black interior trim.

=== LX ===
LX
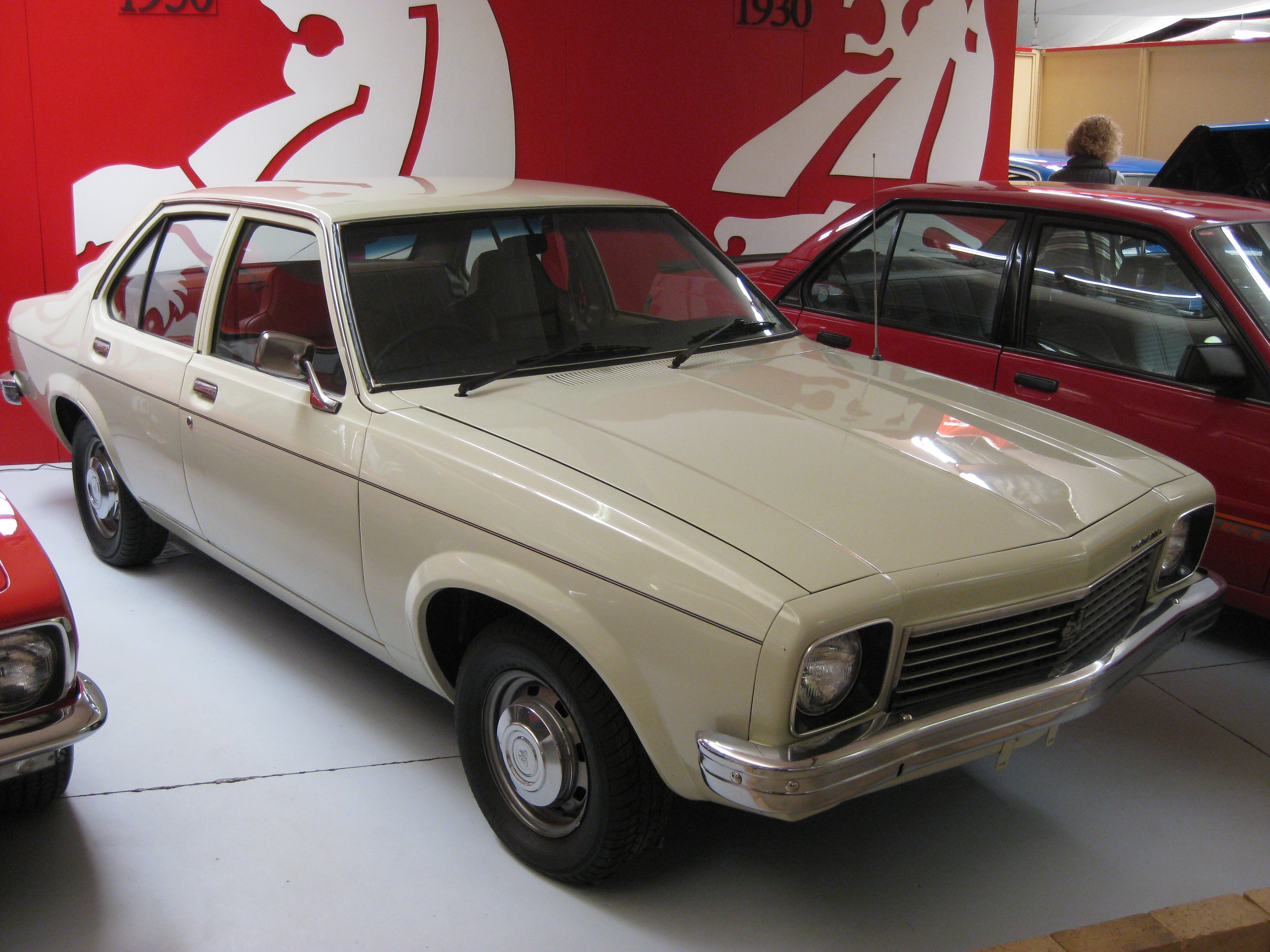
- Holden LX Torana S Sedan

Overview
- Also called: Holden LX Sunbird
- Production: 1976–1978
- Designer: Joe Schemansky, Leo Pruneau

Body and chassis
- Body style: 3-door hatchback 4-door sedan

Powertrain
- Engine: 1897 cc Opel CIH I4; 173 / 2.85 L OHV I6; 202 / 3.3L OHV I6; 253 / 4.2 L OHV V8; 308 / 5.0L OHV V8

The mildly facelifted LX series arrived in February 1976. Cosmetically, the most obvious changes were to replace the LH's rectangular headlights with round headlights, side window surrounds were changed from body colour to black, and the front Holden badge was enlarged. A two-door hatchback body was introduced as an alternative to the four-door sedan, although the 1,897-cc Opel unit was not offered in the new body style. Soon after its introduction, in July 1976 the LX was subjected to performance-reducing engine modifications to comply with new ADR27A emission regulations. Power outputs (from now on specified in kilowatts, as part of Australia's metrication programme) changed as:

- 173/2.85: from 118 hp (88 kW) to 58 kW (78 hp)
- 202/3.3: from 135 hp (101 kW) to 64 kW (86 hp)
- 253/4.2: from 185 hp (138 kW) to 83 kW (111 hp)
- 308/5.0: from 240 hp (179 kW) to 126 kW (169 hp)

==== LX Sunbird ====
When the LX Torana was introduced, it featured a choice of four-, six-, and eight-cylinder engines. In November 1976 the four-cylinder Torana was revised and relaunched as the Holden LX Sunbird. Reflecting the new emissions rules, power from the Opel-sourced engine was down from 76 to 72 kW (102 to 96 hp). From this point, all four-cylinder models were marketed as Sunbirds and the six- or eight-cylinder models as Toranas. The original LX series Sunbird was a single-trim range, with four-speed manual and three-speed automatic transmissions. There were minor trim differences compared to the Torana, notably the grille (with vertical bars) and distinctive chrome wheel covers. It was marketed as a four-door sedan and as a three-door hatchback, unlike the short-lived four-cylinder LX Torana. The introduction of Sunbird also coincided with the first attempt by Holden to add a handling package to its range of cars. The introduction of 'radial-tuned suspension' (RTS) began with the LX Sunbird sedan and hatchback and then the LX Torana.

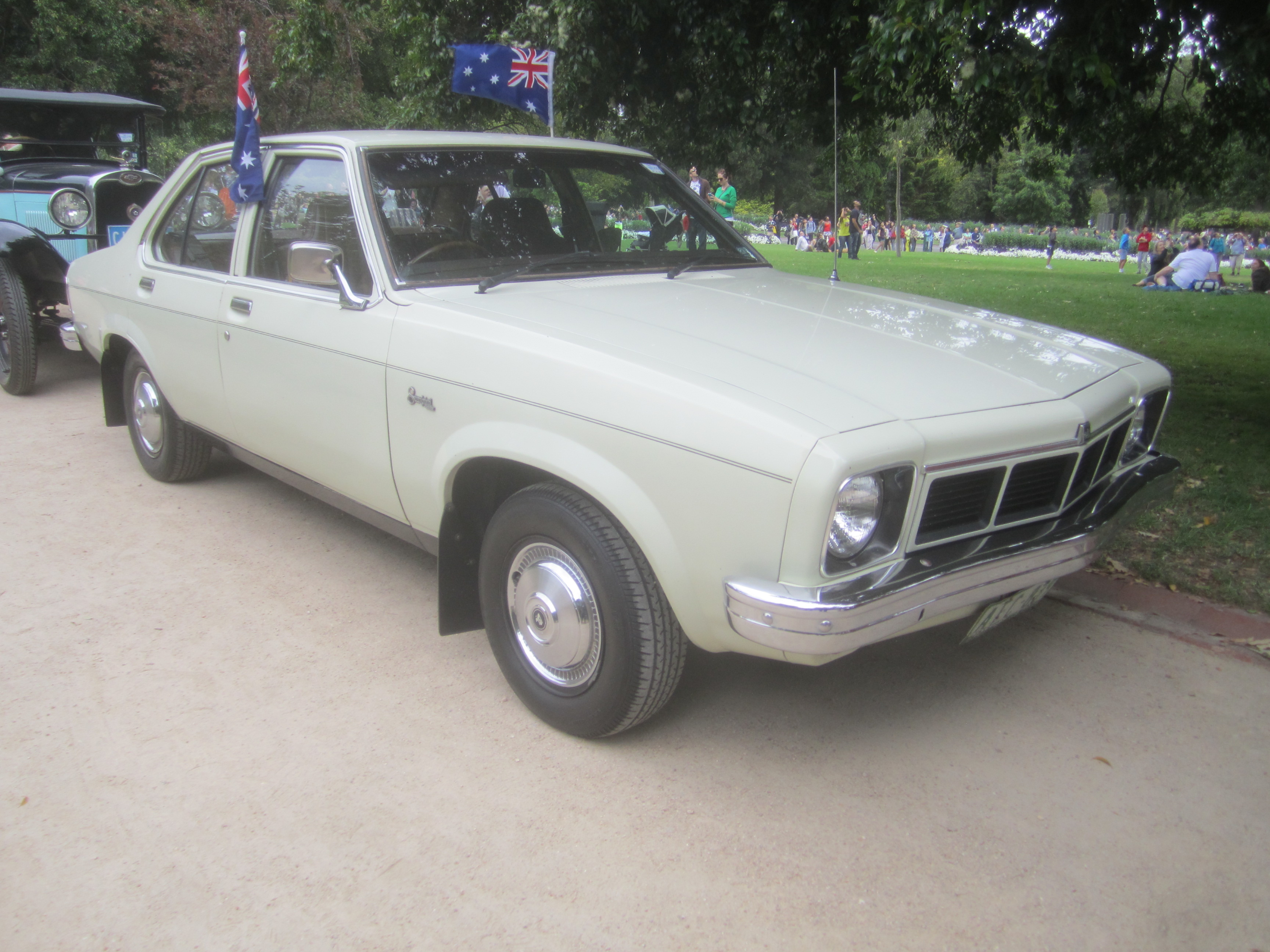
Holden LX Sunbird Sedan

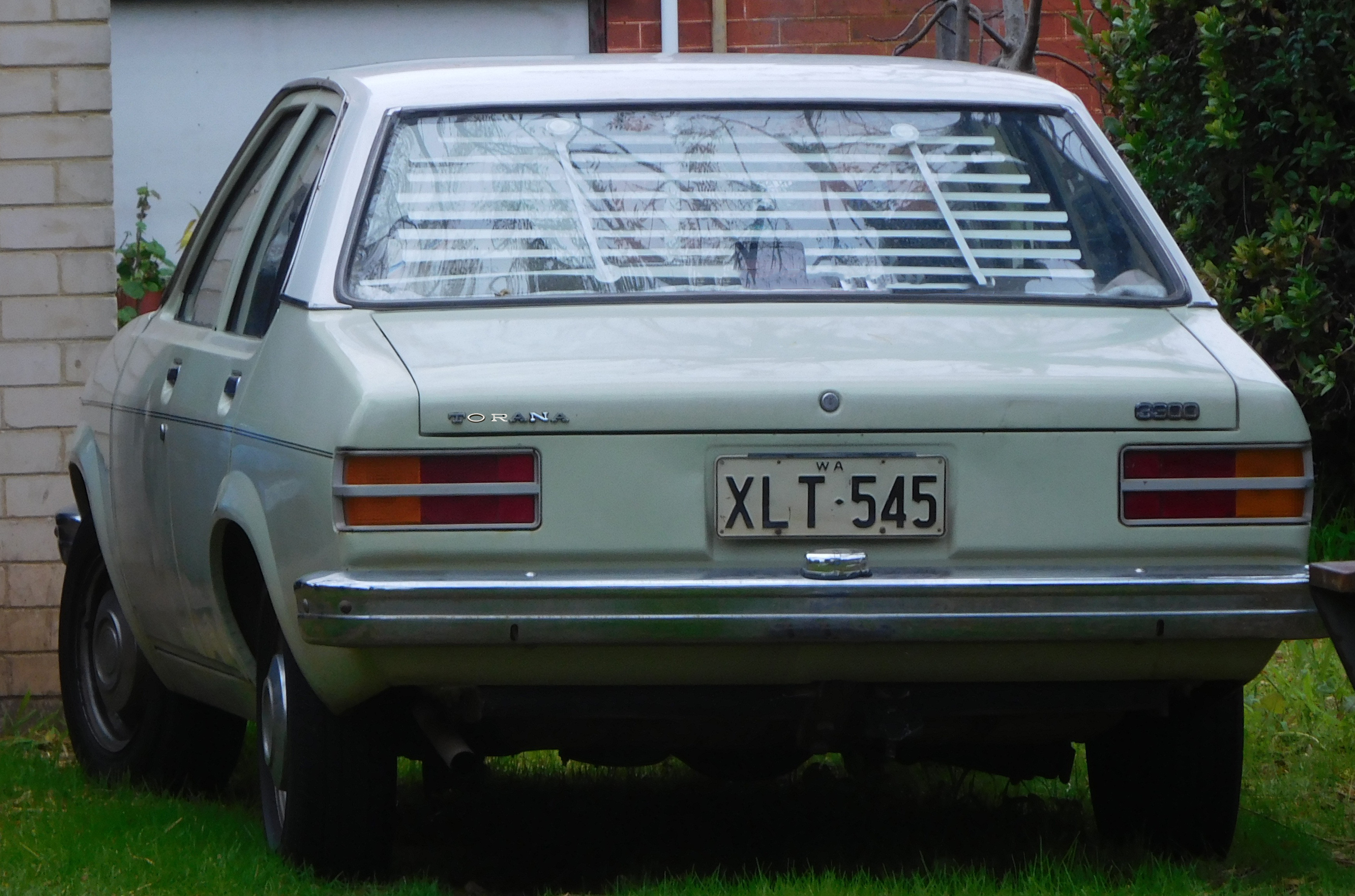
Holden LX Torana S Sedan

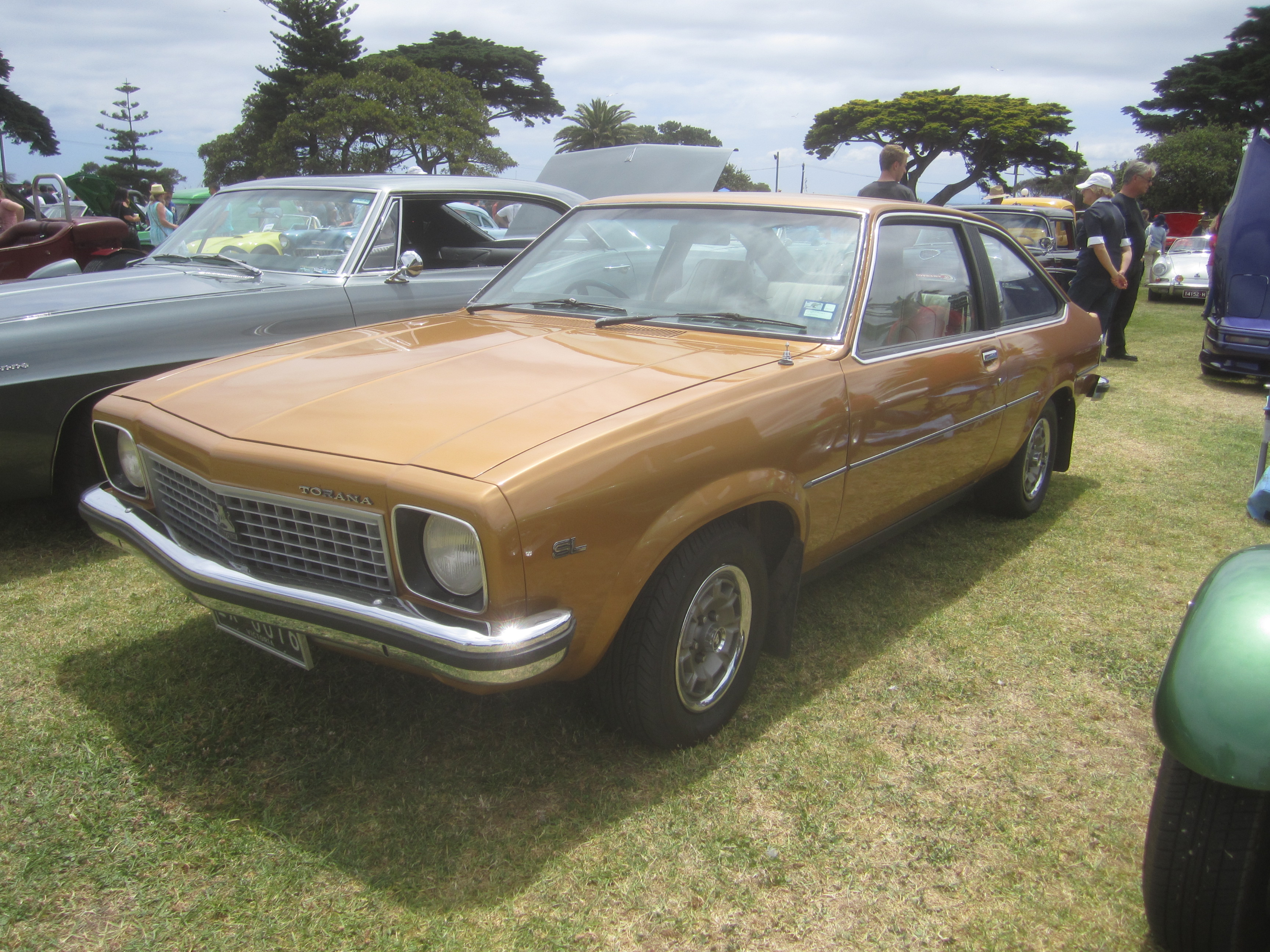
Holden LX Torana SL Hatchback

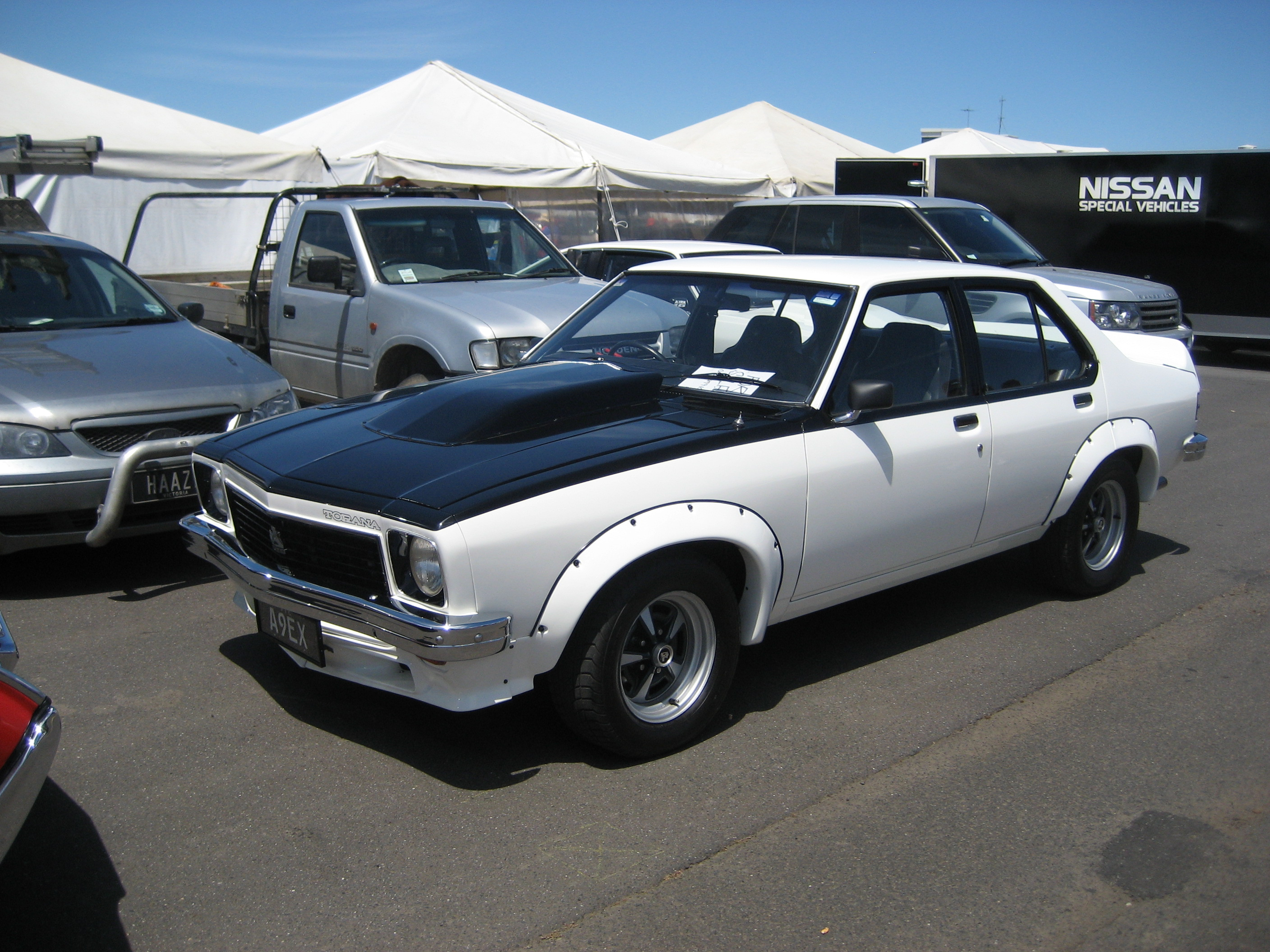
Holden LX Torana SL/R 5000 with A9X option

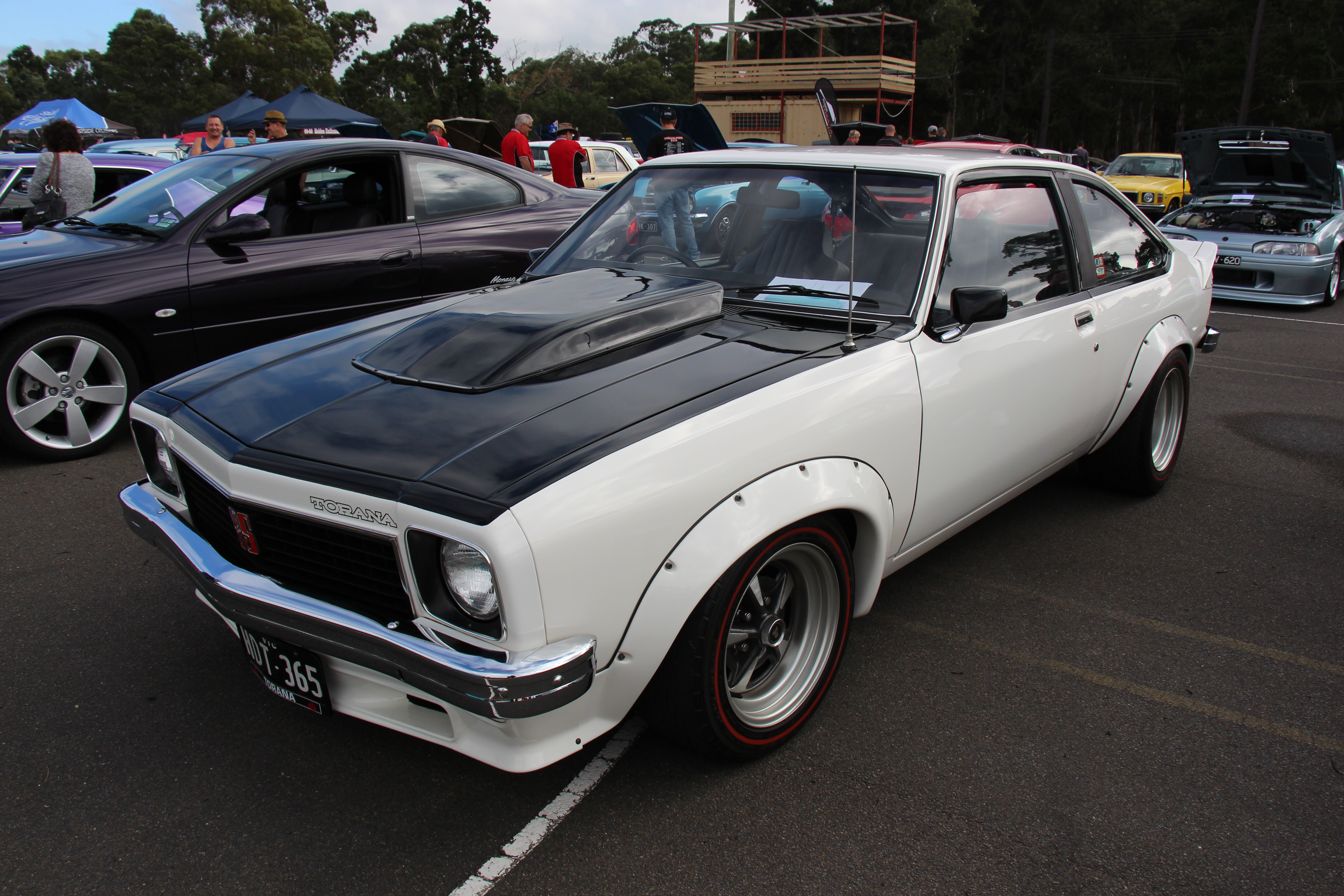
Holden LX Torana SS with A9X option

==== A9X option ====
During 1977, the LX series also had the development of another limited-build high-performance option aimed at winning in Australian Touring Car racing, and in particular at the annual Bathurst 1000 touring car race. This 'A9X Option' was available on the 5.0-litre V8-powered SLR 5000 sedan and SS hatchback models. The A9X visually resembled the L34-optioned LH model, but with the addition of a rear-facing bonnet scoop designed to increase airflow into the engine bay (carburettor) to produce maximum power in motor racing applications. The A9X package varied from the old L34 in road form in that whilst the engine was not modified, the A9X nevertheless had some special mechanical features such as rear disc brakes, heavy-duty axles, and a heavy-duty '10 bolt' differential.

After being rushed into Group C touring car racing, Peter Brock gave the A9X a dream debut by winning the 1977 Hang Ten 400 at Sandown. However, after he put his Torana on pole position, the A9X ultimately lost its debut Bathurst race in 1977 to the Ford Falcons of Allan Moffat and Colin Bond. The A9X package was soon refined and proved dominant during the following two seasons of touring-car racing in Australia. Drivers Peter Brock and Bob Morris were victorious in the 1978 and 1979 Australian Touring Car Championships, respectively, and A9Xs shared by Peter Brock and Jim Richards won the 1978 and 1979 Bathurst 1000s. In a show of the A9X's superiority, Brock and Richards won the 1979 race by a record six laps, with Brock setting the touring-car lap record on the last lap of the race.

Overall, a total of 65,977 LX Toranas were produced by Holden.

An A9X recently sold at auction for $500,000. In mid 2021 one was expected to fetch over $1,000,000 at auction.

=== UC ===
UC
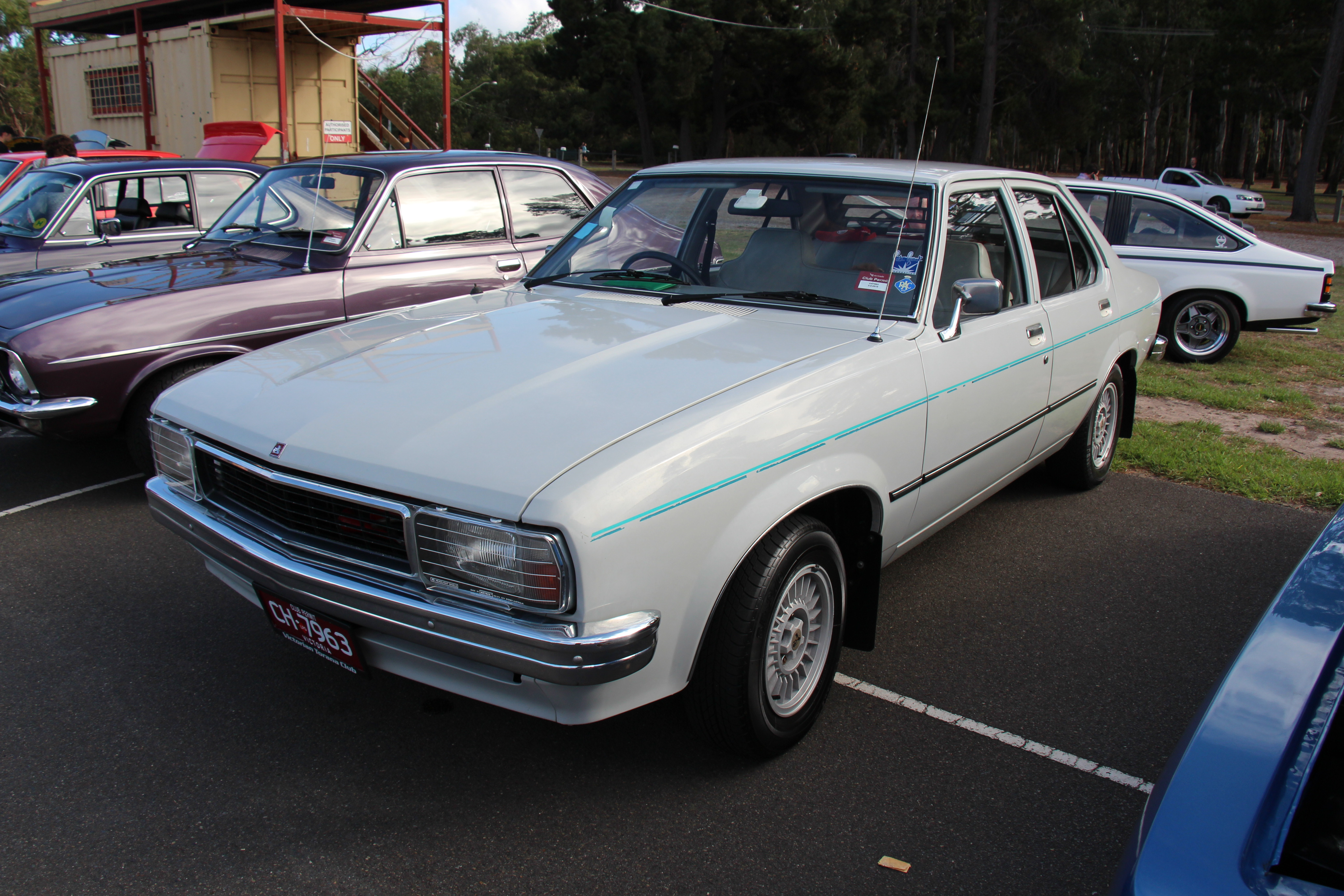
- Holden Torana (UC) sedan

Overview
- Also called: Holden UC Sunbird
- Production: March 1978 – September 1980

Body and chassis
- Body style: 3-door hatchback 4-door sedan

Powertrain
- Engine: 1892 cc Starfire OHV I4 (Sunbird); 1897 cc Opel CIH I4 (Sunbird); 2835 cc Red 173 OHV I6; 3298 cc Red 202 OHV I6

The introduction of the UC Torana in March 1978 brought the end of V8 power and of the sporting SL/R variant in the Torana range of cars. The UC series featured a significantly altered frontal appearance (The UCs had square headlamps and a smoother front end), and a completely new interior dash layout. Torana was now rationalised to a choice of two equipment levels and two six-cylinder engines, the 2.85-litre and the 3.3-litre. A 'Deluxe Pack' was an option that allowed the UC Torana SL to compete with Ford's TE Cortina Ghia, which comprised laminated windscreen, tinted side and rear windows, intermittent wipers, radio/cassette player, cloth trim, sports instrumentation, and bumper overriders. While the V8 was discontinued in the UC, a factory-sanctioned dealer option of a turbo was offered. This was called the UC SL/T. These were mainly ordered through Suttons in NSW, but one is known to have been ordered through Zupps in Queensland. These were produced in small production runs of five cars and only 33 were built. Only one is known to exist today; it was ordered through Zupps.

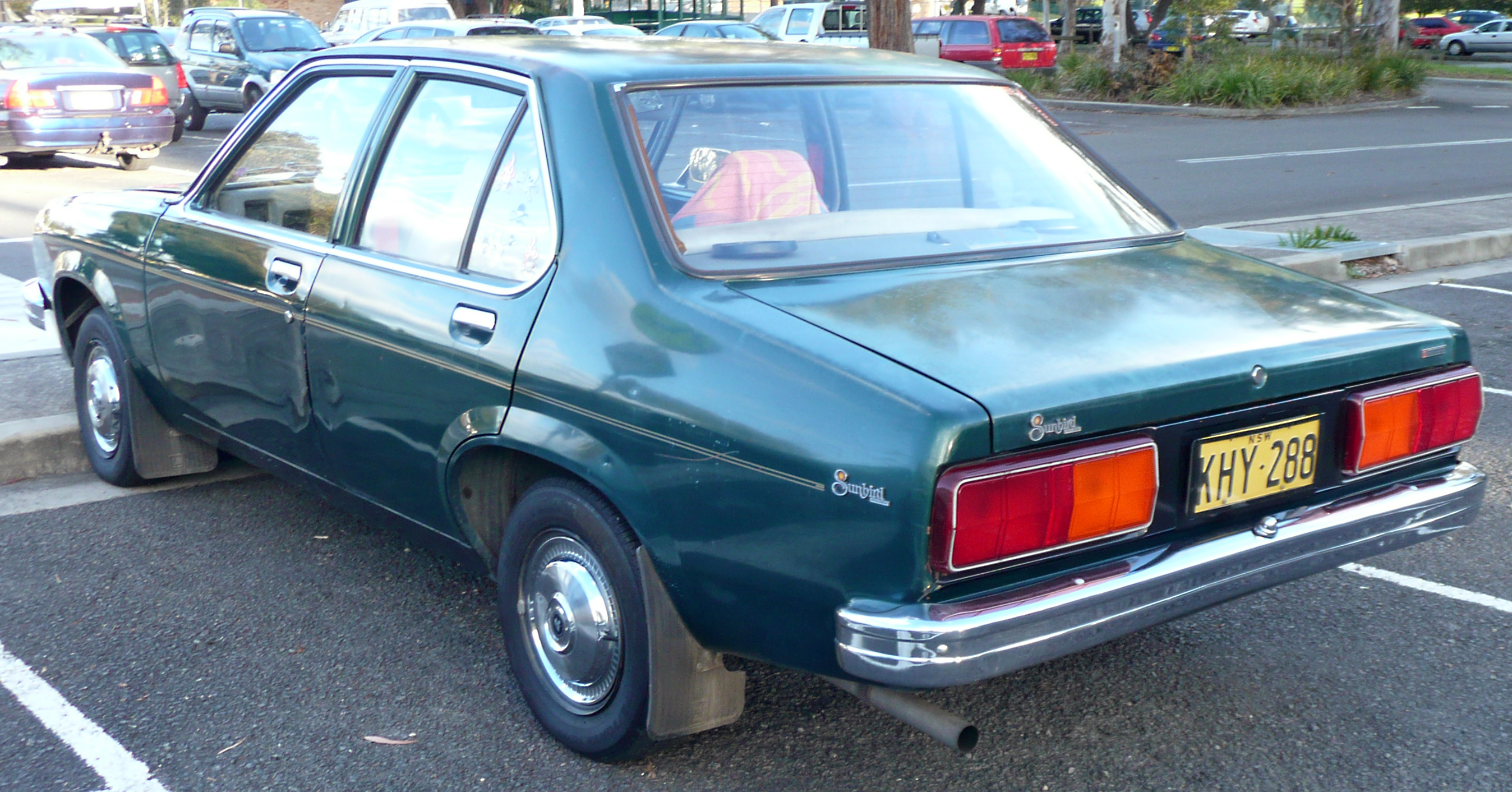
Holden Sunbird (UC) sedan

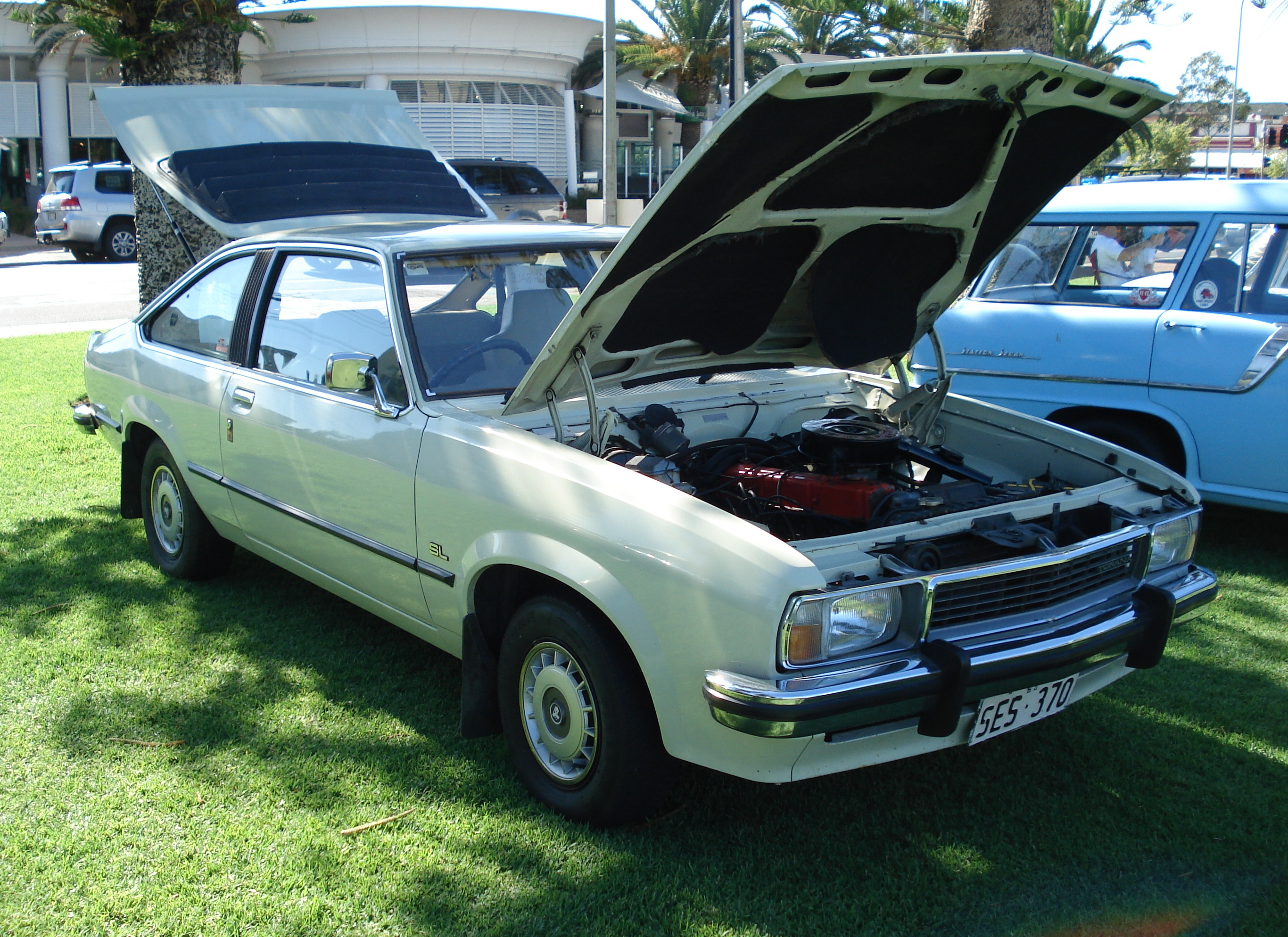
Holden Torana (UC) SL hatchback

The Holden Sunbird was also updated to UC specifications and continued to sell well as a 1.9-litre four-cylinder car, sharing its body architecture with the UC Torana sedan and hatchback. The UC Sunbird expanded into three trim levels: base (manual only), SL, and SL/E. It did very well in New Zealand, where it was assembled, particularly in fleets, where it competed with the Ford Cortina and a variety of Japanese D-segment models.

Early UC Sunbirds retained the 1.9-litre Opel engine used in the LX. Later UC models (from September 1978) had the locally produced 1,892-cc Starfire Four engine that was also installed into the Australian-produced versions of the Toyota Corona and in four-cylinder versions of the Holden Commodore. This motor was a cut-down version of the long-running Holden six-cylinder engine. The hatchbacks were deleted in 1979, leaving only the sedans for the 1980 model year. The last Australian Sunbird was built in September 1980. The Sunbird was replaced initially by a four-cylinder version of the Holden Commodore, before the arrival of its natural, albeit smaller, successor, the Holden Camira, from 1982.

At one point, design consideration was given to a five-door hatchback version of the UC Torana, which had a similar side profile to the Rover SD1 and rode an extended wheelbase. The idea never got past the clay-modelling stage, probably in most part due to the impending introduction of the GM V-Car, the Commodore.

After release of the VB Commodore in November 1978, it soon became clear to GM-H that the Torana was too similar in size to the incoming car. As a result, the UC Torana was dropped from the Holden range in 1979. The UC Sunbird continued through 1980 with the new, locally manufactured 1.9-litre Starfire 4 engine (based on the 2.85-litre six) replacing the imported Opel unit.

For a while at least, talk of further extending the Torana/Sunbird's production life beyond 1980 occurred, with a facelifted 'UD' model, of which prototype models of the sedan and hatchback were actually built - featuring frontal styling similar to the Opel Ascona B. However, due to the car itself being outdated when compared to the new Japanese opposition (notably the Chrysler Sigma, Datsun Bluebird, and Mazda 626), Holden decided on an easier route by simply introducing the Starfire engine into the VC-series of Commodore sedans and wagons.

Ultimately, the title of four-cylinder mid-sized Holden was taken over in 1982 by the Camira, Holden's version of GM's front-wheel drive 'J-Car'. However, the Starfire engine did remain available for another two years in the VH-series Holden Commodore, and continued to be fitted to the VK-series in New Zealand.

Just over 55,000 UC series Toranas and Sunbirds were produced.

== Torana concept cars ==
=== Torana GTR-X ===
GTR-X
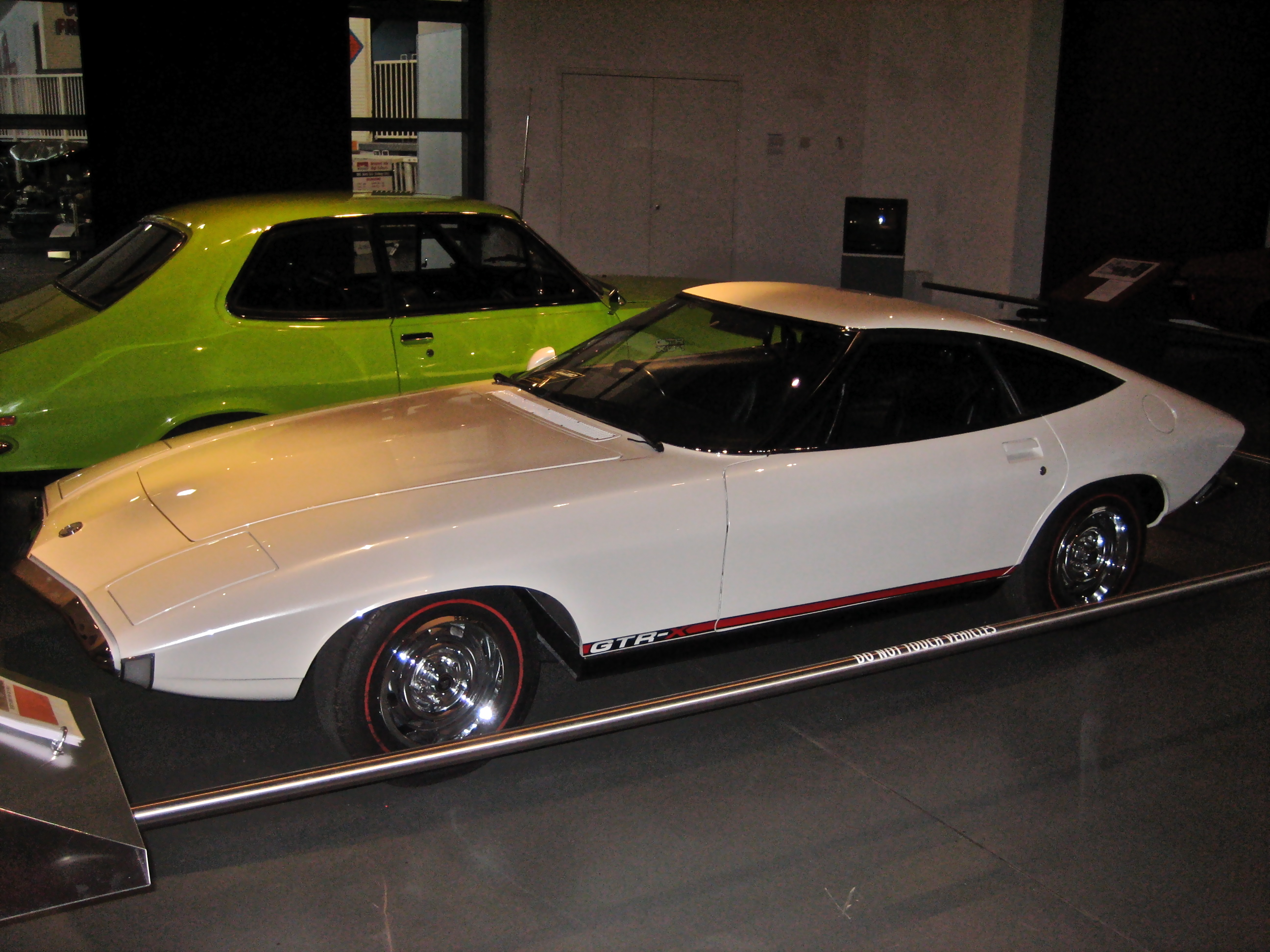

Overview
- Type: Concept car
- Production: Initially 1970 (3 Bodies built but never released)
- Designer: Joe Schemansky, Phillip Zmood

Body and chassis
- Body style: 2-door coupé
- Layout: FR layout

Powertrain
- Engine: 186 cu in (3,049 cc) GMH Red OHV I6; 253 cu in (4,143 cc) GMH 253 OHV V8

The Torana GTR-X was designed during the era of the LC series, and was seriously considered for production in the early 1970s. The GTR-X had a wedge-shaped fibreglass body featuring a hatchback rear access, and the prototype cars had LC Torana GTR XU-1 mechanical components.

The GTR-X looks similar to iconic sports cars of the 1970s, such as the Maserati Khamsin and the Porsche 924. It weighed 1,043 kg (2,299 lb) and has a top speed of 210 km/h (130 mph). The Torana GTR-X in production would have been the first Holden car to be factory fitted with four-wheel disc brakes.

When Holden released a promotional brochure about the GTR-X, they said, "Its long, sleek hood is accentuated by a low, wedge-shaped grille. The body line sweeps up at the rear to an elevated tail light assembly. Simplicity is the keynote. It is achieved by concealed headlights, sharp windshield rake, recessed parking and turning lights, and flush petrol filler access and door handles. Front and rear bumpers assume the contour of the body. To identify the car, the GTR-X identification is contained within a crisp black and orange stripe running parallel to the rocker panel".

The Torana GTR-X was highly developed by Holden from concept, and though brochures, photography and promotional films were produced to show how serious they were in putting the car into production, the company was ultimately unable to justify the high cost of committing itself to production given the size of the Australian population then.

The only existing complete prototype GTR-X car was originally white, but painted silver in the mid '70s. It had UC Torana SL/E wheels fitted and a few other cosmetic changes (bonnet badge, etc.) made in an attempt by Holden to update the car for the times and "restore it". During this period, it toured motor museums around Australia. In 2003, the car was returned to its original colour and build condition by Car Shine in Melbourne, prior to being shipped to the General Motors Technical Center in Michigan for their celebration of automotive design spanning 75 years. This car is now on display at the National Motor Museum, Birdwood South Australia.

One other pre-production GTR-X is in the hands of a former long-time Holden employee, along with the body mould jig to make more fibreglass bodies. Whether this car will ever be finished is unknown due to the age of the owner. The picture of this orange car can be seen in Norm Darwin's book release of the Torana, but the name and location of the owner is kept secret to prevent possible theft.

=== Torana Mystere ===
Mystere
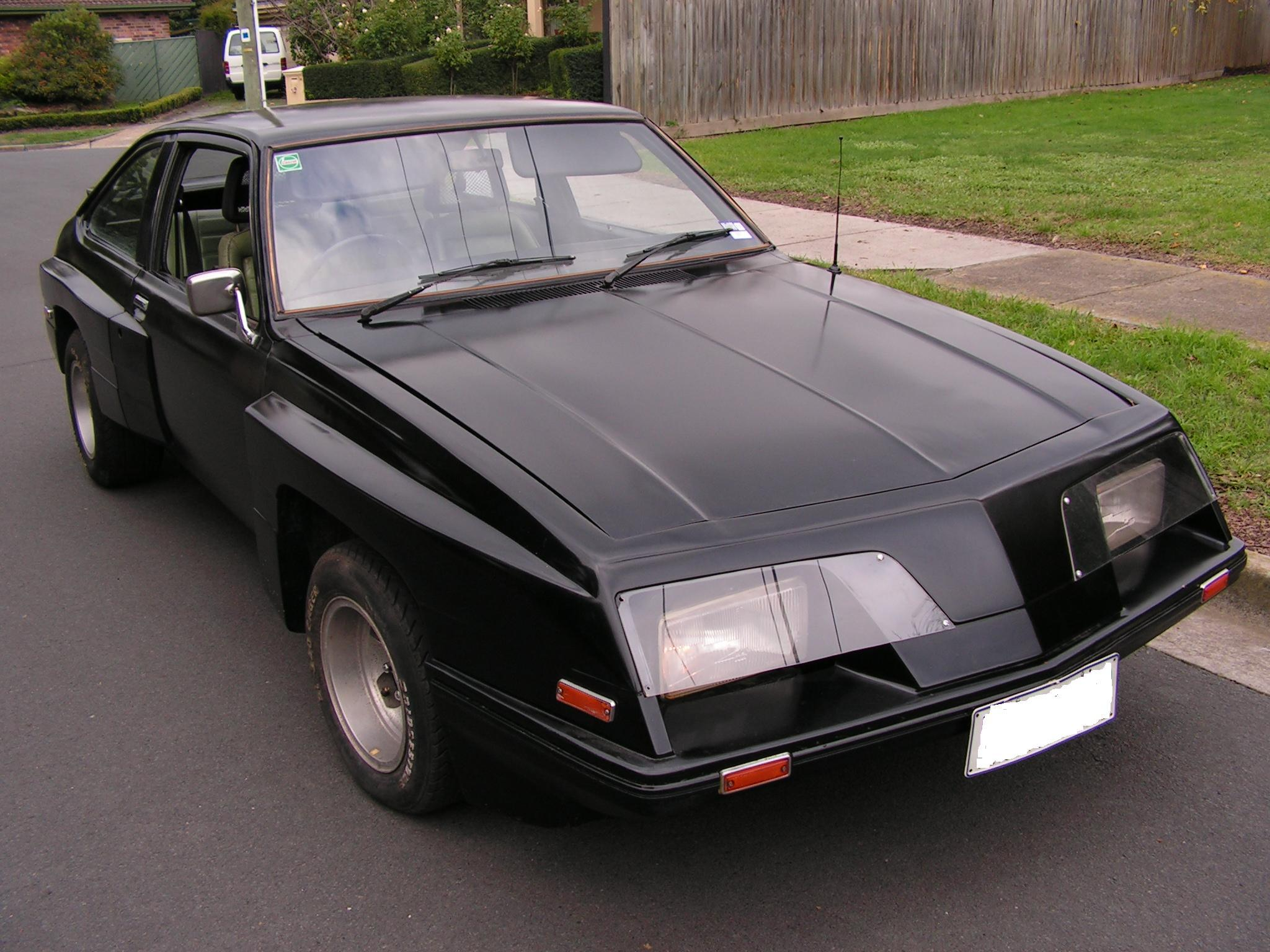

Overview
- Type: Concept car
- Production: 1977 (1 built)
- Designer: Peter Arcadipane

Body and chassis
- Body style: 2-door coupé
- Layout: FR layout

Powertrain
- Engine: 308 cu in (5,044 cc) GMH 308 OHV V8
- Transmission: 4-speed manual

In 1977, Recaro built a concept car for the 1977 Sydney Motor Show; the vehicle was based on a Holden Torana LX SS Hatchback. Appearing on the front cover of the October 1977 Modern Motor magazine, the concept was put together by the Recaro Australia managing director David Bones and marketing director Robin Luck (a former editor of Modern Motor).

The vehicle was designed and built by Arcadipane Automotive (Peter Arcadipane), featuring a 'Monza' style front end coupled with a rear end that had been shortened by some 355 mm and was powered by a 308-cu in V8 backed up by an M21 four-speed manual transmission. The plan was to release the vehicle once two key issues were ironed out, those being; confirmation of GMH's backing for mechanical warranty and getting the cost of the vehicle below $15,000. In addition to the body modifications, the key unique feature of the vehicle was its interior. Recaro commissioned a special tanner in West Germany to produce sufficient hides to upholster all seats in a unique green colour that was to be a feature of the car's paintwork. The cost of this full leather interior, however, formed a significant challenge in meeting the $15,000 target price.

Only one Mystere was produced. The vehicle has survived and is owned by an enthusiast in Melbourne.

=== Torana TT36 ===
Torana TT36
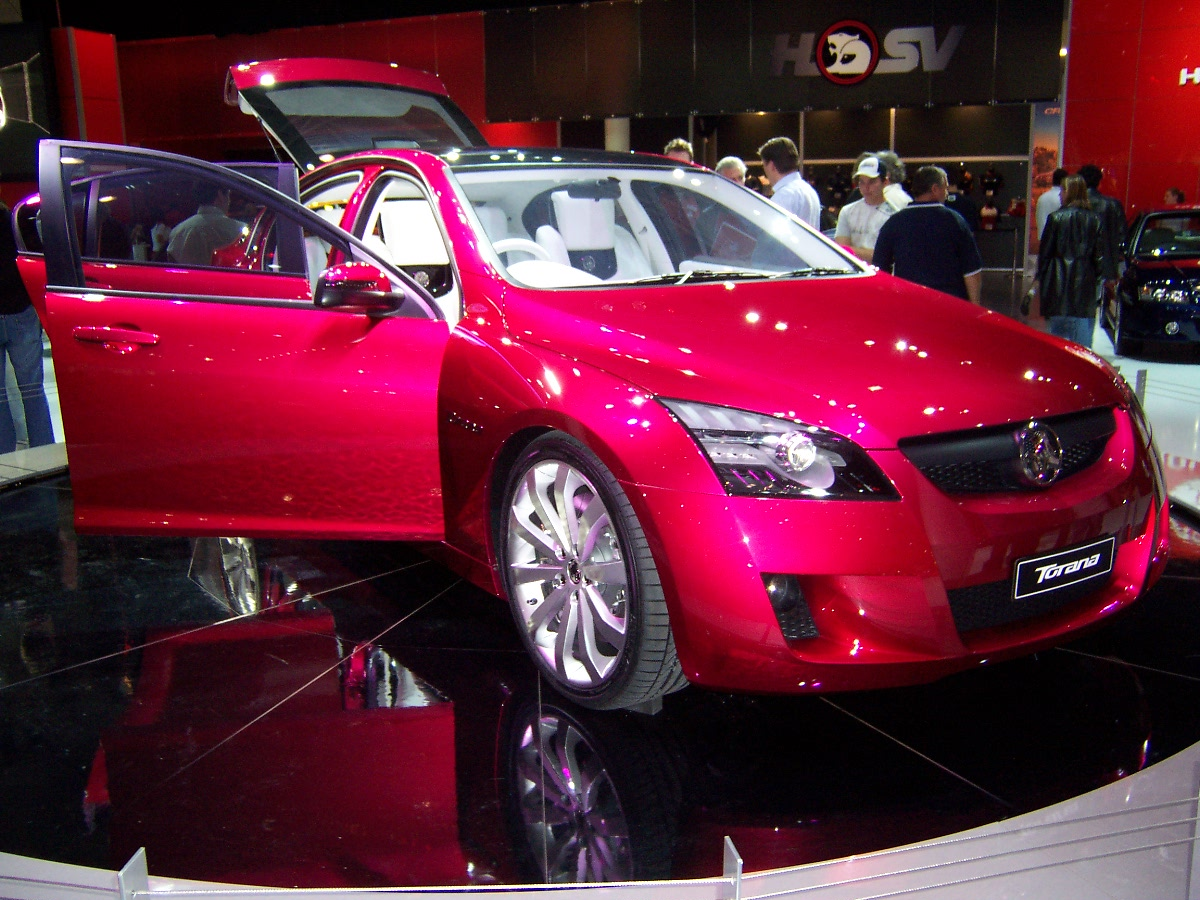

Overview
- Type: Concept car
- Production: 2004 (1 built)
- Designer: Ewan Kingsbury

Body and chassis
- Body style: 5-door hatchback
- Layout: FR layout
- Platform: General Motors Zeta platform

Powertrain
- Engine: 3.6 L Twin Turbo HFV6
- Transmission: 6-speed manual

In 2004, Holden released a luminous, hot pink or "ManGenta" medium-sized, rear-drive concept car called the Torana TT36 (Twin Turbo; 3.6-litre V6). The project was originally named XP54, reflecting the acronym 'eXperimental Project' and coded 54 in recognition of Holden's so-called Studio 54 design workshop in the outer suburbs of Melbourne. The model was said to debut a new platform for General Motors and previewed the look of the 2006 VE Commodore.

By applying twin KO4 Warner turbochargers, an air-to-air intercooler, and variable valve actuation to its Alloytec 190, then dropping the compression to 9.0:1, Holden engineers were able to deliver a power peak of 280 kW (375 hp) and no less than 480Nm of torque, with 90% available from just 1600 rpm.

The prototype first visited the National Motor Museum at Birdwood in the Adelaide Hills in early 2008 and has returned on several occasions, most recently in September 2019.

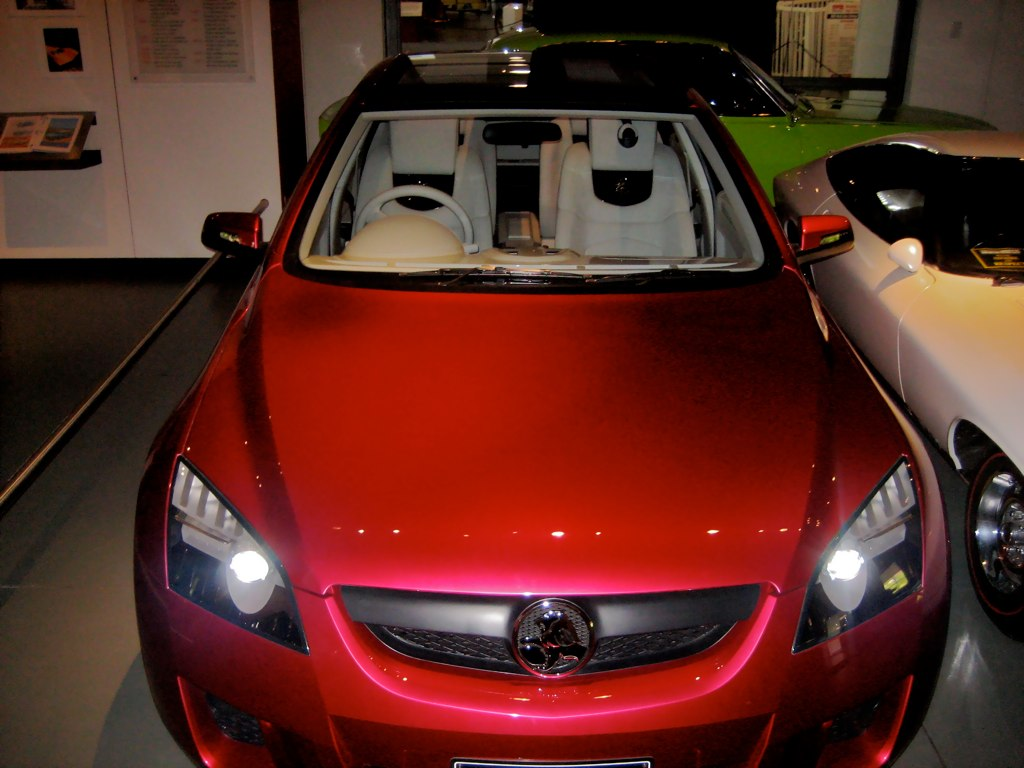
Holden TT36 Torana.

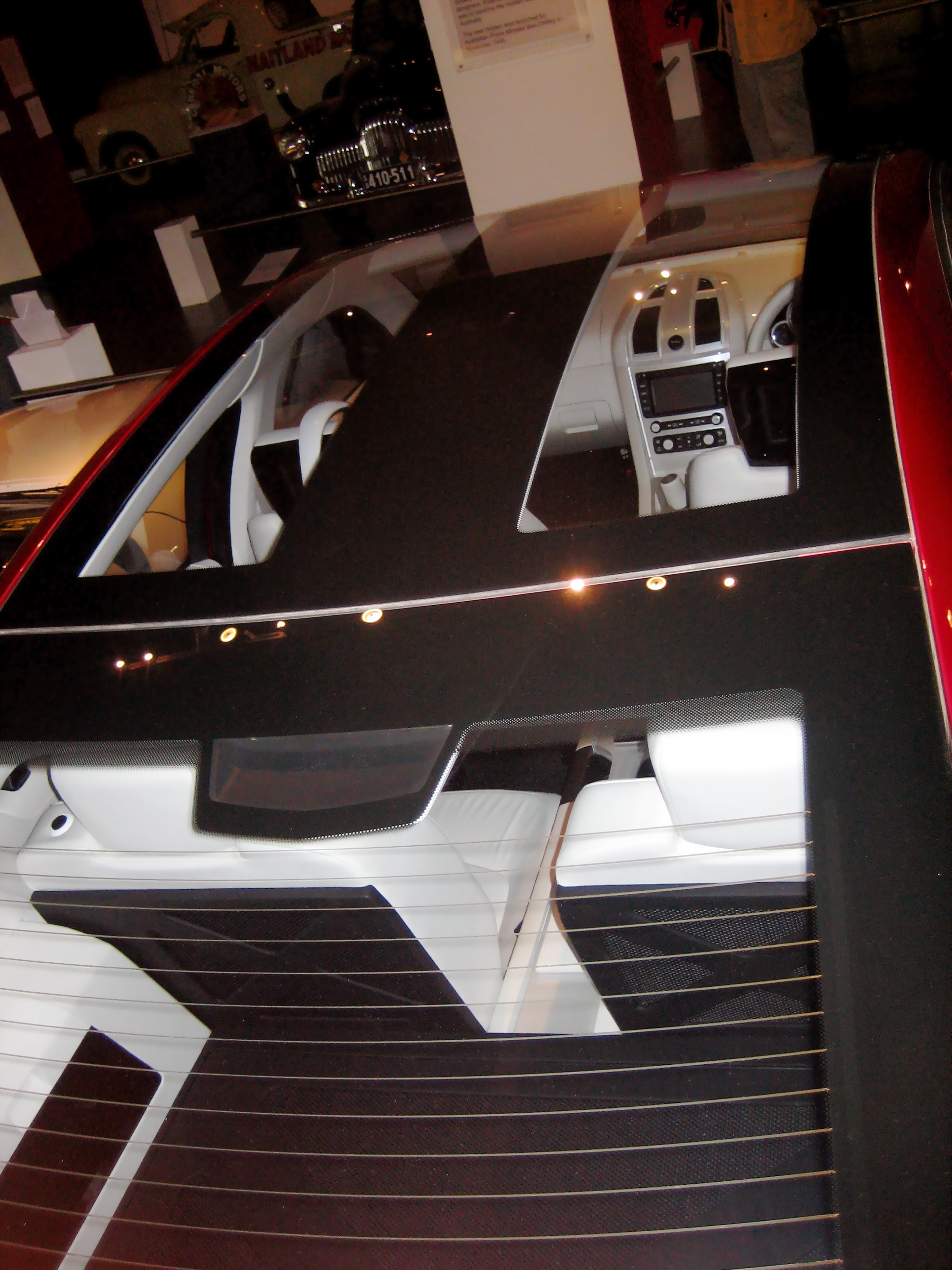
The TT36's clear roof.
