= Calder Park V8 Supercar round =

Motor racing event in Melbourne, Australia

(Victoria (state)) Calder Park V8 Supercar round
- Race Information
Venue	Calder Park Raceway
Number of times held	25
First held	1969
Last held	2001
- Race Format
- Race 1
Laps	21
Distance	50 km
- Race 2
Laps	21
Distance	50 km
- Race 3
Laps	21
Distance	50 km
- Last Event (2001)
- Overall Winner
(Australia) Paul Morris	Paul Morris Motorsport
- Race Winners
(Australia) Steven Johnson	Dick Johnson Racing
(Australia) Paul Morris	Paul Morris Motorsport
(Australia) Paul Morris	Paul Morris Motorsport

The Calder Park V8 Supercar round was a V8 Supercar, and formerly Australian Touring Car Championship, motor racing event held at Calder Park Raceway in Melbourne, Victoria, Australia. The event was held 25 times between 1969 and 2001.

== History ==
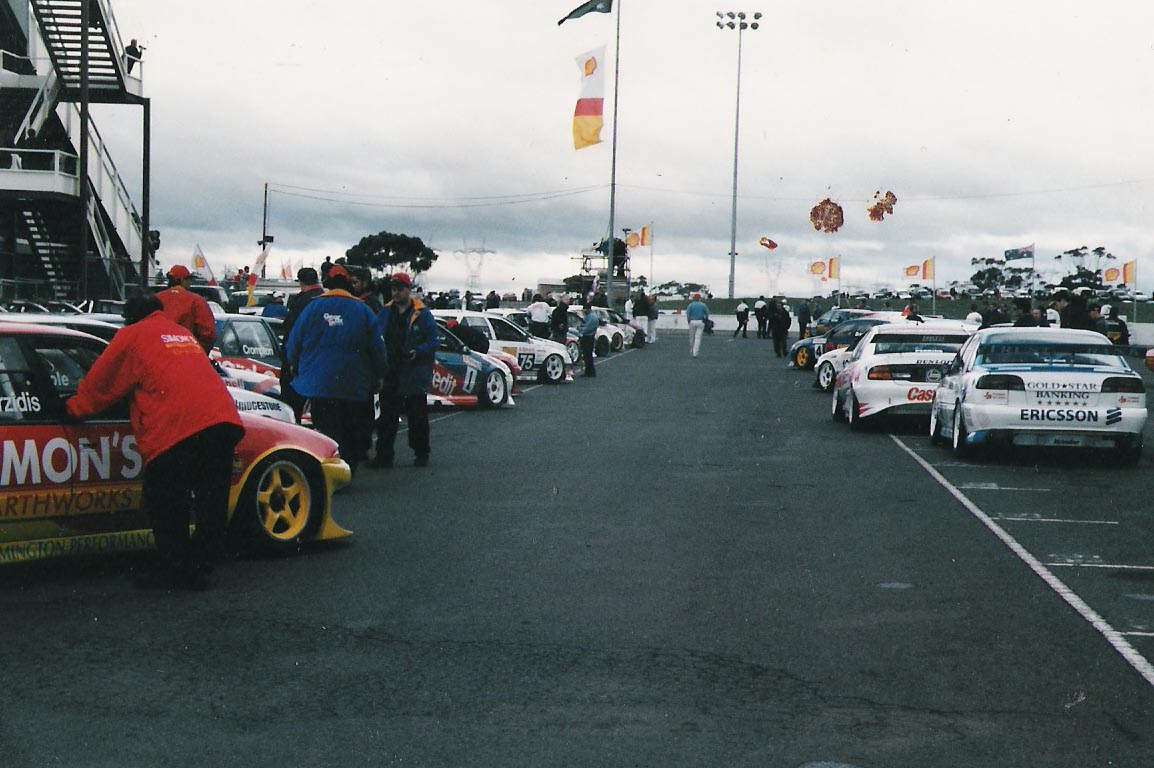
V8 Supercars line up in the dummy grid in 1998.

Calder Park's first championship round was the first round of the 1969 season, the first championship to be held over multiple rounds. It was won by Bob Jane who, soon after, purchased the circuit and also won the 1972 round. Allan Moffat became the most successful driver in the event's history through the 1970s and 1980s, winning five events. Peter Brock also won three consecutive events for the Holden Dealer Team from 1979 to 1981. This included the first night race in championship history in 1980. The 1987 championship round, won by Glenn Seton, saw the world debut of, amongst others, the BMW M3 and the Ford Sierra RS Cosworth. It was the first of three major touring car races at the circuit in 1987, with a post-season endurance race and the Bob Jane T-Marts 500, a round of the World Touring Car Championship, held on the combined road circuit and oval layout. After an agreement was reached for the circuit to not include any cigarette sponsorship, the circuit was removed off the calendar from 1989 through 1995.

With tobacco advertising banned in Australia in late 1995, touring car racing returned to the circuit with a non-championship event celebrating Peter Brock in November 1995. The circuit then returned to the championship proper in 1996, and Russell Ingall began a six-year unbeaten run for Holden. Calder Park was the opening event of the 1997 season. It was held at night for the first time at Calder Park since 1980 and was the last championship night race until 2018. The round was won by Wayne Gardner, the only championship win for him and his team. The third race in 1998 was cancelled due to torrential rain. In 1999, in what was the 400th championship race of all time, a major crash at the start of the race saw Craig Lowndes barrel roll down an embankment on the side of the track, causing injuries which forced him to miss the next round at Symmons Plains Raceway. At the second attempted start, a similar but less dramatic crash saw Jason Bright fired into the wall before Turn 1. Lowndes' team-mate Mark Skaife eventually went on to win the race and the round. Mark Larkham won his only championship race victory in the second race in 2000, only three weeks after a fiery crash at the Oran Park round that wrote off his previous chassis. In what became the 25th and final event at the circuit in 2001, Paul Morris, who like Gardner and Larkham was driving for his eponymous team, won his first championship race and round.

The circuit was not included on the 2002 calendar, after a financial dispute between circuit owner Bob Jane and the series, and the circuit has since fallen into disrepair.

== Winners ==
Year	Driver	Team	Car	Report
1969	(Australia) Bob Jane	Bob Jane Racing	Ford Mustang	
1970	(Canada) Allan Moffat	Allan Moffat Racing	Ford Boss 302 Mustang	
1971	(Australia) Norm Beechey	Shell Racing	Holden HT Monaro GTS350	
1972	(Australia) Bob Jane	Bob Jane Racing	Chevrolet Camaro ZL-1	
1973	(Canada) Allan Moffat	Ford Works Team	Ford XY Falcon GTHO Phase III	
1974	(Australia) Peter Brock	Holden Dealer Team	Holden LJ Torana GTR XU-1	
1975	(Australia) Allan Grice	Craven Mild Racing	Holden LH Torana SL/R 5000 L34	
1976	(Canada) Allan Moffat	Allan Moffat Racing	Ford XB Falcon GT Hardtop	
1977	(Canada) Allan Moffat	Allan Moffat Racing	Ford XB Falcon GT Hardtop	
1978	(Australia) Bob Morris	Ron Hodgson Motors	Holden LX Torana SS A9X	
1979	(Australia) Peter Brock	Holden Dealer Team	Holden LX Torana SS A9X	
1980	(Australia) Peter Brock	Holden Dealer Team	Holden VB Commodore	
1981	(Australia) Peter Brock	Holden Dealer Team	Holden VC Commodore	
1982	(Australia) Dick Johnson	Dick Johnson Racing	Ford XD Falcon	
1983	(Canada) Allan Moffat	Allan Moffat Racing	Mazda RX-7	
1984	not held			
1985	(New Zealand) Jim Richards	JPS Team BMW	BMW 635 CSi	
1986	(Australia) George Fury	Gibson Motorsport	Nissan Skyline DR30 RS	
1987	(Australia) Glenn Seton	Gibson Motorsport	Nissan Skyline DR30 RS	
1988	(Australia) Dick Johnson	Dick Johnson Racing	Ford Sierra RS500	
1989 – 1995	not held			
1996	(Australia) Russell Ingall	Perkins Engineering	Holden VR Commodore	
1997	(Australia) Wayne Gardner	Wayne Gardner Racing	Holden VS Commodore	
1998	(Australia) Craig Lowndes	Holden Racing Team	Holden VS Commodore	
1999	(Australia) Mark Skaife	Holden Racing Team	Holden VT Commodore	
2000	(New Zealand) Steven Richards	Gibson Motorsport	Holden VT Commodore	
2001	(Australia) Paul Morris	Paul Morris Motorsport	Holden VT Commodore	Report

== Multiple winners ==
=== By driver ===
Wins	Driver	Years
5	(Canada) Allan Moffat	1970, 1973, 1976, 1977, 1983
4	(Australia) Peter Brock	1974, 1979, 1980, 1981
2	(Australia) Bob Jane	1969, 1972
2	(Australia) Dick Johnson	1982, 1988

=== By team ===
Wins	Team
4	Holden Dealer Team
4	Allan Moffat Racing
3	Gibson Motorsport
2	Bob Jane Racing
2	Dick Johnson Racing
2	Holden Racing Team

=== By manufacturer ===
Wins	Manufacturer
13	Holden
7	Ford
2	Nissan

== Event names and sponsors ==
- 1969–83, 1987–88, 1996–2001: Calder Park
- 1985: Eurovox Trophy
- 1986: Coca-Cola Cup

== See also ==
- List of Australian Touring Car Championship races
