= Oran Park V8 Supercar round =

Australian racing track

(New South Wales) Oran Park V8 Supercar round
- Race Information
Venue	Oran Park Raceway
Number of times held	38
First held	1971
Last held	2008
- Race Format
- Race 1
Laps	46
Distance	120 km
- Race 2
Laps	46
Distance	120 km
- Race 3
Laps	46
Distance	120 km
- Last Event (2008)
- Overall Winner
(Australia) Garth Tander	Holden Racing Team
- Race Winners
(Australia) Jamie Whincup	Triple Eight Race Engineering
(Australia) Garth Tander	Holden Racing Team
(Australia) Rick Kelly	HSV Dealer Team

The Oran Park V8 Supercar round was a V8 Supercar, and formerly Australian Touring Car Championship, motor racing event held at Oran Park Raceway in Narellan, New South Wales, Australia. The event was held in every year from 1971 to 2008, with only three circuits having hosted more events in championship history as of 2020.

== History ==
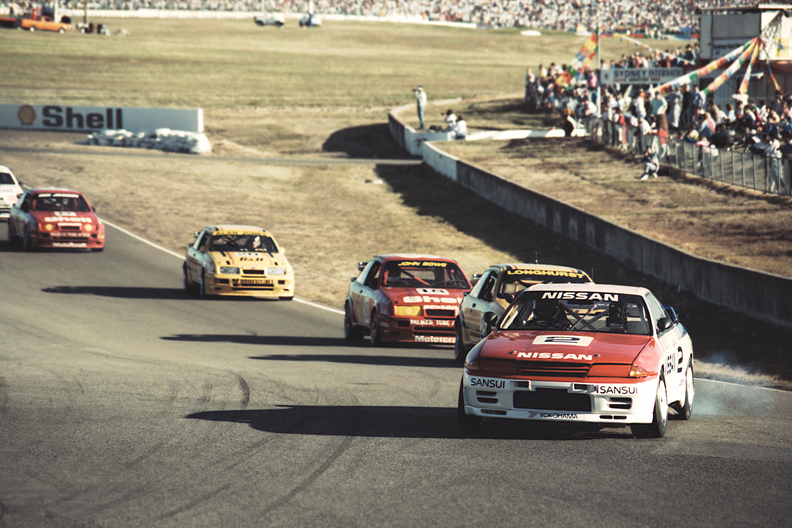
Jim Richards leads the opening lap of the 1990 round.

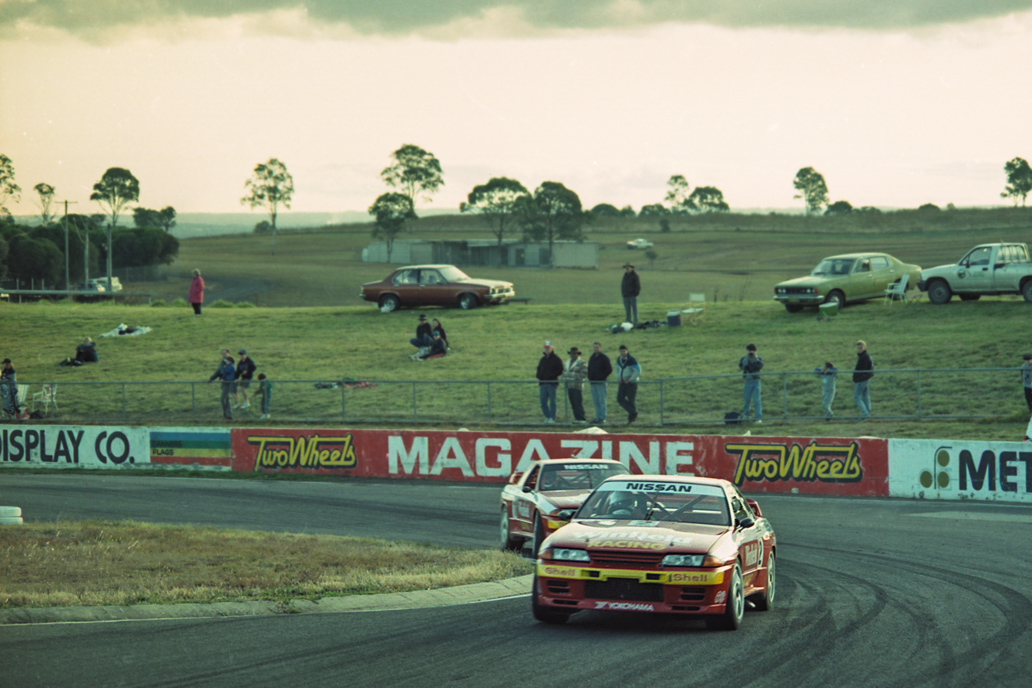
Mark Skaife on his way to winning the 1992 round.

The Oran Park round of the championship was often held as the final round of the Australian Touring Car Championship and as such decided several championship titles. The first of these was in the inaugural event in 1971, with Bob Jane, Ian Geoghegan and Allan Moffat all entering the round with a chance of winning the championship. Moffat had led the race early before hitting problems, eventually closing down Jane in the final laps but unable to overtake. The race was also infamous for a spectator driving their Chrysler Valiant onto the circuit during the race, and in 2016 was considered as one of the top five races in championship history. In 1972, Moffat won the last championship round for the Ford Mustang nameplate until 2019. In the 1970s, two events were split into two races based on engine capacities. In these smaller capacity races, Ray Gulson in 1974 and Lawrie Nelson in 1979 won their only career championship races. The 1980 race was held on the Queen's Birthday public holiday Monday, having been postponed from the Sunday due to heavy rain. Bob Morris won the 1984 event, despite not only having not competed in any other championship round that year, but having not competed at all in the ATCC since he won the 1980 Oran Park event. The 1980s saw significant variety in the results, with seven different marques taking an event win. From 1985 to 1998 the circuit returned to the season-ending event on the calendar. One of the more controversial deciders in the circuit's history occurred in 1987 with championship combatants Jim Richards and Glenn Seton making contact as Richards took the lead and the championship victory. In 1989, long-time Holden driver Peter Brock won his first championship round aboard a Ford.

At the 1992 event, Mark Skaife won both the Australian Touring Car Championship and the Australian Drivers' Championship in a Formula Brabham open-wheeler on the same day. Four-time series champion Jim Richards won his final solo round at the 1993 event. The 1995 championship decider saw John Bowe defeat Seton and Brock in a three-way battle for the title. In 1997, Brock farewelled the sport as a full-time driver at the event, winning the first race and only losing a likely round victory late in the third race when a puncture dropped him down the order. At the same event, Glenn Seton secured his second championship, ten years after his battle with Richards, in another three-way decider. The 1997 event was part of a seven-year streak of wins from the Holden Racing Team, each of the last four going to Skaife. In doing this, Skaife joined Moffat with a record six round wins at the circuit.

The 2000 event was notable for a large start-line crash involving Larry Perkins, Paul Morris and Mark Larkham. Perkins stalled on the grid, and was hit by Morris who was then hit by Larkham, the latter two cars exploding into flames. All drivers escaped without serious injury. The 2005 event saw Russell Ingall win the only round of his championship-winning year. In 2007, Lee Holdsworth won his first championship race and round at the event in wet conditions. The 2008 event, branded under the Grand Finale umbrella, saw Jamie Whincup seal his first championship title, as well as Mark Skaife enter his final event as a full-time driver. It was also marred by an accident in the Australian Formula Ford Championship support category that saw Lucas Dumbrell left a quadriplegic. The event itself, won by Garth Tander, was the final championship event for the circuit, with Rick Kelly winning the final race at the circuit. Following the 2008 event the circuit was demolished for a housing redevelopment.

== Winners ==
The original circuit layout used in the 1970s

Year	Driver	Entrant	Car	Report
1971	(Australia) Bob Jane	Bob Jane Racing Team	Chevrolet Camaro ZL-1	
1972	(Canada) Allan Moffat	Allan Moffat Racing	Ford Boss 302 Mustang	
1973	(Canada) Allan Moffat	Ford Works Team	Ford XY Falcon GTHO Phase 3	
1974	(Canada) Allan Moffat	Allan Moffat Racing	Ford XB Falcon GT Hardtop	
1975	(Australia) Allan Grice	Craven Mild Racing	Holden LH Torana SL/R 5000 L34	
1976	(Canada) Allan Moffat	Allan Moffat Racing	Ford XB Falcon GT Hardtop	
1977	(Canada) Allan Moffat	Allan Moffat Racing	Ford XB Falcon GT Hardtop	
1978	(Australia) Peter Brock	Holden Dealer Team	Holden LX Torana A9X SS	
1979	(Australia) Bob Morris	Ron Hodgson Motors	Holden Torana LX A9X SS	
1980	(Australia) Bob Morris	Craven Mild Racing	Holden VB Commodore	
1981	(Australia) Dick Johnson	Dick Johnson Racing	Ford XD Falcon	
1982	(Australia) Kevin Bartlett	Nine Network Racing Team	Chevrolet Camaro Z28	
1983	(Canada) Allan Moffat	Allan Moffat Racing	Mazda RX-7	
1984	(Australia) Bob Morris	Barry Jones	Mazda RX-7	
1985	(New Zealand) Robbie Francevic	Mark Petch Motorsport	Volvo 240T	
1986	(Australia) George Fury	Gibson Motorsport	Nissan Skyline DR30 RS	
1987	(New Zealand) Jim Richards	JPS Team BMW	BMW M3	
1988	(Australia) Dick Johnson	Dick Johnson Racing	Ford Sierra RS500	
1989	(Australia) Peter Brock	Mobil 1 Racing	Ford Sierra RS500	
1990	(New Zealand) Jim Richards	Gibson Motorsport	Nissan Skyline R32 GT-R	
1991	(Australia) Mark Skaife	Gibson Motorsport	Nissan Skyline R32 GT-R	
1992	(Australia) Mark Skaife	Gibson Motorsport	Nissan Skyline R32 GT-R	
1993	(New Zealand) Jim Richards	Gibson Motorsport	Holden VP Commodore	
1994	(Australia) Glenn Seton	Glenn Seton Racing	Ford EB Falcon	Report
1995	(Australia) John Bowe	Dick Johnson Racing	Ford EF Falcon	
1996	(Australia) Peter Brock	Holden Racing Team	Holden VR Commodore	
1997	(New Zealand) Greg Murphy	Holden Racing Team	Holden VS Commodore	
1998	(Australia) Craig Lowndes	Holden Racing Team	Holden VS Commodore	
1999	(Australia) Mark Skaife	Holden Racing Team	Holden VT Commodore	Report
2000	(Australia) Mark Skaife	Holden Racing Team	Holden VT Commodore	
2001	(Australia) Mark Skaife	Holden Racing Team	Holden VX Commodore	Report
2002	(Australia) Mark Skaife	Holden Racing Team	Holden VX Commodore	
2003	(Australia) Marcos Ambrose	Stone Brothers Racing	Ford BA Falcon	
2004	(Australia) Marcos Ambrose	Stone Brothers Racing	Ford BA Falcon	
2005	(Australia) Russell Ingall	Stone Brothers Racing	Ford BA Falcon	
2006	(Australia) Craig Lowndes	Triple Eight Race Engineering	Ford BA Falcon	
2007	(Australia) Lee Holdsworth	Garry Rogers Motorsport	Holden VE Commodore	Report
2008	(Australia) Garth Tander	Holden Racing Team	Holden VE Commodore	Report

== Multiple winners ==
=== By driver ===
Wins	Driver	Years
6	(Canada) Allan Moffat	1972, 1973, 1974, 1976, 1977, 1983
6	(Australia) Mark Skaife	1991, 1992, 1999, 2000, 2001, 2002
3	(Australia) Bob Morris	1979, 1980, 1984
3	(New Zealand) Jim Richards	1987, 1990, 1993
3	(Australia) Peter Brock	1978, 1989, 1996
2	(Australia) Dick Johnson	1981, 1988
2	(Australia) Marcos Ambrose	2003, 2004
2	(Australia) Craig Lowndes	1998, 2006

=== By team ===
Wins	Team
8	Holden Racing Team
5	Allan Moffat Racing
5	Gibson Motorsport
3	Dick Johnson Racing
3	Stone Brothers Racing
2	Craven Mild Racing
2	Holden Dealer Team^{1}

=== By manufacturer ===
Wins	Manufacturer
14	Ford
14	Holden
4	Nissan
2	Chevrolet
2	Mazda

Notes

- ^1 – Holden Dealer Team was known as Mobil 1 Racing from 1988 to 1990, hence their statistics are combined.

== Event sponsors ==
- 1981: Marlboro
- 1982: ARCO
- 1984–86: Castrol
- 2007: Jim Beam
- 2008: NRMA Motoring & Services

== See also ==
- List of Australian Touring Car Championship races
