= 1973 Australian Touring Car Championship =

Motor racing competition

Seasons
- ← 1972 1974 →

The 1973 Australian Touring Car Championship was an Australian motor racing competition for Group C Touring Cars. It began at Symmons Plains on 5 March 1973 and ended at Warwick Farm after eight rounds. The championship, which was authorised by the Confederation of Australian Motor Sport as an Australian National Title, was the 14th running of the Australian Touring Car Championship.

The championship was won by Allan Moffat in a Ford Falcon GTHO Phase III.

The night before Round 6 of the series at the Adelaide International Raceway, Moffat's GTHO Falcon was stolen from Stillwell Ford in the northern Adelaide suburb of Medindie. Rather than see Moffat out of the race (he was the series points leader at the time having won the opening 4 rounds and finishing 3rd in round 5), Murray Carter loaned Moffat his GTHO Falcon for the race. Peter Brock won the race while Moffat kept his points lead by finishing second. Moffat's stolen Falcon was later found abandoned in the Adelaide Hills where the thieves who had taken it for a "joy ride" dumped it when it ran out of fuel.

== Entrants and drivers ==
The following drivers competed in the 1973 ATCC. The series consisted of eight rounds held in six different states. As of 2022, Elemer Vajda's entry is still the only Subaru to have contested an ATCC/V8 Supercars race.

| Entrant | Car | No | Driver |
|---|---|---|---|
| Holden Dealer Team | Holden LJ Torana GTR XU-1 | 1 | Peter Brock |
| Grace Brothers Racing | Chrysler Valiant Charger R/T E49 | 1 | Ian Geoghegan |
| Holden Dealer Team | Holden LJ Torana GTR XU-1 | 2 | Peter Brock |
| Murray Carter - Shell Racing | Ford XY Falcon GTHO Phase III | 3 | Murray Carter |
| Dick Johnson | Holden LJ Torana GTR XU-1 | 4 | Dick Johnson |
| McLeod Ford | Ford XA Falcon GT Hardtop | 5 | John Goss |
| Road & Track Auto Services | Ford XY Falcon GTHO Phase III | 6 | Fred Gibson |
| Bob Jane Racing | Holden LJ Torana GTR XU-1 | 7 | Bob Jane |
| Allan Moffat Racing | Ford XY Falcon GTHO Phase III | 9 | Allan Moffat |
| Grace Brothers Racing | Chrysler Valiant Charger R/T E49 | 10 | Ian Geoghegan |
| Holden Dealer Team | Holden LJ Torana GTR XU-1 | 11 | Peter Brock |
| Ron Hodgson Motors | Holden LJ Torana GTR XU-1 | 11 | Bob Morris |
| Bob Holden | Ford Escort Twin Cam | 13 | Bob Holden |
| Peter Robinson Motors Lilydale | Holden LJ Torana GTR XU-1 | 14 | Tony Niovanni |
| John Stoopman | Holden LJ Torana GTR XU-1 | 15 | John Stoopman |
| Graeme Blanchard | Holden LJ Torana GTR XU-1 | 16 | Graeme Blanchard |
| Bryan Thomson | Holden LJ Torana GTR XU-1 | 17 | Bryan Thomson |
| Ted Mudie | Holden LJ Torana GTR XU-1 | 18 | Ted Mudie |
| Cessnock Motor Works | Holden LJ Torana GTR XU-1 | 19 | Allan Grice |
| Rod McRae | Holden LJ Torana GTR XU-1 | 20 | Rod McRae |
| Phil Barnes | Holden LJ Torana GTR XU-1 | 21 | Phil Barnes |
| Phillip Lyon | Ford Escort Twin Cam | 23 | Phillip Lyon |
| Holden Dealer Team | Holden LJ Torana GTR XU-1 | 24 | Colin Bond |
| Graham Parsons | Holden LJ Torana GTR XU-1 | 25 | Graham Parsons |
| Lakis Manticas | Holden LJ Torana GTR XU-1 | 27 | Lakis Manticas |
| Stuart Saker | Holden LJ Torana GTR XU-1 | 29 | Stuart Saker |
| Don Holden | Holden LJ Torana GTR XU-1 | 30 | Don Holland |
| Gary Cooke | Mazda RX-3 | 31 | Gary Cooke |
| Graham Ryan | Holden LJ Torana GTR XU-1 | 32 | Graham Ryan |
| Ken Loughan | Holden LJ Torana GTR XU-1 | 34 | Ken Loughan |
| Alan Cant | Ford Escort Twin Cam | 37 | Alan Cant |
| John Duggan | Holden LJ Torana GTR XU-1 | 39 | John Duggan |
| John French | Ford XY Falcon GTHO Phase III | 44 | John French |
| Rod Housego | Chrysler Valiant Charger R/T E49 | 45 | Rod Housego |
| Lyndon Arnel | Ford Escort Twin Cam | 47 | Lyndon Arnel |
| Geoff Leeds | Ford Escort Twin Cam | 49 | Geoff Leeds |
| Tony Farrell | Ford Escort Twin Cam | 52 | Tony Farrell |
| Barry Bassingthwaite | Ford Escort Twin Cam | 57 | Barry Bassingthwaite |
| Strapp Ford Doncaster | Ford Escort Twin Cam | 58 | Graham Ritter |
| David Jamieson | Ford Mustang | 60 | David Jamieson |
| Campbell Lambert | Morris Cooper S | 61 | Campbell Lambert |
| Tony Watts | Morris Cooper S | 62 | Tony Watts |
| Chris Pawson | Holden LJ Torana GTR XU-1 | 63 | Chris Pawson |
| Westland Autos | Ford XY Falcon GTHO Phase III | 64 | Bill Dickson |
| Werner Tulipan | Holden LJ Torana GTR XU-1 | 66 | Werner Tulipan |
| Peter Granger | Ford Escort Twin Cam | 67 | Peter Granger |
| Nick Munting | Toyota Corolla | 68 | Nick Munting |
| John Dellaca | Morris Cooper S | 69 | John Dellaca |
| Rod Miles | Morris Clubman GT | 72 | Rod Miles |
| Stewart McLeod | Holden LJ Torana GTR XU-1 | 73 | Stewart McLeod |
| Gary Keen | Mazda RX-3 | 75 | Gary Keen |
| Bob Jane Racing | Chevrolet Camaro ZL1 | 76 | Bob Jane |
| Garry Rowe | Ford Escort Twin Cam | 77 | Garry Rowe |
| Martin Anderson | Morris Cooper S | 78 | Martin Anderson |
| Jim Stewart | Morris Cooper S | 79 | Jim Stewart |
| Brett Keightley | Holden LJ Torana GTR XU-1 | 80 | Brett Keightley |
| Elemer Vajda | Subaru FF-1 | 81 | Elemer Vajda |
| Eric Olsen | Ford Escort Twin Cam | 83 | Eric Olsen |
| Paul Gulson | Fiat 128 Coupe | 85 | Paul Gulson |
| Tony Allen | Chrysler Valiant Charger R/T E49 | 87 | Tony Allen |
| Lawrie Nelson | Chrysler Valiant Charger R/T E49 | 88 | Lawrie Nelson |
| John Piper | Ford Escort Twin Cam | 90 | John Piper |
| Mel McEwin | Toyota Corolla | 91 | Mel McEwin |
| Keith McCloy | Morris Cooper S | 94 | Keith McCloy |
| Rod Boyle | Morris Cooper S | 95 | Rod Boyle |
| Graeme Adams | Holden LJ Torana GTR XU-1 | 96 | Graeme Adams |
| Bill Nitschke | Holden LJ Torana GTR XU-1 | 97 | Bill Nitschke |
| World of Tyres | Chrysler Valiant Charger R/T E49 | 98 | Ian Diffen |
| Alfred Colledge | Morris Cooper S | 99 | Alfred Colledge |
| W. S. Nitschke | Holden LJ Torana GTR XU-1 | 101 | John Lewis |
| Paul Moore | Toyota Corolla | 102 | Paul Moore |
| Rod Morris | Morris Cooper S | 107 | Rod Morris |
| Motorama | Holden LJ Torana GTR XU-1 | 154 | Ray Thackwell |

== Calendar ==
The 1973 Australian Touring Car Championship consisted of eight rounds.

| Rd. | Race title | Circuit | City / state | Date | Winning driver | Winning car | Entrant |
|---|---|---|---|---|---|---|---|
| 1 | Symmons Plains | Symmons Plains Raceway | Launceston, Tasmania | 5 March | Allan Moffat | Ford XY Falcon GTHO Phase III | Allan Moffat |
| 2 | Calder | Calder Park Raceway | Melbourne, Victoria | 18 March | Allan Moffat | Ford XY Falcon GTHO Phase III | Allan Moffat |
| 3 | Sandown | Sandown International Raceway | Melbourne, Victoria | 15 April | Allan Moffat | Ford XY Falcon GTHO Phase III | Allan Moffat |
| 4 | Wanneroo | Wanneroo Park | Perth Western Australia | 6 May | Allan Moffat | Ford XY Falcon GTHO Phase III | Allan Moffat |
| 5 | Surfers Paradise | Surfers Paradise International Raceway | Surfers Paradise, Queensland | 20 May | Peter Brock | Holden LJ Torana GTR XU-1 | Holden Dealer Team |
| 6 | Datsun Trophy | Adelaide International Raceway | Adelaide, South Australia | 10 June | Peter Brock | Holden LJ Torana GTR XU-1 | Holden Dealer Team |
| 7 | Oran Park | Oran Park Raceway | Sydney, New South Wales | 24 June | Allan Moffat | Ford XY Falcon GTHO Phase III | Allan Moffat |
| 8 | Warwick Farm | Warwick Farm Raceway | Sydney, New South Wales | 15 July | Peter Brock | Holden LJ Torana GTR XU-1 | Holden Dealer Team |

== Points system ==
Car competed in two classes:

- Up to and including 2000 cc
- Over 2000 cc

Points were awarded on a 9-6-4-3-2-1 basis for the first six positions in each class at each round with additional points awarded on a 4-3-2-1 basis for the first four positions, regardless of class, at each round.

== Championship standings ==
| Pos. | Driver | SYM | CAL | SAN | WAN | SUR | ADE | ORA | WAR | Pts |
|---|---|---|---|---|---|---|---|---|---|---|
| 1 | Allan Moffat | 1st(13) | 1st(13) | 1st(13) | 1st(13) | 3rd(6) | 2nd(9) | 1st(13) | Ret | 80 |
| 2 | Peter Brock | 2nd(9) | Ret | Ret | 2nd(9) | 1st(13) | 1st(13) | DSQ | 1st(13) | 57 |
| 3 | Graham Ritter | 8th(9) | 9th(9) | (9) | 7th(9) | DNS | 7th(9) | Ret | 6th(9) | 54 |
| 4 | Bob Holden | | | (4) | Ret | (4) | Ret | 10th(9) | 7th(6) | 23 |
| 4 | Eric Olsen | Ret | 10th(6) | (3) | 8th(6) | 10th(6) | (2) | | | 23 |
| 6 | Ian Geoghegan | | Ret | 3rd(6) | Ret | 2nd(9) | Ret | Ret | 3rd(6) | 21 |
| 7 | Fred Gibson | | 2nd(9) | | | 4th(4) | | 3rd(6) | Ret | 19 |
| 8 | Murray Carter | 5th(2) | 5th(2) | 3rd(6) | 4th(4) | 7th | DNS | 7th | 5th(2) | 16 |
| 9 | Lawrie Nelson | | DSQ | 2nd(9) | | | 3rd(6) | | | 15 |
| 10 | Bob Morris | | | | | | | 4th(4) | 2nd(9) | 13 |
| 11 | Colin Bond | | | | | | | 2nd(9) | | 9 |
| 11 | Lyndon Arnel | | | | | 5th(9) | | | | 9 |
| 11 | Tony Farrell | | (3) | (6) | | | | | | 9 |
| 14 | John Goss | 3rd(6) | DSQ | Ret | | 5th(2) | Ret | Ret | | 8 |
| 15 | Bill Dickson | | | | 3rd(6) | | | | | 6 |
| 15 | John Stoopman | | 6th(1) | 6th(1) | | | 4th(4) | | | 6 |
| 15 | Tony Watts | 9th(6) | | | | | | | | 6 |
| 15 | Mel McEwin | | | | | | (6) | | | 6 |
| 15 | Paul Gulson | | | | | | | (6) | | 6 |
| 20 | Bryan Thomson | | | 4th(4) | | | | 6th(1) | | 5 |
| 20 | Rod Morris | | | | | | | (2) | (3) | 5 |
| 22 | Bob Jane | 4th(4) | DSQ | | | | | | | 4 |
| 22 | Graham Blanchard | 10th | 4th(4) | 8th | | | | | | 4 |
| 22 | Don Holland | | | | | | | 9th | 4th(4) | 4 |
| 22 | Ian Diffen | 6th(1) | 7th | | 5th(2) | 8th | 6th(1) | 8th | | 4 |
| 22 | John Piper | | (4) | | | | | | | 4 |
| 22 | Rod Miles | | | | (4) | | | | | 4 |
| 22 | Peter Moore | | | | | | (4) | | | 4 |
| 22 | Gary Cooke | | | | | | | (4) | | 4 |
| 22 | Geoff Leeds | | | | | | | | (4) | 4 |
| 31 | Adrian Lewis | | | | (3) | | | | | 3 |
| 31 | Keith McCloy | | | | | (3) | | | | 3 |
| 31 | Nick Munting | | | | | | (3) | | | 3 |
| 31 | Peter Granger | | | | | | | (3) | | 3 |
| 35 | Rod McRae | | DSQ | 5th(2) | | | | | | 2 |
| 35 | Tony Niovanni | | DSQ | 7th | | | 5th(2) | | | 2 |
| 35 | Lakis Manticas | | | | | | | 5th(2) | | 2 |
| 35 | Alf Colledge | | (2) | | | | | | | 2 |
| 35 | Phillip Lyons | | | (2) | | | | | | 2 |
| 35 | Elemer Vajda | | | | (2) | | | | | 2 |
| 35 | Alan Cant | | | | | | | | (2) | 2 |
42
| 42 | John Lewis | | | | 6th(1) | | | | | 1 |
| 42 | Dick Johnson | | | | | 6th(1) | | | | 1 |
| 42 | Ted Mudie | | | | | | | | (1) | 1 |
| | Garry Rowe | | | (1) | | | | | | 1 |
| Pos | Driver | Sym. | Cal. | San. | Wan. | Sur. | Ade. | Ora. | War. | Pts |

| Colour | Result |
|---|---|
| Gold | Winner |
| Silver | Second place |
| Bronze | Third place |
| Green | Points classification |
| Blue | Non-points classification |
| Blue | Non-classified finish (NC) |
| Purple | Retired, not classified (Ret) |
| Red | Did not qualify (DNQ) |
| Red | Did not pre-qualify (DNPQ) |
| Black | Disqualified (DSQ) |
| White | Did not start (DNS) |
| White | Withdrew (WD) |
| White | Race cancelled (C) |
| Blank | Did not practice (DNP) |
| Blank | Did not arrive (DNA) |
| Blank | Excluded (EX) |

Up to and including 2000 cc class competitors
