= Lawrie Nelson =

Australian racing driver (born 1943)

- Nationality: Australian
- Born: Lawrence Leonard Nelson; 8 May 1943 (age 83)
- Wins: 1
- Fastest laps: 0

Lawrence Leonard Nelson (born 8 May 1943) is a former Australian racing driver who raced from 1969 until 2018. Out of over 130 races that he participated in, Nelson won 1 race in 1979 and made the podium in 5 races in 1973 (twice), 1979, 2008 and 2016.

== Complete Australian Touring Car Championship results ==
(key) (Races in bold indicate pole position) (Races in italics indicate fastest lap)

Year	Team	Car	1	2	3	4	5	6	7	8	9	10	11	12	DC	Points
1970	Lawrie Nelson	Holden HK Monaro	CAL; Ret	BAT	SAN	MAL	WAR	LAK	SYM						NC	0
1972	Lawrie Nelson	Chrysler VH Valiant Charger	SYM	CAL	BAT	SAN; 10	AIR	WAR	SUR	ORA					NC	0
1973	Lawrie Nelson	Chrysler Valiant Charger R/T E49	SYM	CAL; DSQ	SAN; 2	WAN	SUR	AIR; 3	ORA	WAR					9th	15
1974	Lawrie Nelson	Chrysler Valiant Charger R/T E49	SYM	CAL; Ret	SAN; 13	AMA	ORA	SUR	AIR						NC	0
1975	Lawrie Nelson	Chrysler Valiant Charger R/T E49	SYM; Ret	CAL; 8	AMA	ORA	SUR	SAN	AIR	LAK					NC	0
1976	Lawrie Nelson	Ford Capri Mk I	SYM	CAL; Ret	ORA	SAN; 10	AMA	AIR; Ret	AIR; 10	LAK	SAN; 8	AIR	SUR	PHI; Ret	12th	18
1977	Lawrie Nelson	Ford Capri Mk I	SYM	CAL	ORA	AMA	SAN	AIR	LAK	SAN	AIR	SUR	PHI		4th	46
1978	Lawrie Nelson	Ford Capri Mk I	SYM	ORA	AMA	SAN	WAN	CAL	LAK	AIR						
1979	Capri Components	Ford Capri Mk I	SYM	CAL; 7	ORA; 16	SAN; 1	WAN	SUR; 14	LAK	AIR						
1980	Capri Components	Ford Capri Mk III	SYM	CAL	LAK	SAN	WAN	SUR	AIR	ORA						
1981	Capri Components	Ford Capri Mk III	SYM	CAL	ORA	SAN	WAN	AIR	SUR	LAK						
1982	Capri Components	Ford Capri Mk III	SAN; 14	SAN; 10	CAL; 8	SYM; Ret	ORA; Ret	LAK	WAN	AIR; 8	SUR				7th	19
1983	Capri Components	Ford Capri Mk III	CAL	SAN	SYM	WAN	AIR	SUR	ORA	LAK						
1984	Capri Components	Ford Capri Mk III	SAN	SYM	WAN	SUR	ORA	LAK	AIR							
1988	Allan Moffat Enterprises	Ford Sierra RS500	CAL	SYM	WIN	WAN; Ret	AIR; 7	LAK; 3	SAN; 4	AMA; 6	ORA; 14			9th	32	
1989	Allan Moffat Enterprises	Ford Sierra RS500	AMA; 7	SYM; Ret	LAK	WAN; Ret	MAL; DSQ	SAN; 7	WIN	ORA; 6				11th	14	
