= Mount Panorama, New South Wales =

Mount Panorama
- Suburb
- Interactive map of Mount Panorama
- Coordinates: 33°26′21″S 149°33′29″E
- Country: Australia
- State: New South Wales
- LGA: Bathurst Region

Government
  - State electorate: Bathurst
  - Federal division: Calare

Population
  - Total: 116 (2016 census)
- Postcode: 2795

Mount Panorama is a suburb of Bathurst, New South Wales, Australia, in the Bathurst Region. The suburb of Mount Panorama is the site of the Mount Panorama Circuit, a street racing track.
