= 1975 Australian Touring Car Championship =

Motor racing competition

Seasons
- ← 1974 1976 →

The 1975 Australian Touring Car Championship was a CAMS sanctioned Australian motor racing title open to Group C Touring Cars. The championship began at Symmons Plains and ended at Lakeside after seven rounds. It was the 16th Australian Touring Car Championship.

The Championship was won by Colin Bond driving a Holden Torana.

The 1975 championship was one of the most controversial in the history of the title with series leader Allan Grice disqualified from the fifth round at Surfers Paradise for a technical infringement. He continued racing under appeal, but the penalty was upheld and Grice lost all points gained from the final three rounds. Reigning champion Peter Brock parted company with the Holden Dealer Team before the series began and raced in a privately funded Holden Torana during the season. Colin Bond, driving a Holden Torana for the Marlboro Holden Dealer Team took victory at the opening round at Symmons Plains Raceway, and end of season wins at Adelaide International Raceway and Lakeside International Raceway saw Bond move past Grice and Bob Morris on points to win the championship. 2000cc class competitor Christine Gibson, driving a factory supported Alfa Romeo 2000 GTV, led the series mid-season after taking four class wins, but had disqualification problems of her own and Bond regained the points advantage by season's end. Gibson's effort however remains to this day (2014) the best performance by a woman in Australian Touring Car Championship history.

== Drivers ==
The following drivers competed in the 1975 Australian Touring Car Championship.

Entrant	No	Car	Driver
Gown-Hindhaugh	1	Holden LH Torana SL/R 5000 L34	Peter Brock
Marlboro Holden Dealer Team	2	Holden LH Torana SL/R 5000 L34	Colin Bond
Ron Dickson	3	Holden LH Torana SL/R 5000 L34	Ron Dickson
Bob Forbes	4	Holden LH Torana SL/R 5000 L34	Bob Forbes
Don Holland	6	Mazda RX-3	Don Holland
Citizen Watches	7	Holden LH Torana SL/R 5000 L34	Bob Morris
Alfa Romeo Dealers Australia	8	Alfa Romeo 2000 GTV	Christine Gibson
Allan Moffat Racing	9	Ford XB Falcon GT Hardtop	Allan Moffat
Dustings of Burwood	9	Holden LH Torana SL/R 5000 L34	Rod McRae
Craven Mild	10	Holden LH Torana SL/R 5000 L34	Allan Grice
Lakis Manticas	11	Mazda RX-3	Lakis Manticas
Bob Jane	12	Holden LH Torana SL/R 5000 L34	Bob Jane
Bob Jane	12	Holden LH Torana SL/R 5000 L34	Frank Gardner
Gene Cooke	13	Holden LH Torana SL/R 5000 L34	Gene Cook
Shell/Bob Holden Motors	14	Ford Escort MkI Twin Cam	Bob Holden
Charlie O'Brien	15	Holden LJ Torana GTR XU-1	Charlie O'Brien
John Stoopman	16	Holden LJ Torana GTR XU-1	John Stoopman
Stuart Saker	17	Holden LJ Torana GTR XU-1	Stuart Saker
Shell/Motorcraft	18	Ford XB Falcon GT Hardtop	Murray Carter
John English	19	Ford Escort MkI Twin Cam	John English
Roadways	20	Holden LH Torana SL/R 5000 L34	Garth Wigston
Kevin Kennedy	21	Holden LJ Torana GTR XU-1	Kevin Kennedy
Rotary Rebuild	22	Mazda RX-3	Craig Bradtke
Alfa Romeo Dealers Australia	24	Alfa Romeo 2000 GTV	John French
Barry Sheales Holden	27	Holden LH Torana SL/R 5000 L34	Kelvin Gough
Retell Ford Mentone	28	Ford XB Falcon GT Hardtop	Ray Allford
Bernie Haehnle	30	Mazda RX-3	Bernie Haehnle
Barry Seton	31	Ford Capri V6	Barry Seton
Lawrie Nelson	32	Chrysler Valiant Charger R/T E49	Lawrie Nelson
Murray Coote	37	Datsun 1200	Murray Coote
Leichhardt Auto Port	39	Holden LH Torana SL/R 5000 L34	Phil Arnull
Rod Morris	40	Fiat 128 Coupe	Rod Morris
Tony Mulvihill	41	Mazda RX-3	Tony Mulvihill
Ray Gulson	42	Alfa Romeo 2000 GTV	Ray Gulson
Peter Brown	44	Alfa Romeo 2000 GTV	Peter Brown
Jim Keogh	45	Ford XB Falcon GT Hardtop	Jim Keogh
Bob Anderson	46	Holden LH Torana SL/R 5000 L34	Bob Anderson
Shell/Bob Holden Motors	48	Ford Escort MkI Twin Cam	Lyndon Arnel
Brian Ovenden	49	Chrysler Valiant Charger R/T E49	Brian Ovenden
Barry Nelson	50	Holden LJ Torana GTR XU-1	Barry Nelson
John Wharton	51	Mazda RX-3	John Wharton
Norm Gown	52	Holden LH Torana SL/R 5000 L34	Norm Gown
Ian Wells	53	Honda Civic	Ian Wells
Dick Johnson	55	Holden LJ Torana GTR XU-1	Dick Johnson
Bernie McClure	58	Holden LH Torana SL/R 5000 L34	Bernie McClure
Milton Leslight	61	Holden LJ Torana GTR XU-1	Milton Leslight
Tony Watts	64	Morris Cooper S	Tony Watts
Ian White	65	Ford Escort MkI Twin Cam	Ian White
John Duggan	66	Mazda RX-3	John Duggan
Peter Williamson	70	BMW 2002tii	Peter Williamson
Alan Welling	71	Holden LJ Torana GTR XU-1	Alan Welling
Colin Campbell	72	Ford Escort MkI Twin Cam	Colin Campbell
Brian Power	73	Datsun 1200	Brian Power
Graeme Adams	74	Holden LJ Torana GTR XU-1	Graeme Adams
Robert Armstrong	75	Holden LJ Torana GTR XU-1	Robert Armstrong
Jack Thompson	76	Mini Clubman	Jack Thompson
Neville Bridges	77	Holden LH Torana SL/R 5000 L34	Neville Bridges
Wayne Mahnken	79	Holden LJ Torana GTR XU-1	Wayne Mahnken
Graeme Blanchard	81	Holden LH Torana SL/R 5000 L34	Graeme Blanchard
Keith Shaw	88	Honda Civic	Keith Shaw
Tom Heffernan	89	Holden LJ Torana GTR XU-1	Tom Heffernan
Ian Shields	90	Holden LJ Torana GTR XU-1	Ian Shields
Peter LeFrancke	92	Toyota Corolla	Peter LeFrancke
Terry Daly	93	Ford Escort MkI Twin Cam	Terry Daly
John Pooley	94	Volkswagen Passat TS	John Pooley
Warren Scott	95	Toyota Corolla	Warren Scott
Roamer Watches Australia	97	Holden LH Torana SL/R 5000 L34	Ray Kaleda
Harry Stephenson	98	Holden LH Torana SL/R 5000 L34	Harry Stephenson
Barry Nixon-Smith	99	Holden LJ Torana GTR XU-1	Barry Nixon-Smith
Russell Worthington	100	Mazda RX-2	Russell Worthington
Chris Beards	101	Toyota Corolla	Chris Beards
David Caswell	102	Honda Civic	David Caswell
Eric Olsen	103	Ford Escort MkI Twin Cam	Eric Olsen
Graham Parsons	125	Holden LH Torana SL/R 5000 L34	Graham Parsons

Up to 2000cc class competitor

== Calendar ==
The 1975 Australian Touring Car Championship was contested over a seven-round series with one race per round.

Rd.	Event title	Circuit	Location / state	Winner	Car	Team	Date
1	Symmons Plains	Symmons Plains Raceway	Launceston, Tasmania	Colin Bond	Holden LH Torana SL/R 5000 L34	Marlboro Holden Dealer Team	03/03/1975
2	Calder	Calder Park Raceway	Melbourne, Victoria	Allan Grice	Holden LH Torana SL/R 5000 L34	Craven Mild Racing	16/03/1975
3	Amaroo Park	Amaroo Park	Sydney, New South Wales	Bob Morris	Holden LH Torana SL/R 5000 L34	Ron Hodgson Motors	30/03/1975
4	Oran Park	Oran Park Raceway	Sydney, New South Wales	Allan Grice	Holden LH Torana SL/R 5000 L34	Craven Mild Racing	27/04/1975
5	Surfers Paradise	Surfers Paradise International Raceway	Surfers Paradise, Queensland	Bob Morris	Holden LH Torana SL/R 5000 L34	Ron Hodgson Motors	18/05/1975
6	Sandown	Sandown Raceway	Melbourne, Victoria	cancelled			
7	Adelaide	Adelaide International Raceway	Virginia, South Australia	Colin Bond	Holden LH Torana SL/R 5000 L34	Marlboro Holden Dealer Team	08/06/1975
8	Lakeside	Lakeside International Raceway	Brisbane, Queensland	Colin Bond	Holden LH Torana SL/R 5000 L34	Marlboro Holden Dealer Team	29/06/1975

== Classes ==
Cars competed in two classes:

- Up to and including 2000cc
- Over 2000cc

== Points system ==
Championship points were awarded on a 9–6–4–3–2–1 basis for the first six positions in each class at each round. Bonus points were awarded on a 4–3–2–1 basis for the first four outright positions at each round.

== Championship results ==
Pos.	Driver	Car	Rd 1	Rd 2	Rd 3	Rd 4	Rd 5	Rd 6	Rd 7	Rd 8	Total
1	Colin Bond	Holden Torana SL/R 5000 L34	1st(13)	3rd(6)	Ret	2nd(9)	3rd(6)		1st(13)	1st(13)	60
2	Murray Carter	Ford Falcon XB GT	2nd(9)	4th(4)	3rd(6)	3rd(6)	4th(4)		2nd(9)	3rd(6)	44
3	Allan Grice	Holden Torana SL/R 5000 L34	4th(4)	1st(13)	2nd(9)	1st(13)	DSQ		DSQ	DSQ	39
3	Bob Holden	Ford Escort Twin Cam; Ford Escort RS2000	(4)	(6)	(6)	(3)	(2)		(9)	(9)	39
5	Christine Gibson	Alfa Romeo 2000 GTV		(9)	(9)	(9)	(9)		DSQ		36
6	Bob Morris	Holden Torana SL/R 5000 L34	3rd(6)	Ret	1st(13)	Ret	1st(13)		Ret		32
7	Peter Brock	Holden Torana SL/R 5000 L34	Ret	2nd(9)	Ret	Ret	2nd(9)		Ret	2nd(9)	27
8	Ray Gulson	Alfa Romeo 2000 GTV	(9)	(3)	(2)	(2)	(3)		(6)		25
9	John French	Alfa Romeo 2000 GTV		(6)	Ret	(9)	Ret		DSQ		10
9	Peter Williamson	BMW 2002 Ti				(6)	(9)				10
9	Craig Bradtke	Mazda RX-3	(6)	(2)	(1)		(1)				10
12	Bob Forbes	Holden Torana SL/R 5000 L34			4th(4)	4th(4)					8
13	Rod McRae	Holden Torana SL/R 5000 L34		6th(1)		5th(2)			4th(4)		7
14	Kel Gough	Holden Torana SL/R 5000 L34							3rd(6)		6
14	Lyndon Arnel	Ford Escort Twin Cam								(6)	6
16	Ian White	Ford Escort Twin Cam			(4)					(1)	5
17	Rod Anderson	Holden LJ Torana GTR XU-1								4th(4)	4
17	John Stoopman	Holden LJ Torana GTR XU-1		5th(2)		6th(1)			6th(1)		4
17	Peter Brown	Alfa Romeo 2000 GTV			(4)						4
17	John Wharton	Mazda RX-3					(4)				4
17	Brian Power	Datsun 1200								(4)	4
22	Peter Lefranke	Toyota Corolla								(3)	3
23	Allan Moffat	Ford Falcon XB GT	5th(2)								2
23	Barry Nixon-Smith	Holden LJ Torana GTR XU-1			5th(2)						2
23	Dick Johnson	Holden LJ Torana GTR XU-1					5th(2)				2
23	Graham Blanchard	Holden Torana SL/R 5000 L34							5th(2)		2
23	Neville Bridges	Holden Torana GTR								5th(2)	2
28	Garth Wigston	Holden Torana SL/R 5000 L34	6th(1)								1
28	Charlie O'Brien	Holden LJ Torana GTR XU-1					6th(1)				1
28	Tom Heffernan	Holden Torana GTR								6th(1)	1
28	Lakis Manticas	Mazda RX-3			6th(1)						1
28	Rod Morris	Fiat 128 Coupe				6th(1)					1
28	Eric Olsen	Ford Escort Twin Cam								6th(1)	1
Pos	Driver	Car	Rd 1	Rd 2	Rd 3	Rd 4	Rd 5	Rd 6	Rd 7	Rd 8	Pts

Colour	Result
Gold	Winner
Silver	Second place
Bronze	Third place
Green	Points classification
Blue	Non-points classification
Blue	Non-classified finish (NC)
Purple	Retired, not classified (Ret)
Red	Did not qualify (DNQ)
Red	Did not pre-qualify (DNPQ)
Black	Disqualified (DSQ)
White	Did not start (DNS)
White	Withdrew (WD)
White	Race cancelled (C)
Blank	Did not practice (DNP)
Blank	Did not arrive (DNA)
Blank	Excluded (EX)

Up to 2000cc class competitor
