= Holden Dealer Team =

Australian auto racing team

- Manufacturer: Holden
- Team Principal: Harry Firth (1969–77); John Sheppard (1978–79); Peter Brock (1980–90)
- Team Manager: Harry Firth (1969–77); John Sheppard (1978–79); Peter Brock (1980–81); Grant Steers (1982–86); Alan Gow (1987–90)
- Race Drivers: (Notable) Peter Brock, Colin Bond, John Harvey, Larry Perkins, David Parsons, Jim Richards, Allan Moffat, Vern Schuppan
- Chassis: Holden Monaro (HT); Holden Torana (LC, LJ, LH, LX); Holden Commodore (VB, VC, VH, VK, VK SS Group A, VL); BMW M3; Ford Sierra RS500
- Debut: 1969
- Drivers' Championships: 4
- Round wins: 38
- 2nd (Brock), 12th (Miedecke)

The Holden Dealer Team (HDT) was Holden's semi-official racing team from 1969 until 1986, primarily contesting Australian Touring Car events but also rallying, rallycross and Sports Sedan races during the 1970s. From 1980 the Holden Dealer Team, by then under the ownership of Peter Brock, diversified into producing modified road-going Commodores and other Holden cars for selected dealers via HDT Special Vehicles.

After Holden terminated its association with Brock's businesses in February 1987, the team became the factory BMW team racing M3s race team in 1988. Further into 1988, Brock sold off his HDT Special Vehicles road car business, and under various ownership continued to modify Holden vehicles.

== History ==
=== Early years ===
After showing an increasing interest in motorsport during the 1960s, Holden decided to form a team to enter both Touring Car and Rally events in 1969. However, Holden's parent company, General Motors forbade its manufacturers from officially entering motor sport circuit racing events worldwide. Holden was able to circumvent this directive by naming its team the ‘Holden Dealer Team’ which was officially owned by its dealers. In reality Holden bankrolled the entire operation and Holden executive John Bagshaw, who was the driving force behind the establishment of the team, created the financial framework which allowed the HDT to be funded without Detroit's knowledge. Holden appointed former Ford Works Team manager Harry Firth to run the operation.

The Holden Dealer Team's race debut was made at the 1969 Sandown 3 Hour. A single Holden Monaro GTS350 was entered for Kevin Bartlett and Spencer Martin, the car retiring after suffering brake problems, crashing and catching fire.

Harry Firth hired six drivers to contest the 1969 Hardie-Ferodo 500 for the Holden Dealer Team including two talented, but relatively untested, drivers in Colin Bond and Peter Brock. These two would form the backbone of the team over the next few years. The team's three HT Monaro GTS350’s tasted success, finishing first and third, with Bond winning with co-driver Tony Roberts, while Brock finished third with Des West.

Concerned at the ongoing development of rival Ford's V8 powered XW Falcon GTHO Phase I, in 1970 Firth opted to run a much smaller race car based upon the Holden Torana with a 6-cylinder engine. The LC Torana GTR XU-1 was a match for the larger and more powerful Falcon GT-HO at most circuits, but at Bathurst, with its long straight and steep 'mountain' climb, the car was less competitive, and Ford's Allan Moffat dominated both the 1970 and 1971 Bathurst events. However, in the wet 1972 Hardie-Ferodo 500 the Holden Dealer Team with its LJ Torana GTR XU-1 broke through Ford's domination, with Peter Brock winning the first of his nine Bathurst victories in a solo drive in the last of Bathurst's 500-mile Series Production race formats During Firth's time at HDT Brock had his day winning Bathurst in 1975 on a dry track in his No. 05 Holden L34. This was a win for HDT as well for they masterminded the fastest Holden ever built, the L34. The HDT developed L34 got 1st, 2nd, and 3rd that year and the first 7 places in 1976. Never had Holden been so dominant at the mountain. The A9X used the L34 motor for its victories as well as the HDT Commodores. The big brake light car concept brought about by Firth with high-performance small motor dominated Holden's thinking moving from the cumbersome Kingswoods to the Torana-like fleet of foot Commodore of the eighties.

==== Rallying and Rallycross ====
Holden had been supporting rally adventures since the early 1960s and had made use of the brand's successes in its advertising ... support had often been arranged via dedicated state 'dealer' teams, however, it was not until 1969 that the whole arena of rallying and Holden motorsport, in general, was grouped together under the management of Harry Firth and the Holden Dealer Team. The new team kicked off in August 1969 with Harry himself behind the wheel of an HT Monaro GTS 253 rally car, but he soon after announced his retirement from active driving, handing over the rally Monaro to his old rival, Barry Ferguson. Colin Bond and Tony Roberts, both of whom had considerable previous rallying experience, then joined in as additional members of the rally team.

In 1970, the rally team ran a Monaro GTS 350 for Bond whilst Ferguson and Roberts each drove the new Torana GTRs. As the team progressed, Colin Bond in partnership with George Shepheard won the Australian Rally Championship three times in 1971, 1972 and 1974 driving the LC Torana GTR XU-1 and later the LJ Torana GTR XU-1 while team mates Peter Lang and Warwick Smith won in 1973 making for four consecutive titles for the HDT. During this period, Peter Brock proved himself to be very successful in Rallycross races at Calder Park Raceway in Victoria, Catalina Park in New South Wales and in Mallala in South Australia, driving HDT's famous Holden Torana GTR called "The Beast". In Brock's hands this supercharged version of a LC Torana GTR proved virtually unbeatable. At the time Brock was sweeping all before him in Rallycross, young team mechanic, test driver and sometime race driver Larry Perkins also raced Rallycross with the HDT with some success.

==== LJ Torana GTR XU-1 V8 ====
In 1972, Harry Firth began developing a V8-engined version of the LJ Torana GTR XU-1, to be able to compete with Ford's anticipated XA Falcon GT-HO (Phase IV) and Chrysler's mooted 340 cui V8 Charger at Bathurst (Chrysler continue to this day to say that the Charger R/T V8 was a myth and that their intention was to continue with the 265 cui Hemi-6, but Ford's GT-HO Phase IV was no myth as 4 examples were built with two surviving as of 2015). The first V8 Torana was fitted with the small block 253 cui (4.2L) V8, but this was soon upgraded to the 308 cui (5.0L) version. This car was built to Series Production rules at the time but Harry Firth had Colin Bond race the car, disguised as a Sports Sedan, at the 1972 Easter ATCC race meeting at Bathurst. Bond took an easy victory in the five lap support race with a lap time some four seconds faster than the team's 6-cylinder Series car ran on the same day. Production plans were terminated following the 'Supercar scare' of June/July 1972.

The road handling of the V8 XU-1 remains a contentious point. While Firth maintained until his death in 2014 (at the age of 96) that the V8 actually handled better than the 6 cyl XU-1, his rival at the Ford Works Team, Howard Marsden, believed that the V8 would have brake issues due to its greater speed, as well as other handling problems (with Firth making a similar counter-claim about the Phase IV). While Firth continually dismissed this, Marsden's claims were later backed up by Peter Brock who also raced the car in sports sedans. Brock claimed that while the V8 was faster in a straight line, its handling was in fact terrible due to the extra weight and that the XU-1's chassis was never built to take the greater torque of the V8 engine. Brock also told that the first time both he and Colin Bond used full acceleration in the car in testing, the greater torque of the V8 actually cracked the windscreen.

Of the four V8 XU-1 prototypes built, none survived as Holden crashed them in an effort to re-coup the costs involved in its development. Firth claimed that he personally lost some A$55,000 of his own money on the cars with the HDT carrying out almost all of the development work.

==== LH Torana SL/R 5000 L34 and LX Torana A9X ====
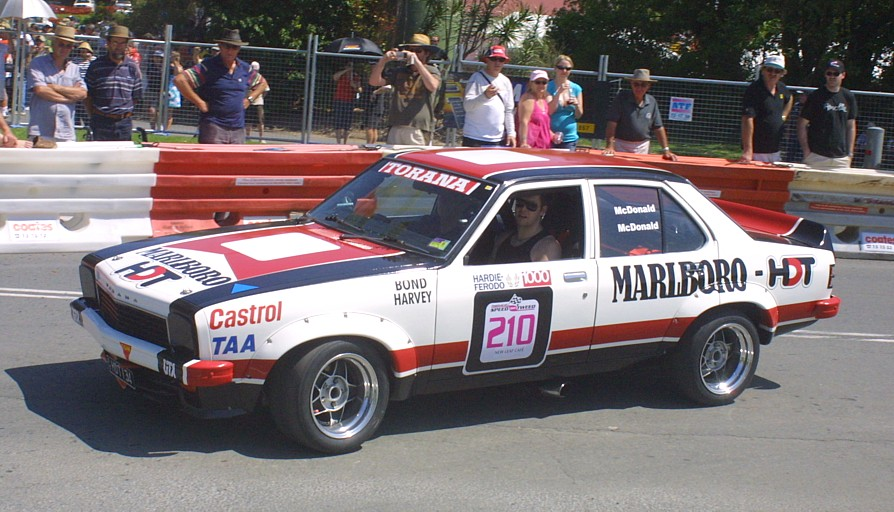
Replica of the 1976 Bathurst HDT Bond/Harvey Torana L34

In 1974 Holden was able to keep the V8 engine eligible for racing when it released the larger, but significantly more powerful LH Torana SL/R 5000. Peter Brock dominated the Australian Touring Car Championship that year, using both a LJ-series GTR XU-1 and then the new LH-series SL/R 5000. Both Brock and Bond suffered engine problems with the new L34 version of the SL/R 5000 at the Sandown 250 and the Bathurst 1000 in 1974. Engine problems put the Brock/Sampson car out on lap 118 of the Bathurst race when it was six laps in front, while the Bond/Bob Skelton car was black flagged for an oil leak which lost the car time and they eventually finished in fourth place. Despite these failures in the two high-profile endurance races for the year, Holden, thanks largely to the Dealer Team, did win the 1974 Australian Manufacturers' Championship after Bond had won Round 1 in Adelaide (Chesterfield 250), Round 4 at Surfers Paradise (Chesterfield 300) and the final round at Phillip Island (Repco 500K).

1974 also saw Dick Johnson make his one and only start for the HDT when he drove the team's spare LJ GTR XU-1 Torana (#2) in Round 6 of the ATCC at Surfers Paradise on 19 May. Johnson, who in the 1980s would become a Ford folk hero and one of the Dealer Team's chief rivals, finished third in the race won by Brock with Bob Morris finishing second.

At the end of the 1974 season Brock left the HDT team, whilst Colin Bond continued on as the team's sole circuit racing driver. The L34 option was homologated for racing in 1975 which cured the V8's oil surge problems and Bond went on to win the 1975 Australian Touring Car Championship whilst also competing in rally events for HDT in a LH Torana SL/R 5000 L34. While the L34 solved the engine problems, the Torana still had one major weak spot in that the axles on the car were easily broken. In later years drivers such as Bond, Brock, Bob Morris and Allan Grice would all tell how carefully they had to drive the cars in order for them to finish races.

HDT's circuit racing presence returned to a two-car status for 1976, initially with South Australian Formula 5000 driver Johnnie Walker joining the team, but following his departure along came former speedway and open wheel driver John Harvey who would remain with the team until its split from Holden in early 1987. In 1977, Colin Bond departed HDT to join Allan Moffat's semi-works "Moffat Ford Dealers" team where he went on to finish second behind Moffat in both the ATCC and at Bathurst that year. In 1977, John Harvey became the HDT's principal driver with young Queenslander Charlie O'Brien signed to drive the team's second car.

The 1977 touring car racing season also saw the debut of the LX Torana, the new A9X performance option replacing the L34 version and available in both four-door "SL/R 5000" sedan and two-door "SS 5.0" hatchback body types. Other than the hatchback body, the most visual difference between the L34 and the A9X was that the A9X had a rear-facing bonnet scoop designed to feed cool air to the engine resulting in more horsepower. However, due to teething troubles with this new homologation special, the Holden Dealer Team struggled against the two-car Moffat Ford Dealers team, with Allan Moffat winning both the 1977 ATCC title and also the big one, the Hardie-Ferodo 1000 at Bathurst, though Peter Brock, driving for former racer and Melbourne Holden dealer Bill Patterson, gave the A9X Hatchback a dream racing debut when his privately entered car won the 1977 Hang Ten 400 at Sandown Park.

After a solid eight years as team manager of the HDT, and a 29-year career in motor racing that had begun with preparing the 1948 Australian Grand Prix winning BMW 328 for Frank Pratt, 59-year-old Harry Firth retired at the end of the 1977 season. He later told how he had become increasingly frustrated that Holden weren't listening to his advice on what was needed to be successful in Australian touring car racing. Firth would go on to be the chief CAMS scrutineer for touring cars from 1978 to 1981 alongside Frank Lowndes, the father of Craig Lowndes.

==== Sports Sedans ====
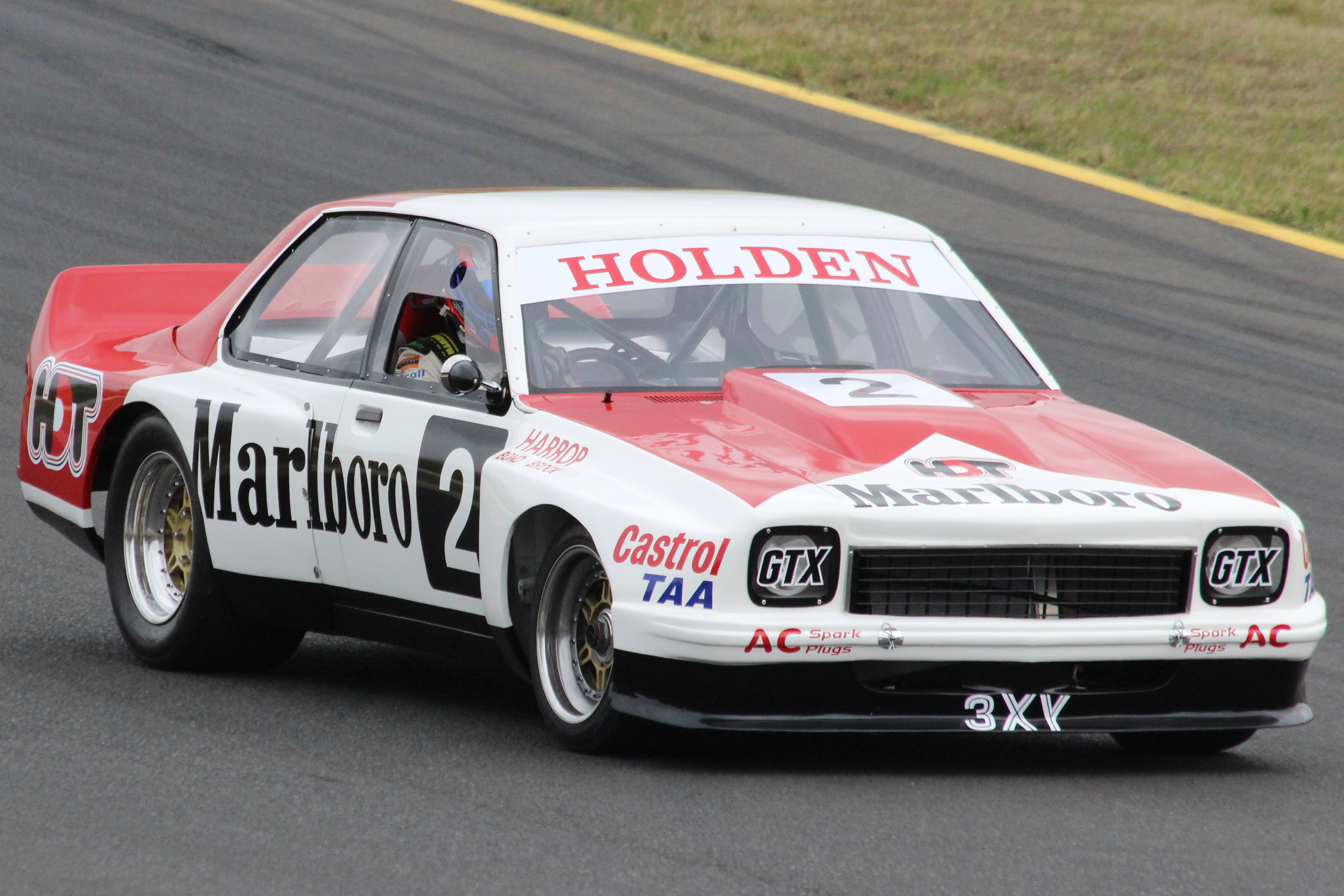
The LH Torana Sports Sedan, pictured in 2015.

The Holden Dealer Team debuted a Sports Sedan in 1973, the car using a Repco Holden Formula 5000 engine in a Holden LJ Torana body. The car was driven by Colin Bond and Peter Brock.

The 1976 season saw Bond (who continued to live in Sydney despite the team being based in Melbourne), and his mechanics build a lightweight LH Torana Sports Sedan powered by a Formula 5000 sourced Repco-Holden V8 engine to race in the inaugural Australian Sports Sedan Championship. Due to a quirk in the rules for Sports Sedan racing in Australia, the Torana was restricted to an engine size of just 5.0 litres, while its main opposition (Ian Geoghegan and Bob Jane in their HQ Monaro GTS 350's, Allan Moffat's Chevrolet Monza and the Ford Mustang of New Zealand's Jim Richards) were all allowed to run engines up to 6.0 L in capacity. The rule was that cars which had engines of no more than 5.0 L in road going form could only race with a maximum capacity engine of 5.0 L. As the largest engine in the Torana road car range was the 5.0 L 308 V8 engine, this restricted the Torana to using a 5.0 L engine. Bond and his team in Sydney paid for the build costs of the car but ran it under the HDT banner and painted it in the team's Marlboro sponsors colours, though as he told in Australian Muscle Car magazine in 2015, Harry Firth had done a deal with the various track promoters around the country which paid him appearance money for the car but meant there was very little (if any) prize money left over for Bond. The car only appeared in two rounds of the seven round series, qualifying on pole at Sandown (1.1 seconds faster than Geoghegan despite a power disadvantage on what was a known power circuit), before finishing 3rd behind Moffat and Geoghegan in both heats, and again finishing 3rd in the next round at Oran Park. Despite this, Bond finished equal sixth in the series with Geoghegan.

After Bond left the team at the end of 1976 to join Allan Moffat Racing, the Torana was brought to Melbourne where driver/engineer Ron Harrop was given the job of preparing and driving the car. Harrop changed a few things on the car, which from 1977 was re-painted to mirror the look of the team's touring cars. He would drive the Torana in various events throughout 1977 and into 1978, though it was Peter Brock who last drove it for the team at Melbourne's Calder Park in mid-1978 before it was sold.

The Torana ended up in the hands of Casino sports sedan racer Geoff Russell who campaigned the car in the Australian Sports Sedan Championship as well as sports sedan races at Sydney's tight Amaroo Park circuit. Russell later sold the Torana to fellow Sydney racer Des Wall who retained the car until his death. The Torana is currently owned by Des' racer son David Wall who by 2015 had fully restored the car to its 1977 specification and livery.

=== John Sheppard take over ===
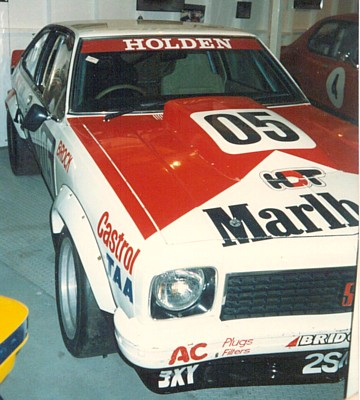
The 1979 Bathurst 1000 winning Torana

John Sheppard took over as HDT team manager following Firth's retirement and one of his first moves was to bring Peter Brock back to the team. Holden had originally wanted to bring Brock back in 1976, though Harry Firth had vetoed the move when he found that Holden were allegedly willing to pay Brock A$40,000 which Firth claimed was twice as much as what he was being paid as team manager. It was a wise decision by Sheppard for Brock dominated the season, becoming the first driver to win the 'triple crown' of the Touring Car Championship, the Hang Ten 400 at Sandown and the Hardie-Ferodo 1000 (with Jim Richards) at Bathurst. He was initially given the team's 4-Door A9X to drive in the opening round at Sandown while John Harvey drove the only Hatchback available at the time. Brock was given a new hatchback Torana to drive for the rest of the season.

Soon after Sheppard took over the team in 1978, the HDT was forced to re-build their new A9X Toranas as CAMS new chief scrutineer Harry Firth refused to pass them for racing. When Sheppard protested that the rules had not changed and that the cars were actually the 1977 cars built by the team when Firth was the boss, Harry waved off the protest as he knew what he had done with the cars and knew they were not legal.

Brock was narrowly defeated by privateer Torana driver Bob Morris for the 1979 Australian Touring Car Championship, but went on to dominate the Hardie-Ferodo 1000. Brock qualified on pole position, he and Richards lead every lap of the race, Brock set a new lap record on the very last lap of the race (which would not be broken until 1982) and they won by a massive six-lap margin. Brock's pole time of 2:20.500 was also 1.966-second faster than Morris who was second on the grid.

Before Bathurst, the Holden Dealer Team also entered a three-car Commodore team in the 20,000 km Repco Round Australia Trial which started and finished at the Royal Melbourne Showgrounds and travelled clockwise around the country over some of the most inhospitable terrain imaginable. The team used the VB model Commodore which were powered by the 3.3L (202 cui), 6 cyl Holden Red motor previously used in the XU-1 Toranas (the six was chosen over the more powerful V8 due to their much lighter weight). Anxious to prove the then new cars reliability, the cars were perfectly prepared and finished first, second and third. Brock, who won the event along with co-drivers Matt Phillip and Noel Richards, has cited this event as his career highlight as it was an event in which many motor racing experts throughout Australia, as well as the media, did not believe he would do well in despite his previous rally and rallycross exploits.

=== Peter Brock era ===
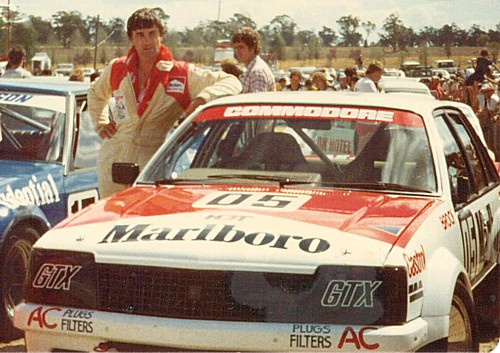
Brock at Symmons Plains 1982

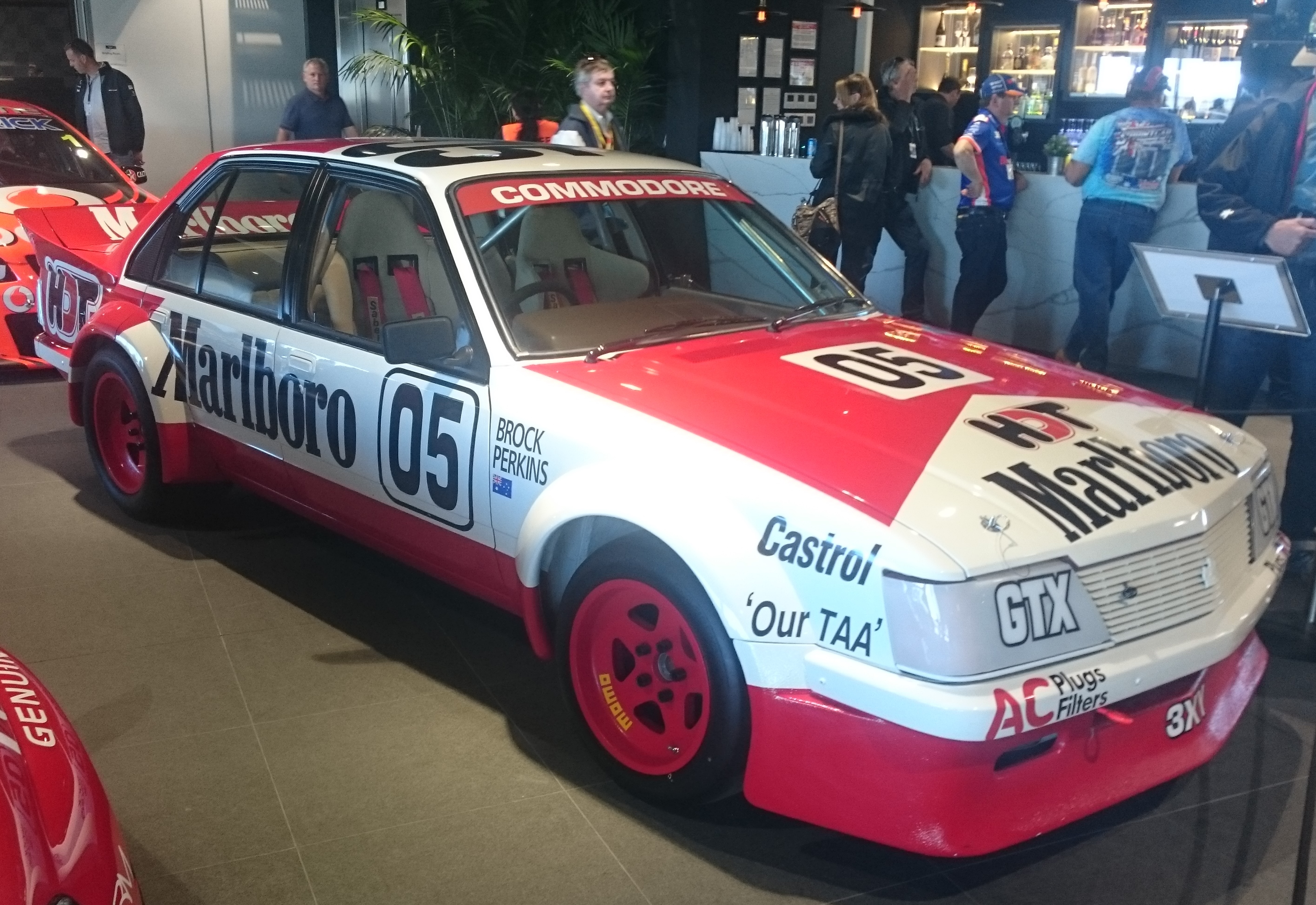
The Holden Dealer Team contested Australian Group C Touring Car races in 1983 with the Holden Commodore VH model

Despite the success, by 1980 Holden was ready to pull the pin on the Dealer Team. Holden believed that since Ford had pulled out of touring car racing at the end of 1978, there was no longer any point in competing against privateer teams driving Holden cars, and they put the team up for sale. As a result of Holden quitting, John Sheppard also quit as team boss and Vin Kean purchased the team, and financed it. He called on Holden dealers to support him, with the major support coming from Vin Kean in Adelaide who could see a market for "hotter" versions of the road-going Commodore. In return for providing assistance, Vin would build a special range of modified, high performance Commodores at his Richmond Road Adelaide premises and provided them for the dealers to add to their range, though the cars were only available through the 54 other dealers around Australia who had agreed to help Vin Kean finance the operation. For the first time, the team really was a 'Dealer Team' rather than a back-door factory team. While Vin was the boss of both the race team and the Special Vehicles operation, he hired Peter Brock to be the front man HDT driver John Harvey as the Special Vehicles workshop manager. Vin Kean was also able to keep the team's sponsors on board including major sponsor Marlboro and minor sponsors Castrol, AC Plugs & Filters, Bridgestone and TAA Airlines. According to Vin he and the team went to the first round of the 1980 ATCC at Symmons Plains in Tasmania with no major sponsor. The car was painted in Marlboro colours, but Marlboro's parent company Philip Morris International had yet to commit to the new team. Brock ran the new VB Commodore with the sponsors signs on the premise of showing them that the team would carry on its winning ways of the 1970s and after claiming pole and scoring a dominant win at Symmons, Phillip Morris committed to the deal.

Despite the off track changes, the Holden Dealer Team remained as competitive as ever in 1980, with Brock claiming his second and last 'triple crown'. During the final months of 1979 the team had been secretly testing and developing a VB Commodore with a view to the new rules of 1980. This led to a situation where Brock and the HDT virtually had the only race ready car for the start of the 1980 ATCC, which had to conform to CAMS new engine emission regulations which meant the Toranas and Falcons of previous years were out (or had to be significantly modified, running drum brakes on the rear wheels instead of 4 wheel discs and the "low emission" engine heads which produced less power), and the new Commodore and XD Falcon model were in. Other cars had come on during the year, namely the new European style Falcon and the American Chevrolet Camaro Z28 with its powerful 5.7-litre V8. This time the HDT's Bathurst adventure was less straightforward. After only qualifying 3rd behind the Camaro of Kevin Bartlett and Falcon of Dick Johnson (the first time all year the No. 05 Commodore did not claim pole position), Brock chased Johnson's XD Falcon early in the race. Then on lap 15 Brock collided with a small class Isuzu Gemini on top of the mountain causing an unscheduled pit stop. The damage was only minor but Brock went a lap down soon after leaving the pits and rejoining the track. Within half a lap however, Johnson hit a rock on the top of the mountain and was out of the race, and Brock and Jim Richards fought their way back and by the end of Brock's extended opening stint he was back in the lead and they went on to score their 3rd straight win (and Brock's 5th) while team mates John Harvey and driver/engineer Ron Harrop failed to finish after engine failure. Ironically, Harvey's engine blew just as Channel 7's camera's were following the No. 25 car across the top of The Mountain with commentator Mike Raymond praising the HDT's reliability record. Brock's extended opening stint of the race would later mean Richards actually took the chequered flag. It would be the only time Brock would not do so in his 9 Bathurst victories.

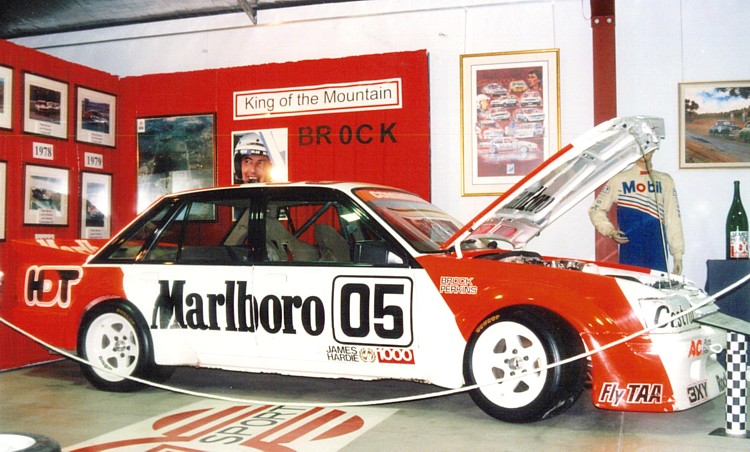
The 1984 Bathurst 1000 winning Brock/Perkins Holden VK Commodore

While the Holden Dealer Team was unable to win another Touring Car Championship, the team maintained its excellent Bathurst record over the next few years. Brock won Bathurst again in 1982 with former Formula One driver Larry Perkins who had been a mechanic/driver with the HDT in the early 1970s under Harry Firth before embarking on a career in Europe until returning home in 1977. Perkins was hired by Brock in 1982 to prepare the race cars and co-drive with the boss in the endurance races. The HDT again won Bathurst in 1983, though it was under somewhat controversial circumstances. The rules at the time permitted 'cross-entering' which meant that after Brock's pole winning car dropped out on only lap 8 with an engine failure, both Brock and Perkins transferred into John Harvey's car, leaving Peter's younger brother Phil, who was to be Harvey's co-driver, without a drive. The trio then went on to win the race in what was actually the 1982 race winning VH Commodore SS. The controversy was that although the rules permitted drivers cross-entering in other cars and indeed this had actually been seen previously, it was the first time that car swapping had resulted in winning the race. For 1984, which was the last year for CAMS locally developed Group C touring car regulations, Brock and Perkins made it three in a row and the team made it a 1–2 the No. 25 car of John Harvey and new recruit David Parsons (who was in the car at the finish) crossed the line right behind, but 2 laps back, Brock in a form finish.

During 1984, members of the Holden Dealer Team, including drivers Bathurst winning co-drivers Brock and Perkins, launched an assault on the 1984 24 Hours of Le Mans in France driving a 400 km/h (249 mph), 650 bhp (485 kW; 659 PS) Porsche 956B supplied by 1976 Bathurst winner John Fitzpatrick and sponsored by former ATCC and Bathurst champion, retail tyre entrepreneur Bob Jane. Running under the name of "Team Australia", the team also ran in the lead up race to the event, the 1000 km race at the Silverstone Circuit in England where they finished 22nd (second last) after losing a lot of time in the pits early in the race repairing a broken rear upright. At Le Mans Perkins qualified the Porsche in 15th position. As a former Formula 1 driver, Perkins was the name driver as far as the sports car and formula racing oriented European motoring press were concerned. In a complete reversal of the situation in Australia, Brock was regarded by the media merely as a saloon car driver from the Antipodes who was along for the ride. Perkins started the race and along with Brock had the car up to 5th place after a few hours before being forced to spend some 45 minutes in the pits after the car lost a wheel during Brock's second stint, putting them out of winning contention. The team fought back and were still hopeful of a respectable finish when their race came to an end at just before 2 am after Perkins crashed the car in the Esses after a clash with the Brun Motorsport Porsche 956 of Massimo Sigala while trying to make up lost ground, the resulting damage put an end to Team Australia's race. Ironically, Perkins had clashed with the same 956 during practice, but the car was undamaged on that occasion.

After returning from Le Mans, the team had built two new VK model Commodore's for the end of season Australian Endurance Championship races and the Group C support race at the Australian Grand Prix at Calder. The cars were painted in Marlboro's "day-glo" colours and were regarded as the best looking of the Dealer Team's Commodores. Brock had noticed the Marlboro day-glo paint scheme on one of the rival Porsche 956's at Silverstone and had decided at that point that the HDT would use that same paint scheme on the Bathurst Commodores. Brock's own No. 05 won three of the four races it was entered in, the wins being the Castrol 500 at Sandown, the James Hardie 1000 and the Motorcraft 300 at Surfers Paradise.

While it has been widely reported that the No. 05 VK Commodore was undefeated in Brock's hands, this is actually untrue. The car did finish first in all three Endurance Championship races it competed in, however Brock's fourth and last race in the car saw him finish second to the factory backed Nissan Bluebird Turbo of George Fury in the support race for the 1984 Australian Grand Prix at Calder Park in Melbourne.

==== Group A ====
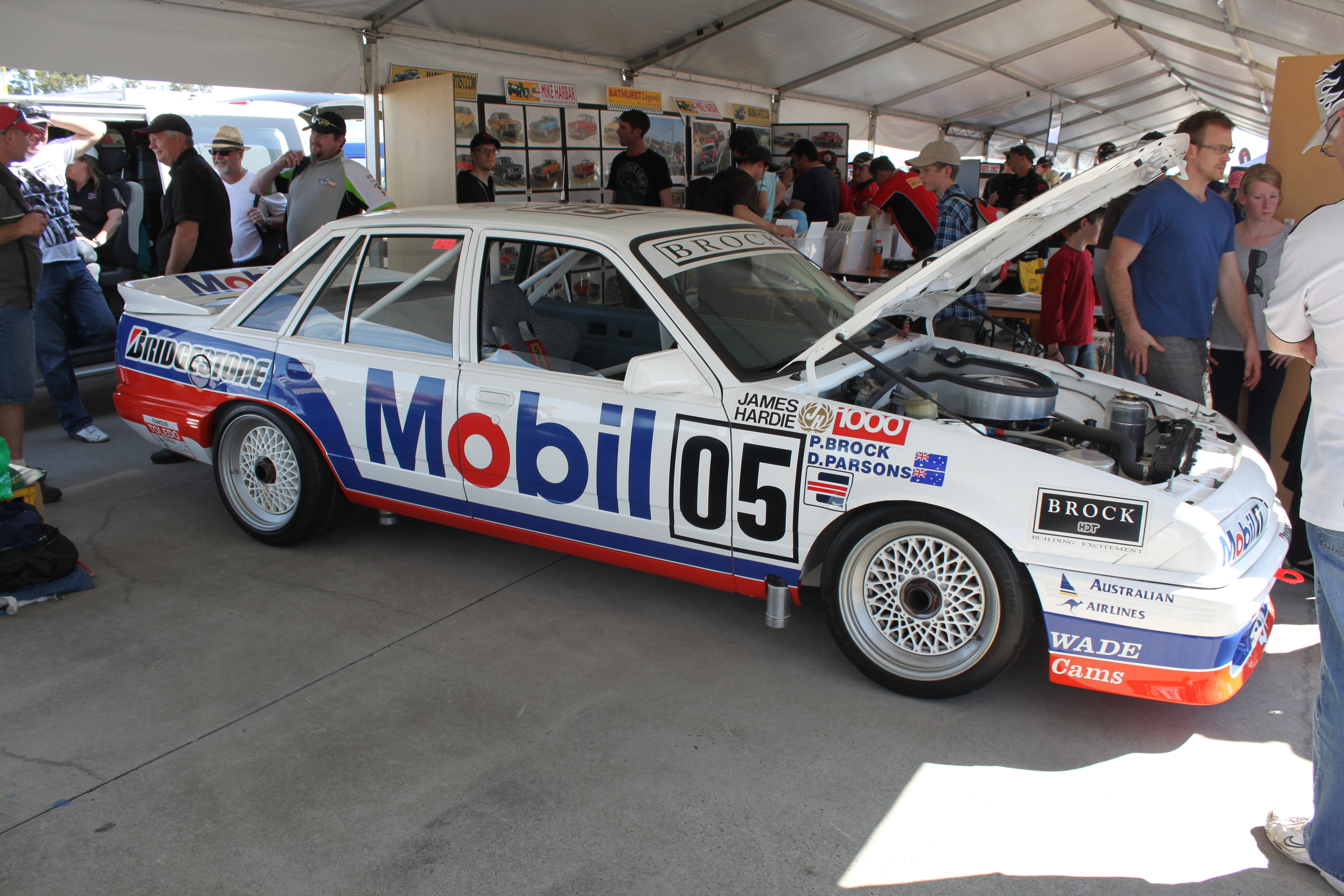
Holden VL Commodore as raced in 1987

In 1985 Australian touring car racing now ran under the FIA's International Group A formula, rather than the indigenous Group C production car regulations that had been in force since 1973. This led directly to the Holden Commodores becoming less competitive against the imported Nissans, Volvos, BMWs and Jaguars. 1985 also saw a change in sponsorship for the team with Mobil taking over as title sponsor from Marlboro. Brock explained in a magazine interview that other than for financial reasons, the change of sponsor was partly motivated by the growing anti-smoking lobby in Australia (Brock himself had given up smoking in mid-1984 after becoming ill when he returned from Le Mans) with the team finding it harder to justify handing out posters to kids with Marlboro cigarette signage prominent.

The team's 1985 season started off in January with the Wellington 500 and Pukekohe 500 races in New Zealand where Brock and Perkins failed to figure in the results their under-developed Group A Commodore. Despite only one win during the 1985 season in the cars Australian debut which saw Brock win Round 2 of the 1985 ATCC at Sandown (the team missed the opening round at Winton as the car was still in transit from NZ), Brock nearly pulled off an upset podium at Bathurst, retiring due to a broken timing chain three laps from the end of the race while running a strong second behind the much more powerful, V12 Jaguar XJS, driven by 1974 Bathurst winner John Goss and German Armin Hahne entered by European Touring Car Championship winners Tom Walkinshaw Racing (TWR). The single-row timing chain had been shown up throughout the year as a weak point of the Commodore's, something which would not cause a problem with the upgraded 1986 car which would have the more durable double-row timing chain.

By 1986, a homologated SS Group A version of the VK Commodore, originally intended to be released in 1985 but delayed due to the unavailability of parts which prevented HDT Special Vehicles from making the required 500 before 1 August homologation date, made the Commodore much more competitive, and Brock was able to sign longtime rival Allan Moffat to the team. The HDT, taking advantage of Group A regulations, also ran a car for Brock and Moffat in the 1986 FIA Touring Car Championship (formerly the European Touring Car Championship). Due to the liberal nature by which European regulators enforced the rules (and strong rumours that the TWR Rovers and the factory Volvo turbo's were nowhere near legal), the HDT was not as competitive as they hoped, but they still achieved some successes, such as co-winning the Kings Cup team's prize at the Spa 24 Hours with Allan Grice's Australian Racing Team. The HDT's best FIATCC finish were 5th places in Round 2 at Donington Park and Round 3 at Hockenheim, but the car was generally out-paced by Grice's privately entered Commodore prepared by longtime Roadways Racing chief mechanic/engineer, Les Small who had seen how the European teams operated and had followed suit.

Brock and John Harvey also contested the 1986 ATCC in their new Group A Commodore's, with Brock finishing as the highest placed Commodore driver in the series in 4th place. Brock's only win for the year was in Round 6 of the ATCC at Surfers Paradise. It would prove to be the final ATCC race win for a Holden until Brock won Heat 1 of Round 1 in 1992 at Amaroo Park. Brock and Moffat then teamed up in the Endurance Championship, finishing 6th at Surfers due to tyre problems, before Brock qualified the No. 05 Commodore on pole for the Castrol 500 at Sandown. The pair were favourites at Sandown, having won 12 of the previous 14 Sandown enduros between them. However minor problems in the race saw them finish a lap down in 4th place. They again went to Bathurst as favourites but missed out on a place in Hardies Heroes due to Moffat's crash on the top of The Mountain which resulted in the car needing a complete new front end. A strong run in the race with Brock moving form 11th to 2nd in the first 3 laps (though he was unable to catch Allan Grice for the lead) only saw the pair finish one lap down in 5th place largely thanks to a mid race pit stop which lost them over 2 laps due to a leaking oil cooler which had to be by-passed causing the 4.9-litre V8 to run hot for the rest of the race. The team's second car driven by John Harvey and 1986 team engineer/driver Neal Lowe finished 8th at Sandown before going on to finish in second place at Bathurst behind the Les Small prepared Commodore of Allan Grice and Graeme Bailey.

By 1987 the relationship between Brock and Holden had soured, primarily over the controversial 'Energy Polarizer' device Brock was installing in the HDT road cars. Moffat and Harvey both left the team, and HDT's 1987 international campaign was limited to a single car assault on the Spa 24 Hours, and team did not pose a threat in that year's ATCC. That year the Bathurst 1000 was a round of the World Touring Car Championship and Eggenberger Motorsport's turbocharged Ford Sierra RS500s dominated the race, finishing 1–2. Brock's own car failed early but he and co-driver David Parsons were cross-entered into the team's second car, which started the race in new recruit Peter McLeod's hands and made up ground in the wet conditions, and eventually finished in third place behind the two Sierras. Like 1983 a driver (in this case Formula 2 racer Jon Crooke) missed out on a Bathurst win when the lead car retired and its drivers transferred to the second car. Six months after the race was held, the Sierras were formerly disqualified for running illegal bodywork and Brock, Parsons and McLeod became the victors giving Brock his record 9th Bathurst win.

The team continued under the direction of Alan Gow, with continued support from Mobil, but without the assistance of Holden, new automotive partners had to be found. At the end of 1987, Frank Gardner had gone into a short-lived retirement and shut down the JPS Team BMW. The team bought the JPS team assets and became the official team for BMW Australia. However, by 1988, the naturally aspirated, 2.3L BMW M3 was no longer competitive against the much faster Ford Sierra's (especially in the ATCC where shorter races saw the 300 hp (224 kW; 304 PS) M3's unable to challenge with the 500 hp (373 kW; 507 PS) Sierra's) and Brock, Jim Richards, David Parsons and emerging talent Neil Crompton (also one of Channel Seven's lead commentators) found themselves fighting for scraps rather than the wins the JPS team had achieved in 1987. The Mobil team's only win during 1988 was when Brock and Richards won the Pepsi 250 at Oran Park with Parsons and Crompton finishing 4th.

The team's first time at both the Sandown and Bathurst endurance races with anything other than a Holden were forgettable. Although Richards qualified the lead M3 in 4th at Sandown, his time was over 3 seconds slower than Dick Johnson's pole time in his Sierra. After oil problems in the race for both cars, the No. 05 M3 of Brock, Richards and Parsons eventually finished in 8th place at Sandown while the team's second M3 failed to finish. For the Tooheys 1000 at Bathurst, the nature of the track and the improvement from the Sierra's (plus the introduction of the new Holden VL Commodore SS Group A SV and Nissan Skyline HR31 GTS-R turbo) saw the M3s even less competitive than they had been previously. Richards qualified the No. 56 M3 (running in Class B saw the team forced to give up using No. 05 for 1988) in just 16th place, some 6 seconds behind Johnson. The Brock/Richards car had a new BMW Motorsport engine for the race as well as a newly homologated 6-speed gearbox. However, the No. 56 car only lasted 89 laps before retiring with engine failure, while the No. 57 car (which had qualified 24th) was out on lap 68 with similar problems. Brock finished off 1988 by driving his M3 to 4th place in the Group A support race at the 1988 Australian Grand Prix in Adelaide.

By the 1989 ATCC season Brock was forced into the unthinkable and spent the next two years racing Ford Sierra RS500s to be competitive. The turbocharged Sierras had quickly become the car to have in touring car racing, and Brock's cars were supplied by English Sierra expert Andy Rouse, with Brock's own 1989 ATCC car the one Rouse had used to win the 1988 RAC Tourist Trophy at Silverstone. Rouse also supplied the team with the latest technical information for the cars and was Brock's co-driver at Bathurst in 1989 and 1990, the pair recording a DNF in 1989 and a 4th-place finish in 1990. Limited budget forced the team into a merger with Miedecke Motorsport in 1990, the merger was made all the more easy as Andrew Miedecke's team also ran Rouse supplied Sierras.

The venture with Ford was not without success. Brock won his first ATCC race since the 1986 when he stormed to victory in the final round of the 1989 ATCC at Oran Park to claim 3rd in the championship behind the Shell Sierra's of Dick Johnson and John Bowe. Brock went on to claim his last Bathurst pole position at the 1989 Tooheys 1000, but a rear hub failure caused the No. 05 car's retirement on lap 81 while the team's second Sierra (#105) driven by Brad Jones and Paul Radisich finished in 9th place. At the end of the year, Brock and Radisich drove the Sierra to victory in the Nissan-Mobil 500 Series in New Zealand. Brock also claimed pole position for the Group A support races at the 1989 Australian Grand Prix in Adelaide, though he only managed to finish 2nd and 5th in the two races after a couple of spins caused by his Bridgestone tyres not handling the hot conditions during the Saturday race, or the very wet conditions on the Sunday.

The team was again a force in the 1990 ATCC although they suffered a setback when Miedecke rolled his Sierra in at Mallala after an accidental clash with the Shell Sierra of his old open wheel adversary John Bowe. Consistent placings, and a win in Round 7 at Wanneroo where his tyre wear was actually helped by falling turbo boost, saw Brock finish 2nd in the championship. Brock had a chance of defeating former team mate Jim Richards (now with the Nissan team) for the title in the final round at Oran Park, but a poor start which saw him drop to 6th by the first turn cost him his chance, though he did eventually finish the race second behind Richards who was driving the new 4WD, twin-turbo Nissan GT-R. Brock actually proved that his Sierra was the only car that had the speed to match Richards in the race, but his poor start saw him have to fight through the field which allowed Richards to build a lead big enough to win the race and the title.

With Rouse going on to race Toyota's in 1991, the team faced the prospect of going it alone with the expensive Sierras without the latest technical information. At the end of 1990, Brock concluded a deal that would see him close his team and take his sponsorship to Perkins Engineering to race a Holden VN Commodore SS Group A SV.

=== Kenny Habul ownership ===
In September 2026 HDT was bought by racing driver Kenny Habul, with the brand set to be relaunched at the 2026 Bathurst 1000. At the 2026 event HDT sponsored Team 18 and Garry Rogers Motorsport's Chevrolet Camaros, with Team 18's car was fitted with an Energy Polarizer.

On 12 October 2026 Habul announced plans to headquarter HDT at Mount Panorama in Bathurst, New South Wales with a museum and facility for HDT vehicle maintenance, performance upgrades, safety upgrades, restomods and restoration. At announcement it has a temporary location in Kelso, relocating from Sydney. Habul also announced that HDT is developing a new performance car, with prototypes being tested in Australia, the United States, and Germany.

== HDT Special Vehicles ==
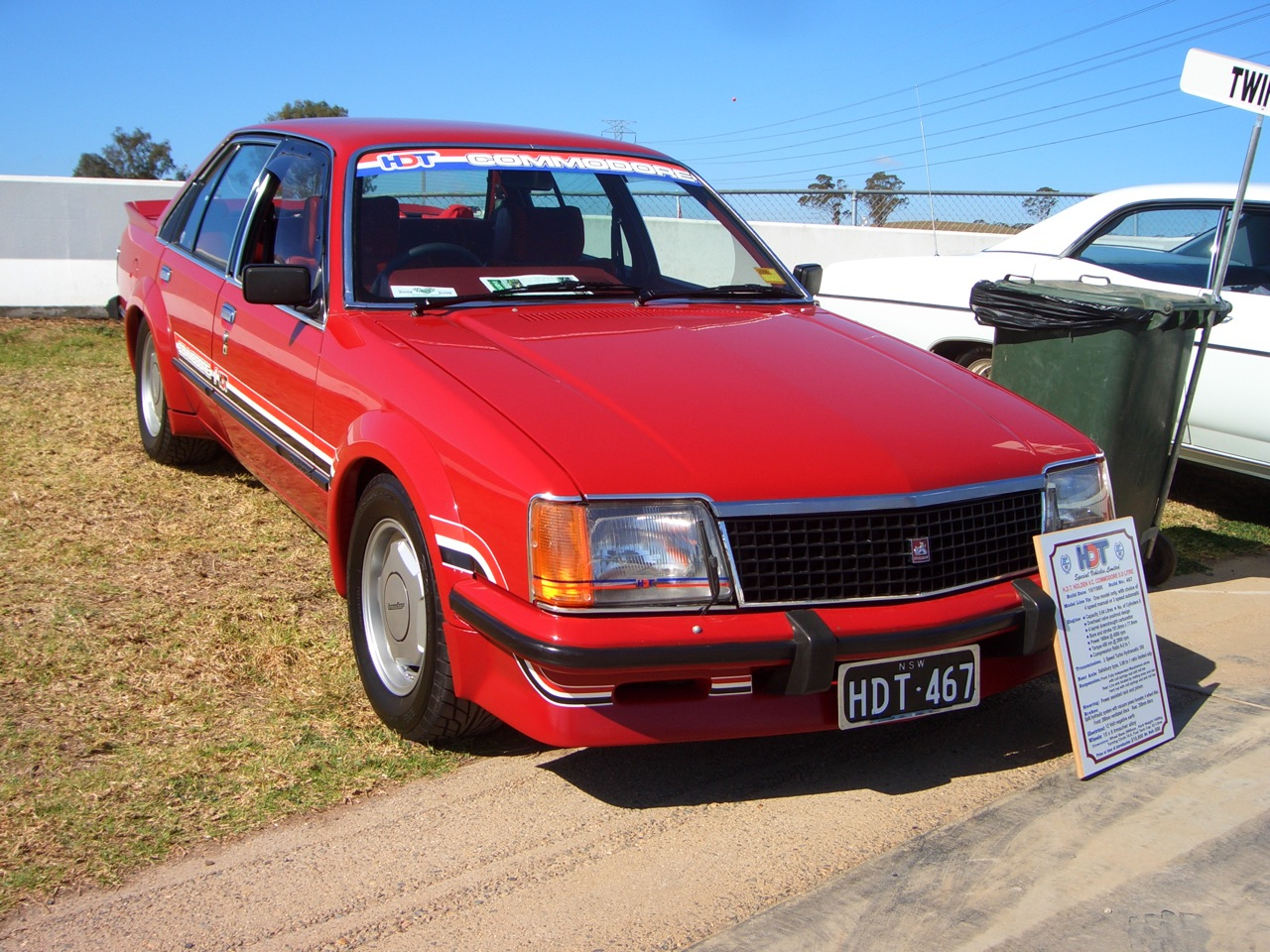
1980 VC Commodore HDT sedan in Firethorn Red.

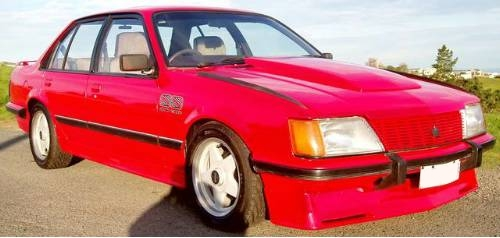
A slightly modified 1982 VH Commodore SS Group 3 sedan in Maranello Red.

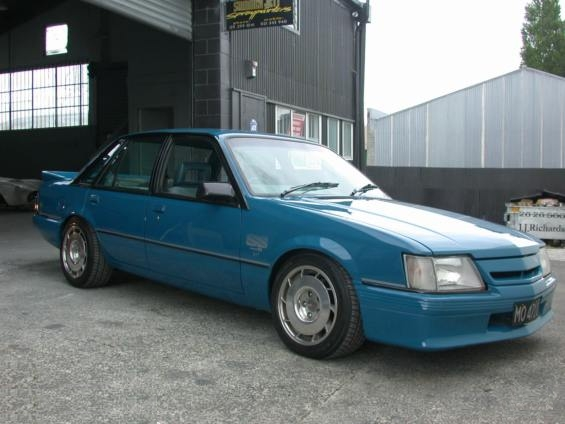
A slightly modified 1985 VK Commodore SS Group A sedan in Formula Blue. This model is nicknamed Blue Meanie by enthusiasts.

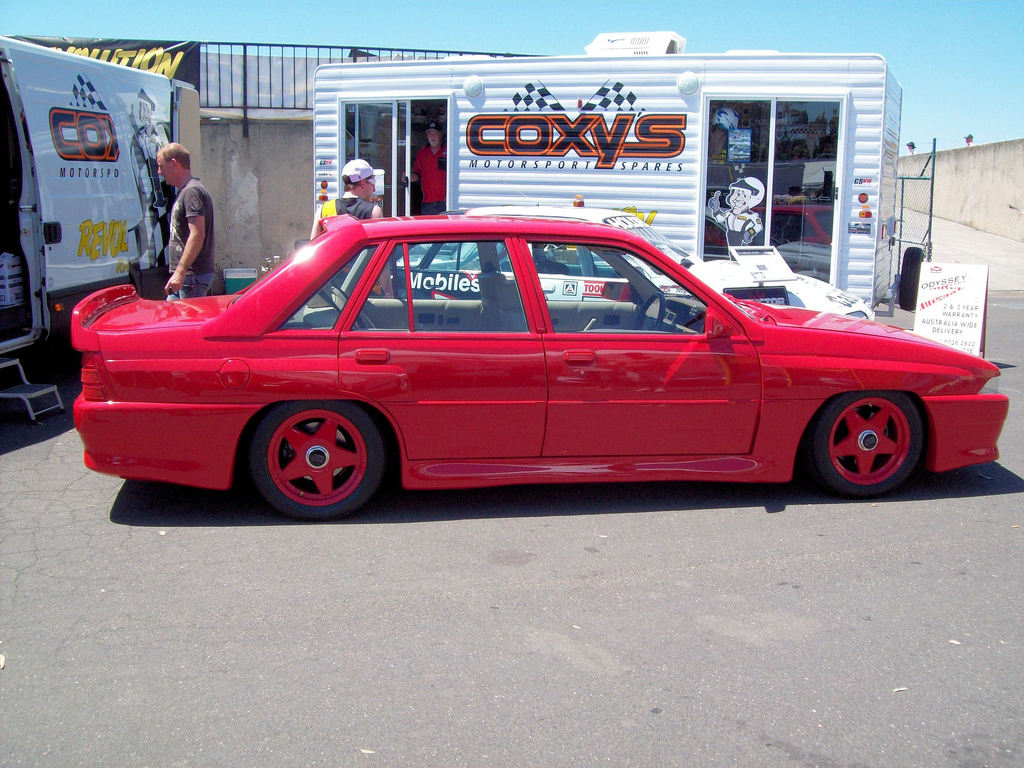
A 5.6L 1987 HDT Director in Maranello Red. The launch of this car in 1987, based on the VL Commodore, saw Holden sever ties with the HDT.

The original cars built by HDT Special Vehicles for road use, through the early and mid-1980s under Peter Brock's direction and had approval from Holden (based on the VC, VH, VK, and VL series Commodore, plus WB series Statesman), quickly gained an enthusiastic following. Some of these were "homologation specials" required to meet both Group C and Group A racing regulations. All HDT vehicles were individually numbered, with only 4246 produced.

HDT and Brock's association with Holden ended sensationally in 1987, after Brock began fitting a device known as the "Energy Polarizer" to his range of vehicles. This device was a small box with crystals and magnets encased in an epoxy resin, which Brock claimed improved the performance and handling of vehicles through "aligning the molecules". Brock was also quoted as saying that the Polarizer "made a shithouse car, good." Regarded as pseudoscience by Holden and the vast majority of the Australian motoring community, a new VL-series based "Director" model was then released in February 1987, which incorporated not only the Polarizer, but also a new independent rear suspension system developed by HDT without Holden's approval. Holden ended its association with Brock upon his refusal to submit this model to Holden for testing purposes, despite numerous chances to do so. Brock instead told Holden through the media that the relevant specifications were available in a magazine article which detailed the Director's pre-launch tour of Europe and North America in 1986, where it was compared to cars from BMW and Opel. Holden subsequently retaliated by deciding to not honour warranties on any cars modified by HDT.

Brock would go on to claim that Holden had wanted to end its association with HDT to establish its own brand of Commodore-based up-market models, and that the company was jealous of his large public profile and HDT's success in improving their standard cars without the resources available to General Motors. In 1987, therefore, in a partnership with the British-outfit Tom Walkinshaw Racing (TWR), created Holden Special Vehicles (HSV). Since that time, HSV has been producing factory-approved modified Commodores for general road use as well as for Group A racing homologation.

Because of their heritage and rarity, the original Brock-era HDT Commodores have a substantial place in Australian motoring history, and have become highly collectible. After Brock's death during a motorsport event in 2006, HDT vehicles became ever more sought after. In 2010, for example, a "Polarizer"-equipped HDT Director was expected to be sold at auction for over A$300,000, compared to its original list price of A$87,000 that rendered it the most expensive new Australian-made car when launched in 1987.

Peter Champion, a close friend of Peter Brock purchased HDT in 2007 and relaunched the brand, modifing the Commodore, and released the retro-styled Heritage Series of Commodores.

=== Brock era cars ===
The following is the range of high performance HDT cars produced under Peter Brock's direction and with approval during the 1980s (by Commodore series reference and in sedan form unless otherwise stated):

- VC Commodore HDT – 5.0-litre V8
- VH Commodore SLE Top 30 – 5.0-litre V8
- VH Commodore ADP sedan and wagon – 4.2-litre or 5.0-litre V8
- VH Commodore SS Group One – 4.2-litre V8
- VH Commodore SS Group Two – 4.2-litre V8
- VH Commodore SS Group Three – 4.2-litre or 5.0-litre V8
- WB Statesman De Ville Magnum – 5.0-litre V8
- WB Statesman Caprice Magnum – 5.0-litre V8
- VK Commodore LM5000 – 5.0-litre
- VK Commodore ADP sedan and wagon – 4.9-litre or 5.0-litre V8
- VK Commodore ADP (SL Group A) – 4.9-litre or 5.0-litre V8
- VK Commodore SS – 4.9-litre or 5.0-litre V8
- VK Commodore SS Group Three – 4.9-litre or 5.0-litre V8
- VK CALAIS DIRECTOR – 4.9-litre or 5.0-litre V8
- VK Commodore SS Group A – 4.9-litre V8 (nicknamed Blue Meanie)
- VK Commodore SS Group A Group Three – 4.9-litre V8
- VL Calais LE – 6-cylinder Nissan (RB30E) 3.0-litre or (RB30ET) 3.0-litre Turbo, or 4.9-litre V8
- VL Corsa (Commodore LE) – 6-cylinder Nissan 3.0-litre or 3.0-litre Turbo
- VL Commodore SS Group A – 4.9-litre V8
- VL Commodore SS Group A "Plus Pack" – 4.9-litre V8
- VL Commodore Sport – 6-Cylinder Nissan (RB30E) 3.0-litre, or (RB30ET) 3.0-litre Turbo, or 4.9-litre V8
- VL Calais Sport – 6-Cylinder Nissan (RB30E) 3.0-litre, or (RB30ET) 3.0-litre Turbo, or 4.9-litre V8

The range of high performance HDT cars produced by HDT independent of Holden include (by Commodore series reference and in sedan form unless otherwise stated):

- VL HDT Director – 4.9-litre or 5.6-litre V8
- VL HDT Group Three – 4.9-litre V8
- VL HDT Designer Series sedan and wagon – 6-cylinder Nissan 3.0-litre or 3.0-litre Turbo, or 4.9-litre V8
- VL HDT Aero – 4.9-litre, 5.6-litre
- VL HDT Bathurst – 4.9-litre or 5.6-litre V8

In addition to the above, various other 'one-off' HDT cars were also manufactured between 1980 and 1988 period. Chief among these is the MONZA coupe fitted with a 5.0-litre V8 that was displayed around Australia in 1985 with plans for production, which never eventuated. John Harvey later reported that Peter Brock, who had first driven an Opel Monza road car when he hired one as his personal transport while in France competing at Le Mans in 1984 and was impressed with its handling (and that it had been built on the same platform as the VB-VK Commodores which made it easy to slot in a V8 engine), was keen to add the Monza to HDT's range. Brock has also previously raced the Bob Jane-owned Chevrolet Monza in the Australian Sports Sedan and GT championships in the early 1980s. While it was thought that the V8 Monza coupe would be appealing to Holden fans, especially as it resembled the appearance of the popular hatchback Toranas of the late 1970s (visually the car was essentially the Opel Monza GSE with the VK Commodore's distinctive 5-slot grille (to give it a more Australian look), the reasons that the car was not brought to market included that it was by then an old mid-1970s model and the projected high production costs would not have made it a viable project.

HDT's modifications to the Monza coupe included the 180 kW (241 bhp) Group III 5.0-litre V8 engine (which was in fact lighter than the 3.0-litre six-cylinder Opel engine it replaced, as well as being set back closer to the firewall for better weight distribution), a 5-speed manual Borg Warner TG5 transmission, reck-and-pinion steering, and Corvette-styled front disc brakes (later adopted to the Holden VL Commodore turbo and V8 models). The HDT Monza was claimed to be able to reach 250 km/h (155 mph). the sale price of the car was projected to be approximately $45,000. Despite 8 pre-production orders being taken for the car upon its public debut at the 1984 Canberra Motor Show, the sale price would prove to be another reason that only one HDT Monza was ever built. As a comparison, the 1985 Holden VK Commodore SS Group A "Blue Meanie" had a sale price of just under $26,000. The only HDT Monza ever built went up for auction in Sydney in May 2016 and was expected to be sold for as much as AU$120,000.

=== HDT Jackaroo ===
During the early 1980s, General Motors–Holden (GMH) approached a Victorian workshop—sometimes referred to as Specialty Tuning or Spencer Bros in Mitcham—to develop a performance upgrade for the first-generation Holden Jackaroo. The workshop had prior experience in tuning and racing Holden Geminis, and applied similar principles to the Jackaroo’s 2.0-litre four-cylinder engine. This resulted in what became known as the STII Performance Kit, which included a custom exhaust system (with Lukey mufflers and Perry headers), a revised camshaft profile, and, in some cases, a Weber carburetor conversion.

Testing of the STII kit took place at GMH’s Lang Lang Proving Ground, where it demonstrated improved performance without exceeding emissions limits. Following successful trials, approximately twenty Jackaroos were sent to the HDT facility in North Melbourne for additional cosmetic and branding treatments between the VC and VH Commodore-based HDT vehicles. These included HDT decals, badging, and HDT serial plates. Around this time, however, controversy surrounding the Energy Polarizer led GMH to distance itself from HDT project. The workshop subsequently received permission to market the STII kit independently, and full-scale HDT involvement with the Jackaroo was effectively curtailed.

=== Pennisi brothers ownership ===
Brothers Len and Sid Pennisi bought HDT Special Vehicles in 1994 and moved the Head Office to Sydney. The brothers reestablished the brand and continued building new HDT vehicles while also restoring and servicing previous HDT models and supplying parts and accessories at their state of the art premises in Revesby NSW. The podium finish for Brock in the 24hr 427 Monaro inspired the new HDT owners to develop a range of HDT Aero sedans, Magnum utes, and Sport vehicles – including the Monaro, carrying the Monza name. Three of these Monza vehicles were produced during the early part of 2000. These new Monzas were built to different specifications, with the most powerful and highly developed type being the R/T variant, which saw track work on most club days at Eastern Creek.

=== New Generation cars ===
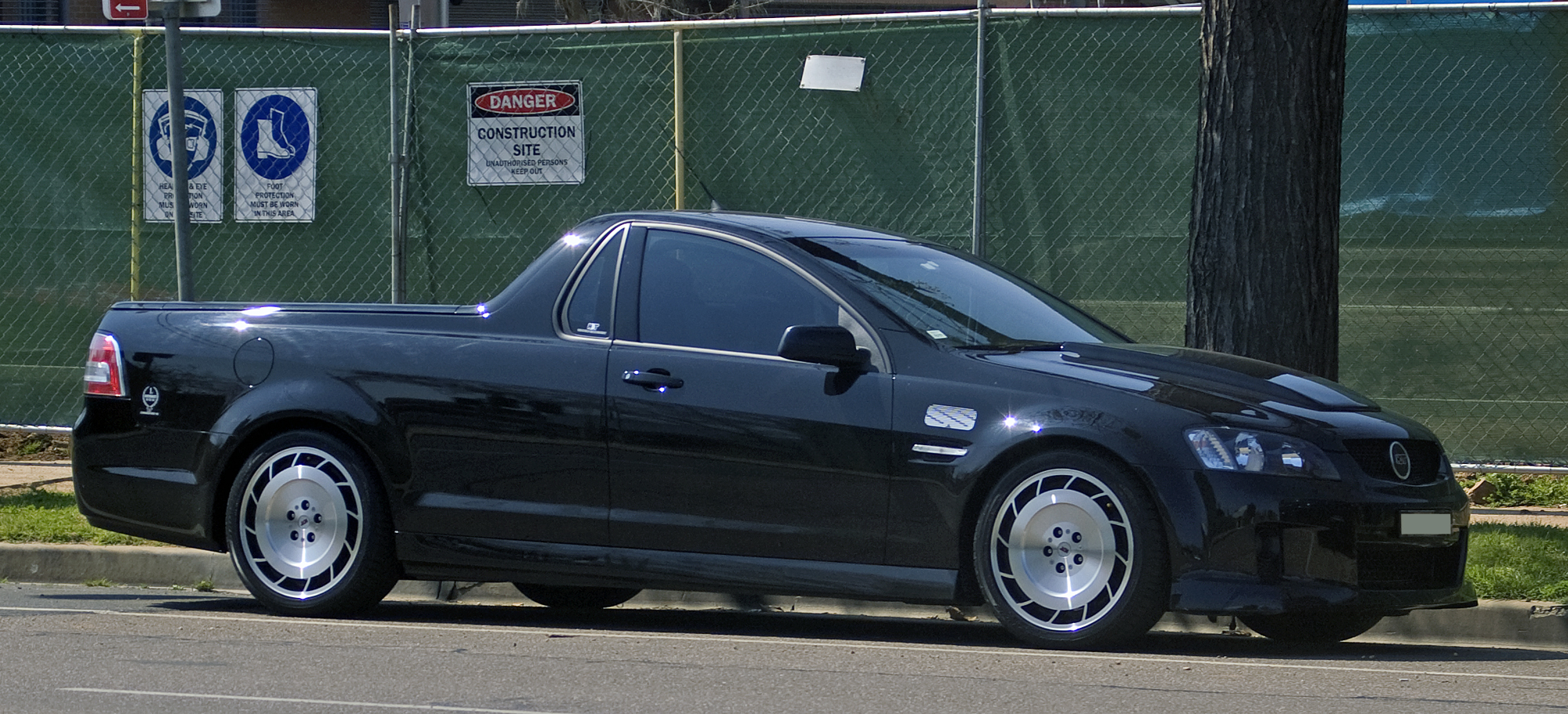
A HDT VC Retro ute.

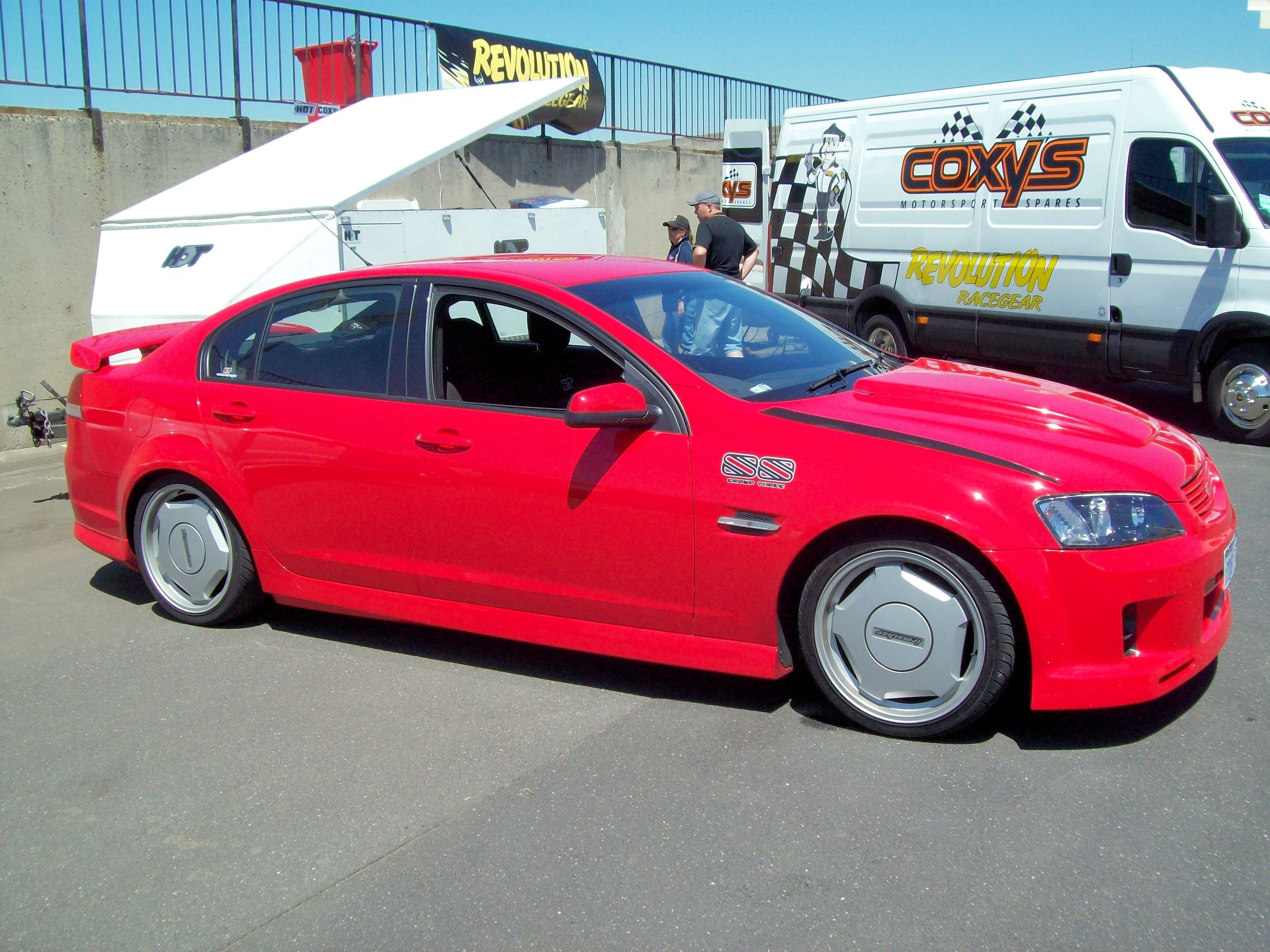
2008 HDT VE SS Group III – VH Retro sedan

Since 2007, a relaunched HDT has been offering a 'New Generation' of high performance road vehicles based on the Holden Commodore (VE). These cars form HDT's new "Heritage Series", which adopt a "retro" look based on the iconic range available during the Brock era.

The first of these 'New Generation' cars is called the VC Retro sedan, appropriately styled upon Brock's first public release vehicle, the Commodore (VC)-based sedan of late 1980.

==== Heritage Series ====
The following is the range of high performance HDT cars produced under Peter Champion's ownership of HDT and based on the VE series Commodore:

- VC RETRO – based on VE Commodore SV6, SS, and SS-V
- VC RETRO 30TH ANNIVERSARY – based on VE Commodore SS and SS-V
- VH RETRO – based on VE Commodore SV6, SS, and SS-V
- VK GROUP A RETRO – based on VE Commodore (re-nicknamed Blue Meanie; 30th Anniversary model limited to 30 units)
- VK GROUP 3 RETRO – based upon VE Commodore SS and SS-V
- VL Group A Retro – based upon VE Commodore SS and SS-V.

== Championships ==
This is a list of championships and series won by the Holden Dealer Team from 1969 to 1987 in touring car racing, rallying and rallycross.

Australian Manufacturers' Championship results have not been included as that title was awarded to the manufacturer (e.g. General Motors-Holden) rather than to an individual driver or team.

In addition to the series mentioned on the list the Holden Dealer Team also contested various Sports Sedan series, as well as two rounds of the 1984 World Endurance Championship with a Porsche 956B.

Year	Championship or Series	Driver	Co-driver	Car
1970	Calder Rallycross Championship	Peter Brock		Holden LC Torana GTR (supercharged)
1970	South Australian Rallycross Championship	Peter Brock		Holden LC Torana GTR (supercharged)
1970	New South Wales Rally Championship	Barry Ferguson	David Johnson	Holden Monaro HT GTS350, Holden LC Torana GTR XU-1
1971	Australian Rally Championship	Colin Bond	George Shepheard	Holden LC Torana GTR XU-1
1971	South Pacific Touring Series	Colin Bond		Holden LC Torana GTR XU-1
1971	Calder Rallycross Championship	Peter Brock		Holden LC Torana GTR (supercharged)
1971	South Australian Rallycross Championship	Peter Brock		Holden LC Torana GTR (supercharged)
1971	New South Wales Rally Championship	Barry Ferguson	David Johnson, George Shepheard	Holden LC Torana GTR XU-1
1972	Australian Rally Championship	Colin Bond	George Shepheard	Holden LJ Torana GTR XU-1
1972	Toby Lee Series	Colin Bond		Holden LJ Torana GTR XU-1
1972	Sun-7 Chesterfield Series	Colin Bond		Holden LJ Torana GTR XU-1
1972	Calder TAA Series	Peter Brock		Holden LJ Torana GTR XU-1
1972	Calder Rallycross Championship	Peter Brock		Holden LC Torana GTR (supercharged)
1972	Catalina Rallycross Series	Colin Bond		Holden LJ Torana GTR XU-1, Holden LC Torana GTR (supercharged)
1973	Australian Rally Championship	Peter Lang	Warwick Smith	Holden LJ Torana GTR XU-1
1973	South Pacific Touring Series	Peter Brock		Holden LJ Torana GTR XU-1
1973	Sun-7 Chesterfield Series	Colin Bond		Holden LJ Torana GTR XU-1
1974	Australian Touring Car Championship	Peter Brock		Holden LJ Torana GTR XU-1, Holden LH Torana SL/R 5000
1974	Australian Rally Championship	Colin Bond	George Shepheard	Holden LJ Torana GTR XU-1
1974	South Pacific Touring Series	Peter Brock		Holden LJ Torana GTR XU-1
1974	Sun-7 Chesterfield Series	Colin Bond		Holden LJ Torana GTR XU-1, Holden LH Torana SL/R 5000 L34
1975	Australian Touring Car Championship	Colin Bond		Holden LH Torana SL/R 5000 L34
1975	South Pacific Touring Series	Colin Bond		Holden LH Torana SL/R 5000 L34
1978	Australian Touring Car Championship	Peter Brock		Holden LX Torana SS A9X
1980	Australian Touring Car Championship	Peter Brock		Holden VB Commodore
1987	Nissan-Mobil 500 Series	Peter Brock	Allan Moffat	Holden VK Commodore SS Group A

== Wins ==
=== Bathurst 500/1000 Wins ===
Year	Class	No	Drivers	Chassis	Laps
Year	Class	No	Drivers	Engine	Laps
1969	D	44	(Australia) Colin Bond (Australia) Tony Roberts	Holden HT Monaro GTS350	130
1969	D	44	(Australia) Colin Bond (Australia) Tony Roberts	Chevrolet 350 5.7 L V8	130
1972	C	28	(Australia) Peter Brock	Holden LJ Torana GTR XU-1	130
1972	C	28	(Australia) Peter Brock	Holden 202 3.3 L I6	130
1978	D	05	(Australia) Peter Brock (New Zealand) Jim Richards	Holden LX Torana SS A9X Hatchback	163
1978	D	05	(Australia) Peter Brock (New Zealand) Jim Richards	Holden 308 5.0 L V8	163
1979	A	05	(Australia) Peter Brock (New Zealand) Jim Richards	Holden LX Torana SS A9X Hatchback	163
1979	A	05	(Australia) Peter Brock (New Zealand) Jim Richards	Holden 308 5.0 L V8	163
1980	3001cc – 6000cc	05	(Australia) Peter Brock (New Zealand) Jim Richards	Holden VC Commodore	163
1980	3001cc – 6000cc	05	(Australia) Peter Brock (New Zealand) Jim Richards	Holden 308 5.0 L V8	163
1982	A	05	(Australia) Peter Brock (Australia) Larry Perkins	Holden VH Commodore SS	163
1982	A	05	(Australia) Peter Brock (Australia) Larry Perkins	Holden 308 5.0 L V8	163
1983	A	25	(Australia) John Harvey (Australia) Peter Brock (Australia) Larry Perkins (Australia) Phil Brock	Holden VH Commodore SS	163
1983	A	25	(Australia) John Harvey (Australia) Peter Brock (Australia) Larry Perkins (Australia) Phil Brock	Holden 308 5.0 L V8	163
1984	C	05	(Australia) Peter Brock (Australia) Larry Perkins	Holden VK Commodore SS	163
1984	C	05	(Australia) Peter Brock (Australia) Larry Perkins	Holden 308 5.0 L V8	163
1987	3	10	(Australia) Peter McLeod (Australia) Peter Brock (Australia) David Parsons (Australia) Jon Crooke	Holden VL Commodore SS Group A	158
1987	3	10	(Australia) Peter McLeod (Australia) Peter Brock (Australia) David Parsons (Australia) Jon Crooke	Holden 304 4.9 L V8	158

=== Sandown Endurance Wins ===
Year	Class	No	Drivers	Chassis	Laps
Year	Class	No	Drivers	Engine	Laps
1971	D	44	(Australia) Colin Bond	Holden LC Torana GTR XU-1	130
1971	D	44	(Australia) Colin Bond	Holden 186 3.0 L I6	130
1973	D	1	(Australia) Peter Brock	Holden LJ Torana GTR XU-1	130
1973	D	1	(Australia) Peter Brock	Holden 202 3.3 L I6	130
1978	6000cc	05	(Australia) Peter Brock	Holden LX Torana SS A9X Hatchback	129
1978	6000cc	05	(Australia) Peter Brock	Holden 308 5.0 L V8	129
1979	A	05	(Australia) Peter Brock	Holden LX Torana SS A9X Hatchback	129
1979	A	05	(Australia) Peter Brock	Holden 308 5.0 L V8	129
1980	A	05	(Australia) Peter Brock	Holden VC Commodore	109
1980	A	05	(Australia) Peter Brock	Holden 308 5.0 L V8	109
1981	A	05	(Australia) Peter Brock	Holden VC Commodore	119
1981	A	05	(Australia) Peter Brock	Holden 308 5.0 L V8	119
1984	A	05	(Australia) Peter Brock (Australia) Larry Perkins	Holden VK Commodore SS	129
1984	A	05	(Australia) Peter Brock (Australia) Larry Perkins	Holden 308 5.0 L V8	129

=== Endurance Wins ===
Other touring car endurance race wins by the Holden Dealer Team (1969–1987) include:

- 1970 Rothmans 12 Hour at Surfers Paradise – Colin Bond and Tony Roberts (Holden HT Monaro GTS350)
- 1971 Castrol Trophy at Warwick Farm – Colin Bond (Holden LC Torana GTR XU-1)
- 1971 Phillip Island 500K at Phillip Island – Colin Bond (Holden LC Torana GTR XU-1)
- 1972 Chesterfield 250 at Adelaide International Raceway – Colin Bond (Holden LJ Torana GTR XU-1)
- 1973 Chesterfield 300 at Surfers Paradise – Peter Brock (Holden LJ Torana GTR XU-1)
- 1973 Phillip Island 500K at Phillip Island – Peter Brock (Holden LJ Torana GTR XU-1)
- 1974 Chesterfield 250 at Adelaide International Raceway – Colin Bond (Holden LH Torana SL/R 5000)
- 1974 Chesterfield 300 at Surfers Paradise – Colin Bond (Holden LH Torana SL/R 5000)
- 1974 Repo 500K at Phillip Island – Colin Bond (Holden LH Torana SL/R 5000)
- 1975 Chesterfield 250 at Adelaide International Raceway – Colin Bond (Holden LH Torana SL/R 5000 L34)
- 1976 Rover 500K at Phillip Island – Colin Bond (Holden LH Torana SL/R 5000 L34)
- 1978 ABE Copiers 250 at Oran Park – John Harvey (Holden LX Torana SS A9X Hatchback)
- 1978 Rothmans 300 at Surfers Paradise – Peter Brock (Holden LX Torana SS A9X Hatchback)
- 1980 CRC 300 at Amaroo Park – Peter Brock (Holden VB Commodore)
- 1980 Adelaide 300 at Adelaide International Raceway – Peter Brock (Holden VB Commodore)
- 1981 CRC 300 at Amaroo Park – Peter Brock and John Harvey (Holden VC Commodore)
- 1981 Adelaide 250 at Adelaide International Raceway – Peter Brock (Holden VC Commodore)
- 1983 Humes Guardrail 300 at Adelaide International Raceway – Peter Brock (Holden VH Commodore SS)
- 1984 Motorcraft 300 at Surfers Paradise – Peter Brock (Holden VK Commodore SS)
- 1986 Wellington 500 at Wellington (NZ) – Peter Brock and Allan Moffat (Holden VK Commodore SS Group A)
- 1986 Pukekohe 500 at Pukekohe Park Raceway (NZ) – John Harvey and Neal Lowe (Holden VK Commodore SS Group A)
- 1987 Wellington 500 at Wellington (NZ) – Peter Brock and Allan Moffat (Holden VK Commodore SS Group A)

In addition, the HDT's VK SS Group A Commodores of Neal Lowe, Kent Baigent and Graeme Bowkett (18th) and Peter Brock, Allan Moffat and John Harvey (22nd), teamed with the Australian National Motor Racing Team Commodore of Allan Grice, Michel Delcourt and Alex Guyaux (23rd) to win the prestigious Coupe du Roi (King's Cup) at the 1986 Spa 24 Hours.

== Drivers ==
Those who drove for the Holden Dealer Team in its many guises in touring car racing during its 21 years of competition (1969–1990), including their time running BMW M3's (1988) and Ford Sierra RS500's (1989–1990) include (in order of appearance):

- (Australia) Spencer Martin (1969)
- (Australia) Kevin Bartlett (1969)
- (Australia) Peter Macrow (1969)
- (Australia) Henk Woelders (1969)
- (Australia) Des West (1969)
- (Australia) Peter Brock (1969–1974, 1978–1993)
- (Australia) Colin Bond (1969–1976)
- (Australia) Tony Roberts (1969–1970)
- (Australia) Christine Cole (1970)
- (Australia) Sandra Bennett (1970)
- (Australia) Bob Morris (1970)
- (Australia) Larry Perkins (1971–1972, 1982–1985)
- (Australia) Doug Chivas (1973)
- (Australia) Leo Geoghegan (1973)
- (Australia) Dick Johnson (1974)
- (Australia) Bob Skelton (1974)
- (Australia) Brian Sampson (1974)
- (Australia) Johnnie Walker (1975–1976)
- (Australia) John Harvey (1976–1987)
- (Australia) Wayne Negus (1976–1977)
- (Australia) Charlie O'Brien (1976–1977)
- (Australia) Ron Harrop (1977–1980)
- (New Zealand) Jim Richards (1978–1981, 1988)
- (Canada) Allan Moffat (1980, 1986–1987)
- (Australia) Vern Schuppan (1981)
- (Australia) Gary Scott (1982, 1987)
- (Australia) Phil Brock (1983)
- (Australia) David Parsons (1984–1985, 1987–1988, 1990)
- (New Zealand) David Oxton (1985, 1987)
- (New Zealand) Neal Lowe (1986)
- (New Zealand) Kent Baigent (1986)
- (New Zealand) Graeme Bowkett (1986)
- (Australia) Jon Crooke (1987)
- (Australia) Neil Crompton (1987–1988)
- (Australia) Peter McLeod (1987)
- (Australia) Brad Jones (1989)
- (Australia) Mark Larkham (1989)
- (New Zealand) Paul Radisich (1989)
- (United Kingdom) Andy Rouse (1989–1990)
- (Australia) Andrew Miedecke (1990)
- (Australia) Tony Noske (1990)

== ATCC Results ==
=== Car No.05 Results ===
Year	Driver	No.	Make	1	2	3	4	5	6	7	8	9	10	11	12	13	14	15	16	17	18	19	20	21	22	23	24	25	26	27	28	29	30	Position	Pts
1973	Peter Brock	1/2/11	Holden	SYM; R1; 2	CAL; R2; Ret	SAN; R3; Ret	BAR; R4; 2	SUR; R5; 1	ADE; R6; 1	ORA; R7; DSQ	WAR; R8; 1																							2nd	57
1974	Peter Brock	2/6/8	Holden	SYM; R1; 1	CAL; R2; 1	SAN; R3; 3	AMA; R4; 1	ORA; R5; 2	SUR; R6; 1	ADE; R7; 1																								1st	80
1976	John Harvey	14	Holden	SYM; R1	CAL; R2	ORA; R3	SAN; R4; 4	AMA; R5; 3	ADE; R6	LAK; R7	SAN; R8	ADE; R9	SUR; R10	PHI; R11; Ret																				11th	23

=== Car No.6 Results ===
Year	Driver	No.	Make	1	2	3	4	5	6	7	8	9	10	11	12	13	14	15	16	17	18	19	20	21	22	23	24	25	26	27	28	29	30	Position	Pts
1971	Colin Bond	44	Holden	CAL; R1	BAT; R2	SAN; R3; 5	MAL; R4	WAR; R5	LAK; R6	SYM; R7																								10th	2
1972	Colin Bond	34	Holden	SYM; R1	CAL; R2	BAT; R3; 10	SAN; R4	ADE; R4	WAR; R6; 6	SUR; R7	ORA; R8																							26th	2
1973	Colin Bond	24	Holden	SYM; R1	CAL; R2	SAN; R3	BAR; R4	SUR; R5	ADE; R6	ORA; R7; 2	WAR; R8																							11th	9
1974	Colin Bond	1	Holden	SYM; R1	CAL; R2	SAN; R3	AMA; R4; 3	ORA; R5		ADE; R7																								13th	6
1974	Dick Johnson	2	Holden						SUR; R6; 3																									13th	6
1975	Colin Bond	2	Holden	SYM; R1; 1	CAL; R2; 3	AMA; R3; Ret	ORA; R4; 2	SUR; R5; 3	SAN; R6; C	ADE; R7; 1	LAK; R8; 1																							1st	60
1976	Colin Bond	1	Holden	SYM; R1; 2	CAL; R2; 2	ORA; R3; 4	SAN; R4; 1	AMA; R5; Ret	ADE; R6; 3	LAK; R7; 1	SAN; R8; Ret	ADE; R9; 5	SUR; R10; Ret	PHI; R11; 1																				2nd	72

== See also ==
- Holden Dealer Racing Team (1968 team run by Scuderia Veloce, not associated with the HDT)
- HSV Dealer Team (2005-2007 team run by Walkinshaw Racing)
