= 1974 Australian Touring Car Championship =

Motor racing competition

Seasons
- ← 1973 1975 →

The 1974 Australian Touring Car Championship was an Australian motor racing competition open to Group C Touring Cars. Authorised by the Confederation of Australian Motor Sport as an Australian National Title, it was the 15th running of the Australian Touring Car Championship. The championship began at Symmons Plains on 4 March 1974 and ended at Adelaide International Raceway on 9 June after eight rounds.

The championship was won by Peter Brock, driving for the Holden Dealer Team in a Holden LJ Torana GTR XU-1 and a Holden LH Torana SL/R 5000.

== Drivers ==
The following drivers contested the championship.

Entrant	No.	Car	Driver
Holden Dealer Team	1	Holden LJ Torana GTR XU-1	Colin Bond
Holden Dealer Team	2	Holden LJ Torana GTR XU-1	Dick Johnson
Holden Dealer Team	2; 6; 8	Holden LJ Torana GTR XU-1; Holden LH Torana SL/R 5000	Peter Brock
Phil Waters	4	Ford XY Falcon GTHO Phase III	Phil Waters
Allan Grice	4	Holden LH Torana SL/R 5000	Allan Grice
McLeod Ford	5	Ford XB Falcon GT Hardtop	John Goss
Road & Track Auto Services	6	Ford XB Falcon GT Hardtop	Fred Gibson
Bob Jane Racing	7	Holden LJ Torana GTR XU-1	Bob Jane
Dustings of Burwood	9	Holden LJ Torana GTR XU-1	Rod McRae
Bob Forbes	10	Holden LJ Torana GTR XU-1	Bob Forbes
Gary Cooke	11	Mazda RX-3	Gary Cooke
Norman G. Booth Pty. Ltd.	12	Holden LJ Torana GTR XU-1	Jim Hunter
Bryan Byrt Ford	13	Ford Escort GT1600	Bob Holden
Peak Performance P/L	14	Ford Escort GT1600	John English
John Stoopman	15	Holden LJ Torana GTR XU-1	John Stoopman
Insul Fluf Home Insulation	16	Holden LJ Torana GTR XU-1	Graeme Blanchard
Ron Hodgson Motors	17	Holden LJ Torana GTR XU-1	Bob Morris
Murray Carter Motors	18	Ford XA Falcon GT Hardtop	Murray Carter
Muirs Mtrs. Ashfield	19	Holden HQ Monaro GTS350	Ron Dickson
Peter Robinson Motors	20	Holden LJ Torana GTR XU-1	Tony Niovanni
Kevin Kennedy	21	Holden LJ Torana GTR XU-1	Kevin Kennedy
D. Holland Motors	24	Holden LJ Torana GTR XU-1	Don Holland
Graham Parsons	25	Holden LJ Torana GTR XU-1	Graham Parsons
Mulgrave Mazda	26	Mazda RX-3	Mel Mollison
Richard Purtell	27	Holden LJ Torana GTR XU-1	Richard Purtell
Neil West	28	Holden LJ Torana GTR XU-1	Neil West
Ray Gulson	29	Alfa Romeo 2000 GTV	Ray Gulson
M. McGinley	29	Honda Civic	Gordon Dickson
W. A. Fisher (Holdings) Pty. Ltd.	30	Mazda RX-3	Bernie Haehnle
Lawrie Nelson	32	Chrysler Valiant Charger R/T E49	Lawrie Nelson
Allan Moffat Racing	33	Ford XB Falcon GT Hardtop	Allan Moffat
Ken Loughan	34	Holden LJ Torana GTR XU-1	Ken Loughan
McRaes of Hastings	35	Holden LJ Torana GTR XU-1	Russ McRae
Matthew Phillip	36	Holden LJ Torana GTR XU-1	Matthew Phillip
Alan Cant	37	Ford Escort GT1600	Alan Cant
Alan Taylor	38	Holden LJ Torana GTR XU-1	Alan Taylor
B & D Autos	39	Holden LJ Torana GTR XU-1	Tim Smith
Graham Ryan	41	Holden LJ Torana GTR XU-1	Graham Ryan
Robert Bride	42	Holden LJ Torana GTR XU-1	Robert Bride
John French Pty. Ltd.	43	Alfa Romeo 2000 GTV	John French
George Garth	44	Holden LJ Torana GTR XU-1	George Garth
R. J. Holden	45	Ford Escort GT1600	Lyndon Arnel
Keith Henry	49	Morris Cooper S	Keith Henry
Brian Ovenden	50	Chrysler Valiant Charger R/T E49	Brian Ovenden
John Wharton	51	Mazda RX-3	John Wharton
Cam Richardson	52	Holden LJ Torana GTR XU-1	Cam Richardson
Barry Benson	55	Ford Escort GT1600	Barry Seton
Ron Dickson	58	Holden HQ Monaro GTS350	Ron Dickson
Peter Mac's Towing	62	Ford Escort GT1600	Geoff Wade
Roger Bonhomme	63	Holden LC Torana GTR	Roger Bonhomme
A. C. R. Watts / Coca-Cola Bottlers	64	Morris Cooper S	Tony Watts
David Clement	66	Morris Cooper S	David Clement
Geoff Perry	69	Mazda RX-3	Geoff Perry
R. D. Mahoney	74	Ford Escort GT1600	Roger Mahoney
John Millyard	80	Holden LJ Torana GTR XU-1	John Millyard
John Gifford	81	Morris Cooper S	John Gifford
John Lewis	82	Holden LJ Torana GTR XU-1	John Lewis
Milton Leslight	85	Holden LJ Torana GTR XU-1	Milton Leslight
Tom Heffernan	86	Holden Torana GTR	Tom Heffernan
Keith Shaw	88	Honda Civic	Keith Shaw
Dean Smith	90	Ford Escort GT1600	Dean Smith
A. F. & M. Beninca P/L	91	Alfa Romeo 2000 GTV	Ray Harrison
P. A. Buda	92	Morris Cooper S	Phil Buda
Graeme Adams	94	Holden LJ Torana GTR XU-1	Graeme Adams
Peter LeFrancke	95	Toyota Corolla	Peter LeFrancke
Dennis Martin	96	Holden LJ Torana GTR XU-1	Dennis Martin
Tony Farrell	99	Mazda RX-3	Tony Farrell

== Calendar ==
The championship was contested over seven rounds.

Rd.	Race title	Circuit	City / state	Date	Winner	Team	Report
1		Symmons Plains Raceway	Launceston, Tasmania	4 March	Peter Brock	Holden Dealer Team	
2		Calder Park Raceway	Melbourne, Victoria	17 March	Peter Brock	Holden Dealer Team	
3		Sandown International Raceway	Melbourne, Victoria	7 April	Allan Moffat	Allan Moffat Racing	
4		Amaroo Park	Sydney, New South Wales	14 April	Peter Brock	Holden Dealer Team	
5		Oran Park Raceway	Sydney, New South Wales	28 April	Ray Gulson	Canberra Speed Shop	
5		Oran Park Raceway	Sydney, New South Wales	28 April	Allan Moffat	Allan Moffat Racing	
6		Surfers Paradise International Raceway	Surfers Paradise, Queensland	19 May	Peter Brock	Holden Dealer Team	
7	Datsun Trophy	Adelaide International Raceway	Adelaide, South Australia	9 June	Peter Brock	Holden Dealer Team	

- Round 5 consisted of two separate races, one for over 3 litre cars and one for under 3 litre cars.

== Classes and points system ==
Cars were classified into one of two displacement classes:

- Up to and including 2,000 cc
- Over 2,000 cc

Points were awarded on a 9-6-4-3-2-1 basis to the first six place-getters in each class and on a 4-3-2-1 basis for the first four place-getters outright, irrespective of class.

== Championship standings ==
Pos.	Driver	Car	Sym.	Cal.	San.	Ama.	Ora.		Sur.	Ade.	Pts.
1	Peter Brock	Holden LJ Torana GTR XU-1; Holden LH Torana SL/R 5000	1st(13)	1st(13)	3rd(6)	1st(13)		2nd(9)	1st(13)	1st(13)	80
2	Bob Morris	Holden LJ Torana GTR XU-1		2nd(9)	4th(4)	2nd(9)		3rd(6)	2nd(9)	2nd(9)	46
3	Allan Moffat	Ford XB Falcon GT Hardtop	2nd(9)	4th(4)	1st(13)	9th		1st(13)			39
4	Bob Holden	Ford Escort GT1600		11th(4)	8th(9)	10th(9)	2nd(6)		Ret	(6)	34
5	Murray Carter	Ford XA Falcon GT Hardtop		3rd(6)	2nd(9)	7th		4th(4)	4th(4)	3rd(6)	29
5	Ray Gulson	Alfa Romeo 2000 GTV				(2)	1st(9)		8th(9)	11th(9)	29
7	Mel Mollison	Mazda RX-3	9th(6)	(2)	10th(4)	(3)	6th(1)		(4)	(4)	24
8	Roger Mahoney	Ford Escort GT1600	8th(9)		(3)					(3)	15
9	Barry Seton	Ford Escort GT1600		10th(6)	(1)	(6)	Ret				13
10	John French	Alfa Romeo 2000 GTV		9th(9)							9
10	Ray Harrison	Alfa Romeo 2000 GTV		(3)	9th(6)						9
12	Tony Niovanni	Holden LJ Torana GTR XU-1		5th(2)	5th(2)					4th(4)	8
13	Tim Smith	Holden LJ Torana GTR XU-1	3rd(6)								6
13	Colin Bond	Holden LJ Torana GTR XU-1				3rd(6)					6
13	Dick Johnson	Holden LJ Torana GTR XU-1							3rd(6)		6
13	Don Holland	Holden LJ Torana GTR XU-1		8th		4th(4)		5th(2)			6
13	John English	Ford Escort GT1600							(6)		6
13	Alan Cant	Ford Escort GT1600				(4)	5th(2)				6
19	Graham Parsons	Holden LJ Torana GTR XU-1	4th(4)	12th							4
19	Rod McRae	Holden LJ Torana GTR XU-1		6th(1)	6th(1)					5th(2)	4
19	Tony Watts	Morris Cooper S	(4)								4
19	Bernie Haehnle	Mazda RX-3					3rd(4)				4
22	John Gifford	Morris Cooper S	(3)								3
22	Roger Bonhomme	Holden LC Torana GTR					4th(3)				3
22	Lyndon Arnel	Ford Escort GT1600							(3)		3
25	Bob Jane	Holden LJ Torana GTR XU-1	5th(2)	Ret							2
25	Jim Hunter	Holden LJ Torana GTR XU-1				5th(2)		8th			2
25	Graeme Adams	Holden LJ Torana GTR XU-1						7th	5th(2)		2
25	Bob Forbes	Holden LJ Torana GTR XU-1				6th(1)			6th(1)		2
25	Geoff Wade	Ford Escort GT1600			(2)						2
25	Tom Heffernan	Holden Torana GTR							(2)		2
31	Richard Purtell	Holden LJ Torana GTR XU-1	6th(1)								1
31	Fred Gibson	Ford XB Falcon GT Hardtop				DNS		6th(1)			1
31	Graham Blanchard	Holden LJ Torana GTR XU-1	7th	7th						6th(1)	1
31	Phil Buda	Morris Cooper S							(1)		1
Pos	Driver	Car	Sym.	Cal.	San.	Ama.	Ora.		Sur.	Ade.	Pts

Colour	Result
Gold	Winner
Silver	Second place
Bronze	Third place
Green	Points classification
Blue	Non-points classification
Blue	Non-classified finish (NC)
Purple	Retired, not classified (Ret)
Red	Did not qualify (DNQ)
Red	Did not pre-qualify (DNPQ)
Black	Disqualified (DSQ)
White	Did not start (DNS)
White	Withdrew (WD)
White	Race cancelled (C)
Blank	Did not practice (DNP)
Blank	Did not arrive (DNA)
Blank	Excluded (EX)

Up to and including 2,000 cc class competitors
