= 1984 James Hardie 1000 =

Motor race in Australia

Seasons
- ← 1983 1985 →

Layout of the Mount Panorama Circuit (1938–1986)

The 1984 James Hardie 1000 was the 25th running of the Bathurst 1000 touring car race. It was held on 30 September 1984 at the Mount Panorama Circuit just outside Bathurst in New South Wales, Australia and was Round 4 of the 1984 Australian Endurance Championship. This race was celebrated as 'The Last of the Big Bangers', in reference to the Group C touring cars, which were competing at Bathurst for the last time.

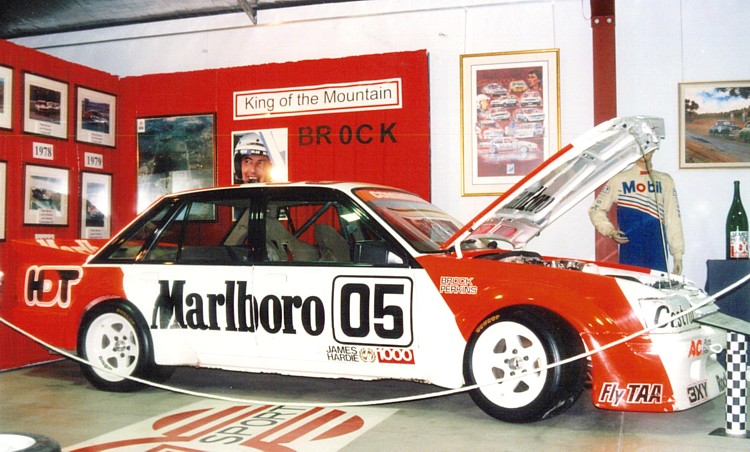
The race winning Brock/Perkins Holden Commodore

The race was won by Peter Brock and Larry Perkins driving a Holden VK Commodore for the Holden Dealer Team, the third consecutive victory for Brock, Perkins and the HDT. It was the most dominant team performance for the HDT in the history of the race as the team claimed a 1-2 finish with John Harvey and David Parsons backing up their team leaders by finishing second. Third place was taken by the Mazda RX-7 of Allan Moffat and Gregg Hansford. Moffat privately disputed the Harvey/Parsons Commodore finishing second as it had spent almost 3 laps in the pits mid-race with a gearbox problem, but saw little value in protesting as it would not win him the race so decided to settle for third.

The race also saw the first appearance of the international Group A cars at Bathurst (the category had made its Australian debut in the Castrol 500 at Sandown 3 weeks earlier). The Group A class was won by the TWR Mobil Rover Vitesse V8 of race rookies Jeff Allam from England and Armin Hahne from West Germany who finished 12th outright. Second in class and 15th outright was the JPS Team BMW 635 CSi of 1967 Formula One World Champion Denny Hulme and Bavarian Prince Leopold von Bayern. Third in Group A and 20th outright was the Barry Seton / Don Smith V8 Ford Mustang. For Seton, who had won the race outright in 1965, it would be his final start at Bathurst as he quietly retired from race driving at the end of 1984. Dick Johnson Racing, who started 4th on the grid with their Group C Ford XE Falcon, also entered a Mustang in the Group A category and although 1984 Australian Touring Car Champion Dick Johnson qualified the underpowered car in 48th, it was only there as insurance should there be a repeat of 1983 where he destroyed his Falcon in a famous Hardies Heroes crash and the Mustang, which Johnson had purchased from the German Zakspeed team, was officially withdrawn the day before the race.

== Class structure ==
=== Group C ===
This was the last Bathurst 1000 to include Group C Touring Cars, which had first contested the Bathurst 1000 in 1973. While a production based category, continual parity adjustments to keep the leading vehicles roughly at the same pace had seen the cars become wildly over-specified. That led to a decision by the Confederation of Australian Motor Sport (CAMS) in mid-1983 that Australian touring car racing would abandon its locally developed Group C rules and would be run under regulations based on the FIA's international Group A rules from 1 January 1985.

The major contenders in Group C were the V8-engined Ford Falcons and Holden Commodores, the lone V12 Jaguar XJ-S and 6 cylinder BMW 635 CSi, the rotary Mazda RX-7s, and the Nissan Bluebird turbos. Also running in Group C were the now outdated Chevrolet Camaro Z28s.

It would be the final Bathurst appearance for the American Camaro at Bathurst until 2023. It was also the final appearance for the pioneering turbo touring car in Australia, the Nissan Bluebird turbo which would be replaced in Group A in 1986 by the turbocharged Nissan Skyline DR30 RS.

After the car made its debut in the inaugural 500-mile race at Phillip Island in 1960, it would be the final Bathurst 1000 for the Ford Falcon until 1992. The Commodore (in various models), Jaguar, BMW and Mazda all saw action during the Group A years in Australia (1985–1992).

One car, the No.7 Qld Highway Patrol Racing Team Holden VK Commodore of Lester Smerdon and Wayne Park, ran in a mixed configuration. It ran the standard VK Commodore body that would be seen throughout 1985 in Group A, completely devoid of the front and rear spoilers and flared wheel guards as seen on the HDT, Roadways and Warren Cullen Group C VK's. However, the Queensland Police run car did use full Group C mechanicals (engine, transmission etc).

=== Group A ===
The international Group A formula was allowed to enter for the first time as a prelude to their adoption for Bathurst and the Australian Touring Car Championship in 1985. The Group A cars were closer to pure bred racing cars in concept (notably the allowing of the cars interior to be removed, as well as the cars having a lower ride height), but without the extensive performance modifications allowed for Group C. Without the performance upgrades, aerodynamic aids and larger tyres of the Group C cars, the Group A cars were much slower (the lead 3.5L V8 Rover Vitesse of Jeff Allam and Armin Hahne qualified 10 seconds slower than the pole time set by George Fury in the Nissan Bluebird turbo), and thus formed their own class. The low slung V8 Rovers did prove to be sensationally quick in a straight line though, with both cars being regularly recorded at over 240 km/h (149 mph) on Conrod Straight, putting them on par with many of the lower ranked privateer Commodores, Falcons and RX-7s. The Rover's main Group A challenger would be the BMW 635 CSi run by JPS Team BMW.

The other contenders in the Group A class included the Ford Mustang, Ford Capri Mk.III, Alfa Romeo GTV6, Toyota Sprinter AE86, Mitsubishi Starion, Audi 5+5, and Toyota Celica Supra.

== Hardies Heroes ==
Conditions on Mount Panorama were bitterly cold for the 1984 edition of Hardies Heroes with snow having fallen at the top of the circuit early in the morning. This saw a number of cars, notably the lighter (980 kg (2,160 lb)) Mazda RX-7's struggle to get sufficient heat into their tyres.

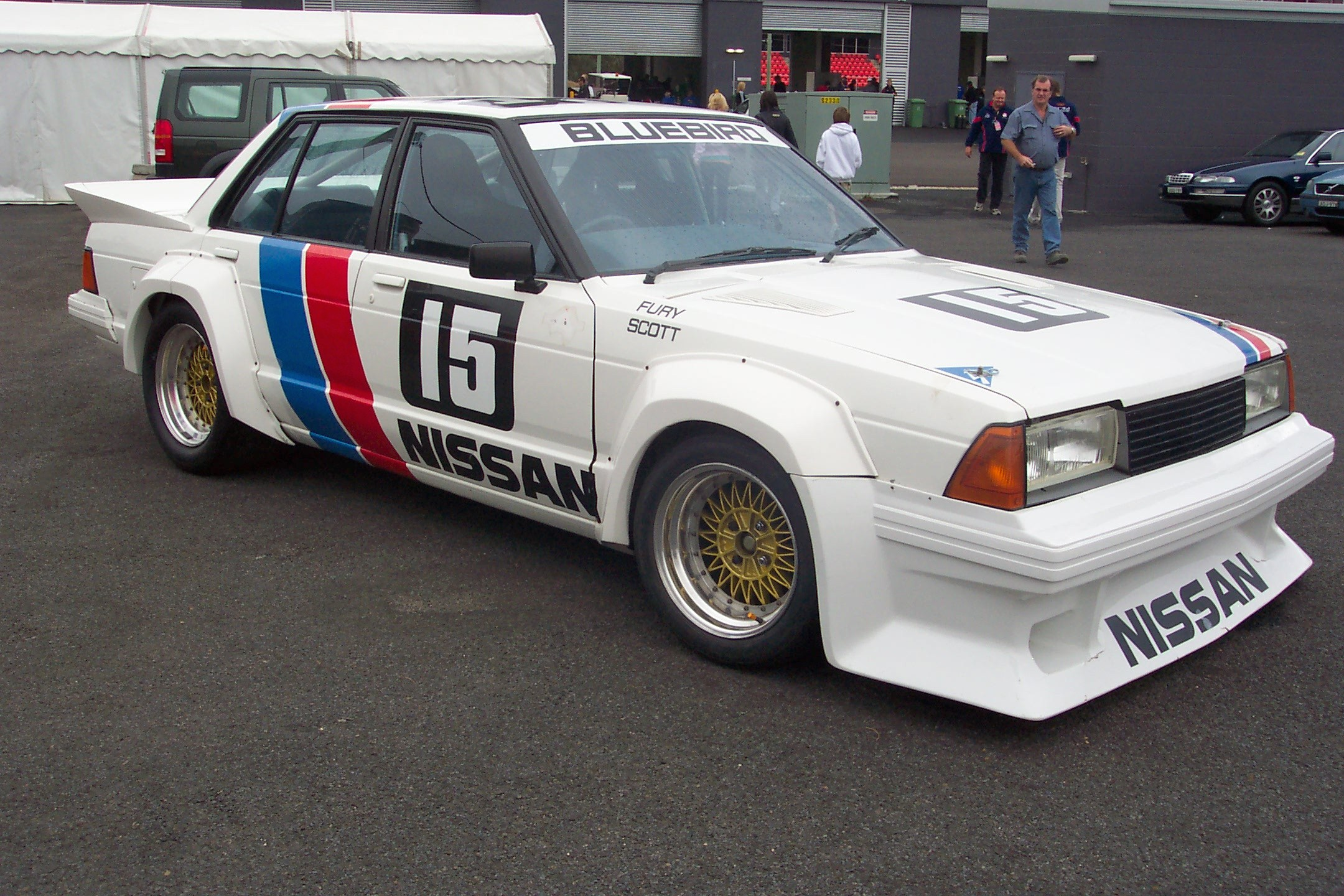
The pole winning Nissan Bluebird turbo as driven by George Fury (image from 2006)

Pos	No	Team	Driver	Car	HH	Qual
Pole	15	Nissan	(Australia) George Fury	Nissan Bluebird Turbo	2:13.850	2:14.81
2	05	Marlboro Holden Dealer Team	(Australia) Peter Brock	Holden VK Commodore	2:14.039	2:14.31
3	17	Palmer Tube Mills	(Australia) Dick Johnson	Ford XE Falcon	2:14.710	2:15.07
4	6	Roadways Racing	(Australia) Allan Grice	Holden VK Commodore	2:14.886	2:14.74
5	43	Peter Stuyvesant International Racing	(Canada) Allan Moffat	Mazda RX-7	2:16.411	2:15.54
6	31	JPS Team BMW	(New Zealand) Jim Richards	BMW 635 CSi	2:16.795	2:16.49
7	2	Masterton Homes Pty. Ltd.	(Australia) Steve Masterton	Ford XE Falcon	2:17.055	2:16.33
8	42	Peter Stuyvesant International Racing	(Australia) Gregg Hansford	Mazda RX-7	2:18.051	2:15.85
9	41	Chequered Flag Magazine	(Australia) Bob Morris	Mazda RX-7	2:18.107	2:16.05
10	12	John Goss Racing Pty. Ltd.	(United Kingdom) Tom Walkinshaw	Jaguar XJ-S	2:18.960	2:16.09

* Nissan scored the first ever Bathurst 1000 Pole Position by a car fitted with a turbocharger when George Fury recorded a time of 2:13.85 in his Nissan Bluebird Turbo. Fury's time in the runoff would not be beaten until 1991, ironically by another Nissan, the R32 GT-R. As it was the last year of Group C, Fury's time remains the fastest ever at Mt Panorama by a Group C touring car. Early morning snow on the mountain and the cold conditions were thought to favour the turbo over the V8 powered cars. Almost 20 years later Fred Gibson, who was by 1986 the Nissan team manager, confirmed that the Bluebirds had a turbo boost adjuster on the dashboard, used to tune boost pressure once track conditions were better understood in order to preserve the turbocharger.
* It was the first time in the seven-year history of Hardies Heroes that a V8 powered car did not claim Pole Position at Bathurst, and the first time since qualifying first counted for grid positions in 1967 that a V8 had not been on pole. It would be the start of a run of 8 pole positions in 9 years for turbo powered cars at Bathurst and a V8 powered car would not sit on pole again at Bathurst until 1993.
* The 1984 Hardies Heroes holds the Top 10 shootout record for the most number of marques competing with six with (in order) Nissan, Holden, Ford, Mazda, BMW and Jaguar represented. The record was equaled in both Super Touring races in 1997 and 1998.
* Jaguar became the 7th marque to represent in Hardies Heroes, making the first of only two appearances in the top ten runoff with Tom Walkinshaw (a Bathurst rookie despite being the 1984 European Touring Car Champion which included winning the 24 Hours of Spa in his own Group A Jaguar XJ-S) qualifying John Goss' V12 Jaguar XJ-S in 10th place. During qualifying (using one of TWR's more highly developed Group A V12 engines) the Jaguar had been recorded at 290 km/h (180 mph) on Conrod Straight, the fastest ever by a Touring Car before the addition of Caltex Chase in 1987. The next fastest cars were Dick Johnson's V8 Ford XE Falcon at 285 km/h (177 mph) and Peter Brock's V8 Holden VK Commodore at 280 km/h (174 mph).
* With three Mazda RX-7's in Hardies Heroes, 1984 was the only time Mazda had the greatest representation of cars in the Top Ten runoff. Not surprisingly the factory backed Peter Stuyvesant RX-7 of Allan Moffat was the quickest of the trio ending up 5th on the grid.
* 1984 was the only time either Steve Masterton and Gregg Hansford would appear in the Top 10 runoff.
* 1984 was also the last time that 1976 Hardie-Ferodo 1000 winner Bob Morris would appear in the runoff. After his impromptu Bathurst drive in 1983, Morris had come out of semi-retirement in 1984, purchasing the ex-Barry Jones Mazda RX-7 and actually winning the Oran Park round of the ATCC. Unfortunately, with the coming Group A being projected as more expensive than he believed he could manage, Morris would quietly retire from racing at the end of 1984.

== Official results ==
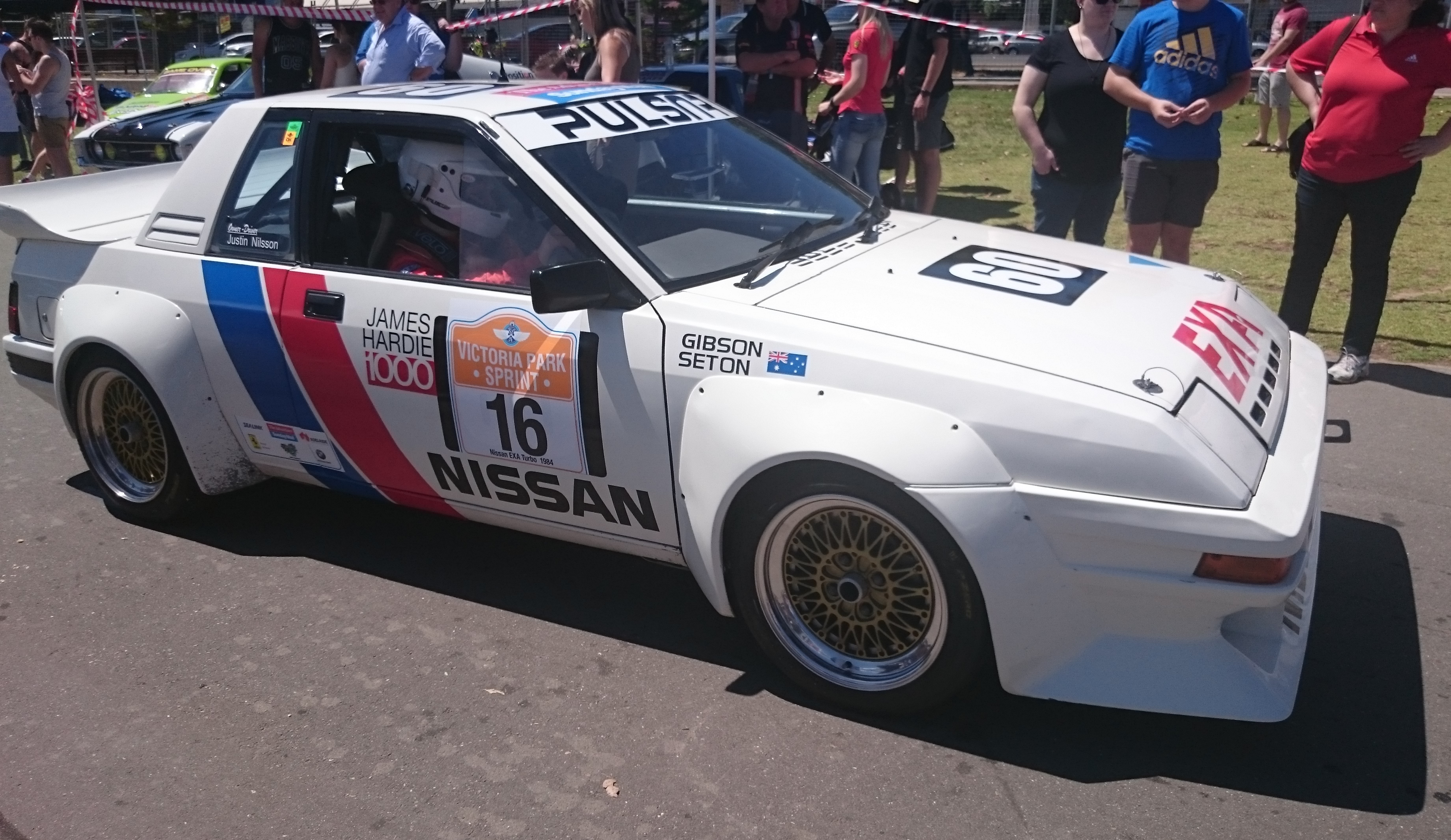
Christine Gibson & Glenn Seton drove a Nissan Pulsar EXA (image from 2015)

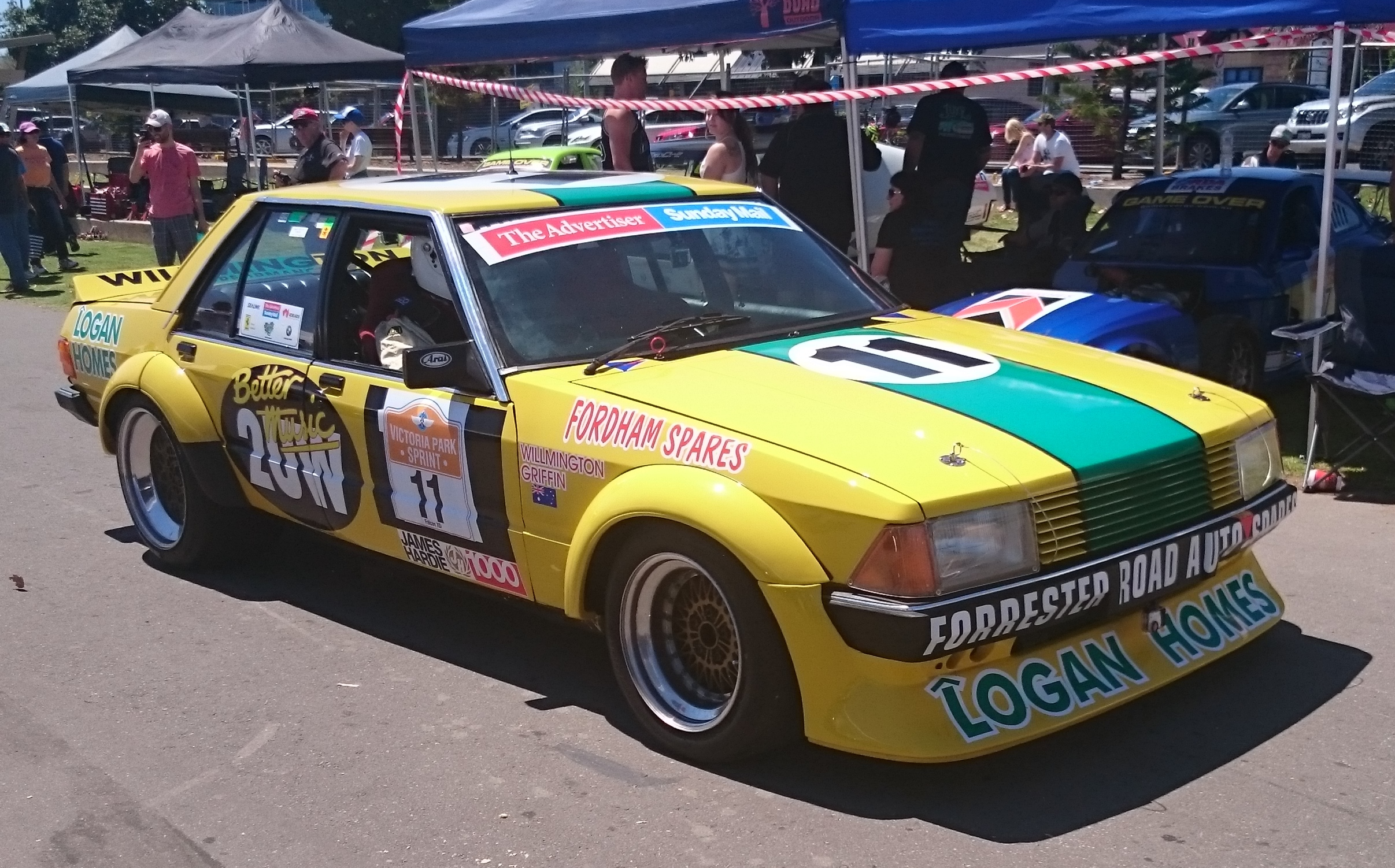
Garry Willmington & Mike Griffin drove a Ford XD Falcon (image from 2015)

Pos	Class	No	Team	Drivers	Car	Laps	Qual Pos	Shootout Pos
1	C	05	Marlboro Holden Dealer Team	(Australia) Peter Brock (Australia) Larry Perkins	Holden VK Commodore	163	1	2
2	C	25	Marlboro Holden Dealer Team	(Australia) John Harvey (Australia) David Parsons	Holden VK Commodore	161	12	
3	C	42	Peter Stuyvesant International Racing	(Australia) Gregg Hansford (Canada) Allan Moffat	Mazda RX-7	161	6	8
4	C	8	K-Mart Auto Racing	(Australia) Warren Cullen (Australia) Alan Jones	Holden VK Commodore	161	13	
5	C	28	Bayside Spare Parts	(Australia) Barry Lawrence (Australia) Alan Browne	Holden VH Commodore SS	158	17	
6	C	10	John Sands Racing	(Australia) Rusty French (Australia) Geoff Russell	Holden VH Commodore SS	154	31	
7	C	47	Brian Callaghan	(Australia) Barry Graham (Australia) Brian Callaghan	Ford XE Falcon	154	21	
8	C	33	Michael Burgmann	(Australia) Mike Burgmann (Australia) Bob Stevens	Mazda RX-7	153	39	
9	C	35	Goodyear Car Owners Club	(Australia) Ron Gillard (Australia) Mark Gibbs	Mazda RX-7	153	19	
10	C	27	Bryan Byrt Ford	(Australia) Alf Grant (Australia) Craig Harris	Ford XD Falcon	153	42	
11	C	52	Fred Geissler	(Australia) Fred Geissler (Australia) Ralph Radburn	Holden VH Commodore SS	153	27	
12	A	61	Mobil Rover Racing	(United Kingdom) Jeff Allam (West Germany) Armin Hahne	Rover Vitesse	152	36	
13	C	19	Ken Mathews Prestige Cars	(Australia) Ken Mathews (Australia) Greg Toepfer	Holden VH Commodore SS	151	32	
14	C	21	Lusty Engineering Pty. Ltd.	(Australia) Graham Lusty (Australia) John Lusty	Holden VH Commodore SS	148	35	
15	A	62	JPS Team BMW	(New Zealand) Denny Hulme (West Germany) Leopold von Bayern	BMW 635 CSi	148	49	
16	C	15	Nissan	(Australia) George Fury (Australia) Gary Scott	Nissan Bluebird Turbo	146	2	1
17	C	7	Qld Highway Patrol Racing Team	(Australia) Lester Smerdon (Australia) Wayne Park	Holden VK Commodore	145	53	
18	C	51	Tokico	(Australia) Tony Mulvihill (Australia) Brian Nightingale	Mazda RX-7	140	44	
19	C	37	Graham Stones	(Australia) Graham Stones (Australia) Ian Stones	Mazda RX-7	138	47	
20	A	69	Nu-Truck Spares	(Australia) Barry Seton (Australia) Don Smith	Ford Mustang	136	56	
21	A	65	Hulcraft Autos	(Australia) John Craft (Australia) Les Grose	Ford Capri Mk.III	135	60	
22	A	67	Ray Gulson	(Australia) Ray Gulson (Australia) Grant O'Donnell	Alfa Romeo GTV6	131	58	
23	C	24	Scotty Taylor Holden	(Australia) Alan Taylor (Australia) Kevin Kennedy	Holden VH Commodore SS	130	33	
24	C	45	James Keogh	(Australia) Bernie Stack (Australia) Wayne Clift (Australia) Terry Shiel	Holden VH Commodore SS	130	23	
25	C	38	Bayswater Auto Wreckers Pty. Ltd.	(Australia) Colin Campbell (New Zealand) John Faulkner	Holden VH Commodore SS	130	23	
26	A	73	Racing Car News	(Australia) Bob Holden (Australia) Alexandra Surplice	Toyota Sprinter AE86	125	63	
27	C	32	Berklee Exhausts	(Australia) Chris Clearihan (Australia) David Grose	Mazda RX-7	123	50	
28	A	63	Chris Heyer's Kingswood Import Centre	(Australia) Chris Heyer (Australia) Gerard Murphy	Audi 5+5	117	64	
29	A	60	Mobil Rover Racing	(United Kingdom) Steve Soper (Australia) Ron Dickson	Rover Vitesse	116	38	
DNF	C	13	Bruce Keith Smith	(Australia) Bruce Smith (New Zealand) Graeme Waswo	Holden VH Commodore SS	123	37	
NC	C	49	Kenmar Agency Pty. Ltd.	(Australia) John Donnelly (Australia) Simon Harrex	Ford XD Falcon	122	55	
DNF	C	22	P.F. Motor Racing	(Australia) Bryan Thomson (Australia) John Mann	Chevrolet Camaro Z28	121	45	
DNF	A	75	Laurie Hazelton	(Australia) Laurie Hazelton (Australia) Jerry Strauberg	Ford Capri Mk.III	119	62	
NC	C	30	Tony Kavich	(Australia) Tony Kavich (Australia) John Duggan	Mazda RX-7	117	43	
DNF	C	44	Chequered Flag Magazine	(Australia) Graham Moore (Australia) Peter McKay	Mazda RX-7	116	30	
NC	A	70	Network Alfa	(Australia) Colin Bond (Australia) Alfredo Costanzo	Alfa Romeo GTV6	111	52	
DNF	C	40	King George Tavern	(Australia) Joe Moore (Australia) Bob Muir	Ford XE Falcon	110	24	
DNF	C	3	Cadbury Schweppes Pty. Ltd.	(New Zealand) Peter Janson (Australia) Garry Rogers	Holden VH Commodore SS	109	16	
DNF	C	17	Palmer Tube Mills	(Australia) Dick Johnson (Australia) John French	Ford XE Falcon	107	3	3
DNF	C	26	Everlast Battery Service	(Australia) Bill O'Brien (Australia) Gary Cooke	Ford XD Falcon	104	28	
DNF	A	72	Toyota Team Australia	(Australia) John Smith (Australia) Stephen Brook	Toyota Sprinter AE86	100	57	
NC	C	41	Chequered Flag Magazine	(Australia) Bob Morris (Australia) Barry Jones	Mazda RX-7	97	7	9
NC	A	68	Greville Arnel	(Australia) Greville Arnel (Australia) Lyndon Arnel	Mitsubishi Starion Turbo	95	54	
DNF	C	29	Freedom Fence	(Australia) Paul Jones (Australia) Peter Hopwood	Ford XE Falcon	88	20	
NC	C	39	John Bundy	(Australia) John Bundy (Australia) Norm Carr	Mazda RX-7	83	34	
DNF	C	16	Nissan	(Australia) Christine Gibson (Australia) Glenn Seton	Nissan Pulsar EXA	76	26	
DNF	C	6	Roadways Racing	(Australia) Allan Grice (Australia) Steve Harrington	Holden VK Commodore	70	2	4
DNF	C	9	K-Mart Auto Racing	(Australia) Andrew Harris (Australia) Ron Harrop	Holden VH Commodore SS	51	18	
DNF	C	4	Terry Finnigan	(Australia) Terry Finnigan (Australia) Geoff Leeds	Holden VH Commodore SS	48	14	
DNF	C	31	JPS Team BMW	(New Zealand) Jim Richards (Australia) Tony Longhurst	BMW 635 CSi	39	10	6
DNF	C	50	Petrolon Slick 50	(Australia) Peter McLeod (Australia) Graeme Bailey	Mazda RX-7	39	15	
DNF	C	11	Magic Eleven	(Australia) Garry Willmington (Australia) Mike Griffin	Ford XD Falcon	37	41	
DNF	C	14	John English	(Australia) John English (Australia) Paul Gulson	Ford XD Falcon	34	29	
DNF	A	66	Equipe Sixty Six (Hong Kong)	(Australia) Kevin Bartlett (Australia) Peter Fitzgerald	Mitsubishi Starion Turbo	27	61	
DNF	C	20	Jim Keogh	(Australia) Jim Keogh (Australia) Terry Shiel	Holden VH Commodore SS	17	25	
DNF	C	2	Masterton Homes Pty. Ltd.	(Australia) Steve Masterton (Australia) Bruce Stewart	Ford XE Falcon	16	9	7
DNF	C	43	Peter Stuyvesant International Racing	(Canada) Allan Moffat (Australia) Gregg Hansford	Mazda RX-7	15	5	5
DNF	C	36	Roadways Racing	(Australia) Steve Harrington (Australia) Allan Grice	Holden VH Commodore SS	7	11	
DNF	A	64	Capri Components	(Australia) Lawrie Nelson (Australia) Peter Jones	Ford Mustang	1	59	
DNF	C	18	Valentine Greetings	(Australia) Murray Carter (Australia) John Murdern	Mazda RX-7	0	22	
DNF	C	12	John Goss Racing Pty. Ltd.	(Australia) John Goss (United Kingdom) Tom Walkinshaw	Jaguar XJ-S	0	8	10
DNF	C	34	Pennant Hills Suspension Centre	(Australia) John Tesoriero (Australia) Bob Tindal	Chevrolet Camaro Z28	0	46	
DNF	A	77	Peter Williamson Toyota	(Australia) Peter Williamson (Australia) Charlie O'Brien	Toyota Celica Supra	0	51	
DNS	A	71	Palmer Tube Mills	(Australia) Dick Johnson (Australia) John French	Ford Mustang		48	

== Notes ==
- Cars 12, 34 & 77 were involved in a start line accident when the #12 Jaguar XJ-S had clutch failure at the start. This caused the race to be stopped and for the first time in the races history there was a complete restart. All three cars failed to take the restart.
- Car 18 was involved in a separate accident during the first lap of the initial race being shunted off the track and into a fence on Conrod Straight by another car not heeding the red flags and was also unable to front for the second start.
- Cars 2 & 43 were also involved in a separate incident at the start with both cars bouncing off each other and the #43 also bouncing off the pit wall. #43 was out with engine failure after 15 laps, while #2 crashed at Forrest's Elbow one lap later.
- Car 7 was a Holden VK Commodore which used Group C running gear including the engine and gearbox, but unlike the VK's from the Holden Dealer Team, Roadways Racing and K-Mart Racing, car 7 used the VK's Group A body which did not include the aerodynamic front and rear spoilers or the flared tyre guards.

== Statistics ==
- Provisional Pole Position - #05 Peter Brock - 2:14.31
- Pole Position - #15 George Fury - 2:13.850 (record)
- Fastest Group A qualifier - #61 Jeff Allam - 2:23.41
- Fastest Lap (Group C) - #05 Peter Brock - 2:15.13 (lap record)
- Fastest Lap (Group A) - #60 - Steve Soper 2:24.87 (class lap record)
- Winners average speed - 157.5 km/h (record)
- Race Time - 6:23:13.06 (record)
- Number of Entrants - 64 (record)
