= Ron Hodgson Motors =

Ron Hodgson Racing
- Manufacturer: Jaguar, Holden, Triumph, Ford
- Team Principal: Bruce Richardson; Ron Missen
- Team Manager: Ron Hodgson
- Race Drivers: (Australia) Ron Hodgson (Australia) Charlie Smith (Australia) John French (Australia) Bob Beasely (Australia) Bruce McPhee (Australia) Bob Morris (Australia) John Leffler (Australia) Frank Gardner (Australia) James Laing-Peach (Australia) Graham Moore (United Kingdom) John Fitzpatrick (Australia) Ron Dickson (New Zealand) Graeme Lawrence (United States) Johnny Rutherford (United States) Janet Guthrie (United Kingdom) Derek Bell (Austria) Dieter Quester
- Chassis: Jaguar Mk.II; Holden LJ Torana GTR XU-1; Holden LH Torana SL/R 5000 L34; Triumph Dolomite; Ford Capri; Holden LX Torana SL/R 5000 A9X; Holden LX Torana SS A9X Hatchback
- Debut: 1960; 66 years ago
- Drivers' Championships: 1 (1979)
- Round wins: 7

Ron Hodgson Motors (later known as Ron Hodgson Channel 7 Racing) was a Parramatta-based car dealership, primarily associated with Holden. One of the largest dealerships of its kind in Australia, on several occasions it lent its name and facilities to support motor racing teams. It did this initially as the base for the racing efforts of its own principal dealer, Ron Hodgson, who first raced Jaguars in the early days of the Australian Touring Car Championship. In the 1970s, it became the front for Hodgson's protege, Bob Morris. With Morris at the wheel, the team became best known for winning the Bathurst 1000 in 1976 and the Australian Touring Car Championship in 1979.

== Racing history ==
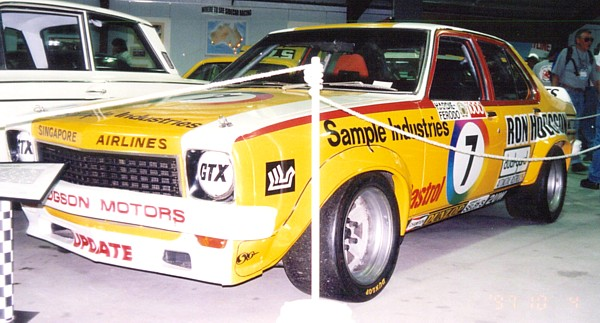
The 1976 Hardie-Ferodo 1000-winning Holden LH Torana SL/R 5000 L34

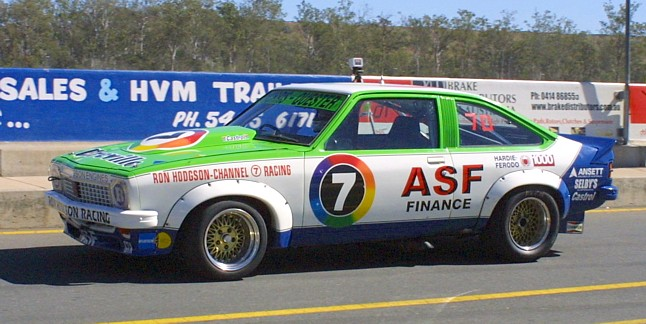
Bob Morris' 1979 championship-winning Holden LX Torana SS 5000 A9X.

The independent one-car team was formed by Ron Hodgson, who ran the team from his dealership in the west of Sydney. Hodgson himself had finished third in both the 1960 and 1961 Australian Touring Car Championships as well as entering the Bathurst 500 between 1963 and 1966. After running Bruce McPhee in the major endurance races in 1972, the team aligned with Bob Morris for a partial campaign of the 1973 Australian Touring Car Championship, also receiving sponsorship from the Seven Network. In 1974 Morris finished second in the championship, but did not win his first championship rounds until 1975. Morris, driving with Frank Gardner, then finished second at the 1975 Hardie-Ferodo 1000. In 1976 and 1977, the team also experimented with a Triumph Dolomite Sprint instead of the V8 Torana, attempting to maximise the championship points by winning smaller capacity class in some races. In conjunction with Leyland Australia, the team had in fact aimed to develop a locally made competition version of the Dolomite Sprint but the proposal was rejected by the Confederation of Australian Motor Sport.

The team recruited British driver John Fitzpatrick to drive with Morris in the 1976 Hardie-Ferodo 1000 and the duo were able to conquer the event, limping home in dramatic circumstances thanks to a leaking oil seal resulting in smoke pouring from the car in the closing laps. The race result remains disputed by some due to the suggestion that the second-placed Holden Dealer Team entry of Colin Bond and John Harvey should have won the race due to a timing error. The result was allegedly not protested on the day due to the public relations issues of Hodgson being a leading Holden car dealer, however Bob Morris maintains to this day that the result was correct.

The following year, the Seven Network increased their sponsorship and the team became known as Ron Hodgson Channel 7 Racing. After a difficult 1977 season, Morris matched his and the team's best championship result in 1978 with a runner-up result behind Peter Brock in the official Holden Dealer Team. Morris had in fact scored equal points to Brock but lost the title due to the requirement that only the best six scores counted to the championship totals. In another close battle, Morris narrowly defeated Brock to win the 1979 title. This meant the team had outperformed the HDT, which had markedly more resources and staff, in the same car over a full season. Having achieved his aims within the sport, Hodgson folded his team before the 1980 season.

Between 1975 and 1978, the team also entered a second car at the Bathurst 1000. In the 1975 and 1976 races the team ran a Triumph Dolomite Sprint, which achieved a top ten result in 1975. In 1977 and 1978 the team ran international drivers for their second car, this time with a Holden Torana to match their lead car. In 1977 the team ran an all-American line-up consisting of the then two-time Indianapolis 500 champion Johnny Rutherford and Janet Guthrie, and in 1978 a European line-up of the then one-tine 24 Hours of Le Mans winner Derek Bell and Dieter Quester.

== Bathurst 1000 Win ==
Year	Class	No	Drivers	Chassis	Laps	Grid	Qualifying / Shootout
Year	Class	No	Drivers	Engine	Laps	Grid	Qualifying / Shootout
1976	3001cc - 6000cc	7	(Australia) Bob Morris (United Kingdom) John Fitzpatrick	Holden LH Torana SL/R 5000 L34	163	4	2:26.4 (Top 10)
1976	3001cc - 6000cc	7	(Australia) Bob Morris (United Kingdom) John Fitzpatrick	Holden 308 5.0 L V8	163	4	2:26.4 (Top 10)

== Championship / Series wins ==
Year	Championship or Series	Driver	Car
1979	Australian Touring Car Championship	Bob Morris	Holden LX Torana SS 5000 A9X
1979	Rothmans AMSCAR Series	Bob Morris	Holden LX Torana SS 5000 A9X
