= 1979 Australian Touring Car Championship =

Motor racing competition

Seasons
- ← 1978 1980 →

The 1979 Australian Touring Car Championship was a CAMS sanctioned Australian motor racing title open to Group C Touring Cars. It began at Symmons Plains and ended at Adelaide International Raceway after eight rounds. The title, which was the 20th Australian Touring Car Championship, was won by Bob Morris driving a Holden Torana.

1979 was the first time since the ATCC went to a championship series in 1969 rather than the single race it had been previously that a single make and model car had won all rounds of the championship with all 8 rounds being won by the Holden LX Torana SS A9X Hatchback. Including the current season (2016), such a single car domination has only happened once since in the series, that being when the Ford Sierra RS500 won all rounds of the 1988 championship.

== Calendar ==
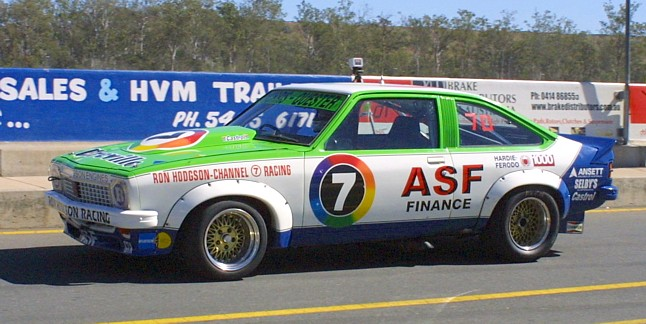
The Holden Torana of 1979 Australian Touring Car Champion Bob Morris

The 1979 Australian Touring Car Championship was contested over an eight-round series.

| Rd. | Race title | Circuit | City / state | Date | Winning driver | Car | Team |
|---|---|---|---|---|---|---|---|
| 1 | Symmons Plains | Symmons Plains | Launceston, Tasmania | 4 March | John Harvey | Holden LX Torana SS 5000 A9X | Marlboro Holden Dealer Team |
| 2 | Calder | Calder Park Raceway | Melbourne, Victoria | 18 March | Peter Brock | Holden LX Torana SS 5000 A9X | Marlboro Holden Dealer Team |
| 3 | Oran Park | Oran Park | Sydney, New South Wales | 25 March | Bob Morris | Holden LX Torana SS 5000 A9X | Ron Hodgson Channel 7 Racing |
| 4 | Sandown | Sandown Park | Melbourne, Victoria | 7 April | Bob Morris | Holden LX Torana SS 5000 A9X | Ron Hodgson Channel 7 Racing |
| 5 | Wanneroo | Wanneroo Park | Perth, Western Australia | 6 May | Peter Brock | Holden LX Torana SS 5000 A9X | Marlboro Holden Dealer Team |
| 6 | Surfers Paradise | Surfers Paradise | Surfers Paradise, Queensland | 20 May | Peter Brock | Holden LX Torana SS 5000 A9X | Marlboro Holden Dealer Team |
| 7 | Lakeside | Lakeside | Brisbane, Queensland | 22 June | Bob Morris | Holden LX Torana SS 5000 A9X | Ron Hodgson Channel 7 Racing |
| 8 | The Breville Trophy | Adelaide International Raceway | Adelaide, South Australia | 28 July | Bob Morris | Holden LX Torana SS 5000 A9X | Ron Hodgson Channel 7 Racing |

- Round 3 of the championship at Oran Park featured two separate races, the first for Under 3 litre cars and the second for Over 3 litre cars.

== Teams and drivers ==
The following teams and drivers competed in the 1979 Australian Touring Car Championship.

| Team | Car | No | Driver |
|---|---|---|---|
| King George Tavern | Holden LX Torana SS 5000 A9X | 2 | (Australia) Fred Gibson |
| Marlboro Holden Dealer Team | Holden LX Torana SS 5000 A9X | 4 | (Australia) Wayne Negus |
| Marlboro Holden Dealer Team | Holden LX Torana SS 5000 A9X | 05 | (Australia) Peter Brock |
| Marlboro Holden Dealer Team | Holden LX Torana SS 5000 A9X | 76 | (Australia) John Harvey |
| Craven Mild Racing | Holden LX Torana SS 5000 A9X | 6 | (Australia) Allan Grice |
| Ron Hodgson Channel 7 Racing | Holden LX Torana SS 5000 A9X | 7 | (Australia) Bob Morris |
| Citizen Watches | Holden LX Torana SL/R 5000 A9X | 11 | (Australia) Gary Cooke |
| Pioneer Car Stereo | Ford XB Falcon GT Hardtop | 12 | (Australia) Ron Dickson |
| Cadbury-Schweppes | Holden LX Torana SS 5000 A9X | 15 | (New Zealand) Peter Janson |
| Bryan Byrt Ford | Ford XC Falcon Cobra | 17 | (Australia) Dick Johnson |
| Brian Wood Ford Pty Ltd | Ford XC Falcon | 18 | (Australia) Murray Carter |
| Brian Wood Ford Pty Ltd | Ford XC Falcon | 66 | (Australia) Rod Stevens |
| Brian Wood Ford Pty Ltd | Ford Escort RS2000 | 69 | Rod Stevens |
| Gown-Hindaugh; Roadways Racing | Holden LX Torana SS 5000 A9X | 20 | (Australia) Garth Wigston |
| Gown-Hindaugh; Roadways Racing | Holden LX Torana SL/R 5000 A9X | 21 | (Australia) Charlie O'Brien |
| Colin Hall | Holden LX Torana SS 5000 A9X | 21 | (Australia) Colin Hall |
| Tim Slako | Holden LX Torana SS 5000 A9X | 22 | (Australia) Tim Slako |
| Warren Cullen | Holden LX Torana SS 5000 A9X | 23 | Warren Cullen |
| Alan Browne | Holden LX Torana SL/R 5000 A9X | 24 | (Australia) Alan Browne |
| Allan Moffat Racing | Ford XC Falcon Cobra | 25 | (Canada) Allan Moffat |
| Marshall Brewer | Holden LX Torana SS 5000 A9X | 27 | (Australia) Marshall Brewer |
| Ron Wanless | Ford XC Falcon Cobra | 27 | (Australia) Ron Wanless |
| Ray Allford | Ford XC Falcon Cobra | 28 | Ray Allford |
| Rod Donovan | Ford XC Falcon | 28 | Rod Donovan |
| Garry Willmington | Ford XC Falcon | 29 | (Australia) Garry Willmington |
| Bill O'Brien | Ford XC Falcon | 30 | (Australia) Bill O'Brien |
| Greater Pacific Finance | Holden LX Torana SS 5000 A9X | 33 | (Australia) Garry Rogers |
| Bill Evans | Ford Escort | 36 | (Australia) Bill Evans |
| Scotty Taylor Holden | Holden LH Torana SLR5000 L34 | 37 | Alan Taylor |
| Greg Smelt | Holden LH Torana SLR5000 L34 | 38 | Greg Smelt |
| Terry Shiel | Mazda RX-3 | 39 | (Australia) Terry Shiel |
| Ross Burbidge | Mazda RX-3 | 40 | (Australia) Ross Burbidge |
| Larry Kogge | Mazda RX-3 | 41 | Larry Kogge |
| Geoff Leeds | Ford Capri V6 | 43 | (Australia) Geoff Leeds |
| Alan Bryant | Mazda RX-3 | 45 | Alan Bryant |
| Ray Farrar | Ford Capri V6 | 46 | Ray Farrar |
| Barry Jones | Mazda RX-3 | 47 | (Australia) Barry Jones |
| K.Kemp | Mazda RX-3 | 48 | K.Kemp |
| Capri Components | Ford Capri Mk I | 50 | (Australia) Lawrie Nelson |
| Terry Daly | Ford Capri V6 | 51 | Terry Daly |
| Masterton Homes | Ford Capri V6 | 52 | (Australia) Steve Masterton |
| Ray Cutchie | Ford Capri Mk I | 53 | (Australia) Ray Cutchie |
| Roger Cartwright | Ford Escort RS2000 Mk 1 | 54 | (Australia) Roger Cartwright |
| Craig Volkers | Ford Capri V6 | 55 | (Australia) Craig Volkers |
| Martin Power | Triumph Dolomite Sprint | 56 | (Australia) Martin Power |
| David Cannon | Ford Escort RS2000 | 58 | (Australia) David Cannon |
| T.Homeyer | Ford Capri V6 | 59 | T.Homeyer |
| Peter Kuebler | Alfa Romeo 2000 GTV | 62 | (Australia) Peter Kuebler |
| Ian Chilman | Mazda RX-3 | 62 | (Australia) Ian Chilman |
| Ray Gulson | Alfa Romeo 2000 GTV | 64 | (Australia) Ray Gulson |
| Graeme Hooley | Holden LX Torana SS 5000 A9X | 71 | Graeme Hooley |
| John Gates | Mazda RX-3 | 72 | John Gates |
| Brian Hall | Toyota Celica | 74 | (Australia) Brian Hall |
| David Bail | Ford Escort RS2000 | 75 | (Australia) David Bail |
| Peter Williamson P/L | Toyota Celica | 77 | (Australia) Peter Williamson |
| John Faulkner | Ford Capri V6 | 79 | John Faulkner |
| Ric Rossiter | Holden LH Torana SLR5000 L34 | 87 | Ric Rossiter |
| Ray Kaleda | Holden LX Torana SS 5000 A9X | 97 | Ray Kaleda |
| Bob Shepherd | Holden LH Torana SLR5000 L34 | 99 | Bob Shepherd |

== Classes ==
For championship points allocation purposes, cars competed in two displacement classes:

- Up to and including 3000 cc
- 3001 to 6000 cc

== Points system ==
Championship points were awarded on a 9,6,4,3,2,1 basis to the first six placegetters in each class and on a 4,3,2,1 basis to the first four placegetters irrespective of class (at each round). Only the best seven results counted towards the total (for each driver).

== Championship results ==
| Pos. | Driver | Rd 1 | Rd 2 | Rd 3 | | Rd 4 | Rd 5 | Rd 6 | Rd 7 | Rd 8 | Pts. |
|---|---|---|---|---|---|---|---|---|---|---|---|
| 1 | Bob Morris | 4th(4) | 2nd(9) | | 1st(13) | 1st(13) | 4th(4) | 4th((4)) | 1st(13) | 1st(13) | 69 (73) |
| 2 | Peter Brock | 5th(2) | 1st(13) | | 3rd(6) | 3rd(6) | 1st(13) | 1st(13) | 5th((2)) | 2nd(9) | 62 (64) |
| 3 | John Harvey | 1st{13) | 3rd(6) | | 4th(4) | 6th((1)) | 2nd(9) | 3rd(6) | 2nd(9) | 3rd(6) | 53 (54) |
| 4 | Peter Williamson* | 8th(6) | | DNS | | (9) | 6th(9) | | 8th(9) | | 33 |
| 5 | Charlie O'Brien | | | | 5th(2) | 2nd(9) | | 2nd(9) | 3rd(6) | | 26 |
| 5 | Roger Cartwright* | 9th(4) | (1) | 5th(2) | | (4) | | | (6) | (9) | 26 |
| 7 | Allan Grice | 3rd(6) | Ret | | 2nd(9) | Ret | 3rd(6) | DNS | | | 21 |
| 8 | Garth Wigston | 2nd(9) | 6th(1) | | | 4th(4) | | | | 4th(4) | 18 |
| 8 | Lawrie Nelson* | 7th(9) | Ret | 1st{9) | | DSQ | | | | | 18 |
| 10 | Brian Hall* | | | | | | | (9) | (3) | | 12 |
| 10 | Steve Masterton* | | (6) | 2nd(6) | | DNS | | DSQ | | | 12 |
| 12 | John Faulkner* | | (4) | | | (6) | | | | | 10 |
| 12 | Craig Volkers* | | | | | | | (6) | (4) | | 10 |
| 14 | Bill Evans* | | (9) | | | | | | | | 9 |
| 15 | Ray Cutchie* | | | | | | | | | (6) | 6 |
| 16 | Peter Janson | | 4th(4) | | | | | 6th(1) | | | 5 |
| 17 | Bill O'Brien | | | | | | | | 4th(4) | | 4 |
| 17 | Geoff Leeds | | | 3rd(4) | | | | | | | 4 |
| 17 | David Bail | | | | | | | | | 4 | 4 |
| 17 | Ross Burbidge* | | 4th(3) | 6th(1) | | | | | | | 1 |
| 21 | Gary Cooke | | | | 6th(1) | | | | | (2) | 3 |
| 21 | Ray Gulson* | 10th(3) | | | | | | | | | 3 |
| 21 | Barry Jones* | | | 4th(3) | | | | | | | 3 |
| 21 | Larry Kogge* | | | | | (3) | | | | | 3 |
| 21 | Peter Kuebler* | | | | | | | | | (3) | 3 |
| 21 | Martin Power* | (2) | | | | (1) | | | | | 3 |
| 27 | Garry Rogers | | 5th(2) | | | | | | | | 2 |
| 27 | Allan Moffat | | Ret | | Ret | 5th(2) | | | | | 2 |
| 27 | Tim Slako | | | | | | 5th(2) | | | | 2 |
| 27 | Dick Johnson | | | | | | | 5th(2) | 7th | | 2 |
| 27 | Ray Farrar* | | (2) | | | | | | | | 2 |
| 27 | Ian Chilman* | | | | | (2) | | | | | 2 |
| 33 | Rod Stevens | (1) | | Ret | | | | | | | 1 |
| 33 | Colin Hall | | | | | | (1) | | | | 1 |
| 33 | Garry Willmington | | | | | | | | 6th(1) | | 1 |
| 33 | Murray Carter | | | | | | | | | 6th(1) | 1 |
| 33 | David Cannon* | (1) | | | | | | | | | 1 |
| Pos | Driver | Rd 1 | Rd 2 | Rd 3 | | Rd 4 | Rd 5 | Rd 6 | Rd 7 | Rd 8 | Total |

| Colour | Result |
|---|---|
| Gold | Winner |
| Silver | Second place |
| Bronze | Third place |
| Green | Points classification |
| Blue | Non-points classification |
| Blue | Non-classified finish (NC) |
| Purple | Retired, not classified (Ret) |
| Red | Did not qualify (DNQ) |
| Red | Did not pre-qualify (DNPQ) |
| Black | Disqualified (DSQ) |
| White | Did not start (DNS) |
| White | Withdrew (WD) |
| White | Race cancelled (C) |
| Blank | Did not practice (DNP) |
| Blank | Did not arrive (DNA) |
| Blank | Excluded (EX) |

- Drivers marked with a * competed in the under 3000 cc class.
