= Bob Morris (racing driver) =

Australian former racing driver

- Nationality: Australian
- Born: Robert Morris; 4 October 1948 (age 78) Sydney, New South Wales
- Retired: 1984

Australian Touring Car Championship
- Years active: 1973–84
- Teams: Ron Hodgson Motors; Craven Mild Racing; Alan Jones Racing; Barry Jones
- Wins: 9
- Best finish: 1st in 1979 Australian Touring Car Championship

Championship titles
- 1976 1979: Bathurst 1000; Australian Touring Car Champ.

Awards
- 2004: V8 Supercars Hall of Fame

Robert Morris (born 4 October 1948) is an Australian former racing driver. Morris was one of the leading touring car drivers during the 1970s and continued racing until 1984. Morris won Australia's premier Touring car race, the Bathurst 1000 in 1976. He also won the Australian Touring Car Championship in 1979. Morris was inducted into the V8 Supercars Hall of Fame in 2004.

== Early years ==
Morris got his early start in racing through his father Ray Morris who was racing at the time in early sports sedan racing with a modified Ford Falcon. Bob Morris made his Bathurst 1000 debut in 1968 driving a Toyota Corolla with Bruce Hindhaugh in the team backed by Australian Toyota importers AMI that his father Ray also drove for. Morris and Hindhaugh won their class. Morris again registered a class win the following year with Brian Sampson, again in an AMI Corolla.

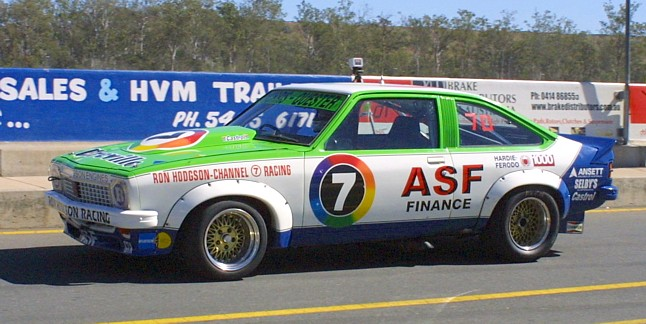
Bob Morris' championship-winning Holden Torana.

In 1970, spotted by team boss Harry Firth, Morris was picked up by the Holden Dealer Team. He was paired with the HDT's other young charger, Peter Brock in a Torana GTR XU-1 but a troubled race saw them finish well back in the field. 1971 saw Morris paired with father Ray, taking out fastest lap at Bathurst in a Ford Falcon GTHO but the family team retired early, the big Ford overheating.

In 1973, Morris received backing from Sydney car dealer Ron Hodgson Motors and the Seven TV Network for his Torana GTR XU-1 campaign. In the 1973 and 1974 seasons, Morris was very competitive in the Sun-7 Chesterfield Series at Amaroo Park driving against the Holden Dealer Team's Colin Bond and other top Sydney drivers. Then in 1975, he won his first Touring Car Championship round at Amaroo.

== 1976 Bathurst victory ==
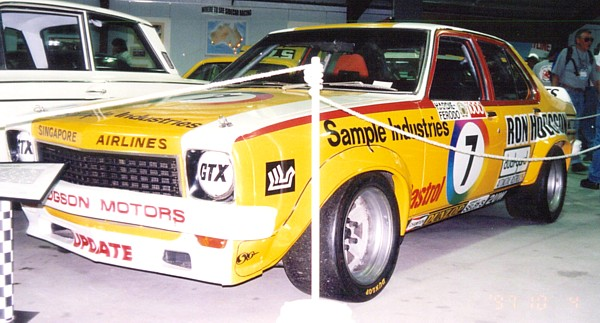
The 1976 Bathurst winning Holden Torana

In 1975, Morris finished second at Bathurst in the Ron Hodgson Torana SL/R5000 L34 with co-driver Frank Gardner. The following year Morris, with British touring car ace John Fitzpatrick as co-driver, went one better – winning in a dramatic finish at Bathurst. In the final laps of the 1976 race, Fitzpatrick nursed home the ailing Morris Torana which was trailing smoke. Rival Torana driver Colin Bond was within striking distance of the lead if Fitzpatrick had to pit and there were emotional scenes as chief Ron Hodgson team mechanic, Bruce Richardson, slumped disconsolately in the pits seemingly resigned to seeing victory snatched from the team's grasp. Meanwhile, a nervous Morris paced up and down the pits with fingers crossed but the slowing Ron Hodgson Torana managed to make it to the finish line first with Bond in second place on the same lap.

Many believed that Fitzpatrick had nursed home the Torana after it had suffered a broken axle, and indeed this was reported as the reason for the car almost failing to finish. Fitzpatrick later set the record straight when he revealed that a leaking oil seal (which was the cause of the smoke) was making the clutch slip badly. This made it much harder to accelerate the car to the top of the mountain, especially out of The Cutting which is one of the slowest and steepest corners on the circuit.

In 1987, motoring writer Bill Tuckey in his book The Rise and Fall of Peter Brock claimed that there had been a lap scoring error in the 1976 race and that Colin Bond's Torana was the first car to complete the distance. Tuckey claimed that Holden declined to challenge the result because a privately entered Holden team had won in such a memorable, emotional finish. He also claimed it was because Morris' major sponsor was Ron Hodgson Motors, one of Sydney's leading Holden dealerships at the time, and Holden didn't want to sour relations with Hodgson. It remains however a contested footnote, Morris denies that this was the case, claiming every other team lap scorers other than the HDT agreed that the results posted by the Australian Racing Drivers Club (ARDC) were correct. Despite this, Bond's co-driver John Harvey believed until his death in 2020 (aged 82) that he and Bond did indeed win the race, despite the official result still showing Morris and Fitzpatrick as race winners.

== Touring Car Champion ==
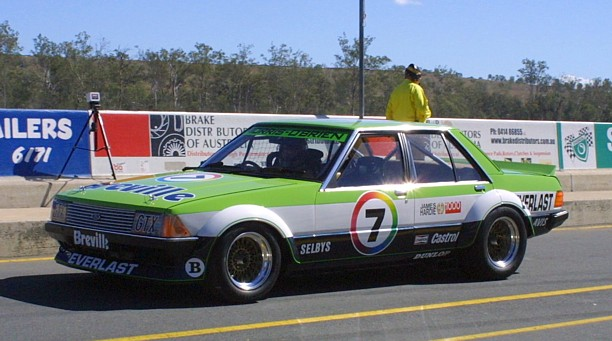
Morris/O'Brien/Moffat 1980 Bathurst Falcon

In 1979, Morris, in an A9X Torana, won a hard-fought Australian Touring Car Championship title ahead of Holden Dealer Team driver Peter Brock. Morris also won the AMSCAR Series, run at Amaroo Park (in a one-off appearance, Morris had a new team mate for the opening round of the AMSCAR series, long time Ford driver Allan Moffat). At the Bathurst 1000 that year, Morris was second fastest qualifier but Brock, in his new A9X Torana, ran away from the field at the start of the race, leading every lap of the event showing the superiority of the HDT by setting the races fastest lap (also the lap record at the time) on the very last lap of the race. Hodgson, having seen his team beat the HDT to the Touring Car title, withdrew from racing, having achieved all he had set out to do. Morris was re-united with Frank Gardner, who was team manager of Allan Grice's Craven Mild Racing team. Morris helped develop a new Holden VC Commodore during the Touring Car Championship, but by the enduros he had left the team and raced Bill O'Brien's Ford XD Falcon during the 1980 endurance season, including the 1980 Hardie-Ferodo 1000 where the Falcon carried one of Channel 7's Racecam units.

== Collision at 1981 Bathurst ==
Morris was involved in a dramatic collision at the notorious McPhillamy Park corner during the 1981 Bathurst 1000. Morris' Falcon, when running in second place, came together with the Falcon of Christine Gibson leading to a six car pile-up that blocked the track. The other cars involved were the Commodores of Garry Rogers and Tony Edmondson, the Gemini of David Seldon and the pole winning Chevrolet Camaro Z28 of Kevin Bartlett, with others such as John Goss in his Jaguar XJS narrowly avoiding the accident by stopping in time. As the track was blocked and the race had gone past 75% of the full distance, the officials declared the race over 43 laps short of the full distance (race regulations did not allow for a restart) and so the Morris/Fitzpatrick car was awarded second place behind the similar Falcon of Dick Johnson and John French. The crash though would have repercussions for Morris' racing career. Morris would have balance issues that affected his ability to race, but the talent was always there.

1982 would see a two car 'super team' with 1980 Formula One World Champion Alan Jones, but with the two drivers steering different cars, Morris a V8 powered Ford XE Falcon, Jones a rotary powered Mazda RX-7. The partnership dissolved at the end of the 1982 season, in particular after a disappointing Bathurst which saw the very competitive Falcon badly damaged in a crash on Saturday afternoon by his co-driver John Fitzpatrick when a wheel broke and sent the car into a concrete wall, the car irreparable for the Sunday morning start, though Morris would line up in his grid position during the pre-race sitting in a chair with four wheels surrounding him. The other reason for the end of the team was Jones' decision to make an abortive comeback to Formula One in 1983.

Morris made a comeback to motor racing at the 1983 James Hardie 1000. Originally, he had planned to enter a Holden VH Commodore SS, but negotiations to buy the spare Holden Dealer Team car fell through only weeks before the race. He went to Bathurst anyway, only as a spectator (though with his driving suit and helmet, just in case), but was offered the drive in the Commodore to be driven by its owner Rusty French, and former Re-Car team owner Allan Browne. Never a serious racer and admittedly uncomfortable in the car, Browne spotted Morris in the pits and after talking to him offered to step aside to allow the 1976 winner to race. Despite not having previously driven the car, Morris was immediately 6.3 seconds faster than French and managed to move the car from 31st to tenth in qualifying, enough to qualify for Hardies Heroes. He would eventually start ninth following the Hardies Heroes crash of Dick Johnson who destroyed his Greens-Tuf XE Falcon at Forrest's Elbow. Incredibly, thanks to some car swapping, Johnson started the race from tenth position in a replacement Falcon which was re-built overnight. Ironically this Falcon was the same car that John Fitzpatrick had crashed in practice which saw it a non-starter in 1982. In the race, Morris diced early with the RX-7 of Allan Moffat, but brake problems due to the brake fluid boiling saw Morris and French finish in eighth place, nine laps down on the winning HDT Commodore of John Harvey, Peter Brock and Larry Perkins.

Morris returned to full-time touring car racing part way through the 1984 season in a Barry Jones prepared RX-7. After first winning Round 3 of the Amaroo Park based AMSCAR Series, he went on to qualify second a week later at Oran Park for Round 5 of the 1984 ATCC. With his RX-7 fitted with a road standard gearbox, Morris pulled off a surprise win in his first ATCC start since 1982. It was to be Morris' ninth and last ATCC round win.

Morris had his final start at Bathurst in the 1984 James Hardie 1000 in what was the final Group C Bathurst 1000. Morris qualified the RX-7 in ninth place after "Hardies Heroes". Partnered with car owner Barry Jones, the pair failed to finish after suffering repeated gearbox problems throughout the race, including replacing the gearbox in the early laps. The Morris/Jones Mazda only completed 97 of the races 163 laps. That year Morris retired from competitive driving, at the comparatively young age of 36, to live on his property at Kangaroo Valley.

Morris stayed semi-involved with the sport and at the 1987 James Hardie 1000 at Bathurst was the driver of the races first ever Pace car. The pace cars had been introduced to Bathurst that year to conform to the FIA's World Touring Car Championship rules, of which Bathurst was a round in 1987.

== Career results ==
Season	Series	Position	Car	Team
1973	Australian Touring Car Championship	10th	Holden LJ Torana GTR XU-1	Ron Hodgson Motors
1974	Australian Touring Car Championship	2nd	Holden LJ Torana GTR XU-1	Ron Hodgson Motors
1975	Australian Touring Car Championship	6th	Holden LH Torana SLR/5000 L34	Ron Hodgson Motors
1976	Australian Touring Car Championship	9th	Holden LH Torana SLR/5000 L34; Triumph Dolomite Sprint	Ron Hodgson Motors
1976	Rothmans Sun-7 Series	3rd	Triumph Dolomite Sprint	Ron Hodgson
1977	Australian Touring Car Championship	5th	Holden LH Torana SLR/5000 L34; Triumph Dolomite Sprint; Ford Capri Mk.II	Ron Hodgson Channel 7 Racing
1978	Australian Touring Car Championship	2nd	Holden LX Torana SS A9X Hatchback	Ron Hodgson Channel 7 Racing
1979	Australian Touring Car Championship	1st	Holden LX Torana SS A9X Hatchback	Ron Hodgson Channel 7 Racing
1979	Rothmans AMSCAR Series	1st	Holden LX Torana SS A9X Hatchback	Ron Hodgson Channel 7 Racing
1980	Australian Touring Car Championship	5th	Holden VB Commodore	Craven Mild Racing
1981	Better Brakes 3.5 Litre Series	13th	Holden Gemini ZZ	Bob Morris
1984	Australian Touring Car Championship	13th	Mazda RX-7	Bob Jones Racing

=== Complete Australian Touring Car Championship results ===
(key) (Races in bold indicate pole position) (Races in italics indicate fastest lap)

Year	Team	Car	1	2	3	4	5	6	7	8	9	10	11	DC	Points
1973	Ron Hodgson Motors	Holden LJ Torana GTR XU-1	SYM	CAL	SAN	WAN	SUR	AIR	ORA; 4	WAR; 2				10th	13
1974	Ron Hodgson Motors	Holden LJ Torana GTR XU-1	SYM	CAL; 2	SAN; 4	AMA; 2	ORA; 3	SUR; 2	AIR; 2					2nd	46
1975	Ron Hodgson Motors	Holden LH Torana SL/R 5000 L34	SYM; 3	CAL; Ret	AMA; 1	ORA; Ret	SUR; 1	SAN	AIR; 4	LAK				6th	32
1976	Ron Hodgson Motors	Holden LH Torana SL/R 5000 L34 Triumph Dolomite Sprint	SYM; 3	CAL	ORA	SAN; Ret	AMA	AIR	LAK	SAN; Ret	AIR; 7	SUR; 6	PHI; Ret	9th	30
1977	Ron Hodgson Channel 7 Racing	Holden LH Torana SL/R 5000 L34 Triumph Dolomite Sprint Ford Capri Mk.II	SYM; 6	CAL; Ret	ORA; 9	AMA; 10	SAN; Ret	AIR	LAK; 9	SAN; Ret	AIR	SUR; 2	PHI	5th	44
1978	Ron Hodgson Channel 7 Racing	Holden LX Torana SS A9X	SYM; 2	ORA; 2	AMA; 13	SAN; 2	WAN; 4	CAL; 1	LAK; 2	AIR; Ret				2nd	53
1979	Ron Hodgson Channel 7 Racing	Holden LX Torana SS A9X	SYM; 4	CAL; 2	ORA; 1	SAN; 1	WAN; 4	SUR; 4	LAK; 1	AIR; 1				1st	69
1980	Craven Mild Racing	Holden VB Commodore	SYM; 8	CAL; Ret	LAK; Ret	SAN; Ret	WAN; 3	SUR; Ret	AIR; 6	ORA; 1				5th	25
1984	Barry Jones	Mazda RX-7	SAN	SYM	WAN	SUR	ORA; 1	LAK	AIR					13th	25

=== Complete Bathurst 1000 results ===
Year	Team	Co-drivers	Car	Class	Laps	Pos.	Class pos.
1968	(Australia) AMI Racing Team	(Australia) Bruce Hindhaugh	Toyota Corolla	A	113	30th	1st
1969	(Australia) AMI Toyota	(Australia) Brian Sampson	Toyota Corolla	A	112	29th	1st
1970	(Australia) Holden Dealer Team	(Australia) Peter Brock	Holden LC Torana GTR XU-1	C	107	37th	14th
1971	(Australia) Mark IV Car Air Conditioning	(Australia) Ray Morris	Ford XY Falcon GT-HO Phase III	E	80	DNF	DNF
1973	(Australia) Ron Hodgson Racing	(Australia) John Leffler	Holden LJ Torana GTR XU-1	D	3	DNF	DNF
1974	(Australia) Ron Hodgson Racing	(Australia) John Leffler	Holden LJ Torana GTR XU-1	3001 – 6000cc	63	DNF	DNF
1975	(Australia) Ron Hodgson Racing	(Australia) Frank Gardner	Holden LH Torana SL/R 5000 L34	D	161	2nd	2nd
1976	(Australia) Ron Hodgson Motors	(United Kingdom) John Fitzpatrick	Holden LH Torana SL/R 5000 L34	3001cc - 6000cc	163	1st	1st
1977	(Australia) Ron Hodgson Motors	(United Kingdom) John Fitzpatrick	Holden LX Torana SL/R 5000 A9X 4-Door	3001cc - 6000cc	111	DNF	DNF
1978	(Australia) Ron Hodgson Channel 7 Racing	(United Kingdom) John Fitzpatrick	Holden LX Torana SS A9X Hatchback	A	73	DNF	DNF
1979	(Australia) Ron Hodgson Channel 7 Racing	(Austria) Dieter Quester	Holden LX Torana SS A9X Hatchback	A	95	DNF	DNF
1980	(Australia) Channel 7 Breville Racing	(Australia) Bill O'Brien (Canada) Allan Moffat	Ford XD Falcon	3001-6000cc	88	DNF	DNF
1981	(Australia) Bob Morris Motor Sport	(United Kingdom) John Fitzpatrick	Ford XD Falcon	8 Cylinder & Over	120	2nd	2nd
1982	(Australia) Seiko Watches	(United Kingdom) John Fitzpatrick	Ford XE Falcon	A	-	DNS	DNS
1983	(Australia) John Sands Racing	(Australia) Rusty French	Holden VH Commodore SS	A	154	8th	8th
1984	(Australia) Chequered Flag Magazine	(Australia) Barry Jones	Mazda RX-7	Group C	97	DNF	DNF

Sporting positions
Preceded by Peter Brock; Brian Sampson	Winner of the Bathurst 1000; 1976 (with John Fitzpatrick)	Succeeded by Allan Moffat; Jacky Ickx
Preceded by Peter Brock	Winner of the Australian Touring Car Championship; 1979	Succeeded by Peter Brock
