= 1976 Hardie-Ferodo 1000 =

Motor race in Australia

Seasons
- ← 1975 1977 →

Layout of the Mount Panorama Circuit (1938-1986)

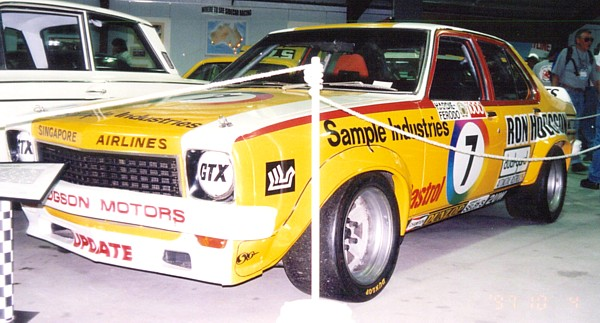
The race winning Morris/Fitzpatrick Holden LH Torana SL/R 5000 L34

The 1976 Hardie-Ferodo 1000 was the 17th running of the Bathurst 1000 touring car race. It was held on 3 October 1976 at the Mount Panorama Circuit just outside Bathurst in New South Wales, Australia. The race was open to cars complying with CAMS Group C Touring Car regulations.

The race was dramatically won by the Ron Hodgson Motors entered Holden LH Torana SL/R 5000 L34 of Bob Morris and British driver John Fitzpatrick. Second on the same lap was the Holden Dealer Team Torana L34 of Colin Bond and John Harvey. Brothers Peter and Phil Brock in the Team Brock entered Torana L34 completed a second consecutive podium clean sweep for the Torana L34. In fact, Torana L34s filled the top seven places.

The competitors in the over three-litre class included ex-Formula 1 drivers Jack Brabham and Stirling Moss, in a Torana L34 entered by Esmonds Motors of Queanbeyan. Brabham was driving competitively for the first time since 1971, and Moss had not competed in a circuit race since his Goodwood crash in 1962. The two former Grand Prix stars attracted much publicity and ultimately qualified tenth. However, their race effectively ended when Brabham lined up to take the start; the Torana's gears became jammed on the grid and a Triumph Dolomite Sprint rammed it hard from behind (in his attempt to find a gear, Jack had failed to put his arm out the window to warn other drivers). Although the Torana was hastily repaired, and reappeared several hours later simply for appearances, it eventually blew its motor with Moss at the wheel. Unfortunately Moss attracted criticism from other drivers after the Torana's engine blew as he continued to drive the car on the racing line for ¾ of a lap, with smoke billowing from the exhaust and dropping oil on the track.

The 2001 to 3000cc class saw Ford Capri drivers Barry Seton and Don Smith take a one lap victory over the Mazda RX-3 of Don Holland and Lynn Brown. Another Capri, the car of Graham Moore and emerging Queensland driver Dick Johnson was a further lap down in third.

The 1301 to 2000cc class also saw one lap margins between the top three cars with the Ford Escort of Eric Boord and Tom Tymons beating the Alfa Romeo GTV of Phil McDonnell and Jim Hunter. The Bob Holden run Ford Escort of Lyndon Arnel and Peter Hopwood was third.

The John Roxburgh Motors entered Datsun 1200 of Bill Evans and Bruce Stewart took a two lap victory in the Up to 1300cc class over the Honda Civics of Brian Reed and Ian Chilman, and Roger Bonhomme and Doug Whiteford.

The 1976 race continues to be a source of controversy, as it has been claimed that a lap scoring error caused the Hold Dealer Team Torana of Bond and Harvey not to be counted for a lap, thus robbing them of the victory. However HDT, the team backed by Holden, did not appeal the results; some have claimed this is because Holden did not want to appear to be doing a disservice to the Morris/Fitzpatrick team which was run by Ron Hodgson Motors, which at the time was Sydney's largest Holden dealership. The lap counting error has been denied by the Australian Racing Drivers Club (ARDC), and by some teams (including the race winners and television broadcaster Channel 7) who carried out their own lap scoring. An appeal of the results was not lodged prior to the expiration date meaning the results as published are final. In 2003 Holden offered Harvey an apology for not appealing the results. This occurred at a testimonial dinner for Harvey who after retiring from racing had gone on to become a senior executive with Holden Special Vehicles. Since that time though, Harvey has caused controversy by publicly stating that he was the winner of the race, though the official results continue to show him finishing second. For his part, Colin Bond has remained in dignified silence.

== Class structure ==
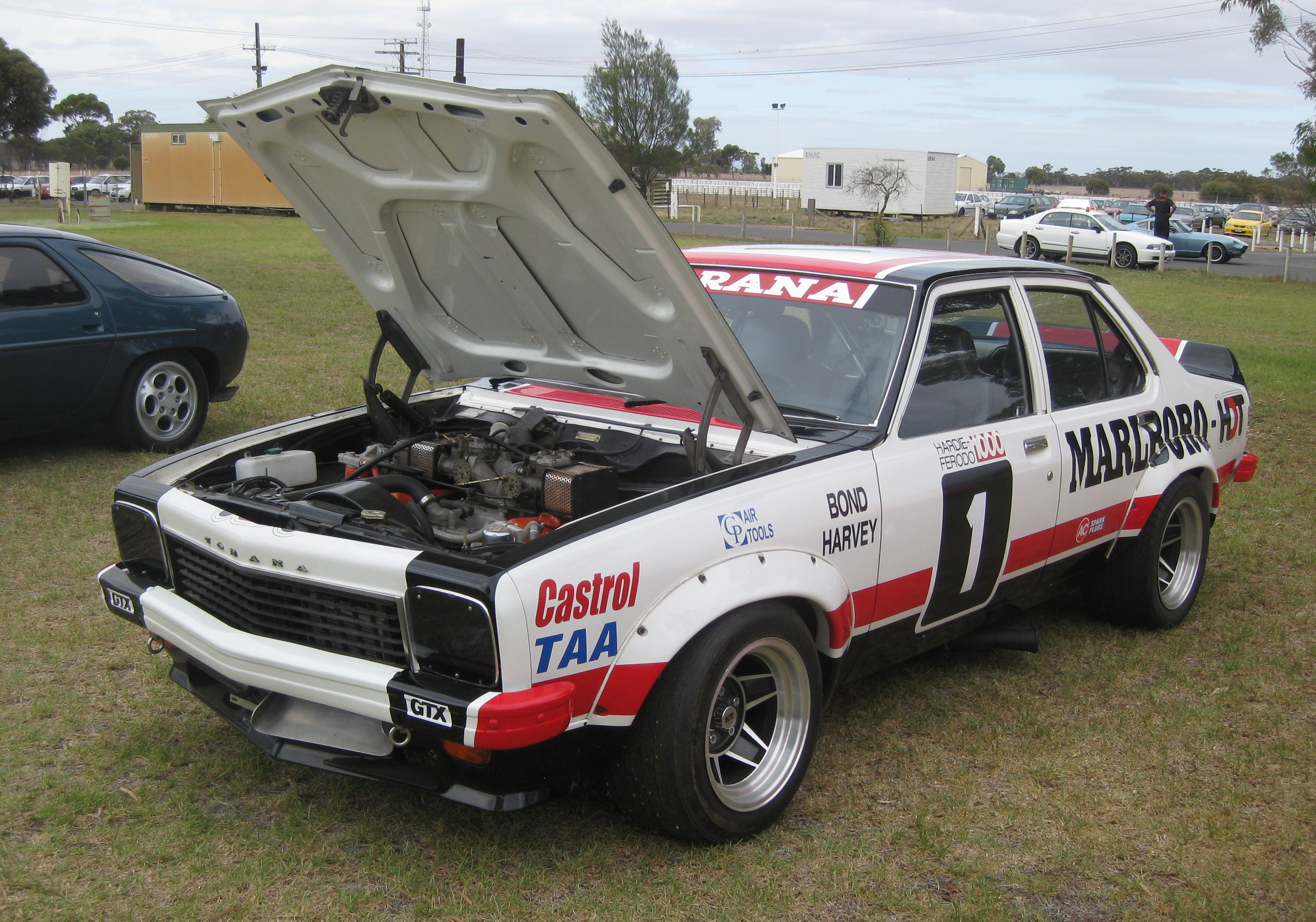
Reproduction of the Bond/Harvey HDT Holden LH Torana SL/R 5000 L34

The field was divided into four classes based on engine capacity.

=== Class: Up to 1300cc ===
The class comprised Alfa Romeo 1300, Datsun 1200, Fiat 128 3P, Ford Escort, Honda Civic, Mazda 1300, Morris Clubman GT, Toyota Corolla and Volkswagen Passat.

=== Class: 1301cc - 2000cc ===
The class saw a mix of Alfa Romeo Alfetta and 2000 GTV, BMW 2002, Fiat 124 Sport, Ford Escort RS2000, Mazda RX-3, Triumph Dolomite and Volkswagen Golf.

=== Class: 2001cc - 3000cc ===
The class featured BMW 3.0Si, Ford Capri and Mazda RX-3.

=== Class: 3001cc - 6000cc ===
The class consisted only of Holden Torana and Ford Falcon entries.

== Top 10 Qualifiers ==
Pos	No	Team	Driver	Car	Qual
Pole	9	Moffat-Ford Dealer Team	(Canada) Allan Moffat	Ford XB Falcon GT Hardtop	2:25.0
2	5	Team Brock	(Australia) Peter Brock	Holden LH Torana SL/R 5000 L34	2:25.1
3	1	Holden Dealer Team	(Australia) Colin Bond	Holden LH Torana SL/R 5000 L34	2:26.2
4	7	Ron Hodgson Motors	(Australia) Bob Morris	Holden LH Torana SL/R 5000 L34	2:26.4
5	2	John Goss Racing Pty Ltd	(Australia) John Goss	Ford XB Falcon GT Hardtop	2:27.5
6	20	Craven Mild Racing	(Australia) Allan Grice	Holden LH Torana SL/R 5000 L34	2:28.1
7	8	Holden Dealer Team	(Australia) Charlie O'Brien	Holden LH Torana SL/R 5000 L34	2:28.3
8	12	Craven Mild Racing	(Australia) Frank Gardner	Holden LH Torana SL/R 5000 L34	2:29.1
9	15	Captain Peter Janson	(Australia) Kevin Bartlett	Holden LH Torana SL/R 5000 L34	2:29.5
10	17	Esmonds Motors	(Australia) Jack Brabham	Holden LH Torana SL/R 5000 L34	2:30.0

== Results ==
Pos	Class	No	Entrant	Drivers	Car	Laps	Qual Pos
1	3001cc - 6000cc	7	Ron Hodgson Motors	(Australia) Bob Morris (United Kingdom) John Fitzpatrick	Holden LH Torana SL/R 5000 L34	163	4
2	3001cc - 6000cc	1	Marlboro Holden Dealer Team	(Australia) Colin Bond (Australia) John Harvey	Holden LH Torana SL/R 5000 L34	163	3
3	3001cc - 6000cc	5	Team Brock	(Australia) Peter Brock (Australia) Phil Brock	Holden LH Torana SL/R 5000 L34	160	2
4	3001cc - 6000cc	8	Marlboro Holden Dealer Team	(Australia) Charlie O'Brien (Australia) Wayne Negus	Holden LH Torana SL/R 5000 L34	160	7
5	3001cc - 6000cc	15	Captain Peter Janson	(New Zealand) Peter Janson (Australia) Kevin Bartlett	Holden LH Torana SL/R 5000 L34	158	9
6	3001cc - 6000cc	14	Bob Forbes	(Australia) Bob Forbes (Australia) Russ McRae	Holden LH Torana SL/R 5000 L34	157	15
7	3001cc - 6000cc	3	Max Wright Motors Pty Ltd	(Australia) Bob Skelton (Australia) Alan Hamilton	Holden LH Torana SL/R 5000 L34	157	13
8	2001cc - 3000cc	26	Barry Benson	(Australia) Barry Seton (Australia) Don Smith	Ford Capri Mk.I	156	18
9	2001cc - 3000cc	23	Penrith Mazda Centre Pty Ltd	(Australia) Don Holland (Australia) Lynn Brown	Mazda RX-3	155	28
10	2001cc - 3000cc	28	Bryan Byrt Ford	(Australia) Graham Moore (Australia) Dick Johnson	Ford Capri Mk.I RS3100	154	19
11	2001cc - 3000cc	21	Mazda House Racing Team	(Australia) Geoff Leeds (Australia) Jim McKeown	Mazda RX-3	154	25
12	1301cc - 2000cc	51	Fischer Ford Racing Team	(Australia) Eric Boord (Australia) Tom Tymons	Ford Escort RS2000 Mk.I	152	30
13	2001cc - 3000cc	30	Wyong Tyres & Spares	(Australia) Russell Skaife (Australia) Brian Potts	Ford Capri Mk.I	151	26
14	1301cc - 2000cc	39	Quick Fit Spares & Accessories	(Australia) Phil McDonnell (Australia) Jim Hunter	Alfa Romeo 2000 GTV	151	39
15	1301cc - 2000cc	45	Bob Holden - Shell Sport	(Australia) Lyndon Arnel (Australia) Peter Hopwood	Ford Escort RS2000 Mk.II	150	38
16	1301cc - 2000cc	60	Clemens Sporting Car Services Pty Ltd	(Australia) Frank Porter (Australia) Tony Roberts	Alfa Romeo Alfetta GTAm	149	34
17	1301cc - 2000cc	59	Autodelta Racing Australia	(Australia) John Leffler (Australia) Richard Carter	Alfa Romeo Alfetta GTAm	148	33
18	1301cc - 2000cc	40	Pye Racing	(Australia) Peter Wherrett (Australia) David Jones	Alfa Romeo 2000 GTV	148	35
19	3001cc - 6000cc	18	Murray Carter	(Australia) Murray Carter (Australia) Ray Winter	Ford XB Falcon GT Hardtop	148	14
20	2001cc - 3000cc	34	Craven Mild Racing	(Australia) Paul Older (Australia) Barry Lake	BMW 3.0 Si	147	31
21	1301cc - 2000cc	50	Computer Accounting Services Pty Ltd	(Australia) Terry Daly (Australia) Barry Jones	Ford Escort RS2000 Mk.I	146	42
22	2001cc - 3000cc	25	Eurocars Pty Ltd	(Australia) Brian Wheeler (Australia) Neil Mason	Mazda RX-3	143	32
23	1301cc - 2000cc	48	De Bortolis Wines Pty Ltd	(Australia) Bruce Hodgson (Australia) Dave Morrow	Ford Escort RS2000 Mk.II	142	37
24	Up to 1300cc	71	John Roxburgh Motors Pty Ltd	(Australia) Bill Evans (Australia) Bruce Stewart	Datsun 1200	139	49
25	2001cc - 3000cc	24	Bangalow Motors Pty Ltd	(Australia) John Duggan (Australia) Doug Angus	Mazda RX-3	139	29
26	Up to 1300cc	64	Ian Chilman	(Australia) Brian Reed (Australia) Ian Chilman	Honda Civic	137	55
27	3001cc - 6000cc	13	Tim Slako	(New Zealand) Tim Slako (Australia) Brian Rhodes	Holden LH Torana SL/R 5000 L34	137	17
28	Up to 1300cc	62	Mollison Motors Pty Ltd	(Australia) Roger Bonhomme (Australia) Doug Whiteford	Honda Civic	137	53
29	Up to 1300cc	75	Jeff Harris	(Australia) Jeff Harris (Australia) Arthur Hardwick	Morris Clubman GT	136	56
30	Up to 1300cc	65	James Mason Motors Pty Ltd	(Australia) Brian Porter (Australia) John Ainsley	Mazda 1300	130	61
31	3001cc - 6000cc	2	John Goss Racing Pty Ltd	(Australia) John Goss (New Zealand) Jim Richards	Ford XB Falcon GT Hardtop	129	5
32	Up to 1300cc	67	Peter Williamson Pty Ltd	(Australia) Greg Toepfer (Australia) Greville Arnel	Toyota Corolla	127	57
33	Up to 1300cc	76	Ray Molloy Motors Preston	(Australia) Ray Molloy (Australia) Alan Braszell	Morris Clubman GT	125	51
34	Up to 1300cc	73	Avant Motors - Alfa	(Australia) Robin Dudfield (Australia) Tony Niovanni	Alfa Romeo GT 1300 Junior	116	59
DNF	1301cc - 2000cc	41	Gil Gordon Alfa	(Australia) Ron Gillard (Australia) Graham Harrison	Alfa Romeo 2000 GTV	120	41
DNF	2001cc - 3000cc	31	ATP (Aust) Pty Ltd	(Australia) Alan Cant (Australia) George Morrell	Ford Capri Mk.I	111	20
DNF	Up to 1300cc	63	Auto Village - Nowra	(Australia) Ken Brian (Australia) Noel Riley	Honda Civic	104	58
DNF	1301cc - 2000cc	37	Ron Hodgson Motors	(Australia) Ron Dickson (New Zealand) Graeme Lawrence	Triumph Dolomite Sprint	103	22
DNF	1301cc - 2000cc	56	Bob Glazier	(Australia) Peter Granger (Australia) Gerry Murphy	BMW 2002 Tii	97	47
DNF	3001cc - 6000cc	6	Warren Cullen Wrecking Pty Ltd	(Australia) Warren Cullen (Australia) Max Stewart	Holden LH Torana SL/R 5000 L34	95	11
DNF	3001cc - 6000cc	9	Moffat-Ford Dealer Team	(Canada) Allan Moffat (Australia) Vern Schuppan	Ford XB Falcon GT Hardtop	87	1
DNF	1301cc - 2000cc	61	Bob Williamson's Mini Factory Tyre; Traders & Merchants Pty Ltd	(Australia) Gary Cooke (Australia) Bob Williamson	Mazda RX-3	83	62
DNF	1301cc - 2000cc	38	Endrust (Australia) Pty Ltd	(Australia) James Laing-Peach (Australia) Paul Gulson	Triumph Dolomite Sprint	82	23
DNF	3001cc - 6000cc	12	Craven Mild Racing	(Australia) Allan Grice (Australia) Frank Gardner	Holden LH Torana SL/R 5000 L34	72	8
DNF	1301cc - 2000cc	35	B & G Meyer Leyland	(Australia) John Dellaca (Australia) Kerry Wade	Triumph Dolomite Sprint	67	36
DNF	Up to 1300cc	78	Hugh Donaldson	(Australia) Hugh Donaldson (Australia) Mike Quinn	Morris Clubman GT	58	52
DNF	3001cc - 6000cc	4	Gown-Hindhaugh Engine Developments	(Australia) Garth Wigston (Australia) Bruce Hindhaugh	Holden LH Torana SL/R 5000 L34	56	12
DNF	1301cc - 2000cc	58	Brian Foley Pty Ltd	(France) Marie-Claude Charmasson (Australia) Christine Gibson	Alfa Romeo Alfetta GTAm	52	48
DNF	1301cc - 2000cc	52	Allan Nuttall	(Australia) Allan Nuttall (Australia) Richard Bailey	Fiat 124 Sport	51	46
DNF	1301cc - 2000cc	53	Lennox Motors	(Australia) Chris Heyer (Australia) Peter Lander	Volkswagen Golf	38	45
DNF	3001cc - 6000cc	17	Esmonds Motors	(Australia) Jack Brabham (United Kingdom) Stirling Moss	Holden LH Torana SL/R 5000 L34	37	10
DNF	2001cc - 3000cc	32	Head Mod Engineering	(Australia) Lawrie Nelson (Australia) Nick Louis	Ford Capri Mk.I	32	24
DNF	1301cc - 2000cc	49	Brian Wood Ford Pty Ltd	(Australia) Rod Stevens (Australia) Jim Murcott	Ford Escort RS2000 Mk.I	28	44
DNF	Up to 1300cc	72	Caroline O'Shanesy	(Australia) Caroline O'Shanesy (Australia) Garry Leggatt	Fiat 128 3P	27	60
DNF	1301cc - 2000cc	43	Bob Holden - Shell Sport	(Australia) Bob Holden (Australia) Ray Cutchie	Ford Escort RS2000 Mk.II	23	43
DNF	Up to 1300cc	69	Ken Harrison - Shell Sport	(Australia) Ken Harrison (Australia) David Turnbull	Ford Escort 1300 Mk.I	22	54
DNF	Up to 1300cc	70	Blackwood Cars Pty Ltd	(Australia) Bernie Stack (Australia) Keith Poole	Volkswagen Passat	19	50
DNF	1301cc - 2000cc	57	Ralph Radburn	(Australia) Ralph Radburn (Australia) Peter Williamson	BMW 2002 Tii	14	27
DNF	2001cc - 3000cc	27	City Ford	(Australia) Lakis Manticas (Australia) Doug Chivas	Ford Capri Mk.I	3	21
DNF	1301cc - 2000cc	36	Orange City Leyland	(Australia) David Seldon (Australia) Bob Martin	Triumph Dolomite Sprint	0	40
DNS	3001cc - 6000cc	20	Craven Mild Racing	(Australia) Frank Gardner (Australia) Allan Grice	Holden LH Torana SL/R 5000 L34		6
DNS	3001cc - 6000cc	16	Breville Holdings Pty Ltd	(Australia) Ray Kaleda (Australia) Bob Stevens	Holden LH Torana SL/R 5000 L34		16
DNQ	3001cc - 6000cc	10	Barry Sheales Holden Pty Ltd	(Australia) Kel Gough (Australia) Tom Naughton	Holden LH Torana SL/R 5000 L34		
DNQ	2001cc - 3000cc	29	Geoff Moran	(Australia) Geoff Moran (Australia) Graeme Ibbotson	Ford Capri Mk.I		
DNQ	1301cc - 2000cc	47	Peak Performance Pty Ltd	(Australia) John English (Australia) Gary Scott	Ford Escort RS2000 Mk.II		
DNQ	Up to 1300cc	68	Peter Mac's Towing Pty Ltd	(Australia) Geoff Wade (Australia) John Stoopman	Ford Escort 1300 Mk.I		
DNQ	Up to 1300cc	74	Fred's Treads Pty Ltd	(Australia) Gordon Rich (Australia) David Crowther	Alfa Romeo GT 1300 Junior		

== Statistics ==
- Pole Position - #9 Allan Moffat - 2:25.0
- Fastest Lap - #9 Allan Moffat & #5 Peter Brock - 2:28.4
- Average Speed - 141 km/h
- Race Time of winning car - 7:07:12.0
