= 1978 Australian Touring Car Championship =

Motor racing competition

Seasons
- ← 1977 1979 →

The 1978 Australian Touring Car Championship was a CAMS sanctioned Australian motor racing title open to Group C Touring Cars. The title, which was the 19th Australian Touring Car Championship, was won by Peter Brock. It was his second Australian Touring Car Championship victory.

For the second time in the history of the championship, the point score regulation which specified that not all results counted had an effect on the championship outcome. Bob Morris finishing the series on 53 points, two less than championship winner Peter Brock, after Morris lost the two points awarded for his fifth placing at Amaroo Park. However, the regulation did not actually change the championship winner as Brock would otherwise have won the title due to the tiebreaker rule with three round wins to one for Morris. Third in the championship was the consistent Rod Stevens driving his Under 3.0 litre Ford Escort RS2000. Stevens benefited from the point system that favoured the small class cars by giving bonus points for class placings.

In his first ATCC since 1973, five time series champion Ian Geoghegan won his ninth and last ATCC race when he drove his Bob Jane owned Holden Torana to a surprise win in Round 4 at Sandown. In what would be his last ATCC season, Geoghegan finished 13th in the championship.

== Calendar ==
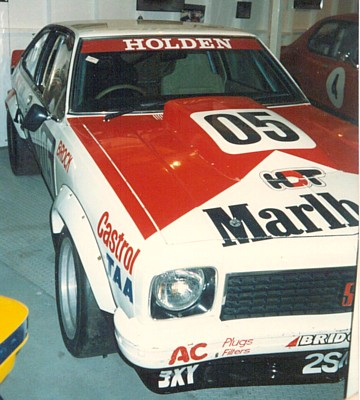
Peter Brock won the championship driving a Holden LX Torana A9X for the Marlboro Holden Dealer Team

The championship was contested over an eight round series.

Rd.	Race / circuit	Location / state	Date	Format	Round winner	Car	Entrant
1	Symmons Plains; Symmons Plains	Launceston, Tasmania	5 March	One race	Peter Brock	Holden LX Torana A9X	Marlboro Holden Dealer Team
2	Oran Park; Oran Park	Sydney, New South Wales	26 March	One race	Peter Brock	Holden LX Torana A9X	Marlboro Holden Dealer Team
3	Amaroo Park; Amaroo Park	Sydney, New South Wales	9 April	One race	Allan Grice	Holden LX Torana A9X	Craven Mild Racing
4	Sandown; Sandown	Melbourne, Victoria	16 April	One race	Ian Geoghegan	Holden LX Torana A9X	Bob Jane T-Marts
5	Wanneroo; Wanneroo Park	Perth, Western Australia	7 May	Two heats	Peter Brock	Holden LX Torana A9X	Marlboro Holden Dealer Team
6	Calder; Calder Park Raceway	Melbourne, Victoria	28 May	One race	Bob Morris	Holden LX Torana A9X	Ron Hodgson Channel 7 Racing Team
7	Round 7 Presented by Rothmans; Lakeside	Brisbane, Queensland	25 June	One race	Allan Moffat	Ford XC Falcon	Moffat Ford Dealers
8	Adelaide International Raceway; Adelaide International Raceway	Virginia, South Australia	8 August	One race	Colin Bond	Ford XC Falcon	Moffat Ford Dealers

== Classes ==
Car competed in two engine displacement classes:

- Up to and including 3000 cc
- 3001 to 6000 cc

== Points system ==
Championship points were awarded on a 9–6–4–3–2–1 basis to the first six placegetters in each of the two classes. Bonus points were awarded on a 4–3–2–1 basis to the first four placegetters irrespective of class. Only the best six scores counted towards the championship totals.

Where a round was contested in two parts, points were allocated on a 20–16–13–11–10–9–8–7–6–5–4–3–2–1 basis to the first 14 place-getters in each part and then aggregated. If more than one driver attained the same total, the superior round placing was awarded to the driver who was higher placed in the last part. Championship points were then awarded for the round.

== Championship standings ==
Pos.	Driver	No.	Car	Entrant	Sym	Ora	Ama	San	Wan	Cal	Lak	Ade	Total
1	Peter Brock	05	Holden LX Torana A9X	Marlboro Holden Dealer Team	13	13	6	DSQ	13		4	6	55
2	Bob Morris	7	Holden LX Torana A9X	Ron Hodgson Channel 7 Racing Team	9	9	(2)	9	4	13	9	Ret	53 (55)
3	Rod Stevens	69	Ford Escort RS2000 *	Brian Wood Ford		4	3	Ret	9	Ret	9	9	34
4	Allan Moffat	1	Ford XC Falcon	Moffat Ford Dealers	Ret	Ret	9	DSQ			13	9	31
5	Colin Bond	2	Ford XC Falcon	Moffat Ford Dealers	4	4	4	DSQ			Ret	13	25
5	Sue Ransom	101	Ford Capri V6 *	ABE Copiers Pty Ltd		6	4	4	6	4	1		25
7	Allan Grice	26	Holden LX Torana A9X	Craven Mild Racing	2	0	13	6	Ret	Ret		1	22
8	John Harvey	76	Holden LX Torana A9X	Marlboro Holden Dealer Team	6	0	DNS	4	9		Ret		19
9	Barry Seton	33	Ford Capri V6 *	Amco		9	9						18
10	Dick Johnson	17	Ford XC Falcon	Bryan Byrt Ford		6	Ret			9	DSQ		15
10	Ray Cutchie	53	Ford Capri V6 *	Ray Cutchie				6		9			15
10	Ray Farrar	46	Ford Capri V6 *	R. Farrar / Brain Wood Ford	9			3		3		Ret	15
13	Ian Geoghegan	3	Holden LX Torana A9X	Bob Jane Racing; Bob Jane T-Marts	Ret			13		1			14
14	Colin Campbell	50	Ford Capri V6 *	Ranger Truck Rentals Pty Ltd						6		6	12
15	Lawrie Nelson	38	Ford Capri V6 *	Lawrie Nelson				9					9
15	Peter Hopwood	37	Ford Capri IIS *			3	6						9
17	Garry Rogers	34	Holden LX Torana A9X	Greater Pacific Finance	1		1			6			8
18	Brian Potts	48	Mazda RX-3 *			1					6		7
19	Wayne Negus	4	Holden LX Torana A9X						6				6
19	Charlie O'Brien	15	Holden LX Torana A9X	O'Brien's Transport	0					Ret	6		6
21	Murray Carter	18	Ford XC Falcon	Brian Wood Ford	Ret			0		4			4
21	Warren Cullen	23	Holden LX Torana A9X	Pioneer Electronics	Ret			0				4	4
21	Jack Brabham	8	Holden LX Torana A9X			2		2					4
21	Graham Mein	102	Ford Escort RS2000 *								4		4
21	Vic Wilson	91	Ford Capri V6 *	Vic Wilson								4	4
26	Ross Burbidge	72	Mazda RX-3 *								3		3
26	David Cannon	77	Ford Escort RS2000 *	Wavell Dawson Car Sales								3	3
26	Ian Lees	42	Ford Capri V6 *	Ian Lees				1		2			3
26	Noel Edwards	44	Mazda RX-3 *	Noel Edwards						1		2	3
30	Colin Hall	21	Holden LH Torana SL/R 5000 L34						2				2
30	Peter Janson	9	Holden LX Torana A9X	Re-Car						2			2
30	Graham Ryan	19	Holden LX Torana A9X								2		2
30	Jim Richards	27	Holden LX Torana A9X	Marlboro Holden Dealer Team								2	2
30	John Goss	31	Ford XC Falcon	John Goss Pty Ltd		1		1					2
30	John Faulkner	49	Ford Capri V6 *	Wynn's Friction Proofing		2							2
30	Terry Shiel	41	Mazda RX-3 *					2					2
30	Evan Thomas	93	Mazda RX-3 *								2		2
38	Barry Kallawk	86	Holden LX Torana A9X			0			1				1
38	Peter Kuebler	64	Alfa Romeo *	Safcol-Snappy Tom								1	1
Pos.	Driver	No.	Car	Entrant	Sym	Ora	Ama	San	Wan	Cal	Lak	Ade	Total

Colour	Result
Gold	Winner
Silver	Second place
Bronze	Third place
Green	Points classification
Blue	Non-points classification
Blue	Non-classified finish (NC)
Purple	Retired, not classified (Ret)
Red	Did not qualify (DNQ)
Red	Did not pre-qualify (DNPQ)
Black	Disqualified (DSQ)
White	Did not start (DNS)
White	Withdrew (WD)
White	Race cancelled (C)
Blank	Did not practice (DNP)
Blank	Did not arrive (DNA)
Blank	Excluded (EX)

Note: Cars marked with an asterisk competed in the "Up to and including 3000 cc" class.
