= Triumph Dolomite =

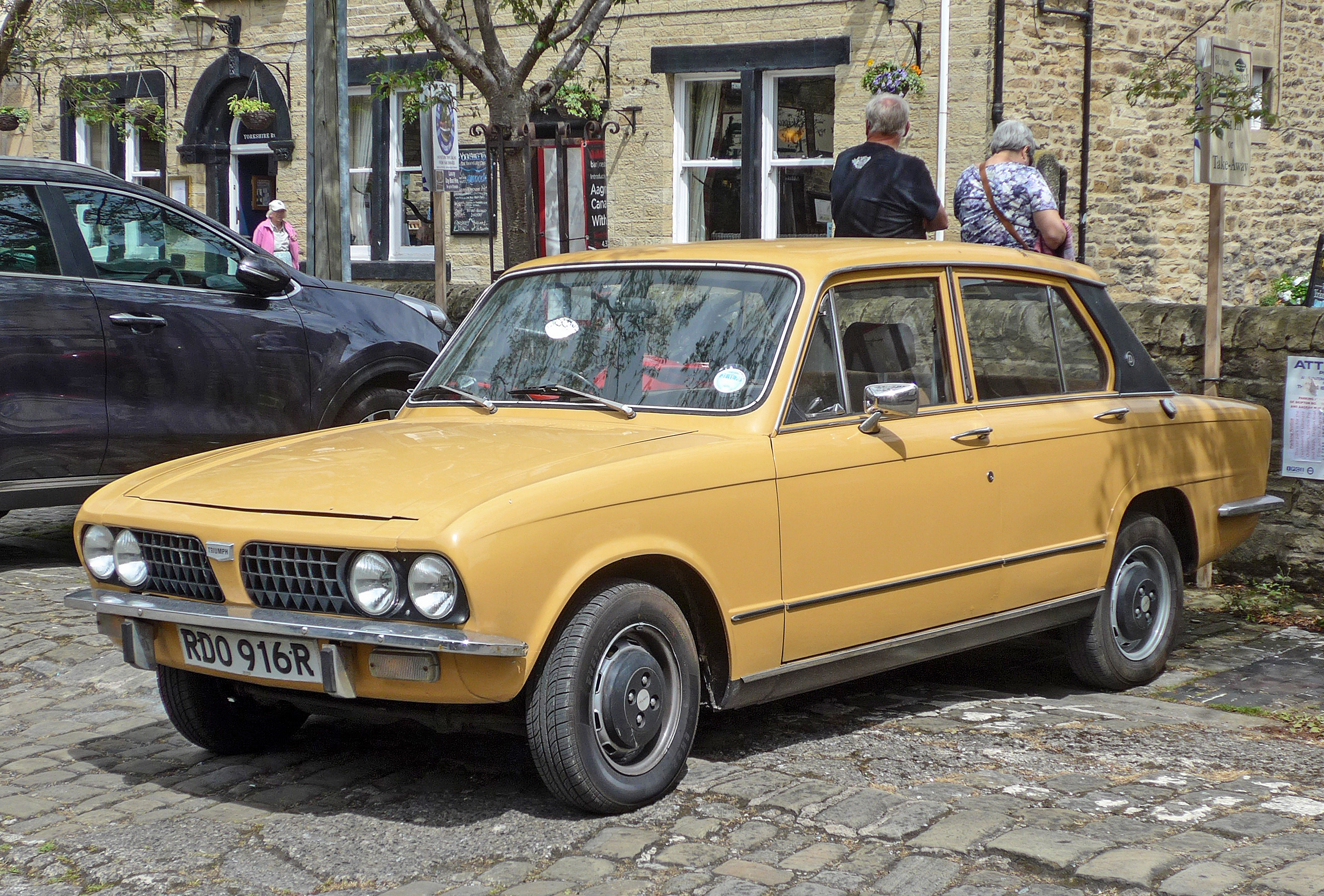

Overview
- Manufacturer: Triumph (British Leyland)
- Production: October 1972 – August 1980; 204,003 made (all versions)
- Assembly: United Kingdom: Canley, Coventry
- Designer: Giovanni Michelotti

Body and chassis
- Class: Sports saloon
- Body style: 4-door saloon
- Layout: FR layout
- Platform: "Project Ajax"

Dimensions
- Wheelbase: 96 in (2,438 mm)
- Length: 162 in (4,115 mm)
- Width: 62 in (1,575 mm)
- Height: 54 in (1,372 mm)

Chronology
- Predecessor: Triumph 1300; Triumph Toledo; Triumph 1500
- Successor: Triumph Acclaim

The Triumph Dolomite is a small saloon car which was produced by the Triumph Motor Company division of the British Leyland (BL) in Canley, Coventry, between October 1972 and August 1980.

== Background ==
The Dolomite was the final addition to Triumph's small-car range (codenamed "Project Ajax"), which had started in 1965 with the Triumph 1300. Designed to be a replacement for the rear-wheel drive Triumph Herald, the 1300 was originally fitted with a 1,296 cc (79 cu in) engine and front-wheel drive. The later model, introduced in September 1970 as the Triumph 1500, featured a remodelled front and rear, styled by Michelotti, and a larger 1,493 cc (91 cu in) engine.

Triumph were however dissatisfied with the market performance of the 1300; although it had been moderately successful, the higher price and greater complexity meant sales never reached the levels of the simpler and cheaper Herald which preceded it. In an attempt to improve matters, the car was comprehensively reengineered. Launched in September 1970, the Triumph Toledo was a cheaper and more basic variant of the 1300, but with conventional rear-wheel drive. This new model was assembled alongside the now larger-engined front-wheel drive version (the Triumph 1500) which was launched at the same time as the Toledo.

== Design and reception ==
Triumph Dolomite / Dolomite 1850HL
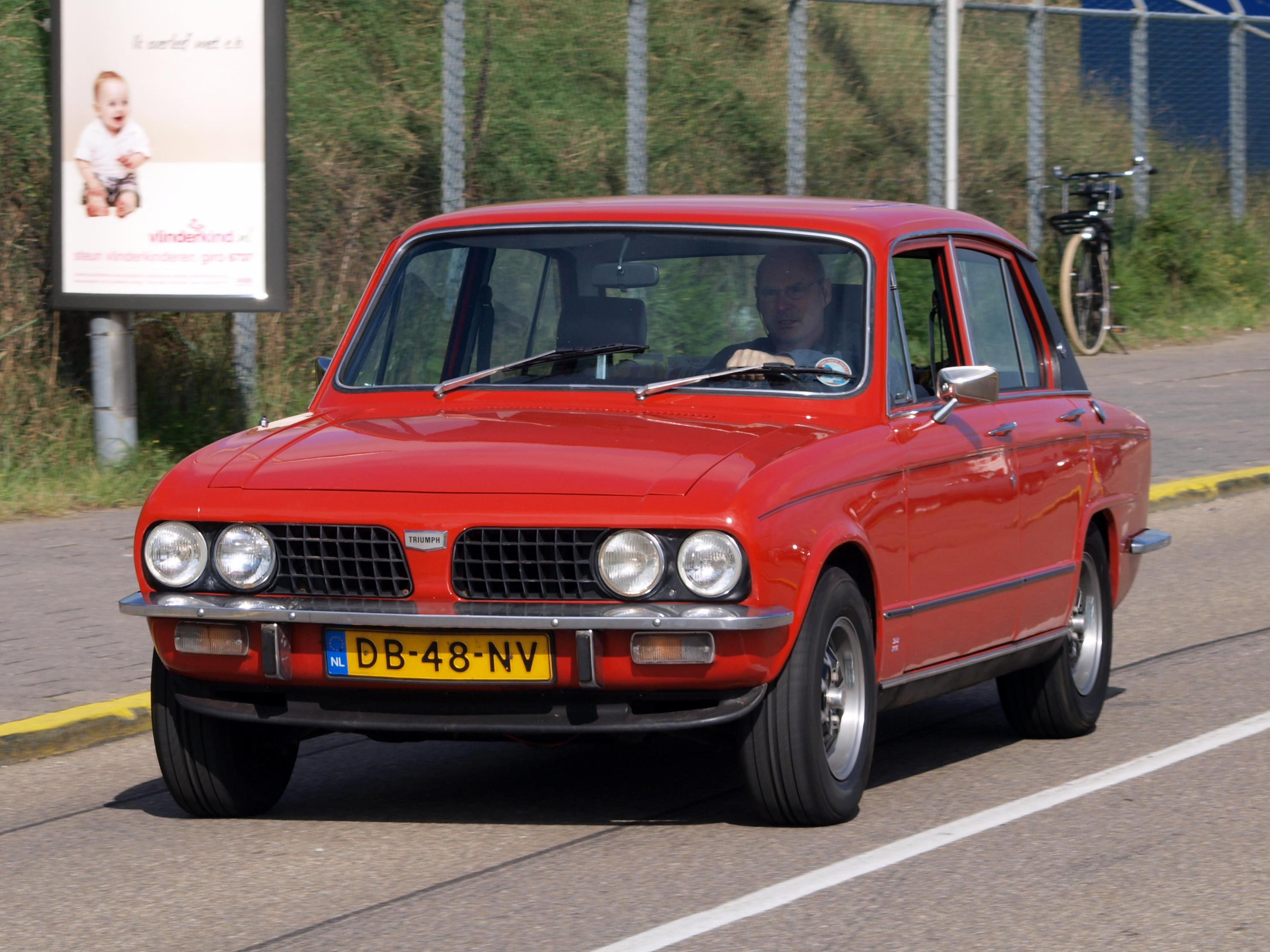

Overview
- Production: 1972–1980; 79,010 made

Powertrain
- Engine: 1854 cc Slant-Four OHC I4
- Transmission: 4 speed manual

The Triumph Dolomite was unveiled at the London Motor Show in October 1971 as the successor for the upmarket variants of front-wheel drive designs, and to replace the six-cylinder Triumph Vitesse, a sporting relative of the Herald. Due to a number of strikes and other industrial upsets, the car was not reported to be in full production until October 1972. The name "Dolomite" had been used by Triumph for a range of models prior to the Second World War and this was revived for the new car. The Dolomite used the longer bodyshell of the front wheel drive Triumph 1500, but with the majority of the running gear carried over from the rear-wheel drive Triumph Toledo.

Initially, the only version available used the new slant-four 1,854 cc engine, which mated an alloy overhead cam (OHC) head to an iron block, providing 91 bhp (68 kW) which offered sprightly performance. This was a version of the engine that the company was already providing to Saab for use in their 99 model.

The car was aimed at the new compact performance-luxury sector, vying for sales against cars such as the BMW 2002 and Ford Cortina GXL, and was offered with a high level of standard equipment, including twin headlamps, a clock, full instrumentation, luxury seats and carpets, a heated rear window, and a cigar lighter. Styling was similar to the Triumph 1500, with some updates such as a black painted rear panel, vinyl D-posts, and new wheel trims. The car was capable of 100 mph (160 km/h), with 60 mph (97 km/h) coming up in just over 11 seconds. An overdrive gearbox was soon made available as an option and there was also an optional automatic transmission.

== Dolomite Sprint ==
Triumph Dolomite Sprint
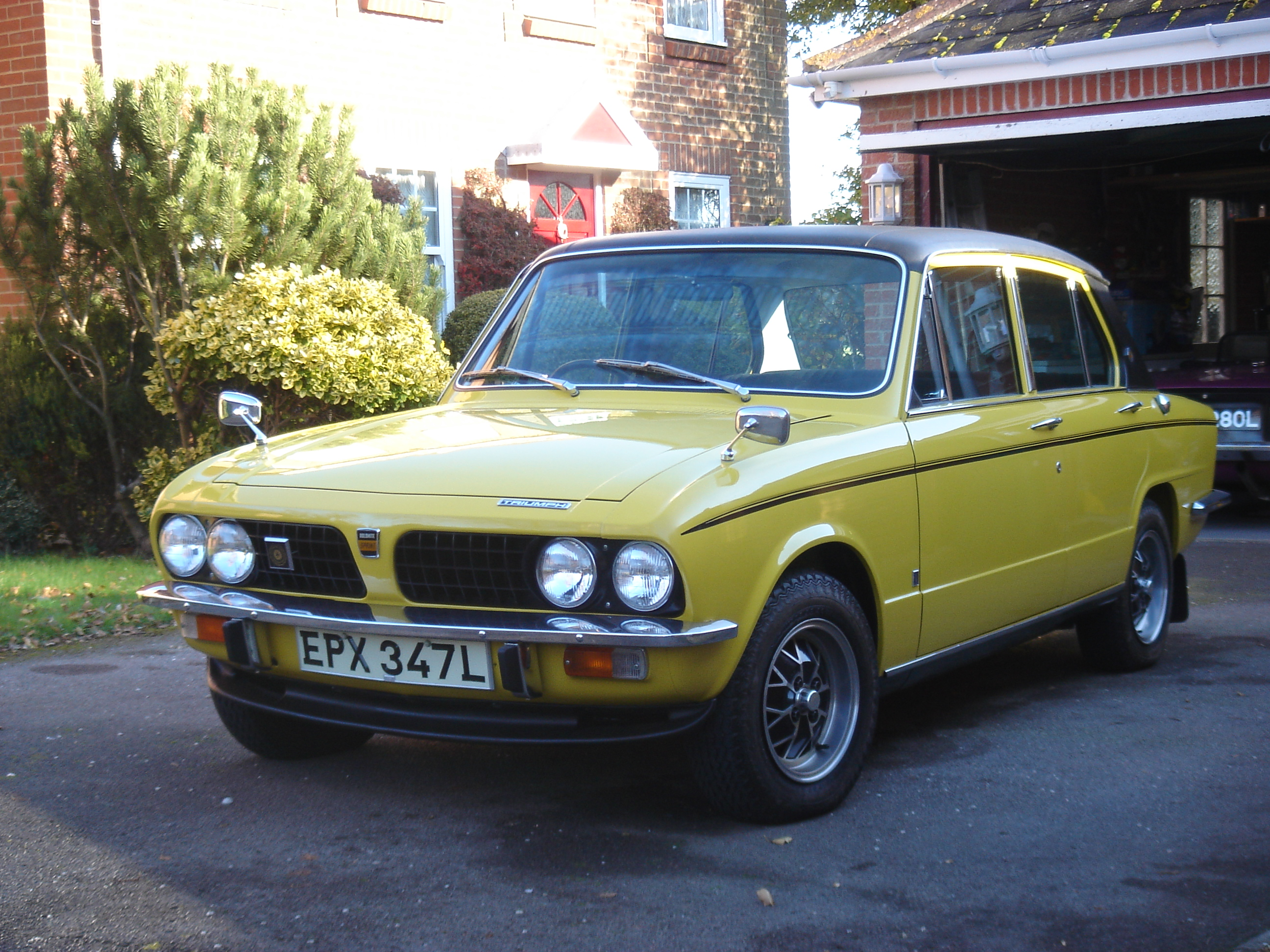
- 1973 Triumph Dolomite Sprint.

Overview
- Production: 1973–1980; 22,941 made

Powertrain
- Engine: 1998 cc SOHC 16V I4
- Transmission: 4-speed manual with (initially optional) overdrive; 3-speed automatic

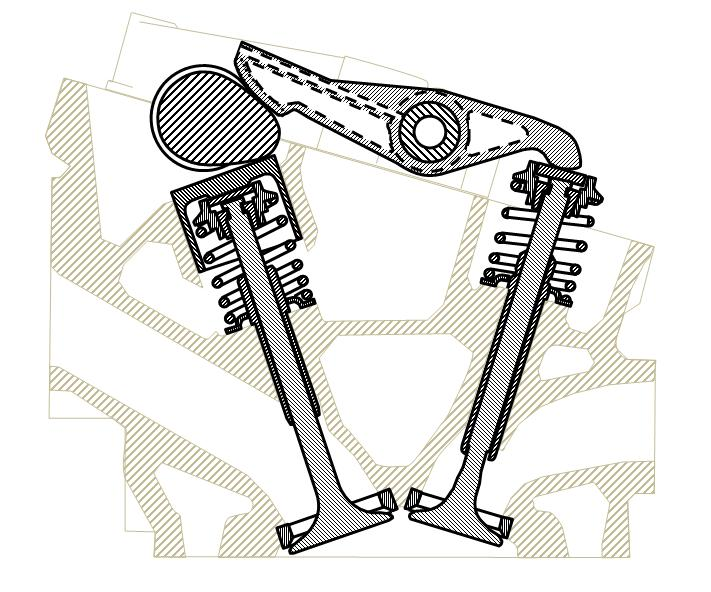
Section of a Triumph Dolomite Sprint cylinder head, highlighting the single cam operating both inlet (directly) and exhaust (through a rocker arm) valves.

Although the Dolomite proved to be refined and rapid, competitors such as the BMW 2002 had a performance advantage which was costing Triumph both sales and prestige. To remedy this, Triumph unveiled the Dolomite Sprint in June 1973, although the launch had been delayed by a year; it had been due to go on sale in 1972.

"A higher-powered development of the slant-four would provide the perfect engine to compete more effectively in motor sport. In response to this brief, Spen King’s team devised a plan to extract more power. With co-operation from Harry Mundy and the Engineers at Coventry Climax, a 16-valve cylinder head was designed", with all of the valves being actuated using a single camshaft rather than the more conventional DOHC arrangement. The capacity was also increased to 1,998 cc (122 cu in), and combined with bigger carburettors the output was upped to 122 lb⋅ft (165 N⋅m) at 4,500 rpm and 127 bhp (95 kW) at 5,700 rpm. This represented a significant power increase over the smaller 1850 cc variant.

The engine was expected to make 135 bhp, and factory test engines were producing 150 bhp. Hence, it was initially intended to be named the 'Dolomite 135'. This was changed to 'Dolomite Sprint' and published reasons vary. One oft-repeated rumour is that production lines could not guarantee 135 bhp. However, according to Matthew Vale, it was during development that Triumph switched to measuring power from imperial(SAE) to metric(DIN), which calculated outputs approximately 5 per cent lower. In this case 135 bhp SAE is 127 bhp DIN.

As a result of the use of this engine, the Dolomite Sprint has been claimed to be "the world's first mass-produced multi-valve car". While other multi-valve engines (notably the Lotus 907) were produced in volume, they were not used in mass production vehicles until after the introduction of the Dolomite Sprint. The design of the cylinder head won a British Design Council award in 1974. 0–60 mph acceleration took around 8.4 seconds, with a maximum speed of 119 mph (192 km/h). Trim was similar to the 1850, with the addition of standard alloy wheels (another first for a British production car), a vinyl roof, front spoiler, twin exhausts and lowered suspension. The seats were now cloth on the 1850, and these were also fitted to the Sprint.

Due to the increase in power brought by the new engine, the rest of the driveline was upgraded to be able to withstand the extra torque. The gearbox and differential were replaced by a version of those fitted to the TR and 2000 series cars, albeit with a close ratio gearset in the gearbox. The brakes were upgraded with new pad materials at the front, and the fitment of larger drums and a load-sensing valve at the rear. Other changes over the standard Dolomite included the option of a limited-slip differential. The optional overdrive and automatic transmissions from the 1850 model were also offered as options on the Sprint. Initial models were only offered in "mimosa yellow", although further colours were available from 1974 on.

At its launch, the Sprint was priced at £1,740, which compared extremely well to similar cars from other manufacturers. The press gave the Dolomite Sprint an enthusiastic reception. Motor summarised its road test (subtitled "Britain leads the way") with glowing praise:

...the Sprint must be the answer to many people's prayer. It is well appointed, compact, yet deceptively roomy. Performance is there in plenty, yet economy is good and the model's manners quite impeccable ... Most important of all, it is a tremendously satisfying car to drive.

A press release dated May 1973, from BL's public relations department, states "To acknowledge the Dolomite Sprint's performance the Triumph sports car colour range will be used, with the first 2,000 cars finished in Mimosa with black trim. Other distinguishing features are a black simulated leather roof covering, contrasting coachlines along the body and new badges."

From May 1975 on, overdrive on third and fourth gear (giving the Sprint a six-speed gearbox) and tinted glass were fitted as standard. In addition, all Sprints were fitted with body side trims, a plastic surround for the gearlever, and a driver's door mirror. Headrests were now available as an optional extra. From March 1976 headrests, a radio, and laminated windscreen were standard. In 1979, to comply with upcoming UK legislation, a rear fog lamp was also standard.

As with many other British Leyland cars of the period, a number of "special tuning" options were available for the Dolomite Sprint, offering dealer fitted upgrades to the car that included larger carburettors, freer flowing exhaust systems, and competition camshafts. These upgrades were designed by the factory race team and offered in order to homologate the tuning parts for competition purposes.

In 1977, a number (probably 62) of Triumph TR7s with the same Sprint engine were manufactured as pre-production cars at Speke, Liverpool. However, this Triumph TR7 Sprint variant was cancelled with the closure of the Speke assembly plant in 1978.

=== Australian Sprints ===
From August 1975 to June 1976, 620 Sprints were exported to Australia, all in Mimosa Yellow. The Triumph TR6 and Stag could be specified in Mimosa but not other Dolomites. The 16v Sprint generated a profile far higher than outright sales would suggest. In addition to stunning performance, the $7700 road going Sprints were praised for full instrumentation, a walnut interior, clock, and corded bri-nylon upholstery as seen on the Porsche 911. Like the UK, the aforementioned 'special tuning' options were also available as dealer fitted options. Australian market Sprints cost more new than the high performance Ford XB Falcon GT 351 which had an asking price of $7100. Other rivals included the Lancia Beta ($8233) and BMW 2002 ($8419). Influential Australian journalist Harold Dvoretsky (who in Europe, drove 1260 km in a Sprint) hailed the Sprint as British Leyland's best and most advanced model since the Jaguar XJ12.

Sprints were raced throughout Australia including by dealers such as Ron Hodgson. As described by Mark Oastler, Hodgson invested six figure amounts developing the Sprint into a unique competition car which was to be amongst the fastest of its type anywhere in the world. Inspired by L34 Torana program and dubbed 'Super Sprint' this was ultimately rejected by the Confederation of Australian Motorsport(CAMS). CAMS also insisted on 500 cars for homologation requirements whilst Leyland were willing to build only 300 (from the 600 already present in Australia).

At the 1976 Bathurst 1000, Jack Brabham's Torana was famously rammed and heavily damaged by a Dolomite Sprint driven by John Dellaca and Kerry Wade. In the following year, CAMS controversially refused to approve the Sprint's pistons, thereby denying the Sprint compliance to race in the 1977 Hardie-Ferodo Bathurst 1000.

By July 1976 the strict Australian Design Rule ADR27A came into effect. With emission requirements unique to Australia it was not feasible for British Leyland to reengineer the car for a small niche market. Of the 620 Dolomite Sprints imported into Australia, it is believed fewer than 80 examples (in varying condition) have survived. They are considered collectible today.

== Production numbers (Dolomite Sprint) ==
- 1973: 5,446
- 1974: 4,232
- 1975: 3,589
- 1976: 4,035
- 1977: 2,554
- 1978: 1,352
- 1979: 1,240
- 1980: 493

== Rationalisation ==
Triumph Dolomite 1300, 1500 & 1500HL
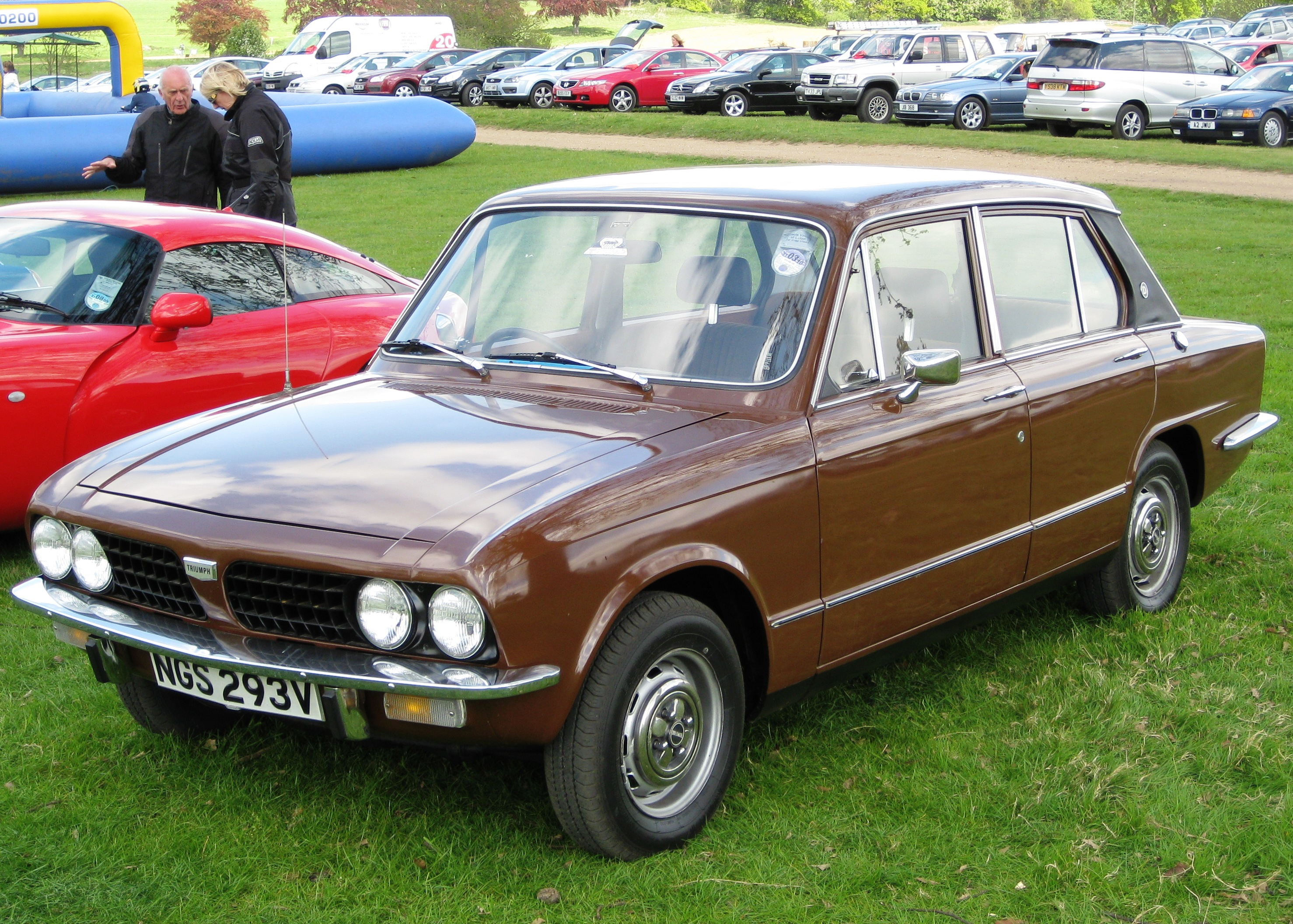
- Late model Triumph Dolomite 1500HL

Overview
- Production: 1976–1980; 32,031 made (1300 version); 70,021 made (1500-1500HL)

By the mid-1970s, the range had become complex, with a large number of models and specifications. The Dolomite bodyshell was still being made as the basic Toledo (short boot bodyshell, 1,296 cc (79 cu in) OHV, rear-wheel drive), the 1500 TC (standard bodyshell, 1,493 cc (91 cu in) OHV, rear-wheel drive) and the Dolomite/Dolomite Sprint (Standard bodyshell, 1,854 cc (113 cu in) / 1,998 cc (122 cu in), OHC, rear-wheel drive).

In 1976, with the manufacturer effectively nationalised and following recommendations in the government commissioned Ryder Report, the Dolomite and other similarly bodied ranges were rationalised as follows:

- Dolomite 1300: Base model, basic trim, single headlamps, 1,296 cc engine
- Dolomite 1500: Same as the 1300, with 1,493 cc (91 cu in) engine
- Dolomite 1500HL: Luxury specification as per the 1850, with 1,493 cc engine
- Dolomite 1850HL: Luxury specification, 1,850 cc (113 cu in) OHC engine (front spoiler fitted from 1975)
- Dolomite Sprint: The performance version: luxury trim, 16-valve 1,998 cc (122 cu in) engine

The Dolomite 1300 used the 1,296 cc (79 cu in) Standard SC engine from the Herald and Spitfire, and replaced the Toledo as the basic model in the range. The body was identical except for the lengthened body which gave the larger boot of the original Dolomites. The 1300 retained simplified fittings, including single, square, headlamps, basic instrumentation and seats, with the wooden dashboard and carpeting of the Toledo. There was no two-door option as there had been for the Toledo, and the shorter-boot bodyshell of the Toledo ceased production. Standard equipment included reclining front seats, cigar lighter, "fasten seat belt" warning light, driver's door mirror, twin reversing lights and a dipping rear-view mirror. The dashboard design was the same as that fitted to the facelifted Toledo of 1975. There was no overdrive or automatic transmission option with the 1300.

The next model up, replacing the Triumph 1500 TC, was the Dolomite 1500. The Dolomite 1500 offered identical specifications to the Dolomite 1300, apart from the seats, but with a 1,493 cc (91 cu in) engine and twin carburettors. Overdrive and automatic transmissions were offered as optional extras.

The 1500HL had essentially identical specification to the luxury 1850 (now designated 1850HL), but again featured the 1,493 cc engine. Performance was good, and once again overdrive and automatic transmissions were optional. The HL model had an improved specification level over the standard Dolomite 1500 including a rev counter, volt meter, separate fuel and temperature dials, clock, adjustable steering column and driver's-seat height adjust, head rests, front seat rear pockets, rear centre arm rest and walnut door cappings on all four doors.

The new 1500 models replaced the previous front-wheel drive layout with rear-wheel drive, with few external differences apparent in the bodywork. At a time when most manufacturers of smaller cars were concentrating on front-wheel drive cars, this change was widely considered somewhat backward thinking. However, the otherwise completely rear-wheel drive model lineup at Triumph meant that switching to rear-wheel drive would afford significant cost savings.

== Late 1970s ==
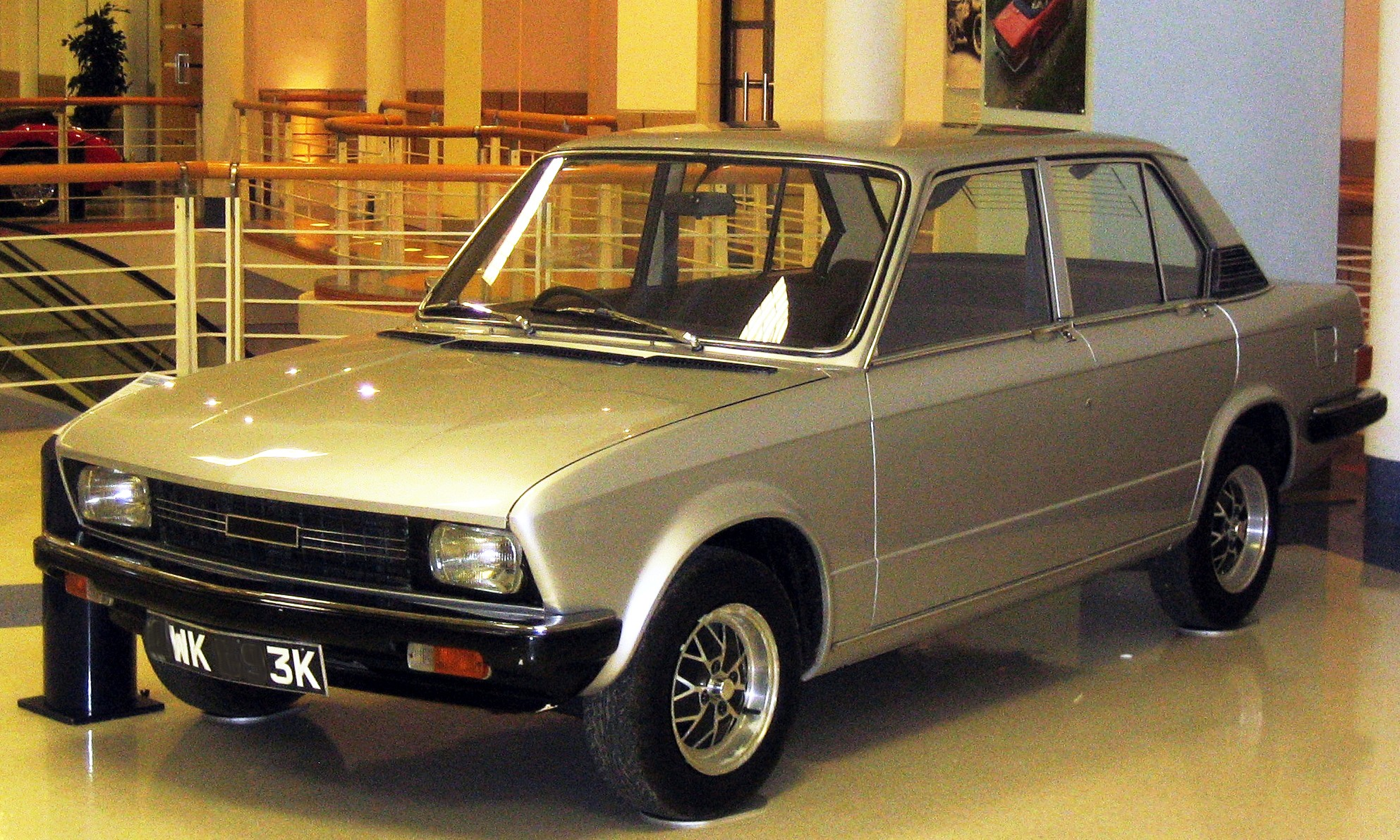
Michelotti concept

The Dolomite changed very little (in all its variants) from the beginning to the very end, only minor trim differences and additional standard equipment being the main changes. 1979 saw the introduction of the Dolomite SE, of which 2,163 were built. The bodyshell was of the basic 1500 (single headlamps) but the interior was fitted with luxury trim including burr walnut dashboard and door cappings (the dashboard was the same style as fitted to that of the Dolomite 1300), grey velour seats and matching carpet. All the cars were painted black with wide silver stripes running full length, with the letters "SE" at the end of the rear wing. The SE also sported a front spoiler and Spitfire style road wheels. By the late 1970s the Dolomite was looking increasingly old fashioned against newer competition, though still popular. Designer Giovanni Michelotti delivered a promising new design (Sprint based) resembling a Fiat 132, with a squared front and BMW style 'kink'. At least one full-size example was built. With severe problems at BLMC, management refused, there was simply not enough money. Production continued until August 1980 when BL closed the Canley Factory as part of a restructuring process which also resulted in the closure of the MG factory at Abingdon two months later.

The Dolomite was replaced a year later by the Triumph Acclaim, a four-door front-wheel drive family saloon produced in a joint venture with Honda. However, the Acclaim was not a sporty model, designed instead to compete with traditional family saloons, although it did manage strong sales on British market.

This kept the marque alive until 1984 when the Acclaim was replaced with the Rover 200 and the Triumph Motor Company passed into history.

== Reputation and popularity today ==
The Dolomite gained a reputation for fragility. The introduction of the Dolomite came at a turbulent time for BL and Triumph in particular with many new model introductions, completely new architecture and alloy head/iron block construction of the OHC slant-four, meant that dealership mechanics were not fully aware of the servicing requirements of the engine. In particular, it required the cooling system to be kept in good condition, and partially filled with a rust inhibitor, otherwise corrosion leading to radiator blockages and overheating could occur. With a well-maintained example, ownership need not be an issue today. Amongst enthusiasts, the Dolomite and especially Sprint are still popular, with many parts still available and excellent club support.

The Dolomite became a fairly rare sight on British roads with only about 1300 roadworthy examples registered in the UK with 300-400 16 valve Sprints in 2009. This is favourable when compared to other contemporaries such as the Morris Marina, of which fewer than 800 examples out of 953,576 produced were still roadworthy, despite the Marina being a stronger seller than the Dolomite. They have a popular following throughout Europe and Australia, where Sprints were imported between 1975 and 1978, and raced at Amaroo Park and at the famous Bathurst 1000. A small number of Dolomites including the Sprint variation were also imported into New Zealand during the original production run.

== Motorsport ==
=== Touring cars ===
The Dolomite Sprint was campaigned in the British Saloon Car Championship from 1974 to 1978.

The BSCC changed to an FIA Group-1 (series-production touring cars) competition from 1974 and the Dolomite Sprint was homologated into Group-1 on 2 Jan 1974. This required initial production of 5,000 cars in 12 months, which was exceeded, just, in 1973. Continued production was then needed to maintain Group-1 eligibility. For 1974, "The series production is regarded as completely stopped if the monthly rate has decreased for more than four consecutive months to below 1/12th of the minimum figure required", i.e. it required more than 417 per month for 3 evenly spaced months in 12. But from 1975 (following FIA rule changes), it only required 500 a year. Nonetheless, it may be assumed that production capacity was determined on the initial requirement for 5000 in the first 12 months and at least 1250 a year (417 a month at 4 month intervals) thereafter.

It met with some success, with Andy Rouse winning the Drivers' Championship in 1975, and also lifting the manufacturer's title in 1974 with teammate Tony Dron.

The Sprint driven by Andy Rouse and Tony Dron placed fifth overall in the Spa 24 hours race in July 1974. In September Dron placed 3rd place overall in a Sprint competing in the RAC Tourist Trophy race of that year. In 1975 Andy Rouse won the British Saloon Car Championship outright by taking the driver's title in a Sprint. In 1976 Broadspeed only ran one Dolomite Sprint in British Saloon Car Championship, with Rouse finishing second in the two-litre class. 1977 saw the departure of Rouse and the return of Tony Dron as driver of the Broadspeed prepared Dolomite Sprint. Dron won no less than seven of the twelve races outright against some stiff competition, and narrowly missed out on winning the championship outright because of tyre failure on the final race when leading his class by over a minute. In 1978 Broadspeed entered a sole Dolomite Sprint (driven by Tony Dron) where it won only one race outright, although the Sprint still won class B in the last year a factory entered Sprint would compete in the British Saloon Car Championship.

It appears that, at least from some point, the racing Dolomites Sprints used in the BSCC series were fitted with larger 2" SU HS8 carburettors, instead of the 1.75" HS6 carbs of the production cars. These are referred to as the "group one and a half cars".

The larger HS8s were also approved for FIA Group 1 from 1 Feb 1975. However, it is not clear how this approval could have been granted, given that FIA/CSI rules (Appendix J, 1975) for Group 1 denied any such modification to the carburation and thus required an additional 5000 cars to be produced in 12 months and fitted with any such modification affecting performance. Yet there is no evidence of any production of Dolomite Sprints fitted with HS8s. Neither is there any evidence of BL documentation supposed to mislead the FIA that 5000 cars fitted with HS8s and a higher lift cam, as an 'emissions kit', were exported to California. Also, this approval was removed from a later version of the FIA form of recognition for the Dolomite Sprint and was not transferred to FISA Group A approvals. There does not appear to be any current evidence of the use of HS8s on Group 1 or the "group one and a half" Dolomite Sprints outside the BSCC series. A similarly anomalous FIA approval for the Group 1 use of Weber 48DCOE carbs and suitable inlet manifold, dated 1 Jan 1977, was also removed later and not transferred to FISA Group A. The use of Weber equipped Dolomite Sprints in FIA Group 2 competitions (where choice of carburation was free) seems clear, but their use in Group 1 or "group one and a half" is not.

=== Rallying ===
Due to the heavier bodyshell and somewhat fragile Group-2 tuned engine,"rated at 225 bhp at 8000 rpm" by 1977, the Dolomite Sprint was less successful in rallying. Retirements were rather frequent resulting in failure to complete any rallies during 1974.

Things improved slightly in 1975 when a Sprint crewed by Brian Culcheth and Johnstone Syer finished 11th overall in the Welsh Rally in May 1975 (FRW 812L). This was quickly followed up with an impressive second place overall in the Tour of Britain in August 1975, and in the 1975 Lombard RAC Rally Culcheth and Syer won Group 1 and were first in class.

In January 1976 Tony Pond and D. Richards won Group 1 in the Tour of Dean Rally. In the same month, Culcheth and Syer finished fifth overall in the Snowman Rally, and seventh overall in the Mintex Rally a month later, with Tony Pond and D. Richards coming first in Group 1. Culcheth and Syer had to retire in the Granite City Rally held in March, while Pond and Richards came home fourth overall and finished first in Group 1. Culcheth and Syer finished second overall in the Tour of Britain and in the Manx Trophy Rally held in August, while P. Ryan and F. Gallagher came in ninth overall. P. Ryan and M. Nicholson also came first in Group N in the Lindisfarne Rally held in October, and they also came second in Group 1 in the Castrol '76.

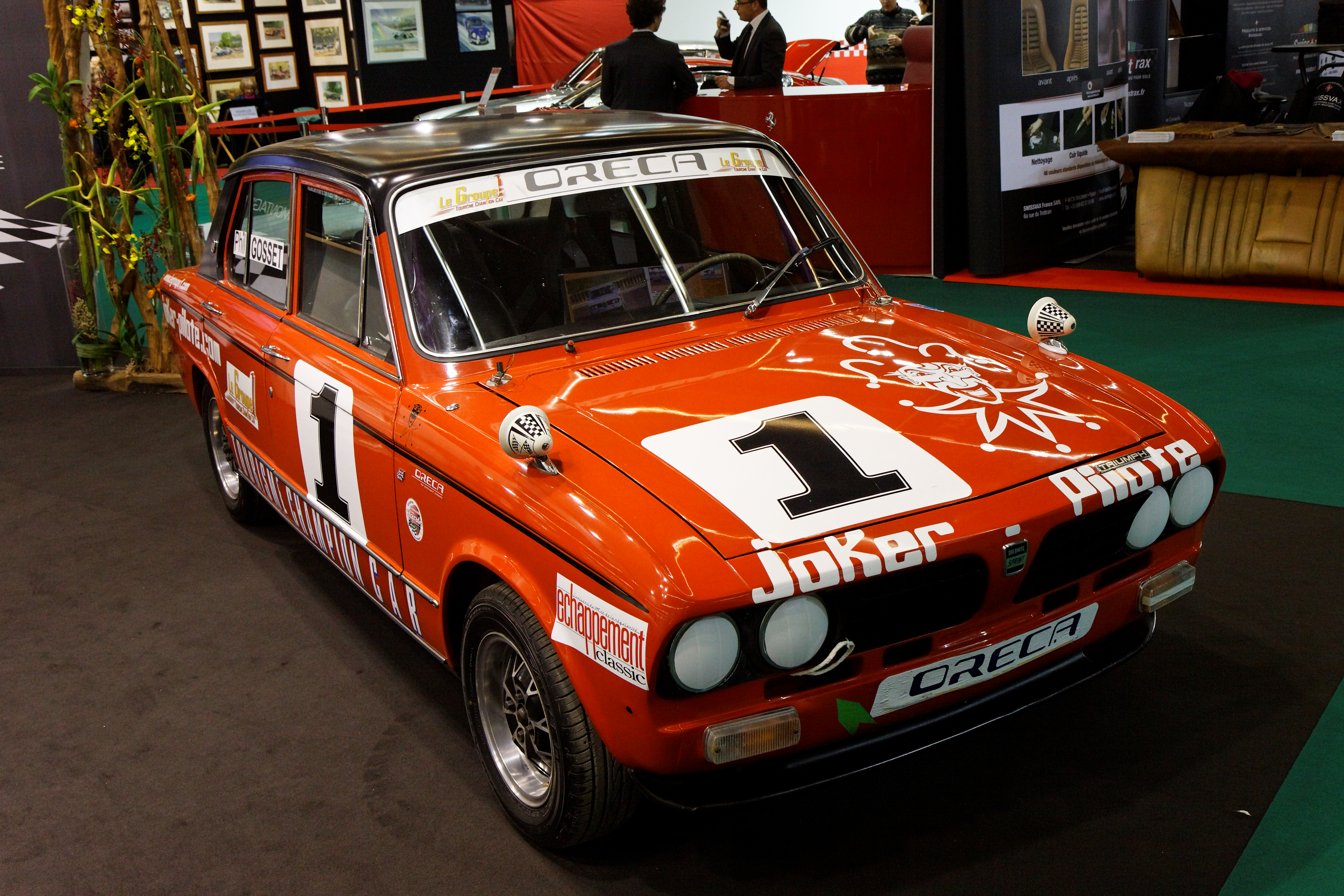
Rétromobile 2011 - Triumph Dolomite Sprint, Paris

From May 1976 onwards, the Dolomite Sprint would run alongside the TR7 before being eventually withdrawn from rallying, the TR7 V8 taking over the mantle. In the Lombard RAC Rally of 1976, the Sprint was forced to retire with engine problems. 1977 would be the last season where factory entered Sprints would compete in any form of rallying. Ryan and Nicholson managed to win Group 1 while coming eighth overall in the Granite City Rally, and this was followed by ninth overall in the Welsh Rally and finishing second in Group 1.

The Scottish Rally saw Ryan and Nicholson come 12th overall and helped win the team prize with two other TR7s. The Manx Rally held in September 1977 was the very last rally where a works-entered Sprint was entered, but it ended its rallying career on a high, managing seventh overall and first in Group 1 (both "Class 1" and "Production" classes) driven by Ryan and Nicholson.

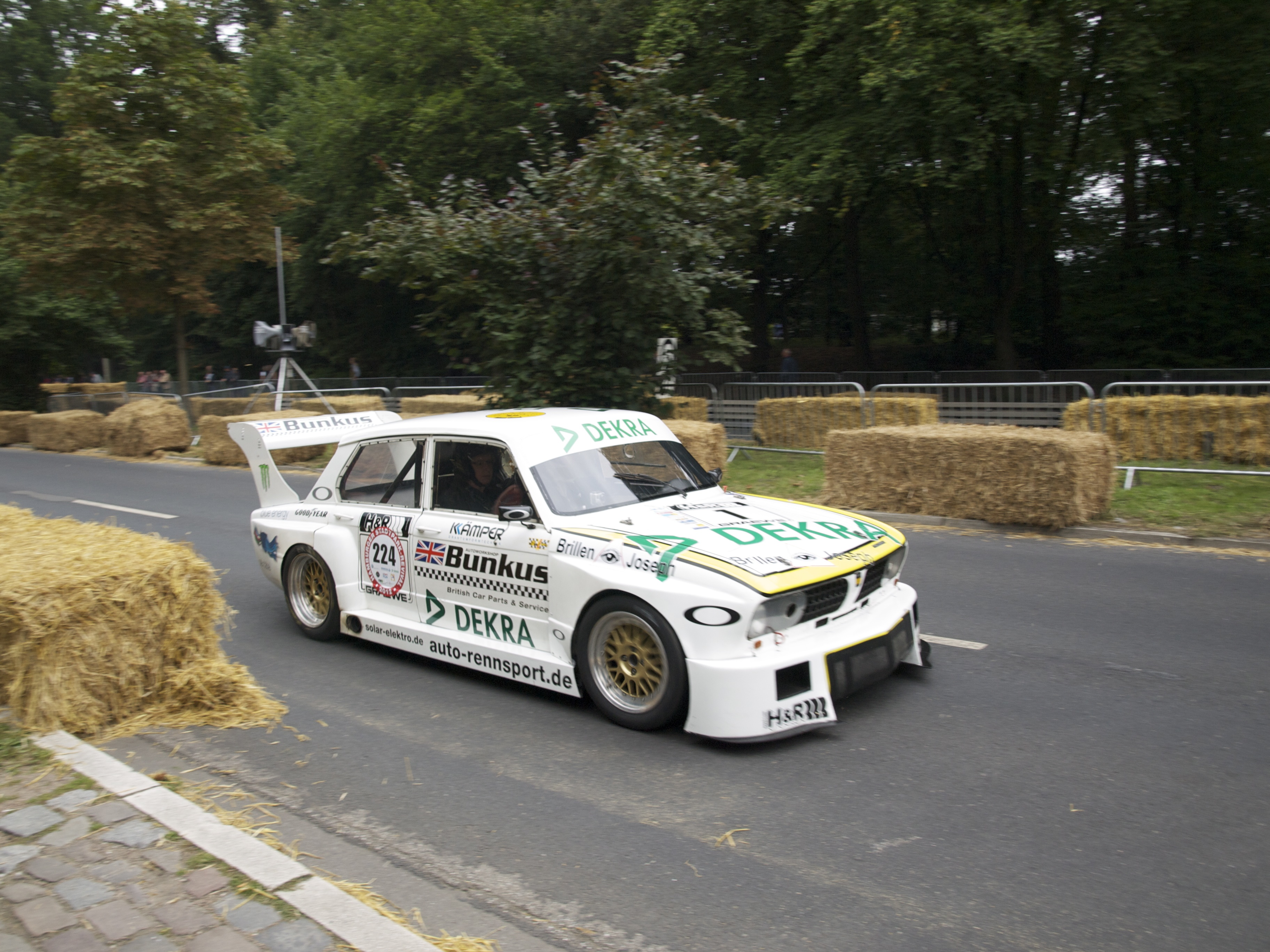
Joachim Bunkus' Triumph Dolomite Race Car

Triumph Dolomites continue to be used in many forms of classic motorsport today, with cars being campaigned on track, hillclimbs, rally stages and autocrosses in the UK, mainland Europe, and Australia, as well as the USA.

== Dolomite-derived cars ==
The early Robin Hood S7 used the front subframe and mechanical components from any Dolomite, attached to a monocoque body made out of stainless steel. Later Robin Hoods were Ford based. The Latham F2 used Dolomite mechanicals (usually Sprints), but attached to a fibreglass sports car body.

The Panther Rio was based on the Dolomite 1850 but was re-skinned with aluminium panels and had a completely revised interior. Also available was the Panther Rio Especiale, which used the Dolomite Sprint as a base. It was expensive, £9,445 for the Rio Especiale when, in February 1976, a Dolomite Sprint could be purchased for £3,283 and a V12 Jaguar XJ12 5.3 for £7,496. In total, 38 Rios were sold and were produced from 1975 to 1977.
