= 1979 Hardie-Ferodo 1000 =

Motor race in Australia

Seasons
- ← 1978 1980 →

Layout of the Mount Panorama Circuit (1938-1986)

The 1979 Hardie-Ferodo 1000 was the 20th running of the Bathurst 1000 touring car race. It was held on 30 September 1979, at the Mount Panorama Circuit just outside Bathurst. The race was open to cars eligible to the locally developed CAMS Group C touring car regulations with four engine capacity based classes.

Peter Brock and Jim Richards won their second successive Bathurst 1000 driving a Holden Dealer Team A9X SS Hatchback Torana. Brock and Richards won the race by a record six laps, beating the old winning margin of 2 laps set in 1975 with Brock setting the lap record of 2:21.1 on the last lap of the 6.172 km long circuit. It was Brock's fourth and Richards second win. Brock's win put him equal on most wins with Harry Firth, Bob Jane and his longtime rival Allan Moffat. Toranas swept the podium with Peter Janson and Larry Perkins finishing second ahead of Ralph Radburn and John Smith.

With Holden ending production of the Torana, 1979 would be the 5th and last Torana victory in the race (all bar 1976 were won by Brock). From 1980 Holden's flagship would be the European (Opel Senator) based Commodore.

The event was notable for the introduction of RaceCam – for the first time anywhere in the world, a camera broadcast live pictures to the race telecast from inside a participating car. The camera was mounted on the passenger side of Peter Williamson's Toyota Celica, with Williamson wired for sound and able to talk to the commentary team.

== Class structure ==
Cars competed in four classes defined by engine capacity.

=== 3001cc - 6000cc ===
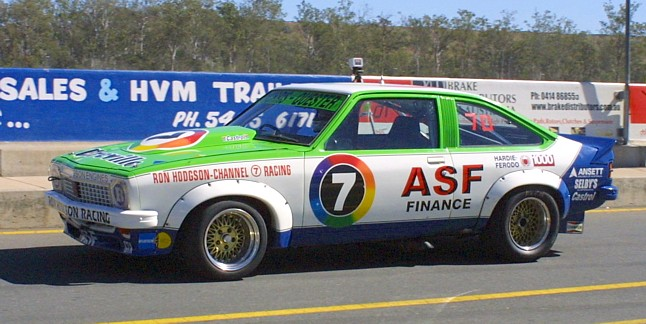
Morris/Quester Holden Torana

The 3001cc - 6000cc class featured the V8 Holden Toranas, Ford Falcons and a pair of Chevrolet Camaros, making their Bathurst debut. Class A cars would fill the first eight positions in the outright results, all of the Holden Toranas. Mirroring the outright result, Brock and Richards took a six lap victory over the similar Torana of Janson and Perkins. Smith and Radburn were two laps further behind.

=== 2001cc - 3000cc ===
The 2001cc - 3000cc class saw the debut of the Mazda RX-7 (13B powered rotaries were rated as 2.292 litres capacity) which raced alongside its predecessor, the Mazda RX-3 and against Ford Capris, a BMW 3.0Si and a largely unmodified Volvo 242GT entered as a publicity exercise by veteran journalist-racer David McKay. Mechanical issues struck this class more than most, with the class winning car finishing in 13th outright, 26 laps behind Brock and Richards. That car was the Mazda RX-3 of Barry Lee and John Gates. Second in class was the Ford Capri of Peter Hopwood and Alan Cant, nine laps behind Lee and Gates. Third in class, finishing on the same lap as Hopwood/Cant was the Mazda RX-3 of Stephen Stockdale and John Duggan. The Volvo of McKay and Spencer Martin finished a creditable fourth in class, just a lap behind second and third.

=== 1601cc - 2000cc ===
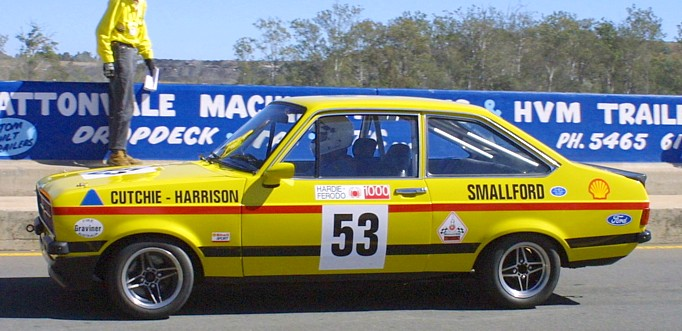
Harrison/Cutchie Ford Escort

The 1601cc - 2000cc class saw a mix Alfa Romeo Alfettas, Ford Escort RS2000s, Toyota Celicas and Triumph Dolomites. Class C outperformed Class B with the Toyota Dealer Team Toyota Celica of Peter Williamson and Mike Quinn winning the class and finishing ninth outright and 17 laps behind Brock and Richards. The Brian Foley Alfa Romeo entered Alfa Romeo Alfetta GTV of Phil McDonnell and British sportscar legend Derek Bell finished tenth outright, a lap behind the Celica. Frank Porter and Tony Niovanni were three laps further back in third in another Alfetta. The Celica of Peter Williamson became the second car in the world to have an in-car race cam, after Benny Parsons drove his car with an in-car camera at the Daytona 500 earlier the same year.

=== Up to 1600cc ===
The entry in the Up to 1600cc class was dominated by Holden Geminis, but also included an Isuzu Gemini, a 1.6 litre Ford Escort, a Toyota Corolla, and a Volkswagen Golf. The Isuzu Gemini of Garry Leggatt and David Seldon won the class, finishing 21st outright, 36 laps down. Bernie McClure and David Langman's Holden Gemini was second, a lap behind the class winners with the Holden Gemini of Jim Faneco and Gary Rowe two laps further behind. Eight laps behind was the first non-Gemini, the Ford Escort of Bob Holden and David Earle.

== Hardies Heroes ==
Pos	No	Team	Driver	Car	Time
Pole	05	Marlboro Holden Dealer Team	(Australia) Peter Brock	Holden LX Torana SS A9X Hatchback	2:20.500
2	7	Ron Hodgson Racing	(Australia) Bob Morris	Holden LX Torana SS A9X Hatchback	2:22.466
3	6	Craven Mild Racing	(Australia) Allan Grice	Holden LX Torana SS A9X Hatchback	2:23.539
4	25	Allan Moffat Racing	(Canada) Allan Moffat	Ford XC Falcon GS500 Hardtop	2:24.270
5	21	Roadways / Gown-Hindhaugh	(Australia) Charlie O'Brien	Holden LX Torana SS A9X Hatchback	2:24.579
6	34	Greater Pacific Finance Coy	(Australia) Garry Rogers	Holden LX Torana SS A9X Hatchback	2:25.918
7	19	Cadbury Schweppes	(Australia) Larry Perkins	Holden LX Torana SS A9X Hatchback	2:26.212
8	11	Citizen Watches Aust. P/L	(Australia) Gary Cooke	Holden LX Torana SLR 5000 A9X Sedan	2:27.043
9	17	Bryan Byrt Ford	(Australia) Dick Johnson	Ford XC Falcon GS500 Hardtop	2:27.655
10	4	Thompson Ford	(Australia) Colin Bond	Ford XC Falcon GS500 Hardtop	2:30.018

* Allan Moffat only qualified 22nd in his Falcon after engine troubles in qualifying. He was moved into Hardies Heroes by the ARDC at the expense of the HDT Torana SS A9X of John Harvey and ended up starting from 4th on the grid. Apart from race broadcaster Channel 7 wanting Moffat in the runoff for better television ratings, Harvey was bumped to 11th place on the grid due to the ARDC's desire to not have two cars from the same team in the top 10. As the #05 HDT Torana of Peter Brock was the fastest qualifier this saw Harvey the one left out.
* After Jack Brabham and Derek Bell in 1978, Larry Perkins became the third ex-Formula One driver to appear in the shootout driving Peter Janson's Torana. While neither Brabham or Bell would again appear in the runoff, Perkins would make another 16 appearances up until 2002 and would claim pole in 1993 (he also sat on pole in 1983 but that time was set by Peter Brock)
* Peter Brock claimed his 4th straight front row start at Bathurst (and his 5th in 6 years after starting 3rd in 1975) as well as his 3rd straight pole position. Brock's time was 1.966s faster than Bob Morris' 2nd place time in his ATCC winning A9X Torana. This was despite Brock admitting to making a big mistake at the Cutting on his second lap where his foot slipped off the brake pedal and the car went wide towards the wall forcing him to come to almost a complete stop at the bottom of the steepest part of the circuit. Despite that, Brock still equalled his qualifying time of 2:20.500.

== Results ==
Pos	Class	No	Team	Drivers	Car	Laps	Qual Pos	Shootout Pos
1	3001cc - 6000cc	05	Marlboro Holden Dealer Team	(Australia) Peter Brock (New Zealand) Jim Richards	Holden LX Torana SS A9X Hatchback	163		1
2	3001cc - 6000cc	19	Cadbury Schweppes	(New Zealand) Peter Janson (Australia) Larry Perkins	Holden LX Torana SS A9X Hatchback	157		7
3	3001cc - 6000cc	14	Ralph Radburn	(Australia) Ralph Radburn (Australia) John Smith	Holden LX Torana SL/R 5000 A9X 4-Door	155	17	
4	3001cc - 6000cc	6	Craven Mild Racing	(Australia) Allan Grice (Australia) Alfredo Costanzo	Holden LX Torana SS A9X Hatchback	154		3
5	3001cc - 6000cc	34	Greater Pacific Finance Coy	(Australia) Garry Rogers (Australia) Bob Stevens	Holden LX Torana SS A9X Hatchback	152		6
6	3001cc - 6000cc	15	Scotty Taylor Holden	(Australia) Alan Taylor (Australia) Kevin Kennedy	Holden LX Torana SS A9X Hatchback	151	15	
7	3001cc - 6000cc	8	Unipart Australia	(Australia) Barry Seton (Australia) Don Smith	Holden LX Torana SS A9X Hatchback	148	16	
8	3001cc - 6000cc	21	Roadways / Gown-Hindhaugh	(Australia) Charlie O'Brien (Australia) Garth Wigston	Holden LX Torana SS A9X Hatchback	147		5
9	1601cc - 2000cc	66	Peter Williamson P/L	(Australia) Peter Williamson (Australia) Mike Quinn	Toyota Celica	146	33	
10	1601cc - 2000cc	58	Brian Foley P/L	(Australia) Phil McDonnell (United Kingdom) Derek Bell	Alfa Romeo Alfetta GTV	145	27	
11	1601cc - 2000cc	59	Beninca Motors	(Australia) Frank Porter (Australia) Tony Niovanni	Alfa Romeo Alfetta GTV	142	39	
12	1601cc - 2000cc	64	Ray Gulson	(Australia) Ray Gulson (Australia) Paul Gulson	Alfa Romeo 2000 GTV	140	37	
13	2001cc - 3000cc	48	Barry Lee	(Australia) Barry Lee (Australia) John Gates	Mazda RX-3	139	29	
14	3001cc - 6000cc	12	Rusty French Racing	(Australia) Jim Keogh (Australia) John Mann	Ford XC Falcon GS500 Hardtop	138	22	
15	1601cc - 2000cc	65	Lockyer Wreckers	(Australia) Walter Scott (Australia) Peter Walton	Toyota Celica	133	30	
16	2001cc - 3000cc	46	Fury Ford P/L	(Australia) Terry Daly (Australia) Eric Boord	Ford Capri Mk.II	133	30	
17	3001cc - 6000cc	24	Re-Car Racing	(Australia) Alan Browne (Australia) Brian Sampson	Holden LX Torana SL/R 5000 A9X 4-Door	133	15	
18	2001cc - 3000cc	41	Jag Racing P/L	(Australia) Peter Hopwood (Australia) Alan Cant	Ford Capri Mk.II	130	32	
19	2001cc - 3000cc	39	Stephen Stockdale	(Australia) Stephen Stockdale (Australia) John Duggan	Mazda RX-3	130	31	
20	2001cc - 3000cc	44	Scuderia Veloce P/L	(Australia) Spencer Martin (Australia) David McKay	Volvo 242 GT	129	47	
21	Up to 1600cc	70	Garry Leggatt	(Australia) Garry Leggatt (Australia) David Seldon	Isuzu Gemini	129	43	
22	Up to 1600cc	71	Rejon Industries P/L	(Australia) Bernie McClure (Australia) David Langman	Holden Gemini	128	52	
23	Up to 1600cc	75	Victoria Police MSC	(Australia) Jim Faneco (Australia) Gary Rowe	Holden Gemini	126	48	
24	Up to 1600cc	74	Modulaire Air Conditioning	(Australia) Ken Price (Australia) Ian Wells	Holden Gemini	124	55	
25	1601cc - 2000cc	56	Jagparts	(Australia) Terry Wade (Australia) Gerald Kay	Triumph Dolomite Sprint	120	40	
26	Up to 1600cc	68	Bob Holden	(Australia) Bob Holden (Australia) David Earle	Ford Escort Mk.II 1.6	116	61	
27	1601cc - 2000cc	62	Jagparts	(Australia) Martin Power (Australia) Peter Kuebler	Triumph Dolomite Sprint	114	46	
28	Up to 1600cc	73	Lennox Motors	(Australia) Chris Heyer (Australia) Peter Lander	Volkswagen Golf	111	49	
DSQ	2001cc - 3000cc	42	Brian Boyd	(Australia) Lynn Brown (Australia) Brian Boyd	BMW 3.0Si	138	38	
DNF	3001cc - 6000cc	25	Allan Moffat Racing	(Canada) Allan Moffat (United Kingdom) John Fitzpatrick	Ford XC Falcon GS500 Hardtop	136		4
DSQ	Up to 1600cc	76	Re-Car Racing	(Australia) Allan Gough (Australia) Kel Gough	Holden Gemini	135	42	
DNF	2001cc - 3000cc	52	Masterton Homes Pty Ltd	(Australia) Steve Masterton (Australia) Phil Lucas	Ford Capri Mk.II	130	28	
DNF	3001cc - 6000cc	32	King George Tavern	(Australia) Fred Gibson (Australia) Joe Moore	Holden LX Torana SL/R 5000 A9X 4-Door	125	18	
NC	3001cc - 6000cc	3	John Goss Racing P/L	(Australia) John Goss (France) Henri Pescarolo	Ford XC Falcon GS500 Hardtop	118	58	
DNF	3001cc - 6000cc	13	TJ Slako	(New Zealand) Tim Slako (Australia) Colin Hall	Holden LX Torana SS A9X Hatchback	111	19	
DNF	2001cc - 3000cc	47	Barry Jones	(Australia) Barry Jones (Australia) Terry Finnigan	Mazda RX-3	106	26	
DNF	3001cc - 6000cc	33	Tony Packard Holden	(Australia) Bob Skelton (Australia) Don Holland	Holden LX Torana SS A9X Hatchback	105	44	
DNF	2001cc - 3000cc	50	Capri Components	(Australia) Lawrie Nelson (Australia) Tony Farrell	Ford Capri Mk.III	105	53	
NC	1601cc - 2000cc	55	Graham Mein	(Australia) Graham Mein (Australia) Geoff Russell	Ford Escort Mk.II RS2000	105	41	
DNF	3001cc - 6000cc	7	Ron Hodgson Racing	(Australia) Bob Morris (Austria) Dieter Quester	Holden LX Torana SS A9X Hatchback	95		2
DNF	3001cc - 6000cc	29	Garry Willmington Performance	(Australia) Garry Willmington (Australia) John Wright	Ford XC Falcon GS500 Hardtop	95	24	
DNF	3001cc - 6000cc	18	Brian Wood Ford	(Australia) Murray Carter (New Zealand) Graeme Lawrence	Ford XC Falcon GS500 Hardtop	74	14	
DNF	2001cc - 3000cc	40	Ross Burbidge	(Australia) Terry Shiel (Australia) Ross Burbidge	Mazda RX-7	72	36	
DNF	2001cc - 3000cc	43	Unipart Australia	(Australia) Lakis Manticas (Australia) Geoff Leeds	Ford Capri Mk.II	69	34	
DNF	3001cc - 6000cc	9	Nine Network Racing Team	(Australia) John McCormack (Australia) Bob Forbes	Chevrolet Camaro Z28	62	60	
DNF	3001cc - 6000cc	30	Everlast Battery Service	(Australia) Bill O'Brien (Australia) Ray Winter	Ford XC Falcon GS500 Hardtop	62	21	
DNF	3001cc - 6000cc	26	Marlboro Holden Dealer Team	(Australia) John Harvey (Australia) Ron Harrop	Holden LX Torana SS A9X Hatchback	57	11	
DNF	3001cc - 6000cc	11	Citizen Watches Aust. P/L	(Australia) Gary Cooke (Australia) Warwick Brown	Holden LX Torana SL/R 5000 A9X 4-Door	57		8
DNF	Up to 1600cc	69	Victoria Police MSC	(Australia) Mal Smith (Australia) Mal Owen	Holden Gemini	51	56	
DNF	1601cc - 2000cc	61	Brian Hilton Toyota	(Australia) Graeme Bailey (Australia) Doug Clark	Toyota Celica	46	35	
DNF	Up to 1600cc	77	Peter Williamson P/L	(United Kingdom) Mark Thatcher (Japan) Kiyoshi Misaki	Toyota Corolla Levin	41	54	
DNF	3001cc - 6000cc	35	B Parsons / T Rabold	(Australia) Barry Parsons (Australia) Tom Rabold	Ford XC Falcon Cobra #35 Hardtop	38	63	
DNF	3001cc - 6000cc	22	Settlement Road Motor Wreckers	(Australia) Warren Cullen (New Zealand) Graham McRae	Holden LX Torana SS A9X Hatchback	30	13	
DNF	3001cc - 6000cc	36	Brian Wood Ford	(Australia) Rod Stevens (Australia) Bill Evans	Ford XC Falcon GS500 Hardtop	24	25	
DNF	1601cc - 2000cc	54	Roger Cartwright	(Australia) Roger Cartwright (Australia) Greg Toepfer	Ford Escort Mk.II RS2000	24	62	
DNF	3001cc - 6000cc	17	Bryan Byrt Ford	(Australia) Dick Johnson (Australia) Gary Scott	Ford XC Falcon GS500 Hardtop	24		9
DNF	3001cc - 6000cc	4	Thompson Ford	(Australia) Colin Bond (Australia) John French	Ford XC Falcon GS500 Hardtop	23		10
DNF	1601cc - 2000cc	60	Bill Stanley	(Australia) Bill Stanley (Australia) Ian Messner	Ford Escort Mk.II RS2000	23	45	
DNF	3001cc - 6000cc	27	Denmac Ford P/L	(Australia) Ron Wanless (New Zealand) Leo Leonard	Ford XC Falcon GS500 Hardtop	21	12	
DNF	3001cc - 6000cc	2	AWA-Thorn Consumer Products	(Australia) Ron Dickson (United States) Dick Barbour	Chevrolet Camaro Z28	16	59	
DNF	2001cc - 3000cc	45	Precinct Performance P/L	(Australia) Dean Gall (Australia) Allan Bryant	Mazda RX-7	16	57	
DNF	3001cc - 6000cc	10	Rusty French Racing	(Australia) Rusty French (Australia) Graham Moore	Ford XC Falcon GS500 Hardtop	9	23	
DNS	1601cc - 2000cc	53	Ken Harrison	(Australia) Ken Harrison (Australia) Ray Cutchie	Ford Escort Mk.II RS2000		51	
DNS	Up to 1600cc	72	Lennox Motors	(Australia) Peter Lander (Australia) Paul Bernasconi	Volkswagen Golf			

== Statistics ==
- Provisional Pole Position - #05 Peter Brock - 2:26.8
- Pole Position - #05 Peter Brock - 2:20.500
- Fastest Lap - #05 Peter Brock - 2:21.1 - Lap 163 (lap record)
- Average Speed - 152 km/h
- Race Time - 6:38:15.8
