= 1978 Hardie-Ferodo 1000 =

Motor race in Australia

Seasons
- ← 1977 1979 →

Layout of the Mount Panorama Circuit (1938-1986)

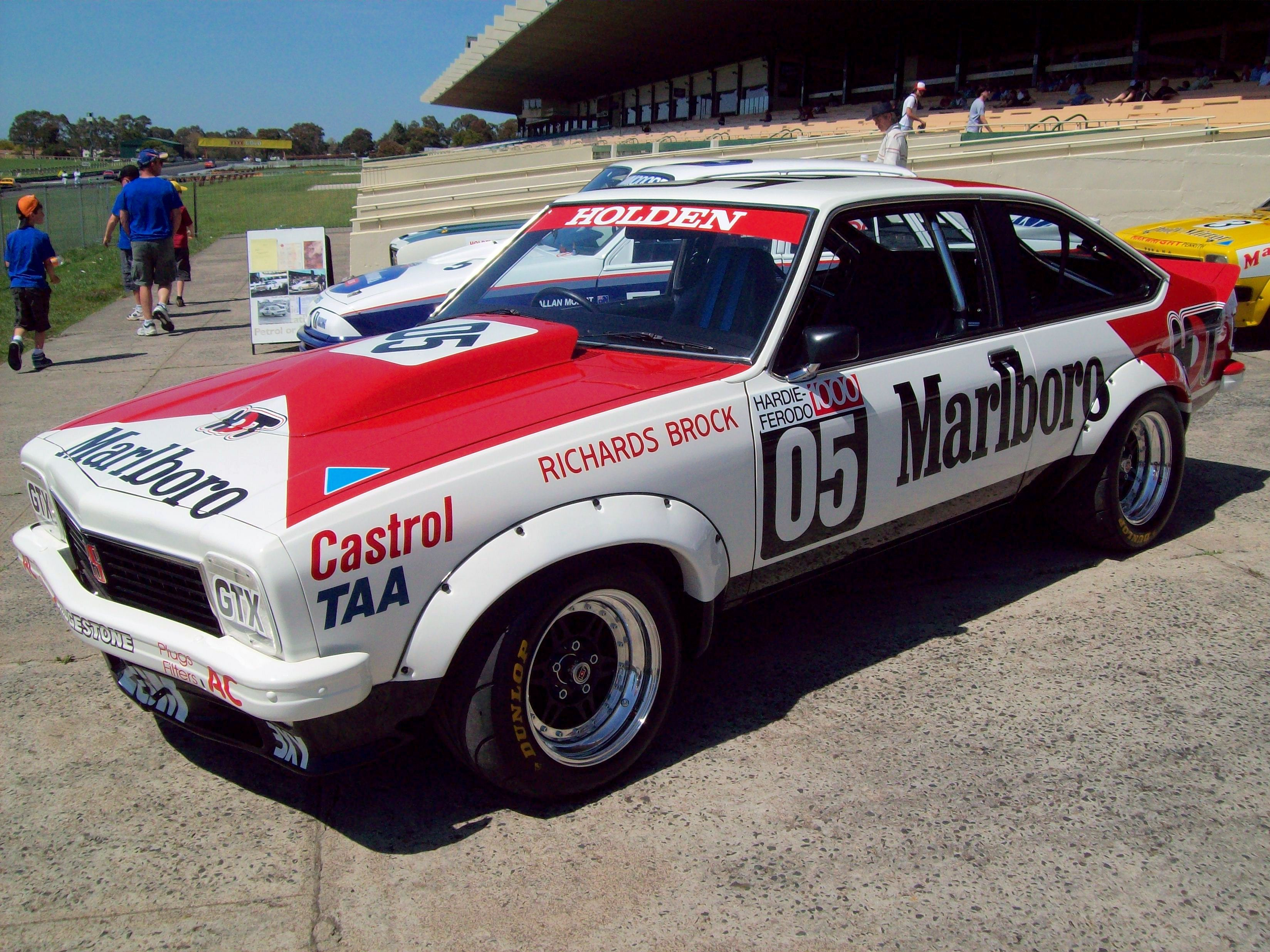
Peter Brock and Jim Richards replica of the 1979 race winning Holden LX Torana SS A9X on display at the 2009 Historic Sandown

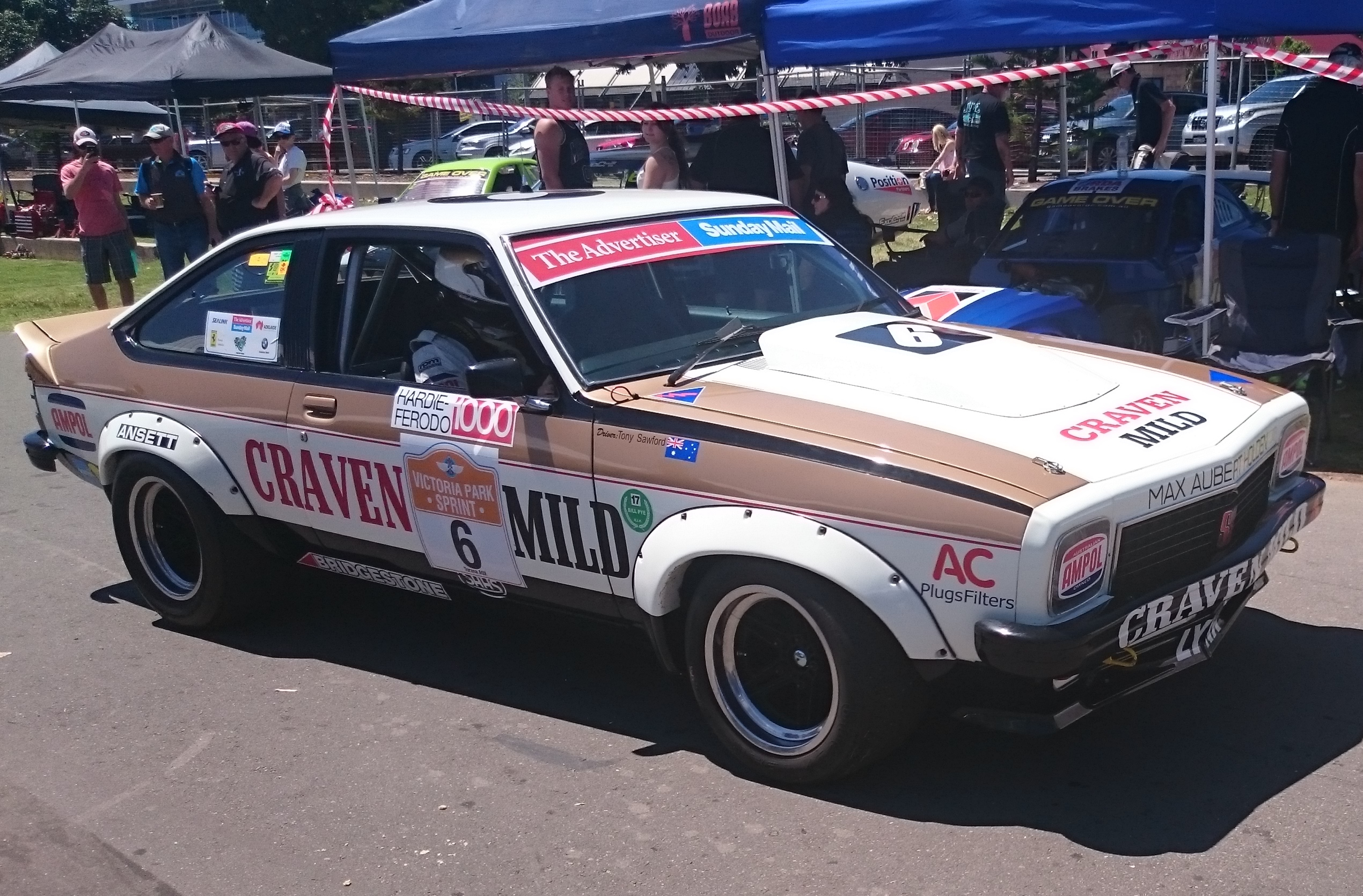
The Allan Grice/John Leffler Holden LX Torana SS A9X which placed second in race. The car is pictured in 2015.

The 1978 Hardie-Ferodo 1000 was the 19th running of the Bathurst 1000 touring car race. It was held on 1 October 1978, at the Mount Panorama Circuit just outside Bathurst. The race was open to cars eligible to the locally developed CAMS Group C touring car regulations with three engine capacity based classes.

The race was won by Peter Brock, his third win, and Sports Sedan racer Jim Richards, his first. The pair drove a Holden Dealer Team Holden Torana to a single lap victory over another Torana, that of Allan Grice and Formula 5000 driver John Leffler. Third was the first of the Ford Falcons, that of veteran Murray Carter and New Zealand open wheel great Graeme Lawrence. Richards became the first New Zealander to win the race and it was the Holden Dealer Teams third win.

== Class structure ==
=== Class A ===
The 3001 - 6000cc class consisted entirely of compact muscle cars including V8 Holden Toranas and Ford Falcons.

=== Class B ===
The 2001 – 3000cc class featured Mazda RX-3, Ford Capri, and BMW 3.0Si.

=== Class C ===
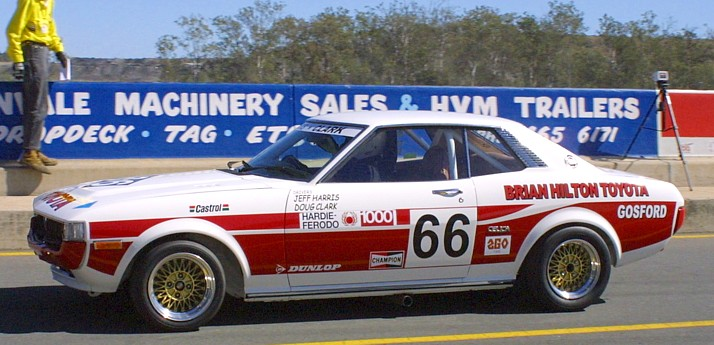
Harris/Clark Toyota Celica

The Up to 2000cc class saw a mix of Alfa Romeo Alfetta and GTV 2000, Ford Escort RS2000, Holden Gemini, Toyota Celica, Triumph Dolomite and VW Golf.

== Hardies Heroes ==
1978 saw the introduction of the Hardies Heroes Top 10 runoff (now referred as the Top Ten Shootout) for pole position, devised by race broadcaster Channel 7 and the Australian Racing Drivers Club (ARDC) for extra television time on the day before the race. With official qualifying now held on the Friday (previously held on the Saturday before the race from 1963-1977), the runoff was held on the Saturday morning with Seven showing half-hour highlights around Australia later in the afternoon. Drivers drew the order in which they would run out of a hat with the order being Allan Grice, Peter Brock, Jack Brabham, Dick Johnson, Derek Bell, Bob Morris, Garth Wigston, Colin Bond, John French and lucky last Allan Moffat. Each driver had two, one lap runs to set a quick time, though the second lap was optional.

Morning showers meant that the track was damp during the first run and with most cars on wet weather tyres, times reflected this with Grice recording a first up 2:38.2 and Brock a 2:35.6. No other driver was then able to lap better than 2:27 until Allan Moffat went out and ignoring the puddles (plus a little help from team members on top of the mountain who radioed in that the track was now dry enough for slicks), ran a 2:21.59 lap while hitting 159 mph (256 km/h) on Conrod Straight. Moffat's time in his 5.8 L V8 powered Ford Falcon Cobra was some 6 seconds faster than anyone else had managed and 4.8 seconds under his own Group C Touring Car lap record set in 1977. Taking Moffat's cue that the track was now dry enough for quick times, Brock then ran a 2:20.006 in his HDT Torana which was enough to give him his second Bathurst pole in succession and his third overall (his pole time would not be beaten until 1982). Moffat's team mate Colin Bond then joined Brock on the front row with a 2:20.871 lap (0.865 slower than Brock), and while Moffat then tried to respond, he had to settle for the inside of the second row with a time of 2:21.597. Bob Morris, the fastest in official qualifying with a 2:21.7 would start in fourth after equaling his time in the runoff, with his team mate Derek Bell rounding out the top 5, though he was some 2.8 seconds slower than Morris. John French in the second Bryan Byrt Ford Falcon was the slowest in the runoff, his time some 10.2 seconds slower than Brock's pole time and 4.6 seconds slower than team mate Dick Johnson.

Pos	No	Team	Driver	Car	Time
Pole	05	Marlboro Holden Dealer Team	(Australia) Peter Brock	Holden LX Torana SS A9X Hatchback	2:20.006
2	2	Moffat Ford Dealers	(Australia) Colin Bond	Ford XC Falcon Cobra	2:20.871
3	1	Moffat Ford Dealers	(Canada) Allan Moffat	Ford XC Falcon Cobra	2:21.597
4	7	Ron Hodgson Channel 7 Racing	(Australia) Bob Morris	Holden LX Torana SS A9X Hatchback	2:21.766
5	27	Ron Hodgson Channel 7 Racing	(United Kingdom) Derek Bell	Holden LX Torana SS A9X Hatchback	2:24.602
6	17	Bryan Byrt Ford	(Australia) Dick Johnson	Ford XC Falcon GS500 Hardtop	2:25.632
7	6	Craven Mild Racing	(Australia) Allan Grice	Holden LX Torana SS A9X Hatchback	2:25.950
8	8	Jack Brabham Holdings Pty Ltd	(Australia) Jack Brabham	Holden LX Torana SS A9X 4 Door	2:25.988
9	20	Roadways / Gown-Hindhaugh	(Australia) Garth Wigston	Holden LX Torana SS A9X Hatchback	2:26.144
10	32	Bryan Byrt Ford	(Australia) John French	Ford XC Falcon GS500 Hardtop	2:30.244

* Bob Morris was fastest qualifier going into Hardies Heroes in his Holden LX Torana SS A9X Hatchback with a 2:21.7 lap, and although he equalled this time in the shootout, he fell to 4th on the grid.
* Dick Johnson made the first of 20 consecutive starts in the Top 10 runoff at Bathurst. He finished the shootout in 6th position in his Ford XC Falcon GS500 Hardtop.
* Peter Brock's pole time of 2:20.006 would stand as the fastest pole time at Bathurst until Allan Grice recorded a 2:17.501 to claim pole in a Holden VH Commodore SS in 1982. Brock's 5.0L, 308 cui V8 Torana was timed at 157 mph (253 km/h) on Conrod Straight, only 2 mph (3 km/h) slower than the big 5.8L, 351 cui V8 Ford Falcon Cobra of rival Allan Moffat.
* Triple Formula One World Champion Jack Brabham qualified for his only top 10 shootout at Bathurst in a 4-Door version of the A9X Torana, finishing in 8th position. The Brabham name would not appear in another Bathurst Top 10 runoff until his son David qualified 8th in 1993 in a Holden VP Commodore.
* The top 10 consisted of 6 Holden Toranas and 4 Ford Falcons. While the Toranas were spread over 5 different teams, the Falcons only came from Moffat Ford Dealers and Bryan Byrt Ford.

== Results ==
Pos	Class	No	Team	Drivers	Car	Laps	Qual Pos	Shootout Pos
1	A	05	Marlboro Holden Dealer Team	(Australia) Peter Brock (New Zealand) Jim Richards	Holden LX Torana SS A9X Hatchback	163		1
2	A	6	Craven Mild Racing	(Australia) Allan Grice (Australia) John Leffler	Holden LX Torana SS A9X Hatchback	162		7
3	A	18	Brian Wood Ford	(Australia) Murray Carter (New Zealand) Graeme Lawrence	Ford XC Falcon GS500 Hardtop	160	31	
4	A	11	Citizens Watches Australia Pty Ltd	(Australia) Gary Cooke (Australia) Doug Chivas	Holden LX Torana SLR5000 A9X 4 Door	158	27	
5	A	17	Bryan Byrt Ford	(Australia) Dick Johnson (Australia) Vern Schuppan	Ford XC Falcon GS500 Hardtop	153		6
6	A	8	Jack Brabham Holdings Pty Ltd	(Australia) Jack Brabham (Australia) Brian Muir	Holden LX Torana SLR5000 A9X 4 Door	153		8
7	A	23	Settlement Road Motor Wreckers	(Australia) Warren Cullen (Australia) Johnnie Walker	Holden LX Torana SS A9X Hatchback	152	13	
8	A	33	Amco Pty Ltd	(Australia) Barry Seton (Australia) Don Smith	Holden LX Torana SS A9X Hatchback	152	15	
9	C	69	Brian Wood Ford	(Australia) Rod Stevens (Australia) Bill Evans	Ford Escort RS2000 Mk.I	149	38	
10	B	52	Amco Pty Ltd	(Australia) Steve Masterton (Australia) Phil Lucas	Ford Capri Mk.I	149	40	
11	C	70	Peter Williamson Pty Ltd	(Australia) Peter Williamson (Australia) Mike Quinn	Toyota Celica	149	36	
12	B	41	B&J Tyre Co Pty Ltd	(Australia) Terry Shiel (Australia) Ross Burbidge	Mazda RX-3	148	37	
13	B	42	Fury Ford Pty Ltd	(Australia) Terry Daly (Australia) Eric Boord	Ford Capri Mk.I	148	30	
14	B	37	Shell Sport	(Australia) Peter Hopwood (Australia) Jim Davidson	Ford Capri Mk.II	147	35	
15	B	35	Amco Pty Ltd	(Australia) Don Holland (Australia) Lawrie Nelson	Ford Capri Mk.II	145	29	
16	C	62	Greater Pacific Finance Co	(Australia) Ray Gulson (Australia) Paul Gulson	Alfa Romeo GTV 2000	143	55	
17	B	48	James Mason Pty Ltd	(Australia) Barry Jones (Australia) Brian Potts	Mazda RX-3	142	63	
18	C	57	Thomson Ford	(Australia) Bill Stanley (Australia) Ian Messner	Ford Escort RS2000 Mk.II	142	52	
19	A	15	Marlboro Holden Dealer Team	(Australia) John Harvey (Australia) Charlie O'Brien	Holden LX Torana SS A9X Hatchback	139	11	
20	B	51	JD Duggan	(Australia) John Duggan (Australia) Brian Wheeler	Mazda RX-3	137	45	
21	B	36	Arthur Hardwick	(Australia) Arthur Hardwick (Australia) Greg McCombie	Mazda RX-3	136	34	
22	A	10	Garry & Warren Smith Pty Ltd	(Australia) Bob Forbes (Australia) Kevin Bartlett	Holden LX Torana SS A9X Hatchback	136	12	
23	A	29	Garry Willmington	(Australia) Garry Willmington (Australia) Jeff Barnes	Ford XC Falcon GS500 Hardtop	136	23	
24	A	19	Bonds Coates Patons	(Australia) Graham Ryan (Australia) Phillip Arnull	Holden LX Torana SS A9X Hatchback	135	20	
25	C	73	B&G Myers Leyland	(Australia) Terry Wade (Australia) John Myers	Triumph Dolomite Sprint	134	47	
26	C	60	Peter Brown	(Australia) Peter Brown (Australia) Graham Ritter	Alfa Romeo GTV 2000	133	41	
27	B	43	Gough Motors Mazda	(Australia) Nick Louis (Australia) Stephen Stockdale	Mazda RX-3	132	43	
28	C	54	Bruce T Hodgson	(Australia) Bruce Hodgson (Australia) Dave Morrow	Ford Escort RS2000 Mk.II	130	46	
29	C	66	Brian Hilton Toyota	(Australia) Jeff Harris (Australia) Doug Clark	Toyota Celica	128	58	
30	A	28	Rod Donovan	(Australia) Rod Donovan (Australia) Craig McAllister	Ford XC Falcon GS500 Hardtop	125	24	
31	C	61	Consolidated Pneumatic Tools Co (Aust) Pty Ltd	(Australia) Ian Sonneman (Australia) John English	Ford Escort RS2000 Mk.I	121	50	
DNF	A	26	Craven Mild Racing	(Australia) Ralph Radburn (Australia) Robyn Hamilton	Holden LX Torana SLR5000 A9X 4 Door	148	21	
DNF	B	49	ABE Copiers Pty Ltd	(Australia) Sue Ransom (Australia) Bill Brown	Ford Capri Mk.I	144	33	
DNF	A	31	Norm G Smith Racing	(New Zealand) Leo Leonard (Australia) Gary Sprague	Ford XC Falcon GS500 Hardtop	119	18	
DNF	A	20	Roadways / Gown-Hindhaugh	(Australia) Garth Wigston (Australia) Wayne Negus	Holden LX Torana SS A9X Hatchback	118		9
DNF	C	65	LR Morris	(Australia) Rod Morris (Australia) Terry Finnigan	Ford Escort RS2000 Mk.II	115	56	
DNF	A	9	ReCar Racing / Cadbury - Schweppes	(New Zealand) Peter Janson (Australia) Phil Brock	Holden LX Torana SS A9X Hatchback	110	14	
DNF	C	59	Kevin Dennis Motors (Sunshine) Pty Ltd	(Australia) Allan Gough (Australia) Kel Gough	Holden Gemini	109	59	
DNF	A	14	Thomson Ford	(Australia) Ron Dickson (Australia) John McCormack	Ford XC Falcon GS500 Hardtop	100	16	
DNF	C	56	Paul-Francois Berthier	(Australia) Paul Berthier (Australia) Bob Wootton	Triumph Dolomite Sprint	95	49	
DNF	C	63	Bob Holden / Shell Sport	(Australia) Bob Holden (Australia) Lyndon Arnel	Ford Escort RS2000 Mk.II	93	48	
DNF	A	34	Tim Slako	(Australia) Tim Slako (Australia) Colin Hall	Holden LX Torana SS A9X Hatchback	92	26	
DNF	B	50	ATP Australia Pty Ltd	(Australia) Alan Cant (Australia) Bruce Stewart	Ford Capri Mk.I	91	61	
DNF	A	4	John Goss Pty Ltd	(Australia) Rusty French (Australia) Graham Moore	Ford XC Falcon GS500 Hardtop	90	25	
DNF	C	64	Bob Holden / Shell Sport	(Australia) Greville Arnel (Australia) Greg Toepfer	Ford Escort RS2000 Mk.II	89	51	
DNF	B	39	Citizens Watches Australia Pty Ltd	(Australia) Barry Lee (Australia) David Clement	Mazda RX-3	82	44	
DNF	A	1	Moffat Ford Dealers	(Canada) Allan Moffat (Belgium) Jacky Ickx	Ford XC Falcon Cobra	81		3
DNF	A	24	Hendersons Federal Spring Works / Shell Sport	(Australia) Jim Keogh (Australia) Grant Walker	Ford XC Falcon GS500 Hardtop	74	19	
DNF	A	7	Ron Hodgson Channel 7 Racing	(Australia) Bob Morris (United Kingdom) John Fitzpatrick	Holden LX Torana SS A9X Hatchback	73		4
DNF	A	13	Scotty Taylor Holden	(Australia) Alan "Scotty" Taylor (Australia) Kevin Kennedy	Holden LX Torana SS A9X Hatchback	68	22	
DNF	A	3	John Goss Pty Ltd	(Australia) John Goss (France) Henri Pescarolo	Ford XC Falcon GS500 Hardtop	67	28	
DNF	B	46	Brian Wood Ford	(Australia) Ray Farrar (Australia) Gerry Wittenden	Ford Capri Mk.I	66	62	
DNF	B	47	Selby's Steering & Suspension Service Pty Ltd	(Australia) Dean Gall (Australia) Allan Bryant	Mazda RX-3	61	54	
DNF	A	2	Moffat Ford Dealers	(Australia) Colin Bond (Australia) Fred Gibson	Ford XC Falcon Cobra	59		2
DNF	A	32	Bryan Byrt Ford	(Australia) John French (Australia) Warwick Brown	Ford XC Falcon GS500 Hardtop	57		10
DNF	C	53	Lennox Motors	(Australia) Chris Heyer (West Germany) Rudi Dahlhauser	Volkswagen Golf GTi	35	60	
DNF	B	44	Geoff Leeds	(Australia) Cam Worner (Australia) Geoff Leeds	Ford Capri Mk.I	29	32	
DNF	A	12	Bob Jane T-Marts	(Australia) Ian Geoghegan (Australia) Garry Rogers	Holden LX Torana SS A9X Hatchback	29	17	
DNF	B	45	Robert Darley	(Australia) Jim Hunter (Australia) Barry Lake	BMW 530i	27	53	
DNF	B	40	Phil McDonell	(Australia) Phil McDonnell (Australia) Lynn Brown	BMW 3.0Si	21	39	
DNF	C	72	Alf Grant	(Australia) Alf Grant (Australia) Geoff Russell	Alfa Romeo GTV 2000	21	57	
DNF	A	27	Ron Hodgson Channel 7 Racing	(United Kingdom) Derek Bell (Austria) Dieter Quester	Holden LX Torana SS A9X Hatchback	5		5
DNF	C	71	Brian Foley Pty Ltd	(Australia) Garry Leggatt (Belgium) Patrick Nève	Alfa Romeo Alfetta GTV	3	42	
DNS	A	30	Everlast Battery Service	(Australia) Bill O'Brien (Australia) Ray Winter	Ford XB Falcon GT Hardtop			
DNS	C	74	Rejon Industries Pty Ltd	(Australia) Bernie McClure (Australia) David Langman	Holden Gemini			

== Statistics ==
- Provisional Pole Position - #7 Bob Morris - 2:21.7
- Pole Position - #05 Peter Brock - 2:20.006
- Fastest Lap - #1 Allan Moffat - 2:22.0 (lap record)
- Average Speed - 149 km/h
- Race Time - 6:45:53.9
