= Formation finish =

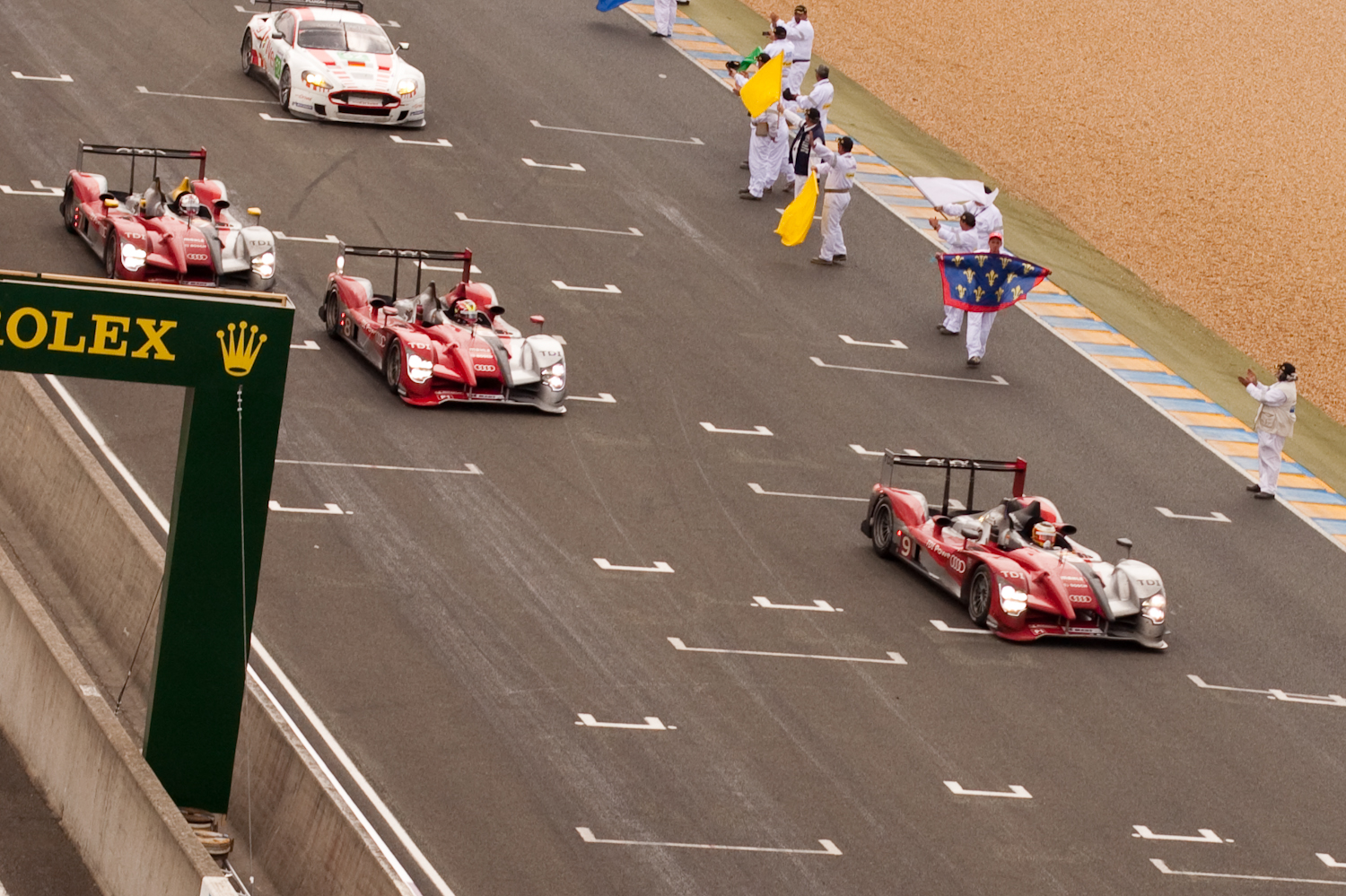
Formation finish set by Audi at the 2010 24 Hours of Le Mans

A formation finish in a motor race is when multiple vehicles of the same team cross the finish line in formation, usually side-by-side. Typically it happens when a team's car are running in the top positions at the end of the race with a clear advantage over their competitors. Team directors often orchestrate formation finishes to demonstrate their superiority. A formation finish should not be confused with a "1–2 finish"; not all formation finishes occur as a result of a team's cars finishing first and second in a race, and not all 1–2 finishes are completed in formation.

== 24 Hours of Le Mans ==
Ferrari had a 1-2-3 formation finish at the 1965 24 Hours of Le Mans. Rival car manufacturer Ford did the same in 1966, and Ferrari again in 1967. Porsche had a three-car formation finish in 1982.

Audi and Bentley, part of the Volkswagen Group, dominated the 24 Hours of Le Mans in the 2000s, doing several formation finishes to celebrate. However, Peugeot won in 2009 with a three-car formation finish. In 2013, Audi was set for another three-car formation finish, but Toyota spoiled the show by crossing the line before the second and third placed Audis.

== Formula One ==
To celebrate his 1991 Formula One title, Ayrton Senna slowed down at the last corner of the Japanese Grand Prix to let his teammate Gerhard Berger overtake him and finish in formation. At the 2002 United States Grand Prix, Michael Schumacher – who had won ten races during the season – slowed down in the final lap to set a formation finish with Ferrari teammate Rubens Barrichello. The Brazilian also slowed down in the final metres, but ended up winning the race by 0.011 seconds.

== Bathurst 1000 ==
The Bathurst 1000 has seen a number of formation finishes. The first occurred in 1977 when Allan Moffat and Colin Bond spent the majority of the final lap side-by-side in their Ford XC Falcons. The Holden Dealer Team repeated the feat in 1984, with Peter Brock slowing on the final lap to allow teammate David Parsons to cross the finish line next to him. Triple Eight Race Engineering are the most recent team to perform a formation finish at Bathurst, when Craig Lowndes and Jamie Whincup finished the race side-by-side in 2010.
