= Mal Smith =

Australian rules footballer

Personal information
- Full name: Malcolm John Smith
- Born: 5 February 1934
- Died: 19 August 2006 (aged 72)
- Original team: Eaglehawk
- Height: 173 cm (5 ft 8 in)
- Weight: 72 kg (159 lb)

Playing career^{1}
Years	Club	Games (Goals)
1958	South Melbourne	5 (6)
- ^{1} Playing statistics correct to the end of 1958.

Malcolm John Smith (5 February 1934 – 19 August 2006) was an Australian rules footballer who played with South Melbourne in the Victorian Football League (VFL).
