= 1977 Hardie-Ferodo 1000 =

Motor race in Australia

Seasons
- ← 1976 1978 →

Layout of the Mount Panorama Circuit (1938-1986)

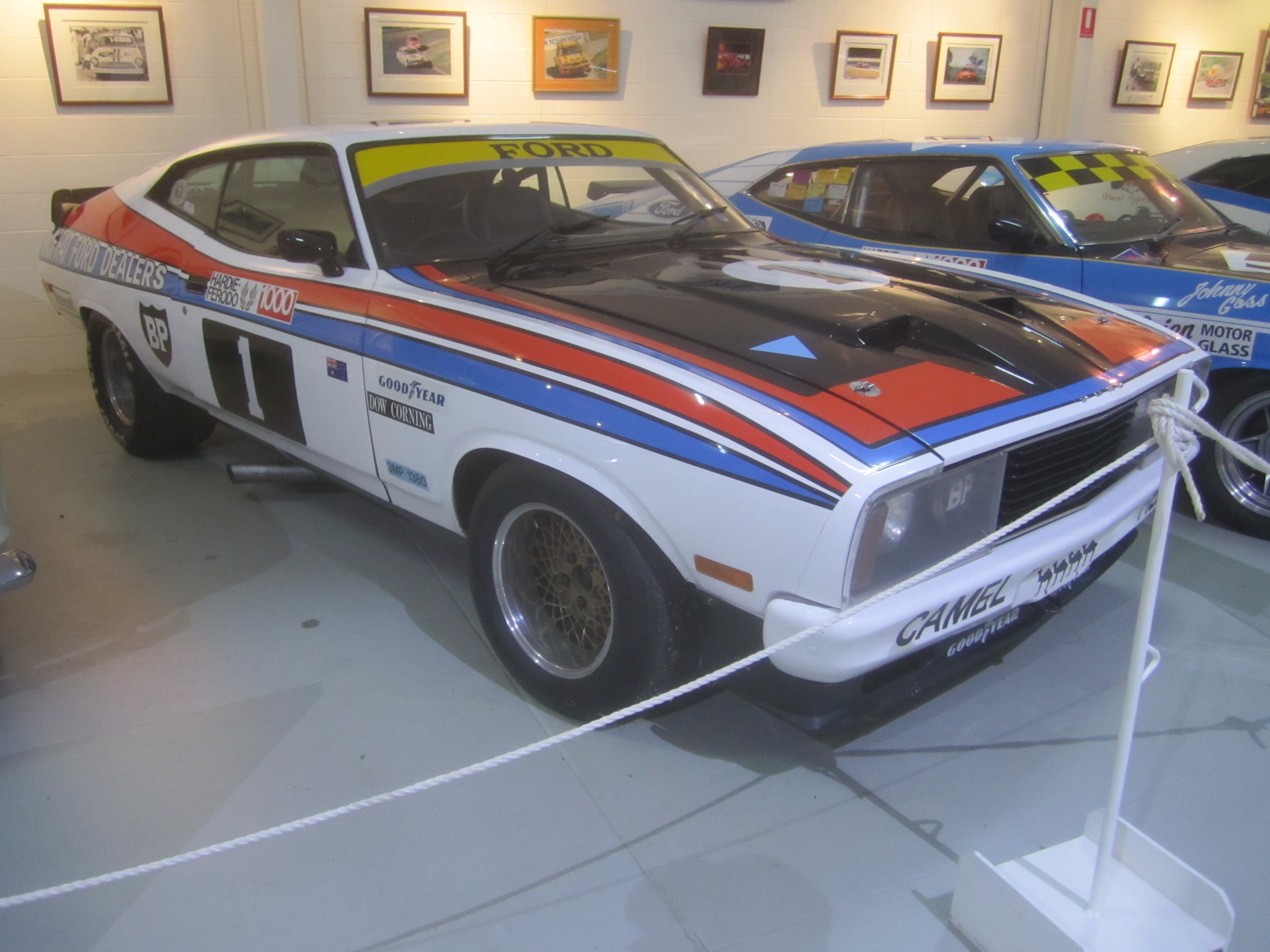
Allan Moffat and Jacky Ickx won the race driving a Ford Falcon XC

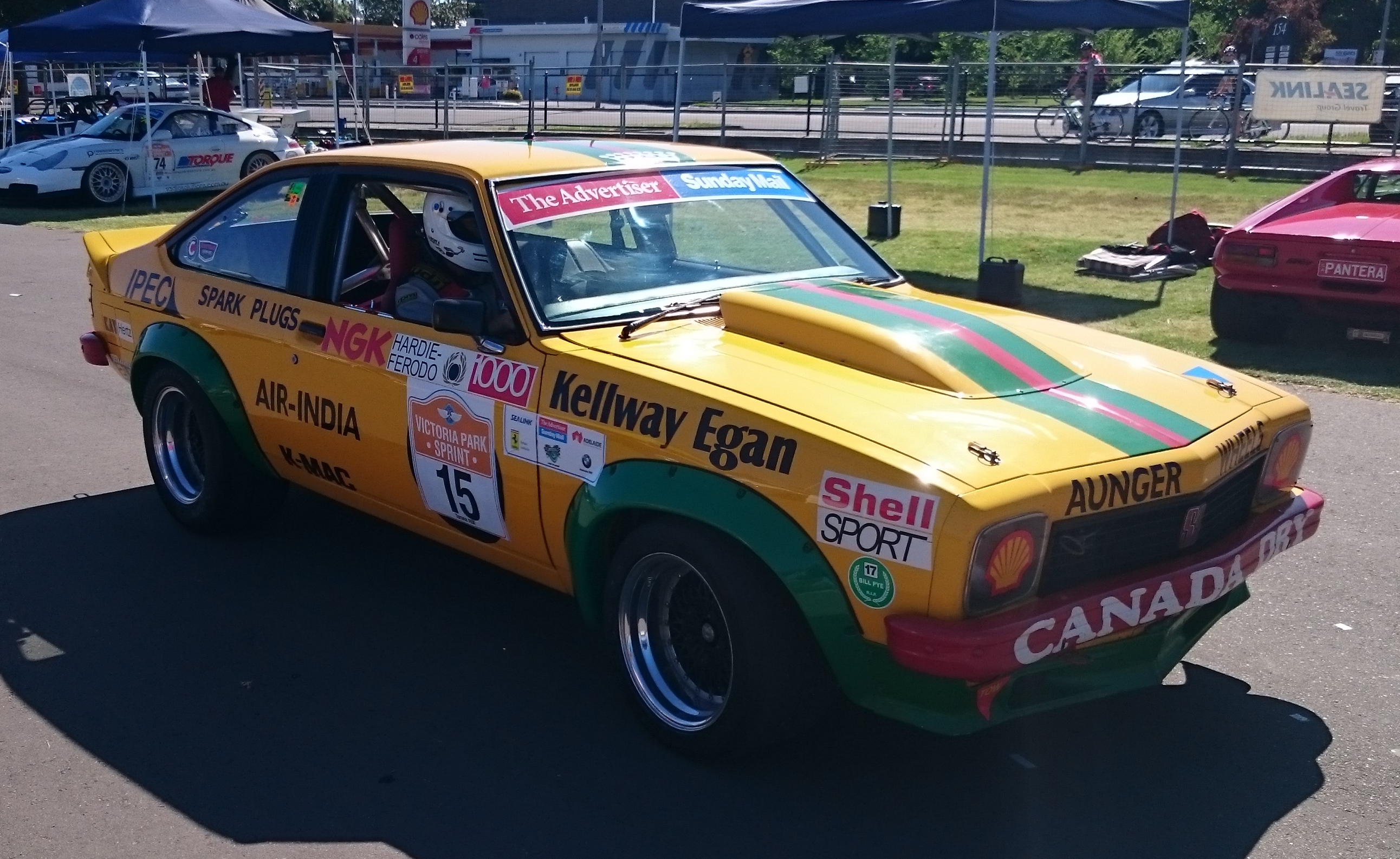
Peter Janson and Larry Perkins placed third in a Holden LX Torana SS A9X. (Car pictured in 2015)

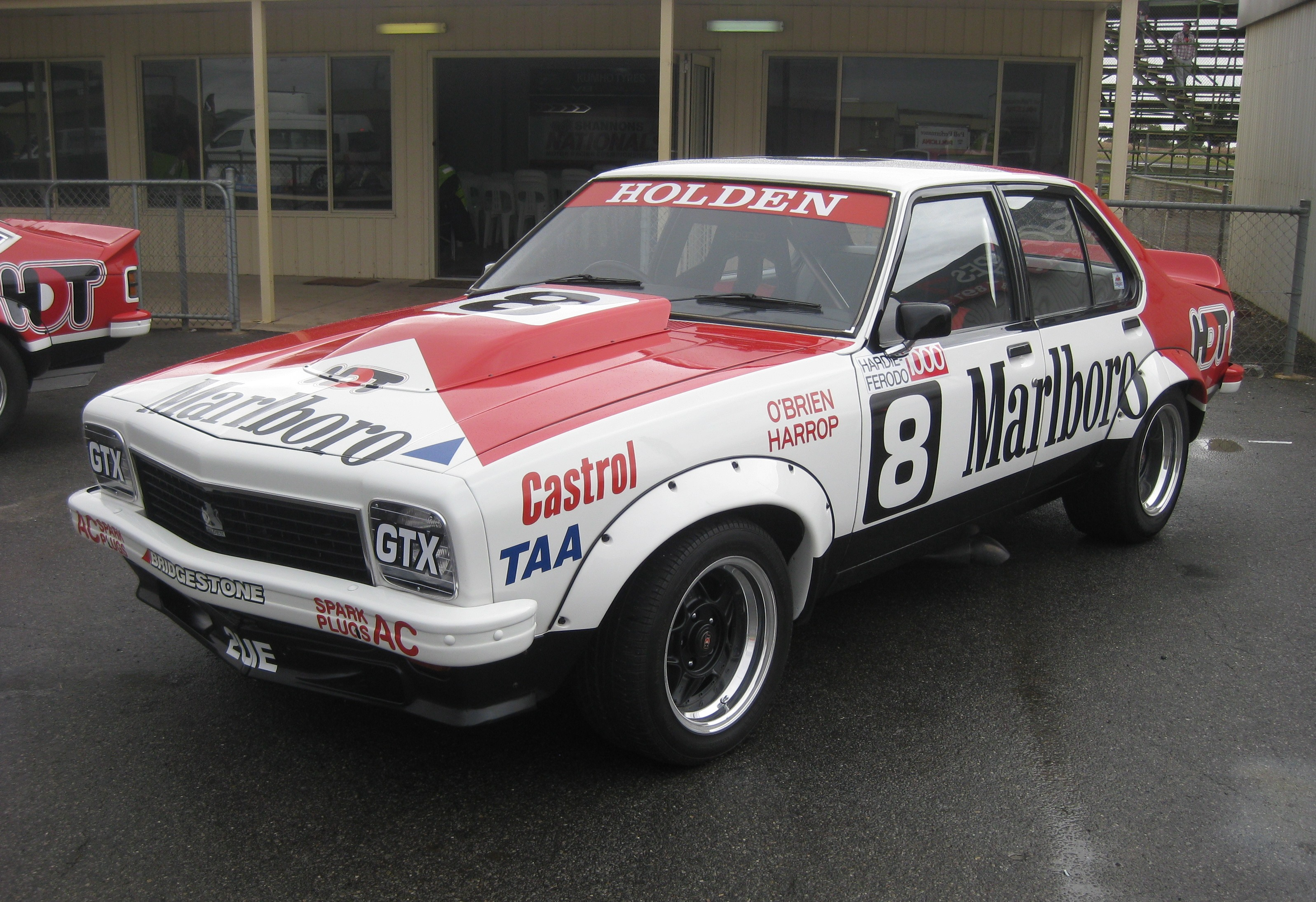
Charlie O'Brien and Ron Harrop placed fifth in a Holden LX Torana SL/R 5000 A9X entered by the Holden Dealer Team

The 1977 Bathurst 1000, known for naming rights reasons as the Hardie-Ferodo 1000, was a motor race for Group C Touring Cars, held on 2 October 1977 at the Mount Panorama Circuit in Bathurst, New South Wales, Australia. It was the 18th running of the Bathurst 1000.

The Moffat Ford Dealers team staged a formation finish with the Allan Moffat and Jacky Ickx Ford Falcon XC leading the Colin Bond and Alan Hamilton entry. Peter Janson and Larry Perkins finished third in a Holden Torana.

A dispute between Bond and Moffat over prize money was not settled until 1985.

== Class structure ==
Cars competed in three engine displacement classes:

=== 3001cc – 6000cc ===
The class was contested by Holden Torana and Ford Falcon entries.

=== 2001cc – 3000cc ===
The class was contested by Mazda RX-3, Ford Capri and BMW 3.0Si entries.

=== Up to 2000cc ===
The class was contested by Alfa Romeo Alfetta and 2000 GTV, BMW 2002, Ford Escort RS2000, Holden Gemini, Toyota Celica, Triumph Dolomite and Volkswagen Golf entries.

== Top 10 Qualifiers ==
| Pos | No | Team | Driver | Car | Qual |
|---|---|---|---|---|---|
| Pole | 25 | Bill Patterson Racing | (Australia) Peter Brock | Holden LX Torana SS A9X Hatchback | 2:24.1 |
| 2 | 2 | Moffat Ford Dealers | (Australia) Colin Bond | Ford XC Falcon GS500 Hardtop | 2:25.2 |
| 3 | 1 | Moffat Ford Dealers | (Canada) Allan Moffat | Ford XC Falcon GS500 Hardtop | 2:25.6 |
| 4 | 6 | Craven Mild Racing | (Australia) Allan Grice | Holden LX Torana SS A9X Hatchback | 2:25.8 |
| 5 | 3 | Bob Jane 2UW Racing | (Australia) Ian Geoghegan | Holden LX Torana SS A9X Hatchback | 2:25.9 |
| 6 | 10 | Melford Motors | (New Zealand) Jim Richards | Ford XB Falcon GT Hardtop | 2:26.0 |
| 7 | 7 | Ron Hodgson Motors | (Australia) Bob Morris | Holden LX Torana SL/R 5000 A9X 4-Door | 2:26.6 |
| 8 | 14 | Holden Dealer Team | (Australia) John Harvey | Holden LX Torana SS A9X Hatchback | 2:26.8 |
| 9 | 4 | John Goss Racing Pty Ltd | (Australia) Jack Brabham | Ford XC Falcon GS500 Hardtop | 2:26.9 |
| 10 | 8 | Holden Dealer Team | (Australia) Charlie O'Brien | Holden LX Torana SL/R 5000 A9X 4-Door | 2:27.2 |

== Results ==
| Pos | Class | No | Entrant | Drivers | Car | Laps | Qual Pos |
|---|---|---|---|---|---|---|---|
| 1 | 3001cc – 6000cc | 1 | Moffat Ford Dealers | (Canada) Allan Moffat (Belgium) Jacky Ickx | Ford XC Falcon GS500 Hardtop | 163 | 3 |
| 2 | 3001cc – 6000cc | 2 | Moffat Ford Dealers | (Australia) Colin Bond (Australia) Alan Hamilton | Ford XC Falcon GS500 Hardtop | 163 | 2 |
| 3 | 3001cc – 6000cc | 15 | NGK Janson | (New Zealand) Peter Janson (Australia) Larry Perkins | Holden LX Torana SS A9X Hatchback | 162 | 13 |
| 4 | 3001cc – 6000cc | 25 | Bill Patterson Racing | (Australia) Peter Brock (Australia) Phil Brock | Holden LX Torana SS A9X Hatchback | 162 | 1 |
| 5 | 3001cc – 6000cc | 8 | Holden Dealer Team | (Australia) Charlie O'Brien (Australia) Ron Harrop | Holden LX Torana SL/R 5000 A9X 4-Door | 162 | 10 |
| 6 | 2001cc – 3000cc | 33 | Amco Pty Ltd | (Australia) Barry Seton (Australia) Don Smith | Ford Capri Mk.I | 154 | 27 |
| 7 | 3001cc – 6000cc | 26 | Bill Patterson Racing | (Australia) Tony Roberts (Australia) Doug Chivas | Holden LH Torana SL/R 5000 L34 | 154 | 21 |
| 8 | Up to 2000cc | 58 | Brian Foley Pty Ltd | (United Kingdom) Derek Bell (Australia) Garry Leggatt | Alfa Romeo 2000 GTV | 150 | 37 |
| 9 | Up to 2000cc | 69 | Brian Wood Ford | (Australia) Rod Stevens (Australia) Tony Farrell | Ford Escort RS2000 Mk.I | 150 | 41 |
| 10 | 3001cc – 6000cc | 12 | Pioneer Electronics | (Australia) Ron Dickson (Australia) Fred Gibson | Ford XB Falcon GT Hardtop | 147 | 22 |
| 11 | Up to 2000cc | 59 | Douglas Hi Fi | (Australia) Frank Porter (Australia) Jim Murcott | Alfa Romeo Alfetta GTAm | 146 | 47 |
| 12 | Up to 2000cc | 61 | Ray Gulson | (Australia) Ray Gulson (Australia) David Crowther | Alfa Romeo 2000 GTV | 145 | 48 |
| 13 | 2001cc – 3000cc | 43 | Larry Dixon's Great Doncaster Road Motor Show | (Australia) Nick Louis (Australia) Ted Brewster | Mazda RX-3 | 145 | 45 |
| 14 | 2001cc – 3000cc | 38 | Quick Fit Spares and Accessories | (Australia) Phil McDonnell (Australia) Jim Hunter | BMW 3.0Si | 144 | 35 |
| 15 | 2001cc – 3000cc | 45 | Mayrack Manufacturers Pty Ltd | (Australia) Gary Cooke (Australia) Ben Penhall | Mazda RX-3 | 143 | 51 |
| 16 | 2001cc – 3000cc | 46 | Bill Shiells | (New Zealand) Bill Shiells (New Zealand) Frank Radisich | Mazda RX-3 | 142 | 58 |
| 17 | 3001cc – 6000cc | 30 | Scotty Taylor Holden | (Australia) Alan "Scotty" Taylor (Australia) Kevin Kennedy | Holden LH Torana SL/R 5000 L34 | 141 | 25 |
| 18 | 3001cc – 6000cc | 4 | John Goss Racing Pty Ltd | (Australia) Jack Brabham (Australia) Geoff Brabham | Ford XC Falcon GS500 Hardtop | 141 | 9 |
| 19 | Up to 2000cc | 51 | Kevin Fischer | (Australia) Eric Boord (Australia) Keith Poole | Ford Escort RS2000 Mk.II | 138 | 42 |
| 20 | Up to 2000cc | 55 | Terry Daly | (Australia) Terry Daly (Australia) Barry Jones | Ford Escort RS2000 Mk.II | 137 | 43 |
| 21 | Up to 2000cc | 63 | Robin Dudfield | (Australia) Robin Dudfield (Australia) Tony Niovanni | Alfa Romeo 2000 GTV | 131 | 56 |
| 22 | 2001cc – 3000cc | 32 | James Mason Motors Pty Ltd | (Australia) Lynn Brown (Australia) Bruce Stewart | Mazda RX-3 | 129 | 40 |
| DNF | 3001cc – 6000cc | 11 | Bob Forbes | (Australia) Bob Forbes (Australia) Kevin Bartlett | Holden LX Torana SS A9X Hatchback | 147 | 11 |
| DNF | 3001cc – 6000cc | 20 | Roadways/Gown Hindhaugh | (Australia) Garth Wigston (Australia) Bruce Hindhaugh | Holden LX Torana SS A9X Hatchback | 144 | 14 |
| DNF | 3001cc – 6000cc | 6 | Craven Mild Racing | (Australia) Allan Grice (Australia) Frank Gardner | Holden LX Torana SS A9X Hatchback | 140 | 4 |
| DNF | 3001cc – 6000cc | 13 | Bryan Byrt Ford | (Australia) Dick Johnson (Australia) Vern Schuppan | Ford XB Falcon GT Hardtop | 124 | 15 |
| DNF | 3001cc – 6000cc | 5 | John Goss Racing Pty Ltd | (Australia) John Goss (France) Henri Pescarolo | Ford XC Falcon GS500 Hardtop | 113 | 16 |
| DNF | 3001cc – 6000cc | 7 | Ron Hodgson Motors | (Australia) Bob Morris (United Kingdom) John Fitzpatrick | Holden LX Torana SL/R 5000 A9X 4-Door | 111 | 7 |
| DNF | Up to 2000cc | 56 | De Bortoli Wines | (Australia) Bruce Hodgson (Australia) Dave Morrow | Ford Escort RS2000 Mk.II | 107 | 52 |
| DNF | 3001cc – 6000cc | 24 | Bill Patterson Racing | (United Kingdom) Gerry Marshall (South Africa) Basil van Rooyen | Holden LX Torana SL/R 5000 A9X 4-Door | 107 | 18 |
| DNF | Up to 2000cc | 68 | Chevelle Motors Pty Ltd | (Australia) Phil Ward (Australia) Phil Lucas | BMW 2002 Tii | 106 | 55 |
| DNF | 2001cc – 3000cc | 42 | Craven Mild Racing | (Japan) Yoshimi Katayama (Australia) Geoff Leeds | Mazda RX-3 | 103 | 38 |
| NC | 3001cc – 6000cc | 23 | Rusty French | (Australia) Rusty French (New Zealand) Leo Leonard | Ford XC Falcon GS500 Hardtop | 99 | 17 |
| DNF | 2001cc – 3000cc | 34 | Amco Pty Ltd | (Australia) Russell Skaife (Australia) Sue Ransom | Ford Capri Mk.I | 98 | 36 |
| DNF | Up to 2000cc | 67 | Bob Glazier | (Australia) Peter Granger (Australia) Ian Richards | BMW 2002 Tii | 96 | 57 |
| DNF | 2001cc – 3000cc | 40 | ATP (Australia) Pty Ltd | (Australia) Alan Cant (Japan) Satoru Nakajima | Ford Capri Mk.I | 95 | 32 |
| DNF | 2001cc – 3000cc | 47 | Brian Wood Ford | (Australia) Ray Farrar (Australia) Geoff Wade | Ford Capri Mk.I | 93 | 60 |
| DNF | 3001cc – 6000cc | 14 | Holden Dealer Team | (Australia) John Harvey (Australia) Wayne Negus | Holden LX Torana SS A9X Hatchback | 91 | 8 |
| DNF | 3001cc – 6000cc | 19 | Ian Diffen | (Australia) Ian Diffen (New Zealand) Tim Slako | Holden LH Torana SL/R 5000 L34 | 90 | 19 |
| DNF | Up to 2000cc | 49 | Bob Holden Shell Sport | (Australia) Lyndon Arnel (Australia) Richard Carter | Ford Escort RS2000 Mk.II | 88 | 46 |
| DNF | Up to 2000cc | 50 | Bob Holden Shell Sport | (Australia) Bob Holden (Australia) Ian Messner | Ford Escort RS2000 Mk.II | 84 | 49 |
| NC | 3001cc – 6000cc | 28 | Henderson's Federal Spring Works | (Australia) Jim Keogh (Australia) Graham Ritter | Ford XB Falcon GT Hardtop | 82 | 20 |
| DNF | Up to 2000cc | 60 | Peter Williamson Pty Ltd | (Australia) Peter Williamson (Australia) Gary Scott | Toyota Celica | 76 | 34 |
| DNF | 2001cc – 3000cc | 41 | Warren Torr | (Australia) John Duggan (Australia) Brian Wheeler | Mazda RX-3 | 72 | 44 |
| DNF | Up to 2000cc | 62 | Gill Gordon Alfa | (Australia) Peter Hopwood (Australia) Warwick Henderson | Alfa Romeo Alfetta GTAm | 65 | 53 |
| DNF | Up to 2000cc | 53 | Lennox Motors | (Australia) Chris Heyer (West Germany) Rudi Dahlhauser | Volkswagen Golf GTi | 62 | 50 |
| DNF | 3001cc – 6000cc | 29 | Bond's Coats Patents | (Australia) Graham Ryan (Australia) Phillip Arnull | Holden LX Torana SL/R 5000 A9X 4-Door | 57 | 23 |
| DNF | 3001cc – 6000cc | 10 | Melford Motors | (New Zealand) Jim Richards (New Zealand) Rod Coppins | Ford XB Falcon GT Hardtop | 53 | 6 |
| DNF | Up to 2000cc | 54 | Nev Ham Pty Ltd | (Australia) Rod Morris (Australia) Paul Gulson | Ford Escort RS2000 Mk.II | 46 | 54 |
| DNF | 2001cc – 3000cc | 36 | Les Grose | (Australia) Bill Stanley (Australia) Les Grose | Ford Capri Mk.I | 46 | 33 |
| DNF | 2001cc – 3000cc | 37 | Lakis Manticas | (Australia) Graham Moore (Australia) Lakis Manticas | Ford Capri RS3100 Mk.I | 46 | 28 |
| DNF | 3001cc – 6000cc | 22 | Pioneer Electronics | (Australia) Warren Cullen (Australia) Brian Sampson | Holden LX Torana SS A9X Hatchback | 39 | 24 |
| DNF | 3001cc – 6000cc | 18 | Brian Wood Ford | (Australia) Murray Carter (Australia) Bob Stevens | Ford XC Falcon GS500 Hardtop | 38 | 12 |
| DNF | 3001cc – 6000cc | 3 | Bob Jane 2UW Racing | (Australia) Bob Jane (Australia) Ian Geoghegan | Holden LX Torana SS A9X Hatchback | 35 | 5 |
| DNF | 3001cc – 6000cc | 27 | Rod Donovan | (Australia) Rod Donovan (Australia) Ron Lindau | Ford XB Falcon GT Hardtop | 31 | 29 |
| DNF | 3001cc – 6000cc | 17 | Ron Hodgson Motors | (United States) Johnny Rutherford (United States) Janet Guthrie | Holden LX Torana SS A9X Hatchback | 13 | 26 |
| DNF | Up to 2000cc | 65 | Ken Mathews Rose Bay | (Australia) James Laing-Peach (Australia) Bill Evans | Triumph Dolomite Sprint | 12 | 39 |
| DNF | Up to 2000cc | 73 | Barry Sheales Holden | (Australia) Allan Gough (Australia) Kel Gough | Holden Gemini | 7 | 59 |
| DNF | 2001cc – 3000cc | 39 | Lawrie Nelson | (Australia) Lawrie Nelson (Australia) Brian Reed | Ford Capri Mk.I | 6 | 30 |
| DSQ | 2001cc – 3000cc | 46 | Terry Shiel | (Australia) Terry Shiel (Australia) Don Holland | Mazda RX-3 | 152 | 31 |
| DNQ | Up to 2000cc | 57 | Fred's Treads Pty Ltd | (Australia) Gordon Rich (Australia) Ron Gillard | Alfa Romeo 2000 GTV | | |

== Statistics ==
- Pole position - #25 Peter Brock - 2:24.1
- Fastest lap - #1 Allan Moffat - 2:26.4 (lap record)
- Race time of winning car - 6:59:07.8
- Average speed of winning car- 144 km/h (89 mph)
