= Ford Falcon Cobra =

Ford XC Falcon Cobra
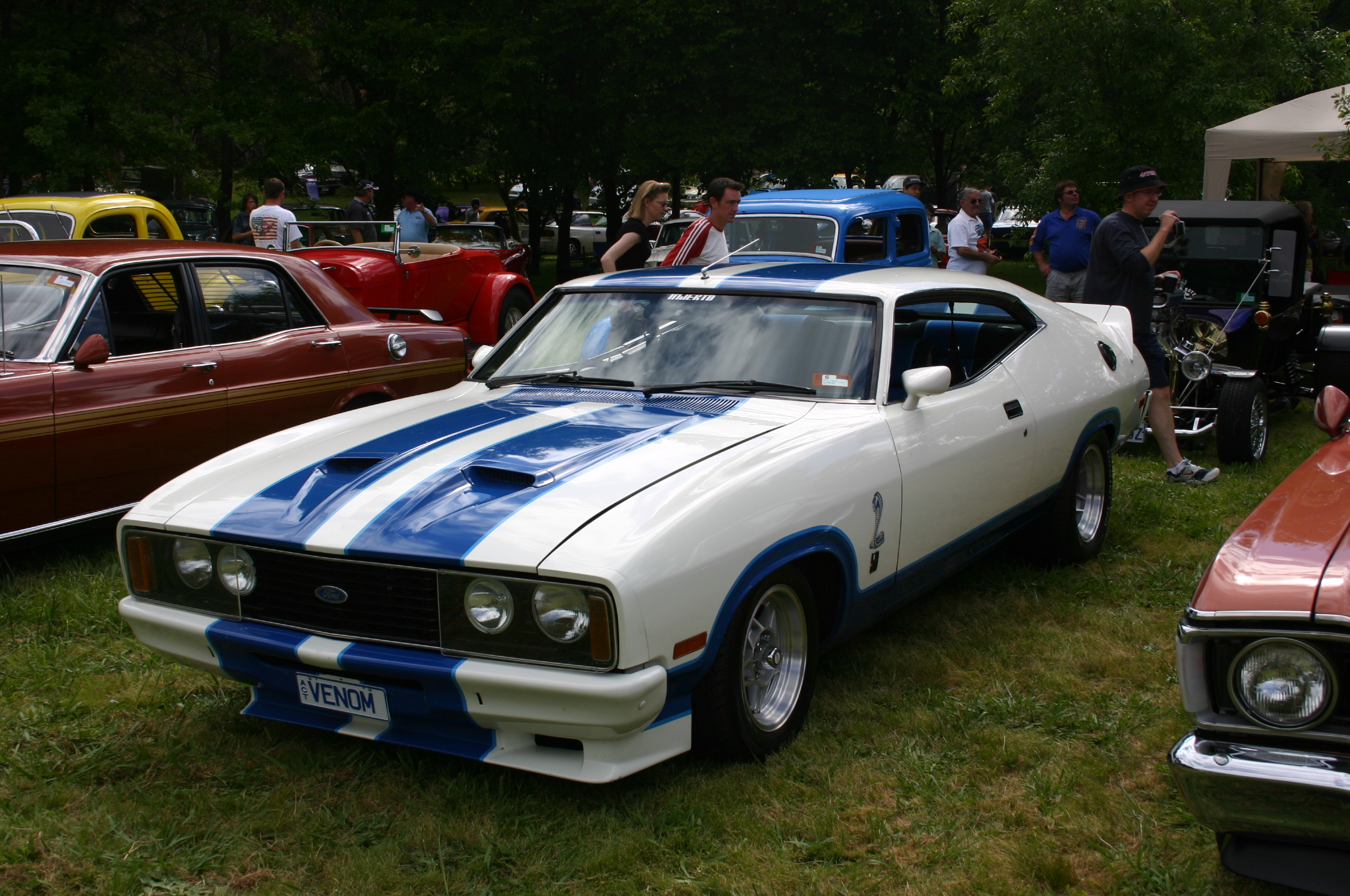

Overview
- Manufacturer: Ford Australia
- Production: 1978
- Assembly: Australia: Melbourne, Victoria (Broadmeadows)

Body and chassis
- Class: Muscle car
- Body style: 2-door Hardtop
- Platform: FR

Chronology
- Successor: None

The Ford Falcon Cobra, released by Ford Australia in 1978, was a limited-edition version of the Ford Falcon XC Hardtop.

== History ==
In 1978, Ford Australia unveiled plans for an all-new Falcon, dubbed the XD, that would be released in 1979. Unlike the current XC, the new model would be offered only as a four-door sedan or station wagon, meaning the two-door XC Hardtops of 1978 would be the last of that design.

In December 1977 Ford built 13 special order XC Falcon GS Hardtops with VINs beginning JG65TE. These cars were specially modified in the P&A (Parts and Accessories) workshop at Ford's Campbellfield factory. All vehicles were modified to accord with 'evolution' upgrades that had been approved by CAMS for homologation to Australian Group C touring car racing Falcons ... the changes were mostly designed to enhance race durability; these vehicles, often referred to as "Pre-Cobras", were intended to be raced by teams at Bathurst in 1977. The homologation modifications included rear wheel wells that were deepened inboard by 1 inch to accommodate larger racing wheels and tyres, a reverse bonnet scoop to allow the race car engines to draw cool air from the base of the windscreen, twin electric fans that were switchable from the dash (replacing the single engine-driven fan), a front shocker tower brace ("K brace") that stiffened the front end, an idler arm brace, and an aero package including a rear "blade" spoiler (similar to that used on the 2-door Holden Torana A9X) and a front air dam. The 13 cars were available in standard body and interior colours and retained the side trim strips, dummy rear brake scoops and unpainted chrome bumpers of the standard GS hardtops. The race cars did complete the 1977 Endurance Series in their new specification and then participated in the 1978 ATCC season.

The modifications that featured in these 13 GS Hardtops formed the basis of the specification for the 30 specific Option 97 Cobra Hardtops built in 1978, although there were minor differences as the Option 97 cars also incorporated further evolution parts such as reinforced fan brackets and a deeper front spoiler. In addition the Option 97 cars received a black corduroy seat material and Scheel front seats to differentiate them from the Option 96 Cobras.

When final production of the XC Hardtop at the Broadmeadows Assembly Plant was ending in March 1978, more than 400 body shells were left unsold and Ford Australia faced a dilemma of how to shift them, rather than scrap them. When an original proposal to turn these cars into black and gold Playboy-themed cars (complete with "bunny" decals) was rejected as sending the wrong image for a family car company, Ford turned to Edsel Ford II, then the Deputy Managing Director of Ford Motor Company who was also M.D. of Ford Australia at that time (from 1978 to 1980). He and a local design team elected to capitalise on Allan Moffat and Colin Bond's crushing 1-2 finish at the 1977 Bathurst 1000 by creating a road car with a "Shelby Mustang" look that could be homologated for racing, while at the same time offering enthusiasts the opportunity to own a street-legal version of Moffat's race car. The first prototype Falcon Cobra was built in late April 1978 and production began that same July.

The cars were painted Bold Blue with an overlay of Sno White, with Olympic Blue accent stripes separating the two colours ... "Cobra" emblem decals, a throwback to Carroll Shelby's Mustangs of the 1960s, were affixed to the front fenders, along with a name decal at the rear. Unusually, the bodyshells were painted blue first, the intended area of blue stripes and sills then masked and the white coat painted over the top. Each of the cars was given its own individual serial number and fitted with a sequentially numbered plaque (from 001 to 400) on the dash. The first 200 Cobras produced were given the 5.8L 351 Cleveland V8, while the other 200 received the 4.9L 302 Cleveland ... the only exceptions to this being build number 351, which is a 351ci (5.8 litre) V8. (For many years it was believed #001 was built as a 302, however research has proven to show it was in fact a 351, opt 96 spec with full options, inc power windows, air con and power steering)

Cobras were available with either automatic or manual transmission. Standard equipment included four-wheel disc brakes, limited slip differential, 15-inch Bathurst Globe wheels, front & rear spoilers and dual exhaust. The interiors were uniformly black, with Cobra specific cloth seat inserts in black with blue stripes that match those on the outside body. Cars numbered from 002 to 0031 were known as Option 97 specification, the so-called "Bathurst Cobras", fitted with parts to allow homologation for racing, including twin radiator fans switchable from the dash, a gearbox oil cooler, suspension bracing and reworked rear wheel body housings. They were most easily identified from the other 370 Option 96 Cobras via their large (and functional) rear-opening bonnet scoop. Allan Moffat's "Moffat Ford Dealers" race cars of late 1978 shared the same body paint decoration as the road cars.

Falcon Cobras have become increasingly revered by collectors across Australia and a mint example might be worth upwards of $100,000 ... with Option 97 cars (rarely offered up for sale) likely to fetch a further premium.

Cobra 400, the last numbered Falcon Cobra off the production line, was bought in 1985 by Damien Lowry for $10,990 and used as a daily driver. In 1985 the car was disassembled for restoration following a traffic accident. The car remained that way, in boxes in Damien's garage, until February 2017 when he took it to Astill Design to be restored. Damien worked closely with Howard Astill for almost two years to restore the car to its original condition. In January 2019, Falcon Cobra 400 won the “Top Authentic” class in the Elite Division at Summernats in Canberra, and was featured in the April 2, 2020 edition of Unique Cars magazine. The car was subsequently sold for an undisclosed sum. It can be distinguished by the incorrect sill stripe, which follows the sloping body crease instead of being parallel to the ground.

== FPV GT Cobra ==
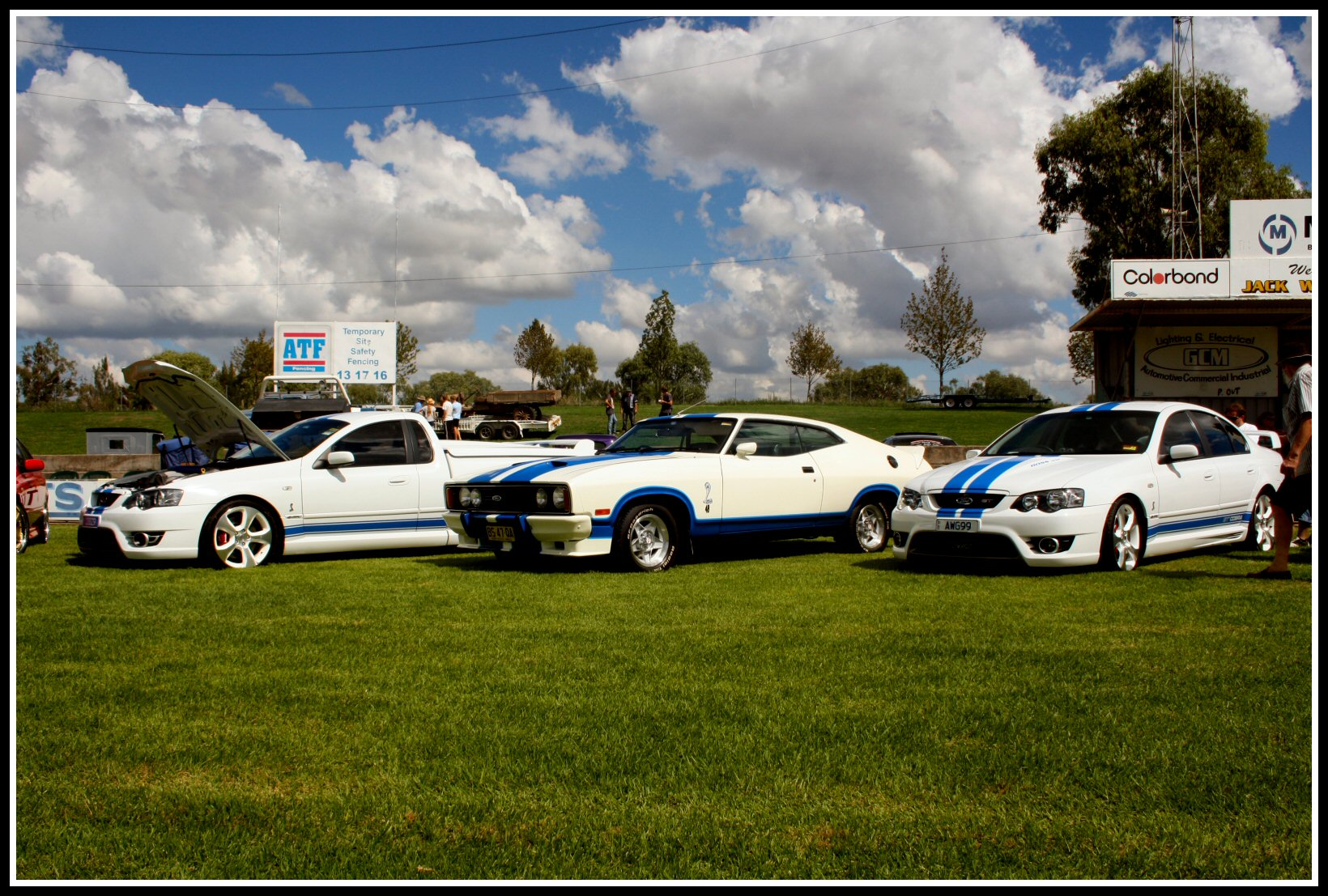
BF Falcon GT Cobra, XC Cobra Hardtop and BF Cobra ute.

The FPV GT Cobra was released in 2007, powered by a 5.4-litre Boss 302 at 302 kW (405 hp), 400 sedans and 100 Utes were produced.

It was unveiled at the 2007 Bathurst 1000, Ford Performance Vehicles, celebrating 30 years since Moffat and Bond's 1-2 finish.
