= Disappearance of Allan Bryant =

2013 missing person case

- Disappeared: 3 November 2013 (aged 23); Glenrothes, Fife, Scotland
- Status: Missing for 13 years and 10 days
- Height: 5 ft 6 in (168 cm)

On 3 November 2013, Allan Bryant, a 23-year-old man from Glenrothes, Fife, Scotland, disappeared after leaving Styx nightclub following a night out with friends. He was last seen on CCTV leaving the nightclub at 2:02 am and has not been seen or heard from since. Despite extensive searches and subsequent inquiries, police have found no evidence of criminality and continue to treat his disappearance as a missing person inquiry. His family believe that he was murdered.

== Background ==
Allan Bryant was 23 years old and lived with his parents, Allan Bryant Snr and Marie Degan, and his two younger sisters in Glenrothes, Fife, Scotland. He was a Celtic supporter and had spoken about attending college. His father described him as "full of carry on" and said he often teased his friends and played pranks on them and his sisters.

Bryant's last sighting on CCTV leaving Styx nightclub at 2:02 am

== Disappearance ==
On 2 November 2013, Bryant left his home in Ednam Drive, Glenrothes, at around 8:30 pm and walked with friends to an engagement party at Leslie Golf Club, where he arrived at around 9 pm. Bryant was last seen on CCTV leaving Styx at 2:02 am on 3 November. He then exchanged a few words with a door steward before heading towards his home, which was about one mile from the nightclub. He did not return home and has not been seen or heard from since.

== Investigation ==
Bryant's family contacted police on 5 November 2013. Police Scotland subsequently carried out searches of the River Leven, ponds, wells, quarries and woodland. His family also hired a pilot to take aerial photographs of the area from a Cessna aircraft, which his father later examined. Police said that information received from the public had been investigated, including suggestions that Bryant had been harmed, but that there was no evidence of criminality and his disappearance remained a missing person inquiry. His family believed that he had been murdered. His father said that information received over the years led the family to believe that Bryant attended a house party after leaving the nightclub and was murdered there.

In August 2014, a man was jailed for ten months after harassing Bryant's family and falsely stating that he had abducted and murdered Bryant.

In 2015, searches were conducted at several locations. In January, Bryant's family used a specially trained search dog to search waterways and reservoirs near the Lomond Hills. In April, his family and volunteers searched woodland near Auchtermuchty following reports of a possible sighting and suggestions that he may have attended an outdoor rave there on the night he disappeared. A drain in Glenrothes was searched in September. In April 2016, police conducted a three-day search of woodland near Anstruther. A property in Barnton Place, Glenrothes, was searched for a month in 2017, and police divers searched part of the River Leven in July 2018. None of these searches found any trace of Bryant.

In 2018, the man who had previously harassed Bryant's family was sentenced to a further eight months in prison after again sending them abusive messages.

In 2020, human remains were discovered at an abandoned industrial unit in Glenrothes. Bryant's family initially thought the remains might be his, but they were identified as those of 66-year-old Ean Coutts, who had been murdered the previous year.

In April 2024, an anonymous letter sent to a friend of the family purported to contain information about Bryant's remains and referred to locations where they might be found. Police reportedly found no DNA or fingerprints on the letter, and Bryant's father said he did not believe its contents were genuine. Police also conducted a four-day search of Auchtermuchty Common. Bryant's family carried out a further search of the area later that year. Nothing found during either search was linked to Bryant. Police also visited a farm near Glenrothes after receiving information concerning Bryant, which they later determined was not credible.
