= Terry Daly =

Irish footballer (born 1953)

Personal information
- Date of birth: 7 July 1953 (age 73)
- Place of birth: Dublin, Ireland

Youth career
- 1970–1975: Shamrock Rovers

Senior career*
Years	Team	Apps	(Gls)
1975–1979	Athlone Town		
1977	St. Louis Stars	19	(2)
1979–1980	Dundalk	41	(7)
1980–1981	Drogheda United		
1981–1984	Shelbourne		
1984–1986	Home Farm		
1986–1987	Drogheda United		
- * Club domestic league appearances and goals

Terry Daly (born 7 July 1953) is an Irish former association football player who played as a midfielder.

== Career ==
Daly was part of the Athlone Town side that played AC Milan in the 1975–76 UEFA Cup and was a key member of that team. Having finished in 2nd place the previous season, Athlone earned a place in the 1975-76 UEFA Cup, the first time they had ever qualified for European competition. Their first-round game was against Norwegian side Vålerenga who they beat 4–2 on aggregate with Daly playing in both games. In the second-round, Athlone were drawn against Italian giants AC Milan drawing 0–0 in the first leg at St. Mel's Park setting a record attendance of 9,000 before losing the second leg at the San Siro 3–0. Daly would start both games for Athlone. During the summer of 1977, he was part of the roster of the North American Soccer League (NASL) team the St Louis Stars, wearing the number 7 shirt. In that era, with footballers often struggling to make ends meet, it was fairly commonplace for English and Irish-based players to spend the summer months playing in North America to earn extra cash. Daly played one season with the Stars in the 1977 NASL season, making 19 appearances and registering two goals and one assist. The Stars would finish second in the Northern Division before losing to the Rochester Lancers in the playoffs.

He departed Athlone for Dundalk in the summer of 1979, making his debut in a 1–0 win over Northern Irish side Glenavon on 2 August in the Tyler Cup. He was at Oriel Park for just one season, moving on to county rivals Drogheda United the following summer where he also spent one season.

Daly was on the move again one year later when he signed for Shelbourne ahead of the 1981–82 season and after three years with the Reds he joined Home Farm in the summer of 1984. Two more years followed with Farm before Daly rounded off his League of Ireland career with one final season at Drogheda United in 1986–87.
