= Ford Falcon (XC) =

Australian full-size car

Ford Falcon (XC) Ford Fairmont (XC)
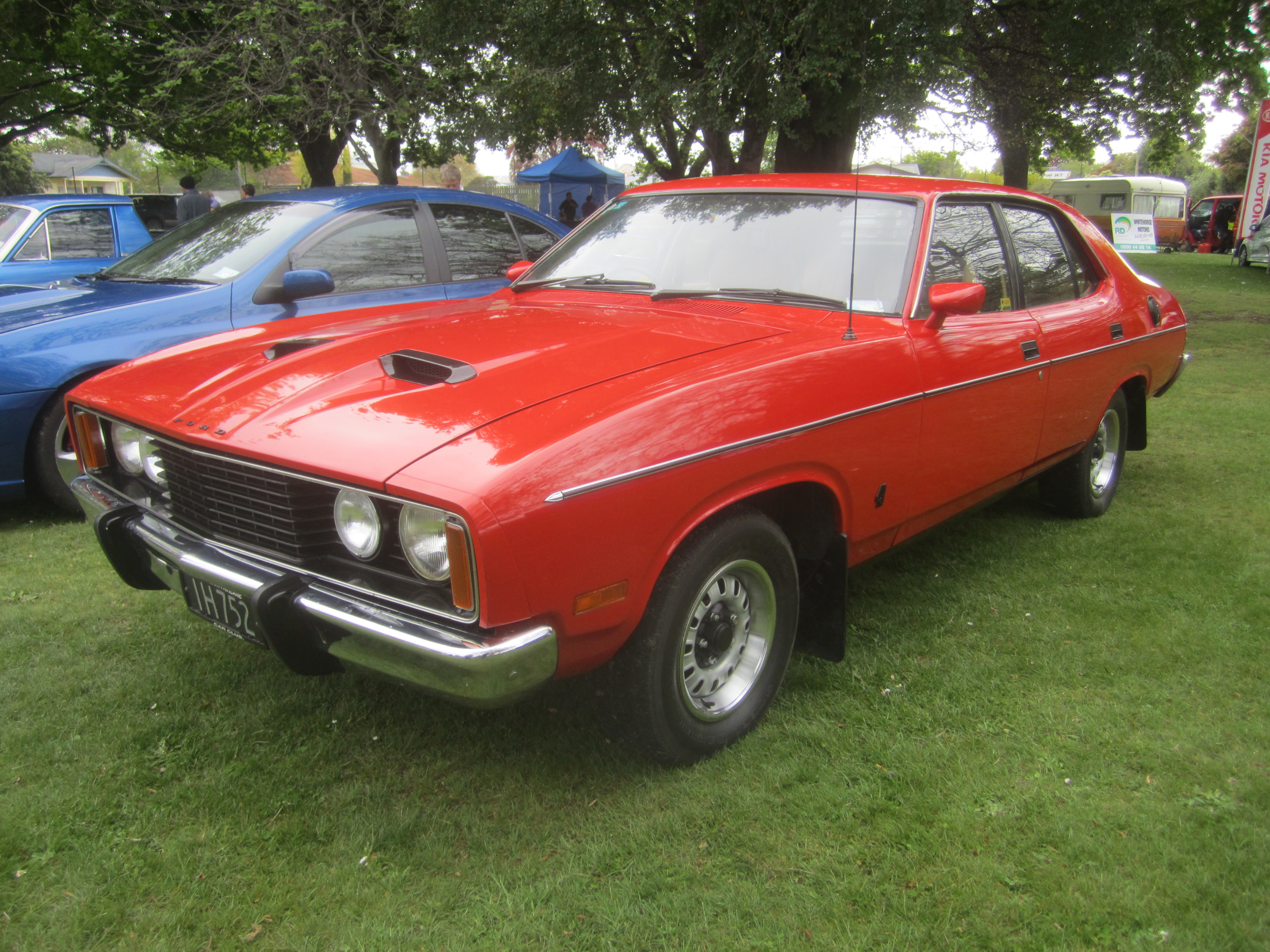
- Ford Falcon 500 Sedan (XC) with GS Rally Pack

Overview
- Manufacturer: Ford Australia
- Production: July 1976 – March 1979

Body and chassis
- Class: Full-size car
- Body style: 4-door Sedan; 4-door Station Wagon; 2-door Hardtop; 2-door Coupé utility 2-door Panel van

Powertrain
- Engine: 3.3 L Inline 6; 4.1 L Inline 6; 4.9 L Cleveland V8; 5.8 L Cleveland V8
- Transmission: 3spd manual 4spd manual 3spd auto

Dimensions
- Wheelbase: 2,819 mm (111.0 in)
- Length: 4,866 mm (191.6 in)
- Width: 1,900 mm (74.8 in)
- Height: 1,369 mm (53.9 in)
- Kerb weight: 1,475 kg (3,251.8 lb)

Chronology
- Predecessor: XB Falcon
- Successor: XD Falcon

The Ford Falcon (XC) is a full-size car that was produced by Ford Australia from 1976 to 1979. It was the third and last iteration of the third generation of the Falcon and also included the Ford Fairmont (XC)—the luxury-oriented version of the Falcon. In 1977, the Ford Falcon became Australia's top-selling car for the first time.

== Overview ==
The XC series was a facelift of the XB Falcon, itself an upgrade of the XA Falcon which had entered production in 1972.

Introduced in July 1976, the XC included significant changes to comply with new Australian Design Rules. ADR27A set limits for the emissions of hydrocarbons, carbon monoxide, and oxides of nitrogen. To meet the new requirements, engine compression ratios were dropped, and the engines now featured an exhaust gas recirculation valve and positive crankcase ventilation. In order to offset power losses as a result of implementing emissions controls, Ford invested $16 million upgrading the six-cylinder engines with extensive changes that included a new crossflow cylinder head with larger valves, and fitted all V8 engines with four-barrel carburettors. While quoted power outputs were lower than those claimed for the XB Falcon, this reflected a move from SAE gross to DIN methodology, which measured power of the engine as installed in the car with cooling, charging and exhaust systems installed. Ford claimed power outputs for the upgraded engines were around ten per cent higher than those of their XB predecessors.

Weight also increased significantly, from 1,385 to 1,478 kilograms (3,053 to 3,258 lb). The increase was in part due to the fitting of much larger, stronger front and rear bumpers, and strengthening of the doors to comply with ADR29, which introduced strength and stiffness requirements for side-impact protection.

Visually, the XC Falcon was given a restyle treatment that softened its appearance from its predecessors. The XC had a less aggressive nose which incorporated two round headlights on Falcon models and two rectangular headlights on Fairmont models. On sedan and wagon models, Ford also addressed the vision problems of the XA and XB by utilising redesigned rear doors, which debuted in May 1976 with the ZH series Fairlane, with a lower window line that had the effect of removing the coke bottle styling of the XA and XB. Visibility was further improved by an all-new, lower dashboard and crash pad, and higher front seats. The XC hardtop was the last of the two-door Australian Falcons.

The XC enjoyed sales success, overtaking the long-standing market-leader the Holden Kingswood to become Australia's top selling car for the first time. In September 1976, it outsold the Kingswood in monthly sales by a margin of 4.8 per cent. Then, in 1977, its annual sales surpassed those of the Kingswood by a narrow margin, 54,506 units to 53,934. The release of the much improved HZ series Kingswood in December 1977 saw that model reclaim sales leadership in 1978 with 52,559 units for the Kingswood to 50,350 for the Falcon, with the successful launch of the acclaimed VB series Holden Commodore in October of that year putting further pressure on sales of the XC Falcon in its final months in production. In November 1978, the Falcon briefly regained the top spot in the sales chart as Kingswood sales dipped in the face of buyers switching to the new Commodore, which went on to achieve market leadership from December onwards.

Total production of the XC range reached 171,082 vehicles prior to its replacement by the XD Falcon in March 1979.

== Model range ==
The XC Falcon range of passenger vehicles consisted of nine models:

Model	Body	3.3	4.1	4.9	5.8
Falcon	Sedan	●	●	●	●
Falcon	Wagon	●	●	●	●
Falcon 500	Sedan	●	●	●	●
Falcon 500	Wagon	●	●	●	●
Falcon GS	Hardtop	−	●	●	●
Fairmont	Sedan	−	●	●	●
Fairmont	Wagon	−	●	●	●
Fairmont (GS)	Hardtop	−	●	●	●
Fairmont GXL	Sedan	−	●	●	●

The Fairmont models were not badged or marketed as Falcons.

The XC Falcon range of commercial vehicles consisted of five models:

Model	Body	3.3	4.1	4.9	5.8
Falcon	Utility	●	●	●	●
Falcon	Van	●	●	●	●
Falcon 500	Utility	●	●	●	●
Falcon 500	Van	●	●	●	●
Falcon Sundowner	Van	−	●	●	●

The contemporary Fairlane and LTD models were codenamed ZH, and P6 respectively.

Model	Body	3.3	4.1	4.9	5.8
ZH Fairlane 500	Sedan LWB	−	−	●	●
ZH Fairlane Marquis	Sedan LWB	−	−	●	●
P6 LTD	Sedan XLWB	−	−	−	●
P6 LTD Silver Monarch	Sedan XLWB	−	−	−	●

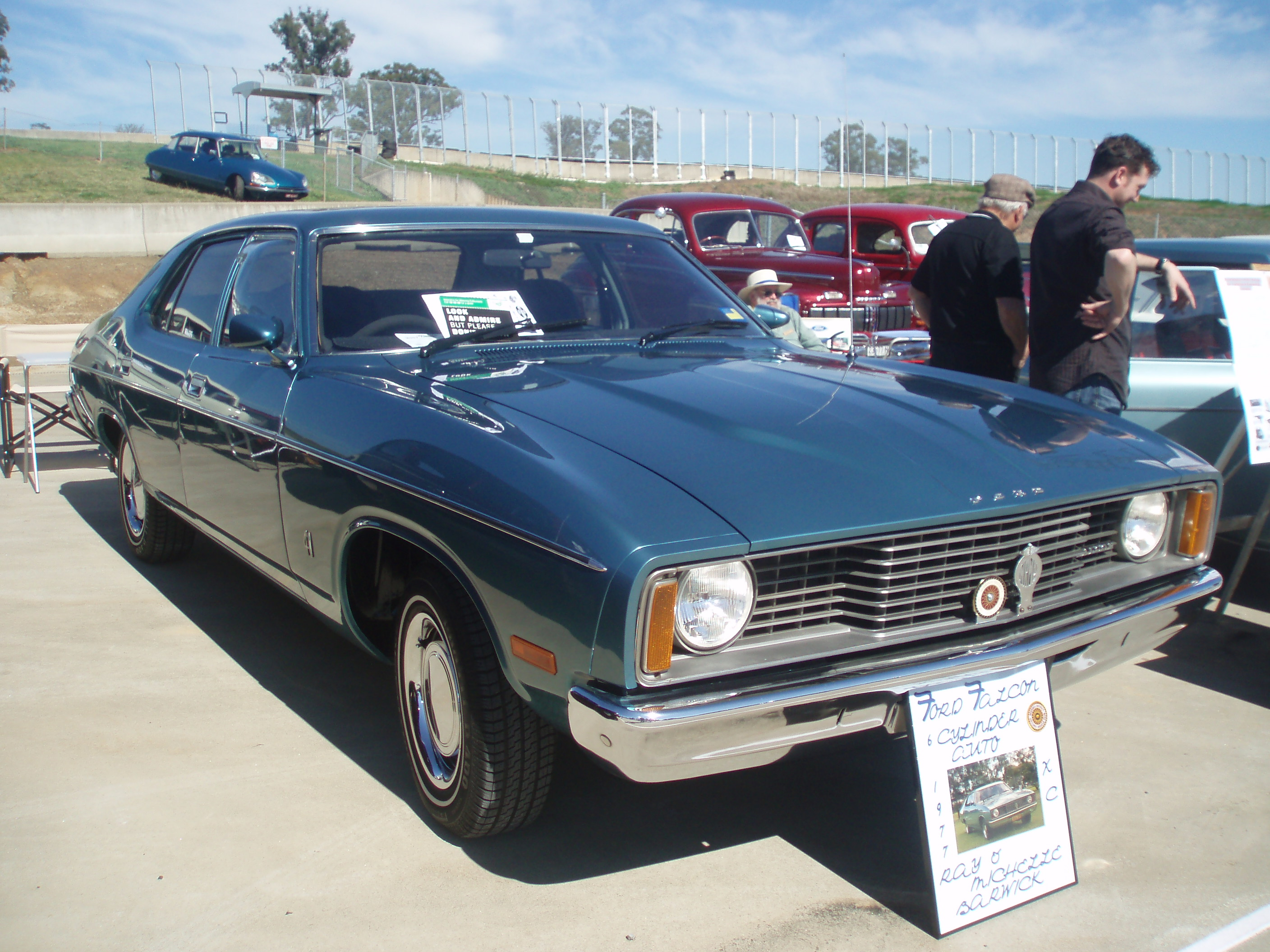
Ford Falcon 500 Sedan (XC)

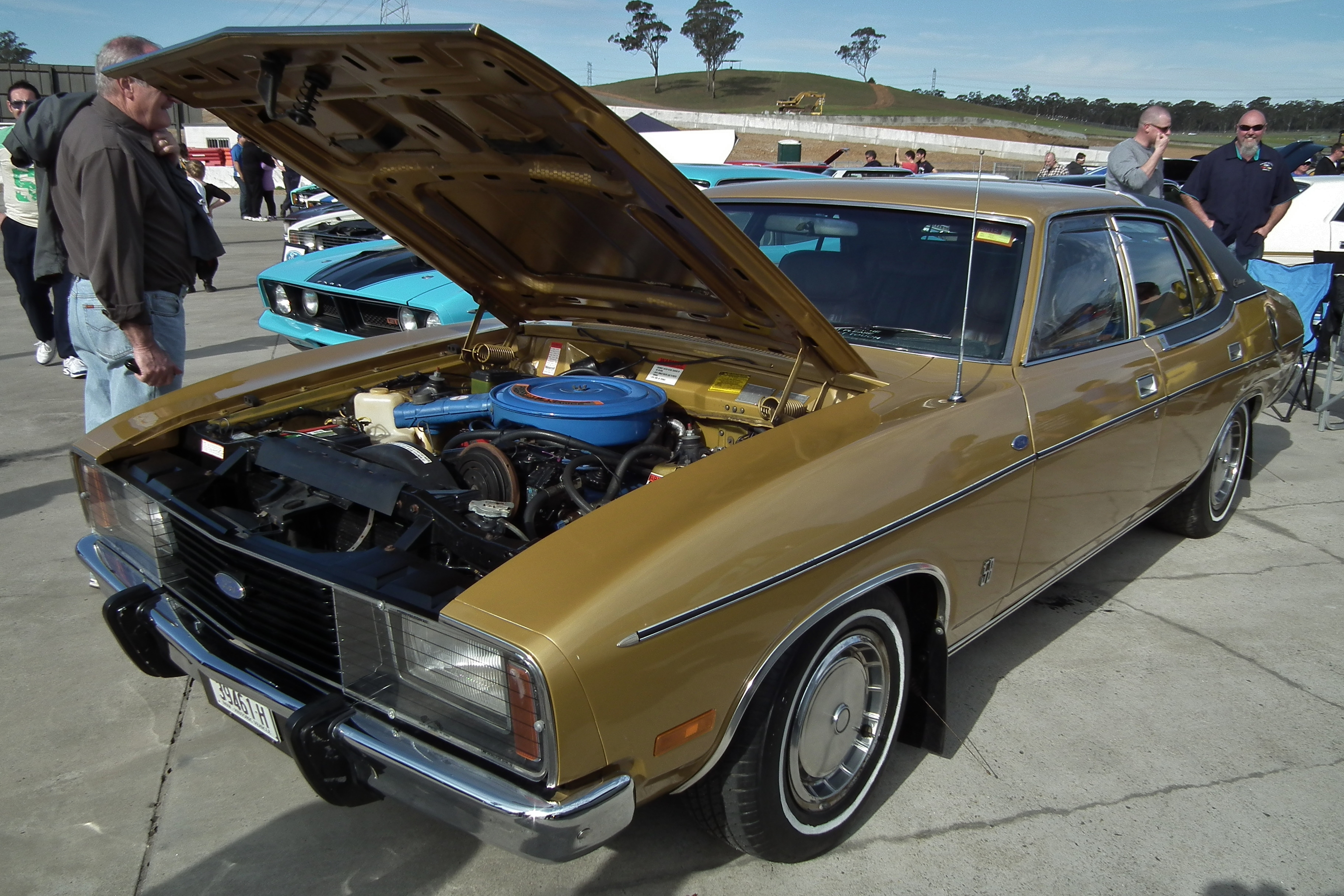
Ford Fairmont Sedan (XC)

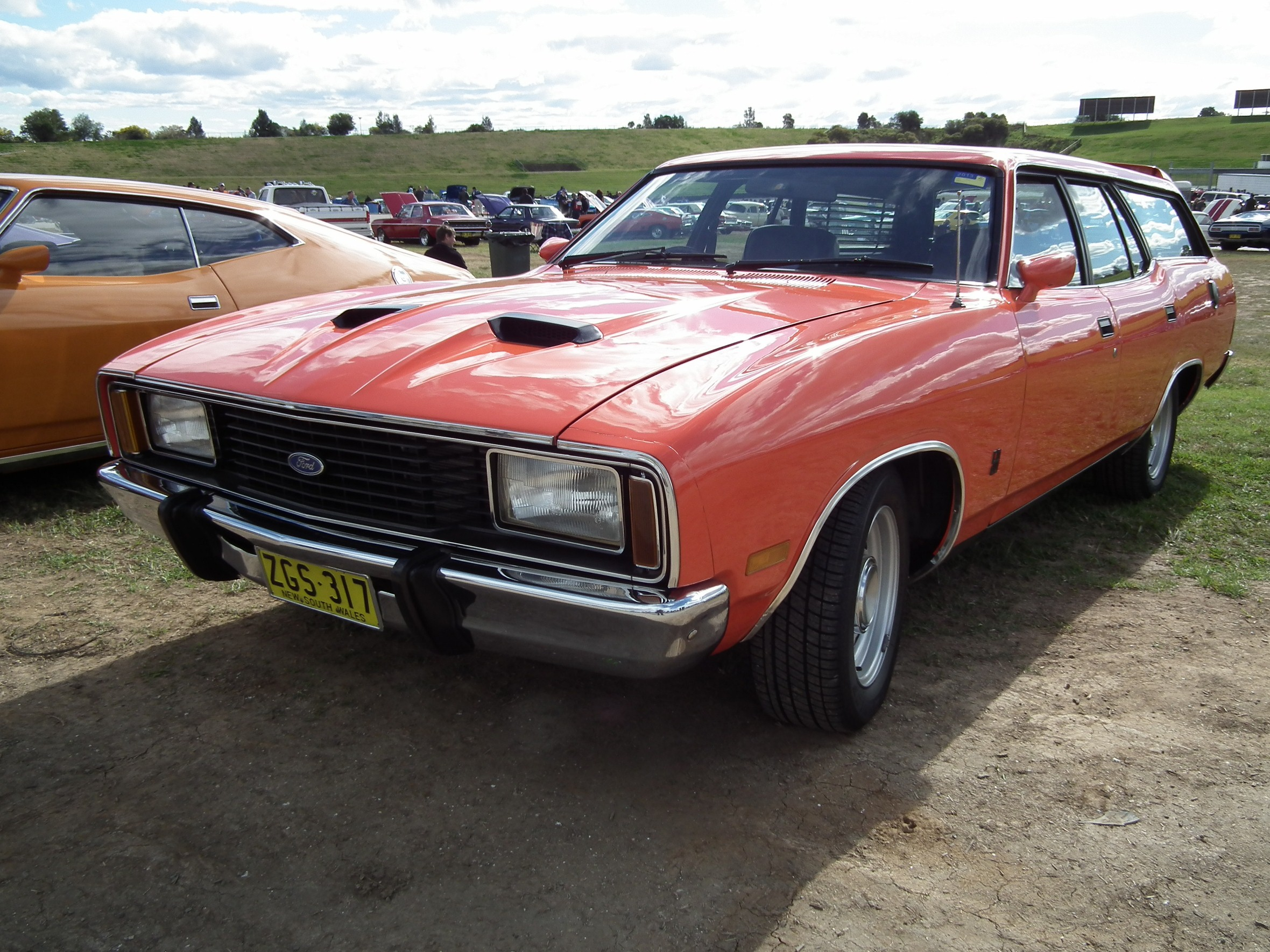
Ford Fairmont Wagon (XC) (with GS Rally Pack)

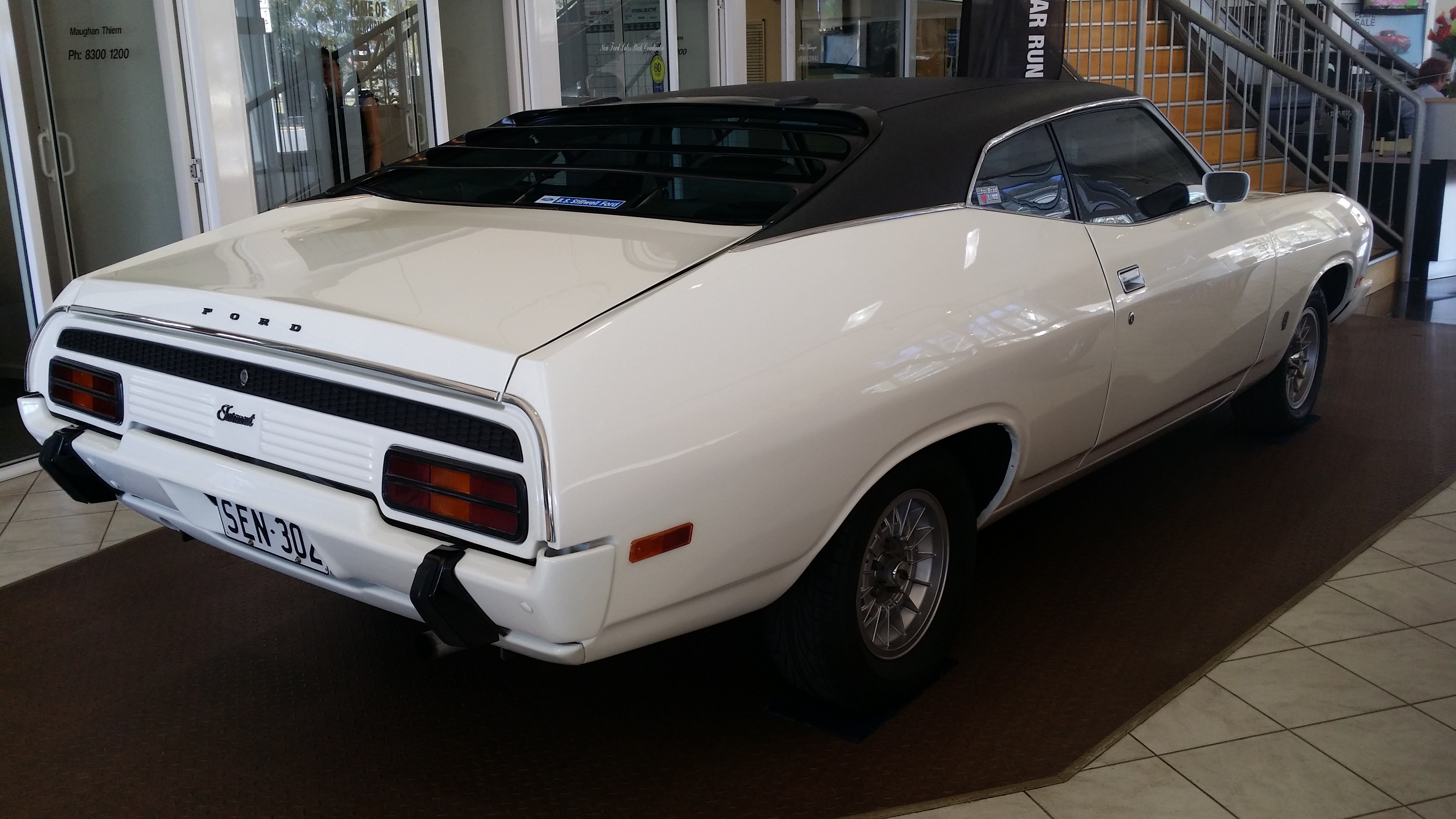
Ford Fairmont Hardtop (XC) (with optional vinyl roof)

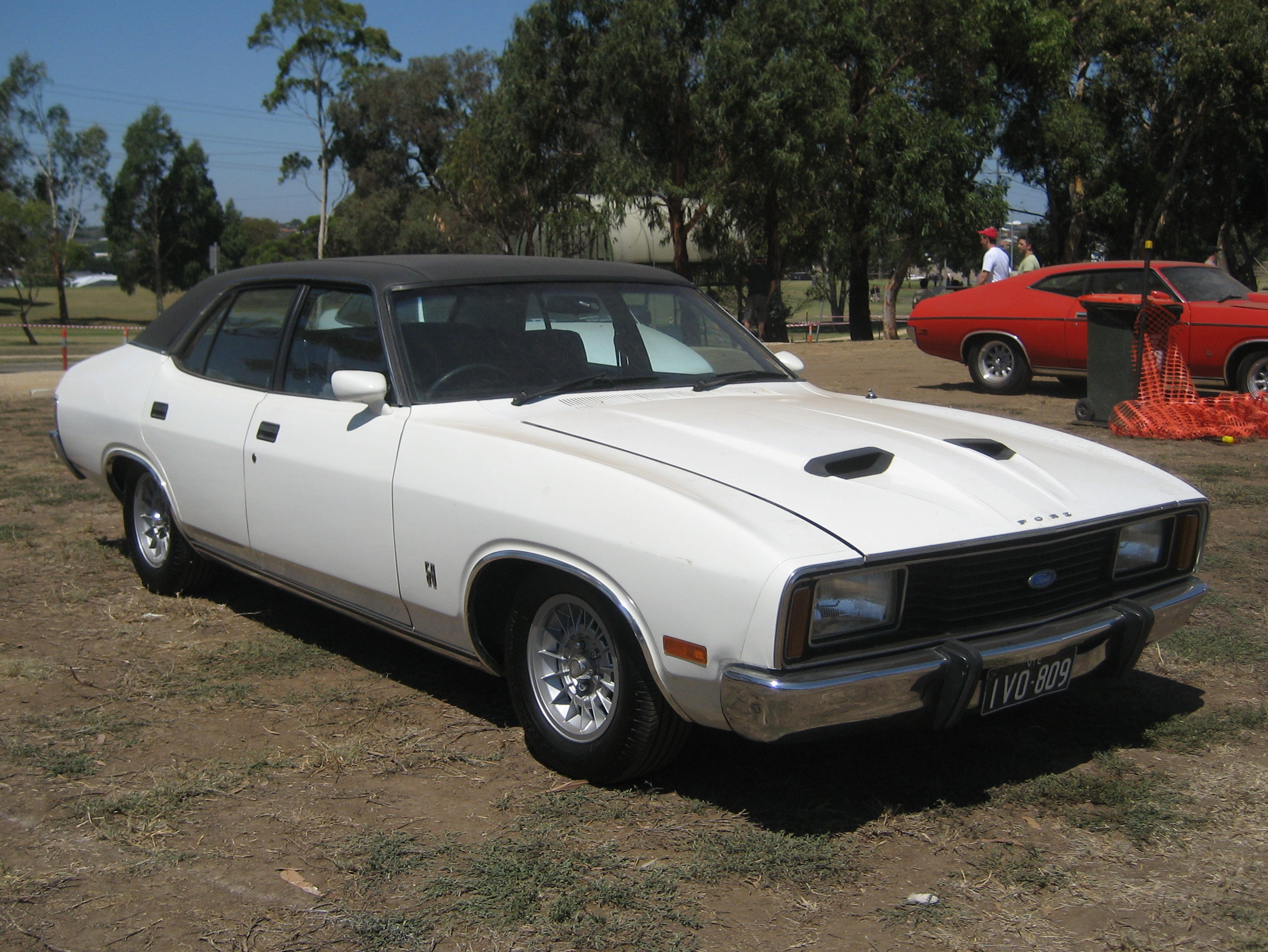
Ford Fairmont GXL (XC) (with optional vinyl roof)

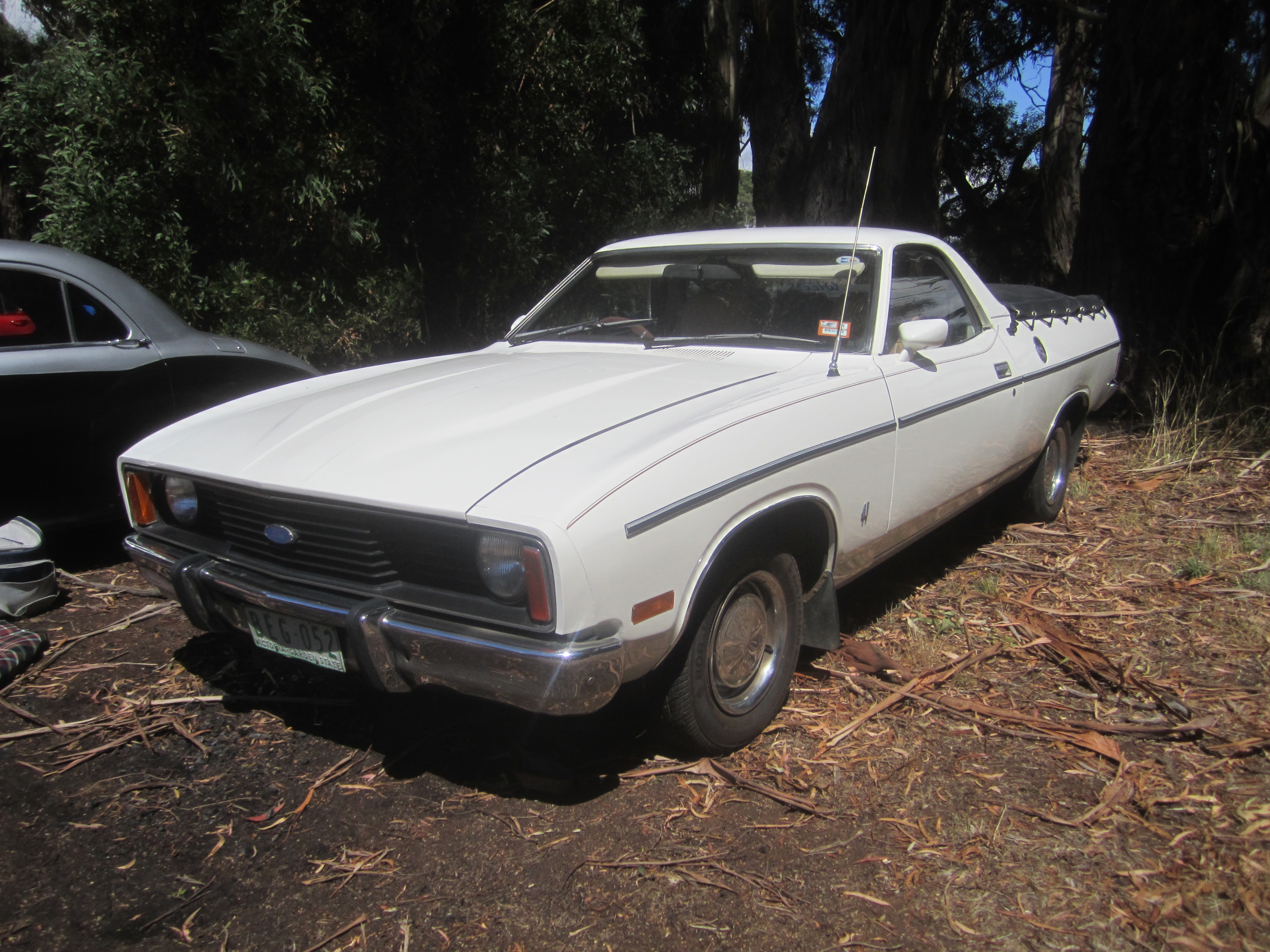
Ford Falcon Utility (XC)

Fairmont GXL

Unique to the XC model was the GXL version of the Fairmont, Available in 4.1L Straight 6, or 4.9L Cleveland V8. An upgraded engine package, the GT Power Pack, used the larger 5.8L Cleveland v8. The Fairmont GXL was replaced in the following XD range with the Fairmont Ghia model.

GS Rally Pack

A GS Rally Pack was fitted as standard equipment on the Falcon GS Hardtop and was available as an option on Falcon 500 Sedan and Wagon, Fairmont Sedan and Wagon, Falcon Utility and Van and on Falcon 500 Utility and Van. The pack included special paint treatment, bonnet scoops, bumper overriders, slotted steel wheels, enhanced instrumentation, a sports steering wheel and long range driving lights. The driving lights were not included when the pack was fitted to Fairmont models.

=== Limited edition models ===
In December 1977, 12 special-build XC hardtops were released, all with VINs beginning JG65TE. These were based on the GS hardtop but featured an homologation pack of additional parts that Ford persuaded CAMS was now available as standard on GS hardtops, in order to include those parts on their race cars. The pack included front and rear spoilers, twin electric radiator fans, various body and steering braces for durability and stiffness, and a reverse bonnet scoop that supplied cool air to the engine via a circular hole in the bonnet. This homologation pack would also form the basis of the 30 Option 97 "Bathurst Cobras" the following year.

Ford Falcon Cobra

In August 1978, Ford Australia introduced the limited production Falcon Cobra, a high-performance version of the XC Falcon Hardtop. Only 400 were built, including 4.9-litre and 5.8-litre street versions and 30 "Bathurst Specials".

Allan Moffat Special

In 1977, a limited number (500) of the Falcon 500 sedan were marketed as Allan Moffat Specials. These cars received XB GT-style blackouts and a sticker on the front doors consisting of Allan Moffat's signature and an Australian flag, as well as other options such as the GS Rally pack and Sports handling suspension as standard.

Sundowner Van

The Falcon Sundowner Van, based on the Falcon 500 Van, was introduced in 1977. It included options from the Falcon GS Hardtop, such as comprehensive instrumentation, bonnet scoops, slotted sports road wheels and driving lights, with side protection moulding's and rear side glass deleted. Side and rear decals were included in the package.

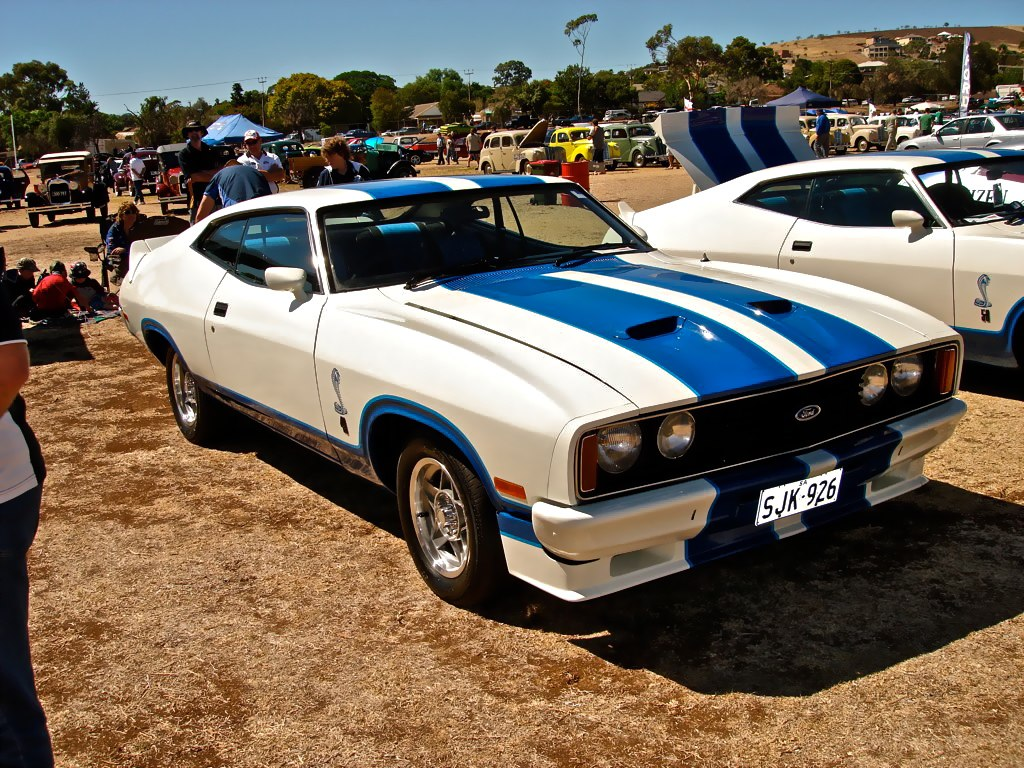
Ford Falcon Cobra (XC)

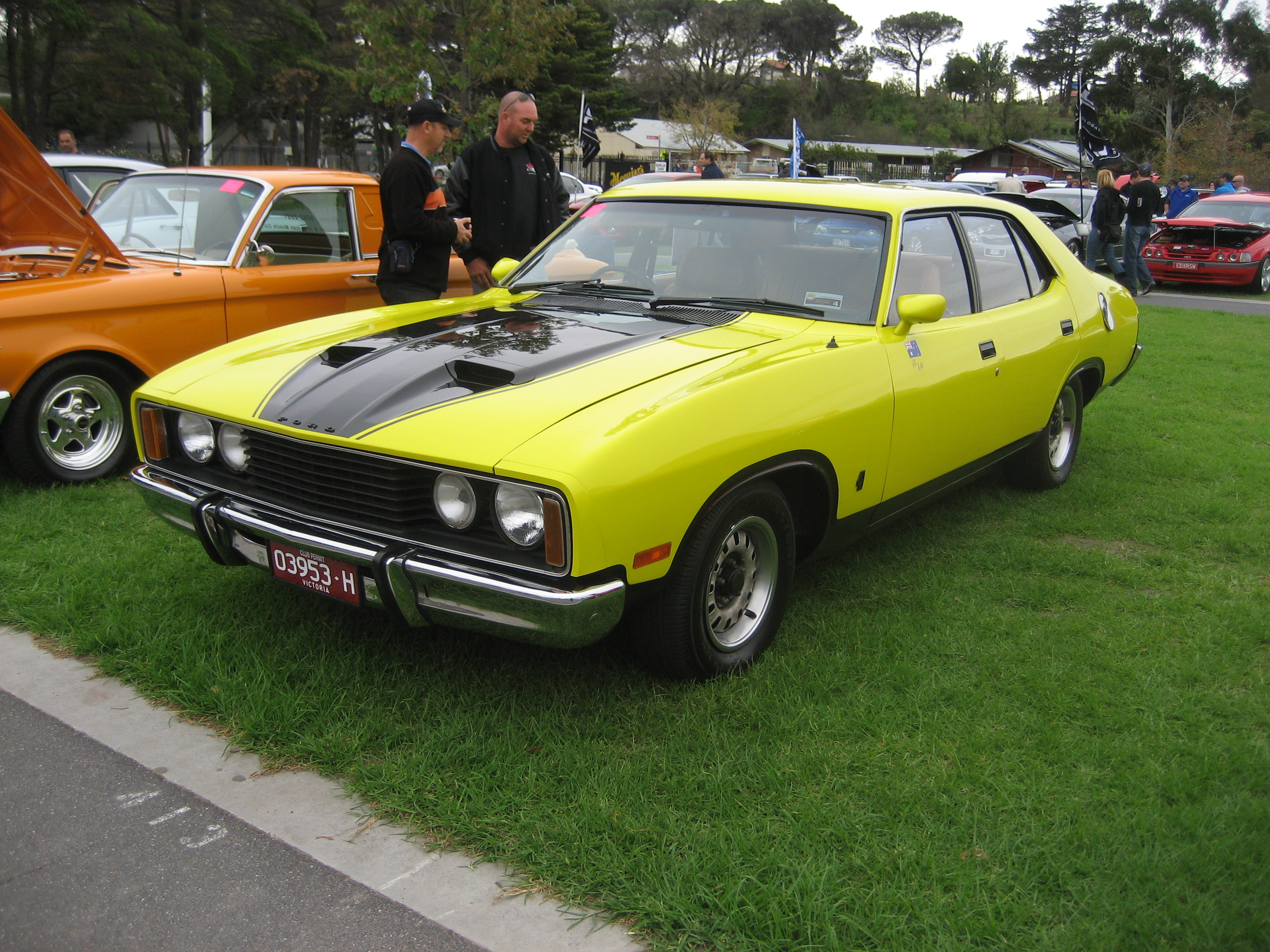
Ford Falcon Allan Moffat Special (XC)

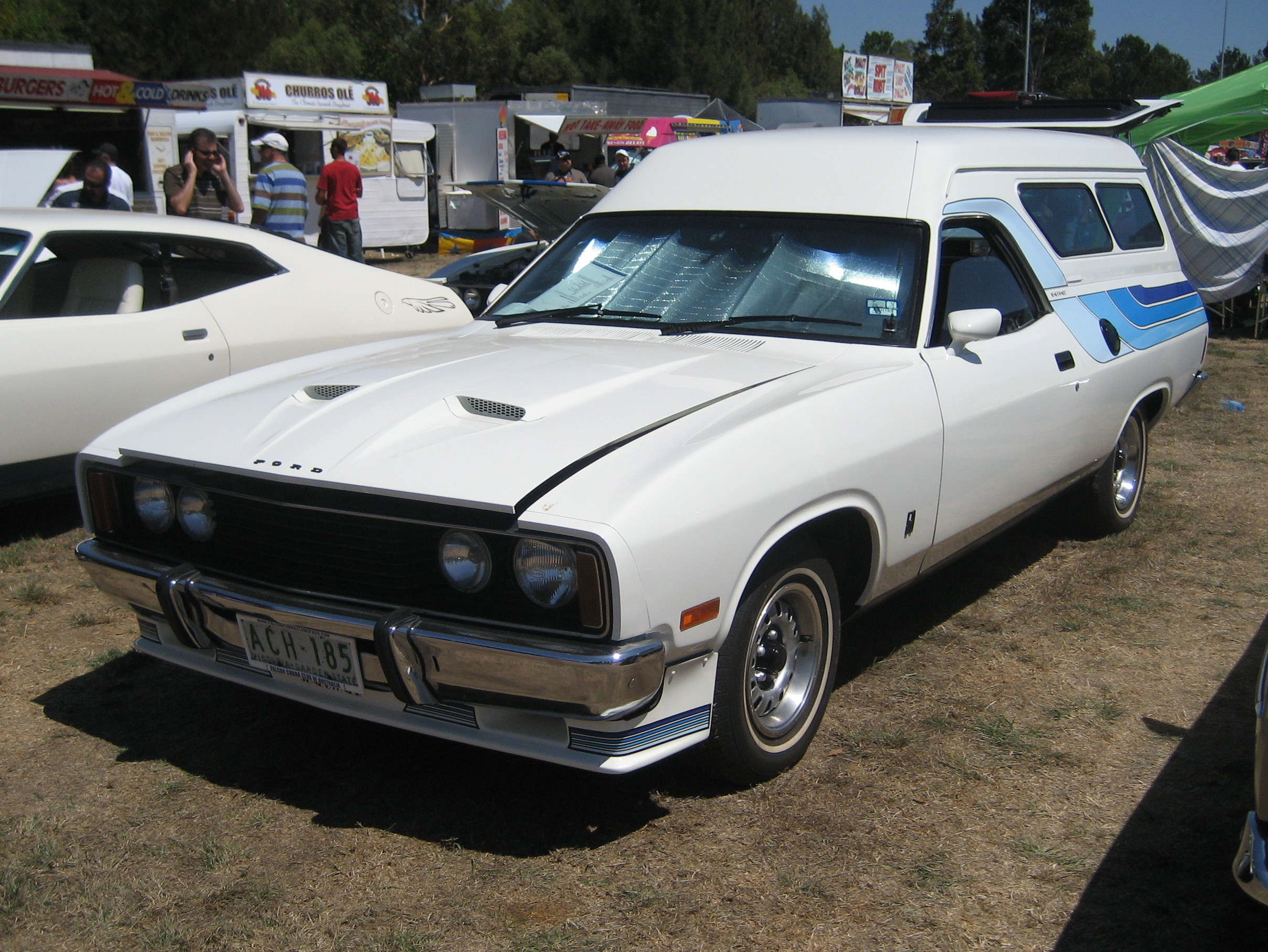
Ford Falcon Sundowner Panel Van (XC)

== Motorsport ==
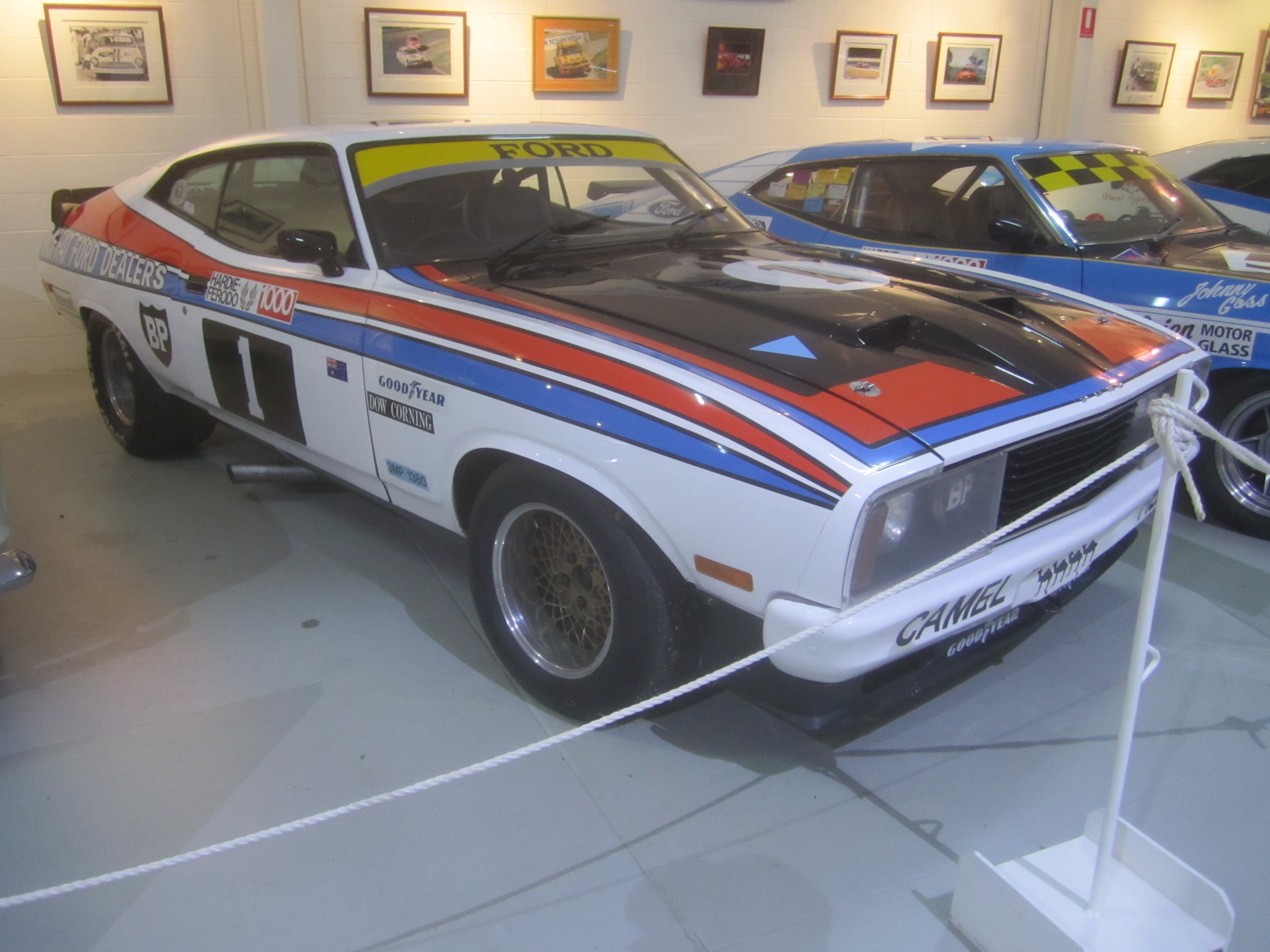
The 1977 Hardie-Ferodo 1000 winning Ford XC Falcon GS500 Hardtop of Allan Moffat and Jacky Ickx on display at the National Motor Racing Museum

At the 1977 Hardie-Ferodo 1000, Allan Moffat and Colin Bond drove Group C specification Hardtops to a "1, 2" formation finish. Moffat later went on to win the 1977 Australian Touring Car Championship driving both an XB Falcon GT Hardtop and XC Falcon GS 500 Hardtop. The GS 500 Hardtop formed the basis for the Ford Falcon Cobra and a customer racing program, with a special "Evolution" (and later Evo II) package to homologate parts.
