= 1986 Australian Touring Car season =

Seasons
- ← 1985 1987 →

The 1986 Australian Touring Car season was the 27th season of touring car racing in Australia commencing from 1960 when the first Australian Touring Car Championship and the first Armstrong 500 (the forerunner of the present day Bathurst 1000) were contested. It was the second season in which Australian Touring Car regulations were based on those for the FIA Group A Touring Car category.

Touring Cars competed at 21 race meetings in Australia during the 1986 season, contesting the following events:

- The ten rounds of the 1986 Australian Touring Car Championship (ATCC)
- The five rounds of the 1986 Australian 2.0 Litre Touring Car Championship, with four of these rounds held at ATCC meetings
- The six rounds of the 1986 Australian Endurance Championship, all of which were also rounds of the 1986 Australian Manufacturers' Championship. Round 5 of the AEC at Calder Park doubled as the opening round of the South Pacific Touring Car Championship
- The five rounds of the 1986 Better Brakes/AMSCAR series, held exclusively at Amaroo Park, with the opening round also an Australian Touring Car Championship round and the final round also an Australian Endurance Championship / Australian Manufacturers' Championship round
- The second round of the 1986 South Pacific Touring Car Championship, which was held as a support race at the 1986 Australian Grand Prix meeting at the Adelaide Street Circuit

== Season review ==
The second year of Group A in Australia saw the domination of the JPS Team BMW team fade with several other teams pushing forwards. Most spectacularly was the return of Nissan Motorsport Australia (now under the leadership of former Bathurst winner Fred Gibson) with the newly homologated Nissan Skyline DR30 RS turbo. Led by long time Nissan lead driver George Fury they were the main rival for another new team, the John Sheppard run Volvo Dealer Team, a factory supported team which succeeded the Mark Petch Motorsport Volvo team of 1985. The Touring Car Championship became a two horse race between Volvo's Robbie Francevic and Fury. Fury was never able to haul in Francevic's early points lead and Francevic was crowned champion. Francevic was fired from the Volvo Dealer Team by Sheppard the day after the Castrol 500 at Sandown after refusing to drive what he believed would be an un-competitive car which had only been completed at the meeting started. He then returned to the Mark Petch team as they began development of a Ford Sierra turbo. Although Francevic won the ATCC in the car, 1986 was the last time the Volvo 240T was seen in Australian touring car racing.

Defending ATCC, Endurance and AMSCAR champion, JPS Team BMW's Jim Richards picked up race wins during the season, claiming the Australian Endurance Championship. Peter Brock likewise returned to the winner list for Holden Dealer Team, dominating the Adelaide round of the ATCC before engine failure, and later claiming an ATCC win at Surfers Paradise which would prove to be the last time a Holden won a race in the championship until 1992. Brock's win at Surfers in his Holden VK Commodore SS Group A would also prove to be the 34th and last ATCC race win for the HDT who had won their first ATCC race when coincidentally Brock won at Surfers in 1973 in a Holden LJ Torana GTR XU-1 (Brock contributed 28 of those 34 wins with Colin Bond winning the other 6).

While Richards won the Endurance Championship through consistent placings, the big prizes went elsewhere. Nissan claimed the Sandown 500 with Fury and his new young team mate Glenn Seton (the son of 1965 Bathurst winner Barry Seton who also built the engines for the Nissan team), while Allan Grice and Graeme Bailey returned from their attempt at the FIA Touring Car Championship in Europe to claim victory in the Bathurst 1000, with Grice also winning the Group A support race at the Australian Grand Prix in Adelaide.

John Smith claimed the debut title for small touring cars, the distinction for the class was set at two litres leaving a field of Toyota Corollas, Isuzu Geminis and a Nissan Gazelle. The Amaroo Park based Better Brakes/AMSCAR series was claimed by JPS Team BMW's number 2 driver, Tony Longhurst driving the team's secondary car, a BMW 325i, the forerunner to 1987's BMW M3.

Australia hosted the opening two rounds of the inaugural South Pacific Touring Car Championship with the final three rounds held in New Zealand. The opening round also doubled as Round 5 of the Australian Endurance Championship at Calder Park while Round 2 was the Group A support race at the Australian Grand Prix. Allan Grice who won in Adelaide went on to claim the South Pacific title after a further win at Baypark in NZ.

== Race calendar ==
Date	Series	Circuit	City / state	Winner	Team	Car	Report
2 Mar	ATCC Round 1 Better Brakes/AMSCAR Round 1	Amaroo Park	Sydney, New South Wales	Robbie Francevic	Mark Petch Motorsport	Volvo 240T	
9 Mar	ATCC Round 2	Symmons Plains Raceway	Launceston, Tasmania	Robbie Francevic	Mark Petch Motorsport	Volvo 240T	
4 Apr	Better Brakes/AMSCAR Round 2	Amaroo Park	Sydney, New South Wales	Garry Rogers	Garry Rogers Motorsport	BMW 635 CSi	
13 Apr	ATCC Round 3	Sandown Raceway	Melbourne, Victoria	George Fury	Peter Jackson Nissan Racing	Nissan Skyline DR30 RS	
13 Apr	A2TCC Round 1	Sandown Raceway	Melbourne, Victoria	John Smith	Toyota Team Australia	Toyota Corolla	
27 Apr	ATCC Round 4	Adelaide International Raceway	Adelaide, South Australia	Robbie Francevic	Volvo Dealer Team	Volvo 240T	
27 Apr	A2TCC Round 2	Adelaide International Raceway	Adelaide, South Australia	John Smith	Toyota Team Australia	Toyota Corolla	
6 May	ATCC Round 5	Barbagallo Raceway	Perth, Western Australia	George Fury	Peter Jackson Nissan Racing	Nissan Skyline DR30 RS	
18 May	ATCC Round 6	Surfers Paradise International Raceway	Surfers Paradise, Queensland	Peter Brock	Mobil Holden Dealer Team	Holden VK Commodore SS Group A	
25 May	Better Brakes/AMSCAR Round 3	Amaroo Park	Sydney, New South Wales	John Bowe	Volvo Dealer Team	Volvo 240T	
1 Jun	ATCC Round 7	Calder Park Raceway	Melbourne, Victoria	Glenn Seton	Peter Jackson Nissan Racing	Nissan Skyline DR30 RS	
1 Jun	A2TCC Round 3	Calder Park Raceway	Melbourne, Victoria	John Smith	Toyota Team Australia	Toyota Corolla	
15 Jun	ATCC Round 8	Lakeside International Raceway	Brisbane, Queensland	George Fury	Peter Jackson Nissan Racing	Nissan Skyline DR30 RS	
22 Jun	Better Brakes/AMSCAR Round 4	Amaroo Park	Sydney, New South Wales	Jim Richards	JPS Team BMW	BMW 635 CSi	
29 Jun	ATCC Round 9	Winton Motor Raceway	Benalla, Victoria	Jim Richards	JPS Team BMW	BMW 635 CSi	
13 Jul	ATCC Round 10	Oran Park Raceway	Sydney, New South Wales	George Fury	Peter Jackson Nissan Racing	Nissan Skyline DR30 RS	
13 Jul	A2TCC Round 4	Oran Park Raceway	Sydney, New South Wales	John Smith	Toyota Team Australia	Toyota Corolla	
27 Jul	A2TCC Round 5	Lakeside International Raceway	Brisbane, Queensland	John Smith	Toyota Team Australia	Toyota Corolla	
3 Aug	Better Brakes 300; AEC Round 1 AMC Round 1 Better Brakes/AMSCAR Round 5	Amaroo Park	Sydney, New South Wales	Jim Richards	JPS Team BMW	BMW 635 CSi	
24 Aug	BP Plus 300; AEC Round 2 AMC Round 2	Surfers Paradise International Raceway	Surfers Paradise, Queensland	George Fury	Peter Jackson Nissan Racing	Nissan Skyline DR30 RS	
14 Sep	Castrol 500; AEC Round 3 AMC Round 3	Sandown Raceway	Melbourne, Victoria	George Fury; Glenn Seton	Peter Jackson Nissan Racing	Nissan Skyline DR30 RS	report
5 Oct	James Hardie 1000; AEC Round 4 AMC Round 4	Mount Panorama Circuit	Bathurst, New South Wales	Allan Grice; Graeme Bailey	Roadways Racing	Holden VK Commodore SS Group A	report
19 Oct	The Sun South Pacific 300; AEC Round 5 AMC Round 5 South Pacific Touring Car Championship Round 1	Calder Park Raceway	Melbourne, Victoria	George Fury; Glenn Seton	Peter Jackson Nissan Racing	Nissan Skyline DR30 RS	
25 Oct	South Pacific Touring Car Championship Round 2	Adelaide Street Circuit	Adelaide, South Australia	Allan Grice	Roadways Racing	Holden VK Commodore SS Group A	
8 Nov	Pepsi 300; AEC Round 6 AMC Round 6	Oran Park Raceway	Sydney, New South Wales	George Fury	Peter Jackson Nissan Racing	Nissan Skyline DR30 RS	

== Australian Manufacturers' Championship ==
The 1986 Australian Manufacturers' Championship was awarded to Nissan.

== Better Brakes/AMSCAR Series ==
Tony Longhurst (BMW 325i) won the 1986 Better Brakes/AMSCAR Series for JPS Team BMW from Colin Bond (Alfa Romeo GTV6) and his JPS team mate Jim Richards (BMW 635 CSi).

== 1986 Australian Grand Prix Support Race ==
South Pacific Touring Car Championship – Round 2
This race was a support event at the 1986 Australian Grand Prix meeting. The race was held over 32 laps of the 3.780 km (2.362 mi) Adelaide Street Circuit.

Pos.	Driver	No.	Team	Car	Grid
1	(Australia) Allan Grice	3	Roadways Racing	Holden VK Commodore SS Group A	6
2	(Australia) George Fury	30	Peter Jackson Nissan Racing	Nissan Skyline DR30 RS	5
3	(New Zealand) Graeme Crosby	6	Bob Jane T-Marts	Holden VK Commodore SS Group A	2
4	(Australia) Larry Perkins	11	Enzed Team Perkins	Holden VK Commodore SS Group A	7
5	(Australia) John Harvey	7	Holden Dealer Team	Holden VK Commodore SS Group A	9
6	(Australia) Glenn Seton	15	Peter Jackson Nissan Racing	Nissan Skyline DR30 RS	3
7	(Australia) Graeme Bailey	2	Roadways Racing	Holden VK Commodore SS Group A	17
8	(Australia) Tony Longhurst	25	JPS Team BMW	BMW 325i	10
9	(Australia) Graham Moore	22	Strathfield Car Radios	Holden VK Commodore SS Group A	12
10	(New Zealand) Trevor Crowe	73		BMW 635 CSi	13
DNF	(Australia) Peter Brock	05	Mobil Holden Dealer Team	Holden VK Commodore SS Group A	4
DNF	(Australia) Dick Johnson	17	Palmer Tube Mills	Ford Mustang GT	8
DNF	(New Zealand) Jim Richards	1	JPS Team BMW	BMW 635 CSi	1
