= 1986 James Hardie 1000 =

Motor race in Australia

Seasons
- ← 1985 1987 →

Layout of the Mount Panorama Circuit (1938–1986)

The 1986 James Hardie 1000 was an endurance motor race held on 5 October 1986 at the Mount Panorama Circuit, just outside Bathurst in New South Wales, Australia. The race, which was the 27th running of the Bathurst 1000 touring car race, was the fourth round of both the 1986 Australian Endurance Championship and the 1986 Australian Manufacturers' Championship.

Allan Grice (in his 15th Great Race start) and his 1986 co-driver and team sponsor through his Chickadee Chicken business Graeme Bailey, took their Roadways Racing built Holden VK Commodore SS Group A to victory over the similar Holden Dealer Team Commodore John Harvey and Neal Lowe. Third was the factory backed Nissan Skyline of pole winner Gary Scott and Terry Shiel.

Dick Johnson and Gregg Hansford finished fourth in their Ford Mustang, while the "Super" team of former rivals Peter Brock and Allan Moffat, who had won 12 of the previous 16 races at Bathurst, finished in fifth place one lap down in their repaired HDT Commodore after losing almost 3 laps in the pits with an oil cooler problem while in a strong second place.

Belgian jeweller Michel Delcourt, who finished 7th with veteran Graham Moore in a Commodore, won the Rookie of the Year award. Moore and Delcourt had qualified a Mitsubishi Starion in 50th place for the 1985 race, but the car was withdrawn and did not start.

== Class structure ==
The race was held for cars complying with Australian Touring Car regulations, which were based on International Group A touring car rules. It included three engine capacity classes.

=== Class A ===
For cars of up to 2000cc engine capacity, it saw a variety of cars entered. Most numerous were variations of Toyota Corollas, with individual entries of a turbocharged Fiat Uno, a Ford Escort and a Nissan Gazelle.

=== Class B ===
For cars of between 2001 and 3000cc engine capacity, it featured the turbos; Mitsubishi Starion, Nissan Skyline and Volvo 240, but also included Alfa Romeo GTV6, BMW 323i, Mercedes-Benz 190E and Toyota Supra.

=== Class C ===
For cars of over 3000cc engine capacity. Apart from a strong presence of BMW 635 CSi, the swansong of the V12 Jaguar XJS, and the first appearance of a turbocharged Ford Sierra, it was the domain of the V8; Holden Commodore SS Group A, Ford Mustang and Rover Vitesse.

== Hardies Heroes ==
In a major change to the format, 1986 was the first time in the history of Hardies Heroes that drivers only had one lap to set a time. From 1978–1985, drivers had two laps in which to set a time.

Pos	No	Team	Driver	Car	HH	Qual
Pole	15	Peter Jackson Nissan Racing	(Australia) Gary Scott	Nissan Skyline DR30 RS	2:17.159	2:18.29
2	2	Roadways Racing	(Australia) Allan Grice	Holden VK Commodore SS Group A	2:17.246	2:16.16
3	30	Peter Jackson Nissan Racing	(Australia) George Fury	Nissan Skyline DR30 RS	2:19.044	2:18.68
4	11	Enzed Team Perkins	(Australia) Larry Perkins	Holden VK Commodore SS Group A	2:19.433	2:19.39
5	44	Volvo Dealer Team	(Australia) John Bowe	Volvo 240T	2:19.594	2:18.58
6	17	Palmer Tube Mills	(Australia) Dick Johnson	Ford Mustang GT	2:19.808	2:18.84
7	6	Bob Jane T-Marts	(New Zealand) Graeme Crosby	Holden VK Commodore SS Group A	2:20.370*	2:19.93
8	1	JPS Team BMW	(New Zealand) Jim Richards	BMW 635 CSi	2:20.751	2:19.53
9	21	Goold Motorsport	(Italy) Roberto Ravaglia	BMW 635 CSi	2:20.955	2:18.19
10	53	Mitsubishi Ralliart	(Australia) Brad Jones	Mitsubishi Starion Turbo	2:35.969	2:18.91

* Peter Brock had qualified the #05 Holden Dealer Team Commodore 2nd fastest with a 2:18.10 but the car was heavily damaged in a crash in Fridays's qualifying by Allan Moffat and was not repaired in time for Hardies Heroes and was subsequently withdrawn from the session by the team. Race organisers the Australian Racing Drivers Club (ARDC) then elevated the Graeme Crosby Commodore into the Top 10 Runoff in its place. Brock had also qualified the HDT's #3 car with a time of 2:17.7 (good enough for 2nd behind Grice), but the race rules prevented car swapping in qualifying and his time only served to qualify him in car #3 for the race and not Hardie's Heroes. It was the first time Brock would not appear in the Saturday morning runoff since its inception in 1978, leaving Dick Johnson as the only driver to have done so.
* Allan Grice became the first Group A driver to lap the 6.172 km (3.835 mi) circuit at over 100 mph (161 km/h) with a 2:16.16 lap in Friday qualifying in his Holden VK Commodore SS Group A. Grice had also been the first to lap the track at over 100 mph in a Group C touring car in 1982 driving a VH Commodore. He had also set his qualifying time running on Dunlop Tyres and not the Yokohama's he was required by contract to run when the television cameras were running in the runoff.
* Through their mutual Philip Morris cigarette sponsorship, the Peter Jackson Nissan team had tyre warmers for their cars flown out from the McLaren Formula One team in England to cope with the cold conditions, the first time the technology had been used in Australian touring car racing. Despite this and the fact that he was the only driver to improve on his qualifying time, pole winner Gary Scott believed the tyres on the Nissan Skyline RS DR30 were still not up to full operating temperature. This was put down to the fact that after team finally got the blankets working, Ch.7 had the Top 10 cars line up for 45 minutes on pit straight to film part of their TV package shown around the country later in the afternoon during which time the tyres cooled back down.
* Roberto Ravaglia had been officially second fastest in qualifying behind Grice with a time of 2:18.19, aided by a tow from a couple of Commodore's down Conrod Straight. Without the tow, Ravaglia fell to 9th in the runoff. Ravaglia and his co-driver Dieter Quester weren't originally scheduled to drive the BMW 635 CSi. Originally advertised to be driving were BMW factory Formula One drivers Riccardo Patrese and Gerhard Berger.
* The 1986 version of Hardie's Heroes saw four new drivers contesting the Saturday morning runoff for pole position. Pole winner Scott, John Bowe (5th), Graeme Crosby (7th), and Brad Jones (10th). Scott (1979 and 1982) and Bowe (1985) had previously been in cars that had qualified for the runoff, but it was their respective co-drivers who had set the times.
* Brad Jones, whose Mitsubishi Starion had been the fastest car on Conrod Straight during qualifying at 269 km/h (167 mph), was forced by officials to run on smaller width wheels during the runoff after checks revealed the car was using wider tyres than was allowed. Jones aborted his lap in Hardies Heroes at the top of the mountain after the smaller wheels caused the car to handle badly.

== Official results ==
Pos	Class	No	Team	Drivers	Car	Laps	Qual Pos	Shootout Pos
1	C	2	Roadways Racing	(Australia) Allan Grice (Australia) Graeme Bailey	Holden VK Commodore SS Group A	163	1	2
2	C	3	Mobil Holden Dealer Team	(Australia) John Harvey (New Zealand) Neal Lowe	Holden VK Commodore SS Group A	163	13	
3	B	15	Peter Jackson Nissan Racing	(Australia) Gary Scott (Australia) Terry Shiel	Nissan Skyline DR30 RS	163	3	1
4	C	17	Palmer Tube Mills	(Australia) Dick Johnson (Australia) Gregg Hansford	Ford Mustang GT	162	5	6
5	C	05	Mobil Holden Dealer Team	(Australia) Peter Brock (Canada) Allan Moffat	Holden VK Commodore SS Group A	162	11	
6	C	1	JPS Team BMW	(New Zealand) Jim Richards (Australia) Tony Longhurst	BMW 635 CSi	161	8	8
7	C	22	Formula 1 Investments P/L	(Australia) Graham Moore (Belgium) Michel Delcourt	Holden VK Commodore SS Group A	158	18	
8	C	8	Cullen Supa Salvage	(Australia) Warren Cullen (Australia) Gary Sprague	Holden VK Commodore SS Group A	157	12	
9	B	41	Bob Jane T-Marts	(New Zealand) Denny Hulme (Austria) Franz Klammer	Mercedes-Benz 190E	157	23	
10	B	36	Everlast Battery Service	(Australia) Murray Carter (Australia) Bill O'Brien	Nissan Skyline DR30 RS	157	42	
11	B	42	Volvo Dealer Team	(New Zealand) Graham McRae (New Zealand) Neville Crichton (Australia) John Bowe	Volvo 240T	156	24	
12	C	37	Airport Car Rental	(Australia) Chris Clearihan (Australia) Fred Geissler	Holden VK Commodore SS Group A	156	34	
13	C	6	Bob Jane T-Marts	(New Zealand) Graeme Crosby (New Zealand) Wayne Wilkinson	Holden VK Commodore SS Group A	156	10	7
14	C	19	Tony Mulvihill	(Australia) Ken Mathews (Australia) Tony Mulvihill (Australia) Barry Jones	Holden VK Commodore SS Group A	155	31	
15	C	23	Lusty Engineering P/L	(Australia) Graham Lusty (Australia) John Lusty	Holden VK Commodore SS Group A	154	37	
16	C	38	Grellis Marketing	(Australia) Kerry Baily (Australia) Ray Ellis	Holden VK Commodore SS Group A	150	33	
17	C	26	Simon Emmerling	(Australia) Simon Emmerling (Australia) Trevor Hine	BMW 635 CSi	149	45	
18	B	57	Network Alfa	(Australia) Lucio Cesario (Australia) Warwick Rooklyn	Alfa Romeo GTV6	148	47	
19	A	61	Toyota Team Australia	(New Zealand) John Faulkner (Australia) Mike Quinn	Toyota Corolla GT	148	52	
20	C	91	Graham Lorimer	(New Zealand) Graham Lorimer (New Zealand) Phil Myhre	BMW 635 CSi	146	51	
21	A	60	Giddings Moss Vale Nissan	(Australia) Bruce Stewart (Australia) John Giddings	Nissan Gazelle	146	50	
22	C	18	Terry Finnigan	(Australia) Terry Finnigan (Australia) Steve Williams	Holden VK Commodore SS Group A	144	30	
23	C	48	The Xerox Shop	(Australia) Alan Taylor (Australia) Kevin Kennedy	Holden VK Commodore SS Group A	144	44	
24	C	10	John Goss	(Australia) John Goss (Australia) Bob Muir	Jaguar XJS	140	26	
25	C	11	Enzed Team Perkins	(Australia) Larry Perkins (Australia) David Parsons	Holden VK Commodore SS Group A	140	7	4
26	A	58	Ratcliff Transport Spares	(Australia) David Ratcliff (Australia) Don Smith	Toyota Sprinter AE86	140	58	
27	A	13	Bob Holden Motors	(Australia) Bob Holden (United Kingdom) Geoff Kimber-Smith	Toyota Sprinter AE86	138	55	
DNF	C	47	Brian Callaghan	(Australia) Barry Graham (Australia) Brian Callaghan	Holden VK Commodore SS Group A	140	25	
DNF	C	24	Jagparts	(Australia) Gerald Kay (Australia) Martin Power	Holden VK Commodore SS Group A	135	29	
DNF	B	87	Brian Bolwell	(Australia) Brian Bolwell (Australia) Tony Farrell	BMW 323i	124	54	
DNF	B	30	Peter Jackson Nissan Racing	(Australia) George Fury (Australia) Glenn Seton	Nissan Skyline DR30 RS	114		3
DNF	B	44	Volvo Dealer Team	(Australia) John Bowe (Australia) Alfredo Costanzo	Volvo 240T	113	9	5
DNF	B	75	Network Alfa	(Australia) Colin Bond (Australia) Peter Fitzgerald	Alfa Romeo GTV6	111	36	
DNF	C	34	Lansvale Smash Repairs	(Australia) Steve Reed (Australia) Trevor Ashby	Holden VK Commodore SS Group A	111	16	
NC	A	56	Frank Cecchele	(Australia) Gordon Mitchell (Australia) Allan McCarthy	Fiat Uno Turbo	110	59	
DNF	C	9	JPS Team BMW	(Australia) Kevin Bartlett (New Zealand) Trevor Crowe	BMW 635 CSi	109	17	
NC	C	32	John English	(Australia) John English (New Zealand) Glenn McIntyre	BMW 635 CSi	101	40	
DNF	C	35	Lester Smerdon	(Australia) Lester Smerdon (Australia) Geoff Russell	Holden VK Commodore SS Group A	100	28	
DNF	C	50	John Donnelly	(Australia) John Donnelly (United Kingdom) Simon Harrex	Rover Vitesse	98	53	
NC	B	49	Ray Gulson	(Australia) Ray Gulson (Australia) Frank Porter	Alfa Romeo GTV6	94	46	
NC	C	39	Trevor McLean	(New Zealand) Trevor McLean (New Zealand) Rod Downs	Holden VK Commodore SS Group A	90	43	
DNF	C	12	Garry Willmington	(Australia) Garry Willmington (New Zealand) Peter Janson	Jaguar XJS	88	14	
DNF	C	43	Anderson & O'Leary Ltd.	(New Zealand) Bruce Anderson (New Zealand) Wayne Anderson	Ford Mustang GT	81	39	
DNF	C	96	Tim Slako	(New Zealand) Tim Slako (Australia) Geoff Leeds	Rover Vitesse	77	32	
DNF	B	53	Mitsubishi Ralliart	(Australia) Brad Jones (Japan) Akihiko Nakaya	Mitsubishi Starion Turbo	61	6	10
DNF	C	4	Autopart Centre	(Australia) Peter McLeod (New Zealand) Glenn Clark	Holden VK Commodore SS Group A	48	15	
DNF	A	62	Bob Holden Motors	(Australia) Keith McClelland (Australia) Brian Nightingale	Toyota Sprinter AE86	38	57	
DNF	C	29	Ken Davison	(Australia) Ken Davison (Australia) Wally Kramer	Ford Mustang GT	36	48	
DNF	C	20	James Keogh	(Australia) Jim Keogh (Australia) Des Wall	BMW 635 CSi	30	41	
DNF	C	40	Motorsport Pacific Ltd.	(New Zealand) Robbie Francevic (New Zealand) Leo Leonard	Ford Sierra XR4Ti	27	21	
DNF	A	55	Motorsport Pacific Ltd.	(New Zealand) Andrew Bagnall (New Zealand) Ted Jarvis	Ford Escort RS 1600i	23	56	
DNF	C	7	Goold Motorsport	(Australia) Charlie O'Brien (Australia) Garry Rogers	BMW 635 CSi	19	22	
DNF	B	51	Team Nissan Racing NZ	(New Zealand) Graeme Bowkett (New Zealand) Kent Baigent	Nissan Skyline DR30 RS	13	38	
DNF	C	27	Dulux Auto Colour	(Australia) Alf Grant (Australia) John French	Holden VK Commodore SS Group A	11	20	
DNF	C	33	Michael Burgmann	(Australia) Mike Burgmann (Australia) Mal Rose	Holden VK Commodore SS Group A	5	27	
DNF	C	28	Yellow Pages	(Australia) Tony Kavich (Australia) Ralph Radburn	Holden VK Commodore SS Group A	4	19	
DNF	A	16	Toyota Team Australia	(Australia) John Smith (Australia) Drew Price	Toyota Corolla GT	3	49	
DNF	C	21	Goold Motorsport	(Italy) Roberto Ravaglia (Austria) Dieter Quester	BMW 635 CSi	2	2	9
DNF	B	14	Bob Jane T-Marts	(Australia) Andrew Miedecke (West Germany) Jörg van Ommen	Mercedes-Benz 190E	1	35	
DNS	B	77	Peter Williamson Toyota	(Australia) Peter Williamson (Australia) Mark Skaife	Toyota Celica Supra			
DNS	B	25	JPS Team BMW	(Australia) Tony Longhurst (New Zealand) Trevor Crowe	BMW 325i			

Italics indicate driver practiced this car but did not race.

== Statistics ==
- Provisional Pole Position - #2 Allan Grice - 2:16.16
- Pole Position - #15 Gary Scott - 2:17.159
- Fastest Lap - #2 Allan Grice - 2:18.99
- Average Speed - 155 km/h
- Race Time - 6:30:35.68

== Mike Burgmann ==
The 1986 James Hardie 1000 is unfortunately also remembered for the death of Sydney privateer Mike Burgmann. On lap 5, Burgmann's Holden VK Commodore SS Group A and the privateer Jaguar XJS of his friend Garry Willmington were neck and neck over the notorious second hump on Conrod Straight at approximately 260 km/h (162 mph) when the front of the Commodore got airborne (as cars did coming over the hump at that speed, more so for cars on the right hand side or outside part of the track which is where Burgmann was). The front of the Commodore moved slightly to the left and Burgmann, who was only a part-time racer, tried to correct by turning the wheel to the right. Unfortunately for Burgmann, the front tyres suddenly gripped when they landed and the car then turned into and hit the tyre barrier at the bottom of the well-known curved bridge at the end of Conrod with unabated speed causing the entire front end to be pushed back to the firewall. The car's roll cage did its job and the cabin survived the violent impact mostly intact. However, when officials reached the car they found Burgmann in what would normally be the back seat of the vehicle. While his driving seat had remained intact the force of the impact had broken the seat belt buckle which caused his body to be thrown out of the seat. Mike Burgmann became the first driver to die while competing in the Bathurst 1000 when he was pronounced dead on arrival at Bathurst Hospital.

== See also ==
- 1986 Australian Touring Car season
