= 1986 Australian 2.0 Litre Touring Car Championship =

The 1986 Australian 2.0 Litre Touring Car Championship was a CAMS sanctioned Australian motor racing title open to Group A Touring Cars of under 2.0 litre engine capacity. The championship was won by John Smith, driving a Toyota Corolla.

The title was the first of three Australian 2.0 Litre Touring Car Championships to be awarded by the Confederation of Australian Motor Sport with the second held in 1987. The championship was revived in 1993 for drivers of cars in the 2 Litre division of the 1993 Australian Touring Car Championship.

== Calendar ==
The championship was contested over a five-round series.

Round	Circuit	State	Date	Winning driver	Car	Note
1	Sandown	Victoria	13 April	John Smith	Toyota Corolla	Support to Round 3 of the 1986 Australian Touring Car Championship
2	Adelaide International Raceway	South Australia	27 April	John Smith	Toyota Corolla	Staged concurrently with Round 4 of the 1986 Australian Touring Car Championship
3	Calder Park	Victoria	1 June	John Smith	Toyota Corolla	Staged concurrently with Round 7 of the 1986 Australian Touring Car Championship
4	Oran Park	New South Wales	13 July	John Smith	Toyota Corolla	Staged concurrently with Round 10 of the 1986 Australian Touring Car Championship
5	Lakeside	Queensland	27 July	John Smith	Toyota Corolla	Stand alone round

== Championship results ==
Position	Driver	Team	Car	Points
1	John Smith	Toyota Team Australia	Toyota Corolla	150
2	David Ratcliff	Ratcliff Transport Spares	Toyota Levin	114
3	Bob Holden	Bob Holden	Toyota Sprinter	97
4	Drew Price	Toyota Team Australia	Toyota Corolla	51
5	Daryl Hendrick	Daryl Hendrick	Isuzu Gemini ZZ	47
6	John White	John White	Isuzu Gemini ZZ	37
7	John Giddings		Nissan Gazelle	27
7	Mike Quinn	Bob Holden Motors	Toyota Sprinter	27
9	Mike Freeman	Colin Spencer	Toyota Celica	20
