= Holden Royale =

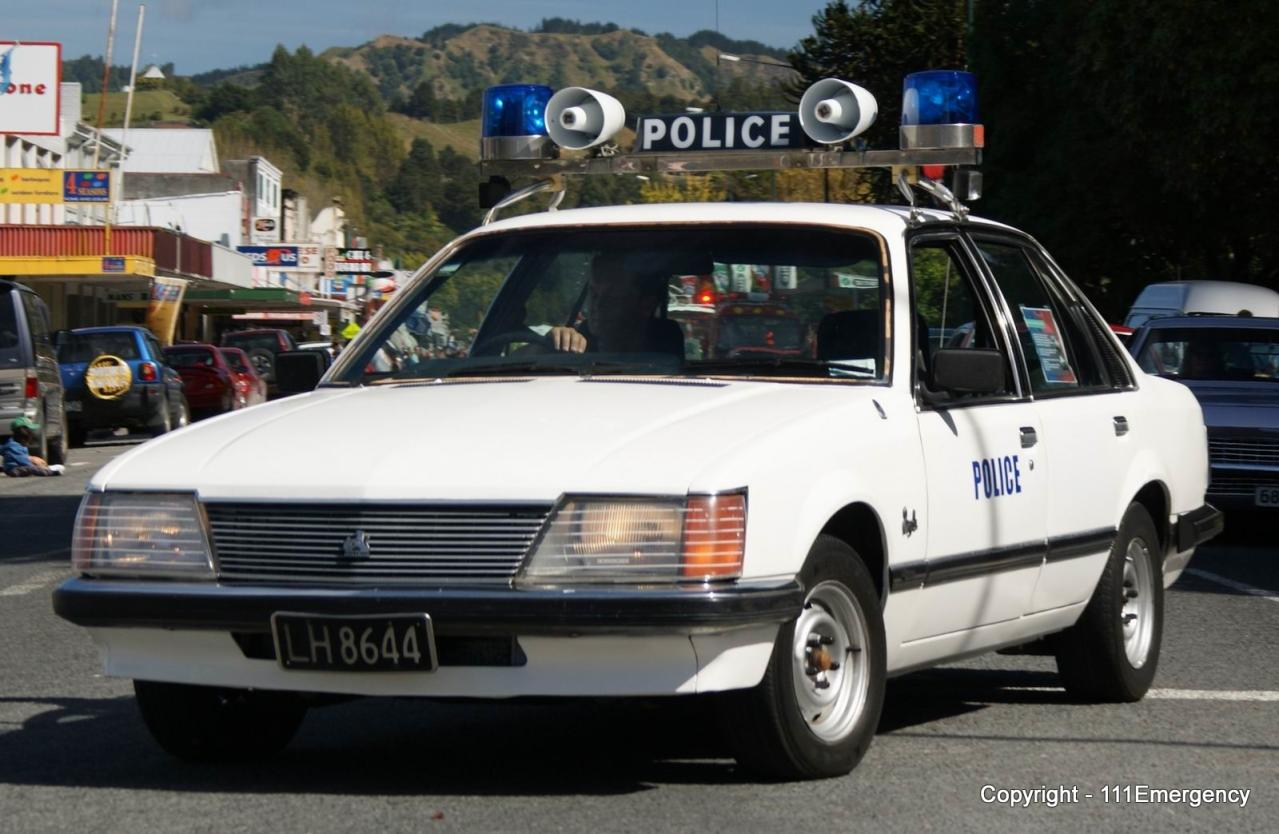
1981–1984 VH Commodore Royale

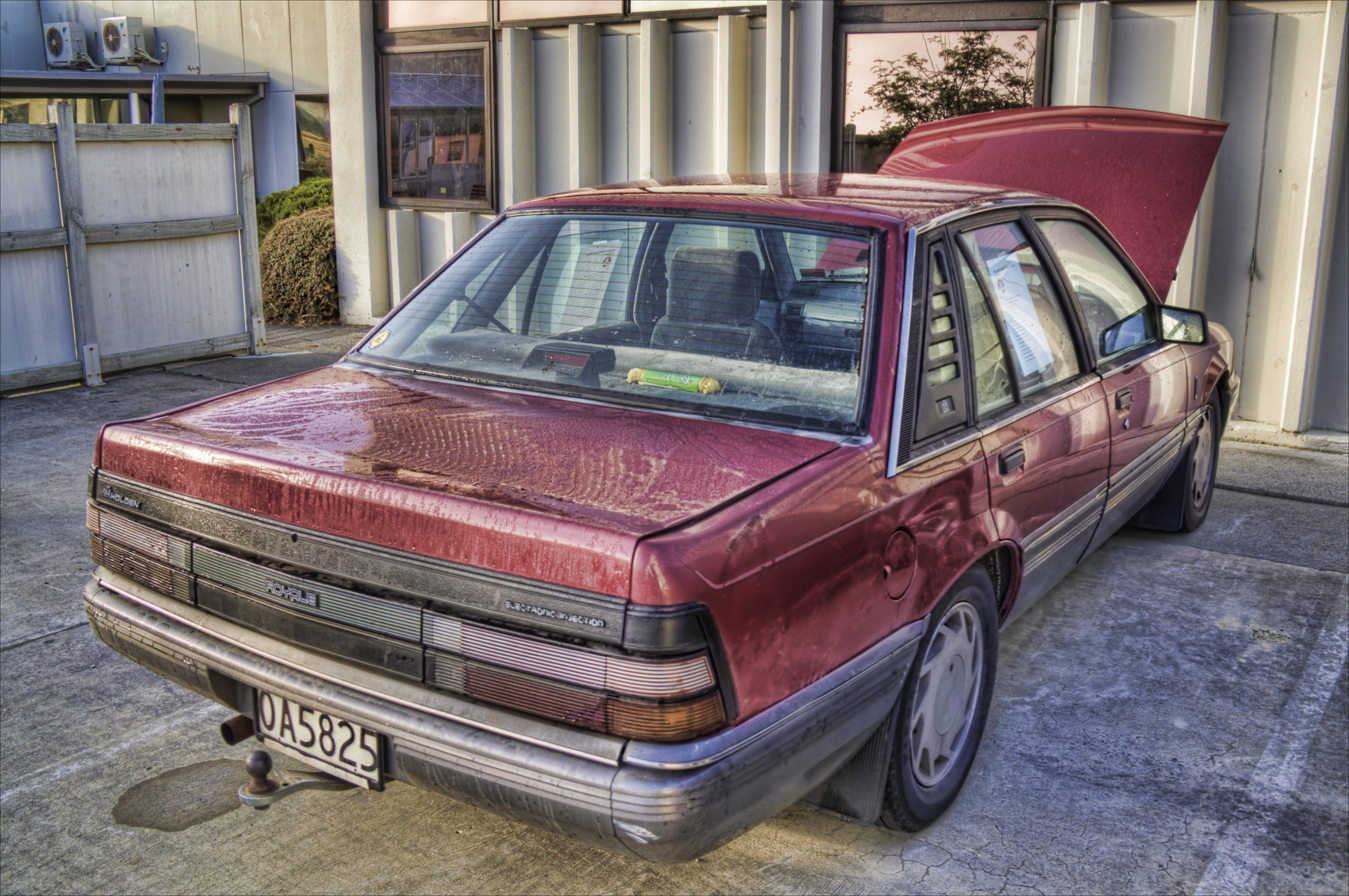
1987–1989 VL Commodore Royale

1989 VN Royale, stretched VN Calais

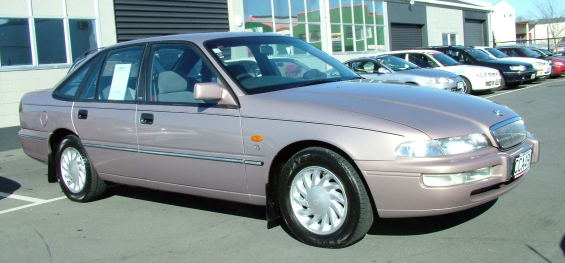
1998 VS II Commodore Royale

The Holden Royale and Holden Commodore Royale are a series of automobiles that were produced by the Australian manufacturer Holden for the New Zealand market:

- Holden Commodore (VH) Royale (1981–1984): trim level of the Holden Commodore (VH) sedan, built and sold exclusively in New Zealand. These VH Royales were similar in specification to the VH SL/E, but were fitted with the 1.9-litre Starfire inline-four engine mated to either a five-speed manual or three-speed automatic.
- Holden Commodore (VK) Royale (1984–1987): trim level of the Holden Commodore (VK) sedan, built and sold exclusively in New Zealand. VK Royales were based on the VK Calais, featuring the 1.9-litre engine as fitted to the previous VH Royale, or the optional 3.3-litre Black straight-six. Unique alloy wheels were also fitted (13-inch for the 1.9-, 14-inch for the 3.3-litre) along with several other minor detail changes.
- Holden Commodore (VL) Royale (1987–1989): trim level of the Holden Commodore (VL) sedan, built and sold exclusively in New Zealand. The VL Royale sold alongside the more upmarket VL Calais, but did not share its unique semi-concealed headlamps and rear disc brakes. If keyless entry was specified, it was fitted by Remac Components in Napier, New Zealand. Engine-wise, the 2.0-litre Nissan RB20 straight-six was fitted, with the 3.0-litre RB30E six made optional. Both engines were coupled with a four-speed automatic.
- Holden Commodore (VN) Royale (1992): trim level of the Holden Commodore (VN) sedan, built in Australia for exclusive sale in New Zealand. Like the VL, the VN Royale sold alongside the more upmarket VN Calais, but in this case was fitted with the 2.0-litre C20NE four-cylinder engine coupled with a four-speed automatic.
- Holden Royale (VN) (1989–1990s): stretched version of the Holden Calais (VN) sedan—being 1,200 millimetres (47 in) longer. Special Purpose Vehicles (SPV) in Sydney initially undertook the conversion, until later passing the job over to Jakab Industries Tamworth, New South Wales. In total, 54 examples were built, with the majority of examples exported to right-hand drive Asia-Pacific markets for airline, rental and hotel use, with an even smaller number of sedans special made featuring custom and optional Calais equipment.
- Holden Commodore (VS II) Royale (1998): version of the Holden Commodore (VS) sedan, built in Australia and sold exclusively in New Zealand. While in similar specification to the Calais also sold in New Zealand, the Royale featured the front-end of the Holden Caprice (VS), the alloy wheels from the Holden Berlina (VS) and 2.5-litre X25XE V6 engine manufactured by Opel. These cars sold in very small numbers through Ebbett Waikato dealerships in 1998 as they were a cancelled Singapore order (due to the 1997 Asian financial crisis) which could not be sold in Australia due to not meeting Australian Design Rules (ADR) standards but were compliant for sale in New Zealand. Earlier versions of the car were sold in Malaysia and Singapore as the Opel Calais, in both VR and VS series cars, although the VR models featured the 2.6-litre Opel straight-six in lieu of the 2.5.
- Holden Commodore (VT) Royale (1998–2000): version of the Holden Berlina (VT) sedan, built in Australia and sold exclusively in New Zealand.
- Holden Commodore (VX) Royale (2000–2002): version of the Holden Berlina (VX) sedan, built in Australia and sold exclusively in New Zealand.
