= 1987 James Hardie 1000 =

Motor race in Australia

1987 Bathurst 1000

Seasons
- ← 1986 1988 →

(Australia) 1987 Bathurst 1000
Race details
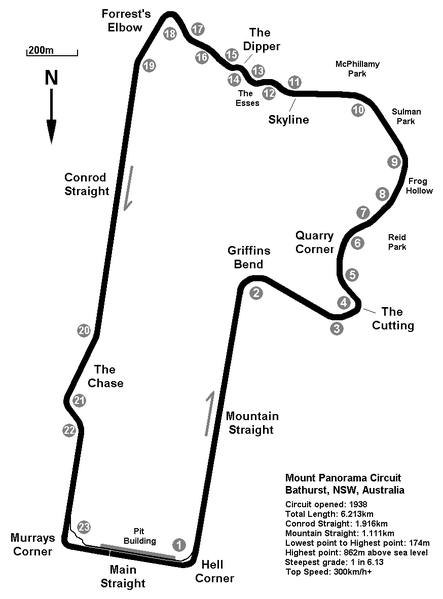
- Round 8 of 11 in the 1987 World Touring Car Championship at Mount Panorama Circuit in Bathurst, Australia.
- Date: 4 October, 1987
- Location: Bathurst, Australia
- Course: Mount Panorama Circuit; 6.213 kilometres (3.861 mi)
- Laps: 161
Pole position
Driver		(West Germany) Klaus Ludwig	Eggenberger Motorsport
Time		2:16.969	
Podium
First		(Australia) Peter McLeod (Australia) Peter Brock (Australia) David Parsons	HDT Racing
Second		(Australia) Glenn Seton (Australia) John Bowe	Peter Jackson Nissan Racing
Third		(Australia) George Fury (Australia) Terry Shiel	Peter Jackson Nissan Racing
Fastest Lap
Driver		(Australia) Andrew Miedecke	Oxo Supercube Motorsport
Time		2:22.50	

The 1987 Bathurst 1000, known for naming rights reasons as the 1987 James Hardie 1000, was an endurance race for Group A Touring Cars, staged on 4 October 1987 at the Mount Panorama Circuit, Bathurst, New South Wales, Australia. The race was the eighth round of the World Touring Car Championship.

The race was shortened from 163 laps to 161 for 1987, when the track was slightly lengthened by the addition of the Caltex Chase, a chicane which was built in response to the death of Mike Burgmann in an accident during the previous year's race.

The race was provisionally won by Eggenberger Motorsport, with Steve Soper and Pierre Dieudonné first across the line in a Ford Sierra RS500, two laps ahead of teammates Klaus Ludwig and Klaus Niedzwiedz. Third was the HDT Racing Holden Commodore VL driven by Peter McLeod, Peter Brock and David Parsons.

A protest lodged after the race resulted in the two Eggenberger cars being disqualified for illegally modified front wheel arch guards. A final appeal was rejected in March 1988.

== Classes ==
Cars competed in three classes conforming to World Touring Car Championship regulations:

- Class 1: The outright category was for cars with an engine capacity over 2500cc. The class consisted of BMW 635 CSi, Ford Sierra RS500, Holden Commodore, Maserati Biturbo, Mitsubishi Starion, Nissan Skyline and Toyota Supra.
- Class 2: The middle class was for cars with an engine capacity from 1601 to 2500cc. The class consisted of Alfa Romeo 75, BMW M3, Mercedes-Benz 190E and Nissan Gazelle.
- Class 3: The "baby" car class was for cars with an engine capacity from 1001 to 1600cc. It consisted of a variety of Toyota Corollas and a single Alfa Romeo 33.

== Hardies Heroes ==
The Top 10 runoff for pole position was a one-off event in the World Touring Car Championship. FISA initially objected to it but were ultimately powerless to stop it as it was written into the race regulations by the event promoters, the Australian Racing Driver's Club (ARDC).

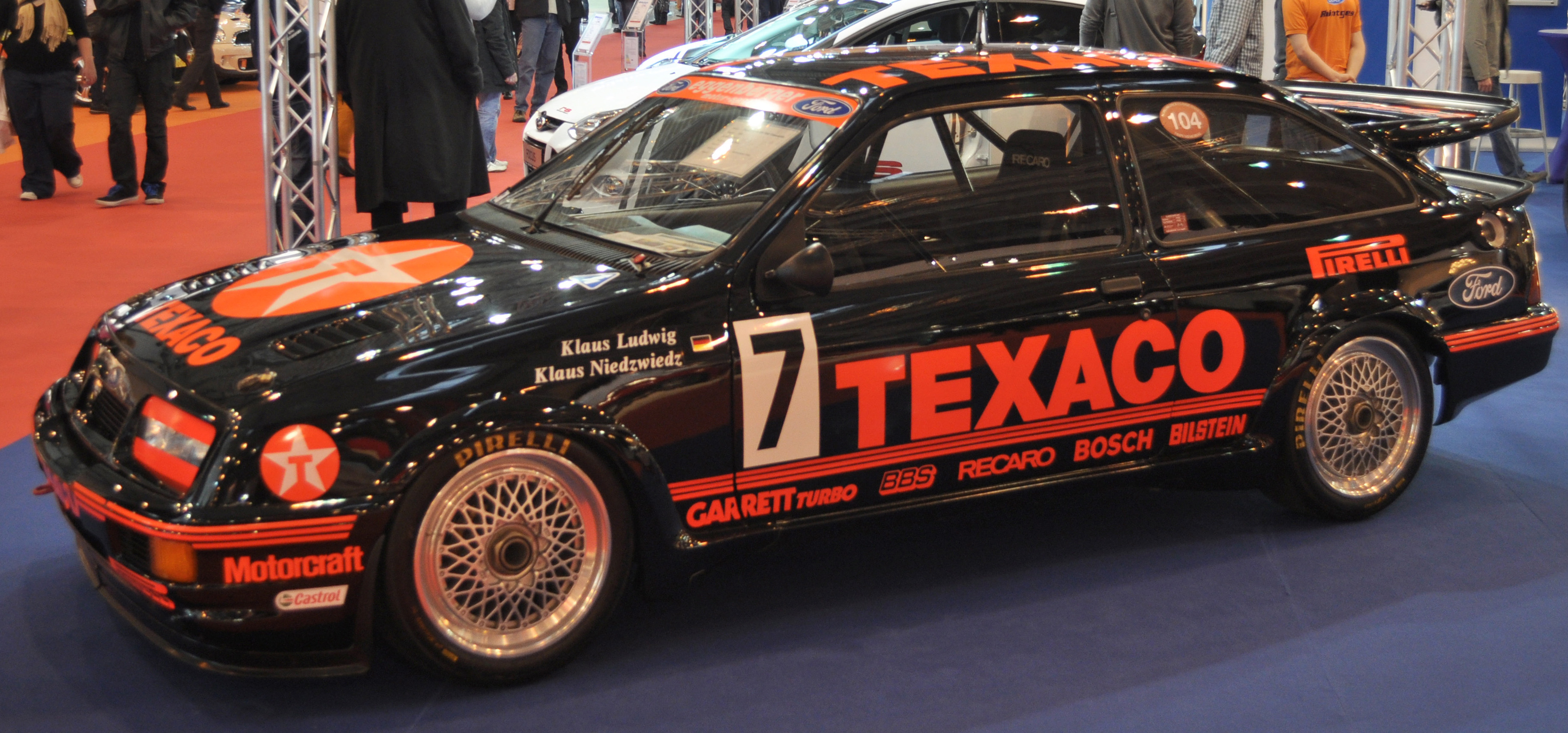
Klaus Ludwig gained pole position for the race in a Ford Sierra RS500

Pos	No	Team	Driver	Car	HH	Qual
Pole	7	(Switzerland) Ford Texaco Racing Team	(West Germany) Klaus Ludwig	Ford Sierra RS500	2:16.969	2:17.46
2	9	(Australia) Allan Moffat Enterprises	(United Kingdom) Andy Rouse	Ford Sierra RS500	2:18.468	2:18.12
3	6	(Switzerland) Ford Texaco Racing Team	(United Kingdom) Steve Soper	Ford Sierra RS500	2:18.663	2:20.52
4	12	(Switzerland) Ford Texaco Racing Team	(West Germany) Klaus Niedzwiedz	Ford Sierra RS500	2:21.318	2:20.96
5	35	(Australia) Oxo Supercube Motorsport	(Australia) Andrew Miedecke	Ford Sierra RS500	2:22.057	2:20.26
6	42	(Italy) BMW Motorsport / CiBiEmme	(Venezuela) Johnny Cecotto	BMW M3	2:23.147	2:21.48
7	2	(Australia) Roadways Racing	(Australia) Allan Grice	Holden VL Commodore SS Group A	2:23.626	2:21.38
8	11	(Australia) Enzed Team Perkins	(Australia) Larry Perkins	Holden VK Commodore SS Group A	2:24.209	2:22.28
DSQ	17	(Australia) Shell Ultra Hi-Tech Racing Team	(Australia) Dick Johnson	Ford Sierra RS500	2:22.744	2:20.18
DSQ	18	(Australia) Shell Ultra Hi-Tech Racing Team	(Australia) Charlie O'Brien	Ford Sierra RS500	2:21.452	2:21.50

* Three time 24 Hours of Le Mans winner Klaus Ludwig became the first Bathurst Rookie to take pole position for the race. With the addition of the new "Caltex Chase" complex on Conrod straight, lap times were around 4–5 seconds slower in 1987 than before. The general feeling was that Ludwig's pole time would have been even faster than George Fury's record 1984 pole time of 2:13.85 had the Chase not been there. With Ludwig on pole and Andy Rouse second, 1987 was the first time in race history that two Bathurst rookies had occupied the front row of the grid since qualifying times first counted for grid positions in 1967, though Rouse had been previously entered in 1976 but did not arrive, and one of his co-drivers was four time Great Race winner Allan Moffat, who was having his first race in a Ford since 1980. 1987 also marks Ford's first pole position at Bathurst since Allan Moffat claimed pole in his XB Falcon in 1976. It was also Ford's first front row start at Bathurst since Dick Johnson started second in 1981 in an XD Falcon, and the first time that Ford outnumbered other makes in the shootout.
* The two Dick Johnson Racing Sierras of Dick Johnson and Charlie O'Brien were had their times disallowed after failing a fuel check following the shootout. The team had mistakenly used fuel churns that had been filled at the team base in Brisbane and not at the track. It was of an inferior grade and actually made the engines produce less power than normal, but the penalty stood. Johnson was contesting his tenth consecutive Hardie's Heroes, being the only driver to have contested each one since its inception in 1978.
* The #12 Texaco Sierra driven by Klaus Niedzwiedz was withdrawn from the race following the shootout, with Niedzwiedz being Ludwig's nominated co-driver in the #7 Sierra. All qualified cars behind then moved up one place on the grid. 1987 was the first Hardies Heroes that Peter Brock failed to qualify for after qualifying twelfth. He did not appear in the 1986 shootout due to the car still being repaired following Allan Moffat's Friday crash, but Brock had qualified second before the crash.
* Countering the myth that only Bathurst regulars could be fast on The Mountain, 5 European based drivers qualified for the shootout. Klaus Ludwig, Andy Rouse, Steve Soper, Klaus Niedzwiedz (the top 4) and Johnny Cecotto. Only Soper (1984) and 1985 Rookie of the Year Cecotto had previously raced at Bathurst.

== Official results ==
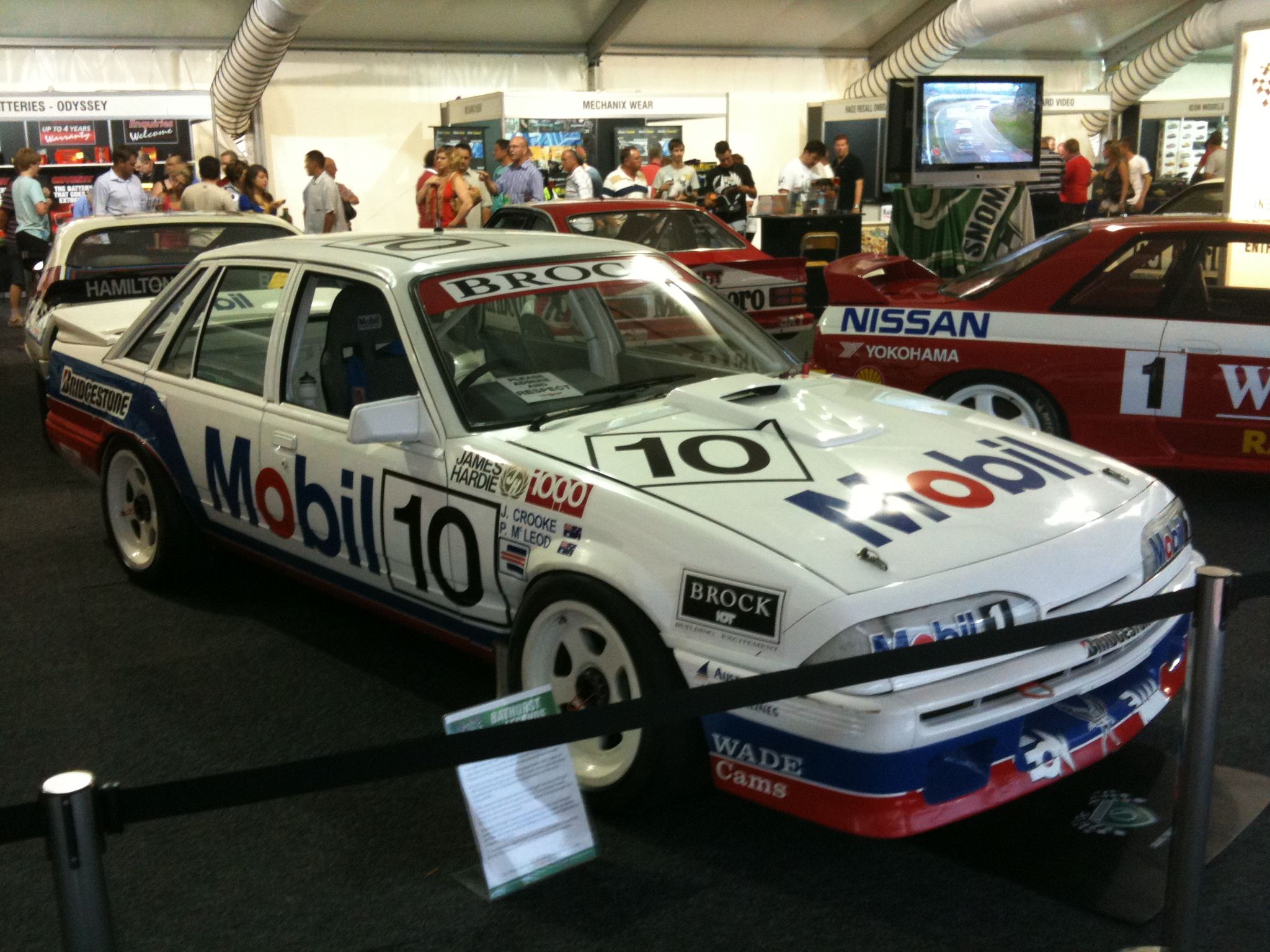
The winning Holden VL Commodore SS Group A, pictured in 2010.

Sourced from:

Pos	Class	No	Team	Drivers	Car	Laps	Qual Pos	Shootout Pos	Series Points
1	1	10	(Australia) HDT Racing	(Australia) Peter McLeod (Australia) Peter Brock (Australia) David Parsons (Australia) Jon Crooke	Holden VL Commodore SS Group A	158	20		
2	1	15	(Australia) Peter Jackson Nissan Racing	(Australia) Glenn Seton (Australia) John Bowe	Nissan Skyline RS DR30	157	15		
3	1	30	(Australia) Peter Jackson Nissan Racing	(Australia) George Fury (Australia) Terry Shiel	Nissan Skyline RS DR30	157	14		
4	2	44	(Australia) JPS Team BMW	(New Zealand) Jim Richards (Australia) Tony Longhurst	BMW M3	156	12		
5	1	16	Ralliart Australia	(Australia) Gary Scott (Japan) Akihiko Nakaya (Australia) John French	Mitsubishi Starion	154	23		
6	2	45	(Australia) JPS Team BMW	(New Zealand) Robbie Francevic (West Germany) Ludwig Finauer (New Zealand) Jim Richards	BMW M3	154	22		
7	2	42	(Italy) BMW Motorsport / CiBiEmme	(Venezuela) Johnny Cecotto (Italy) Gianfranco Brancatelli	BMW M3	154	8	6	40
8	1	4	(Australia) Formula 1 Investments	(Australia) Graham Moore (Belgium) Michel Delcourt	Holden VK Commodore SS Group A	152	29		
9	1	26	(Australia) Kalari Transport Services	(Australia) Tony Noske (Australia) Gary Rush	Holden VK Commodore SS Group A	151	35		
10	1	39	(Australia) Lansvale Smash Repairs	(Australia) Steve Reed (Australia) Trevor Ashby	Holden VL Commodore SS Group A	150	38		
11	2	43	(Italy) BMW Motorsport / Bigazzi	(West Germany) Altfrid Heger (France) Olivier Grouillard (West Germany) Winni Vogt	BMW M3	150	16		30
12	2	40	(West Germany) Schnitzer Motorsport	(Italy) Emanuele Pirro (Italy) Roberto Ravaglia (West Germany) Markus Oestreich (Austria) Roland Ratzenberger	BMW M3	150	19		24
13	1	34	(Australia) Oxo Supercube Motorsport	(Australia) Bruce Stewart (Australia) John Giddings	Ford Sierra RS500	150	24		
14	1	38	(Australia) Everlast Automotive Services	(Australia) Brian Sampson (Australia) Bill O'Brien	Holden VL Commodore SS Group A	146	33		
15	1	27	(Australia) Ray Gulson	(Australia) Graham Gulson (Australia) Ray Gulson	BMW 635 CSi	146	41		
16	2	41	(Italy) BMW Motorsport	(Australia) Gary Brabham (Argentina) Juan Manuel Fangio II	BMW M3	146	18		
17	1	35	(Australia) Oxo Supercube Motorsport	(Australia) Andrew Miedecke (Australia) Don Smith	Ford Sierra RS500	144	4	5	
18	1	3	(Australia) Petro-Tech	(Australia) Peter Fitzgerald (New Zealand) Peter Janson	Holden VK Commodore SS Group A	144	37		
19	2	60	(Australia) Peter Jackson Nissan Racing	(Australia) Mark Skaife (Australia) Grant Jarrett	Nissan Gazelle	138	44		
20	1	29	(Australia) Mulvihill Racing	(Australia) Ken Mathews (Australia) Tony Mulvihill (Australia) Barry Jones	Holden VK Commodore SS Group A	136	32		
21	1	24	(New Zealand) Team Nissan Racing NZ	(New Zealand) Graeme Bowkett (New Zealand) Kent Baigent	Nissan Skyline RS DR30	135	17		
22	1	36	(Australia) Yellow Pages	(Australia) Tony Kavich (Australia) Kerry Baily (Australia) Allan Grice	Holden VK Commodore SS Group A	131	31		
23	3	93	(Australia) Bob Holden Motors	(Australia) Bob Holden (New Zealand) Bryan Bate (Australia) Garry Willmington	Toyota Sprinter AE86	123	47		
DNF	3	90	Toyota Team Australia	(Australia) Drew Price (Australia) John Smith (New Zealand) John Faulkner	Toyota Corolla GT	119	43		
DNF	3	91	Toyota Team Australia	(New Zealand) John Faulkner (Australia) Mike Quinn (Australia) John Smith	Toyota Corolla GT	118	45		
DNF	1	2	(Australia) Roadways Racing	(Australia) Allan Grice (United Kingdom) Win Percy	Holden VL Commodore SS Group A	96	7	7	
DNF	3	92	(Australia) Ratcliff Transport Spares	(Australia) David Ratcliff (Australia) Mark Gibbs	Toyota Sprinter AE86	96	49		
DNF	1	37	(Australia) Brian Callaghan Racing	(Australia) Barry Graham (Australia) Brian Callaghan	Holden VK Commodore SS Group A	86	26		
DNF	3	94	(New Zealand) Gullivers travel Limited	(New Zealand) Andrew Bagnall (United Kingdom) Chris Hodgetts (New Zealand) Mark Jennings	Toyota Sprinter AE86	77	46		
DNF	1	19	(New Zealand) Canam Enterprises	(New Zealand) Graeme Cameron (New Zealand) Wayne Wilkinson	Holden VL Commodore SS Group A	71	25		
DNF	2	50	(Australia) Riethmuller-Ward International Motorsport	(West Germany) Llyndon Riethmuller (Australia) Phil Ward (Australia) Chris Clearihan	Mercedes-Benz 190E 2.3-16	70	40		
DNF	3	100	(Italy) Alfa Romeo	(Italy) Giorgio Francia (Italy) Daniele Toffoli	Alfa Romeo 33	55	48		
DNF	2	47	(West Germany) BMW Motorsport	(West Germany) Anette Meeuvissen (Austria) Mercedes Stermitz (Austria) Roland Ratzenberger	BMW M3	45	42		
DNF	2	46	(West Germany) Schnitzer Motorsport	(West Germany) Markus Oestreich (Austria) Roland Ratzenberger (Italy) Emanuele Pirro (Italy) Roberto Ravaglia	BMW M3	41	13		
DNF	1	05	(Australia) HDT Racing	(Australia) Peter Brock (Australia) David Parsons	Holden VL Commodore SS Group A	34	11		
DNF	2	57	(Australia) Caltex CXT Racing	(Australia) Colin Bond (Australia) Lucio Cesario	Alfa Romeo 75	34	21		
DNF	1	9	(Australia) Allan Moffat Enterprises	(United Kingdom) Andy Rouse (Belgium) Thierry Tassin (Canada) Allan Moffat	Ford Sierra RS500	31	2	2	
DNF	1	32	(Australia) Warren Cullen	(Australia) Warren Cullen (Australia) Gary Cooke (Australia) Gary Sprague	Holden VK Commodore SS Group A	31	27		
DNF	1	1	(Italy) Pro Team Italia	(West Germany) Armin Hahne (Australia) Kevin Bartlett (Italy) Bruno Giacomelli	Maserati Biturbo	29	34		
DNF	1	22	(Australia) Lusty Engineering	(Australia) Graham Lusty (Australia) John Lusty	Holden VL Commodore SS Group A	17	39		
DNF	1	21	(New Zealand) D.F.C. NZ Ltd	(New Zealand) Graeme Crosby (New Zealand) John Billington	Holden VK Commodore SS Group A	9	28		
DNF	1	17	(Australia) Shell Ultra Hi-Tech Racing Team	(Australia) Dick Johnson (Australia) Gregg Hansford	Ford Sierra RS500	3	3	DSQ	
DNF	1	11	(Australia) Enzed Team Perkins	(Australia) Larry Perkins (New Zealand) Denny Hulme	Holden VK Commodore SS Group A	2	10	8	
DNF	1	18	(Australia) Shell Ultra Hi-Tech Racing Team	(Australia) Charlie O'Brien (New Zealand) Neville Crichton	Ford Sierra RS500	2	9	DSQ	
DSQ	1	6	(Switzerland) Ford Texaco Racing Team	(United Kingdom) Steve Soper (Belgium) Pierre Dieudonné	Ford Sierra RS500	161	5	3	
DSQ	1	7	(Switzerland) Ford Texaco Racing Team	(West Germany) Klaus Ludwig (West Germany) Klaus Niedzwiedz	Ford Sierra RS500	159	1	1	
DSQ	2	53	(New Zealand) Viacard Services	(New Zealand) Ian Tulloch (New Zealand) Trevor Crowe (Australia) Jim Keogh	BMW M3	151	36		
DSQ	1	14	(Australia) NetComm (Aust) Racing	(Australia) Murray Carter (Australia) Steve Masterton (Australia) Denis Horley	Nissan Skyline RS DR30	147	30		
DNS	1	12	(Switzerland) Ford Texaco Racing Team	(West Germany) Klaus Niedzwiedz (West Germany) Klaus Ludwig	Ford Sierra RS500	0	6	4	
DNQ	1	20	(Australia) Terry Finnigan	(Australia) Terry Finnigan (Australia) Geoff Leeds	Holden VL Commodore SS Group A				
DNQ	1	31	(Australia) Lester Smerdon	(Australia) Lester Smerdon (Australia) Bruce Williams	Holden VK Commodore SS Group A				
DNQ	1	23	(Australia) Jagparts	(Australia) Alf Grant (Australia) Gerald Kay	Holden VK Commodore SS Group A				
DNQ	1	33	(Australia) Peter Williamson Toyota	(Australia) Peter Williamson (Australia) Chris Clearihan (New Zealand) John Sax	Toyota Celica Supra				
DNQ	1	28	(Australia) Wayne Clift	(Australia) Bernie Stack (Australia) Wayne Clift	Holden VK Commodore SS Group A				
DNQ	1	25	(New Zealand) Team Nissan Racing NZ	(New Zealand) Kent Baigent (New Zealand) Graeme Bowkett	Nissan Skyline RS DR30				
DNQ	1	13	(New Zealand) Viacard Services	(New Zealand) Ian Tulloch (New Zealand) Trevor Crowe (Australia) Jim Keogh	BMW 635 CSi				

Italics indicate driver practiced this car but did not race.

== Statistics ==
- Provisional Pole Position - #7 Klaus Ludwig - 2:17.46
- Pole Position - #7 Klaus Ludwig - 2.16.969
- Fastest Lap - #35 Andrew Miedecke - 2:22.50 - Lap 19 (new lap record)
- Average Speed - 140 km/h
- Race Time - 7:01:08.40 (based upon when Car 6 crossed the line).

World Touring Car Championship
Previous race: 1987 RAC Tourist Trophy	1987 season	Next race: 1987 Bob Jane T-Marts 500
