= Holden Commodore (VK) =

Australian mid-size car

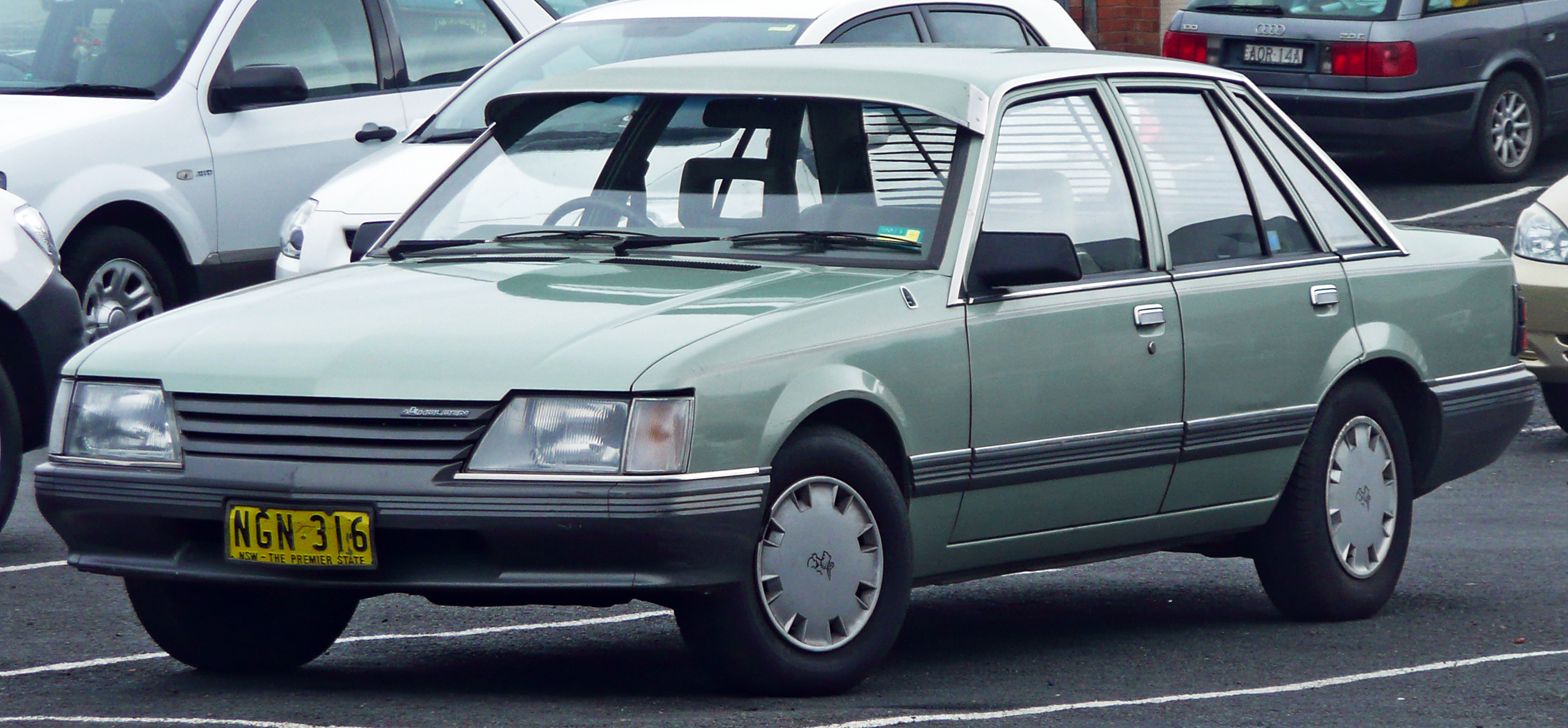
- 1984 Holden Commodore (VK) SL sedan

Overview
- Manufacturer: Holden (General Motors)
- Also called: Holden Calais (VK)
- Production: February 1984 – February 1986
- Assembly: Australia: Adelaide, South Australia (Elizabeth), Melbourne, Victoria (Dandenong); New Zealand: Wellington (Trentham); Indonesia (CKD)
- Designer: Leo Pruneau

Body and chassis
- Class: Mid-size
- Body style: 4-door sedan 5-door station wagon
- Platform: FR GM V platform
- Related: Opel Rekord E Opel Senator

Powertrain
- Engine: 1.9 L 54 kW (72 hp) Starfire 4 (New Zealand market only); 3.3 L 86 kW (115 hp) 'black' engine; 3.3 L 106 kW (142 hp) EFI 'black' engine; 5.0 L 126 kW (169 hp)-177 kW (237 hp) Holden V8 engine; 4.9 L 196 kW (263 hp) Holden V8 engine
- Transmission: 4-speed manual 5-speed manual 3-speed automatic

Dimensions
- Wheelbase: 2,668 mm (105.0 in)
- Length: 4,714 mm (185.6 in)
- Width: 1,722 mm (67.8 in)
- Height: 1,360–1,378 mm (53.5–54.3 in)
- Kerb weight: 1,220–1,366 kg (2,690–3,012 lb)

Chronology
- Predecessor: Holden Commodore (VH)
- Successor: Holden Commodore (VL)

The Holden Commodore (VK) is a mid-size car that was produced by Holden from 1984 to 1986. It was the fourth iteration of the first generation of the Holden Commodore and introduced the luxury sedan variant; the Holden Calais.

== Overview ==
The VK series was in production between February 1984 and February 1986 and was the first Commodore to have plastic (polypropylene) bumpers and introduced rear quarter windows for a six-window design (styled by Holden, but similar in appearance to the Opel Senator) as opposed to the four-window design on previous Commodore models. Apart from the bumpers and "glasshouse", other changes for the VK Commodore included a front grille redesign and revamped dashboard instrumentation that included a full digital (vacuum fluorescent display) arrangement for the new luxury version, the Calais.

The exterior of the VK Commodore was also updated with a more modern and aggressive appearance. This included a new grille design very different from previous models, with three bold strips rather than a metallic grille, the now plastic front and rear bumpers/skirts replacing the obsolete metal guards, and a new rear tail light assembly, whereby they now spread from one side to another with a black panel in between. This all added up to a more prominent, sharper look for the mid-1980s. Changes were also made to the interior whereupon the panel of instruments were now square-shaped rather than the more conventional circular layout. In total, 135,705 VK Commodores were built.

== Powertrains ==
Engine choices (not necessarily available on all cars in the VK range) were two versions of a 5.0-litre Holden V8 engine (replaced by the 4.9-litre V8 when Group A rules entered Australian motorsport in 1985, with the SS Group A being introduced in March 1985) and two versions of a 3.3-litre Black straight-six engine (essentially a refined Blue straight-six with slight increases in power and efficiency), the latter of which was now available with either a carburettor or fuel injection. The 3.3 EST (Electronic Spark Timing) carburettor engine was standard equipment for most VK Commodores, with the 3.3 EFI injection engine nominated as standard equipment for the Calais sedan. The EFI engine was originally not available in the station wagon, as the fuel injected model's electric fuel pump is located in the fuel tank (the EFI VK Commodores' fuel pump is external; they have no in-tank fuel pump). The reengineering of the wagon specific fuel tank was not finished in time for the VK's release, requiring around another eight months.

The 2.85-litre six-cylinder and the 4.2-litre V8, mainstays of the previous Commodore ranges were dropped, hence unavailable to the VK. However, Holden's 1.9-litre Starfire inline-four unit was offered on New Zealand-assembled VK models, sedans as well as wagons.

== Models ==
The VK range introduced new names for the specification levels, with Executive now a stand-alone nameplate alongside the base model SL. The Commodore Executive was basically a Commodore SL appointed with automatic transmission and power steering, and was aimed at capturing the fleet market, a market that Holden had lost its share in when the smaller bodied Commodore originally replaced the Kingswood. Also introduced was the Commodore Berlina (replacing the SL/X) and the Holden Calais (replacing the Commodore SL/E). The station wagon body style was available in SL, Executive or Berlina variants only, however the limited edition Vacationer name plate was also continued over for a period from the VH Commodore. Other variants produced were the Commodore SS sedan which featured its own specification – courtesy of HDT – high-performance 4.9-litre V8, and the limited edition – available only through affiliated HDT Holden dealers – LM 5000, SS Group 3, SS Group A (502 made) and Calais Director sedans.

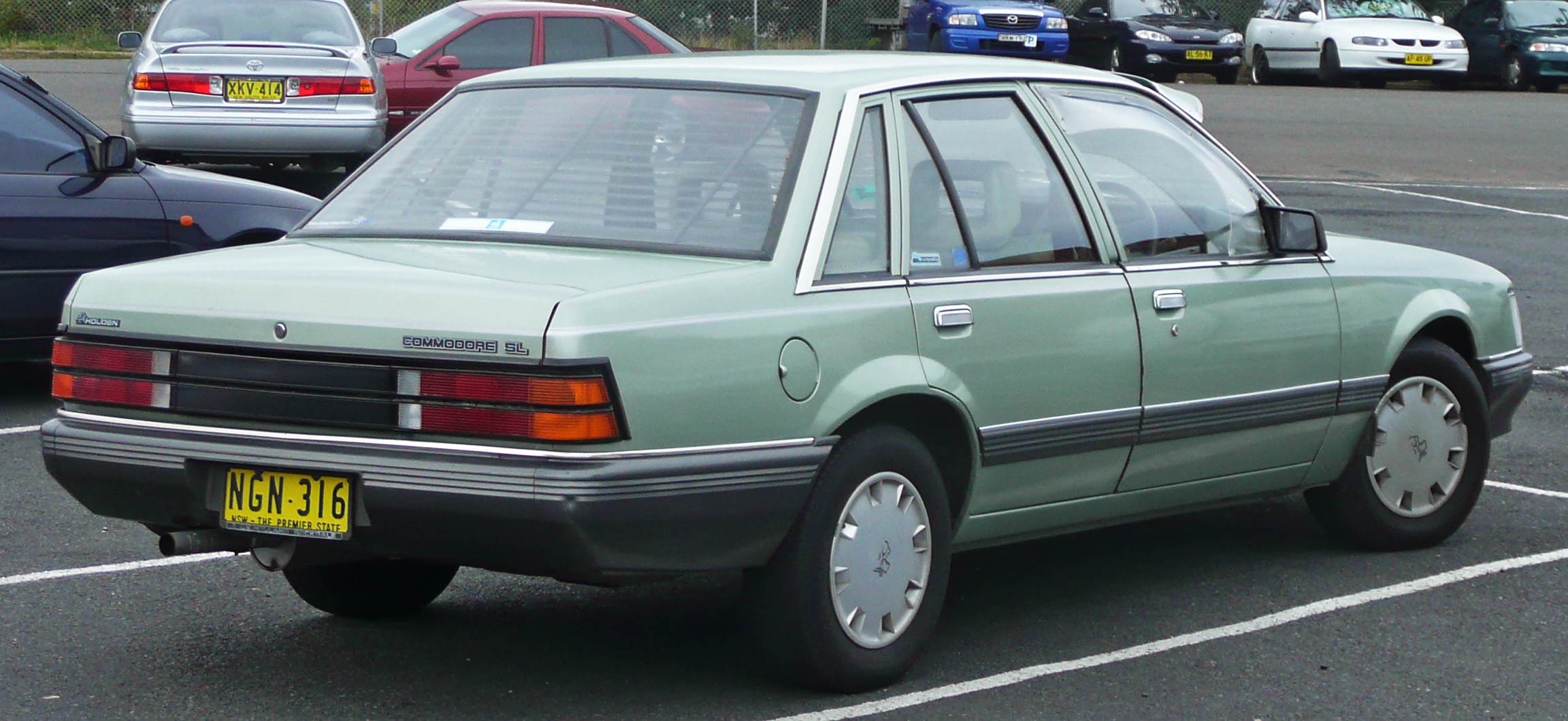
Holden Commodore SL sedan

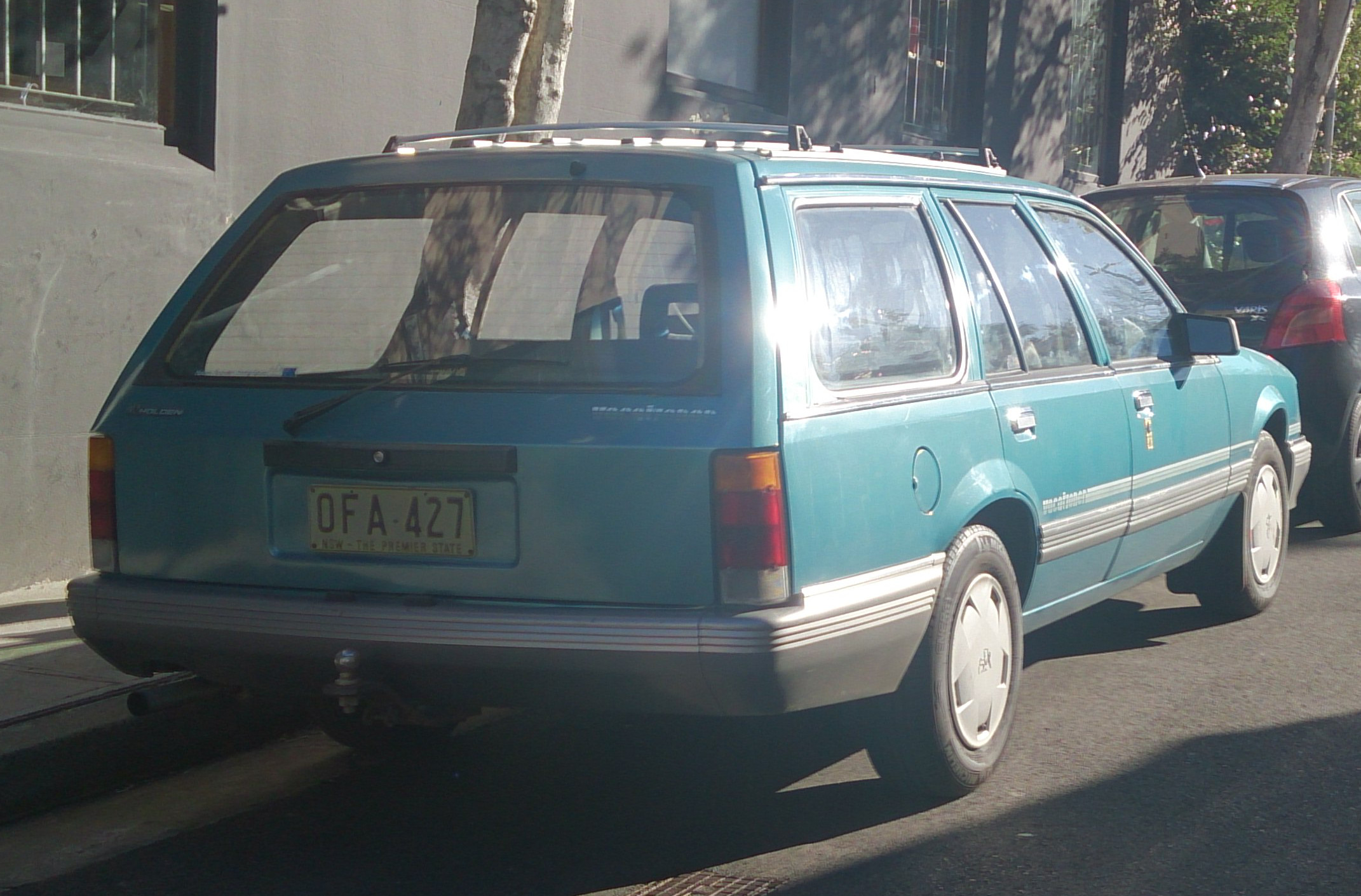
Holden Commodore Vacationer wagon

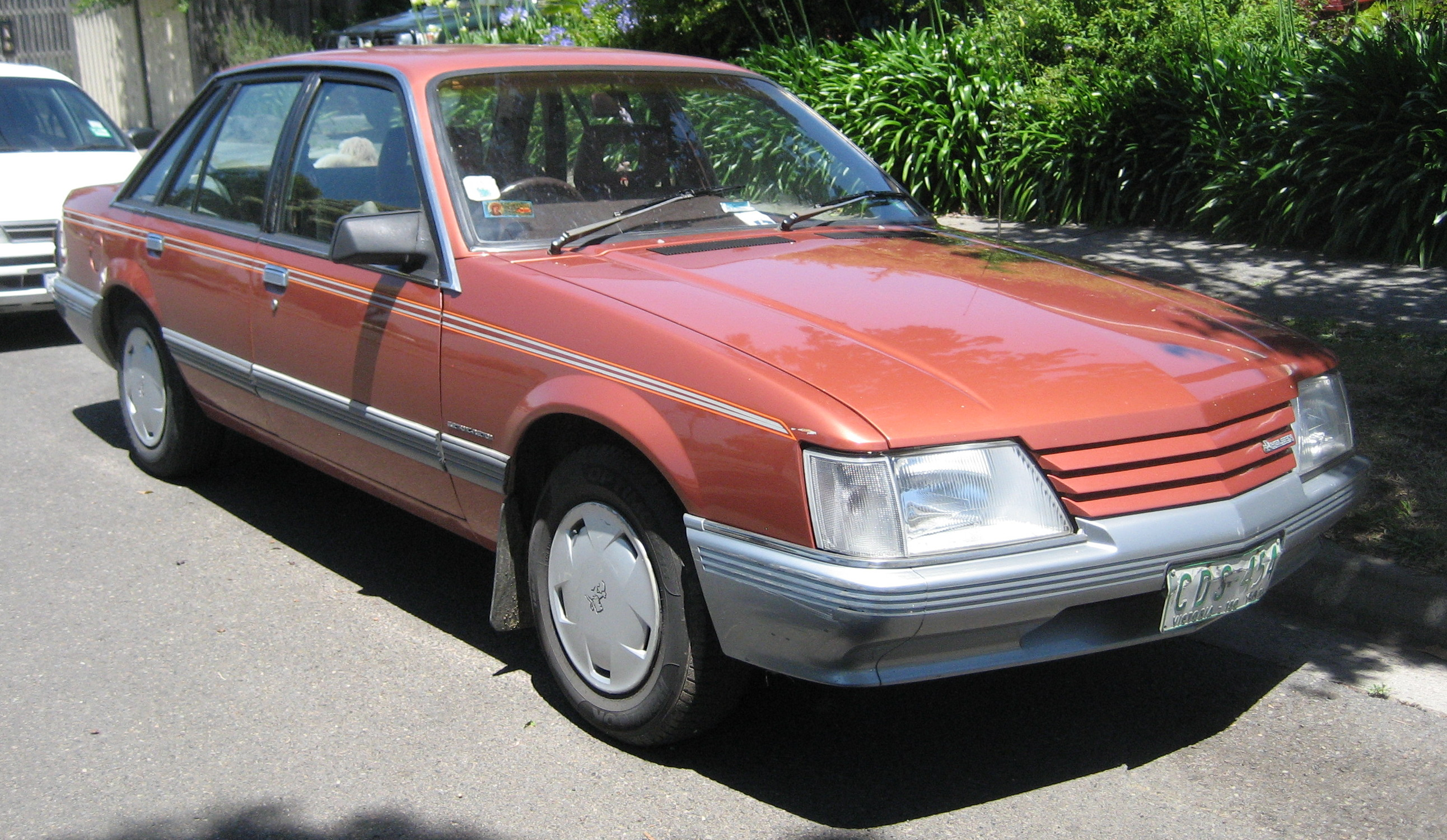
Holden Commodore Berlina sedan

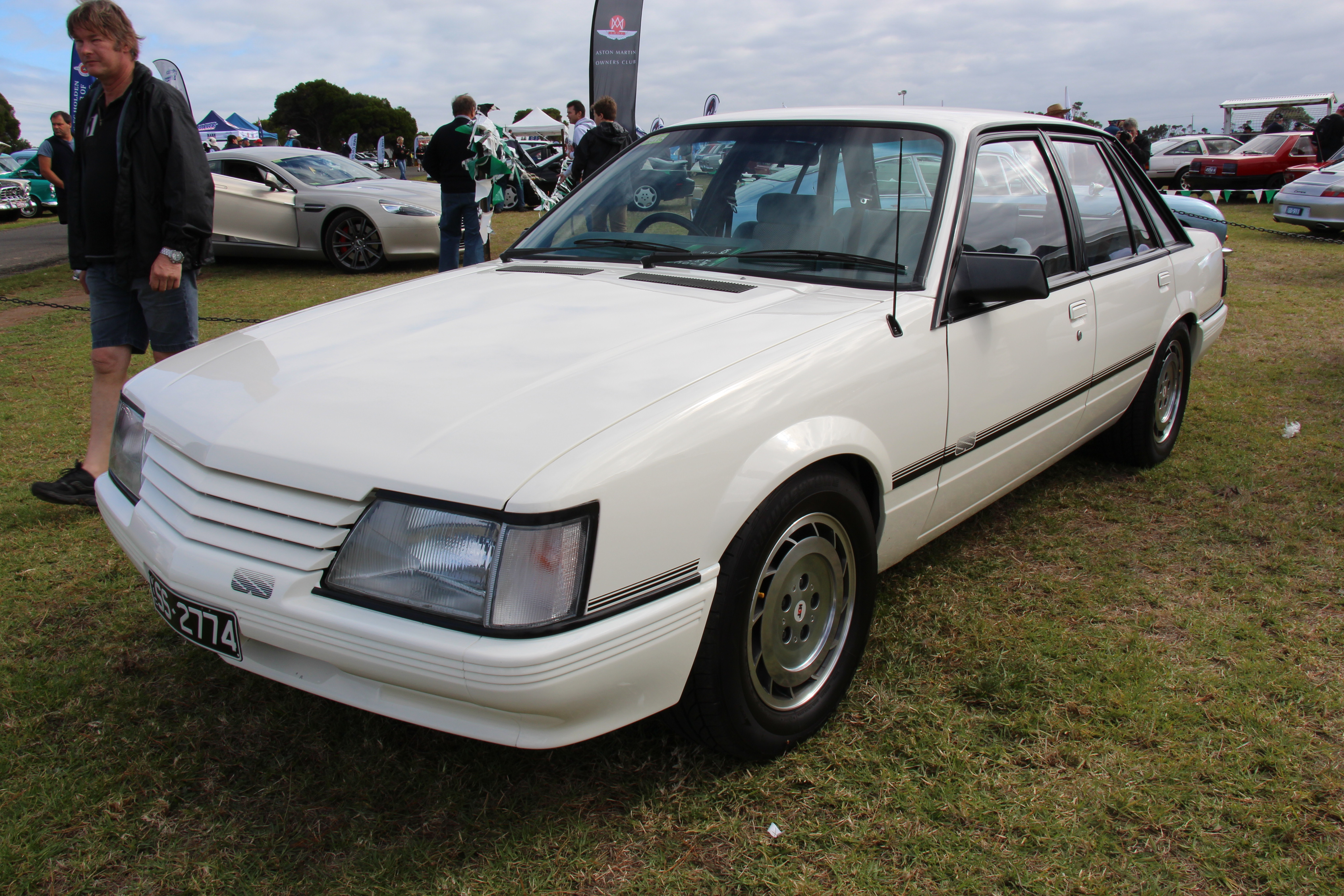
Holden Commodore SS sedan

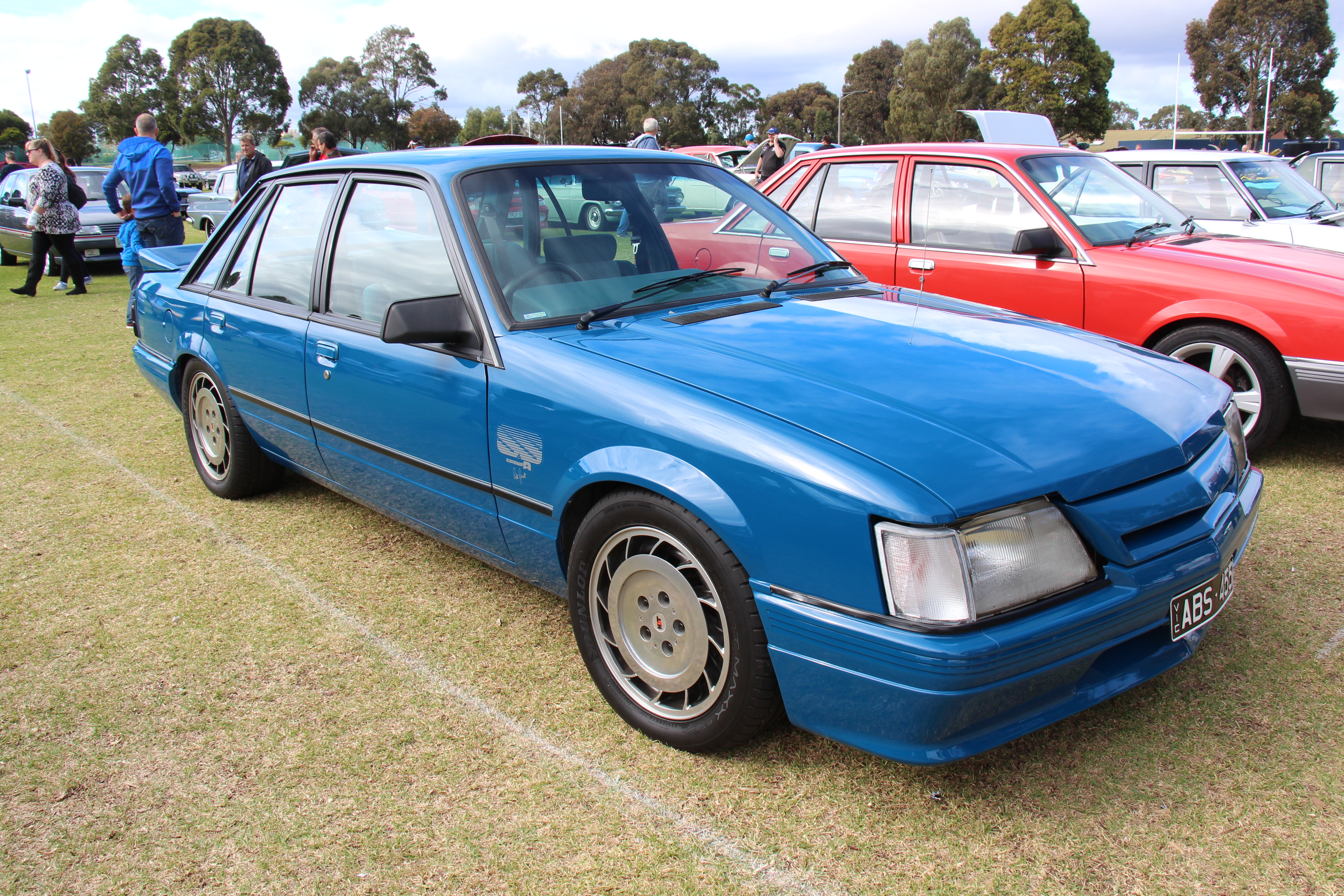
HDT Group A (196 kW based on Executive)

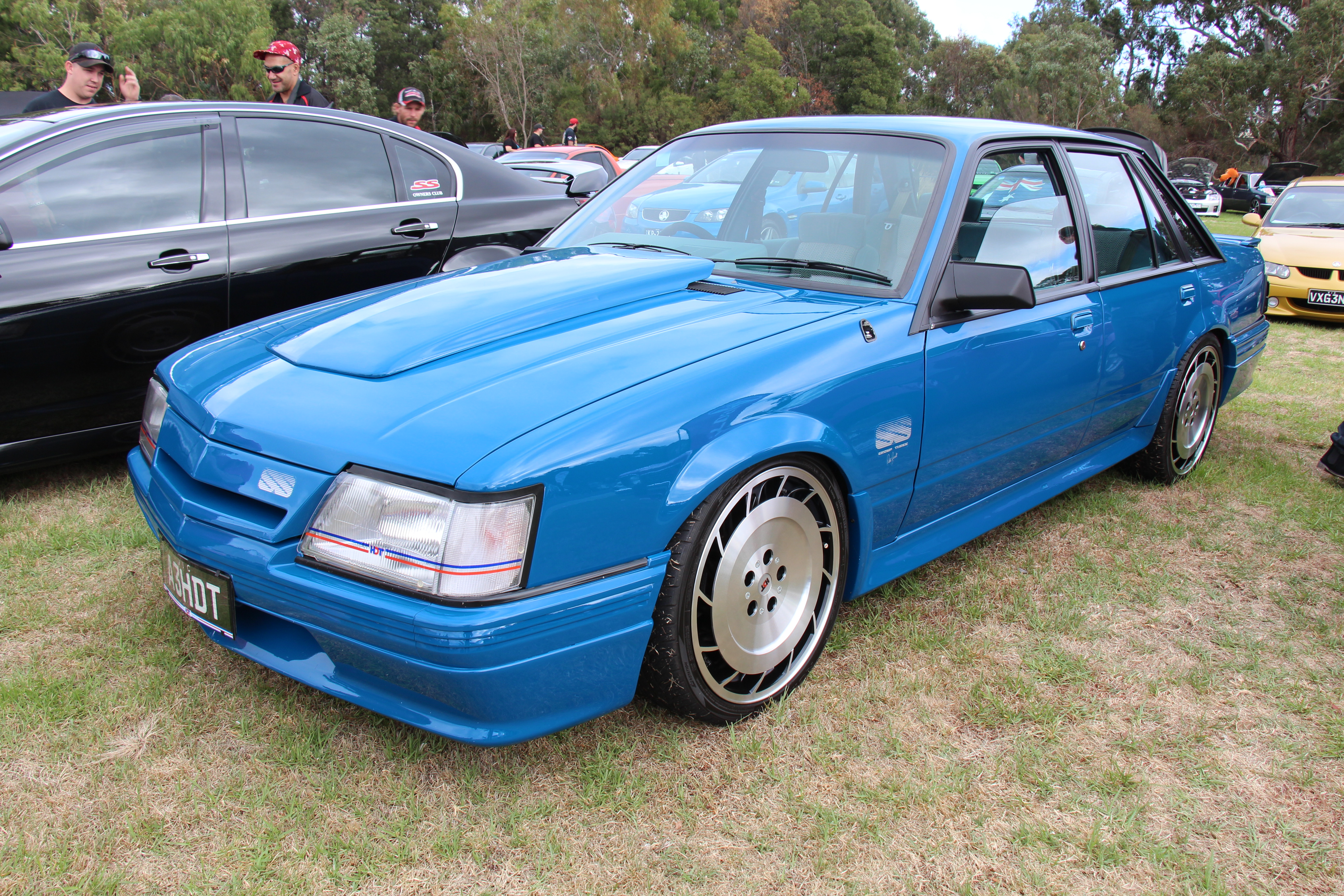
HDT Group 3 (177 kW based on Berlina)

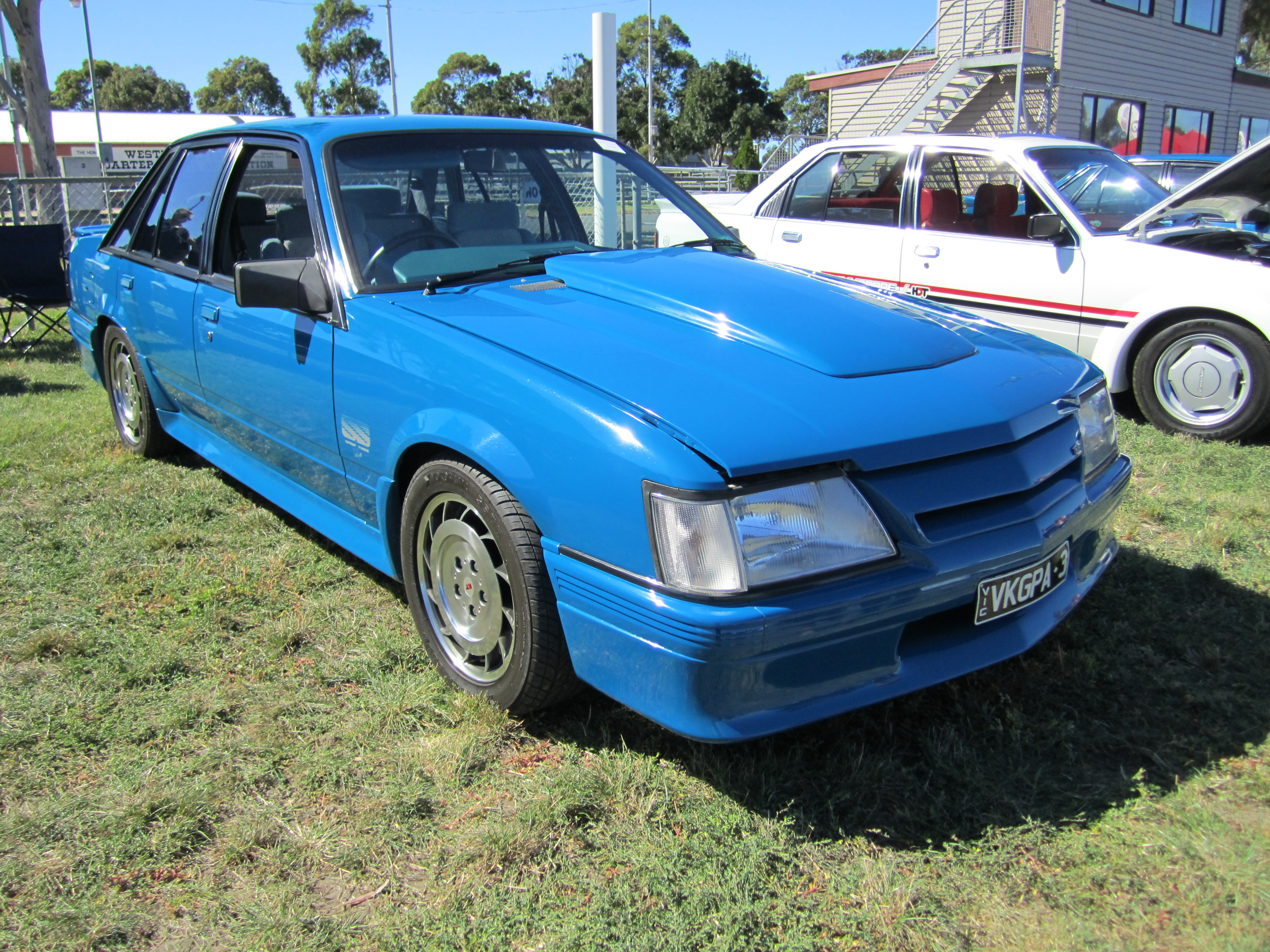
HDT Group A Group 3 (196 kW based on Berlina)

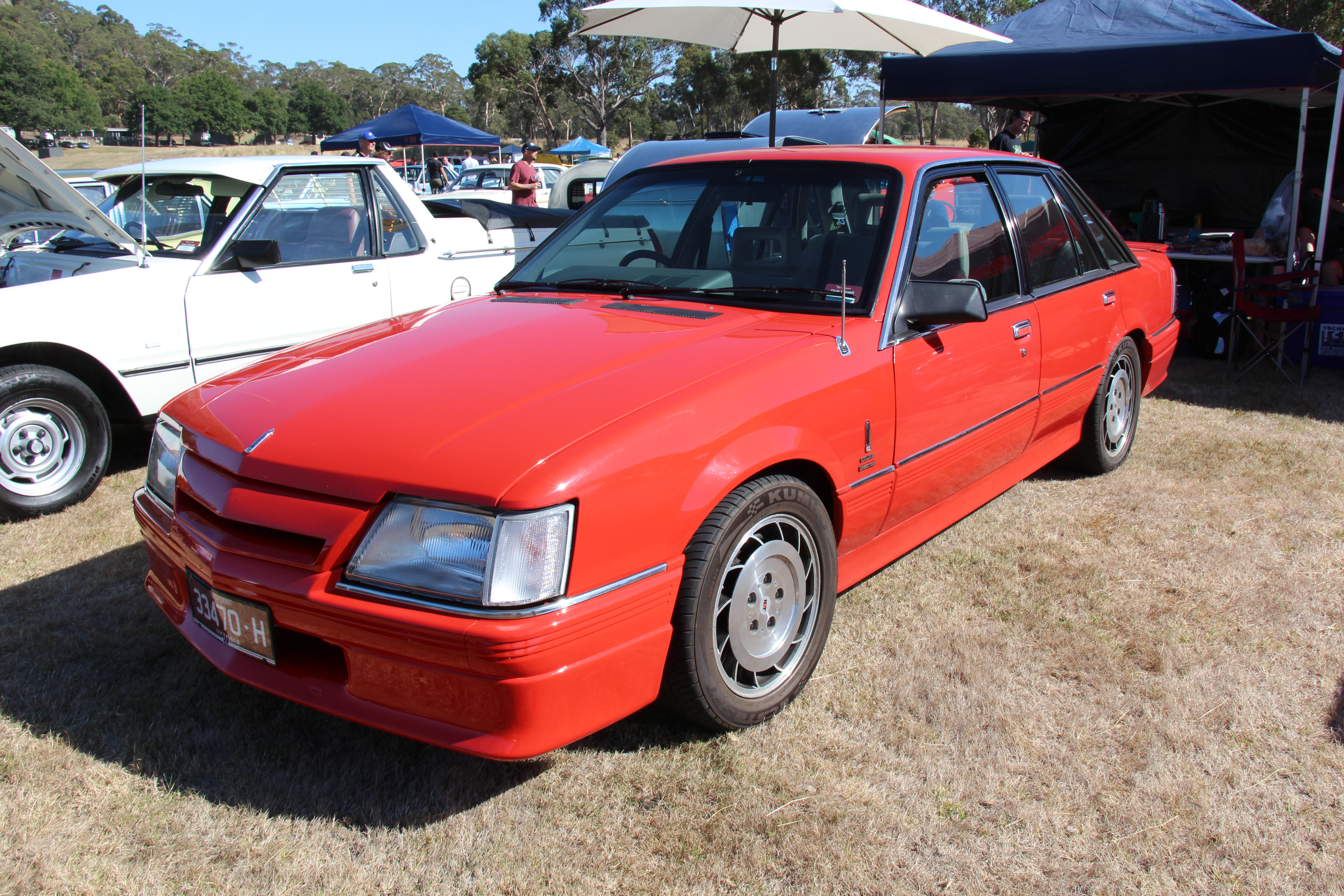
HDT Director (196 kW based on Calais)

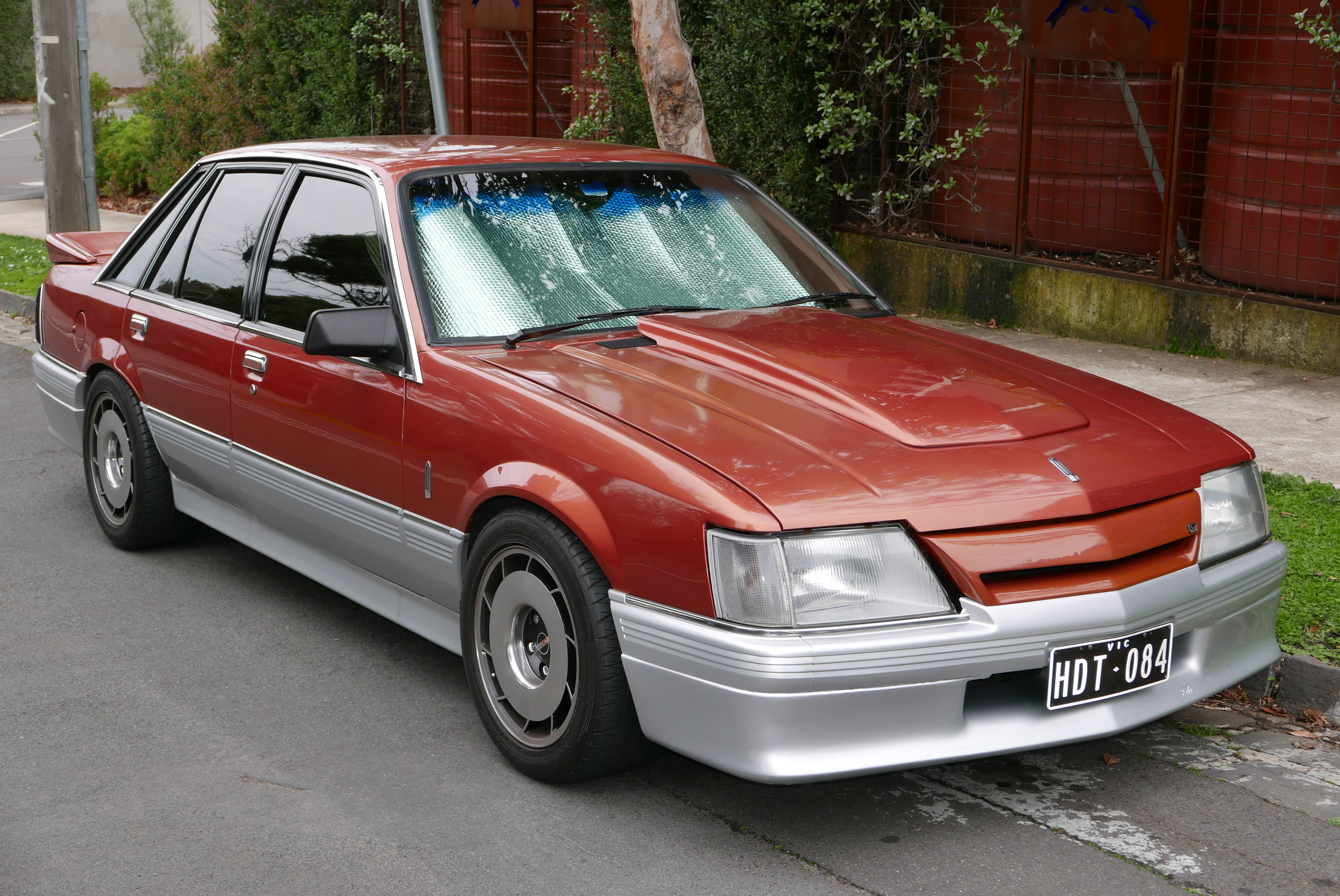
Holden Calais with HDT ADP upgrades

== New Zealand assembly ==
The VK was assembled by General Motors New Zealand at their Trentham assembly plant, near Wellington.

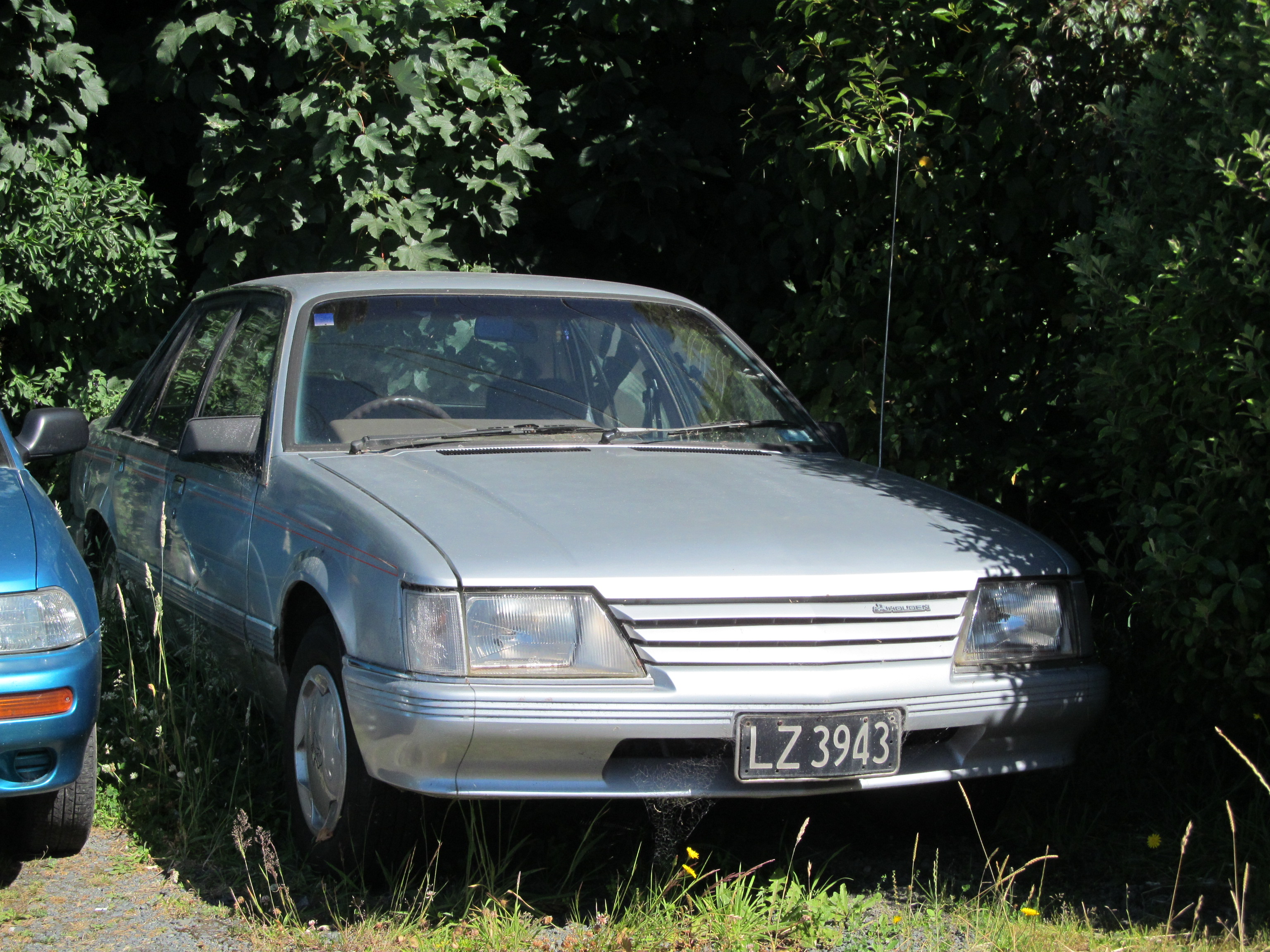
1985 Commodore Berlina (NZ assembled)

New Zealand VKs were similar, but had slight differences to their Australian sold counterparts, notably smoke-tinted taillights, the lack of emissions gear, and that a Holden Starfire-powered four-cylinder model was also available, utilizing 13-inch wheels which had a slightly smaller wheel stud pattern. The four-cylinder was considered an economic car; however, from its lack of power it tended to use more fuel than a six-cylinder model when laden down. It was however remarkably successful in this market, unlike in Australia, which is why GMNZ bought in a sizable stock of Starfire engines to use in assembling Commodore 4s after the engine was discontinued in Australia.

The four-cylinder was offered in SL, Berlina, and Royale (sedan only) trims and in combination with either the five-speed manual or the three-speed automatic transmission. The four-speed manual was not available on any New Zealand-assembled VKs. Positioned below the Calais, an upmarket model badged Commodore Royale was sold exclusively in New Zealand, available with both four- and six-cylinder engines. After the tax on engine displacement was removed in 1984, sales of larger-engined Holdens began to command a larger share of the market. The luxury options included with this was air conditioning, electric windows, central locking, electric mirrors, and velour upholstery. Small numbers of Calais and V8 Commodores were brought in fully built-up from Australia.

Towards the end of VK production in New Zealand, a limited run of 120 "GTS" sedans were produced. All featuring identical specs of 3.3 EFI engine, "Midnight Blue" paint with silver bumpers, 15-inch alloy wheels as per Royale/Calais, a unique "Cerulean Blue" interior with same cloth as VK SS Group A, black rubber boot spoiler, black Momo steering wheel, GTS badging, and red pinstripe. These cars may have also been fitted with FE2 suspension.

== SS Group A ==
The Commodore SS Group A was heavily modified by Holden's official performance tuner, originally the Holden Dealer Team. The SS Group A existed primarily as a homologation special, created specifically so a racing optimised version of the Commodore could be utilised for Group A touring car motor racing. The regulations set down by the international governing body FISA for Group A motor racing specified that a minimum of 5,000 base models (1,000 in Australia due to the smaller market) and 500 evolution models were to be built to a certain specification prior to said vehicle being allowed to compete. Group A regulations governed many touring car series at the 1980s and 1990s including series in Australia, New Zealand, Great Britain, Japan, Italy, Germany and the European Touring Car Championship as well as the one-off 1987 World Touring Car Championship. At the time, Group A was also the main category for a number of significant races such as Australia's own Bathurst 1000, the Spa 24 Hours at the famed Spa Grand Prix Circuit in Belgium, the RAC Tourist Trophy at Silverstone in England and the Guia Race at Macau. The Commodore SS Group A model run (starting with the VK) ran from 1985 until 1992. The four models have since become highly collectible amongst Holden and performance enthusiasts. Between August 1984 and early 1985, the less powerful 5044 cc SS Group Three was built.

Unique amongst all products produced by both the Holden Dealer Team and Holden Special Vehicles, these cars were referred to as Holdens, rather than as HDTs or HSVs.

As the first model to be produced (March 1985 – February 1986) represented Holden's increasing efforts in Group A racing. Available only in blue associated with the corporate colours of the Holden Dealer Team's principle sponsor Mobil, which gave rise to the cars nickname, the "Blue Meanie". Production began in early 1985, but part supply problems saw the HDT fail to build the required number of 500 and it missed the 1 August deadline for it to be eligible for racing that year. Production still continued and the VK SS Group A was available for motor racing from 1 January 1986. 502 cars were available only through Holden Dealer Team-affiliated Holden dealerships.

Visually the VK Group A SS had the addition of a rear spoiler, larger front air dam and a more aggressive front grille over the standard VK Commodore. Other changes included a double row timing chain (eliminating the car's inherent weakness of 1985, a single row chain), as well as stronger conrods and suspension mountings.

Power for the road going Group A SS with its 4.9-litre engine was rated at 196 kW (263 hp) at 5200 rpm, with a top speed of 215 km/h (134 mph). Transmission options were four-speed M21 manual, or optional five-speed Getrag T5. Although the T5G transmission was not an option with the VK Group A - some cars did get it fitted at the Bertie Street workshop by special arrangement with HDT, and in certain circumstances it was fitted by the dealer. The car was assembled at the Holden Dandenong Plant by Holden and modified at Bertie Street Port Melbourne by HDT.

=== Motor racing ===
==== Touring Cars ====
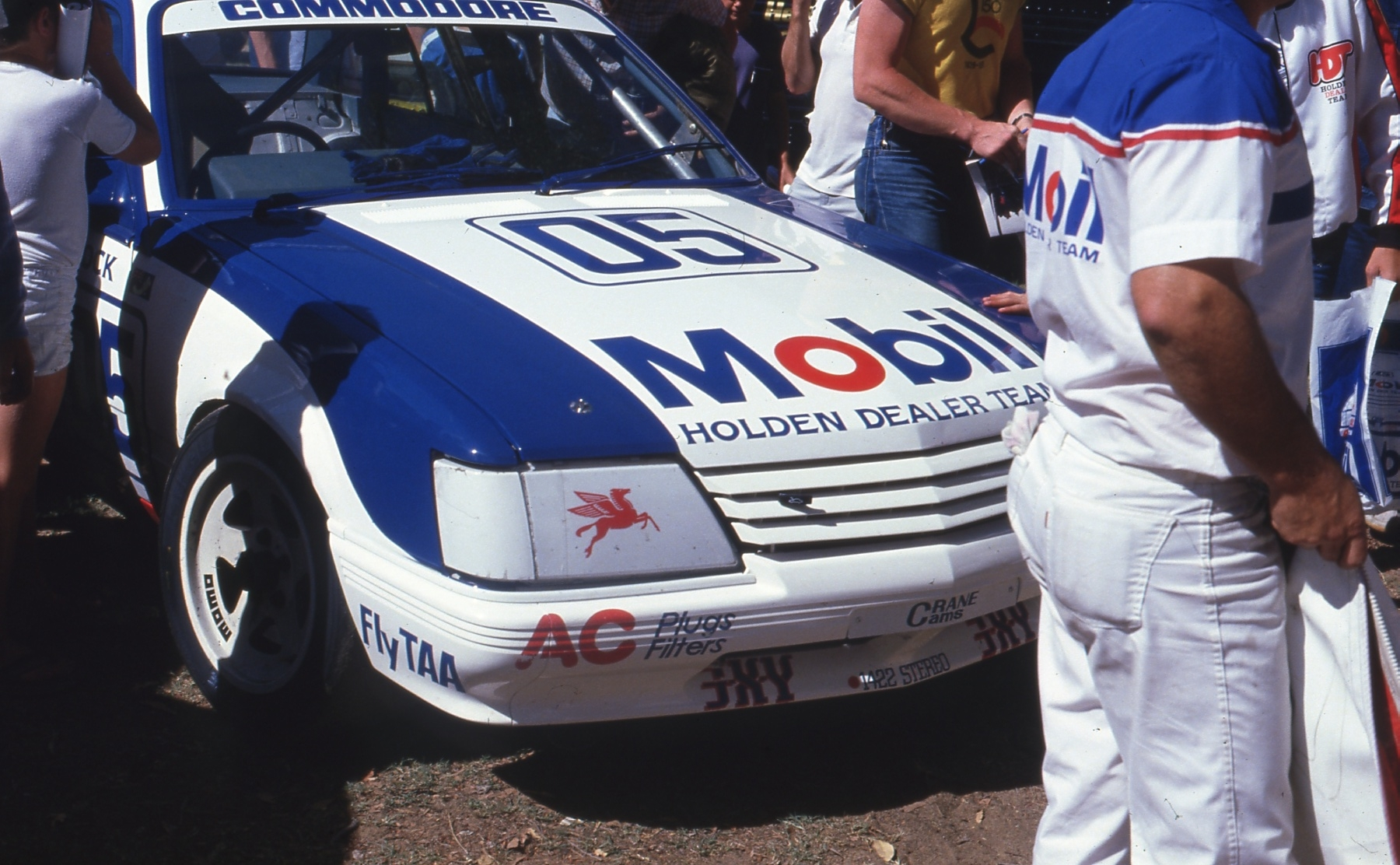
the near standard VK at Wanneroo 1985, raced by Peter Brock

The VK Group A SS Commodore was originally intended to be ready for racing in early 1985 to replace the near standard VK competitors had been forced to use. However, after virtually wasting 1984 on other pursuits including the HDT's ill-fated attempt at Le Mans which took up the focus in the first half of the year, then Holden's desire to send their Group C touring cars out with a win at Bathurst, left them little time to get the Commodore road cars ready to be homologated for Group A racing. This, plus delays in parts from suppliers meant that the HDT had not even begun to build the road going Group A cars to pass homologation on 1 January 1985, and did not have enough of them built to be homologated by the next FISA homologation date of 1 August which meant the new car would not be approved in time for that years Bathurst, although the Confederation of Australian Motorsport did relent and allow the Commodores to use the smaller 4.9L V8 in order to save some 175 kg (385.8 lb).

Peter Brock later recalled that after the 1985 James Hardie 1000, long time HDT driver and Brock's right-hand-man at the Special Vehicles operation John Harvey had remarked that their personal road cars (the SS Group A) were in fact faster and more reliable than the 1985 race cars.

As a comparison, the VK Commodores run by the HDT at the 1984 James Hardie 1000 under the old Group C regulations (which saw the cars have much larger wheels and large aerodynamic spoilers front and back) produced over 410 bhp (310 kW) and were recorded at 275 km/h (171 mph) on the 2 kilometres (1.2 mi) long Conrod Straight. The near standard 1985 Group A race cars only produced around 300 bhp (220 kW) and were recorded at 252 km/h (157 mph) on Conrod. This difference was also reflected in lap times with Peter Brock's fastest 1985 qualifying time being 8.811 seconds slower than he was in 1984.

In early 1986 the HDT gave the car a dream debut when Brock and new co-driver Allan Moffat won the Nissan Mobil 500 at the Wellington Street Circuit, while teammates Harvey and new team engineer/driver Neal Lowe won the Pukekohe 500 in the second race of the New Zealand series a week later. Of note, the two winning HDT Cars were not brand new SS Group A models, instead they were the teams 1985 Bathurst Commodores, upgraded to 1986 specifications.

The Holden Dealer Team then took two brand new cars to Europe for the 1986 FIA Touring Car Championship, one for Brock and Moffat, and the other saved for the Spa 24 Hours and be spare parts if needed. Brock and Moffat joined fellow Commodore privateers Allan Grice and Graeme Bailey in Europe, with Grice in particular proving to be a revelation in the Les Small (Roadways Racing) prepared VK, qualifying well and leading a number of races at Monza, Donington Park (where both Brock and Grice led) and Hockenheim. In his dice for the lead at Hockenheim with the factory backed Volvo 240T's of reigning ETCC champion Thomas Lindström and former Formula One driver Johnny Cecotto, Grice set the touring car lap record for the 6.823-kilometre (4.240 mi) circuit that wasn't broken until 2000, the year before the old track was re-configured into a shorter, more technical circuit.

At Spa for the 24-hour race, with the HDT running their two cars and teaming with the Roadways Commodore of Grice, and after problems including two blown head gaskets in the number 05 car (the same problem had happened when the HDT did a pre-Spa test over 24 hours at Calder Park), an early lost wheel and later a broken seat for Grice caused by his oversized co-driver, Belgian Jeweler Michel Delcourt (the Roadways team reported that the HDT refused to lend them a spare seat during the race, forcing them to borrow one from the retired TWR Rovers), and no oil pressure for the second HDT car at the end of the race, the two teams claimed the prestigious Kings Cup prize. The second HDT car, driven by New Zealanders Lowe (the team engineer and endurance co-driver for Harvey), Kent Baigent and Graeme Bowkett finished 18th outright. The Brock/Moffat/Harvey car finished 22nd while Grice, Delcourt and Belgian Alex Guyaux finished 23rd.

In Australia the Group A Commodore became the car of choice for many privateers in the ATCC with the HDT and ex-Grand Prix motorcycle racing star, wise-cracking Kiwi Graeme Crosby being front runners. Brock's former HDT co-driver Larry Perkins set up Perkins Engineering, which would eventually build customer Commodores for privateers, appeared with his own VK SS Group A in time for the Sandown 500. Peter Brock gave the car its first Australian win by winning Round 6 of the series at Surfers Paradise in what was the last win by a Commodore in the ATCC until Brock won the opening heat of Round 1 of the 1992 championship at Sydney's Amaroo Park. Despite his European campaign Brock managed to finish 4th in the 1986 ATCC being the only Holden round winner.

Better was to come for the Commodore in the endurance races with Grice and Bailey winning the 1986 James Hardie 1000 at Bathurst from the HDT pair of John Harvey and Neal Lowe, with Grice becoming the first driver to lap the Mt. Panorama circuit at over 100 mph (160 km/h) in a Group A Touring Car when he was timed at 2:16.16 for the 6.172-kilometre (3.835 mi) circuit in qualifying (Grice had also been the first to lap Bathurst at over 100 mph in a Group C touring car in 1982 with a time of 2:17.8, on that occasion driving a VH Commodore SS). Grice then went on to win the Group A support race at the 1986 Australian Grand Prix in Adelaide, which doubled as the second round of the 1986 South Pacific Touring Car Championship,.

The HDT and Roadways teams also sent their Commodores to Fuji in Japan for the 1986 Fuji 500. Brock and Moffat were out after 94 laps, while the Grice/Crosby car was running third with only a few laps left when another lost wheel saw them slip to fifth place at the finish. Early on in the race Brock had battled for the lead with Tom Walkinshaw and Jeff Allam in their TWR Jaguar XJ-S V12's which had been brought to Japan despite not having raced since winning the 1985 James Hardie 1000.

While the top-level teams such as HDT and Roadways (Grice) moved to the VL model Commodore in early 1987, a number of private teams, including Larry Perkins, who claimed his was the fastest Commodore in the world until forced to switch to the VL after crashing at Bathurst, continued to use the VK due to the increasing costs of running the newer cars with VK's last seen in the ATCC in 1990.

Driving his Lansvale Racing Team Commodore, Sydney based privateer Trevor Ashby gave the VK Group A SS its last major race win when he won Heat 2 of Round 1 of the 1987 AMSCAR series at Amaroo Park on 27 March 1987.

==== AUSCAR ====
The VK Commodore (with SS Group A bodywork including the single slot front grille) was also a popular choice in Bob Jane's AUSCAR racing category which began in 1987. As per AUSCAR rules, the Commodores used the 5.0-litre Holden V8 engine, though they were also permitted to use the Group A developed 4.9-litre V8 if they so desired. However, unlike in Group A racing the reduction in engine size would not see a reduction to the cars minimum weight in AUSCAR. Shocking the male establishment, 18-year-old female driver Terri Sawyer won the first ever AUSCAR race, the AUSCAR 200, at the $54 million Calder Park Thunderdome in Melbourne driving a VK Commodore.

==== Endurance racing ====
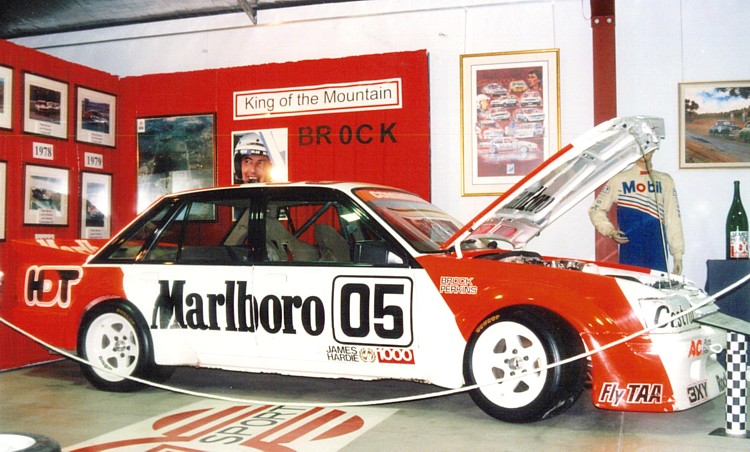
The Holden VK Commodore in which Peter Brock and Larry Perkins won the 1984 James Hardie 1000 at Bathurst

The VK Commodore won the Bathurst 1000 on two occasions, in 1984 in Group C specification with Peter Brock and Larry Perkins, and in 1986 in Group A specification with Allan Grice and Graeme Bailey. Brock had two further wins with the Group C car, sharing with Perkins to win the 1984 Castrol 500 at Sandown prior to Bathurst, and a solo drive to win the Motorcraft 300 at the Surfers Paradise International Raceway in November 1984 following Bathurst.

In Group A racing, Brock and Allan Moffat gave the Group A SS model a dream debut by winning the 1986 Wellington 500 street race in New Zealand while team drivers John Harvey and Neal Lowe drove their Commodore to win the 1986 Pukekohe 500 at the Pukekohe Park Raceway.

Brock and Moffat repeated their 1986 Wellington win by winning the 1987 race while the VK's last endurance win was when Perkins and 1967 Formula One World Champion Denny Hulme won the 1987 Pukekohe 500.
