= 1986 Australian Touring Car Championship =

Motor racing competition

Seasons
- ← 1985 1987 →

The 1986 Australian Touring Car Championship was an Australian motor racing competition for Touring Cars. It began on 2 March 1986 at Amaroo Park and ended on 13 July at Oran Park Raceway after ten rounds. The championship was authorised by the Confederation of Australian Motor Sport (CAMS) as an Australian National Title. It was the 27th Australian Touring Car Championship and the second to be contested by cars conforming with CAMS regulations based on the FIA's international Group A Touring Car regulations.

The championship was won by Robbie Francevic driving a Volvo 240.

== Season summary ==
The championship was won by Auckland (New Zealand) resident Robbie Francevic driving a Volvo Dealer Team Volvo 240T, the first time the championship had been won by a non-Australian resident and the first ATCC won by a turbocharged car. Francevic, who won Rounds 1, 2 and 4, defeated George Fury driving a Nissan Skyline DR30 RS who won Rounds 3, 5, 7, 8 and 10 of the series. Francevic's wins in the opening two rounds at Amaroo Park and Symmons Plains were when the Volvo team was still run by MPM, Mark Petch Motorsport. Following Francevic's Amaroo win, Petch and Bob Atkins, head of the Australian Volvo Dealer Council, announced the formation of the AVDT, Australian Volvo Dealer Team, and hired former HDT team manager John Sheppard to run the team on a day-to-day basis from Sheppard's Calder workshop.

Contrary to what has been written in the past, Petch stayed involved as "Team Principal" until 10 July 1986, when he then resigned over a disagreement with how Sheppard was managing the Team. The AVDT purchased the original MPM 240T GpA car, and spares, which included a bare 240 body shell that later became the basis for a new Australian-built car, with new parts and technical assistance sourced from VMS. Francevic's 1985 endurance co-driver and dual Australian Drivers' Champion John Bowe joining the team full-time for his first ATCC campaign, in the team's new second car, a RHD car ex RAS in Belgium, which arrived just in time for the 4th round of the ATCC at Adelaide International Raceway, where Bowe qualified second with Francevic back in 10th, though Robbie would win the race after runaway early leader Brock holed a piston in the Holden V8 engine and then lost his fastest lap due to driving into the pits via the exit and driving the wrong way to his pit box. Bowe grabbed his first Championship Pole position at the 5th round of the Champion at Barbagallo Raceway, only to have to retire again from a substantial lead when the cars engine management system started playing up. Peter Brock won round 6 at Surfers Paradise in his new for 1986 Holden VK Commodore SS Group A (his last ATCC win until 1989 and the last race win by a Holden Commodore until his win in Round 1, Heat 1 of the 1992 ATCC) while defending champion Jim Richards could only manage one win in his JPS Team BMW 635 CSi, winning Round 9 at Winton. Richards had finished the race in second place behind Nissan team driver Gary Scott, but the Nissan was later disqualified for having oversize brakes. Although the paperwork for the Nissan's new brakes had been put through, they had not yet been homologated which led to Scott's DQ.

Series regular Allan Grice missed the 1986 ATCC (he had also missed the inaugural Group A 1985 championship) as he was racing a Les Small prepared Holden Commodore in the 1986 FIA Touring Car Championship (ETCC). Peter Brock also missed some early rounds of the ATCC due to his racing an HDT Commodore in Europe in company with Allan Moffat.

With the ATCC consisting of 10 rounds, many of the top level teams including the Holden Dealer Team, Dick Johnson Racing, JPS Team BMW and the Peter Jackson Nissan team all made loud noises during the year about the lack of prize money on offer for their efforts as the top drawing motorsport category in the country, especially as Group A racing had proven far more expensive than the old Group C regulations (Peter Brock estimated that his Bathurst winning Group C Commodore of 1984 had cost around AU$36,000 to build while his 1986 Group A Commodore had cost around $200,000, a cost increase of around 550%), with teams and drivers often racing for as little as $1,500 for a round win. Part of the problem for the teams was that due to Australia's size and the vast distance between the major cities where the race tracks were located, the prize money on offer usually did not even cover their transportation costs, let alone the cost of building, maintaining and racing the cars. Pressure was being put on the Confederation of Australian Motor Sport (CAMS) to come up with a series sponsor for future championships or they would risk smaller and smaller grids. CAMS rectified this from 1987 by signing a multi-year sponsorship deal with Shell who would provide some $275,000 in prize money.

== Entrants and drivers ==
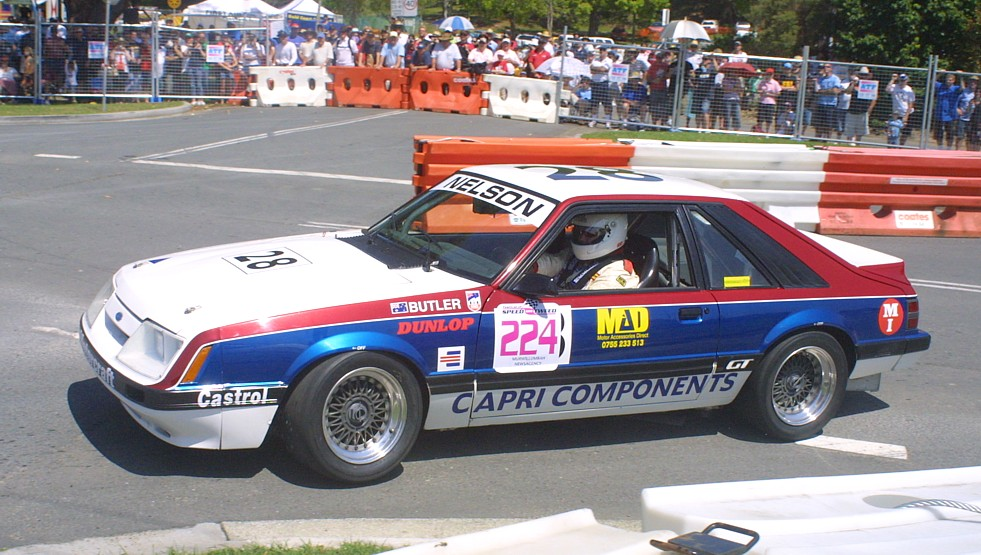
Lawrie Nelson's Ford Mustang

The following entrants and drivers competed in the championship.

Entrant	Car model	No	Driver
JPS Team BMW	BMW 635CSi	1	(New Zealand) Jim Richards
JPS Team BMW	BMW 325i	23	(Australia) Garry Rogers
JPS Team BMW	BMW 325i	25	(Australia) Tony Longhurst
Chickadee Racing	Holden VK Commodore SS Group A	2	(Australia) Graeme Bailey
Graeme Crosby	Holden VK Commodore SS Group A	2; 6; 20	(New Zealand) Graeme Crosby
Mobil Holden Dealer Team	Holden VK Commodore SS Group A	3	(Australia) John Harvey
Mobil Holden Dealer Team	Holden VK Commodore SS Group A	05	(Australia) Peter Brock (New Zealand) Neal Lowe
Peter McLeod	Holden VK Commodore SS Group A	4	(Australia) Peter McLeod
Volvo Dealer Team	Volvo 240T	4; 44	(Australia) John Bowe
Volvo Dealer Team	Volvo 240T	10	(New Zealand) Robbie Francevic
Charlie O'Brien	BMW 635CSi	7	(Australia) Charlie O'Brien
Charlie O'Brien	BMW 635CSi	22	(Australia) Gregg Hansford
Terry Finnigan	Holden VK Commodore SS Group A	8	(Australia) Terry Finnigan
Kevin Bartlett	Mitsubishi Starion	9	(Australia) Kevin Bartlett
Mark Petch Motorsport	Volvo 240T	10	(New Zealand) Robbie Francevic
Toyota Team Australia	Toyota Corolla GT AE86	11	(Australia) Drew Price
Toyota Team Australia	Toyota Corolla FX-GT AE82	16	(Australia) John Smith
Garry Willmington Performance	Jaguar XJS	12	(Australia) Garry Willmington
Simon Emmerling	BMW 635CSi	12	(Australia) Simon Emmerling
Bob Holden Motors	Toyota Sprinter	13	(Australia) Bob Holden
Peter Jackson Nissan Racing	Nissan Skyline DR30 RS	15	(Australia) Glenn Seton (Australia) Gary Scott
Peter Jackson Nissan Racing	Nissan Skyline DR30 RS	30	(Australia) George Fury
Palmer Tube Mills	Ford Mustang	17	(Australia) Dick Johnson
Ken Mathews Prestige Cars	Holden VK Commodore SS Group A	19	(Australia) Ken Mathews
Jim Keogh Automotive	BMW 635CSi	20	(Australia) Jim Keogh
Lusty Engineering	Holden VK Commodore SS Group A	23	(Australia) Graham Lusty
Jagparts Racing	Holden VK Commodore SS Group A	24	(Australia) Gerald Kay
Alf Grant Racing	Holden VK Commodore SS Group A	27	(Australia) Alf Grant
Mike Freeman	Toyota Celica RA40	27	(Australia) Mike Freeman
Capri Components	Ford Mustang	28	(Australia) Lawrie Nelson
Yellow Pages	Holden VK Commodore SS Group A	28	(Australia) Tony Kavich
Ken Davison	Ford Mustang	29	(Australia) Wally Kramer
Mike Burgmann	Holden VK Commodore SS Group A	33	(Australia) Mike Burgmann
Garry Rogers Motorsport	BMW 635CSi	34	(Australia) Garry Rogers
Lester Smerdon	Holden VK Commodore SS Group A	35	(Australia) Geoff Russell (Australia) Lester Smerdon
Murray Carter	Nissan Skyline DR30 RS	36	(Australia) Murray Carter (Australia) Bill O'Brien
Grellis Marketing	Holden VK Commodore SS Group A	38	(Australia) Ray Ellis
Motor Sport Pacific	Ford Sierra XR4Ti	40	(New Zealand) David Oxton
Motor Sport Pacific	Ford Escort RS1600i	55	(New Zealand) Andrew Bagnall
Brian Callaghan	Holden VK Commodore SS Group A	47	(Australia) Brian Callaghan
John Donnelly	Rover Vitesse	50	(Australia) John Donnelly
BJ Motorsport	Mitsubishi Starion	53	(Australia) Brad Jones
David Ratcliff	Toyota Corolla	58	(Australia) David Ratcliff
John Giddings	Nissan Gazelle	60	(Australia) John Giddings
John White	Isuzu Gemini ZZ	65	(Australia) John White
Graeme Hooley	Holden VK Commodore SS Group A	71	(Australia) Graeme Hooley
John Major	Mazda RX-7	74	(Australia) Tim Howton
Network Alfa	Alfa Romeo Alfetta GTV6	75	(Australia) Colin Bond
Peter Williamson Toyota	Toyota Celica Supra	77	(Australia) Peter Williamson
Melbourne Brake & Clutch	Mitsubishi Starion	78	(Australia) Brian Sampson
Daryl Hendrick	Isuzu Gemini ZZ	86	(Australia) Daryl Hendrick
Brian Bolwell	BMW 323i	87	(Australia) Brian Bolwell
Auto Art	Ford Mustang	91	(Australia) Kevin Clark
Alf Barbagallo	Rover Vitesse	96	(New Zealand) Tim Slako

== Results and standings ==
=== Race calendar ===
The championship was contested over ten rounds with one race per round.

Rd.	Race title	Circuit	City / state	Date	Winner	Team	Report
1	Better Brakes 100	Amaroo Park	Sydney, New South Wales	1 - 2 Mar	Robbie Francevic	Mark Petch Motorsport	
2	A.N.L. Cup	Symmons Plains Raceway	Launceston, Tasmania	8 - 9 Mar	Robbie Francevic	Mark Petch Motorsport	
3	Castrol Challenge	Sandown International Raceway	Melbourne, Victoria	12 - 13 Apr	George Fury	Peter Jackson Nissan Racing	
4	Motorcraft 100	Adelaide International Raceway	Adelaide, South Australia	26 - 27 Apr	Robbie Francevic	Volvo Dealer Team	
5	Motorcraft 100	Wanneroo Park	Perth, Western Australia	5–6 May	George Fury	Peter Jackson Nissan Racing	
6	XXXX 100	Surfers Paradise Raceway	Surfers Paradise, Queensland	17–18 May	Peter Brock	Mobil Holden Dealer Team	
7	Coca-Cola Cup	Calder Park Raceway	Melbourne, Victoria	31 May - 1 Jun	George Fury	Peter Jackson Nissan Racing	
8	Motorcraft 100	Lakeside International Raceway	Brisbane, Queensland	14 - 15 Jun	George Fury	Peter Jackson Nissan Racing	
9	Lusty-Allison Winton Roundup	Winton Motor Raceway	Benalla, Victoria	28 - 29 Jun	Jim Richards	JPS Team BMW	
10	Castrol Grand Final	Oran Park Raceway	Sydney, New South Wales	12 - 13 Jul	George Fury	Peter Jackson Nissan Racing	

=== Drivers championship ===
Points were awarded 25-23-20-17-15-13-11-10-9-8-7-6-4-3-2-1 based on the top 17 outright race positions. The two smaller engine capacity classes received bonus points. Class B, under 3.0 litres received 3 points additional to points scored from race position. Class C, under 2.0 litres received 4 points.

Class A consisted of BMW 635 CSi, Ford Mustang GT, Ford Sierra XR4Ti, Holden VK Commodore SS Group A, Jaguar XJS, Rover Vitesse.

Class B consisted of Alfa Romeo GTV6, BMW 323i, BMW 325i, Mazda RX-7, Mitsubishi Starion Turbo, Nissan Skyline DR30 RS, Toyota Supra and Volvo 240T.

Class C consisted of Isuzu Gemini ZZ, Nissan Gazelle, Toyota Celica and Toyota Corolla.

Pos	Driver	Ama	Sym	San	Ade	Wan	Sur	Cal	Lak	Win	Ora	Pts
1	Robbie Francevic	1st	1st	2nd	1st	3rd	2nd	Ret	4th	3rd	6th	217
2	George Fury	Ret	2nd	1st	Ret	1st	4th	1st	1st	2nd	1st	212
3	Jim Richards	2nd	6th	Ret	10th	4th	3rd	7th	5th	1st	5th	147
4	Peter Brock	5th	Ret		DSQ	12th	1st	5th	3rd	6th	2nd	117
5	Tony Longhurst	3rd	7th	8th	7th	7th	6th	12th	Ret	Ret	8th	115
6	Dick Johnson	4th	5th	Ret	6th	5th	10th	8th	7th	8th	7th	110
7	Graeme Crosby	Ret	4th	12th	2nd	6th	Ret	4th	9th	7th	12th	102
8	John Bowe				4th	Ret	9th	3rd	DNS	4th	3rd	98
9	Colin Bond	Ret		4th	13th	8th		10th		5th	Ret	69
10	Glenn Seton			14th	Ret	2nd	13th	2nd				67
11	John Harvey	Ret	3rd	6th	5th	Ret		6th				61
12	Charlie O'Brien	6th	Ret		3rd		5th		10th			56
13	Graeme Bailey	Ret					7th	9th	6th		4th	50
14	Garry Rogers	Ret	8th	Ret	9th			11th	8th	DNS	DNS	39
15	John Smith		9th		15th			15th			14th	35
16	Murray Carter			7th				14th		9th		33
17	David Oxton						11th	13th	11th	Ret	DNS	28
18	Gary Scott								2nd	DSQ		26
19	Peter McLeod			5th							9th	25
19	Bob Holden	11th			16th			19th			17th	25
21	Graeme Hooley	10th			18th	10th					11th	23
22	Alf Grant	8th					12th		13th			21
23	Neal Lowe			3rd								20
24	Gerald Kay	12th		13th				Ret		8th		19
24	Graham Lusty			10th	14th		Ret			11th		19
26	Brad Jones				8th							13
27	Mike Burgmann	7th										11
27	Drew Price				17th			16th				11
27	David Ratcliff				19th			17th			19th	11
30	Gregg Hansford						8th					10
30	Brian Sampson				10th			Ret		Ret		10
30	Lawrie Nelson			11th				Ret		15th		10
33	Brian Callaghan	9th										9
33	Jim Keogh			9th								9
33	Tim Slako					9th						9
33	Peter Williamson	DNS		Ret	12th		Ret				DNS	9
37	Tony Kavich										10th	8
37	Tim Howton					13th						8
37	Brian Bolwell									13th		8
37	Bill O'Brien										13th	8
37	Andrew Bagnall						14th					8
37	Mike Freeman									14th		8
43	Simon Emmerling					11th						7
44	Lester Smerdon								12th			6
44	Ray Ellis									12th		6
44	John Giddings										16th	6
44	John White				20th			18th				6
48	Ken Mathews	13th									18th	5
49	Kevin Clark								14th			4
50	Garry Willmington	Ret							15th		Ret	3
50	Wally Kramer										15th	3
52	Darryl Hendrick				21st			20th				2
Pos	Driver	Ama	Sym	San	Ade	Wan	Sur	Cal	Lak	Win	Ora	Pts

Colour	Result
Gold	Winner
Silver	Second place
Bronze	Third place
Green	Points classification
Blue	Non-points classification
Blue	Non-classified finish (NC)
Purple	Retired, not classified (Ret)
Red	Did not qualify (DNQ)
Red	Did not pre-qualify (DNPQ)
Black	Disqualified (DSQ)
White	Did not start (DNS)
White	Withdrew (WD)
White	Race cancelled (C)
Blank	Did not practice (DNP)
Blank	Did not arrive (DNA)
Blank	Excluded (EX)

== See also ==
1986 Australian Touring Car season
