= Volvo Dealer Team =

- Manufacturer: Volvo
- Team Manager: John Sheppard
- Race Drivers: Robbie Francevic; John Bowe; Alfredo Costanzo; Graham McRae; Neville Crichton
- Chassis: 240T
- Debut: 1986
- Drivers' Championships: 1
- 1st (Francevic); 8th Bowe

The Volvo Dealer Team was an Australian motor racing team that competed in Australian touring car racing in 1986 winning the Australian Touring Car Championship.

== History ==
Robbie Francevic won the opening round of the opening two rounds of the 1986 Australian Touring Car Championship, driving a Mark Petch Motorsport Volvo 240T. The team was then sold to Volvo Australia and rebranded as the Volvo Dealer Team with former Holden Dealer Team manager John Sheppard appointed to lead the team. A second car was added for John Bowe from round four.

Francevic would go on to win the championship but simmering tensions between Francevic and Sheppard would boil over at the Sandown 500 with Francevic sacked. At the end of 1986, Volvo withdrew from global motorsport resulting in the team being disbanded and the cars sent to Sweden.
