= Bob Jane T-Marts =

Australian tyre store chain franchise

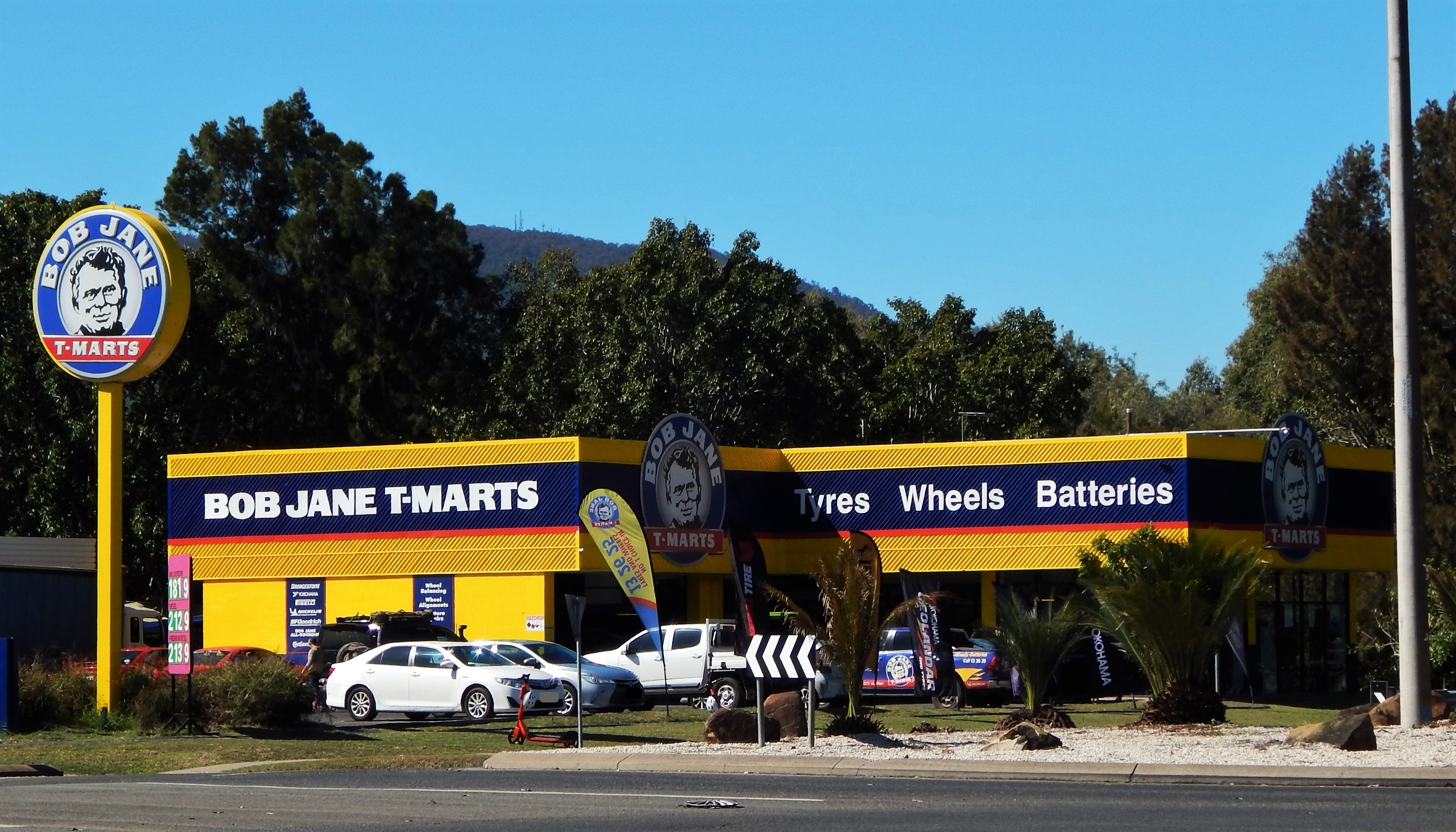
- A Bob Jane T-Marts store in Rockhampton, 2022
- Type: Private
- Industry: Automotive
- Founded: 1965
- Founder: Bob Jane
- Headquarters: Melbourne, Australia
- Area served: Australia
- Key people: Rodney Jane (CEO)
- Products: Tyres
- Website: Bobjane.com.au/

Bob Jane T-Marts is a chain of tyre stores founded by former race car driver Bob Jane in Melbourne, Victoria, Australia in 1965. The company has grown to encompass over 100 franchises across Australia.

== Overview ==
The company remains an independent, family-owned business to this day with Bob's son, Joshua Weatherby, the current CEO. However, in 2011 the then 82-year-old Bob Jane resigned as chairman of Bob Jane T-Marts citing difficulties in the relationship with his son. Bob Jane would later attempt to establish another tyre business using his name, but was blocked by his son in court.

Bob Jane T-Marts is the only major tyre retailer in Australia which does not sell retread tyres. Bob Jane's personal reason for this is that his second eldest daughter, Georgina, had died in a car crash in 1991 due to a retreaded tyre blowing out.

The company's head office is located at 471 Williamstown Road, Port Melbourne.

== Sponsorships ==
From 2002 to 2004, Bob Jane T-Marts held the naming rights sponsorship for the Bathurst 1000, the race Jane dominated early in his career. The company also held the naming rights to what was then known as the Bob Jane Stadium, now known as Lakeside Stadium in Albert Park, Victoria home of South Melbourne FC.

== See also ==
- List of tire companies
