= 1984 Australian Touring Car Championship =

Motor racing competition

Seasons
- ← 1983 1985 →

The 1984 Australian Touring Car Championship was a motor racing competition for Group C Touring Cars. The Championship was authorised by the Confederation of Australian Motor Sport as an Australian National Title. It was the 25th Australian Touring Car Championship, and the last to be contested by Group C cars as new regulations, based on international Group A, were introduced for 1985.

The championship, which began on 18 February 1984 at Sandown Raceway and ended on 1 July at Adelaide International Raceway after seven rounds, was won by Dick Johnson driving a Ford XE Falcon.

== Television Coverage ==
The 1984 ATCC saw the ABC televise each round of the series live throughout Australia. It was the first time that one television station had covered the entire series, previously the ABC and Channel 7 had shared the broadcast rights. It would be the last time the ABC covered the ATCC as Seven took over from 1985 when the locally developed Group C rules were replaced by the FIA's International Group A touring car regulations. The commentators for the ABC telecasts were Will Hagon and John Smailes with Tim Lane, Neil Crompton, Bob Vincent, Bob Morris and Allan Grice joining them at selected rounds.

== Season summary ==
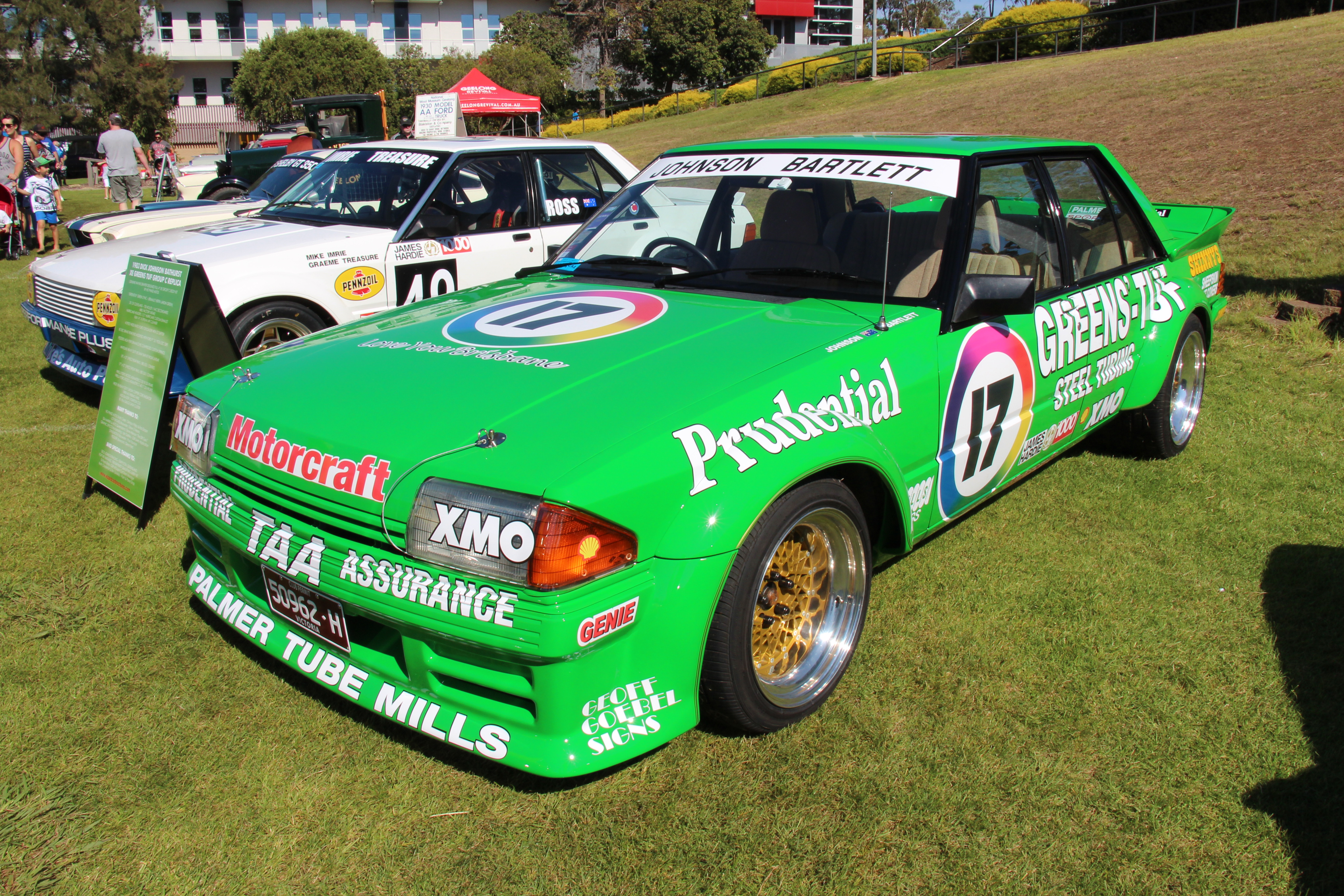
A replica of the Ford Falcon XE driven by championship winner Dick Johnson

Johnson's win gave Ford and its Falcon both the first and last ATCC wins under Group C regulations as Allan Moffat won the 1973 ATCC in a Falcon XY GTHO Phase III. The win was also Ford's 12th ATCC win since the championship began in 1960 and the Falcon's 6th win overall after having previously won in 1973, 1976, 1977 (all Moffat), 1981 and 1982 (both Johnson). Given that a Falcon did not contest the championship from 1985 to 1992, it was also the last championship win for a Falcon driver until 1993.

1984 saw the first ever ATCC race win by a turbocharged car when George Fury won the 6th round at a wet Lakeside Raceway just north of Brisbane driving a Nissan Bluebird Turbo.

Peter Brock, driving a Marlboro Holden Dealer Team entered Holden Commodore, was the only driver to win more than once, with victories in the opening rounds at Sandown and Symmons Plains. Johnson's only win in the series was at the 4th round at Surfers Paradise, though he never finished lower than 3rd in any other round. Allan Grice won the last round at Adelaide (his last ever ATCC race win), and thus the distinction of winning the last ATCC race run under Group C rules. Defending champion Allan Moffat only won one round of the series, at Wanneroo Park (also his last ATCC race win), and suffered a crash at Surfers Paradise in which he not only wrote off his Mazda RX-7, but also broke bones in his right hand and suffered a fractured sternum, forcing him out of the series (in fact, Moffat would not appear in another ATCC race until round 4 of the 1988 series at Wanneroo). The only other winner was former champion Bob Morris who introduced some flavour to the series when he made a comeback to the sport in 1984, winning Round 5 at Oran Park in an RX-7 fitted with a standard gearbox after the team's only race unit was broken in practice. Holden Commodore driver Warren Cullen finished 4th in the championship and was the only driver other than Dick Johnson to finish every round of the series.

Unfortunately for the final ATCC run under the local Group C rules, with the exception of Dick Johnson, Jim Richards contesting his first ATCC in his JPS Team BMW 635 CSi, Warren Cullen's two car Commodore team backed by K-Mart with new teammate Andrew Harris in his 1982 and 1983 Bathurst winning ex-HDT Commodore, and 1983 Australian Endurance Champion Peter McLeod in his Slick 50 Mazda RX-7, the series was devoid of many of its big name drivers from mid-season. Peter Brock missed both Queensland rounds due to his commitment to race a Porsche 956 with his Bathurst winning co-driver Larry Perkins at the 1000 km of Silverstone and 24 Hours of Le Mans races and was substituted in both races by teammate John Harvey having his first ATCC drive since 1979. After the Roadways Racing team lost their STP sponsorship (though still running a single car for Steve Harrington), Allan Grice struggled to find enough sponsorship other than SAAS Wheels to run his rented Roadways Commodore for the entire series and missed most of the mid-season rounds, during which time he drove the ex-Bob Jane DeKon Chevrolet Monza (now owned by Re-Car's Allan Browne) on his way to winning the Australian GT Championship, and he also drove at Le Mans in a Porsche 956 (he also joined the television commentary team for Surfers Paradise). George Fury was also missing mid-season when Nissan team boss Howard Marsden decided to concentrate on car development following a couple of non-finishes, while reigning champion Moffat missed the last three rounds of the series through injury.

== Teams and drivers ==
The following teams and drivers competed in the 1984 Australian Touring Car Championship.

Team	Car	No	Driver
Masterton Homes	Ford XE Falcon	2	(Australia) Steve Masterton
Cadbury-Schweppes Racing	Holden VH Commodore	3	(Australia) David Parsons
Roadways Racing	Holden VH Commodore	4	(Australia) Steve Harrington
Roadways Racing	Holden VH Commodore	6	(Australia) Allan Grice
Marlboro Holden Dealer Team	Holden VH Commodore	05	(Australia) Peter Brock (Australia) John Harvey
K-Mart Auto Racing	Holden VH Commodore	8	(Australia) Warren Cullen
K-Mart Auto Racing	Holden VH Commodore	9	(Australia) Andrew Harris
John Sands Racing	Holden VH Commodore	10	(Australia) Rusty French
State Building Society/Rolfen	Mazda RX-7	10	(Australia) Bob Morris
Garry Willmington Performance	Ford XD Falcon	11	(Australia) Garry Willmington
Jim Keogh	Holden VH Commodore	12	(Australia) Jim Keogh
Bob Holden Motors	Ford Escort Mk.II	14	(Australia) Lyndon Arnel
John English	Ford XD Falcon	14	(Australia) John English
Repco Accessories	Holden VH Commodore	14	(Australia) Terry Finnigan
Nissan	Nissan Bluebird Turbo	15	(Australia) George Fury
Nissan	Nissan Bluebird Turbo	16	(Australia) Gary Scott
Palmer Tube Mills	Ford XE Falcon	17	(Australia) Dick Johnson
Valentine Greetings	Mazda RX-7	18	(Australia) Murray Carter
Rob Collins	Mazda RX-7	19	(Australia) Rob Collins
David Cox	Mazda RX-7	19	(Australia) David Cox
Lusty Engineering	Holden VH Commodore	21	(Australia) John Lusty
PF Motor Racing	Chevrolet Camaro Z28	22	(Australia) Bryan Thompson
Everlast Battery Service	Ford XD Falcon	26	(Australia) Bill O'Brien
Alf Grant	Ford XD Falcon	27	(Australia) Alf Grant
Brian Bolwell	Ford Escort Mk.II	28	(Australia) Brian Bolwell
Bayside Spares	Holden VH Commodore	28	(Australia) Barry Lawrence
Paul Jones	Ford XE Falcon	29	(Australia) Paul Jones
JPS Team BMW	BMW 635CSi	31	(New Zealand) Jim Richards
Chris Clearihan	Mazda RX-7	32	(Australia) Chris Clearihan
Mike Burgmann	Mazda RX-7	33	(Australia) Mike Burgmann
Murray Coote	Mazda 323	37	(Australia) Murray Coote
Bernie Stack	Holden VH Commodore	38	(Australia) Bernie Stack
John Bundy	Mazda RX-7	39	(Australia) John Bundy
King George Tavern	Ford XE Falcon	40	(Australia) Joe Moore
Allan Moffat Racing	Mazda RX-7	43	(Canada) Allan Moffat
Bryan Byrt Ford	Ford Capri Mk.III	44	(Australia) Craig Harris
Gary Hinton	Holden VH Commodore	45	(Australia) Gary Hinton (Australia) Lester Smerdon
Dean Lindstrom	Mazda RX-7	47	(Australia) Dean Lindstrom
John Donnelly	Ford XD Falcon	49	Simon Harrex
Martin Power	Triumph Dolomite Sprint	49	(Australia) Martin Power
Petrolon Slick 50 Racing	Mazda RX-7	50	(Australia) Peter McLeod
David Grose	Mazda RX-7	52	David Grose
Swiss Motors	Mazda RX-7	53	(Australia) Ernie Carniello
Barry Seton	Ford Capri Mk.III	55	(Australia) Glenn Seton
Jim Myhill	Mazda RX-7	57	(Australia) Jim Myhill
Lawrie Nelson	Ford Capri Mk.III	59	(Australia) Lawrie Nelson
Country Dealer Team	Isuzu Gemini PF60	60	(Australia) Dennis Horley
Les Ski Racing	Isuzu Gemini	61	(Australia) Les Szreniawski
Peter Brierley	Holden VH Commodore SS	62	(Australia) Peter Brierley
John White	Isuzu Gemini ZZ	65	(Australia) John White
Ian Burrell	Mitsubishi Colt	66	(Australia) Ian Burrell
Fred Geissler	Holden VH Commodore	66	(Australia) Fred Geissler
Alexandra Surplice	Toyota Corolla Levin	67	Alexandra Surplice
Lyndon Arnel	Ford Escort Mk.II	68	(Australia) Lyndon Arnel
Don Smith	Ford Capri Mk.III	69	(Australia) Don Smith
Bayswater Automotor Wreckers	Holden VH Commodore	70	(Australia) Colin Campbell
Bob Holden Motors	Toyota Celica	73	(Australia) Bob Holden
Garry McGrath	Ford Escort Mk.II	77	(Australia) Garry McGrath
Clynton Arentz	Ford Escort Mk.II	79	Clynton Arentz
Ken Harrison	Ford Escort Mk.II	80	(Australia) Ken Harrison
Russell Worthington	Mazda 626	100	(Australia) Russell Worthington

== Race calendar ==
The 1984 Australian Touring Car Championship was contested over a seven-round series with one race per round.

Rd.	Race title	Circuit	City / state	Date	Winner	Team	Report
1	Sandown	Sandown International Raceway	Melbourne, Victoria	18 February	Peter Brock	Marlboro Holden Dealer Team	
2	Symmons Plains	Symmons Plains Raceway	Launceston, Tasmania	11 March	Peter Brock	Marlboro Holden Dealer Team	
3	Wanneroo	Wanneroo Park Raceway	Perth, Western Australia	1 April	Allan Moffat	Peter Stuyvesant International Racing	
4	Surfers Paradise	Surfers Paradise International Raceway	Surfers Paradise, Queensland	13 May	Dick Johnson	Palmer Tube Mills	
5	The Castrol Flying Fifty	Oran Park Raceway	Sydney, New South Wales	27 May	Bob Morris	Barry Jones	
6	Lakeside	Lakeside International Raceway	Brisbane, Queensland	17 June	George Fury	Nissan	
7	Motorcraft 100	Adelaide International Raceway	Adelaide, South Australia	1 July	Allan Grice	Roadways Racing	

== Points system ==
Cars competed in two engine displacement classes, "up to and including 3000cc" and "3001-6000cc".

Points were awarded for the first twenty outright places in each round using a two tier system as shown in the following table.

The 3001-6000cc class was made up of BMW 635 CSi, Chevrolet Camaro Z28, Ford XD Falcon, Ford XE Falcon, Holden VH Commodore, Mazda RX-7 and Nissan Bluebird Turbo.

Up to and including 3000cc consisted of Ford Capri Mk.III, Ford Escort Mk.II, Isuzu Gemini, Mazda 323, Mazda 626, Mitsubishi Colt, Toyota Celica and Triumph Dolomite Sprint

Outright position	1st	2nd	3rd	4th	5th	6th	7th	8th	9th	10th	11th	12th	13th	14th	15th	16th	17th	18th	19th	20th
Points if up to 3000cc	30	27	24	21	19	17	15	14	13	12	11	10	9	8	7	6	5	4	3	2
Points if 3001-6000cc	25	23	20	17	15	13	11	10	9	8	7	6	5	4	3	2	1	0	0	0

Points from the best six round results only could be retained by each driver.

== Championship standings ==
Pos.	Driver	Car	San.	Sym.	Wan.	Sur.	Ora.	Lak.	Ade.	Pts.
1	Dick Johnson	Ford XE Falcon	2nd	2nd	3rd	1st	3rd	2nd	(3rd)	134 (154)
2	Peter Brock	Holden VH Commodore	1st	1st	2nd		Ret		2nd	96
3	Peter McLeod	Mazda RX-7	Ret	4th	4th	2nd	2nd	5th	Ret	95
4	Warren Cullen	Holden VH Commodore	6th	6th	(12th)	5th	5th	3rd	5th	91 (97)
5	Jim Richards	BMW 635 CSi	4th	Ret	8th	3rd	16th	4th	7th	77
6	Andrew Harris	Holden VH Commodore	Ret	8th	5th	7th	Ret	6th	10th	57
7	Allan Grice	Holden VH Commodore	Ret	3rd			7th		1st	56
8	Murray Carter	Mazda RX-7	11th	10th	7th	6th	Ret		8th	49
9	Allan Moffat	Mazda RX-7	3rd	Ret	1st	Ret				45
=	Steve Harrington	Holden VH Commodore	Ret	5th		4th	Ret		6th	45
11	George Fury	Nissan Bluebird	5th	Ret	Ret		Ret	1st	Ret	40
12	Brian Bolwell	Ford Escort	16th	14th	13th	15th			15th	37
13	Bob Morris	Mazda RX-7					1st			25
=	Glenn Seton	Ford Capri				16th	13th	12th		25
15	Garry Willmington	Ford XE Falcon				Ret	6th	7th		24
16	Chris Clearihan	Mazda RX-7				10th	11th	11th		22
17	David Parsons	Holden VH Commodore	9th	7th						20
18	Jim Keogh	Holden VH Commodore	8th	9th	Ret					19
=	Lawrie Nelson	Ford Capri	12th	13th			Ret			19
=	Dean Lindstrom	Mazda RX-7	Ret				12th		13th	19
=	Craig Harris	Ford Capri	13th			17th		17th		19
22	Terry Finnigan	Holden VH Commodore					4th			17
=	Gary Scott	Nissan Bluebird							4th	17
=	Graham Lusty	Holden VH Commodore		11th		8th				17
25	John English	Ford XD Falcon				11th		10th		15
26	John Lusty	Holden VH Commodore	Ret		6th				Ret	13
27	Ken Harrison	Ford Escort	15th						17th	12
28	Rusty French	Holden VH Commodore	7th							11
=	Murray Coote	Mazda 323				19th		14th		11
30	Mike Burgmann	Mazda RX-7					8th			10
=	Barry Lawrence	Holden VH Commodore						8th		10
=	Dennis Horley	Isuzu Gemini PF60	18th						16th	10
33	Bernie Stack	Holden VH Commodore			9th					9
=	Steve Masterton	Ford XE Falcon	Ret			9th	Ret			9
=	Fred Geissler	Holden VH Commodore					9th			9
=	John Harvey	Holden VH Commodore				Ret		9th		9
=	David Cox	Mazda RX-7				Ret			9th	9
38	Paul Jones	Ford XE Falcon	10th							8
=	Lyndon Arnel	Ford Escort	14th				Ret			8
=	Colin Campbell	Holden VH Commodore	Ret		10th	Ret				8
=	Bill O'Brien	Ford XD Falcon					10th			8
=	Don Smith	Ford Capri					14th			8
=	Joe Moore	Ford XE Falcon				13th	15th			8
44	Rob Collins	Mazda RX-7			11th					7
=	John Bundy	Mazda RX-7	Ret	DNS			Ret		11th	7
46	Ernie Carniello	Mazda RX-7	Ret	12th						6
=	Alf Grant	Ford XD Falcon				12th				6
=	Bryan Thompson	Chevrolet Camaro Z28							12th	6
=	Clynton Arentz	Ford Escort						16th		6
50	John White	Isuzu Gemini ZZ	17th							5
=	Simon Harrex	Ford XD Falcon						13th		5
52	Peter Brierley	Holden VH Commodore				14th				4
=	Jim Myhill	Mazda RX-7							14th	4
54	Martin Power	Triumph Dolomite Sprint	19th						Ret	3
=	David Grose	Mazda RX-7						19th		3
56	Garry McGrath	Ford Escort				20th				2
Pos	Driver	Car	San.	Sym.	Wan.	Sur.	Ora.	Lak.	Ade.	Pts.

Colour	Result
Gold	Winner
Silver	Second place
Bronze	Third place
Green	Points classification
Blue	Non-points classification
Blue	Non-classified finish (NC)
Purple	Retired, not classified (Ret)
Red	Did not qualify (DNQ)
Red	Did not pre-qualify (DNPQ)
Black	Disqualified (DSQ)
White	Did not start (DNS)
White	Withdrew (WD)
White	Race cancelled (C)
Blank	Did not practice (DNP)
Blank	Did not arrive (DNA)
Blank	Excluded (EX)
