= 1982 Castrol 400 =

The 1982 Castrol 400 was an endurance race for touring cars complying with CAMS Group C regulations. The event was held at the Sandown Raceway circuit in Victoria on 12 September 1982 over 109 laps, totalling 337.9 km. The field was divided into four classes according to engine capacity:

- Class A : Up to 1600 cc
- Class B : 1601 – 2000 cc
- Class C : 2001 – 3000 cc
- Class D : 3001 – 6000 cc

There were 52 starters in the event, which was the second round of the 1982 Australian Endurance Championship and the second round of the 1982 Australian Endurance Championship of Makes.

Allan Moffat's win in his Peter Stuyvesant International Mazda RX-7 was the first outright win by a car from a Japanese manufacturer in the annual Sandown endurance race.

== Results ==
Position	Drivers	No.	Car	Entrant	Class	Laps
1	(Canada) Allan Moffat	43	Mazda RX-7	Peter Stuyvesant International	D	109
2	(Australia) Allan Grice	4	Holden VH Commodore SS	Re-Car Racing	D	109
3	(Australia) Dick Johnson	17	Ford XE Falcon	Palmer Tube Mills	D	108
4	(Australia) John Harvey (Australia) Gary Scott	25	Holden Commodore VH SS	Marlboro Holden Dealer Team	D	108
5	(Australia) Terry Shiel	37	Mazda RX-7	Eurocars Mazda	D	107
6	(Australia) Charlie O'Brien (Australia) Clive Benson-Brown	11	Holden VC Commodore	Sound Wave Discos	D	106
7	(Australia) Garry Rogers (Australia) Ron Wanless	16	Holden VH Commodore SS	Re-Car Racing	D	106
8	(Australia) Fred Gibson	56	Nissan Bluebird Turbo	Nissan	C	106
9	(Australia) Greg Toepfer (Australia) Ken Matthews	19	Holden VH Commodore SS	Citizen Watches	D	105
10	(New Zealand) Jim Richards	31	BMW 635 CSi	JPS Team BMW	D	105
11	(Australia) John Goss	10	Jaguar XJS	John Goss Racing	D	104
12	(New Zealand) Peter Janson	3	Holden VH Commodore SS	Cadbury Schweppes	D	103
13	(Australia) Bill O'Brien (Australia) Brian Sampson	36	Ford XD Falcon	Everlast Batteries Service	D	103
14	(Australia) Peter McLeod (Australia) Peter Dane	40	Mazda RX-7	Strongbow Racing Team	D	103
15	(Australia) John French (Australia) Alf Grant	23	Ford XD Falcon	Alf Grant Racing	D	102
16	(Australia) John Duggan	34	Mazda RX-7	John Duggan	D	101
17	(Australia) Steve Harrington (Australia) Garth Wigston	21	Holden VH Commodore SS	Roadways Racing	D	98
18	(Australia) Graeme Bailey (Australia) Steve Land	61	Toyota Celica	Chickadee Chicken	B	98
19	(Australia) Gerry Burges	33	Mazda RX-7	Gerry Burges	D	97
20	(Australia) Peter Beninca (Australia) Joe Beninca	66	Alfa Romeo GTV	Beninca Motors	B	96
21	(Australia) James Myhill (Australia) John Bundy	49	Mazda RX-3	J. Myhill	C	95
22	(Australia) Jim Faneco (Australia) Allan Gough	68	Isuzu Gemini ZZ	Country Dealer Team	A	94
23	(Australia) Ian Burrell (Australia) Rob Shute	76	Mitsubishi Colt	Eastside Mitsubishi	A	94
24	(Australia) Peter Boston	74	Isuzu Gemini PF50	P. Boston	A	93
25	(Australia) Ian Wells	97	Mitsubishi Lancer	I. Wells	A	91
26	(Australia) Martin Power	59	Triumph Dolomite Sprint	Jag Parts	B	91
27	(Australia) Brian Winsall	87	Isuzu Gemini	1.6 Litre Touring Car Association	A	90
28	(Australia) Tony Mulvihill	64	Ford Escort	Bob Holden Motors	B	80
29	(Australia) Lester Smerdon	83	Isuzu Gemini PF50	L. Smerdon	A	75
	Other starters included the following:					
DNF	(Australia) Steve Masterton	2	Ford XE Falcon	Masterton Homes P/L	D	
DNF	(Australia) Peter Brock	05	Holden VH Commodore SS	Marlboro Holden Dealer Team	D	
DNF	(Australia) Bob Morris	7	Ford XE Falcon	Alan Jones	D	
DNF	(Australia) Colin Bond (Australia) Kevin Bartlett	9	Chevrolet Camaro Z28	Nine Network Racing Team	D	
DNF	(Australia) David Parsons	13	Holden VH Commodore SS	Cadbury Schweppes	D	
DNF	(Australia) Murray Carter	18	Ford XE Falcon	Murray Carter John Sands Racing	D	
DNF	(Australia) Warren Cullen	22	Holden VH Commodore SS	Cullen Automotive Industries	D	
DNF	(Australia) Alan Jones	27	Mazda RX-7	Alan Jones	D	
DNF	(Australia) Allan Taylor (Australia) Kevin Kennedy	32	Holden VC Commodore	Scotty Taylor Racing	D	
DNF	(Australia) Bernie Stack (Australia) Keith Poole	38	Holden VC Commodore	Gawler Body Works	D	
DNF	(Australia) Gregg Hansford (Australia) Lucio Cesario	42	Mazda RX-7	Peter Stuyvesant International	D	
NC	(Australia) John Craft (Australia) Barry Seton	52	Ford Capri	Hulcraft Autos	C	
DNF	(Australia) George Fury	55	Nissan Bluebird Turbo	Nissan Motor Company	C	
DNF	(Australia) Bob Holden	63	Ford Escort	Bob Holden Motors	B	
DNF	(Australia) Alexandra Surplice (Australia) Doug Clark	71	Toyota Corolla Levin	A. Surplice	A	
DNF	(Australia) Craig Bellman	78	Isuzu Gemini	C. Bellman	A	
DNF	(Australia) Arthur Abrahams	90	Ford Escort		B	

== See also ==
- 1982 Castrol 400 – full race

Preceded by 1981 Hang Ten 400	Sandown 400; 1982	Succeeded by 1983 Castrol 400
