= 1983 Australian Touring Car Championship =

Motor racing competition

Seasons
- ← 1982 1984 →

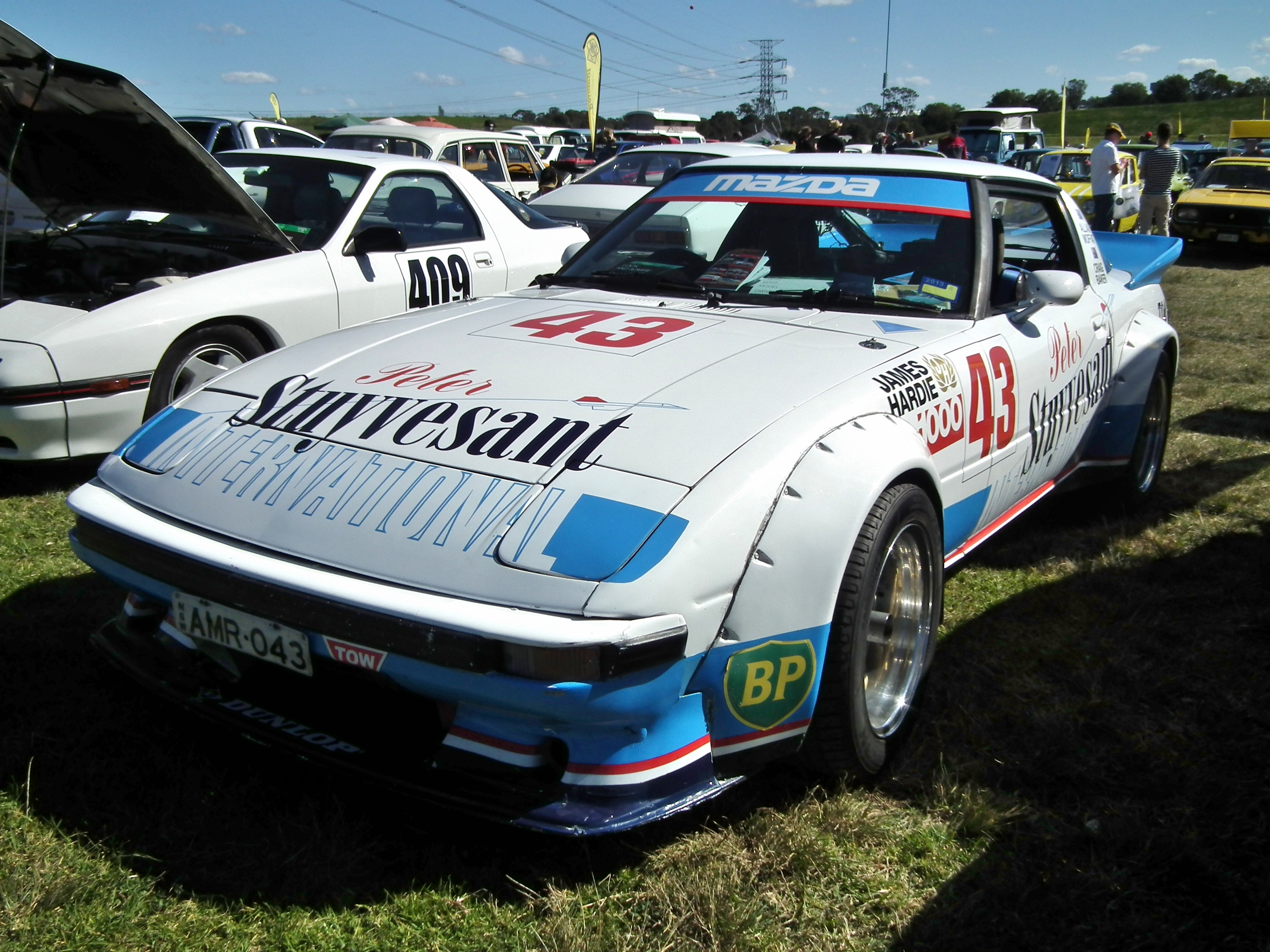
Allan Moffat won the championship driving a Mazda RX-7 similar to that pictured above

The 1983 Australian Touring Car Championship was a CAMS sanctioned motor racing title for drivers of Group C Touring Cars. The title, which was the 24th Australian Touring Car Championship, was contested over a series which began on 6 February 1983 at Calder Park Raceway and ended on 19 June at Lakeside International Raceway after eight rounds.

The championship was won by Allan Moffat driving a Mazda RX-7.

== Television Coverage ==
In 1983, the ATCC coverage was split between Channel 7 and the ABC, made necessary due to some circuit promotors having existing TV broadcasting contracts. Thus the Bob Jane owned and promoted Calder Park had its opening round of the ATCC televised by Seven with commentary from Evan Green, Mike Raymond, Garry Wilkinson and pit reporter, former Holden Dealer Team manager John Sheppard, while the rest of the series was televised by the ABC with commentary from Will Hagon, John Smailes, Drew Morphett and Neil Crompton, while they were joined at the Wanneroo round in Perth by Dennis Cometti and at the Oran Park round in Sydney by Bob Vincent.

== Season summary ==
The championship was won by Allan Moffat, his fourth and final Australian Touring Car Championship and a first for Mazda, who were helping to fund Moffat's team and it was also the first ATCC win for a Japanese manufacturer. Moffat himself dominated the racing, taking four out of the eight race wins, but a beneficial points structure for smaller capacity cars allowed George Fury (driving a turbocharged version of the Nissan Bluebird) to push Moffat all the way to the title, despite not actually winning a race. The folly in the point system was exposed at the first round at Calder when Moffat won the race from Fury, but Fury actually led the championship by finishing second outright in a smaller capacity car (Moffat scored 25 for winning while Fury scored 27 for finishing second). When Fury took the lead for a brief time at Calder, it was the first time that a turbo powered car had led an ATCC race.

Peter Brock in his Marlboro Holden Dealer Team VH Commodore SS finished third in the championship. Brock's early season form and some uncharacteristic reliability problems saw him lagging in ninth place at the midway point in the championship after failing to finish at Calder and Symmons Plains thanks to gearbox failure both times, while finishing third at Sandown and ninth at Wanneroo after spinning out of the lead in a dice with Moffat and Fury (Moffat's win at Wanneroo caused a sensation due to his Formula One style mid-race pit stop for fuel). Brock's championship got back on track with an all-the-way win in Adelaide where he won by the length of the Commodore's bumper bar from Moffat who actually got his Mazda in front 50 metres from the flag but lost out to the power of the V8 Commodore (as of 2025 this is still the smallest winning margin ever in an ATCC race). From there he finished with two seconds and a win to round out the series.

Brock's win in the final round at Lakeside was easily one of the drives of the series. In difficult, wet conditions that actually suited the smaller RX-7's rather than the heavier Commodores and Falcons, he lapped the entire field in the 35 laps after taking the lead on lap 2. His race almost ended coming out of the Karrasell on the first lap when the left rear tyre of his Commodore got out into the mud and pitched the car sideways, almost into the path of both Dick Johnson in his Falcon, the big Ford finally working somewhere near right thanks to suspension work from former Williams F1 mechanic Wayne Eckersley who correctly deduced that the cars problem was actually incorrect settings on the front suspension and not at the rear as initially thought, and the ever improving ex-motorcycle Grand Prix winner Gregg Hansford in the second Allan Moffat Racing Mazda RX-7. Brock recovered still in 3rd place and soon past an ailing Johnson whose Falcon had suffered a power steering pump failure on the grid which would cause his early retirement as he could not steer the car properly. Brock then passed early leader Moffat on lap 2 and proceeded to run away from the field. Hansford also overtook Moffat who was wisely driving with an eye on the title, but Brock lapped the #31 Mazda through the back section of the circuit on the last lap.

Moffat, Brock and Allan Grice (who won rounds 2 and 3 at Sandown and Symmons Plains in his new Roadways Racing Commodore before fading later in the series) were the only race winners in the 1983 ATCC. Defending champion Dick Johnson battled season long with an ill-handling Ford XE Falcon and could only manage two distant 3rd placings at both Sandown and Wanneroo (where he led for the only time in the series) to finish a disappointing 6th in the championship, 94 points behind Moffat. Johnson's 351 cu in (5.8 L) V8 Falcon had the power, but not the handling to be a serious contender for the crown. It was only discovered before the final round at Lakeside that the problem with the Falcon's handling had been both a lack of rear tyres as well as the front suspension of the car.

Whilst Nissan driver George Fury, helped by consistent performances, led the series (uncorrected points) going into the final round at Lakeside, Fury was essentially 5 points behind Moffat in the points system corrected for the top 7 races, therefore Fury needed to finish ahead of Moffat or Moffat finish in 6th place or worse to claim the title. As Moffat had finished well ahead of Fury in all but the one race were the Mazda broke its axle, team manager Howard Marsden decided the team would skip the round as they were not in major contention to win the title (officially to further develop the car before Bathurst). Moffat finished the final race in 3rd position, behind Brock and teammate Gregg Hansford, claiming the 1983 ATCC 6 points ahead of Fury in second place.

Controversy also reigned throughout the series with some teams such as the MHDT (Brock) and STP Roadways (Grice) claiming that Moffat was foxing during the championship and not racing as fast as he could in an effort to 'hoodwink' CAMS into believing the RX-7's, which ran the 1.2 Litre 12A rotary engine in the championship, needed the larger and more powerful (by some 30 bhp (22 kW; 30 PS)) 1.3 Litre 13B engine to be competitive against the V8's at Bathurst. It was the Surfers Paradise round that really raised the ire of Brock. While Moffat claimed he was flat out at the head of the field fending off Brock for the win, his less experienced (in car racing at least) team mate Gregg Hansford in the backup Peter Stuyvesant Racing Mazda was coming back through the field after a bad start from his 3rd (front row) starting spot ... and was consistently lapping over a second faster than his boss in what was Hansford's first ever ATCC race. Ultimately CAMS approved the larger 13B engine for the RX-7's (as well as a late approval for fuel injection despite hiring independent administrator Graham Hoinville who studied the situation and recommended that neither the 13B nor its fuel injection should be granted), but also granted concessions to the Commodores and Falcons which ended up giving the bigger cars a speed advantage on the Mountain.

Controversially CAMS announced the concessions for the post-ATCC 1 August homologation during the race of Round 7 at Oran Park via the ABC's telecast of the race, with ABC commentators Will Hagon and John Smailes making the announcement mid-race. In a TV interview with Smailes immediately following his 2nd placing to Moffat, Peter Brock was informed of the new homologations and expressed his displeasure with CAMS for announcing it on television during the race and not letting those who the decision affected (the teams) know first. The fallout from CAMS decision led to both the Nissan and Roadways teams boycotting the final race of the series at Lakeside, though the official reason given by Nissan team manager Howard Marsden was that the Bluebirds needed further development for the upcoming 1983 Australian Endurance Championship which included both blue ribbon events, the Sandown 400 and the James Hardie 1000 at Bathurst.

Nissan's boycott of the last round also meant that series leader George Fury virtually forfeited his closest chance of winning an Australian Touring Car Championship and becoming the only driver other than Colin Bond to win both the ATCC and the Australian Rally Championship with Fury previously having won the Rally title in both 1977 and 1980. Despite this it was generally felt that the championship went to the right driver as Moffat and his RX-7 were usually the fastest combination and the expat Canadian was regarded as the man to beat. Moffat only failed to finish once at Sandown (broken axle) and finished every other race on the podium, including four wins, four pole positions and five fastest laps resulting in new lap records at Sandown, Symmons Plains, Wanneroo, Surfers (shared with Brock) and Oran Park, while Fury's best were two seconds (Calder and Wanneroo) and one third at Symmons Plains. Also in each race that both Moffat and Fury finished, the Mazda finished ahead of the Nissan, making it fairly unlikely Fury would win the championship in the last round, unless Moffat suffered a breakdown or was involved in an accident, which if either occurred would've meant the Nissan driver would win the championship in any case, hence a rather pragmatic decision was made by the Nissan team not to compete at the last event.

One outcome from this series was that in the future turbocharged cars had their engine capacities multiplied for the purposes of class point score weightings, meaning that in the 1984 Australian Touring Car Championship, the Bluebirds would compete on an equal footing with the other outright class competitors (this actually took effect prior to the start of the 1983 Endurance Championship which started two months after the ATCC concluded). Despite this meaning that the Nissan would score equal points as the RX-7's, Commodores and Falcons, Nissan team boss Howard Marsden raised no objections to the change as the 1.8 litre turbo had proven that it was able to match the speed of the outright class cars. Indeed, later in the year Fury would showcase the speed of the car, qualifying the Bluebird on the front row of the grid at Bathurst, traditionally the sole domain of the more powerful V8 powered cars.

== Entrants and drivers ==
The following entrants and drivers competed in the 1983 Australian Touring Car Championship.

Entrant	Vehicle	No	Driver
Masterton Homes	Ford XE Falcon	2	(Australia) Steve Masterton
Mike Burgmann	Chevrolet Camaro Z28	3	(Australia) Mike Burgmann
Cadbury-Schweppes Racing	Holden VH Commodore SS	3	(New Zealand) Peter Janson
STP Roadways Racing	Holden VH Commodore SS	4	(Australia) Steve Harrington
STP Roadways Racing	Holden VH Commodore SS	6	(Australia) Allan Grice
Marlboro Holden Dealer Team	Holden VH Commodore SS	05	(Australia) Peter Brock
Peter Brierley	Holden VH Commodore	7; 62	(Australia) Peter Brierley
Garry Wilmington Performance	Ford XD Falcon	8	(Australia) Garry Wilmington
Andrew Harris	Ford XE Falcon	9	(Australia) Andrew Harris
Soundwave Discos	Holden VH Commodore SS	11	(United Kingdom) Clive Benson-Brown (Australia) Garry Rogers
Team Toshiba	Holden VH Commodore SS	12	(Australia) Jim Keogh
Bob Holden Motors	Ford Escort Mk.II	13	(Australia) Bob Holden
John English	Ford XD Falcon	14	(Australia) John English
Ken Hastings	Mazda RX-7	15	(Australia) Ken Hastings
John Donnelly	Ford XD Falcon	15	(Australia) John Donnelly
Terry Finnigan	Holden VH Commodore SS	15	(Australia) Terry Finnigan
Rusty French	Holden VH Commodore SS	16	(Australia) Rusty French
Re-Car Racing	Holden VH Commodore SS	16	(Australia) Garry Rogers
Palmer Tube Mills	Ford XE Falcon	17	(Australia) Dick Johnson
Murray Carter	Ford XE Falcon	18	(Australia) Murray Carter
Gary Hinton	Holden VH Commodore SS	18	(Australia) Gary Hinton
RJ Collins	Mazda RX-7	19	(Australia) Les Verco
Ken Mathews	Holden VH Commodore SS	19	(Australia) Ken Mathews
Warren Cullen Auto Salvage	Holden VH Commodore SS	22	(Australia) Warren Cullen (Australia) Ron Harrop
Frankie Saracino	Ford XD Falcon	25	(Australia) Frankie Saracino
Everlast	Ford XD Falcon	26	(Australia) Bill O'Brien
Bayside Spares	Holden VH Commodore SS	28	(Australia) Barry Lawrence
Peter Stuyvesant International Racing	Mazda RX-7	31	(Australia) Gregg Hansford
Peter Stuyvesant International Racing	Mazda RX-7	43	(Canada) Allan Moffat
Bernie Parmenter	Ford Capri Mk.II	32	(Australia) Bernie Parmenter
Lester Smerdon	Isuzu Gemini	33	(Australia) Lester Smerdon
Eurocars (Northside) Pty. Ltd.	Mazda RX-7	37	(Australia) Terry Shiel
Bernie Stack	Holden VH Commodore SS	38	(Australia) Bernie Stack
Barry Jones	Mazda RX-7	41	(Australia) Barry Jones
Ross Burbidge	Mazda RX-7	46	(Australia) Ross Burbidge
Roger Manson Holden	Isuzu Gemini PF50	48	(Australia) Roger Manson
Martin Power	Triumph Dolomite Sprint	49	(Australia) Martin Power
David Parsons	Holden VH Commodore SS	50	(Australia) David Parsons
Capri Components	Ford Capri Mk.III S	51; 58	(Australia) Lawrie Nelson
Nissan	Nissan Bluebird Turbo	55	(Australia) George Fury
Nissan	Nissan Bluebird Turbo	56	(Australia) Fred Gibson
Hulcraft Autos	Ford Capri Mk.III	56	(Australia) John Craft
Beninca Motors	Alfa Romeo Alfetta GTV	59	(Australia) Peter Beninca
Petrolon Slick 50 Racing	Mazda RX-7	59; 60	(Australia) Peter McLeod
Jim Faneco	Isuzu Gemini	60	(Australia) Jim Faneco
Les Grose	Ford Capri Mk.III	64	(Australia) Les Grose
John White	Isuzu Gemini	65	(Australia) John White
Kevin Bartlett	Chevrolet Camaro Z28	66	(Australia) Kevin Bartlett
Bob Thomas	Mazda RX-3	66	(Australia) Bob Thomas
Mike Imrie	Ford XD Falcon	67	(Australia) Mike Imrie
Mike Imrie	Ford XD Falcon	67	(Australia) Graham Treasure
Alf Grant	Ford XD Falcon	71	(Australia) Alf Grant
John Eaton	Holden VH Commodore	72	(Australia) John Eaton
Graham Mein	Ford Escort Mk.II	77	(Australia) Graham Mein
The Daily Planet	Toyota Celica	88	(Australia) Craig Bradtke
Russell Worthington	Mazda 626	100	(Australia) Russell Worthington

== Race calendar ==
The 1983 Australian Touring Car Championship was contested over an eight-round series across six states with one race per round.

Rd.	Race title	Circuit	City / state	Date	Winner	Team	Report
1	(Victoria (state)) Calder Park	Calder Park Raceway	Melbourne, Victoria	6 February	Allan Moffat	Peter Stuyvesant International Racing	
2	(Victoria (state)) International Motor Show Trophy	Sandown International Raceway	Melbourne, Victoria	20 February	Allan Grice	STP Roadways Racing	
3	(Tasmania) Symmons Plains	Symmons Plains Raceway	Launceston, Tasmania	13 March	Allan Grice	STP Roadways Racing	
4	(Western Australia) Saab-Scania Cup	Wanneroo Park Raceway	Perth, Western Australia	24 April	Allan Moffat	Peter Stuyvesant International Racing	
5	(South Australia) Mazda 100	Adelaide International Raceway	Adelaide, South Australia	1 May	Peter Brock	Marlboro Holden Dealer Team	
6	(Queensland) Surfers Paradise	Surfers Paradise International Raceway	Surfers Paradise, Queensland	15 May	Allan Moffat	Peter Stuyvesant International Racing	
7	(New South Wales) Oran Park	Oran Park Raceway	Sydney, New South Wales	29 May	Allan Moffat	Peter Stuyvesant International Racing	
8	(Queensland) Lakeside	Lakeside International Raceway	Brisbane, Queensland	19 June	Peter Brock	Marlboro Holden Dealer Team	

== Classes ==
Car competed in two classes,

- Up to and including 3000cc
- 3001-6000cc

The "Up to and including 3000cc class" consisted of Alfa Romeo Alfetta, Nissan Bluebird turbo, Ford Capri, Ford Escort, Isuzu Gemini, Mazda 626, Mazda RX-3, Toyota Celica and Triumph Dolomite Sprint.
The "3001-6000cc class" consisted of Chevrolet Camaro, Ford Falcon, Holden Commodore and Mazda RX-7.

== Points system ==
Championship points were awarded on a two tier system to the top twenty outright finishers in each round.

Outright Position	1	2	3	4	5	6	7	8	9	10	11	12	13	14	15	16	17	18	19	20
Points if Up to 3000cc	30	27	24	21	19	17	15	14	13	12	11	10	9	8	7	6	5	4	3	2
Points if 3001-6000cc	25	23	20	17	15	13	11	10	9	8	7	6	5	4	3	2	1	0	0	0

Only the best seven round results could be counted by each driver.

== Results ==
Pos	Driver	Car	Cal.	San.	Sym.	Wan.	Adl.	Sur.	Ora.	Lak.	Pts
1	Allan Moffat	Mazda RX-7	1st	Ret	2nd	1st	2nd	1st	1st	3rd	166
2	George Fury	Nissan Bluebird	2nd	4th	3rd	2nd	4th	4th	5th		160
3	Peter Brock	Holden VH Commodore SS	Ret	2nd	Ret	9th	1st	2nd	2nd	1st	128
4	Allan Grice	Holden VH Commodore SS	Ret	1st	1st	Ret	3rd	Ret	3rd		90
5	Steve Harrington	Holden VH Commodore SS	6th	6th	6th	4th	Ret	5th	Ret		71
6	Dick Johnson	Ford XE Falcon	Ret	3rd	5th	3rd	5th	Ret	Ret	Ret	70
7	David Parsons	Holden VH Commodore SS	Ret	Ret	4th	5th	Ret		8th	5th	57
8	Gregg Hansford	Mazda RX-7						3rd	6th	2nd	56
9	Lawrie Nelson	Ford Capri	10th	12th	9th		10th		14th		55
10	Murray Carter	Ford XE Falcon	3rd	5th	Ret						35
11	Warren Cullen	Holden VH Commodore SS	5th	9th	7th	Ret					35
12	Bernie Parmenter	Ford Capri	11th				11th	10th			34
13	Clive Benson-Brown	Holden VH Commodore SS	9th		8th	7th	Ret				30
14	John White	Isuzu Gemini	12th	15th			Ret	11th			28
15	Garry Rogers	Holden VH Commodore SS	4th	8th							27
15	Fred Gibson	Nissan Bluebird	7th	Ret					10th		27
17	Steve Masterton	Ford XE Falcon	Ret	7th				6th			24
17	Alf Grant	Ford XD Falcon						7th		6th	24
19	Lester Smerdon	Isuzu Gemini						13th		8th	23
20	Bob Holden	Ford Escort	14th		10th						20
21	Bernie Stack	Holden VH Commodore SS		11th			7th				18
22	Barry Jones	Mazda RX-7							4th		17
22	Barry Lawrence	Holden VH Commodore SS								4th	17
24	Gary Hinton	Holden VH Commodore SS						14th		7th	15
24	Ken Hastings	Mazda RX-7	8th	13th							15
24	Peter Beninca	Alfa Romeo Alfetta GTV	13th	16th							15
27	Peter Brierly	Holden VH Commodore SS						9th	13th	Ret	14
28	Garry Willmington	Ford XD Falcon				6th	DNS		Ret		13
28	Ron Harrop	Holden VH Commodore SS					6th				13
28	Russell Worthington	Mazda 626								9th	13
31	Terry Finnigan	Holden VH Commodore SS							7th		11
32	Les Verco	Mazda RX-7				8th					10
32	Jim Keogh	Holden VH Commodore SS					8th				10
32	John English	Ford XD Falcon						8th		Ret	10
32	Roger Manson	Isuzu Gemini					12th				10
32	Graham Mein	Ford Escort						12th			10
37	Andrew Harris	Ford XE Falcon					9th				9
37	Kevin Bartlett	Chevrolet Camaro							9th		9
39	Rusty French	Holden VH Commodore SS		10th							8
40	Ken Mathews	Holden VH Commodore SS							11th		7
40	Les Grose	Ford Capri							15th		7
42	Bill O'Brien	Ford XD Falcon							12th		6
43	Martin Power	Triumph Dolomite		17th							5
44	Mike Imrie	Ford XD Falcon		14th							4
44	Jim Faneco	Isuzu Gemini		18th							4
46	John Donnelly	Ford XD Falcon						15th		Ret	3
Pos	Driver	Car	Cal.	San.	Sym.	Wan.	Mal.	Sur.	Ora.	Lak.	Pts

Colour	Result
Gold	Winner
Silver	Second place
Bronze	Third place
Green	Points classification
Blue	Non-points classification
Blue	Non-classified finish (NC)
Purple	Retired, not classified (Ret)
Red	Did not qualify (DNQ)
Red	Did not pre-qualify (DNPQ)
Black	Disqualified (DSQ)
White	Did not start (DNS)
White	Withdrew (WD)
White	Race cancelled (C)
Blank	Did not practice (DNP)
Blank	Did not arrive (DNA)
Blank	Excluded (EX)
