= Allan Moffat Racing =

Motor racing team

- Manufacturer: Ford; Mazda; Holden
- Team Principal: Allan Moffat
- Race Drivers: Allan Moffat, Colin Bond, Gregg Hansford
- Chassis: Ford Cortina, Ford Falcon, Ford Capri, Chevrolet Monza, Mazda RX-7, Holden VL Commodore. Ford Sierra RS500
- Debut: 1966
- Drivers' Championships: 3
- 0

Allan Moffat Racing was an Australian motor racing team owned by multiple-championship winning Canadian-Australian racing driver Allan Moffat. The team was highly successful, winning races on three continents including three Australian Touring Car Championships in 1976, 1977 and 1983, four Bathurst 500/1000s including a memorable 1–2 victory in 1977, and the 1987 Monza 500, which was the inaugural race of the World Touring Car Championship.

== History ==
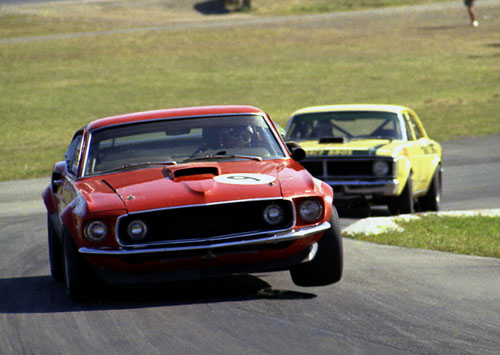
Allan Moffat racing the Trans-Am Ford Mustang at Lakeside International Raceway in October 1972

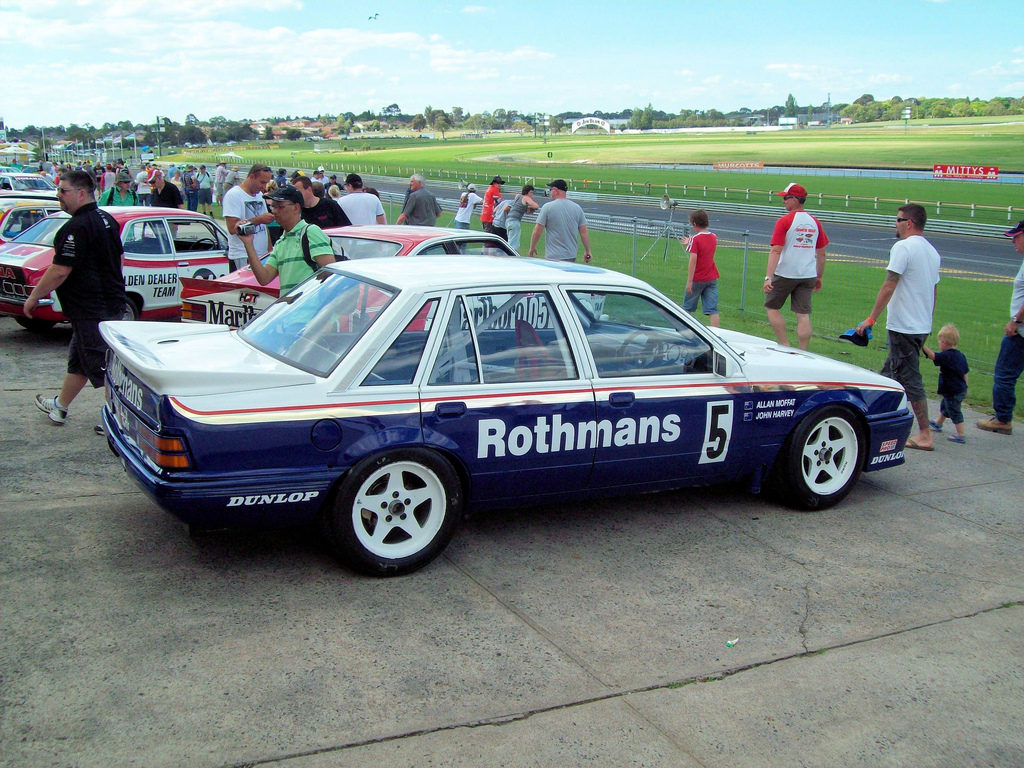
Holden VL Commodore SS Group A campaigned in the 1987 World Touring Car Championship on display at Sandown Raceway in November 2009

Allan Moffat Racing was at various times the official factory team for Ford and Mazda in Australian touring car motor racing as well as racing Holdens and Chevrolets. The team also raced cars in other categories like Sports Sedans. Founded in the mid-1960s to support Moffat's touring car racing efforts, the team was closely aligned with Ford Australia's in-house racing team until it was wound up in 1973 (Moffat doubled as the works team's lead driver primarily driving GTHO Falcons). Moffat's early success with the team included running the Trans-Am Ford Mustang he was given as a gift from Ford's American 'in-house' race car fabrication and engineering facility "Kar Kraft", with the car finished by Bud Moore Engineering. With this car Moffat and his team won an incredible 101 of the 151 events entered, though surprisingly he was not able to secure the Australian Touring Car Championship with the Mustang, losing out twice to the Chevrolet Camaro ZL-1 of Bob Jane in 1971 and 1972.

Ford withdrew its factory team from motor racing after 1973 (during which time Moffat won his first ATCC and the first Bathurst 1000 for the factory team) and Allan Moffat Racing became the leading Ford team in Australian touring car racing, with Moffat winning the ATCC in 1976 and 1977, as well as the famous 1–2 win in the 1977 Hardie-Ferodo 1000 at Bathurst when he was partnered by multiple 24 Hours of Le Mans winner Jacky Ickx. During this time, Moffat also raced in the Australian Sports Sedan Championship, winning the inaugural national title in 1976 driving both a Ford Capri RS3100 and (in a shock to Ford fans), a DeKon built Chevrolet Monza.

By 1977, Ford was giving backdoor assistance to the team for its touring car efforts, but once again pulled out of racing at the end of 1978. This saw the team privately enter Falcons in both the 1979 and 1980 Bathurst 1000's. Moffat also continued to race his Monza in Sports Sedans to some success.

Following Ford's decision to withdraw from Australian motorsport, in 1981 Allan Moffat Racing became the factory Mazda team racing the RX-7 until 1984. Although there were accusations that the RX-7 was a sports car and not a touring car (including Moffat's former Works Team boss, Howard Marsden, who by the 1980s led Nissan's racing program in Australia), Moffat was able to win the 1983 ATCC (his 4th and last title) as well as finishing second at Bathurst in 1983 and third in 1984, the last year of the locally developed Group C Touring Car rules. Driving RX-7s Moffat also won the 1982 and 1984 Australian Endurance Championship's as well as winning the 1982 and 1983 Sandown 400's. Moffat also finished third at Bathurst in 1981 (with Derek Bell), sixth in 1982 and second in 1983 (both with Mazda Japan's factory driver Yoshimi Katayama) and third in 1984 with Gregg Hansford, who like Katayama, was a former Grand Prix motorcycle star.

1984 was a tough year for Allan Moffat Racing. Moffat only finished 9th in that years ATCC after a horror crash in Round 4, at Surfers Paradise, in the wet after colliding with the Ford XD Falcon of Garry Willmington at the end of the main straight, which sent the Moffat Mazda off the track at high speed. The car hit a tree stump (hidden by grass) which saw Moffat suffer a broken hand, a fractured sternum and heavy bruising. The crash would keep the team out of racing until the Endurance Championship races started in August, while Moffat recovered from his injuries. At the time of his crash, Moffat had been sitting 3rd in the ATCC (behind Peter Brock, who would miss two rounds while racing at Le Mans, and eventual champion Dick Johnson) after a 3rd at Sandown, DNF at Symmons Plains and a win at Wanneroo and still considered the favourite to retain his 1983 title.

With the arrival of Group A regulations in 1985 the RX-7 proved uncompetitive and Moffat sat out the season, racing only once in his Bathurst RX-7 at the 24 Hours of Daytona, although Moffat did test a Mazda 929 at Calder in late 1984, before Mazda decided to withdraw the cars due to uncompetitive times. Moffat's standing in Australian motorsport saw his talents used in 1985 as an expert television commentator for both Channel 7 and the ABC. In 1986, Moffat joined long-time rival Peter Brock's Holden Dealer Team to race a Holden VK Commodore SS Group A in the European Touring Car Championship and the late season Australian Endurance Championship races which included Sandown and Bathurst.

Following an off-season split between Brock and Holden in February 1987, Moffat left the team and hurriedly reassembled Allan Moffat Racing for the inaugural World Touring Car Championship with a Holden VL Commodore SS Group A purchased covertly from Brock. Complete with sponsorship from Rothmans, the team competed in the opening three rounds with Moffat and John Harvey winning the opening Monza 500 race, after the leading six factory BMW M3s were disqualified, before returning for round 5 to finish fourth outright and first in class at the Spa 24 Hour.

Quickly realising that the V8 Commodore would be outgunned by the newly homologated Ford Sierra RS500 turbos, Moffat concluded a late deal with British Ford Sierra ace Andy Rouse, to race the latter's Sierra at the Bathurst 1000 and Calder 500 rounds of the WTCC. The experience was an unhappy one though as Moffat did not get to drive in either race, with the Sierra expiring under Rouse before his first stints at the wheel were scheduled to finish. Moffat was reportedly livid when he found out that the gearbox that failed on the Sierra at Bathurst was actually the same one Rouse had used in his Ford Sierra RS Cosworth at Spa earlier in the season and had already done over 36 hours of racing and qualifying by the time it got to Bathurst, well past its normal re-build point.

Despite the unhappy experience with Rouse machinery, at the Wanneroo Park round in 1988, Moffat debuted an Eggenberger Motorsport built RS500 with team principal Ruedi Eggenberger and driver Klaus Niedzwiedz often joining the team for the Bathurst 1000 over the next few years. Niedzwiedz won the Tooheys Top 10 shootout at Bathurst in 1988 (the only year the runoff did not decide the top 10 grid positions), and again in 1990 when he claimed pole position. Niedzwiedz and fellow German Frank Biela finished second for Moffat in the 1989 Tooheys 1000 at Bathurst.

Before the 1988 Tooheys 1000, the Moffat team's last Australian win, and indeed Allan Moffat's last win on Australian soil, came in the 1988 Enzed 500 at Sandown driving the Eggenberger built Sierra. Moffat and Gregg Hansford won in what was Moffat's first drive in the Sandown enduro in a Ford since 1979 and his first win in the traditional pre-Bathurst enduro since 1983. It was also the 6th Sandown endurance win of Allan Moffat's career and Gregg Hansford's first major touring car victory since the pair shared won the 1984 Valvoline 250 at Oran Park in Sydney.

The teams' (and indeed Moffat's own) final race win was in the Fuji 500 in Japan in 1989. The Sierra, again with Eggenberger in charge of the preparation and with Niedzwiedz and Moffat driving, wore the number 39 designating the year of Moffat's birth (1939) and that he intended to retire from race driving after the race (Allan Moffat had made a promise to his wife Pauline that he would retire once he turned 50. The Fuji race was held just two days after his 50th birthday). The team's final appearance in the Australian Touring Car Championship was in 1990 with Gregg Hansford driving a Sierra. From then on, the team's appearances were restricted to the Bathurst 1000, with two RS500s until 1992, and until its final appearance in 1996, a sole Ford EB Falcon V8.

== Championship results ==
Season	Series	Position	Car	Team name
1965	Australian Touring Car Championship	4th	Ford Cortina Lotus	Allan Moffat Racing
1970	Australian Touring Car Championship	6th	Ford Mustang Boss 302	Team Coca-Cola A.M.R.
1971	Australian Touring Car Championship	2nd	Ford Mustang Boss 302	Team Coca-Cola A.M.R.
1972	Australian Touring Car Championship	3rd	Ford Mustang Boss 302	Allan Moffat Racing
1973	Australian Touring Car Championship	1st	Ford XY Falcon GTHO Phase III	Allan Moffat Racing
1973	Toby Lee Series	5th	Ford Mustang Boss 302	Allan Moffat Racing
1974	Australian Touring Car Championship	3rd	Ford XB Falcon GT	Moffat Ford Dealers
1974	Toby Lee Series	10th	Ford Mustang Boss 302	Allan Moffat Racing
1975	Australian Touring Car Championship	22nd	Ford XB Falcon GT	Allan Moffat Racing
1976	Australian Touring Car Championship	1st	Ford XB Falcon GT	Moffat Ford Dealers
1976	Australian Sports Sedan Championship	1st	Ford Capri RS3100; Chevrolet Monza	Allan Moffat Racing
1977	Australian Touring Car Championship	1st	Ford XB Falcon GT; Ford XC Falcon GS500	Moffat Ford Dealers
1977	Australian Sports Sedan Championship	17th	Ford Capri RS3100	Allan Moffat Racing
1978	Australian Touring Car Championship	4th	Ford XC Falcon GS500	Moffat Ford Dealers
1979	Australian Touring Car Championship	27th	Ford XC Falcon Cobra	Allan Moffat Racing
1979	Australian Sports Sedan Championship	7th	Chevrolet Monza	Allan Moffat Racing
1980	Australian Sports Sedan Championship	13th	Chevrolet Monza; Mazda RX-7	Allan Moffat Racing
1982	Australian Touring Car Championship	3rd	Mazda RX-7	Peter Stuyvesant International Racing
1982	Australian Endurance Championship	1st	Mazda RX-7	Peter Stuyvesant International Racing
1983	Australian Touring Car Championship	1st	Mazda RX-7	Peter Stuyvesant International Racing
1983	Australian Endurance Championship	4th	Mazda RX-7	Peter Stuyvesant International
1984	Australian Touring Car Championship	9th	Mazda RX-7	Peter Stuyvesant International Racing
1984	Australian Endurance Championship	1st	Mazda RX-7	Peter Stuyvesant International Racing
1986	FIA Touring Car Championship	NC	Holden VK Commodore SS Group A	Holden Dealer Team
1986	Australian Endurance Championship	13th	Holden VK Commodore SS Group A	Holden Dealer Team
1987	World Touring Car Championship	NC	Holden VL Commodore SS Group A Ford Sierra RS500	Allan Moffat Racing
1988	Australian Touring Car Championship	9th	Ford Sierra RS500	Allan Moffat Enterprises
1989	Australian Touring Car Championship	11th	Ford Sierra RS500	Allan Moffat Enterprises

== Bathurst 1000 Win ==
Year	Class	No	Drivers	Chassis	Laps
Year	Class	No	Drivers	Engine	Laps
1977	3001cc – 6000cc	1	(Canada) Allan Moffat (Belgium) Jacky Ickx	Ford XC Falcon GS500 Hardtop	163
1977	3001cc – 6000cc	1	(Canada) Allan Moffat (Belgium) Jacky Ickx	Ford 351 5.8 L V8	163

== Sandown Endurance Wins ==
Year	Class	No	Drivers	Chassis	Laps
Year	Class	No	Drivers	Engine	Laps
1974	D	33	(Canada) Allan Moffat	Ford XB Falcon GT Hardtop	130
1974	D	33	(Canada) Allan Moffat	Ford 351 5.8 L V8	130
1982	D	43	(Canada) Allan Moffat	Mazda RX-7	109
1982	D	43	(Canada) Allan Moffat	Mazda 12A Rotary	109
1983	Over 3000cc	43	(Canada) Allan Moffat	Mazda RX-7	129
1983	Over 3000cc	43	(Canada) Allan Moffat	Mazda 13B Rotary	129
1988	D	9	(Canada) Allan Moffat (Australia) Gregg Hansford	Ford Sierra RS500	129
1988	D	9	(Canada) Allan Moffat (Australia) Gregg Hansford	Ford Cosworth YBD 2.0 L I4 turbo	129

== Endurance Wins ==
Other touring car endurance race wins by Allan Moffat Racing include:

- 1977 Rothmans 250 at Adelaide International Raceway – Allan Moffat (Ford XC Falcon GS500 Hardtop)
- 1977 Rothmans 300 at Surfers Paradise – Allan Moffat (Ford XC Falcon GS500 Hardtop)
- 1981 International Resort 300 at Surfers Paradise – Allan Moffat (Mazda RX-7)
- 1982 Gold Coast 300 at Surfers Paradise – Allan Moffat (Mazda RX-7)
- 1982 Nissan-Datsun 300 at Adelaide International Raceway – Allan Moffat (Mazda RX-7)
- 1984 Valvoline 250 at Oran Park Raceway – Allan Moffat and Gregg Hansford (Mazda RX-7)
- 1987 Monza 500 at Autodromo Nazionale Monza (Italy) – Allan Moffat and John Harvey (Holden VL Commodore SS Group A) – World Touring Car Championship
- 1989 Inter-Tec 500 at Fuji Speedway (Japan) – Klaus Niedzwiedz and Allan Moffat (Ford Sierra RS500)

Although not a win for AMR, Allan Moffat also drove to outright victory for the BMW Motorsport team in the 1975 12 Hours of Sebring driving a BMW 3.0 CSL alongside Hans-Joachim Stuck and Brian Redman.

Moffat and John Harvey also drove their Holden VL Commodore SS Group A to 4th outright and first in Div.3 at the 1987 Spa 24 Hours.

== Drivers ==
Other than Moffat himself, those who drove for Allan Moffat Racing over the years are as follows (in order of appearance):

- (Australia) John French (1970)
- (West Germany) Dieter Glemser (1974)
- (Australia) Ian Geoghegan (1975)
- (Australia) Vern Schuppan (1976)
- (Australia) Colin Bond (1977–1978)
- (Belgium) Jacky Ickx (1977–1978)
- (Australia) Alan Hamilton (1977)
- (Australia) Fred Gibson (1978)
- (United Kingdom) John Fitzpatrick (1979–1980)
- (United Kingdom) Derek Bell (1981)
- (Japan) Yoshimi Katayama (1982–1983)
- (Australia) Gregg Hansford (1982–1984, 1988–1990, 1992)
- (Australia) Lucio Cesario (1982)
- (Australia) Garry Waldon (1983)
- (Australia) Peter McLeod (1985)
- (Australia) Kevin Bartlett (1985)
- (Australia) John Harvey (1987)
- (United Kingdom) Andy Rouse (1987)
- (Belgium) Thierry Tassin (1987)
- (West Germany) Klaus Niedzwiedz (1988–1990, 1992, 1996)
- (West Germany) Frank Biela (1989–1990)
- (Belgium) Pierre Dieudonné (1989–1990)
- (Australia) Charlie O'Brien (1991–1993)
- (Italy) Gianfranco Brancatelli (1991)
- (Australia) Gary Brabham (1991)
- (New Zealand) Steve Millen (1991)
- (Australia) Andrew Miedecke (1993–1995)
- (United Kingdom) Jeff Allam (1994)
- (Australia) Mark Noske (1995)
- (Australia) Ken Douglas (1996)

== Results ==
=== Car No. 9 results ===
Year	Driver	No.	Make	1	2	3	4	5	6	7	8	9	10	11	12	13	14	15	16	17	18	19	20	21	22	23	24	25	26	27	28	29	30	Position	Pts
1970	Allan Moffat	9/44	Ford	CAL; R1; 1	BAT; R2; Ret	SAN; R3; 3	MAL; R4; Ret	WAR; R5; Ret	LAK; R6; Ret	SYM; R7; DNS																								6th	13
1971	Allan Moffat	9/91	Ford	SYM; R1; 1	CAL; R2; Ret	SAN; R3; DSQ	SUR; R4; 1	MAL; R5; 3	LAK; R6; 1	ORA; R7; 2																								2nd	37
1972	Allan Moffat	9	Ford	SYM; R1; 1	CAL; R2; Ret	BAT; R3; 2	SAN; R4; 1	ADE; R4; 4	WAR; R6; DSQ	SUR; R7; 10	ORA; R8; 1																							3rd	53
1973	Allan Moffat	9	Ford	SYM; R1; 1	CAL; R2; 1	SAN; R3; 1	BAR; R4; 1	SUR; R5; 3	ADE; R6; 2	ORA; R7; 1	WAR; R8; Ret																							1st	80
1974	Allan Moffat	33	Ford	SYM; R1; 2	CAL; R2; 4	SAN; R3; 1	AMA; R4; 9	ORA; R5; 1	SUR; R6	ADE; R7																								3rd	39
1975	Allan Moffat	9	Ford	SYM; R1; 5	CAL; R2; Ret	AMA; R3; Ret	ORA; R4	SUR; R5	SAN; R6; C	ADE; R7	LAK; R8																							23rd	2
1976	Allan Moffat	2/9	Ford	SYM; R1; 6	CAL; R2; 1	ORA; R3; 1	SAN; R4; Ret	AMA; R5; 2	ADE; R6; 1	LAK; R7; 2	SAN; R8; 2	ADE; R9; 4	SUR; R10; 2	PHI; R11																				1st	80
1977	Allan Moffat	1	Ford	SYM; R1; 1	CAL; R2; 1	ORA; R3; 1	AMA; R4; 1	SAN; R5; 1	ADE; R6; 2	LAK; R7; Ret	SAN; R8; 3	ADE; R9; 1	SUR; R10; 1	PHI; R11																				1st	106 (114)

=== Car No. 31 results ===
Year	Driver	No.	Make	1	2	3	4	5	6	7	8	9	10	11	12	13	14	15	16	17	18	19	20	21	22	23	24	25	26	27	28	29	30	Position	Pts
1977	Colin Bond	2	Ford	SYM; R1; 2	CAL; R2; 2	ORA; R3; 8	AMA; R4; 2	SAN; R5; 2	ADE; R6; 1	LAK; R7; 2	SAN; R8; 5	ADE; R9; 2	SUR; R10; Ret	PHI; R11; 5																				2nd	74 (76)
