= 1982 Australian Endurance Championship =

Seasons
- ← 1981 1983 →

The 1982 Australian Endurance Championship was a CAMS sanctioned Australian motor racing championship for Group C Touring Cars. It was the second Australian Endurance Championship and the first to incorporate titles for both drivers and makes. The Drivers title was awarded to Allan Moffat and the Makes title to Nissan.

== Schedule ==
The championship was contested over a five round series.

Round	Race	Circuit	Date	Winning driver(s)	Car	Report
1	Perrier Gold Cup	Oran Park	22 August	(Australia) Bob Morris	Ford XE Falcon	
2	Castrol 400	Sandown	12 September	(Canada) Allan Moffat	Mazda RX-7	Report
3	James Hardie 1000	Mount Panorama, Bathurst	3 October	(Australia) Peter Brock (Australia) Larry Perkins	Holden VH Commodore SS	Report
4	Gold Coast 300	Surfers Paradise	7 November	(Canada) Allan Moffat	Mazda RX-7	
5	Nissan-Datsun 300	Adelaide International Raceway	5 December	(Canada) Allan Moffat	Mazda RX-7	

== Classes ==
Cars competed in four engine capacity classes:

- Up to 1600cc
- 1601 to 2000cc
- 2001 to 3000cc
- 3001 to 6000cc

== Points system ==
Drivers points were awarded on a 9-6-4-3-2-1 basis for the six best placed cars in each class at each round.

Makes points were awarded for the six best placed cars in each class on a 9-6-4-3-2-1 basis, but only for the highest scoring car of each make, regardless of class, at each round.

== Results ==
=== Drivers ===
Position	Driver	No.	Car	Class	Entrant	Ora	San	Bat	Sur	Ade	Total
1	Allan Moffat	43	Mazda RX-7	3001 to 6000cc	Peter Stuyvesant International	-	9	1	9	9	28
2	Bob Holden	63 & 13	Ford Escort	1601 to 2000cc	Bob Holden Motors Manly Vale	9	-	9	4	4	26
3	Fred Gibson	56	Nissan Bluebird Turbo	2001 to 3000cc	Nissan Motor Co	-	9	-	6	9	24
4	George Fury	55	Nissan Bluebird Turbo	2001 to 3000cc	Nissan Motor Co	6	-	-	9	6	21
5	Arthur Abrahams	90	Ford Escort Mexico	Up to 1600cc	Arthur Abrahams	9	-	-	-	9	18
6	Dick Johnson	17	Ford XE Falcon	3001 to 6000cc	Palmer Tube Mills	6	4	-	6	-	16
7	Alexandra Surplice	71	Toyota Corolla Levin	Up to 1600cc	Alexandra Surplice	6	-	-	9	-	15
7	Peter Brock	05	Holden VH Commodore SS	3001 to 6000cc	Marlboro Holden Dealer Team	-	-	9	-	6	15
7	John White	65	Isuzu Gemini ZZ	1601 to 2000cc	John White	-	-	-	6	9	15
10	Brian Parmenter	32	Ford Capri V6	2001 to 3000cc	Brian Parmenter	9	3	-	1	-	13
10	Martin Power	59	Triumph Dolomite	1601 to 2000cc	Jagparts	-	4	-	3	6	13
12	Allan Grice	4	Holden VH Commodore SS	3001 to 6000cc	Re-Car Racing	-	6	6	-	-	12
13	Barry Seton	50	Ford Capri V6	2001 to 3000cc	Barry Seton	4	-	6	-	-	10
14	Bob Morris	7	Ford XE Falcon	3001 to 6000cc	Seiko Watches	9	-	-	-	-	9
14	Jim Faneco	68	Isuzu Gemini	Up to 1600cc	Country Dealer Team	-	9	-	-	-	9
14	Graeme Bailey	61	Toyota Celica	1601 to 2000cc	Chickadee Chicken	-	9	-	-	-	9
14	Masahiro Hasemi	56	Nissan Bluebird Turbo	2001 to 3000cc	Nissan Motor Co	-	-	9	-	-	9
14	Steve Land	61	Toyota Celica	1601 to 2000cc	Chickadee Chicken	-	-	-	9	-	9
14	Larry Perkins	05	Holden VH Commodore SS	3001 to 6000cc	Marlboro Holden Dealer Team	-	-	9	-	-	9
14	Kazuyoshi Hoshino	56	Nissan Bluebird Turbo	2001 to 3000cc	Nissan Motor Co	-	-	9	-	-	9
14	Neville Bridges	63	Ford Escort	1601 to 2000cc	Bob Holden Motors Manly Vale	-	-	9	-	-	9
14	James Myhill	49	Mazda RX-3	2001 to 3000cc	Jim Myhill	-	6	-	-	3	9
23	Brian Winsall	87	Isuzu Gemini PF50	Up to 1600cc	Pakenham Auto Club	-	2	-	-	6	8
24	John Harvey	25	Holden VH Commodore SS	3001 to 6000cc	Marlboro Holden Dealer Team	-	3	4	-	-	7
25	Tony Mulvihill	64	Ford Escort	1601 to 2000cc	Bob Holden Motors City of Bathurst	6	-	-	-	-	6
25	Ian Burrell	76	Mitsubishi Colt	Up to 1600cc	Eastside Mitsubishi	-	6	-	-	-	6
25	Peter Beninca	66	Alfa Romeo GTV	1601 to 2000cc	Beninca Motors	-	6	-	-	-	6
25	Rob Shute	76	Mitsubishi Colt	Up to 1600cc	Eastside Mitsubishi	-	-	-	6	-	6
25	Alan Browne	4	Holden VH Commodore SS	3001 to 6000cc	Re-Car Racing	-	-	6	-	-	6
25	Don Smith	50	Ford Capri V6	2001 to 3000cc	Barry Seton	-	-	6	-	-	6
25	Wally Scott	57	Toyota Celica	1601 to 2000cc	Walter Scott	-	-	6	-	-	6
25	Peter Walton	57	Toyota Celica	1601 to 2000cc	Walter Scott	-	-	6	-	-	6
25	Terry Sheil	37	Mazda RX-7	3001 to 6000cc	Eurocars Mazda	-	2	-	4	-	6
25	Chris Heyer	53	Audi 5+5	2001 to 3000cc	Chris Heyer's Kingswood Import Centre	-	-	3	3	-	6
35	Lester Smerdon	83	Isuzu Gemini PF50	Up to 1600cc	L Smerdon	-	1	-	4	-	5
35	Jim Richards	31	BMW 635 CSi	3001 to 6000cc	JPS Team BMW	-	3	2	-	-	5
37	Peter McLeod	40	Mazda RX-7	3001 to 6000cc	Strongbow Racing Team	4	-	-	-	-	4
37	Peter Boston	74	Isuzu Gemini PF50	Up to 1600cc	P Boston	-	4	-	-	-	4
37	Gary Scott	25	Holden VH Commodore SS	3001 to 6000cc	Marlboro Holden Dealer Team	-	-	4	-	-	4
37	Les Grose	54	Ford Capri V6	2001 to 3000cc	Les Grose	-	-	4	-	-	4
37	Alan Cant	54	Ford Capri V6	2001 to 3000cc	Les Grose	-	-	4	-	-	4
37	Tony Kavich	30	Mazda RX-7	3001 to 6000cc	Bangalow Motors Pty Ltd	-	-	-	4	-	4
37	Murray Carter	18	Ford XE Falcon	3001 to 6000cc	John Sands	-	-	-	-	4	4
37	Colin Spencer	77	Isuzu Gemini	Up to 1600cc	Colin Spencer	-	-	-	-	4	4
37	John Faulkner	32	Ford Capri V6	2001 to 3000cc	Brian Parmenter	-	-	-	-	4	4
37	Clive Benson-Brown	11	Holden VH Commodore SS	3001 to 6000cc	Soundwave Discos	-	1	-	-	3	4
37	Terry Finnigan	2	Holden VC Commodore; Holden VH Commodore SS	3001 to 6000cc	Terry Finnigan	2	-	-	2	-	4
48	Ian Wells	97	Mitsubishi Lancer	Up to 1600cc	I Wells	-	3	-	-	-	3
48	Peter Janson	3	Holden VH Commodore SS	3001 to 6000cc	Cadbury Schweppes	-	-	3	-	-	3
48	David Parsons	3	Holden VH Commodore SS	3001 to 6000cc	Cadbury Schweppes	-	-	3	-	-	3
48	Peter Lander	53	Audi 5+5	2001 to 3000cc	Chris Heyer's Kingswood Import Centre	-	-	3	-	-	3
48	Steve Masterton	2	Ford XE Falcon	3001 to 6000cc	Masterton Homes Pty Ltd	-	-	-	3	-	3
48	John Murden	14	Ford Escort	Up to 1600cc	Bob Holden Motors Manly Vale	-	-	-	-	3	3
54	Ray Gulson	64	Alfa Romeo GTV6	2001 to 3000cc	Ray Gulson	-	-	2	-	-	2
54	David Hobbs	31	BMW 635 CSi	3001 to 6000cc	JPS Team BMW	-	-	2	-	-	2
54	Bruce Lynton	64	Alfa Romeo GTV6	2001 to 3000cc	Ray Gulson	-	-	2	-	-	2
54	Bernie Stack	38	Holden VH Commodore SS	3001 to 6000cc	Gawler Body Works	-	-	-	-	2	2
58	Paul Jones	44	Mazda RX-7	3001 to 6000cc	Ron Horner	1	-	-	-	-	1
58	Yoshimi Katayama	43	Mazda RX-7	3001 to 6000cc	Peter Stuyvesant International	-	-	1	-	-	1
58	Barry Lawrence	28	Holden VH Commodore SS	3001 to 6000cc	Bayside Spare Parts	-	-	-	1	-	1
58	Gerry Burges	34	Mazda RX-7	3001 to 6000cc	BF Goodrich Australia	-	-	-	-	1	1

=== Makes ===
Position	Make	Car	Ora	San	Bat	Sur	Ade	Total
1	Nissan	Nissan Bluebird Turbo	6	9	9	9	9	42
2	Ford	Ford XE Falcon, Ford Capri & Ford Escort	9	4	9	6	9	37
3	Mazda	Mazda RX-7	4	9	1	9	9	32
4	Toyota	Toyota Corolla Levin & Toyota Celica	6	9	6	9	-	30
5	Holden	Holden VC Commodore & Holden VH Commodore	2	6	9	2	6	25
6	Isuzu	Gemini	-	9	-	6	9	24
7	Triumph	Dolomite	-	4	-	3	6	13
8	Mitsubishi	Mitsubishi Lancer & Colt	-	6	-	6	-	12
9	Alfa Romeo	Alfa Romeo GTV & GTV6	-	6	2	2	-	10
10	Audi	Audi 5+5	-	-	3	3	-	6
11	BMW	BMW 635 CSi	3	-	2	-	-	5
