= 1982 James Hardie 1000 =

Motor race in Australia

Seasons
- ← 1981 1983 →

Layout of the Mount Panorama Circuit (1938–1986)

The 1982 James Hardie 1000 was the 23rd running of the Bathurst 1000 touring car race. It was held on 3 October 1982 at the Mount Panorama Circuit just outside Bathurst in New South Wales, Australia. The race, which was Round 3 of both the 1982 Australian Endurance Championship and the 1982 Australian Endurance Championship of Makes, was open to cars eligible to the locally developed CAMS Group C touring car regulations with two engine capacity based classes.

The race was won by Peter Brock and Larry Perkins of the Holden Dealer Team driving a Holden Commodore. It was Brock's sixth victory, a record, the Holden Dealer Team's sixth win and the first win in the race for a car carrying a Racecam unit. Holden Commodores filled the top four positions, but only after Dick Johnson was disqualified after originally finishing in fourth spot. Brock and Perkins finished a lap ahead of Allan Grice and Alan Browne. It was the second time Grice had finished second but had yet to win. The second Holden Dealer Team Commodore of John Harvey and Gary Scott finished third, equalling the best previous performance of the HDT, their first in 1969.

== Class structure ==
=== Class A ===
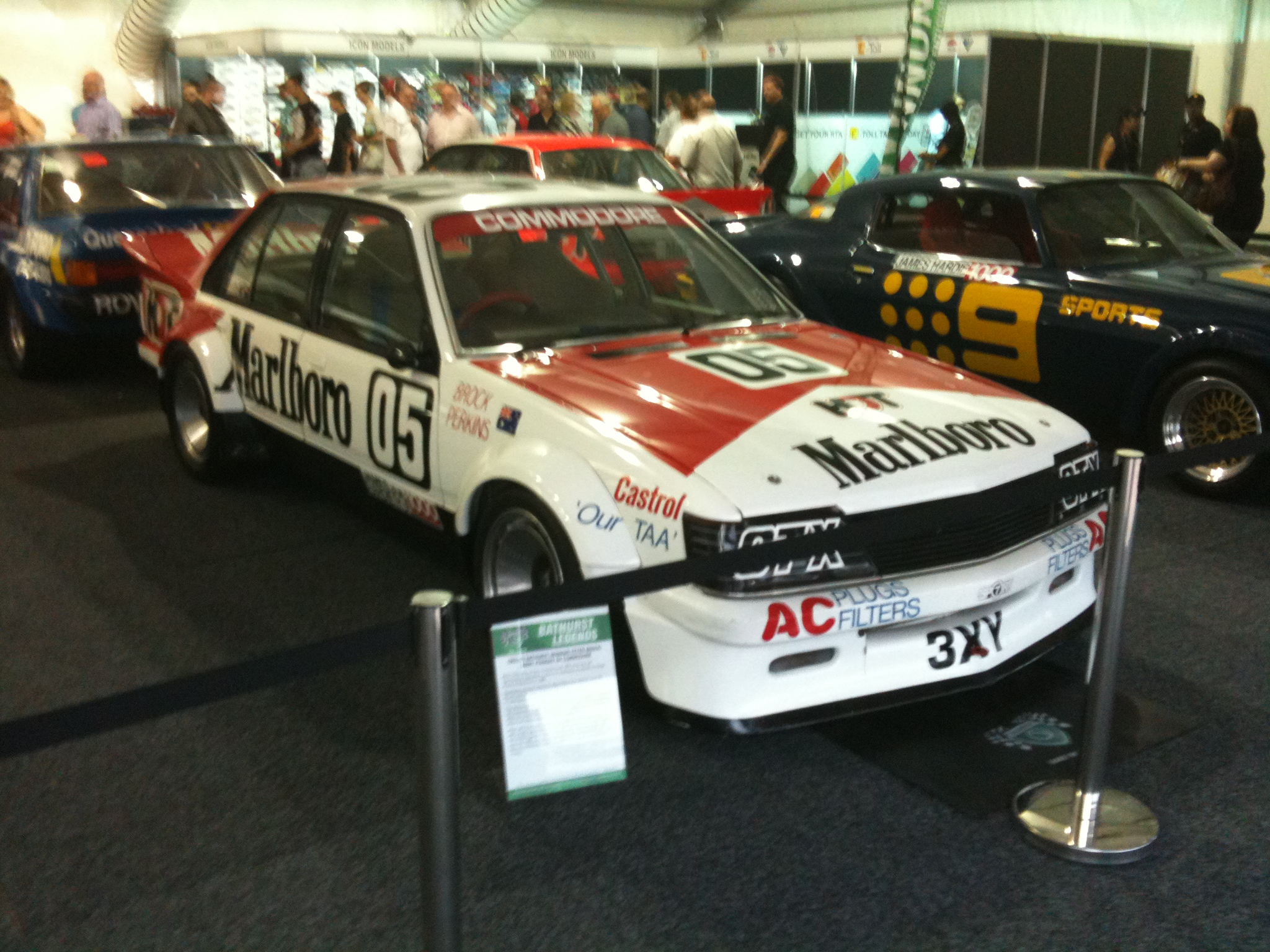
The race winning Holden Commodore VH SS, pictured in 2010

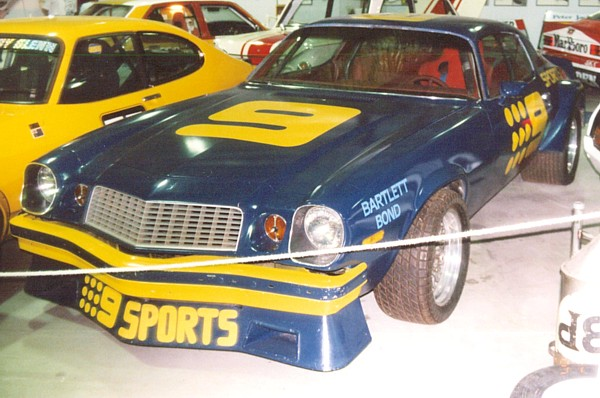
Bartlett/Bond Chevrolet Camaro

Officially designated as the Over 3000cc class, it featured the V8 Holden Commodores, Ford Falcons and Chevrolet Camaros. Also in this class were the Mazda RX-7s, the factory supported BMW 635CSis and a Jaguar XJS.

=== Class B ===
Officially designated as the Under 3000cc class, it featured the turbo charged Nissan Bluebirds, considerably quicker than the opposition made up of Ford Capris, Alfa Romeo GTV6s, and an Audi 5+5, plus cars from the previously featured 2.0 litre class such as Toyota Celicas, Ford Escorts and Isuzu Geminis.

As a round of the Australian Endurance Championship there was also a secondary class structure applied which divided cars into four engine capacity classes.

- Up to 1600cc
- 1601 to 2000cc
- 2001 to 3000cc
- 3001 to 6000cc

There were no starters in the Up to 1600cc class.

== Hardies Heroes ==
In official qualifying, Re-Car team owner and driver Alan Browne put up a $5,000 reward for the first Touring Car driver to break the 100 mph (160 km/h) average lap barrier. The favourite to win the money was the Bathurst pole winner of the past two years, Kevin Bartlett in his 500 bhp (373 kW; 507 PS) V8 Chevrolet Camaro Z28 (Bartlett had actually set the very first 100 mph lap of Bathurst during the 1967 Easter meeting when driving a 2.5 L Coventry Climax powered Brabham BT16 for Alec Mildren). However, when his co-driver Colin Bond crashed the car due to a tyre blowout, the subsequent repairs put the Camaro's preparation a day behind and its chance was gone.

The Holden Dealer Team had announced Peter Brock to have broken the barrier in qualifying and Browne actually congratulated Brock. However it was revealed that Brock's time of 2:18.1 fell short of 100 mph average. Coincidentally it was Browne's co-driver Allan Grice who pocketed the cash in Friday's qualifying session with a time of 2:17.8 to set the first ever 100 mph lap of the 6.172 km Mount Panorama circuit.

After qualifying 31st and 43rd in 1981, the appearance of the Nissan Bluebird Turbos in the top 10 in qualifying came as a surprise to the V8 fraternity which had dominated the race since 1967, and was a sign of things to come at Bathurst. From 1983, turbo powered cars would qualify first or second in every year other than 1985 until CAMS banned turbos at the end of 1992, with 1983 (Brock in a V8 Holden Commodore VH SS), and 1985 (Tom Walkinshaw's V12 Jaguar XJS) being the only years a turbo powered car did not qualify on pole at Bathurst. The turbos prime year would come in 1989 when all 10 cars in the Saturday morning runoff were turbo powered (nine Fords and one Nissan). Also surprising the V8 runners was four time race winner Allan Moffat who qualified his rotary powered Mazda RX-7 in Hardies Heroes for the second year running.

Pos	No	Team	Driver	Car	Time
Pole	4	Re-Car Racing	(Australia) Allan Grice	Holden Commodore VH SS	2:17.501
2	05	Marlboro Holden Dealer Team	(Australia) Peter Brock	Holden Commodore VH SS	2:17.836
3	56	Nissan	(Japan) Masahiro Hasemi	Nissan Bluebird Turbo	2:18.870
4	9	Nine Network Racing Team	(Australia) Kevin Bartlett	Chevrolet Camaro Z28	2:18.946
5	16	Re-Car Racing	(Australia) Garry Rogers	Holden Commodore VH SS	2:19.332
6	7	Seiko Watches	(Australia) Bob Morris	Ford XE Falcon	2:19.380
7	17	Palmer Tube Mills	(Australia) Dick Johnson	Ford XE Falcon	2:19.549
8	43	Peter Stuyvesant International Racing	(Canada) Allan Moffat	Mazda RX-7	2:19.761
9	25	Marlboro Holden Dealer Team	(Australia) John Harvey	Holden Commodore VH SS	2:19.764
10	55	Nissan	(Australia) George Fury	Nissan Bluebird Turbo	2:20.613

* The first and only pole position for Allan Grice at Bathurst, and the first of only two times in 26 starts between 1968 and 2002 that he qualified on the front row. He finished 2nd in the 1986 Hardies Heroes, but had been the fastest qualifier going into the runoff.
* Masahiro Hasemi became the first and (as of 2024) only Japanese driver to appear in the runoff.
* 1982 saw the first time a turbocharged car qualified for the runoff. Hasemi and former Australian Rally Champion George Fury qualified their Nissan Motorsport Bluebird Turbos 3rd and 10th respectively
* Nissan became the 5th make of car to appear in Hardies Heroes, following Holden, Ford, Chevrolet and Mazda. The Bluebirds were also the first cars in the runoff to use a 4 cyl engine.
* 1976 race winners Bob Morris and John Fitzpatrick were due to start in their Alan Jones owned Ford XE Falcon after Morris finished 6th in the runoff. Unfortunately during Saturday afternoon's final practice session, Fitzpatrick suffered a broken wheel going into Forrest's Elbow and crashed the car heavily into the bank. The damage was sufficient to see the car withdrawn from the race.

== Results ==
Pos	Class	No	Team	Drivers	Car	Laps	Qual Pos	Shootout Pos
1	A	05	Marlboro Holden Dealer Team	(Australia) Peter Brock (Australia) Larry Perkins	Holden Commodore VH SS	163	2	2
2	A	4	Re-Car Racing	(Australia) Allan Grice (Australia) Alan Browne	Holden Commodore VH SS	162	1	1
3	A	25	Marlboro Holden Dealer Team	(Australia) John Harvey (Australia) Gary Scott	Holden Commodore VH SS	162	4	9
4	A	3	Cadbury Schweppes Pty Ltd.	(New Zealand) Peter Janson (Australia) David Parsons	Holden Commodore VH SS	158	17	
5	A	31	JPS Team BMW	(New Zealand) Jim Richards (United Kingdom) David Hobbs	BMW 635 CSi	157	19	
6	A	43	Peter Stuyvesant International Racing	(Canada) Allan Moffat (Japan) Yoshimi Katayama	Mazda RX-7	156	3	8
7	A	2	Masterton Homes	(Australia) Steve Masterton (Australia) Bruce Stewart	Ford XE Falcon	155	31	
8	B	56	Nissan	(Japan) Masahiro Hasemi (Japan) Kazuyoshi Hoshino	Nissan Bluebird Turbo	153	5	3
9	A	40	Strongbow Racing Team	(Australia) Peter McLeod (Australia) Peter Dane	Mazda RX-7	153	22	
10	A	35	Ron Gillard	(Australia) Ron Gillard (Australia) Phil Alexander	Mazda RX-7	149	30	
11	A	6	Ron Dickson	(Australia) Ron Dickson (Australia) Bob Stevens	Chevrolet Camaro Z28	149	23	
12	B	50	Barry Seton	(Australia) Barry Seton (Australia) Don Smith	Ford Capri Mk.III	147	43	
13	A	30	Bangalow Motors Pty Ltd	(Australia) Tony Kavich (Australia) Phil Ward	Mazda RX-7	145	34	
14	B	54	Les Grose	(Australia) Les Grose (Australia) Alan Cant	Ford Capri Mk.III	144	48	
15	B	63	Bob Holden Motors	(Australia) Bob Holden (Australia) Neville Bridges	Ford Escort 2.0 GL	141	50	
16	B	53	Chris Heyer	(Australia) Chris Heyer (Australia) Peter Lander	Audi 5+5	139	52	
17	B	57	Walter Scott	(Australia) Walter Scott (Australia) Peter Walton	Toyota Celica	137	51	
18	A	44	Ron Horner	(Australia) Paul Jones (Australia) Bob Skelton	Mazda RX-7	137	40	
19	B	64	Ray Gulson	(Australia) Ray Gulson (Australia) Bruce Lynton	Alfa Romeo GTV6	136	54	
20	A	26	Everlast Battery Service	(Australia) Bill O'Brien (Australia) Brian Sampson	Ford XD Falcon	134	24	
21	A	12	Ron Dickson	(Australia) Geoff Leeds (Australia) Peter Fitzgerald	Chevrolet Camaro Z28	134	26	
22	A	19	Ken Mathews	(Australia) Ken Mathews (Australia) Greg Toepfer	Holden Commodore VH SS	130	36	
DSQ	A	17	Palmer Tube Mills	(Australia) Dick Johnson (Australia) John French	Ford XE Falcon	160	6	7
DSQ	A	47	Brian Callaghan Racing	(Australia) Brian Callaghan (Australia) Bob Muir	Ford XE Falcon	150	18	
DNF	A	11	Soundwave Discos	(Australia) Charlie O'Brien (United Kingdom) Clive Benson-Browne	Holden Commodore VH SS	143	28	
DNF	B	52	Hulcraft Autos	(Australia) John Craft (Australia) Russell Skaife	Ford Capri Mk.III	132	46	
DNF	A	37	Eurocars (Northside) P/L	(Australia) Terry Shiel (Australia) Peter Hopwood	Mazda RX-7	121	20	
DNF	A	49	Greg Symes	(Australia) Greg Symes (New Zealand) Bruce Smith	Holden VB Commodore	121	37	
DNF	A	10	John Goss Racing	(Australia) John Goss (United States) Bob Tullius	Jaguar XJS	119	14	
DNF	A	16	Re-Car Racing	(Australia) Ron Wanless (Australia) Garry Rogers	Holden Commodore VH SS	119	9	5
DNF	A	38	Gawler, SA	(Australia) Bernie Stack (Australia) Tony Parkinson	Holden Commodore VH SS	118	35	
NC	A	46	Rosco Rotary	(Australia) Ross Burbidge (Australia) Craig Kinmoth	Mazda RX-7	109	45	
NC	A	32	Scotty Taylor	(Australia) Alan Taylor (Australia) Kevin Kennedy	Holden VC Commodore	102	39	
NC	B	60	Country Dealer Team	(Australia) Jim Faneco (Australia) Allan Gough	Isuzu Gemini ZZ	96	53	
DNF	A	41	JPS Team BMW	(New Zealand) Denny Hulme (Australia) Stephen Brook	BMW 635 CSi	96	38	
NC	A	21	STP Roadways Racing	(Australia) Steve Harrington (Australia) Garth Wigston	Holden Commodore VH SS	90	13	
DNF	A	27	Seiko Watches	(Australia) Alan Jones (Australia) Barry Jones	Mazda RX-7	88	15	
DNF	A	20	King George Tavern	(Australia) Joe Moore (Australia) Graham Moore	Ford XE Falcon	75	42	
DNF	A	8	Garry Willmington Performance	(Australia) Garry Willmington (Australia) Mike Griffin	Ford XD Falcon	68	21	
DNF	B	61	Chickadee Chicken	(Australia) Graeme Bailey (Australia) Steve Land	Toyota Celica	65	49	
DNF	A	22	Cullen Automotive Industries	(Australia) Warren Cullen (Australia) Gary Cooke	Holden Commodore VH SS	54	11	
DNF	A	29	John Donnelly	(Australia) John Donnelly (Australia) Ian McGee	Ford XD Falcon	51	44	
DNF	A	23	Alfred Grant	(Australia) Alf Grant (New Zealand) Leo Leonard	Ford XD Falcon	48	33	
DNF	B	55	Nissan	(Australia) George Fury (Australia) Fred Gibson	Nissan Bluebird Turbo	40	7	10
DNF	A	9	Nine Network Racing Team	(Australia) Kevin Bartlett (Australia) Colin Bond	Chevrolet Camaro Z28	27	8	4
DNF	A	18	Murray Carter Racing	(Australia) Murray Carter (Australia) Rusty French	Ford XE Falcon	25	32	
DNF	A	14	John English	(Australia) John English (Australia) Paul Gulson	Ford XD Falcon	17	25	
DNF	B	51	Capri Components	(Australia) Lawrie Nelson (Australia) Peter Jones	Ford Capri Mk.III	17	41	
DNF	A	33	B.F. Goodrich Australia	(Australia) Gerry Burges (Australia) Lynn Brown	Mazda RX-7	13	47	
DNF	A	15	Terry Finnigan	(Australia) Terry Finnigan (Australia) John Gates	Holden Commodore VH SS	9	12	
DNF	A	48	Fred Geissler	(Australia) Fred Geissler (Australia) Ralph Radburn	Holden Commodore VH SS	4	29	
DNF	A	34	Penrith Mazda Centre P/L	(Australia) John Duggan (Australia) Don Bretland	Mazda RX-7	4	16	
DNF	A	28	Bayside Spares	(Australia) Barry Lawrence (Australia) Geoff Russell	Holden Commodore VH SS	1	27	
DNS	A	7	Seiko Watches	(Australia) Bob Morris (United Kingdom) John Fitzpatrick	Ford XE Falcon		10	6
DNS	B	62	Gary Leggatt	(Australia) Gary Leggatt (Australia) Phil McDonnell	Alfa Romeo GTV			
DNS	A	42	Peter Stuyvesant International Racing	(Australia) Gregg Hansford (Australia) Lucio Cesario	Mazda RX-7			
DNQ	A	24	Glenn Molloy	(Australia) Chris Hones (Australia) Ross Mathiesen	Ford XD Falcon		DNQ	
DNQ	B	58	The Daily Planet	(Australia) Craig Bradtke (Australia) Graham Harrison	Toyota Celica		DNQ	

== Statistics ==
- Provisional Pole Position - #4 Allan Grice - 2:17.8
- Pole Position - #4 Allan Grice - 2:17.501
- Fastest Lap - #05 Peter Brock - 2:20.1 (lap record)
- Average Speed - 154 km/h
- Race Time - 6:32:03.2
