= Fred Gibson (racing driver) =

Australian racing driver

- Nationality: (Australia) Australian
- Born: Frederick Charles Gibson; 16 January 1941 (age 85)
- Retired: 1983

Australian Touring Car Championship
- Years active: 1968, 1972-74, 1982-83
- Teams: Ford Works Team; Nissan Motorsport Australia
- Best finish: 4th in 1968 Australian Touring Car Championship

Championship titles
- 1967: Bathurst 1000

Awards
- 2004: V8 Supercars Hall of Fame

Frederick Charles Gibson (born 16 January 1941) is a former Australian racing driver and race team owner.

== Career ==
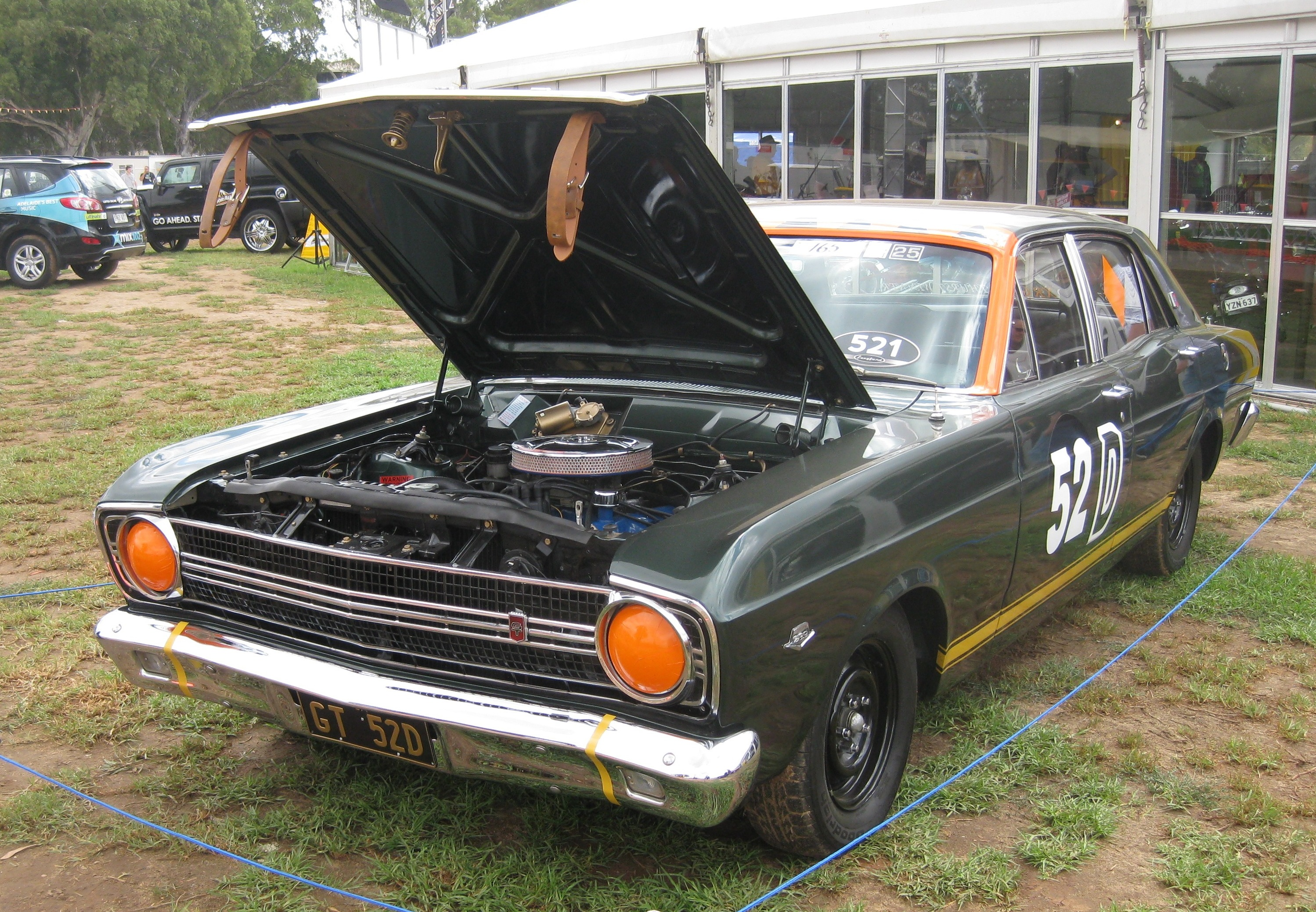
A replica of the Ford XR Falcon GT driven to victory in the 1967 Gallaher 500 by Fred Gibson and Harry Firth

After a career that began in small production sports cars, first an MGA, and later the first Lotus Elan to run in Australian competition, Gibson quickly moved up into the touring car ranks. In just his second Bathurst start he claimed second place in the 1966 Gallaher 500.

In 1967, Frank Matich, who was to co-drive one of the new Ford XR Falcon GTs at Bathurst with Harry Firth, had to pull out due to other commitments, and recommended Gibson as his replacement. Gibson first met Firth on the Thursday before the Gallaher 500 and later set the second fastest qualifying time behind their Sydney based teammates Ian and Leo Geoghegan, 1967 was the first year at Bathurst that grid positions were determined by qualifying times and not by class.

Alongside his team boss, Gibson scored his first major win, defeating the Geoghegans after a re-count of laps (the Geoghegans were flagged in 1st but a lap scoring error had been made during their first pit stop). The leading V8 Falcon GT's battled for most of the race with the Alfa Romeo 1600 GTVs, but for the first time in the history of the race, the bigger cars proved up to the challenge and went on to a strong win over the leading GTV of Doug Chivas and Max Stewart.

Gibson became a mainstay with the Ford Works Team for the next six years, taking much success at Sydney's Oran Park and Amaroo Park in particular. He won the competitive Oran Park production sedan series, the Toby Lee Series, in 1970 and 1971 driving his Falcon GTHO supported by his Sydney speedshop, Road & Track. At Bathurst however in the early 1970s, he suffered a string of retirements. When the racing industry went into decline during the 70s, Gibson raced less frequently but was a still regular at Bathurst.

In 1981, Gibson joined the newly formed Nissan touring car team, headed by his former Ford Australia boss Howard Marsden. Gibson became the team's regular number two driver alongside George Fury driving the Group C Nissan Bluebird Turbo, pioneering turbo charged touring cars in Australia. Gibson's racing involvement generally was as lead driver of the team's second car at the Sandown and Bathurst enduros, selected Australian Touring Car Championship races and at the AMSCAR series at Amaroo Park.

Gibson gave Nissan its first touring car race win in Australia (and the first turbocharged win in Australian touring car racing) when he won heats 2 and 3 of Round 3 of the 1983 AMSCAR series. After finishing second in heat 1, Gibson won the round, going on to eventually finish third in the series final pointscore.

Gibson's win in the AMSCAR round was his first major touring car win since he drove the Ford team's new XA Falcon Hardtop to win the Chesterfield 250 at the Adelaide International Raceway in 1973, giving him the distinction of being the first winner in both the Falcon Hardtop and the turbocharged Bluebird. His 1983 AMSCAR win would also prove to be the last win of Gibson's driving career.

During the early 1980s, Gibson's Road & Track business also built Group C Ford Falcons for Sydney privateer Joe Moore. The Ford XD Falcon built by Gibson and raced by Moore at the 1981 James Hardie 1000 was co-driven by Fred Gibson's wife Christine (formerly known as Christine Cole, she was a talented driver in her own right, having previously driven at Bathurst for the Holden Dealer Team, and she had finished fifth outright in the 1975 Australian Touring Car Championship finishing ahead of both Bob Morris (sixth) and defending ATCC champion Peter Brock (seventh)).

== Team Owner/Manager ==
Gibson retired from driving after 1983 and replaced Marsden as Nissan team boss at the end of 1984, overseeing the introduction of the turbocharged Nissan Skyline DR30 in 1986. Highlights included winning the Australia Touring Car Championship in 1990 and 1991 with Jim Richards and 1992 series with Mark Skaife. Richards and Skaife won the 1991 and 1992 Bathurst 1000s.

With Nissan being forced out by the new for 1993 V8 formula, Gibson Motorsport switched to Holden Commodores with Skaife winning the 1994 series. The team would go through a down period following the banning of tobacco sponsorship at the end of 1995, running only a limited program in 1997. The team returned to full-time competition in 1998 with Steven Richards and Greg Murphy winning the 1999 Bathurst 1000. At the end of 1999, Gibson sold the team to Garry Dumbrell.

In 2001, Gibson returned as the public face of Gibson Motorsport. Although initially portrayed as Gibson buying back his own team, it later emerged that it was Bob Forbes and not Fred Gibson who had bought the team, with Gibson only have purchased the franchise. A falling-out between Forbes and Gibson saw the latter leave the team after Bathurst. As Forbes owned his own franchise, Gibson sold his to Briggs Motor Sport. After leaving the team, Gibson retained ownership of the team's Dandenong workshop. It was later leased to Paul Weel Racing and today is Garry Rogers Motorsport's base.

In 2004, Gibson was inducted into the V8 Supercars Hall of Fame. In 2013, Gibson reformed Gibson Motorsport with Alan Heaphy as a race car preparer for cars participating in the Heritage Touring Cars series. Amongst its clients are the owners of former Gibson Motorsport Nissans.

== Personal life ==
In the mid-1970s, Gibson married to fellow former racing driver, Christine Gibson (née Cole); herself a successful racer, the couple have two daughters.

== Career results ==
Season	Series	Position	Car	Team
1968	Australian Drivers' Championship	9th	McLaren M4A Ford	NE Allen Comp. Pty Ltd
1968	Australian Touring Car Championship	4th	Ford Mustang	NE Allen Competition Pty Ltd
1970	Grace Brothers / Toby Lee Series	1st	Ford XW Falcon GTHO Phase I	Road & Track Services
1971	Grace Brothers / Toby Lee Series	1st	Ford XW Falcon GTHO Phase II	Road & Track Services
1972	Australian Touring Car Championship	17th	Ford XY Falcon GTHO Phase III	Road & Track Services
1973	Australian Touring Car Championship	6th	Ford XY Falcon GTHO Phase III	Road & Track Services
1974	Australian Touring Car Championship	31st	Ford XB Falcon GT Hardtop	Road & Track Services
1975	Australian Sports Car Championship	3rd	Alfa Romeo T33	Fred Gibson's Road & Track
1982	Australian Touring Car Championship	28th	Datsun Bluebird Turbo	Nissan Motor Australia
1982	Australian Endurance Championship	3rd	Nissan Bluebird Turbo	Nissan Motor Co
1982	AMSCAR Series	3rd	Nissan Bluebird Turbo	Nissan Motor Co
1983	Australian Touring Car Championship	15th	Nissan Bluebird Turbo	Nissan Motorsport Australia
1983	AMSCAR Series	3rd	Nissan Bluebird Turbo	Nissan Motorsport Australia

=== Complete Australian Touring Car Championship results ===
(key) (Races in bold indicate pole position) (Races in italics indicate fastest lap)

Year	Team	Car	1	2	3	4	5	6	7	8	DC	Points
1968	N.E. Allen Competition Pty Ltd	Ford Mustang	WAR; 4								4th	-
1972	Road & Track Auto Services	Ford XY Falcon GTHO Phase III	SYM	CAL	BAT; 4	SAN	AIR	WAR	SUR	ORA	17th	4
1973	Road & Track Auto Services	Ford XY Falcon GTHO Phase III	SYM	CAL; 2	SAN	WAN	SUR; 4	AIR	ORA; 3	WAR; Ret	6th	19
1974	Road & Track Auto Services	Ford XB Falcon GT Hardtop	SYM	CAL	SAN	AMA; DNS	ORA; 6	SUR	AIR		31st	1
1982	Nissan Motor Australia	Datsun Bluebird Turbo	SAN; 7	CAL	SYM	ORA	LAK	WAN	AIR	SUR	28th	4
1983	Nissan Motorsport Australia	Nissan Bluebird Turbo	CAL; 7	SAN; Ret	SYM	WAN	AIR	SUR	ORA; 10	LAK	15th	27

=== Complete Bathurst 500/1000 results ===
Year	Team	Co-drivers	Car	Class	Laps	Pos.	Class pos.
1963		(Australia) Ken Nicholson	Morris 850	A	89	44th	12th
1966	(Australia) Vaughan & Lane BMC	(Australia) Bill Stanley	Morris Cooper S	C	129	2nd	2nd
1967	Ford Australia	(Australia) Harry Firth	Ford XR Falcon GT	D	130	1st	1st
1968	Ford Motor Company of Australia	(Australia) Barry Seton	Ford XT Falcon GT	D	113	31st	11th
1969	Ford Australia	(Australia) Barry Seton	Ford XW Falcon GTHO	D	93	DNF	DNF
1970	Ford Motor Co of Australia	(Australia) Barry Seton	Ford XW Falcon GTHO Phase II	E	33	DNF	DNF
1971	(Australia) Road & Track Auto Services	(Australia) Barry Seton	Ford XY Falcon GTHO Phase III	E	32	DNF	DNF
1972	Ford Motor Company of Australia		Ford XY Falcon GTHO Phase III	D	22	DNF	DNF
1973	Ford Australia	(Australia) Barry Seton	Ford XA Falcon GT Hardtop	D	17	DNF	DNF
1975	Alfa Romeo Dealers Australia	(United Kingdom) John Fitzpatrick	Alfa Romeo 2000 GTV	B	12	DNF	DNF
1977	(Australia) Pioneer Electronics	(Australia) Ron Dickson	Ford XB Falcon GT Hardtop	3001cc – 6000cc	147	10th	7th
1978	(Australia) Moffat Ford Dealers	(Australia) Colin Bond	Ford XC Falcon Cobra	A	59	DNF	DNF
1979	(Australia) King George Tavern	(Australia) Joe Moore	Holden LX Torana SL/R 5000 A9X 4-Door	A	125	DNF	DNF
1980	(Australia) King George Tavern	(Australia) Joe Moore	Ford XD Falcon	3001-6000cc	51	DNF	DNF
1981	(Australia) Nissan Motor Co.	(Australia) George Fury	Nissan Bluebird Turbo	4 Cylinder	30	DNF	DNF
1982	(Australia) Nissan Motor Co.	(Australia) George Fury	Nissan Bluebird Turbo	B	40	DNF	DNF
1983	Nissan Motor Co. Australia P/L	(Australia) John French	Nissan Bluebird Turbo	A	134	22nd	20th

Sporting positions
Preceded by Bob Holden; Rauno Aaltonen	Winner of the Bathurst 500; 1967 (with Harry Firth)	Succeeded by Bruce McPhee; Barry Mulholland
