= Nissan Bluebird (910) =

Compact car model produced by Nissan (1979-1983)

Nissan/Datsun Bluebird (910)
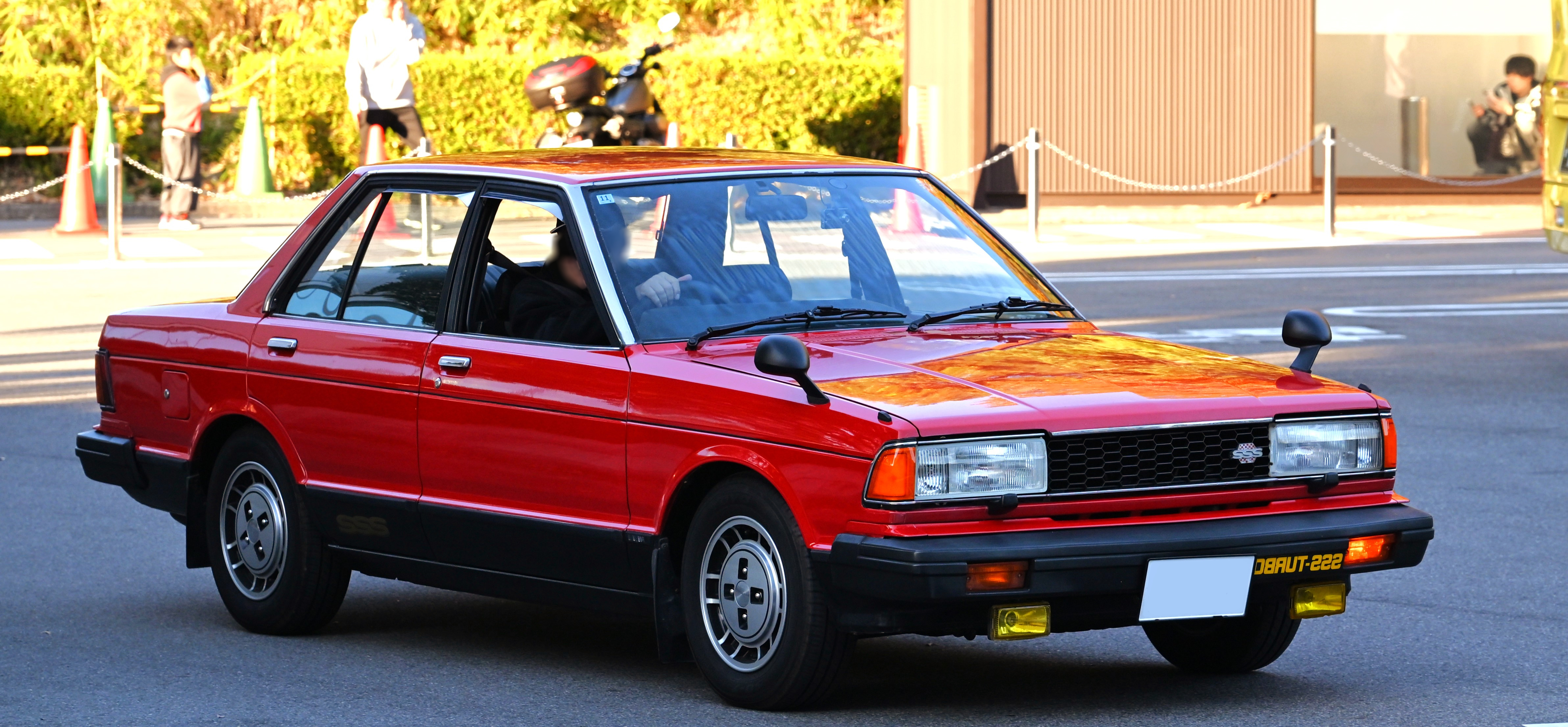
- Bluebird Turbo SSS-S sedan (910)

Overview
- Also called: Datsun 180/200B (GCC); Yue Loong Bluebird 911/912 (Taiwan)
- Production: 1979–1983; 1981–1986 (Australia)
- Assembly: Japan: Yokosuka, Kanagawa (Oppama Plant); Australia: Clayton, Victoria (Nissan Australia); New Zealand: Wiri (Nissan New Zealand); Taiwan: Miaoli (Yulon)
- Designer: Isao Sono (1976)

Body and chassis
- Body style: 4-door sedan 4-door hardtop sedan 2-door hardtop coupé 5-door station wagon
- Layout: FR layout

Powertrain
- Engine: 1.6 L L16S I4; 1.8 L L18S I4; 1.8 L L18T I4; 1.6 L Z16S I4; 1.8 L Z18E I4; 1.8 L Z18ET I4; 2.0 L Z20S I4; 2.0 L Z20E I4; 2.0 L L20B I4; 2.0 L CA20S I4; 2.0 L LD20 diesel I4

Dimensions
- Wheelbase: 2,525 mm (99.4 in)
- Length: Saloon: 4,350 mm (171.3 in); Estate and Coupe: 4,400 mm (173.2 in)
- Width: 1,650 mm (65.0 in)
- Height: Saloon and Estate: 1,400 mm (55.1 in); Coupe: 1,380 mm (54.3 in)
- Curb weight: Saloon and Coupé: 1,135 kg (2,502 lb); Estate: 1,130 kg (2,491 lb)

The Datsun Bluebird (910) is an automobile which was produced by Nissan from 1979 to 1984.

Nissan began realigning its export names with its home market names with the 910 series in November 1979. The 'B' tags were dropped in favor of 'Bluebird', though the models were marketed as 'Datsun Bluebird' initially. The Bluebird 910, which was the last rear-wheel drive Bluebird, featured simple clean-cut squared-off lines, unlike the "Coke Bottle" styling of its predecessor. It did however retain the same engine range, the same MacPherson strut suspension and the same wheelbase as the 810.

== History ==
It went on sale in Europe over the summer of 1980, where its main competitors were traditional rear-wheel drive saloons including the Ford Taunus/Cortina and Opel Ascona/Vauxhall Cavalier. It also had a number of front-wheel drive rivals, including the Peugeot 305 and Renault 18. Nissan had enjoyed significant sales success in Britain since the early 1970s and the Bluebird sold reasonably well there, although it was not as popular as the smaller Cherry and Sunny.

For the export models, a 'Nissan' badge began appearing in 1981. However, in Australia, where 130,000 910s were built between 1981 and 1986, the name change from Datsun Bluebird to Nissan Bluebird did not occur until 1983.

After eight years the Bluebird returned to the Taiwanese market. Yulon had replaced the Bluebird with the Nissan Violet in 1971. The new model was considered to be in a new class and was now known as the Yue Loong Bluebird 911. Until then, Yue Loong had reserved the 900-series for the larger Laurels. After a facelift, the car became the 912.

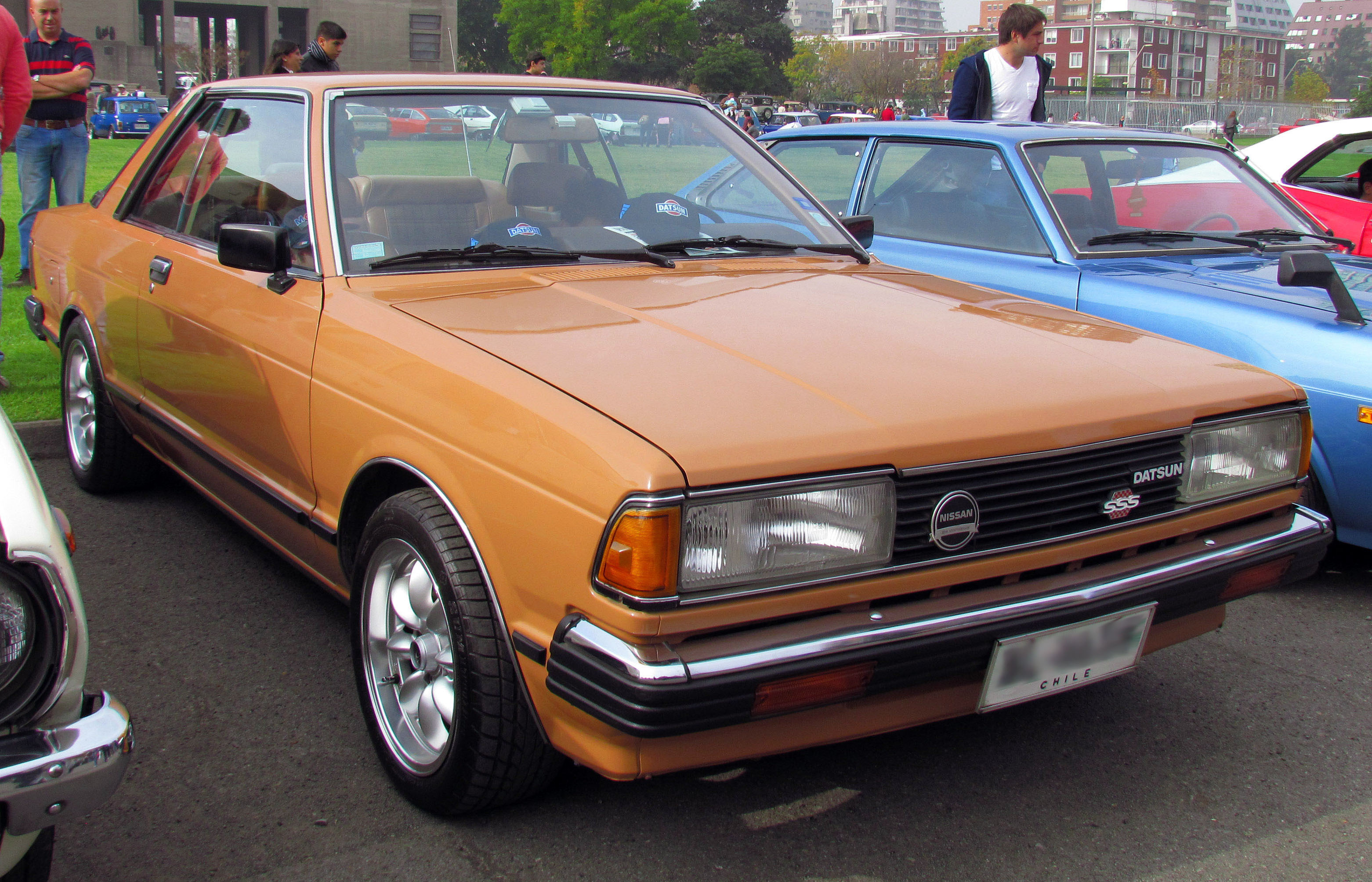
1982 Bluebird 1.8 SSS Coupé HT (Chile)

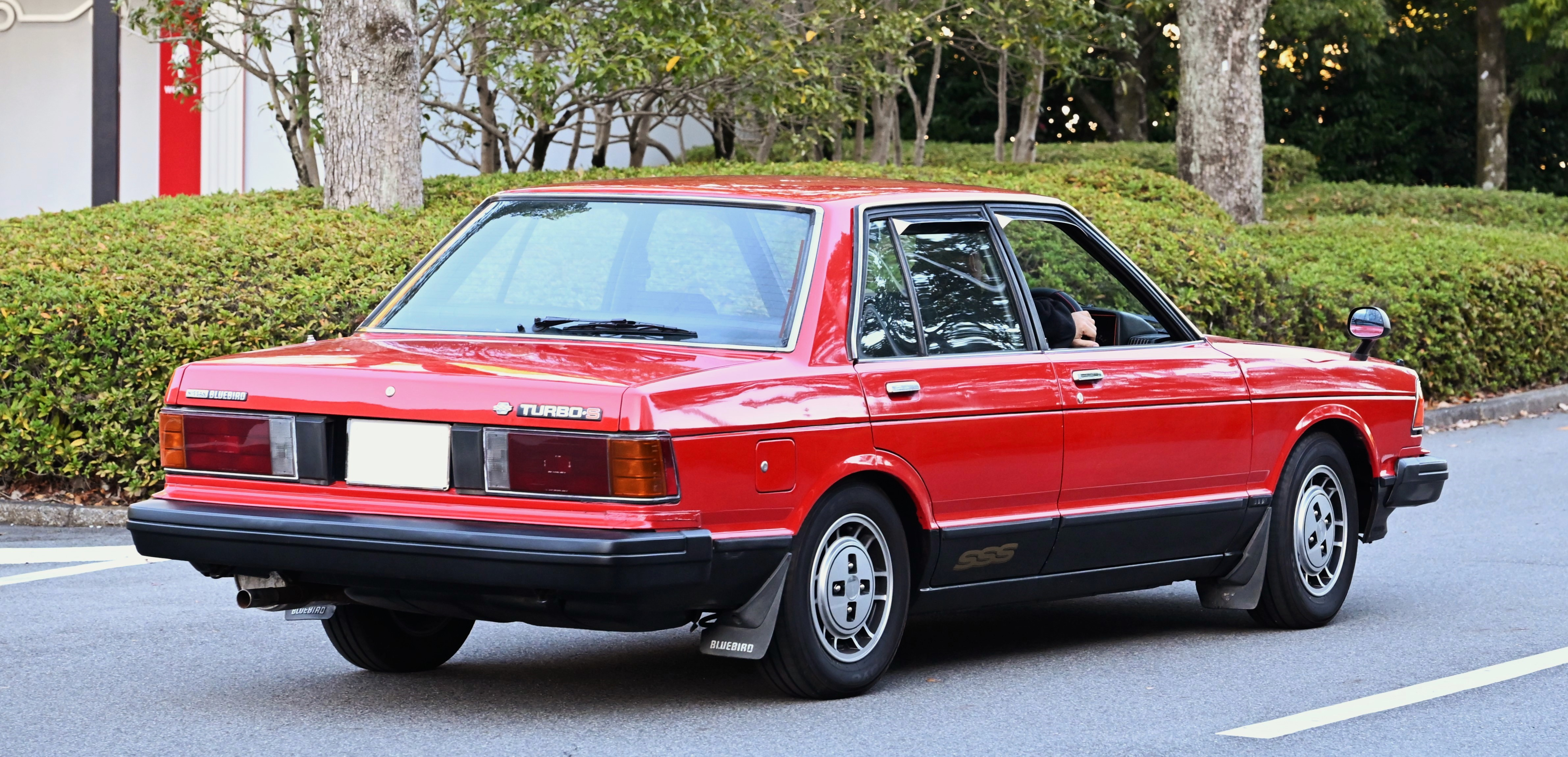
Bluebird Turbo SSS-S sedan (910)

Nissan New Zealand assembled several versions of the Bluebird 910. These were shipped in CKD from Japan, including a top ZX model that was the first, and only, car to be assembled in the country with electrically adjustable Japanese domestic style 'hockey stick' rear view mirrors on the front guards (which had to be sent out after kit unpacking for a local specialist to stamp the mounting holes). NZ cars initially had the two-tone brown interior; this was switched to grey at the mid-life facelift when the top model's power exterior mirrors were relocated to the door mounting now universal today. Japan itself eventually phased out the mandatory wing-mount mirrors that also distinguished thousands of used cars imported from Japan into NZ in the late 1980s and early 90's. In Japan, the six-cylinder Bluebird of the 610 and 810 series was replaced by the Skyline based Nissan Leopard with the Bluebird returning to four-cylinder powered vehicles. The Leopard joined the Bluebird at Nissan Bluebird Store Japanese dealerships.

The Bluebird was also made in South Africa (Pretoria) 1978 to 1980 as well and was called the Datsun 1600J Deluxe, 1800j deluxe or 1800J SSS Sedan which had the twin carburetor set up and a five speed gearbox. A station wagon version with a 1600 cc engine was also made. The cars had the L16 or L18 engines. After a while the cars model name changed to the Datsun Stanza. The cars were all rear wheel drives with solid axle and coil springs. These cars were the last models to have the name Datsun as the later models all had the name Nissan due to the global name change. This car was very popular as it reminded people of the Datsun P510 models made in 1969 to 1973 in South Africa.

The Maxima name first appeared in this generation. In the United States, these models were sold as the 810 Deluxe or Maxima. The Maxima name was solely used from 1982. The 910 name was never used in Australia.

This is the generation that spawned the S130 Fairlady Z, and in turn, the Z31 and Z32 Fairlady Z's using updated versions of the platform of this generation.

A one-off convertible was built by Nissan for use as a bullpen car by the Yokohama BayStars (now the Yokohama DeNA BayStars). It was the first of such bullpen cars that Nissan would provide for their hometown team. They would go on to supply a Be-1, an S-Cargo, and most recently, a Leaf.

== Australian production ==
Australia had the 910 from 1981 to 1984 with the L20B engine, and from 1985 to 1986 with the CA20S engine. In the United States, the 910 was offered as the Datsun 810/Maxima with either the 2.4-litre L24E inline-six or the 2.8-litre LD28 diesel inline-six. The Australian model was a downgraded, locally produced version of the Japanese model with no independent rear suspension, electronic fuel injection, or turbo versions. However, the cars were offered in a sporty version, known as the TR-X. The main difference between these Bluebirds and the base models are a sporty trim, including an optional front air dam, centre mount aerial, 15-inch alloy wheels, a small rear spoiler, map lights, seats with better bolstering and so forth. Mechanically, the cars were not much different, the only main differences to be found are rear disc brakes which were shared with the LX and a 3.9:1 diff ratio compared to the standard 3.7:1. Australian production totaled 130,000 vehicles.

For Australia, the 910 was replaced by the Nissan Pintara, a locally built vehicle based on the Skyline, but with a four-cylinder engine.

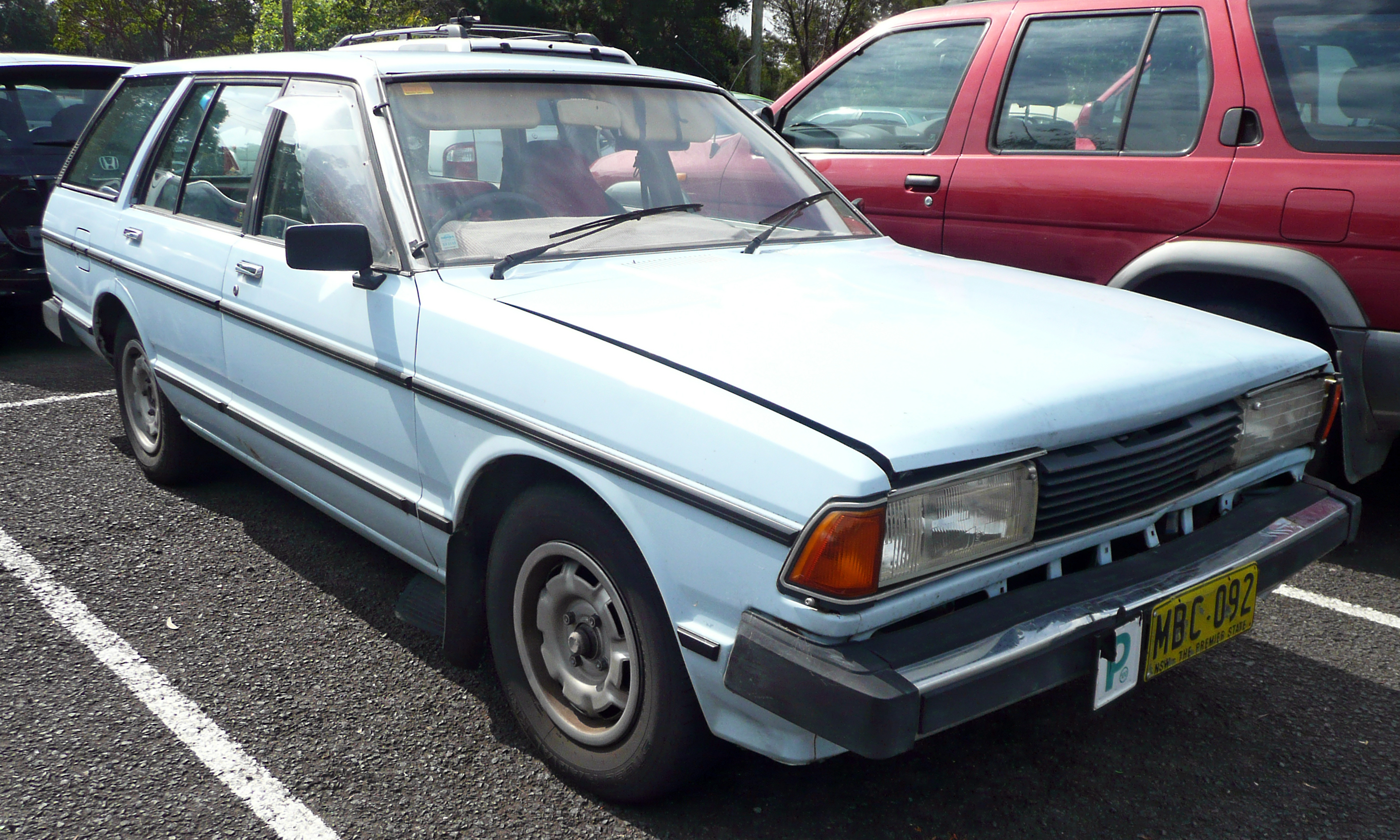
1981–1983 Datsun Bluebird (P910) wagon

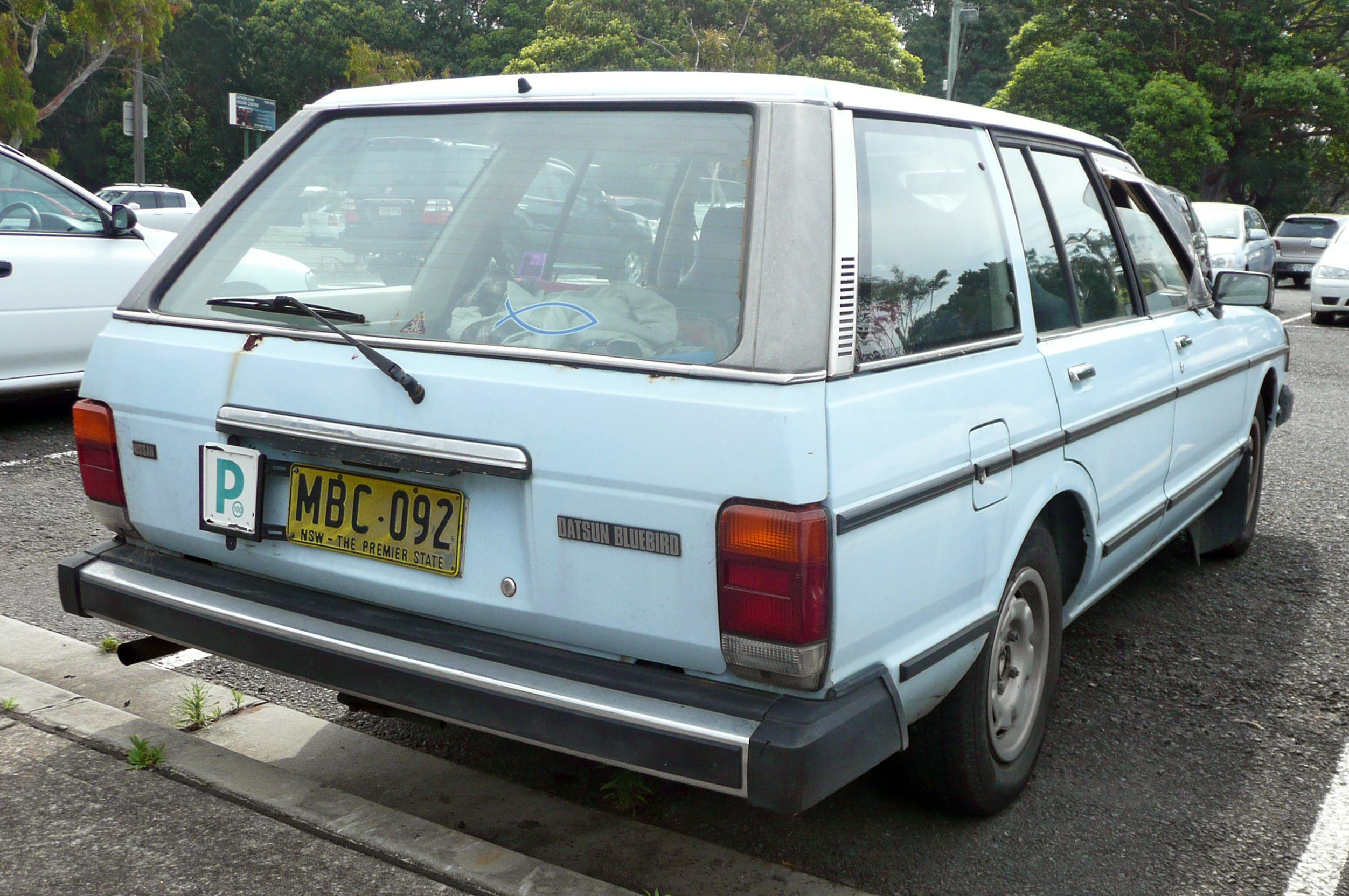
1981–1983 Datsun Bluebird (P910) wagon

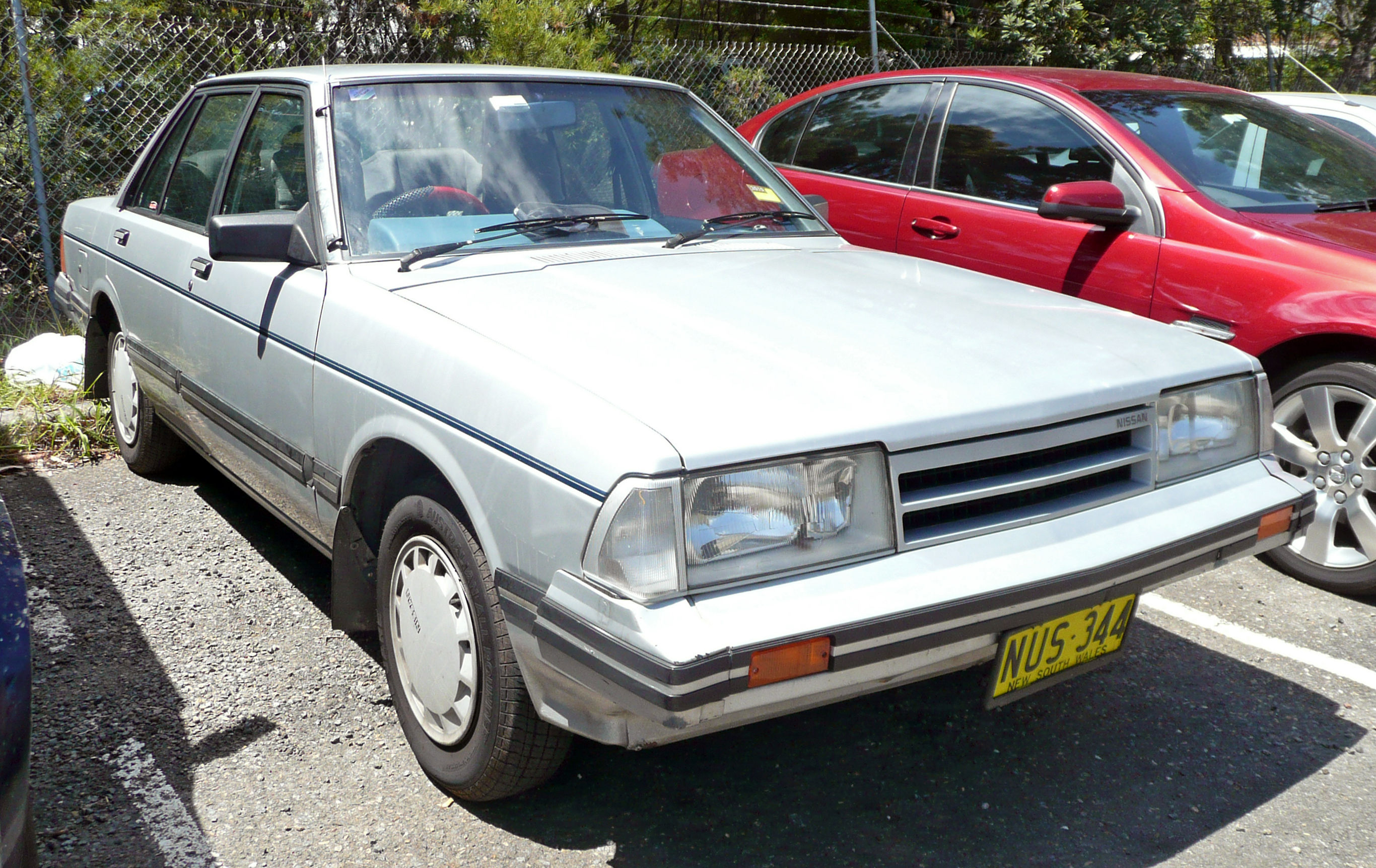
1985–1986 Nissan Bluebird (P910 Series III) GXE sedan

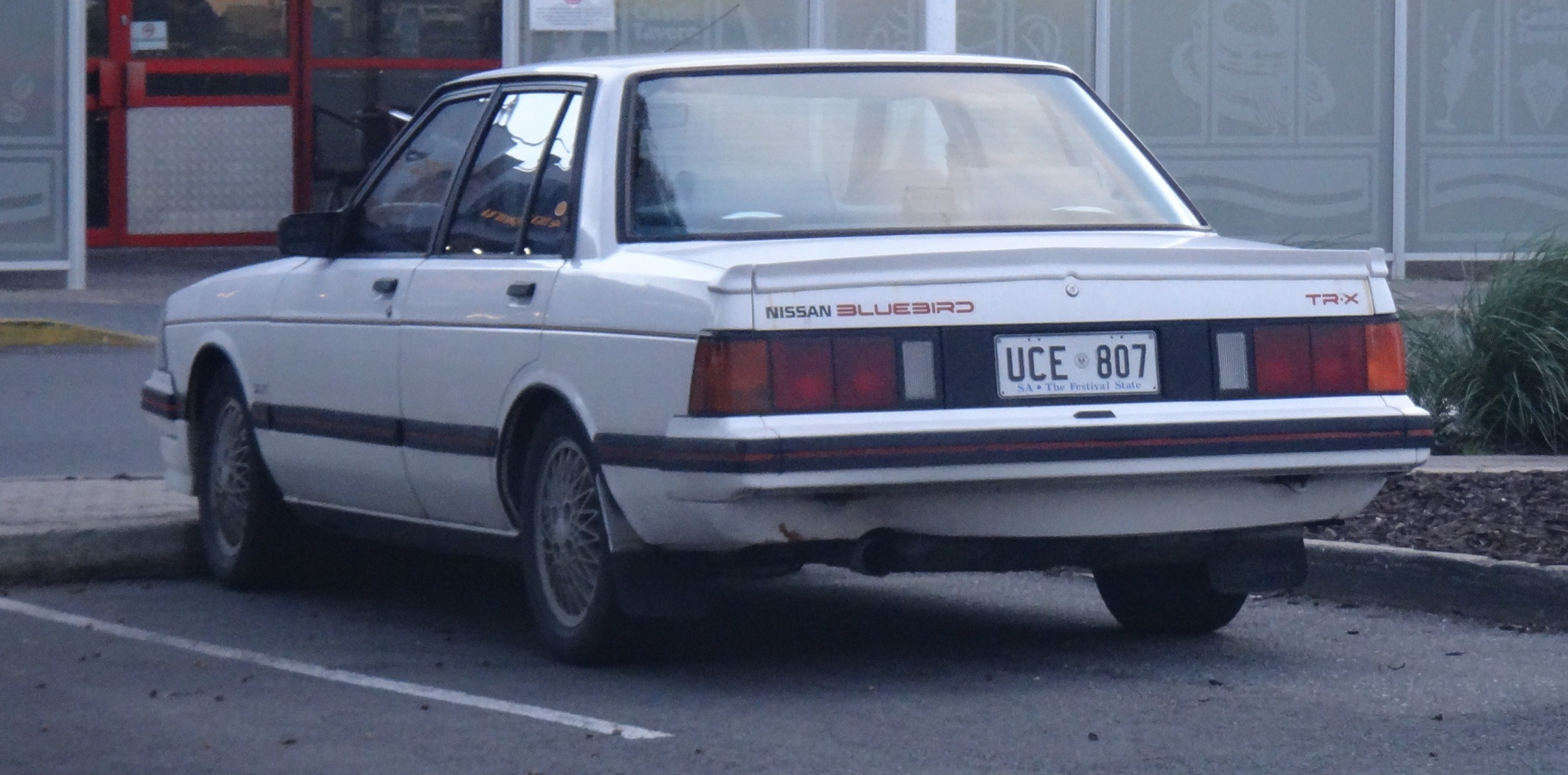
1985–1986 Nissan Bluebird (P910 Series III) TR-X sedan

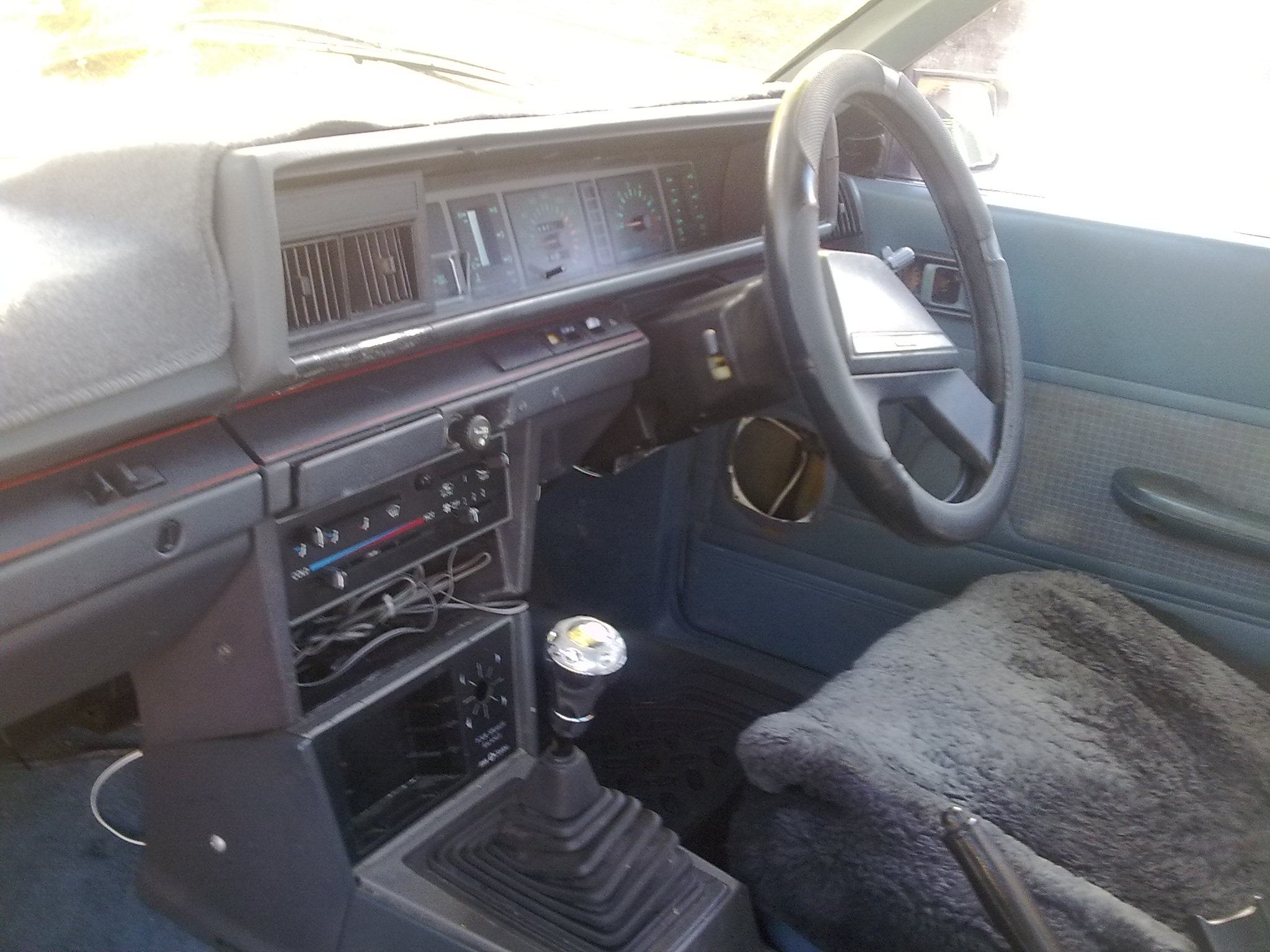
Interior

== Motorsport ==
Nissan won the 1982 Australian Endurance Championship for Makes with two factory entered 910 series Bluebird Turbos.

On 29 September 1984 George Fury put his Nissan Bluebird Turbo (an imported version with a Nissan Z engine turbo motor and fabricated IRS) on pole position for the 1984 Bathurst 1000 touring car race with a time of 2:13.850. This remains the fastest time by a closed sedan on the old 6.172 km Mount Panorama Circuit before the introduction of the Caltex Chase in 1987 increased the lap distance to 6.213 km. It was the first time a turbocharged car had won the pole at the Bathurst 1000.

Fury had driven the Bluebird to second place in the 1983 Australian Touring Car Championship, and later that year became the first driver to put a turbocharged car on the front row at Bathurst when he qualified second for the 1983 Bathurst 1000. Earlier in 1983, Fury's Nissan Australia team mate Fred Gibson had driven the Bluebird to its first race victory anywhere in the world when he won two heats and Round 3 of the 1983 AMSCAR Series at Sydney's Amaroo Park circuit.
