= 1982 Australian Touring Car Championship =

Motor racing competition

Seasons
- ← 1981 1983 →

The 1982 Australian Touring Car Championship was a CAMS sanctioned Australian motor racing title open to Group C Touring Cars. It began on 18 February 1982 at Sandown Raceway and ended on 16 May at Oran Park Raceway after eight rounds. The title, which was the 23rd Australian Touring Car Championship, was won by defending champion Dick Johnson, driving a Ford XD Falcon.

Peter Brock had actually scored more points than Johnson throughout the championship driving Marlboro Holden Dealer Team entered Holden Commodore VC and VH SS models. However, the use of not yet homologated engine heads on the cars saw him disqualified from all but two rounds of the championship. The matter between CAMS and the HDT ended in court with Brock agreeing to the loss of points and the championship to avoid a three-month suspension for himself and the team which would have actually excluded them from competing in the James Hardie 1000 at Bathurst.

Allan Moffat's win in Round 5 at Lakeside with a Mazda RX-7 was the first ever ATCC race win by a Mazda and the first ever ATCC race win by a Japanese car. It was also the first ATCC race to be won by a car not powered by a V8 engine since Peter Brock's victory in Round 4 of the 1974 championship at Amaroo Park driving a 6 cylinder, Holden LJ Torana GTR XU-1.

Under 3000cc class competitor Bob Holden finished second in the championship driving a Ford Escort Mk.II. Though he would finish no higher than 8th outright in any race, points scored for class placings saw him finish second on 36 points, 21 behind Johnson and 5 points in front of both Moffat and Kevin Bartlett (Chevrolet Camaro Z28).

== Teams and drivers ==
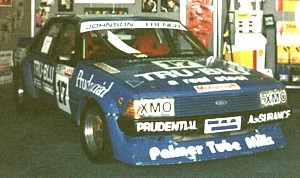
Dick Johnson won the championship driving a Ford XD Falcon

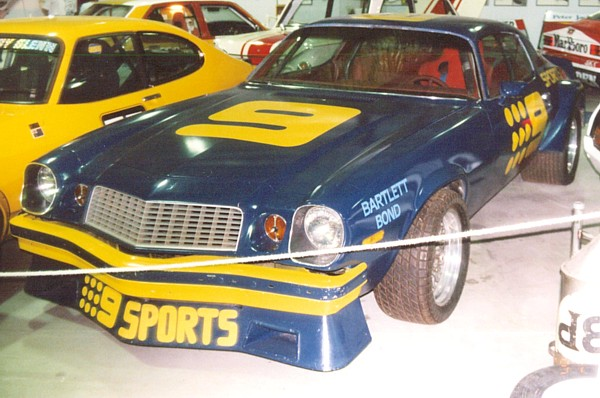
Kevin Bartlett placed equal third driving a Chevrolet Camaro Z28

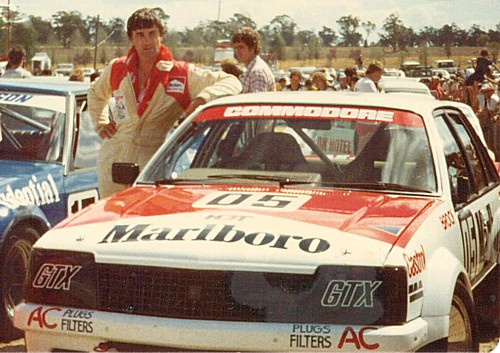
Peter Brock placed equal fifth driving a Holden VH Commodore SS and a Holden VC Commodore (pictured)

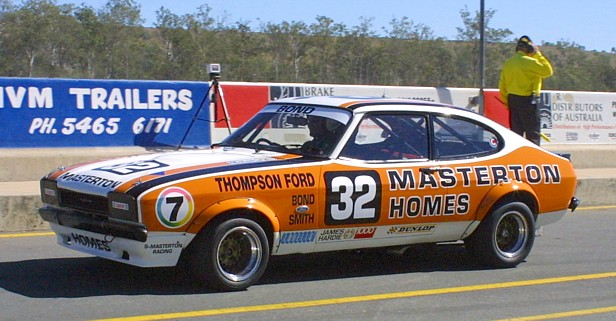
Colin Bond placed equal 17th driving a Ford Capri

The following teams and drivers competed in the championship:

Team	Car	Class	No	Driver
Masterton Homes Pty Ltd	Ford Capri Mk.II	3000cc	2	(Australia) Steve Masterton
Masterton Homes Pty Ltd	Ford Capri Mk.II	3000cc	31	(Australia) Colin Bond
Cadbury Schweppes Pty Ltd	Holden VC Commodore	6000cc	3	(New Zealand) Peter Janson
Wayne Negus	Holden VC Commodore	6000cc	3	(Australia) Wayne Negus
Re-Car Racing	Holden VC Commodore; Holden VH Commodore	6000cc	4	(Australia) Alan Browne (Australia) Allan Grice
Re-Car Racing	Holden VC Commodore; Holden VH Commodore	6000cc	6; 16	(Australia) Ron Wanless
Marlboro Holden Dealer Team	Holden VH Commodore	6000cc	05	(Australia) Peter Brock
John Sands Racing	Ford XD Falcon	6000cc	6	(Australia) Rusty French
Launceston Hotel	Holden VC Commodore	6000cc	7; 11	(United Kingdom) Clive Benson-Brown (Australia) Garry Rogers
Garry Willmington Performance	Ford XD Falcon	6000cc	8	(Australia) Garry Willmington
Nine Network Racing Team	Chevrolet Camaro Z28	6000cc	9	(Australia) Kevin Bartlett
John Duggan	Mazda RX-7	3000cc	10	(Australia) John Duggan
Gary Rowe	Isuzu Gemini ZZ/R	3000cc	11	(Australia) Gary Rowe
Cullen Automotive Industries	Holden VC Commodore	6000cc	12; 22	(Australia) Warren Cullen
Bob Holden Motors Manly Vale	Ford Escort Mk.II	3000cc	13	(Australia) Bob Holden
Bob Holden Motors Manly Vale	Ford Escort Mk.II	3000cc	14	(Australia) Brian Nightingale
John Donnelly	Ford XD Falcon	6000cc	14	(Australia) John Donnelly
John English	Ford XD Falcon	6000cc	15	(Australia) John English
Palmer Tube Mills	Ford XD Falcon	6000cc	17	(Australia) Dick Johnson
Murray Carter	Ford XD Falcon	6000cc	18	(Australia) Murray Carter
JPS Team BMW	BMW 635 CSi	6000cc	21	(New Zealand) Jim Richards
Robert Muir	Ford XD Falcon	6000cc	24	(Australia) Robert Muir
Roadways Racing	Holden VC Commodore	6000cc	27	(Australia) Steve Harrington
Bayside Spares	Holden VH Commodore	6000cc	28	(Australia) Barry Lawrence
Tony Kavich	Mazda RX-7	6000cc	30	(Australia) Tony Kavich
Alexander Rotary Engines	Mazda RX-7	6000cc	35	(Australia) Phil Alexander
Penrith Mazda Centre	Mazda RX-7	6000cc	37	(Australia) Terry Shiel
Strongbow Racing Team	Mazda RX-7	3000cc 6000cc	40	(Australia) Peter McLeod
Barry Jones	Mazda RX-7	6000cc	41	(Australia) Barry Jones
Peter Stuyvesant International	Mazda RX-7	6000cc	43	(Canada) Allan Moffat
Beninca Motors	Alfa Romeo Alfetta GTV	3000cc	46	(Australia) Joe Beninca
David Parsons	Holden VC Commodore	6000cc	50	(Australia) David Parsons
Les Grose	Ford Capri Mk.III	3000cc	54	(Australia) Les Grose
Maurice Spalding	Toyota Celica	3000cc	55	(Australia) Maurice Spalding
Nissan Motor Australia	Nissan Bluebird Turbo	3000cc	55	(Australia) George Fury
Nissan Motor Australia	Nissan Bluebird Turbo	3000cc	56	(Australia) Fred Gibson
Wally Scott	Toyota Celica	3000cc	57	(Australia) Wally Scott
Capri Components	Ford Capri Mk.III S	3000cc	58	(Australia) Lawrie Nelson
Chickadee Chicken	Toyota Celica	3000cc	61	(Australia) Graeme Bailey
Graeme Hooley	Holden VC Commodore	6000cc	71	(Australia) Graeme Hooley
Ross Burbidge	Mazda RX-3	3000cc	77	(Australia) Ross Burbidge
Gary Whittaker	Holden LH Torana SL/R 5000 L34	6000cc	78	(Australia) Gary Whittaker
Lester Smerdon	Isuzu Gemini	3000cc	83	(Australia) Lester Smerdon
Fred Geissler	Holden VC Commodore	6000cc	88	(Australia) Fred Geissler
Daily Planet	Toyota Celica	3000cc	88	(Australia) Craig Bradtke

== Race calendar ==
The championship was contested over an eight-round series. The Sandown round was contested over two parts and all other rounds were contested as single races.

Rd.	Race / circuit	Location / state	Date	Winner	Team	Report
1	Sandown; Sandown International Raceway	Melbourne, Victoria	17–18 Feb	Dick Johnson	Palmer Tube Mills	
2	Calder; Calder Park Raceway	Melbourne, Victoria	27–28 Feb	Dick Johnson	Palmer Tube Mills	
3	Symmons Plains; Symmons Plains Raceway	Launceston, Tasmania	6–7 Mar	Peter Brock	Marlboro Holden Dealer Team	
4	ARCO Cup; Oran Park Raceway	Sydney, New South Wales	20–21 Mar	Kevin Bartlett	Nine Network Racing Team	
5	Lakeside; Lakeside International Raceway	Brisbane, Queensland	3–4 Apr	Allan Moffat	Peter Stuyvesant International	
6	Walpamur Cup; Wanneroo Park	Perth, Western Australia	27–28 Apr	Allan Grice	Re-Car Racing	
7	Mazda Dealers of South Australia Race; Adelaide International Raceway	Virginia, South Australia	1–2 May	Dick Johnson	Palmer Tube Mills	
8	Surfers Paradise; Surfers Paradise International Raceway	Surfers Paradise, Queensland	15–16 May	Allan Moffat	Peter Stuyvesant International	

Note: Brock was excluded from Calder and lost all points from Oran Park to Surfers Paradise, however, kept the Symmons Plains win.

== Classes ==
Cars competed in two engine capacity classes:

- Up to and including 3000cc
- 3001 to 6000cc

Note: Mazda RX-7s fitted with bridge port engines competed in the Up to and including 3000cc class and those fitted with peripheral port engines were re-classified into the 3001 to 6000cc class.

== Points system ==
Championship points were awarded on a 9–6–4–3–2–1 basis to the first six placegetters in each class at each round. Bonus points were awarded on a 4–3–2–1 basis to the first four placegetters, irrespective of class, at each round. Results from seven of the eight rounds could be retained by each driver.

== Championship results ==
Pos.	Driver	Car	San	Cal	Sym	Ora	Lak	Wan	Ade	Sur	Pts.
1	Dick Johnson	Ford XD Falcon	1st	1st	2nd	Ret	2nd	Ret	1st	Ret	57
2	Bob Holden	Ford Escort Mk.II		10th	8th	12th	8th	10th	12th	10th	36
3	Allan Moffat	Mazda RX-7	6th		Ret	7th	1st		Ret	1st	31
3	Kevin Bartlett	Chevrolet Camaro Z28	4th	Ret	3rd	1st	Ret		3rd		31
5	Peter Brock	Holden VH Commodore SS; Holden VC Commodore	2nd	DSQ	1st	DSQ	DSQ	DSQ	DSQ	DSQ	22
5	Allan Grice	Holden VH Commodore SS						1st		2nd	22
7	Lawrie Nelson	Ford Capri Mk.III S	5th	8th	Ret	Ret			8th		19
8	Ron Wanless	Holden VC Commodore				5th	3rd	2nd	11th	Ret	17
9	Steve Harrington	Holden VC Commodore	14th	3rd	Ret			3rd	5th		16
10	Steve Masterton	Ford Capri Mk.II	3rd	6th		Ret					15
10	Craig Bradtke	Toyota Celica					Ret	9th	10th		15
12	George Fury	Datsun Bluebird Turbo	10th	2nd					Ret		14
12	David Parsons	Holden VC Commodore; Holden VH Commodore SS			5th		4th	Ret	4th	4th	14
12	Murray Carter	Ford XD Falcon	11th	7th		4th	5th	4th	6th		14
15	Peter McLeod	Mazda RX-7	12th	Ret	7th	Ret		5th	Ret		12
16	Lester Smerdon	Isuzu Gemini					9th			11th	10
17	Alan Browne	Holden VH Commodore SS	14th						2nd		9
17	Terry Shiel	Mazda RX-7	15th			2nd					9
17	Colin Bond	Ford Capri Mk.II				6th					9
17	Ross Burbidge	Mazda RX-3								7th	9
21	Brian Nightingale	Ford Escort Mk.II		11th	9th	13th					7
22	Barry Jones	Mazda RX-7				3rd					6
22	Jim Richards	BMW 635 CSi								3rd	6
22	Warren Cullen	Holden VC Commodore	9th	DSQ	4th			Ret	Ret		6
22	Clive Benson-Brown	Holden VC Commodore		5th	6th			6th	7th	6th	6
22	John Duggan	Mazda RX-7				10th					6
27	Peter Janson	Holden VC Commodore		4th		Ret					5
28	Fred Gibson	Datsun Bluebird Turbo	7th								4
28	Graeme Bailey	Toyota Celica				11th					4
28	Maurice Spalding	Toyota Celica						11th			4
31	Joe Beninca	Alfa Romeo Alfetta GTV	8th								3
31	Gary Rowe	Isuzu Gemini ZZ/R		9th							3
33	Barry Lawrence	Holden VH Commodore SS					Ret			5th	2
34	Les Grose	Ford Capri Mk.III				14th					1
34	Gary Whittaker	Holden LH Torana SL/R 5000 L34					6th			9th	1
Pos.	Driver	Car	San	Cal	Sym	Ora	Lak	Wan	Ade	Sur	Pts.

Colour	Result
Gold	Winner
Silver	Second place
Bronze	Third place
Green	Points classification
Blue	Non-points classification
Blue	Non-classified finish (NC)
Purple	Retired, not classified (Ret)
Red	Did not qualify (DNQ)
Red	Did not pre-qualify (DNPQ)
Black	Disqualified (DSQ)
White	Did not start (DNS)
White	Withdrew (WD)
White	Race cancelled (C)
Blank	Did not practice (DNP)
Blank	Did not arrive (DNA)
Blank	Excluded (EX)

Note: Round results indicate outright round placings, not class placings.
