= Allan Grice =

Australian racing driver and politician (born 1942)

Allan Grice OAM
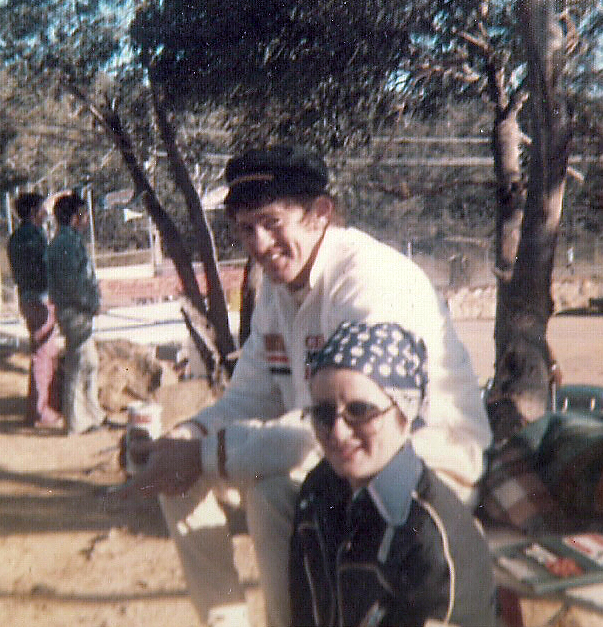
- Allan-Chris Grice at Amaroo Park Raceway
- Born: Allan Maxwell Grice; 21 October 1942 (age 84); Maitland, New South Wales
- Occupation: racing driver
- Retired: 2005

V8 Utes
- Years active: 2002–05
- Teams: Allan Grice Racing
- Best finish: 6th in 2002 V8 Brutes Series

Previous series
- 1966, 1972 1972 1974–95 1978–80 1981–85 1981–91 1984 1984, 1988 1986, 1988 1986 1987, 1989 1987 1988 1988 1988 1989–1991 2002–2005: Australian Drivers' Championship; Australian Formula 2 Championship; Australian Touring Car Championship; Australian Sports Sedan Championship; AMSCAR Series; Australian Endurance Championship; Australian GT Championship; World Sportscar Championship; European Touring Car Championship; South Pacific Touring Car Championship; Winston Cup; World Touring Car Championship; British Touring Car Championship; All-Japan Sports Prototype Championship; Asia-Pacific Touring Car Championship; Australian Superspeedway Series; V8 Ute Racing Series

Championship titles
- 1978 1979 1984 1986 1986 1990: Australian Sports Sedan Championship; Australian Sports Sedan Championship; Australian GT Championship; Bathurst 1000; South Pacific Touring Car Championship; Bathurst 1000

Member of the Queensland Legislative Assembly for Broadwater
- In office 16 September 1992 – 17 February 2001
- Preceded by: New seat
- Succeeded by: Peta-Kaye Croft

Personal details
- Party: National Party

Allan Maxwell Grice (born 21 October 1942), known to motor-racing fans as "Gricey", is an Australian former racing driver and politician, most famous for twice winning the prestigious Bathurst 1000 (1986 and 1990), and as a privateer driver of a Holden in the Australian Touring Car Championship.

Grice was educated at The Armidale School in northern NSW.

Grice also had a successful second career as a politician and Member for Broadwater in the Queensland Parliament from 1992 to 2001.

== Bathurst 1000 record ==
Grice made 26 starts between 1968 and 2002 ( sixth on the 'most starts' list).

Grice had seven podium finishes at Bathurst: two wins (1986 and 1990), four seconds (1978, 1982, 1991, 1995), and a third (1983). These results put him fifth on the 'most podiums' list for drivers at Bathurst.

Thirteen top-ten finishes (50% of all his starts) (in addition to above, fourth in 1979, seventh in 1980 and 1981, tenth in 1989, fifth in 1992 and seventh in 1994). Grice holds the record for the most Bathurst 1000 drives (sixteen) before first victory (of those who have won).

== Bathurst 1986 ==
Driving a Holden VK Commodore SS Group A that was owned by his co-driver, Graeme Bailey and built by his longtime team, Roadways Racing, Grice posted the first 100 mph average lap in a Group A car, backing up his feat of achieving the first 100 mph average lap in a Group C specification Holden VH Commodore in 1982. Grice's time for the 6.172 km circuit in 1986 was a 2:16.16 (compared to his 1982 time of 2:17.8) although he only achieved pole position in 1982.

Grice and Bailey led for all but 12 laps and Grice drove for 137 of the 163 laps (before the track alterations in response to FIA request reduced the race to 161 laps).

== Bathurst 1990 ==
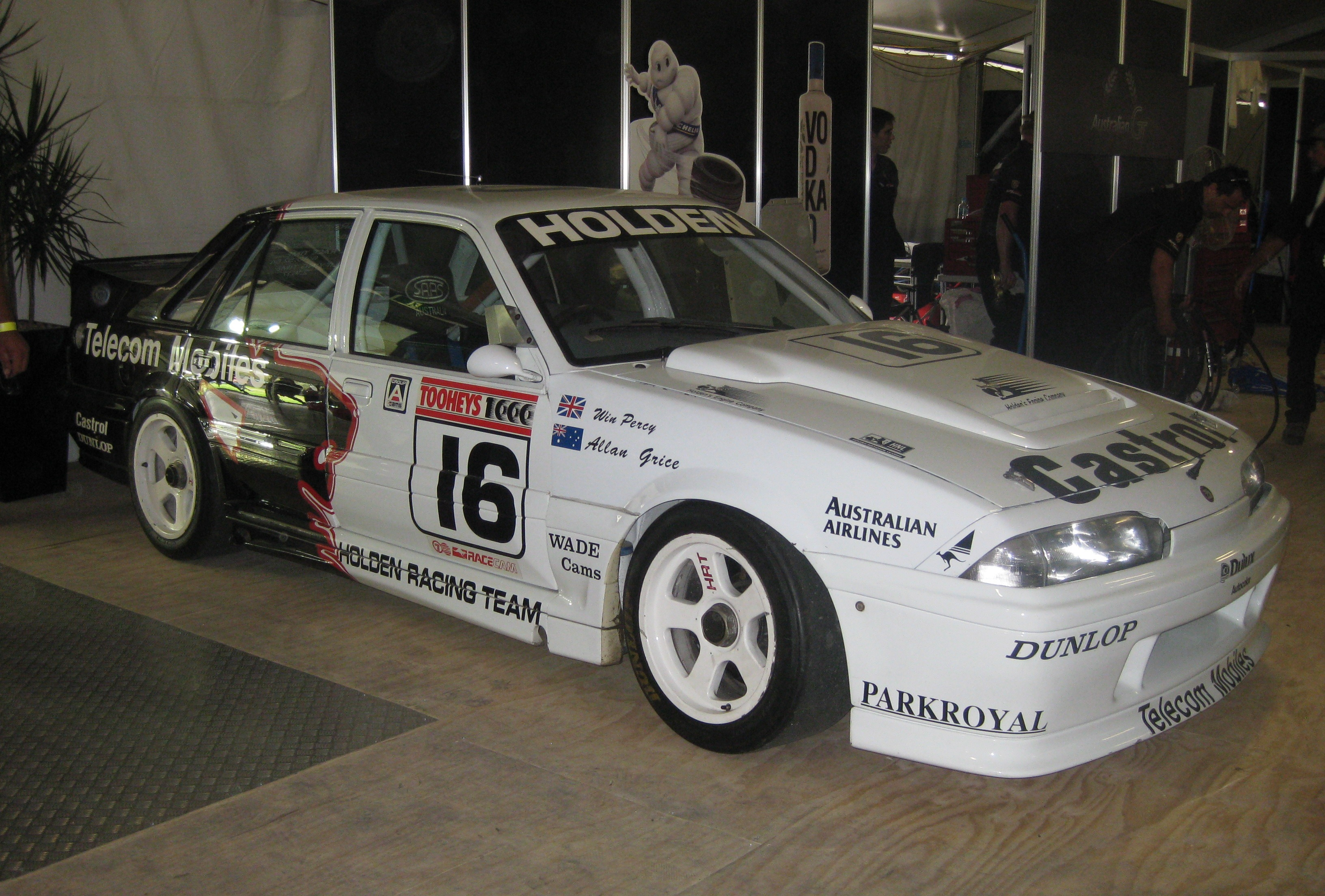
The winning Holden VL Commodore SS Group A SV from the 1990 Tooheys 1000

British Touring Car Championship legend Win Percy was given the task of reviving the fortunes of the Holden Team in the Australian Touring Car Championship by Tom Walkinshaw, and against Walkinshaw's wishes Percy chose Grice as his co-driver for Bathurst.

With Percy carrying a shoulder injury, Grice did the bulk of the testing and race driving for Bathurst. Competing against a field that included multiple turbo-charged Ford Sierras, Grice and Percy prevailed to record a famous victory in a Holden VL Commodore SS Group A SV.

== Racing career ==
Though Grice did race, and win, for Holden factory teams in ATCC (most famously in the Bathurst 1000 in 1990), he spent much of his career as a privateer racing in a Holden against the Holden works teams (typically driven by Peter Brock).

Early in his career, Grice was the first racing driver to race the iconic Holden Torana LH SLR/5000 V8 (though he raced the road-version, L31, not the race-bred, Bathurst winning version, L34).

In 1974, Grice began driving for the Craven Mild Racing team and the following year he won a number of rounds in the Australian Touring Car Championship in his SL/R 5000 Torana.

In 1975, Grice put up his strongest challenge for the Australian Touring Car Championship. Grice would have won the championship had he not been disqualified from rounds five, seven and eight. In round five, at Surfers Paradise, Grice won the race but was disqualified following a protest lodged by Holden Dealer Team manager Harry Firth. Firth correctly contended that the thermostat from the Holden V8 engine in Grice's Craven Mild Torana L34 was in fact in the car's glovebox and not where it should have been. This led to speculation that Firth had managed to convince one of Grice's mechanics to put the item in the glovebox in a bid to sabotage his season, which at that point saw Grice leading the points table. Firth's lead driver Colin Bond went on to win the 1975 ATCC. Grice continued the season after appealing the disqualification, but once the appeal was upheld he lost all points from the remaining rounds.

In 1978 Grice broke through with a placing in the Bathurst 1000 when he came second behind Peter Brock in a Craven Mild Racing Holden LX Torana A9X SS5000.

Grice was the winner of the 1978 and 1979 Australian Sports Sedan Championships driving Frank Gardner's Chevrolet Corvair. Grice also finished fourth with open wheel star Alfredo Costanzo in the 1979 Hardie-Ferodo 1000, though he was some nine laps behind the winning HDT Torana of Peter Brock and Jim Richards, with the Craven Mild Torana hatchback, like the rest of the field, not posing a serious threat to Brock.

In 1980, the Craven Mild team began driving a BMW 318i Turbo in the sports sedan series, first in his usual Craven Mild colours, but later in the black and gold of the JPS Team BMW. Grice had little success with the car, constantly battling its handling which was not up to the power of the turbocharged engines. Grice's relationship with team manager Gardner had also deteriorated by this time, resulting in his sacking from the JPS team at the end of 1981. This led to a long-standing animosity between Grice and Gardner which lasted until Gardner's death at the age of 78 in 2009. The crux of the animosity was Gardner allegedly not having a high opinion of Grice's aggressive driving style, while Grice also contends that Gardner stole his longtime Craven A and JPS cigarette sponsorship.

After contemplating giving away racing, with no prospects of a competitive drive, Grice was thrown a lifeline by Re-Car owner Alan Browne. Grice was listed to drive with Browne at Bathurst in 1982 and Grice qualified fastest in the team's Holden VH Commodore. He and Browne finished second after a duel with the similar Commodore of Peter Brock in the early laps. The following year, Grice finished third at Bathurst in an STP sponsored Roadways Commodore shared with Bond.

Grice holds the distinction of winning the last ATCC race held under CAMS locally developed Group C rules when he won the final race of the 1984 ATCC at the Adelaide International Raceway in a Holden VH Commodore. In a closely fought race, Grice finished less than one second in front of Brock's HDT Commodore, with series champion Dick Johnson third in his Ford Falcon, less than a second behind Brock. Grice also won the last competitive Group C race held in Australia when he drove his Roadways Holden VK Commodore to victory in a race held at the Baskerville Raceway in Tasmania in late 1984.

Grice easily won the 1984 Australian GT Championship driving the ex-Bob Jane DeKon Chevrolet Monza that had been acquired by Re-Car boss Alan Browne. Grice and the Monza sat on pole for every round of the series and won all but one race, his only loss was when the Monza lost fuel pressure while holding an eight-second lead over the Porsche Carrera RSR of Peter Fitzgerald on the last lap of round three at Calder Park Raceway. In late 1984, Grice was joined by fellow touring car star Johnson and driver-engineer Ron Harrop in the Monza, when they contested the Sandown 1000 as part of the 1984 World Endurance Championship. The race was the first ever world championship road race held in Australia. Running in the special "AC Class" (for cars in the Australian GT and sports car championships), Grice qualified the car 18th and second in class, 1.9 seconds shy of the 1984 Australian Sports Car Championship winning Romano WE84-Cosworth driven by Alfredo Costanzo (and almost nine seconds slower than Stefan Bellof's pole time in his Rothmans Porsche 956). The Monza ran strongly, with Grice reporting that the 600 bhp (447 kW; 608 PS) 6.0 L Chevrolet was able to stay with the faster Porsches on the straights, but lost out to the ground effect sports cars through the turns (Johnson claimed that the car had a lot more grunt than its handling deserved, though Grice contended that the Monza handled very well). The Monza was eventually disqualified from the race for receiving outside assistance.

During 1984, Grice also competed in the 24 Hours of Le Mans. Driving a Charles Ivey Racing prepared Porsche 956, with co-drivers Alain de Cadenet and Chris Craft, the car was qualified 32nd, but was a DNF with engine failure after 274 laps. Grice, who proved the fastest of the trio despite never having raced at Le Mans or in a 956, was openly critical of the team and their preparation of the car which had a bad habit of losing wheels at high speed. After the Porsche lost a wheel early in the race (before his first driving stint), Grice was heard to say loud enough for everyone in the team to hear that he had race cars at home that did not shed wheels.

Though best remembered for his endurance race feats, Grice was a very fast driver. Driving as a privateer, he was the first driver to record a 100 mph laps around Bathurst in both a Group C car 1982 and in a Group A car 1986 (that time on his way to winning Bathurst).

In 1987, Grice became the first Australian driver to qualify for NASCAR's Coca-Cola 600 at the Charlotte Motor Speedway. He finished 35th due to rear end issues. He returned to the race as an owner-driver in 1989, finishing 34th due to engine issues. Grice was also prominent in the early NASCAR races held in Australia, held in 1988 at the then new, A$54 million Calder Park Thunderdome owned by former racer and prominent businessman Bob Jane. Grice qualified his Foster's sponsored Oldsmobile Delta 88 third for the 1988 Goodyear NASCAR 500 at the Thunderdome, the first ever NASCAR race held outside of North America. His race ended on lap 80 when he was caught up in a crash that he could not avoid due to the Oldsmobile having lost its brakes. Grice suffered a broken collar bone in the high speed crash. The race itself was dominated by visiting Winston Cup drivers Neil Bonnett, Bobby Allison and Dave Marcis, with Bonnett eventually winning over fellow Alabama Gang member Allison by just 0.86 seconds. Grice would compete at the track again in December in the 1988 NASCAR Christmas 500, finishing in eighth. In the final running of the Australia Exhibition, the 1990 NASCAR Christmas 400, Grice finished in twelfth.

In 1990, Grice and his old Roadways touring car team led by team boss and chief mechanic Les Small, developed a left-hand-drive Holden VN Commodore powered by a 358 cubic inch Chevrolet V8 engine to run in the Australian NASCAR series, with Grice taking several wins at both the Thunderdome and the 1/2 mile Speedway Super Bowl at the Adelaide International Raceway. Grice, Small and Bob Jane also formed a plan to take the Commodore to America to run in the Winston Cup], though ultimately the plans were shelved.

In 1988, thanks to his friendship with his 1987 James Hardie 1000 co-driver Percy, Grice was drafted into the Nissan Motorsport Europe team for the European Touring Car Championship, driving a Nissan Skyline HR31 GTS-R. Percy, Grice, and Swedish driver Anders Olofsson, drove the car to sixth outright in the 1988 Spa 24 Hours. The Nissan Europe team was managed by former Ford Works Team and later Nissan Australia team boss from the Australian Group C days, Howard Marsden. Grice also won the inaugural Bathurst 12 Hour held in 1991 driving a Toyota Supra Turbo with Peter Fitzgerald and Nigel Arkell.

Grice last competed in a full ATCC was in 1987. He was signed by Pinnacle Motorsport to complete the full 1995 season, although the relationship was severed mid-year. Grice's final ATCC race was at the 1995 Oran Park round driving a Ford EF Falcon for Glenn Seton Racing. Grice ended his career having won ten rounds in the Australian Touring Car Championship (equal 12th on list of round winners).

Grice continued to compete as an endurance co-driver, his last appearance was at the 2002 Bathurst 1000 driving a Ford AU Falcon entered by V8 Ute series team Nilsson Motorsport. The Bathurst start, some five years after his previous start, rekindled Grice as a racing driver and he made a comeback to racing in the V8 Utes series driving Falcon XR8s and forming his own team. He was competitive, winning races with a championship position high of sixth.

Since stepping away from the drivers seat Grice remains a familiar sight at historic racing events as well as supporting the racing career of his son, Benjamin Grice.

== Career results ==
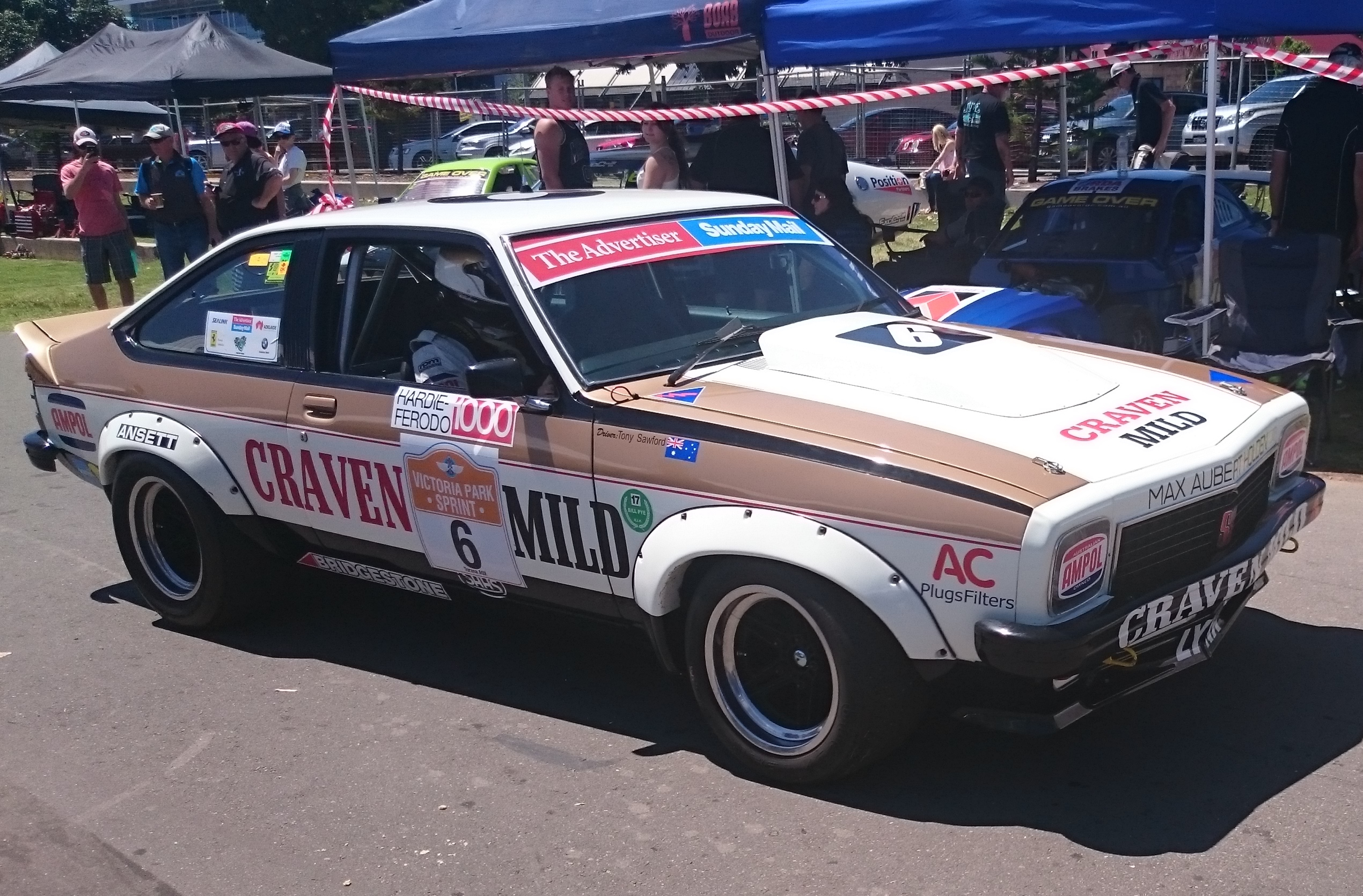
Grice drove a Holden LX Torana SS A9X for Craven Mild Racing from 1977 to 1980. (Car pictured in 2015)

Season	Series	Position	Car	Team
1972	Australian Formula 2 Championship	6th	Mildren Waggott & Mildren England	Max Stewart Motors & Alan Grice
1975	Australian Touring Car Championship	3rd	Holden LH Torana SL/R 5000 L34	Craven Mild Racing
1976	Australian Touring Car Championship	4th	Holden LH Torana SL/R 5000 L34	Craven Mild Racing
1976	Goodrich Radial Challenge	19th	Mazda RX-3	Mazda House Racing
1976	Rothmans Sun-7 Series	1st	Mazda RX-3	Mazda House
1977	Australian Touring Car Championship	7th	Holden LH Torana SL/R 5000 L34	Craven Mild Racing
1978	Australian Touring Car Championship	7th	Holden LX Torana SS A9X	Craven Mild Racing
1978	Australian Sports Sedan Championship	1st	Chevrolet Corvair	Craven Mild Racing
1979	Australian Touring Car Championship	7th	Holden LX Torana SS A9X	Craven Mild Racing
1979	Australian Sports Sedan Championship	1st	Chevrolet Corvair	Craven Mild Racing
1980	Australian Touring Car Championship	8th	Holden LX Torana SS A9X	Craven Mild Racing
1980	Australian Sports Sedan Championship	2nd	Holden LX Torana; BMW 318i turbo	Craven Mild Racing
1981	Australian Touring Car Championship	12th	BMW 635 CSi	JPS Team BMW
1981	Australian Sports Sedan Championship	5th	BMW 318i turbo	JPS Team BMW
1981	Better Brakes 3.5 Litre Series	2nd	BMW 635 CSi	JPS Team BMW
1982	Australian Touring Car Championship	5th	Holden VH Commodore SS	Re-Car Racing
1982	Better Brakes AMSCAR Series	1st	Holden VH Commodore SS	Re-Car Racing
1982	Australian Endurance Championship	12th	Holden VH Commodore SS	Re-Car Racing
1983	Australian Touring Car Championship	4th	Holden VH Commodore SS	STP Roadways Racing
1983	Better Brakes AMSCAR Series	8th	Holden VC Commodore; Holden VH Commodore SS	Ken Mathews; STP Roadways Racing
1983	Australian Endurance Championship	5th	Holden VH Commodore SS	STP Roadways Racing
1984	Australian Touring Car Championship	5th	Holden VH Commodore SS	SAAS Roadways Racing
1984	Australian GT Championship	1st	Chevrolet Monza	Re-Car Racing
1984	World Endurance Championship	NC	Porsche 956B; Chevrolet Monza	Charles Ivey Racing; Re-Car Racing
1984	Alfasud Trophy	2nd	Alfa Romeo Alfasud	
1984	Australian Endurance Championship	NC	Holden VK Commodore	Roadways Racing
1985	Nissan ET Super Challenge	3rd	Nissan Pulsar ET Turbo	Nissan Motorsport Australia
1985	Australian Endurance Championship	NC	Alfa Romeo GTV6; Holden VK Commodore	The Toy Shop; Super K-Mart / Roadways Racing
1986	FIA Touring Car Championship	NC	Holden VK Commodore SS Group A	Australian National Motor Racing Team
1986	Australian Endurance Championship	11th	Holden VK Commodore SS Group A	Chickadee Chicken; Roadways Racing
1986	South Pacific Touring Car Championship	1st	Holden VK Commodore SS Group A Nissan Skyline DR30 RS	Roadways Racing; Team Nissan Racing NZ
1987	Australian Touring Car Championship	8th	Holden VK Commodore SS Group A Holden VL Commodore SS Group A	Roadways Racing
1987	World Touring Car Championship	NC	BMW M3; Holden VL Commodore SS Group A	Schnitzer Motorsport; Roadways Racing
1987	Winston Cup	NC	Oldsmobile Cutlass	Foster's
1988	European Touring Car Championship	NC	Nissan Skyline HR31 GTS-R	Nissan Europe
1988	British Touring Car Championship	46th	Nissan Skyline HR31 GTS-R	Nissan Europe
1988	World Sportscar Championship	NC	Nissan (March) R88C	Nissan Motorsports
1989	Australian Touring Car Championship	14th	Holden VL Commodore SS Group A SV	ICL Racing
1989	Winston Cup	NC	Pontiac Grand Prix	
1989/90	Australian NASCAR Championship	10th	Holden VN Commodore	ICL Racing
1990	Australian Endurance Championship	8th	Holden VL Commodore SS Group A SV	Holden Racing Team
1991	Australian Touring Car Championship	15th	Holden VN Commodore SS Group A SV	Holden Racing Team
1995	Australian Touring Car Championship	13th	Holden VR Commodore; Ford EF Falcon	Pinnacle Motorsport; Peter Jackson Racing
2002	Australian V8 BrUte Series	6th	Ford Falcon AUII XR8 Ute	Kerry Wilson
2003	Australian V8 BrUte Series	10th	Ford Falcon BA XR8 Ute	Akubra/Wrangler
2005	Australian V8 BrUte Series	18th	Ford Falcon BA XR8 Ute	Allan Grice Racing

=== Complete Australian Touring Car Championship results ===
(key) (Races in bold indicate pole position) (Races in italics indicate fastest lap)

Year	Team	Car	1	2	3	4	5	6	7	8	9	10	11	12	13	14	15	16	17	18	19	20	21	22	23	24	25	26	27	28	29	DC	Points
1973	Allan Grice	Holden LJ Torana GTR XU1	SYM	CAL	SAN	WAN	SUR	AIR	ORA; Ret	WAR; Ret																						NC	0
1974	Craven Mild Racing	Holden LH Torana SL/R 5000	SYM	CAL	SAN	AMA	ORA; 14	SUR; Ret	AIR																							NC	0
1975	Craven Mild Racing	Holden LH Torana SL/R 5000 L34	SYM; 4	CAL; 1	AMA; 2	ORA; 1	SUR; DSQ	AIR; DSQ	LAK; DSQ																							3rd	39
1976	Craven Mild Racing	Holden LH Torana SL/R 5000 L34 Mazda RX-3	SYM; 13	**CAL**; **3**	ORA; 1	**ORA**; **2**	SAN; 5	AMA; DSQ	AMA; DSQ	AIR; 2	AIR; 2	LAK; Ret	LAK; Ret	SAN; Ret	AIR; 1	SUR	PHI; 5															4th	54
1977	Craven Mild Racing	Holden LH Torana SL/R 5000 L34 Holden LX Torana SS A9X Hatchback	SYM; 15	SYM; 15	CAL; Ret	ORA; 5	AMA; 3	SAN; 15	AIR; 4	LAK	**SAN**; **2**	AIR	SUR	PHI; 1																		7th	39
1978	Craven Mild Racing	Holden LX Torana SS A9X Hatchback	SYM; 5	ORA; 10	AMA; 1	SAN; 3	WAN; 3	WAN; Ret	CAL; 13	LAK	AIR; 6																					7th	22
1979	Craven Mild Racing	Holden LX Torana SS A9X Hatchback	SYM; 3	CAL; Ret	ORA; 2	SAN	WAN; 3	SUR; DNS	LAK	AIR																						7th	21
1980	Craven Mild Racing	Holden LX Torana SS A9X Hatchback	SYM; 3	CAL; Ret	CAL; DNS	LAK	SAN	SAN	WAN; 1	WAN; 1	SUR	AIR	ORA; Ret																			8th	19
1981	JPS Team BMW	BMW 635 CSi	SYM	CAL	CAL	ORA	SAN; 2	SAN; 2	WAN	AIR	AIR	SUR; Ret	LAK																			12th	9
1982	Re-Car Racing	Holden VC Commodore Holden VH Commodore SS	SAN	SAN	CAL	SYM	ORA	LAK	WAN; 1	AIR	SUR; 2																					5th	22
1983	STP Roadways Racing	Holden VH Commodore SS	**CAL**; Ret	SAN; 1	**SYM**; 1	WAN; Ret	AIR; 3	SUR; Ret	ORA; 3	LAK																						4th	90
1984	SAAS Roadways Racing	Holden VH Commodore SS	SAN; Ret	SYM; 3	WAN	SUR	ORA; 7	LAK	AIR; 1																							7th	56
1987	Roadways Racing	Holden VK Commodore SS Group A Holden VL Commodore SS Group A	CAL; 4	SYM; Ret	LAK; 6	WAN; 6	AIR; 3	SUR	SAN; 4	AMA; 9	ORA; Ret																					8th	62
1989	ICL Racing	Holden VL Commodore SS Group A SV	AMA	SYM	LAK	WAN	MAL	SAN	WIN; 4	ORA																						14th	10
1991	Holden Racing Team	Holden VN Commodore SS Group A SV	SAN	SYM	WAN	LAK	WIN	AMA	MAL	LAK; 8	ORA																					15th	3
1995	Pinnacle Motorsport Peter Jackson Racing	Holden VP Commodore Holden VR Commodore Ford EF Falcon	SAN; Ret	SAN; 10	SYM	SYM	BAT	BAT	PHI	PHI	LAK; 9	LAK; Ret	WIN	WIN	ECR; DNS	ECR; DNS	MAL	MAL	BAR	BAR	ORA; 17	ORA; 7										13th	17
2002	Nilsson Motorsport	Ford AU Falcon	ADE; R1	ADE; R2	PHI; R3	PHI; R4	EAS; R5	EAS; R6	EAS; R7	HDV; R8	HDV; R9	HDV; R10	CAN; R11	CAN; R12	CAN; R13	BAR; R14	BAR; R15	BAR; R16	ORA; R17	ORA; R18	WIN; R19	WIN; R20	QLD; R21	BAT; R22; Ret	SUR; R23	SUR; R24	PUK; R25	PUK; R26	PUK; R27	SAN; R28	SAN; R29	NC	0

=== Complete World Sportscar Championship results ===
(key) (Races in bold indicate pole position) (Races in italics indicate fastest lap)

Year	Team	Car	1	2	3	4	5	6	7	8	9	10	11	DC	Points
1984	(United Kingdom) Charles Ivey Racing	Porsche 956B	MNZ	SIL	LMS; Ret	NUR	BRA	MOS	SPA	IMO	FJI	KYL		NC	0
1984	(Australia) Re-Car Racing	Chevrolet Monza											SAN; DSQ	NC	0
1988	(Japan) Nissan Motorsports	Nissan R88C	JRZ	JAR	MNZ	SIL	LMS; 14	BRN	BRA	NUR	SPA	FJI; 9	SAN	NC	0

=== Complete European Touring Car Championship results ===
(key) (Races in bold indicate pole position) (Races in italics indicate fastest lap)

Year	Team	Car	1	2	3	4	5	6	7	8	9	10	11	12	13	14	DC	Points
1986	(Australia) Australian National Motor Racing Team	Holden VK Commodore SS Group A	MNZ; Ret	DON; Ret	HOC; Ret	MIS	AND	BNO	OST	NUR; 15	SPA; 23	SIL; 24	NOG	ZOL; Ret	JAR; Ret	EST; 8	NA	6
1988	(United Kingdom) Nissan Europe	Nissan Skyline HR31 GTS-R	MNZ	DON; Ret	EST	JAR	DIJ; Ret	VAL	NUR; 19	SPA; 6	ZOL; Ret	SIL; Ret	NOG; 11				40th	45

=== Complete World Touring Car Championship results ===
(key) (Races in bold indicate pole position) (Races in italics indicate fastest lap)

Year	Team	Car	1	2	3	4	5	6	7	8	9	10	11	DC	Points
1987	(West Germany) Team Schnitzer	BMW M3	MNZ	JAR	DIJ	NUR	SPA; Ret	BNO	SIL					NC	0
1987	(Australia) Roadways Racing	Holden VL Commodore SS Group A								BAT; Ret	CLD; Ret	WEL; Ret	FJI	NC	0

=== Complete South Pacific Touring Car Championship results ===
(key) (Races in bold indicate pole position) (Races in italics indicate fastest lap)

Year	Team	Car	1	2	3	4	5	DC	Points
1986	(Australia) Roadways Racing	Holden VK Commodore SS Group A	CAL	ADE; 1				1st	81
1986	(New Zealand) Team Nissan Racing NZ	Nissan Skyline DR30 RS			MAN; 12	BAY; 1	PUK; 11	1st	81

=== Complete Asia-Pacific Touring Car Championship results ===
(key) (Races in bold indicate pole position) (Races in italics indicate fastest lap)

Year	Team	Car	1	2	3	4	DC	Points
1988	(Australia) ICL Racing	Holden VL Commodore SS Group A SV	BAT; 15	WEL	PUK	FJI	NC	0

=== Complete British Touring Car Championship results ===
(key) (Races in bold indicate pole position – 1973–1990 in class) (Races in italics indicate fastest lap)

Year	Team	Car	Class	1	2	3	4	5	6	7	8	9	10	11	12	13	DC	Pts	Class
1988	Nissan Motorsport Europe	Nissan HR31 Skyline GTS-R	A	SIL	OUL	THR	DON ovr:4‡ cls:4‡	THR	SIL	SIL	BRH	SNE	BRH	BIR	DON	SIL	43rd	4	17th

‡ Endurance driver.

=== NASCAR ===
(key) (Bold – Pole position awarded by qualifying time. Italics – Pole position earned by points standings or practice time. * – Most laps led.)

==== Winston Cup Series ====
NASCAR Winston Cup Series results
Year	Team	No.	Make	1	2	3	4	5	6	7	8	9	10	11	12	13	14	15	16	17	18	19	20	21	22	23	24	25	26	27	28	29	NWCC	Pts
1987	John Sheppard	03	Olds	DAY	CAR	RCH	ATL	DAR	NWS	BRI	MAR	TAL	CLT; 35	DOV	POC	RSD	MCH	DAY	POC	TAL	GLN	MCH	BRI	DAR	RCH	DOV	MAR	NWS	CLT	CAR	RSD	ATL	107th	-
1989	Allan Grice Racing	47	Pontiac	DAY	CAR	ATL	RCH	DAR	BRI	NWS	MAR	TAL	CLT; 34	DOV	SON	POC	MCH	DAY	POC	TAL	GLN	MCH	BRI	DAR	RCH	DOV	MAR	CLT	NWS	CAR	PHO	ATL	93rd	61

=== Complete Bathurst 500/1000 results ===
Year	Car#	Team	Co-drivers	Car	Class	Laps	Pos.	Class pos.
1968	26	(Australia) Scuderia Veloce	(Australia) Bill Tuckey	Fiat 124 Sport	D	119	18th	9th
1972	35	(Australia) Cessnock Motor Works Pty Ltd		Holden LJ Torana GTR XU-1	C	-	DNS	DNS
1973	19		(Australia) Keith Murray	Holden LJ Torana GTR XU-1	D	42	DNF	DNF
1974	21	(Australia) WD & HO Wills (Aust) Ltd	(Australia) Graham Moore	Holden LH Torana SL/R 5000	3001 – 6000cc	19	DNF	DNF
1975	12	(Australia) Craven Mild Racing	(Australia) Jim Hunter	Holden LH Torana SL/R 5000 L34	D	41	DNF	DNF
1976	20	(Australia) Craven Mild Racing	(Australia) Frank Gardner	Holden LH Torana SL/R 5000 L34	3001 – 6000cc	72	DNF	DNF
1977	6	(Australia) Craven Mild Racing	(Australia) Frank Gardner	Holden LX Torana SS A9X Hatchback	3001 – 6000cc	140	DNF	DNF
1978	6	(Australia) Craven Mild Racing	(Australia) John Leffler	Holden LX Torana SS A9X Hatchback	A	162	2nd	2nd
1979	6	(Australia) Craven Mild Racing	(Australia) Alfredo Costanzo	Holden LX Torana SS A9X Hatchback	A	154	4th	4th
1980	6	(Australia) Craven Mild Racing	(Australia) John Smith	Holden VC Commodore	3001–6000cc	156	7th	7th
1981	44	(Australia) JPS Team BMW	(United Kingdom) David Hobbs	BMW 635 CSi	6 Cylinder & Rotary	113	7th	2nd
1982	4	(Australia) Re-Car Racing	(Australia) Alan Browne	Holden VH Commodore SS	A	162	2nd	2nd
1983	6	(Australia) STP Roadways Racing	(Australia) Colin Bond	Holden VH Commodore SS	A	160	3rd	3rd
1984	6	(Australia) Roadways Racing	(Australia) Steve Harrington	Holden VK Commodore SS	Group C	70	DNF	DNF
1984	36	(Australia) Roadways Racing	(Australia) Steve Harrington	Holden VH Commodore SS	Group C	7	DNF	DNF
1985	6	(Australia) Super K-Mart (Australia) Roadways Racing Services	(Australia) Warren Cullen	Holden VK Commodore SS	C	114	DNF	DNF
1986	2	(Australia) Roadways Racing	(Australia) Graeme Bailey	Holden VK Commodore SS Group A	C	163	1st	1st
1987	2	(Australia) Roadways Racing	(United Kingdom) Win Percy	Holden VL Commodore SS Group A	1	96	DNF	DNF
1988	2	(Australia) ICL Racing	(United Kingdom) Win Percy	Holden VL Commodore SS Group A SV	A	139	15th	11th
1989	15	(Australia) ICL Racing	(New Zealand) Peter Janson	Holden VL Commodore SS Group A SV	A	153	10th	10th
1990	16	(Australia) Holden Racing Team	(United Kingdom) Win Percy	Holden VL Commodore SS Group A SV	1	161	1st	1st
1991	16	(Australia) Holden Racing Team	(United Kingdom) Win Percy	Holden VN Commodore SS Group A SV	1	160	2nd	2nd
1992	16	(Australia) Holden Racing Team	(United Kingdom) Win Percy	Holden VP Commodore	C	141	5th	1st
1994	18	(Australia) Shell-FAI Racing	(Australia) Steven Johnson	Ford EB Falcon	A	160	7th	7th
1995	35	(Australia) Peter Jackson Racing	(Australia) Alan Jones	Ford EF Falcon		161	2nd	2nd
1996	301	(Australia) Pack Leader Racing	(Australia) Alan Jones	Ford EF Falcon		25	DNF	DNF
1997	24	(Australia) Romano Racing	(Australia) Paul Romano	Holden VS Commodore	S1	69	DNF	DNF
2002	87	(Australia) Nilsson Motorsport	(Australia) Peter Doulman (Australia) Ross Halliday	Ford AU Falcon		1	DNF	DNF

=== Complete Sandown Endurance results ===
Year	Team	Co-drivers	Car	Class	Laps	Pos.	Class pos.
1975	(Australia) Craven Mild Racing		Holden LH Torana SL/R 5000 L34	A	70	DNF	DNF
1976	(Australia) Craven Mild Racing		Holden LH Torana SL/R 5000 L34	A	NA	DNF	DNF
1977	(Australia) Craven Mild Racing		Holden LX Torana SS A9X Hatchback	A	128	2nd	2nd
1978	(Australia) Craven Mild Racing		Holden LX Torana SS A9X Hatchback	6000cc	122	4th	4th
1979	(Australia) Craven Mild Racing		Holden LX Torana SS A9X Hatchback	A	NA	DNF	DNF
1980	(Australia) Craven Mild Racing		Holden VC Commodore	A	NA	DNF	DNF
1981	(Australia) JPS Team BMW		BMW 635 CSi	A	114	7th	7th
1982	(Australia) Re-Car Racing		Holden VH Commodore SS	D	109	2nd	2nd
1983	(Australia) STP Roadways Racing	(Australia) Colin Bond	Holden VH Commodore SS	Over 3000cc	NA	DNF	DNF
1984	(Australia) Roadways Racing	(Australia) Steve Harrington	Holden VK Commodore SS	Over 3000cc	103	DNF	DNF
1985	(Australia) Super K-Mart (Australia) Roadways Racing Services	(Australia) Warren Cullen	Holden VK Commodore SS	A	68	DNF	DNF
1986	(Australia) Roadways Racing	(Australia) Graeme Bailey	Holden VK Commodore SS Group A	A	128	3rd	3rd
1987	(Australia) Roadways Racing	(United Kingdom) Win Percy	Holden VL Commodore SS Group A	A	2	DNF	DNF
1991	(Australia) Holden Racing Team	(United Kingdom) Win Percy	Holden VN Commodore SS Group A SV	A	101	DNF	DNF
1992	(Australia) Holden Racing Team	(United Kingdom) Win Percy	Holden VP Commodore	3A	109	DNF	DNF
1993	(Australia) Holden Racing Team	(Australia) Brad Jones (Australia) Tomas Mezera	Holden VP Commodore	V8	150	DNF	DNF
1994	(Australia) Shell FAI Racing	(Australia) Steven Johnson	Ford EB Falcon	V8	159	8th	8th
1995	(Australia) Peter Jackson Racing	(Australia) Glenn Seton	Ford EF Falcon		161	2nd	2nd
1996	(Australia) Pack Leader Racing	(Australia) Alan Jones	Ford EF Falcon		110	DNF	DNF
1997	(Australia) Romano Racing	(Australia) Paul Romano	Holden VS Commodore		144	DNF	DNF

=== Complete 24 Hours of Le Mans results ===
Year	Team	Co-drivers	Car	Class	Laps	Pos.	Class pos.
1984	(United Kingdom) Charles Ivey Racing	(United Kingdom) Alain de Cadenet (United Kingdom) Chris Craft	Porsche 956B	C1	274	DNF	DNF
1988	(Japan) Nissan Motorsports	(United Kingdom) Mike Wilds (United Kingdom) Win Percy	Nissan R88C	C1	344	14th	13th

=== Complete Spa 24 Hour results ===
Year	Team	Co-drivers	Car	Class	Laps	Pos.	Class pos.
1986	(Australia) Australian National Motor Racing Team	(Belgium) Michel Delcourt (Belgium) Alex Guyaux	Holden VK Commodore SS Group A	Div.3	397	23rd*	12th
1987	(West Germany) Schnitzer Motorsport	(Brazil) Roberto Moreno (West Germany) Wilhelm Siller	BMW M3	Div.2	178	DNF	DNF
1988	(United Kingdom) Nissan Motorsports Europe	(United Kingdom) Win Percy (Sweden) Anders Olofsson	Nissan Skyline HR31 GTS-R	Div.3	482	6th	4th

* 1986 Kings Cup winner at Spa along with the Holden Dealer Team.

=== Complete Bathurst 12 Hour results ===
Year	Team	Co-drivers	Car	Class	Laps	Pos.	Class pos.
1991	(Australia) Fitzgerald Racing	(Australia) Peter Fitzgerald (Australia) Nigel Arkell	Toyota Supra Turbo	T	242	1st	1st
1992	(Australia) Akubra Felt Hats	(Australia) Brad Jones (Australia) John Spencer	Holden VP Ute SS	D	226	26th	6th
1993	(Australia) Hardie Iplex Pipe	(Australia) John Bourke	Toyota Supra	T	214	33rd	8th

=== Complete Bathurst 24 Hour results ===
Year	Team	Co-drivers	Car	Class	Laps	Pos.	Class pos.
2002	(United Kingdom) Cirtek Motorsport	(Australia) David Brabham (Austria) Manfred Jurasz (Australia) Darren Palmer	Porsche 996 GT3 RS	1	488	DNF	DNF

Sporting positions
Preceded by John Goss; Armin Hahne	Winner of the Bathurst 1000; 1986 (with Graeme Bailey)	Succeeded by Peter Brock; David Parsons; Peter McLeod
Preceded by Dick Johnson; John Bowe	Winner of the Bathurst 1000; 1990 (with Win Percy)	Succeeded by Jim Richards; Mark Skaife
Preceded by None	Winner of the Bathurst 12 Hour; 1991 (with Peter Fitzgerald & Nigel Arkell)	Succeeded by Charlie O'Brien; Garry Waldon; Mark Gibbs
Parliament of Queensland
Preceded by New seat	Member for Broadwater; 1992–2001	Succeeded by Peta-Kaye Croft
