= 1981 Australian Touring Car Championship =

Motor racing competition

Seasons
- ← 1980 1982 →

The 1981 Australian Touring Car Championship was a CAMS sanctioned motor racing title for drivers of Group C Touring Cars. The championship, which was the 22nd running of the Australian Touring Car Championship, began at Symmons Plains Raceway and ended at Lakeside International Raceway after 8 rounds.

Dick Johnson, using the Ford XD Falcon built with the money he received after TV viewers had pledged AUD$72,000 following his crash with 'The Rock' at Bathurst the previous year (Ford Australia boss of the day Edsel Ford II had personally matched the amount dollar for dollar), won his first ATCC ahead of defending champion Peter Brock in his Holden Dealer Team Commodore. Johnson and Brock were the only drivers to win during the championship which came down to the final round on Dick's home track at Lakeside. Johnson won the race from Brock, the two battling all the way to the Chequered flag in what many believe to be one of the best ATCC races in history. Johnson later praised Brock, claiming that he had every opportunity to punt him off the road at Lakeside, while Brock also praised Johnson who held his nerve and won a clean race.

== Classes ==
Cars competed in two engine displacement classes:

- Up to and including 3000cc
- 3001–6000cc

== Points system ==
Championship points were awarded on a 9-6-4-3-2-1 basis to the first six placegetters in each class at each round. Bonus points were awarded on a 4-3-2-1 basis to the top four placegetters irrespective of class at each round. Only the best seven round results could be retained by each driver.

Round positions at rounds which were run in two parts were determined by allocating points on a 20-16-13-11-10-9-8-7-6-5-4-3-2-1 basis to the first fourteen placegetters in each part. These points were then aggregated to determine the results for that round. However a different method of determining round positions was used for Round 6 at Adelaide International Raceway where points were allocated on a 20-16-13-11-10-9-8-7-6-5-4-3-2-1 basis to the first fourteen placegetters in each class in each part.

== Entrants and drivers ==
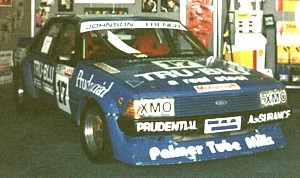
Dick Johnson won the championship driving a Ford XD Falcon.

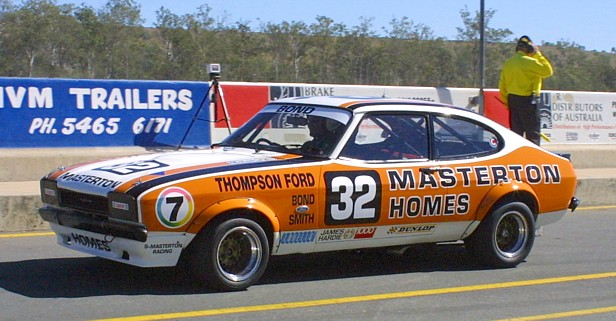
Colin Bond placed third driving a Ford Capri Mk II. The car is pictured in 2005.

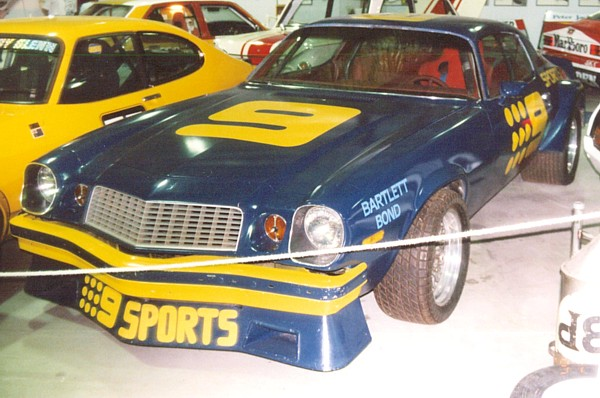
Kevin Bartlett placed 11th driving a Chevrolet Camaro. The car is pictured in 1997

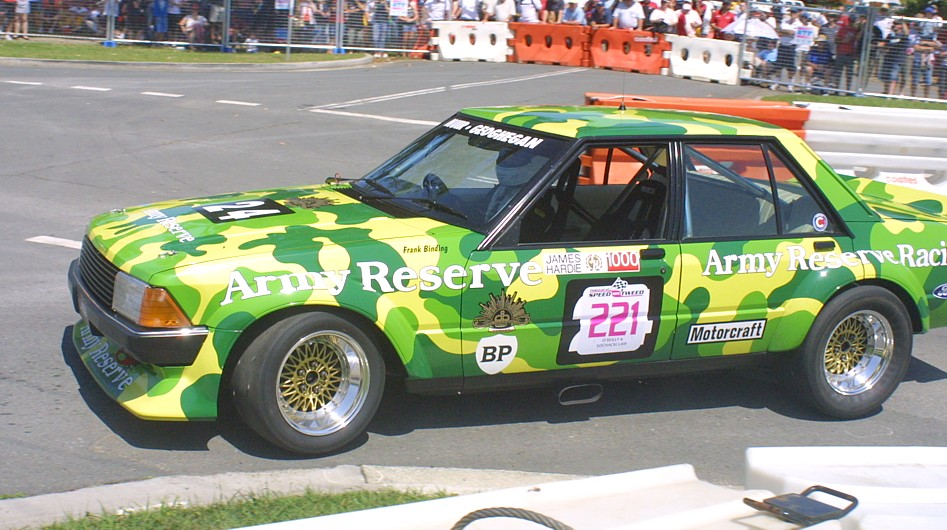
Bob Muir placed 20th driving a Ford XD Falcon. The car is pictured in 2009.

The following entrants and drivers competed in the 1981 Australian Touring Car Championship.

Entrant	Car	No	Driver
Citizen Watches	Holden VB Commodore	2	Gary Cooke
Cadbury-Schweppes	Holden VC Commodore	3	Peter Janson
Re-Car Racing	Holden VC Commodore	3	Alan Browne
Re-Car Racing	Holden VC Commodore	4	Alan Browne
Toms Tyres	Holden VC Commodore	4	Wayne Negus
Marlboro Holden Dealer Team	Holden VC Commodore	05	Peter Brock
Rusty French	Ford XD Falcon	6	Rusty French
Bob Morris	Ford XD Falcon	7	Bob Morris
Launceston Hotel	Holden VC Commodore	7	Larry Perkins
Garry Willmington	Ford XD Falcon	8	Garry Willmington
Nine Network Racing Team	Chevrolet Camaro Z28	9	Kevin Bartlett
Roadways Racing	Holden VC Commodore	10	Steve Harrington
Allan Grice Racing Pty. Ltd.	BMW 635CSi	11	Allan Grice
Warren Cullen	Holden VC Commodore	12	Warren Cullen
John English	Ford XD Falcon	14	John English
Neil Cunningham	Holden VC Commodore	16	Neil Cunningham
Tru-Blu Steel Tubing	Ford XD Falcon	17	Dick Johnson
Murray Carter	Ford XD Falcon	18	Murray Carter
Phil Lyon	Holden VB Commodore	23	Phil Lyon
Army Reserve Racing Team	Ford XD Falcon	24	Bob Muir
Ray Allford	Ford XD Falcon	26	Ray Allford
Capri Components	Ford Capri Mk III	29	Lawrie Nelson
Peter McLeod	Mazda RX-7	30	Peter McLeod
Masterton Homes	Ford Capri Mk II	31	Colin Bond
Masterton Homes	Ford Capri Mk II	32	Steve Masterton
John Smith	Ford XD Falcon	33	John Smith
Northside Mazda	Mazda RX-7	34	Terry Shiel
Phil Alexander	Mazda RX-3	35	Phil Alexander
Mulgrave Mazda; Belgrave Mazda	Mazda RX-3	41	Frank Porter
Michael O'Hehir	Mazda RX-3	42	Michael O'Hehir
J. Beninca; Beninca Motors	Alfa Romeo Alfetta GTV	46	Joe Beninca
L. & J.F. Parshen	Mazda RX-3	46	Ross Burbidge
Brian Callaghan	Ford XD Falcon	47	Brian Callaghan
Evan Thomas	Mazda RX-3	48	Evan Thomas
Chickadee Chicken	Toyota Celica	53	Graeme Bailey
Craig Bradtke	Mitsubishi Lancer	57	Craig Bradtke
Country Dealer Team	Isuzu Gemini	60	Jim Faneco
Garry Everitt	Mazda RX-3	61	Garry Everitt
Alexandra Surplice	Toyota Corolla Levin	62	Alexandra Surplice
Hooley Auto Electrics	Holden VC Commodore	71	Graeme Hooley
Guy Chenery	Ford Escort	75	Guy Chenery
Toyota Dealer Team	Toyota Celica	77	Peter Williamson
Toyota Dealer Team	Toyota Celica	77	John Smith
Gary Whittaker	Holden LX Torana SLR 5000 A9X	78	Gary Whittaker
Phil Walton	Toyota Celica	79	Phil Walton
Bill O'Brien	Ford XD Falcon	80	Bill O'Brien
John Bristow	Toyota Celica	81	John Bristow
G.K. Engineering	Ford Escort RS2000	95	Darryl Gretgrix
?	Ford Escort RS2000	?	Graham Mein

== Results and standings ==
=== Race calendar ===
The 1981 Australian Touring Car Championship was contested over an eight-round series with Rounds 1, 3, 5, 7 & 8 being single race rounds and Rounds 2, 4 & 6 being two race rounds.

Rd.	Race title	Circuit	City / state	Date	Winner	Team	Report
1	Symmons Plains	Symmons Plains Raceway	Launceston, Tasmania	1 Mar	Dick Johnson	Palmer Tube Mills	
2	Yella Terra Trophy	Calder Park Raceway	Melbourne, Victoria	15 Mar	Peter Brock	Marlboro Holden Dealer Team	
3	Marlboro Cup	Oran Park Raceway	Sydney, New South Wales	22 Mar	Dick Johnson	Palmer Tube Mills	
4	Bill Patterson Trophy Race	Sandown Raceway	Melbourne, Victoria	12 Apr	Dick Johnson	Palmer Tube Mills	
5	Saab-Scania Trophy	Wanneroo Park	Perth, Western Australia	26 Apr	Peter Brock	Marlboro Holden Dealer Team	
6	Adelaide	Adelaide International Raceway	Adelaide, South Australia	3 May	Peter Brock	Marlboro Holden Dealer Team	
7	Surfers Paradise	Surfers Paradise Raceway	Surfers Paradise, Queensland	17 May	Dick Johnson	Palmer Tube Mills	
8	Lakeside	Lakeside International Raceway	Brisbane, Queensland	21 Jun	Dick Johnson	Palmer Tube Mills	

=== Championship standings ===
Pos	Driver	Car	Sym	Cal	Ora	San	Wan	Ade	Sur	Lak	Pts
1	Dick Johnson	Ford XD Falcon	13	(6)	13	13	9	9	13	13	83
2	Peter Brock	Holden VC Commodore	9	13	9	Ret	13	13	9	9	75
3	Colin Bond	Ford Capri Mk II	9	9	9	9	9	9	9		63
4	Steve Masterton	Ford Capri Mk II	6	6		6	6	3	6		33
5	Murray Carter	Ford XD Falcon	6	9		1	6	2	1		25
6	Peter Janson	Holden VC Commodore	4	2	2	6		4	6		24
7	Alan Browne	Holden VC Commodore		4		4	4		4	4	20
8	Peter Williamson	Toyota Celica		4	6	4		4			18
9	Graeme Bailey	Toyota Celica			4			2		9	15
10	Steve Harrington	Holden VC Commodore	2	1		2	2			6	13
11	Kevin Bartlett	Chevrolet Camaro Z28			6			6			12
12	Allan Grice	BMW 635CSi				9					9
12	Frank Porter	Mazda RX-3				3		6			9
14	Lawrie Nelson	Ford Capri Mk III	4	3							7
15	Ross Burbidge	Mazda RX-3								6	6
15	Evan Thomas	Mazda RX-3							2	4	6
17	Peter McLeod	Mazda RX-7					4	1			5
18	Gary Cooke	Holden VB Commodore			4						4
18	Terry Shiel	Mazda RX-7							4		4
20	Michael O'Hehir	Mazda RX-3			3						3
20	Graham Mein	Ford Escort RS2000							3		3
20	Bob Muir	Ford XD Falcon			1					2	3
23	Joe Beninca	Alfa Romeo Alfetta GTV		2							2
23	Alexandra Surplice	Toyota Corolla			2						2
23	Neil Cunningham	Holden VC Commodore							2		2
26	Jim Faneco	Isuzu Gemini		1							1
26	Graeme Hooley	Holden VC Commodore					1				1
26	Larry Perkins	Holden VC Commodore						1			1
26	Greg Symes	Triumph Dolomite Sprint							1		1
26	Gary Whittaker	Holden LX Torana SLR 5000 A9X								1	1
Pos	Driver	Car	Sym	Cal	Ora	San	Wan	Ade	Sur	Lak	Pts

Colour	Result
Gold	Winner
Silver	Second place
Bronze	Third place
Green	Points classification
Blue	Non-points classification
Blue	Non-classified finish (NC)
Purple	Retired, not classified (Ret)
Red	Did not qualify (DNQ)
Red	Did not pre-qualify (DNPQ)
Black	Disqualified (DSQ)
White	Did not start (DNS)
White	Withdrew (WD)
White	Race cancelled (C)
Blank	Did not practice (DNP)
Blank	Did not arrive (DNA)
Blank	Excluded (EX)

Note: Points which could not be retained under the "best seven rounds" rule are shown in the above table within brackets.
