= 1972 Australian Formula 2 Championship =

Motor racing competition

The 1972 Australian Formula 2 Championship was a CAMS sanctioned Australian motor racing title open to racing cars complying with Australian Formula 2. It was the sixth Australian Formula 2 Championship. The title was won by Larry Perkins driving an Elfin 600B/E Ford.

== Calendar ==
The championship was contested over a seven round series with one race per round.

Round	Circuit	Date	Winner	Car
1	Calder	16 January	Vern Hamilton	Elfin 600B Ford
2	Hume Weir	2 April	Ivan Tighe	Elfin 600B Ford
3	Oran Park	25 June	Jack Bono	Elfin 600B Ford
4	Amaroo Park	23 July	Larry Perkins	Elfin 600B/E Ford
5	Surfers Paradise	27 August	Larry Perkins	Elfin 600B/E Ford
6	Symmons Plains	24 September	Larry Perkins	Elfin 600B/E Ford
7	Adelaide International Raceway	8 October	Larry Perkins	Elfin 600B/E Ford

Note: Rounds 3, 5, 6 & 7 were each run concurrently with rounds of the 1972 Australian Drivers' Championship.

== Points system ==
Championship points were awarded on a 9-6-4-3-2-1 basis to the first six placegetters.

== Championship results ==
Position	Driver	Car	Entrant	Cal	Hum	Ora	Ama	Sur	Sym	Ade	Total
1	Larry Perkins	Elfin 600B/E Ford	Provincial Motors	-	-	-	9	9	9	9	36
2	Vern Hamilton	Elfin 600B Ford	Vern Hamilton	9	-	3	-	6	-	-	18
3	Jack Bono	Elfin 600B Ford	Graham Collier	-	-	9	6	-	-	-	15
4	Ivan Tighe	Elfin 600B Ford	Ivan Tighe	-	9	-	2	-	4	-	15
5	Ken Hastings	McLaren M4A Ford	Ken Hastings	3	4	4	-	-	3	-	14
6	Allan Grice	Mildren Waggott & Mildren England	Max Stewart Motors & Alan Grice	-	-	2	4	4	-	-	10
7	Don Uebergang	Elfin 600B	Don Uebergang	6	2	-	-	-	-	-	8
8	Ian Fergusson	Bowin P3a Ford	Ian Fergusson	-	-	6	1	-	-	-	7
9	Clive Millis	Elfin 600B	Clive Millis Motors	-	6	-	-	-	-	-	6
	Tony Stewart	Dolphin England	AE Stewart	-	-	-	-	-	6	-	6
11	Peter Larner	Rennmax BN2	Roberts Auto Spares	4	-	-	-	-	-	-	4
12	Peter Macrow	Cheetah	Peter Macrow	-	3	-	-	-	-	-	3
	Chris Milton	Elfin 600B	Shell Racing – Volkwreck	-	-	-	3	-	-	-	3
14	Garry Campbell	Elfin 600B	Provincial Motors	2	-	-	-	-	-	-	2
15	Bob Punch	Elfin Mono	Bob Punch	1	-	-	-	-	-	-	1
	Michael Hall	Elfin 600B	Michael Hall	-	1	-	-	-	-	-	1
	Chris Farrell	Brabham BT6 Ford	BP GordonService Station	-	-	1	-	-	-	-	1
