= Peter Janson =

Australian socialite and motor racing driver

- Nationality: (New Zealand) New Zealander
- Born: 10 April 1940 (age 86)
- Retired: 1992

Australian Touring Car Championship
- Years active: 1973–92

Percy Pierre Gustaf "Peter" Janson (born 10 April 1940 in New Zealand) is an Australian socialite and former motor racing driver.

Janson was born in New Zealand, emigrating to England at a young age. In 1967, he moved to Australia and settled in Melbourne.

Janson, who listed his occupation as "Gentleman", established a playboy penthouse in the Federal Hotel before moving to the Hotel Windsor. In the 1980s he moved to Rutherglen House. Janson is renowned for the parties he throws, and was a pioneer in transforming the Melbourne Cup into a major event on the Australian social calendar.

Often referred to as "The Captain" or "Captain Peter Janson", this allegedly comes from that he was either a Captain in the Indian Army while being the Trade Commissioner for Australia in India, or he was allegedly a Captain in the Bhutan Air Force.

== Motor racing ==
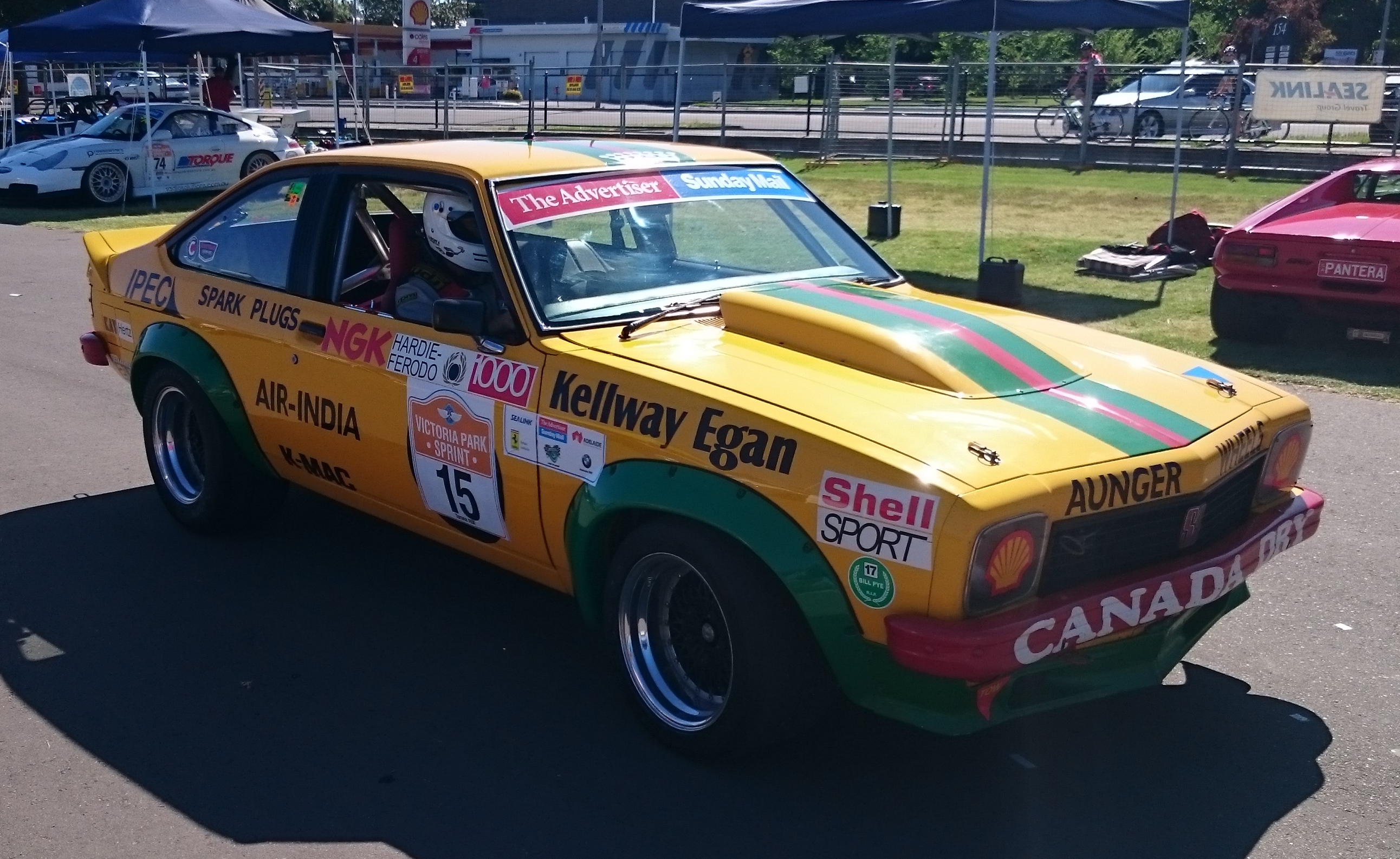
Janson raced a Holden Torana SS A9X from 1977 to 1979. (Car pictured in 2015)

Janson was a competitor in Australian Touring Car Racing. He made 19 Bathurst 1000 starts between 1973 and 1992 primarily in Holden Toranas and Commodores, finishing second in 1979 and 1980 and third in 1977 (all of his podium finishes were with Larry Perkins who would go on to be a six time winner of the race). With the end of the Group C era in 1984, Janson closed his team but continued to drive for other teams including joining Sydney based privateer Garry Wilmington in a V12 Jaguar XJS in the 1985 and 1986 races.

Janson later scored a class win and fourth outright driving a BMW M3 with fellow Kiwi Trevor Crowe at the 1988 Bathurst 1000, though that class win wasn't without its trials. Unlike the ultra-fit triathlete Crowe, Janson wasn't all that into exercise, not to mention that he regularly smoked cigars, and unlike the lazy V8's and V12's he had raced previously at Bathurst, the 4-cylinder BMW required the driver to be a lot more on the ball physically and mentally. At one point late in the race before his minimum drive time was over, an exhausted Janson drove into the pits and "fell out of the car", though he was coaxed back out onto the track by the team (their position in class was safe) for a few more (slow) laps before handing over to Crowe to finish the race.

Janson's last appearance at Bathurst was in 1992 where he and Bob Jones finished 20th in a Holden VL Commodore SS Group A SV.

Always a colourful character who gave his sponsors a plug at every opportunity, especially when being interviewed in the pits, Janson briefly changed his name by deed poll in the mid-1970s to NGK Janson to circumvent a CAMS (Confederation of Australian Motor Sport) rule that only allowed a driver's name to be carried above the window line. His former co-driver Larry Perkins also told that one year on a parade lap at Bathurst, Janson continually pulled the car off onto the grass in order to throw Cherry Ripe chocolate bars out to the crowd (his major sponsor being Cadbury Schweppes).

== Career results ==
Results sourced from Driver Database.

Season	Series	Position	Car	Team
1976	Australian Touring Car Championship	14th	Holden LH Torana SL/R 5000 L34	Peter Janson
1977	Australian Touring Car Championship	11th	Holden LH Torana SL/R 5000 L34; Holden LX Torana SS A9X Hatchback	Captain Peter Janson
1978	Australian Touring Car Championship	30th	Holden LX Torana SS A9X Hatchback	Cadbury - Schweppes
1979	Australian Touring Car Championship	16th	Holden LX Torana SS A9X Hatchback	Cadbury Schweppes Racing
1980	Australian Touring Car Championship	30th	Holden LX Torana SS A9X Hatchback	Cadbury Schweppes Racing
1981	Australian Touring Car Championship	6th	Holden VC Commodore	Cadbury Schweppes Racing
1982	Australian Touring Car Championship	27th	Holden VC Commodore	Cadbury Schweppes Racing
1982	Australian Endurance Championship	48th	Holden VH Commodore SS	Cadbury Schweppes Racing
1983	Australian Endurance Championship	NC	Holden VH Commodore SS	Cadbury Schweppes Racing
1984	Australian Endurance Championship	NC	Holden VH Commodore SS	Cadbury Schweppes Racing
1984	World Endurance Championship	NC	Porsche Kremer CK5	Porsche Kremer Racing
1985	Australian Endurance Championship	69th	Jaguar XJS	Garry Willmington
1986	Australian Endurance Championship	NC	Jaguar XJS	Garry Willmington
1987	World Touring Car Championship	NC	Holden VK Commodore SS Group A	Petro-Tech
1988	Asia-Pacific Touring Car Championship	9th	BMW M3	John Sax
1990	Australian Endurance Championship	NC	Holden VL Commodore SS Group A SV	Lusty Engineering
1991	Australian Endurance Championship	NC	Holden VL Commodore SS Group A SV	Peter Janson

=== Complete World Endurance Championship results ===
(key) (Races in bold indicate pole position) (Races in italics indicate fastest lap)

Year	Team	Car	1	2	3	4	5	6	7	8	9	10	11	DC	Points
1984	(West Germany) Porsche Kremer Racing	Porsche Kremer CK5	MNZ	SIL	LMS	NUR	BRA	MOS	SPA	IMO	FJI	KYL	SAN; 13	NC	0

=== Complete Australian Touring Car Championship results ===
(key) (Races in bold indicate pole position) (Races in italics indicate fastest lap)

Year	Team	Car	1	2	3	4	5	6	7	8	9	10	11	DC	Points
1976	(Australia) Captain Peter Janson	Holden LH Torana SL/R 5000 L34	SYM; 5	CAL	ORA; 10	SAN	AMA	AIR; 10	LAK	SAN	AIR	SUR	PHI; 3	14th	10
1977	(Australia) Ipec	Holden LH Torana SL/R 5000 L34 Holden LX Torana SS A9X Hatchback	SYM	CAL; Ret	ORA; 10	AMA	SAN	AIR	LAK	SAN; Ret	AIR; 5	SUR	PHI; 2	11th	13
1978	(Australia) Cadbury - Schweppes	Holden LX Torana SS A9X Hatchback	SYM	ORA	AMA	SAN	WAN	CAL; 5	LAK	AIR				30th	2
1979	(Australia) Cadbury Schweppes Racing	Holden LX Torana SS A9X Hatchback	SYM	CAL; 4	ORA	SAN	WAN	SUR; 6	LAK	AIR				16th	5
1980	(Australia) Cadbury Schweppes Racing	Holden LX Torana SS A9X Hatchback	SYM	CAL	LAK	SAN; 5	WAN	SUR	AIR	ORA				30th	2
1981	(Australia) Cadbury Schweppes Racing	Holden VC Commodore	SYM; 4	CAL; 5	LAK; 5	SAN; 3	WAN	AIR; 4	SUR; 3	ORA				6th	24
1982	(Australia) Cadbury Schweppes Racing	Holden VC Commodore	SAN	CAL; 4	SYM	ORA; Ret	LAK	WAN	AIR	SUR				27th	5

=== Complete World Touring Car Championship results ===
(key) (Races in bold indicate pole position) (Races in italics indicate fastest lap)

Year	Team	Car	1	2	3	4	5	6	7	8	9	10	11	DC	Points
1987	(Australia) Petro-Tech	Holden VK Commodore SS Group A	MNZ	JAR	DIJ	NUR	SPA	BNO	SIL	BAT ovr:18 cls:12	CLD	WEL	FJI	NC	0

† Not eligible for series points

=== Complete Bathurst 1000 results ===
Year	Car#	Team	Co-drivers	Car	Class	Laps	Pos.	Class pos.
1973	54	(Australia) John Lord	(Australia) John Lord	Honda Civic	A	134	22nd	4th
1974	23	(Australia) Taylor’s College Racing	(Australia) Paul Feltham	Holden LH Torana SL/R 5000	3001 – 6000cc	-	DNS	DNS
1975	17	(Australia) Massey Holden	(Australia) John Harvey	Holden LH Torana SL/R 5000 L34	D	143	DNF	DNF
1976	15	(Australia) Captain Peter Janson	(Australia) Kevin Bartlett	Holden LH Torana SL/R 5000 L34	3001cc - 6000cc	158	5th	5th
1977	15	(Australia) NGK Janson	(Australia) Larry Perkins	Holden LX Torana SS A9X Hatchback	3001cc – 6000cc	162	3rd	3rd
1978	9	(Australia) ReCar Racing (Australia) Cadbury - Schweppes	(Australia) Phil Brock	Holden LX Torana SS A9X Hatchback	3001cc – 6000cc	110	DNF	DNF
1979	19	(Australia) Cadbury Schweppes Racing	(Australia) Larry Perkins	Holden LX Torana SS A9X Hatchback	A	157	2nd	2nd
1980	4	(Australia) Cadbury Schweppes Racing	(Australia) Larry Perkins	Holden VC Commodore	3001-6000cc	162	2nd	2nd
1981	3	(Australia) Cadbury Schweppes Racing	(Australia) Larry Perkins	Holden VC Commodore	8 Cylinder & Over	67	DNF	DNF
1982	3	(Australia) Cadbury Schweppes Racing	(Australia) David Parsons	Holden VH Commodore SS	A	158	4th	4th
1983	3	(Australia) Cadbury Schweppes Racing	(Australia) David Parsons	Holden VH Commodore SS	A	106	DNF	DNF
1984	3	(Australia) Cadbury Schweppes Racing	(Australia) Garry Rogers	Holden VH Commodore SS	Group C	109	DNF	DNF
1985	12	(Australia) Garry Willmington	(Australia) Garry Willmington	Jaguar XJS	C	150	14th	12th
1986	12	(Australia) Garry Willmington	(Australia) Garry Willmington	Jaguar XJS	C	88	DNF	DNF
1987	3	(Australia) Petro-Tech	(Australia) Peter Fitzgerald	Holden VK Commodore SS Group A	1	144	18th	12th
1988	53	(New Zealand) John Sax	(New Zealand) Trevor Crowe	BMW M3	1	156	4th	1st
1989	15	(Australia) ICL Racing	(Australia) Allan Grice	Holden VL Commodore SS Group A SV	A	153	10th	10th
1990	22	(Australia) Lusty Engineering	(Australia) Graham Lusty	Holden VL Commodore SS Group A SV	1	83	DNF	DNF
1991	13	(Australia) Peter Janson	(Australia) Peter Gazzard	Holden VL Commodore SS Group A SV	1	53	DNF	DNF
1992	13	(Australia) Ampol Max 3 Racing	(Australia) Bob Jones	Holden VL Commodore SS Group A SV	A	128	20th	18th
