= South Pacific Touring Car Championship =

- Category: Touring car racing
- Country: Australia; New Zealand
- Inaugural season: 1986
- Folded: 1987
- Last Drivers' champion: Allan Grice
- Last Makes' champion: BMW
- Last Teams' champion: NA

The South Pacific Touring Car Championship was a motorsport championship staged in Australia and New Zealand for Group A touring cars between October and December in 1986. The championship was won by Australian driver Allan Grice.

The series received little support from the top teams, especially the Australians other than for the first two rounds held in Australia, while all bar a couple of the New Zealand teams only contested NZ races. Once the series went to New Zealand, Grice and Charlie O'Brien were in fact the only Australian drivers to support the series while those such as Peter Jackson Nissan, JPS Team BMW and the Holden Dealer Team completely ignored the NZ races.

The series was reportedly set to continue in 1987, however after the first race in Adelaide, interest flagged as the Australian teams were not interested in going to New Zealand after a long season which included the 1987 World Touring Car Championship rounds at Bathurst, Calder and Wellington and the series was cancelled.

== Champions ==
Year	Driver	Team	Car
1986	(Australia) Allan Grice	Roadways Racing; Team Nissan Racing NZ	Holden VK Commodore SS Group A Nissan Skyline DR30 RS
1987	(Australia) Dick Johnson	Shell Ultra Hi-Tech Racing Team	Ford Sierra RS500

== 1986 race calendar ==
The 1986 South Pacific Touring Car Championship was contested over a five-round series with two races in Australia and three races in New Zealand.

Round 1 of the series also doubled as Round 5 of the 1986 Australian Endurance Championship, while Round 2 in Adelaide also doubled as the Group A support race at the 1986 Australian Formula One Grand Prix.

Rd.	Race title	Circuit	City	Date	Winner	Car	Team	Report
1	The Sun South Pacific 300	Calder Park Raceway	Melbourne	19 October	(Australia) George Fury (Australia) Glenn Seton	Nissan Skyline DR30 RS	Peter Jackson Nissan Racing	
2	South Australia Cup	Adelaide Street Circuit	Adelaide	25 October	(Australia) Allan Grice	Holden VK Commodore SS Group A	Roadways Racing	
3	Manfeild SPTCC	Manfeild Autocourse	Palmerston North	30 November	(New Zealand) Graeme Crosby (New Zealand) Wayne Wilkinson	Holden VK Commodore SS Group A	Bob Jane T-Marts	
4	Baypark SPTCC	Baypark Raceway	Mount Maunganui	7 December	(Australia) Allan Grice (New Zealand) Kent Baigent	Nissan Skyline DR30 RS	Team Nissan Racing NZ	
5	Pukekohe SPTCC	Pukekohe Park Raceway	Pukekohe	14 December	(Australia) Charlie O'Brien (New Zealand) Glenn McIntyre	BMW 635 CSi	State Coal BMW	

== Championship results ==
Position	Driver	Team	Car	Points
1	(Australia) Allan Grice	Roadways Racing; Team Nissan Racing NZ	Holden VK Commodore SS Group A Nissan Skyline DR30 RS	81
2	(New Zealand) Trevor Crowe	Archibalds	BMW 635 CSi	73
3	(New Zealand) Graeme Crosby	Bob Jane T-Marts	Holden VK Commodore SS Group A	67
4	(Australia) Charlie O'Brien	Bob Jane T-Marts; State Coal BMW	BMW 635 CSi	66
4	(New Zealand) Glenn McIntyre	State Coal BMW	BMW 635 CSi	66
6	(Australia) George Fury	Peter Jackson Nissan Racing	Nissan Skyline DR30 RS	57
7	(New Zealand) Ed Lamont	Lamont Racing/Can-Am Construction	BMW 325i	55
8	(Australia) Glenn Seton	Peter Jackson Nissan Racing	Nissan Skyline DR30 RS	47
9	(New Zealand) Robbie Ker		Ford Mustang GT	45
9	(New Zealand) Wayne Huxford		Ford Mustang GT	45
11	(New Zealand) Wayne Wilkinson	Bob Jane T-Marts	Holden VK Commodore SS Group A	43
11	(New Zealand) Graham Lorimer		BMW 635 CSi	43
11	(New Zealand) Tony Lawrence		BMW 635 CSi	43
14	(Australia) Larry Perkins	Perkins Engineering	Holden VK Commodore SS Group A	40
15	(Australia) John Harvey	Holden Dealer Team	Holden VK Commodore SS Group A	34
16	(New Zealand) Denny Hulme	Bob Jane T-Marts; Rocket Cargo/Bill Bryce	Mercedes-Benz 190E; BMW 325i	32
16	(New Zealand) Dave Barrow	Toyota Team New Zealand	Toyota Corolla FX-GT AE82	32
18	(New Zealand) Kent Baigent	Team Nissan Racing NZ	Nissan Skyline DR30 RS	30

== See also ==
- Touring car racing
- Group A
- Australian Endurance Championship
