= 1987 European Touring Car Championship =

Seasons
- ← 1986 1988 →

The 1987 European Touring Car Championship was a motor racing competition for Group A Touring Cars. It was the 25th European series for Touring cars and the 19th to carry the European Touring Car Championship name. The Drivers Championship was won by Winfried Vogt driving a BMW M3 and the Manufacturers’ Championship by the BMW Linder #47 entry.

== Schedule ==
The championship was contested over a seven race series.

Race	Race name	Circuit	Country	Date	Winning drivers	Car	Team
1	Donington 500	Donington Park	United Kingdom	5 April	Winfried Vogt, Dieter Quester	BMW M3	Linder Rennsport
2		Autodromo do Estoril	Portugal	26 April	Johnny Cecotto, Gianfranco Brancatelli	BMW M3	CiBiEmme Sport
3	Anderstorp 500	Scandinavian Raceway, Anderstorp	Sweden	24 May	Winfried Vogt, Altfrid Heger	BMW M3	Linder Rennsport
4	EG Trophy	Zolder	Belgium	7 June	Klaus Niedzwiedz, Steve Soper, Pierre Dieudonné	Ford Sierra RS Cosworth	Eggenberger Motorsport
5	Preis der Steiermark	Österreichring, Zeltweg	Austria	14 June	Johnny Cecotto, Gianfranco Brancatelli	BMW M3	CiBiEmme Sport
6		Autodromo Dino Ferrari, Imola	Italy	28 June	Winfried Vogt, Altfrid Heger	BMW M3	Linder Rennsport
7		Circuit Paul Armagnac, Nogaro	France	13 September	Fabien Giroix, Jean-Pierre Jaussaud	BMW M3	Team Garage Du Bac

== Championship Results ==
=== Drivers Championship ===
Position	Driver	No.	Car	Division	Entrant	Don	Est	And	Zol	Öst	Imo	Nog	Total
1	Winfried Vogt	41 & 47	BMW M3	2	Linder Rennsport	40	-	40	40	30	40	30	220
2	Altfrid Heger	47	BMW M3	2	Linder Rennsport	30	-	40	40	30	40	30	210
3	Pierre Fermine	103	Toyota Corolla GT AE86	1	FINA Toyota	23	22	28	32	18	17	28	168
4	Serge De Liedekerke	103	Toyota Corolla GT AE86	1	FINA Toyota	23	22	28	32	18	17	28	168
5	Gianfranco Brancatelli	60 & 18	BMW M3 & BMW 635CSi	2 & 3	CiBiEmme Sport	-	40	35	-	40	35	-	150
6	Dieter Quester	41	BMW M3	2	Linder Rennsport	40	-	-	30	24	15	40	149
7	Markus Oestreich	47	BMW M3	2	Linder Rennsport	30	-	-	30	24	15	40	139
8	Oldrich Vanícek	51	BMW M3	2	úAMK	-	22	27	22	14	21	-	106
9	Vlastimil Tomásek	51	BMW M3	2	úAMK	-	22	27	22	14	21	-	106
10	Georges Bosshard	18	BMW 635CSi	3	Nocenti Racing / CiBiEmme	-	32	35	-	-	35	-	102
11	Giorgio Cipolli	20	Volvo 240 Turbo	2	SRS	-	23	-	-	16	27	30	96
12	Christer Simonsen	31	Volvo 240 Turbo	2	Team CMS Sweden	32	-	-	15	-	18	21	86
13	Kurt Simonsen	31	Volvo 240 Turbo	2	Team CMS Sweden	32	-	-	15	-	18	21	86
14	Onofrio Russo	10	Ford Sierra RS Cosworth	3	Jolly Club	-	-	25	26	12	22	-	85
15	Tiziano Serratini	10	Ford Sierra RS Cosworth	3	Jolly Club	-	-	25	26	12	22	-	85

=== Manufacturers Championship ===
Position	Manufacturer	No	Car	Division	Entrant	Don	Est	And	Zol	Öst	Imo	Nog	Total
1	BMW Linder #47	47	BMW M3	2	Linder Rennsport	30	-	40	40	30	40	30	210
2	FINA Toyota #103	103	Toyota Corolla GT AE86	1	FINA Toyota	23	22	28	32	18	17	28	168
3	BMW Linder #41	41	BMW M3	2	Linder Rennsport	40	-	-	30	24	15	40	149
4	BMW CiBiEmme #18	18	BMW 635CSi	3	Nocenti Racing / CiBiEmme	-	32	35	-	28?	35	-	130
5	BMW úAMK #51	51	BMW M3	2	úAMK	-	22	27	22	14	21	-	106
6	Volvo SRS #20	20	Volvo 240 Turbo	2	SRS	-	23	-	-	16	27	30	96
7	Volvo CMS #31	31	Volvo 240 Turbo	2	Team CMS Sweden	32	-	-	15	-	18	21	86
8	Ford Jolly Club #10	10	Ford Sierra RS Cosworth	3	Jolly Club	-	-	25	26	12	22	-	85
9	Toyota Gullivers Ltd. #92	92	Toyota Corolla GT AE86	1	Gullivers Ltd.	-	-	21	23	24	13	-	81
10	BMW CiBiEmme #60	60	BMW M3	2	CiBiEmme Sport	-	40	-	-	40	-	-	80
