= Roadways Racing =

- Manufacturer: Holden
- Owner: Ian Harrington; Les Small
- Race Drivers: Garth Wigston; Steve Harrington; Allan Grice; Colin Bond; Warren Cullen; Graeme Bailey; Michel Delcourt; Graeme Crosby; Win Percy; Garry Rogers; John Andretti; Peter Janson
- Chassis: Commodore VH; Commodore VK; Commodore VL

Roadways Racing was an Australian motor racing team that competed in Australian Touring Car racing in the 1980s. It also competed in the 1986 European Touring Car Championship.

== History ==
Roadways Racing’s origins can be traced back to 1976 when Tasmanian bituminous surfacing company Roadways became the title sponsor of the Gown-Hindhaugh team that raced Holden Toranas and Commodores in Australian Touring Car racing. In 1981 Roadways’ proprietor Ian Harrington bought the team. After considering closing the team at the end of 1984, Harrington elected to continue into the Group A era.

Roadways competed in the 1986 European Touring Car Championship with Allan Grice sharing the driving with Graeme Bailey and Michel Delcourt. Although funding was tight, Grice lead a number of races and usually out qualified the Holden Dealer Team. Roadways also prepared a customer car for Bailey in which he contested a few rounds of the 1986 Australian Touring Car Championship and teamed with Grice to win the 1986 Bathurst 1000.

After a plan to contest the 1987 World Touring Car Championship with a Nissan Skyline DR30 fell through, Roadways returned to compete in the 1987 Australian Touring Car Championship with a Holden Commodore VL. With Grice driving a Nissan Skyline HR31 in the European Touring Car Championship in 1988, the team sat out most of the season, only competing at the Bathurst 1000, Wellington 500, Pukekohe 500 and Adelaide with two TWR Commodore VLs that had been built for Garry Rogers.

In 1989 Les Small purchased the team from Harrington. It completed a limited campaign that year with Grice driving at Winton, Bathurst and Adelaide. By this stage Roadways had diversified into preparing AUSCARs and NASCARs. It built a Ford Falcon EB in 1993 for the new V8 series, but it never appeared on track.

The business has since been rebranded Advanced Vehicle Design and continues to manufacture components for racing cars in various categories including the V8 Ute Racing Series.
