= Mildren =

Mildren may refer to:

- Dean Mildren (born 1943), Australian judge
- Frank T. Mildren (1913–1990), American general
- Jack Mildren (1949–2008), American quarterback
- John Mildren (1932–2024), Australian politician
- Paul Mildren (born 1984), Australian former baseball pitcher
- Mildren (racing cars), a series of racing vehicles constructed for Australian racing team owner Alec Mildren during the 1960s and early 1970s.
