= Graeme Bailey =

Australian retired racing driver

- Nationality: (Australia) Australian
- Born: Graeme Alfred Bailey; 11 July 1943 (age 83) Ourimbah, New South Wales, Australia
- Retired: 1986

Australian Endurance Championship
- Years active: 1979–86
- Teams: Chickadee Racing

Previous series
- 1979-82: Australian Touring Car Championship

Championship titles
- 1986: Bathurst 1000

Graeme Alfred Bailey (born 11 July 1943) is an Australian former touring car racing driver and businessman from the Central Coast of New South Wales. A successful privateer competitor throughout the late 1970s and 1980s, Bailey won the 1986 James Hardie 1000 alongside Allan Grice driving a Holden VK Commodore. Prior to his Bathurst victory he established himself as one of Australia's leading privateer touring car competitors through successful campaigns in Toyota Celicas before stepping into outright contention with Peter McLeod in endurance racing. Outside motorsport, Bailey founded and operated Chickadee Foods, a Central Coast-based poultry processing and food manufacturing business.

== Early life ==
Bailey was born in Gosford, New South Wales, on 11 July 1943 and grew up on his family's mixed farm on the Central Coast. The family business combined poultry farming with orchards and vegetable production, and Bailey learned to drive farm vehicles from an early age. His interest in motor vehicles developed during his youth and eventually led him into competitive motorsport.

Before beginning circuit racing, Bailey competed in rallying with the local car club. His early competition cars included a Renault R8 and later a Holden HR X2, contesting both junior and senior state rally events.

== Racing career ==
=== Early circuit racing ===
Bailey switched from rallying to circuit racing in 1970, contesting the inaugural Toby Lee Series for Series Production Touring Cars at Oran Park in an XW Falcon GT-HO Phase II. Although he was unable to match the pace of leading drivers such as Fred Gibson and John Goss, the experience marked the beginning of his circuit racing career.

Following a brief campaign in the Falcon, Bailey purchased a Chrysler E38 Charger with the intention of continuing competition, although financial pressures within the family business prevented the car from being raced.

After another short break from competition he returned in the mid-1970s in a Barry Sharp-built XA Falcon Sports Sedan. The four-door Falcon, carrying Chickadee sponsorship, competed in New South Wales Sports Sedan racing and represented Bailey's first serious commitment to circuit racing.

=== Toyota Celica years ===
Bailey's touring car career developed significantly after purchasing an ex-Peter Williamson Toyota Celica, the same car that became well known during the 1977 Bathurst 1000 after Williamson's crew famously used an axe to open the damaged boot lid during a pit stop.

Bailey campaigned the Celica in the Australian Touring Car Championship support categories and endurance events, making his Bathurst debut in the 1979 Hardie-Ferodo 1000 alongside Doug Clark. Although the pair retired with engine failure after 46 laps, Bailey had already demonstrated the car's competitiveness by finishing inside the outright top ten at the 1979 Hang Ten 400.

He later acquired a second ex-Williamson RA40 Celica, continuing a close association with Toyota's leading touring car operation. Bailey and Doug Clark won the 1601–2000cc class at the 1980 Bathurst 1000 while finishing twelfth outright, adding to the Celica's growing reputation as one of Bathurst's most successful small-capacity touring cars. An attempt at a third consecutive class victory in 1981 ended after contact with John Harvey's Holden Dealer Team Commodore following Harvey's tyre failure at The Dipper.

Throughout the late 1970s and early 1980s Bailey established himself as one of Australia's leading Toyota privateers. His rivalry with Peter Williamson became a feature of under-3.0 litre touring car racing, with Bailey regularly challenging the factory-backed cars despite operating with significantly fewer resources. His performances in touring car endurance racing also contributed to Toyota's success in the Australian Manufacturers' Championship.

Bailey's final Bathurst appearance in a Celica came in 1982, when he and Steve Land retired with engine failure. By then, his consistent performances had earned him a reputation as one of Australia's benchmark privateer touring car competitors and prepared him for a move into outright contention.

=== Partnership with Peter McLeod ===
In 1983 Bailey graduated to outright competition in the endurance classics, joining fellow New South Wales privateer Peter McLeod as co-driver in McLeod's Mazda RX-7. The pairing quickly established itself as one of Australia's leading privateer endurance combinations, finishing fifth outright in the 1983 James Hardie 1000 behind only the leading factory-backed entries.

The result established Bailey as a genuine outright contender at Bathurst, bridging the gap between class competition and victory aspirations in Australia's premier endurance race.

The partnership continued in 1984, although overheating problems early in the race prevented Bailey from completing any laps during the race. McLeod switched to a Holden Commodore, built by Peter Pattenden, for the 1985 season and the pair again ran competitively before retiring late in the race with gearbox failure while holding fifth position.

Bailey later described his partnership with McLeod as one between two "Aussie battlers", with both drivers establishing themselves as the benchmark privateer combination during the mid-1980s. Their competitiveness against better-funded factory teams convinced Bailey that it was possible to campaign his own outright contender.

Following the 1985 season, Bailey elected to establish his own Group A Holden Commodore programme for 1986, bringing to an end his successful partnership with McLeod.

=== Group A and Bathurst victory ===
Following the 1985 season, Bailey established his own Group A programme around a new Holden VK Commodore backed by his Chickadee Foods business. Ordered late in 1985, the car was delivered in February 1986 in time for the opening round of the Australian Touring Car Championship at Amaroo Park on 2 March. Prior to delivery, Allan Grice assisted with the initial setup of the Commodore, before Bailey's full-time team manager, Peter Pattenden, assumed responsibility for preparing and maintaining the car throughout the Australian Touring Car Championship season. The new Commodore represented the culmination of Bailey's progression from successful privateer to genuine Bathurst contender, with the programme built specifically to challenge the factory-backed teams in Australia's major endurance races.

Less than a month after taking delivery of the Commodore, Bailey and Pattenden accepted an invitation to join Allan Grice and engineer Les Small in Europe to contest the opening three rounds of the 1986 European Touring Car Championship at Monza, Donington Park and Hockenheim in a sister Holden Commodore. Made possible in part through Bailey's Chickadee Foods sponsorship, the opportunity arose unexpectedly and at short notice, requiring the newly formed team to quickly shift its focus from the opening rounds of the Australian Touring Car Championship to an international campaign against many of the world's leading touring car teams. The experience proved invaluable, allowing the group to evaluate suspension, engine and tyre development under the demands of long-distance competition. Bailey later credited the European campaign with demonstrating the standard required to compete at the highest professional level and regarded it as instrumental in preparing the Chickadee team for the Australian endurance season.

Following the team's return to Australia, Bailey continued contesting selected rounds of the Australian Touring Car Championship with Pattenden preparing the Commodore, culminating in a competitive fourth-place finish at the Oran Park season finale after a race-long battle with John Bowe and Jim Richards, before Grice and Small joined the Chickadee programme for the endurance season. The partnership proved mutually beneficial, combining Bailey's established privateer operation with Grice's front-running experience and Small's engineering expertise to create a genuine contender for Australia's major endurance races.

It was at this point that responsibility for the Commodore's race preparation transferred to Les Small's Roadways Racing Services operation, where development focused on refining the car's performance and reliability using the lessons learned during the European campaign. According to Small, the repeated long-distance racing undertaken in Europe exposed weaknesses that could be addressed before the Australian endurance season, transforming the Commodore into a significantly more competitive and dependable package.

One of the programme's most significant technical developments was the adoption of 17-inch Yokohama tyres, making the Chickadee team among the first Australian touring car operations to race on the larger wheel and tyre combination. Experience gained in Europe demonstrated that the package provided improved tyre durability and more consistent handling over long race distances, becoming an important component of the team's endurance preparation.

The progress was evident at the 1986 Castrol 500 at Sandown, where Bailey and Grice emerged as genuine contenders before a jammed wheel nut during a pit stop dropped the Commodore to third place behind the factory Nissan Skyline DR30s of George Fury and Glenn Seton and Gary Scott and Terry Shiel. Despite the setback, the team's pace confirmed that the Chickadee Commodore had developed into a realistic challenger to the established factory-backed operations heading into Bathurst.

Arriving at the 1986 James Hardie 1000, the Chickadee Commodore immediately demonstrated its pace. Grice qualified on the front row after recording the second-fastest time behind Gary Scott, despite setting his fastest lap on the harder Yokohama race tyres rather than softer qualifying tyres.

Grice dominated the opening hours of the race, building a commanding lead over Peter Brock and the other factory-backed entries before handing over to Bailey shortly before half distance for his scheduled 26-lap stint. On the final lap of that stint, Bailey—who had been experiencing intermittent problems with the team's radio communications—braked too late entering Hell Corner and spun onto the escape road. The Commodore escaped without damage and Bailey rejoined before bringing the car straight into the pits for the scheduled driver change.

It was at this point that the team addressed the only mechanical issue encountered throughout the entire Bathurst weekend—a leaking differential pinion seal. As a precaution, Pattenden crawled beneath the Commodore and topped up the differential oil before Grice's concluding stint. The additional time in pit lane cost the team its commanding lead, with Grice rejoining the race just ahead of John Harvey's Holden Commodore.

As the race entered its closing stages, Bailey considered returning to the cockpit for the run to the finish but ultimately decided to leave Grice in the car, believing Grice offered the team's best chance of victory. Grice remained at the wheel to secure his long-awaited first Bathurst victory, while Bailey claimed his only outright win in Australia's premier endurance race. The pair finished ahead of the Holden Commodore shared by John Harvey and Neal Lowe and the Nissan Skyline of Gary Scott and Terry Shiel.

The victory represented the culmination of more than a decade of Bailey's progression from class competitor to outright Bathurst winner. Contemporary accounts emphasised the collaborative nature of the Chickadee operation, with Bailey funding and assembling the programme, Pattenden preparing the Commodore during the Australian Touring Car Championship season, Small directing its engineering development for the endurance races, and Grice contributing the experience of one of Australia's leading touring car professionals. Together they produced one of the defining privateer achievements of the Group A era.

== Later career ==
Following his Bathurst victory, Bailey made one further appearance in the Bathurst-winning Commodore during the support races for the 1986 Australian Grand Prix in Adelaide. Although he remained active in motorsport, he elected not to pursue another full-scale national touring car campaign, instead concentrating on the continued growth of Chickadee Foods.

Bailey later returned to competition for a one-off appearance in the Winton 300, sharing a Toyota Supra with fellow Central Coast driver John Bourke. He subsequently embarked on the construction of a Chevrolet-powered Nissan 300ZX Sports Sedan, a long-term project that occupied several years before the car was completed. After testing the Sports Sedan at Oran Park, Bailey concluded that his enthusiasm for serious competition had diminished. The car was later raced in New South Wales Sports Sedan competition by his son before being sold.

Reflecting on his decision to retire, Bailey said the Sports Sedan project reminded him of the demands competitive motor racing placed on both his family and business. Having achieved his ambition of winning the Bathurst 1000, he decided there was little left for him to accomplish in Australian motorsport and chose to devote his attention to family life and the continued expansion of Chickadee Foods.

Under Bailey's leadership, Chickadee Foods grew into one of Australia's leading poultry food manufacturers, supplying cooked chicken products to major national fast-food chains including McDonald's, Red Rooster, Hungry Jack's and Subway, in addition to food-service distributors throughout Australia. The business was sold to Inghams Enterprises in 2004.

== Legacy ==
Although Bailey contested relatively few Australian Touring Car Championship events compared with many of his contemporaries, he established a reputation as one of Australia's leading privateer touring car competitors during the late 1970s and 1980s. His progression from class victories in Toyota Celicas to outright victory in the 1986 James Hardie 1000 demonstrated that an independently funded operation could successfully challenge factory-backed teams during the Group A era.

The significance of Bailey's achievements has continued to be recognised within Australian motorsport. In 2018, Erebus Motorsport paid tribute to Bailey's 1986 Bathurst-winning Chickadee Racing Holden Commodore and his earlier Toyota Celica with retro liveries for the Sandown 500. At the launch, David Reynolds compared Bailey's 1986 Bathurst victory with Erebus Motorsport's own 2017 Bathurst success, describing both as victories achieved by privately backed teams against better-funded factory opposition.

The Bathurst-winning Chickadee Holden VK Commodore continues to appear at historic motorsport events and remains one of the most popular privately entered touring cars of the Group A era.

== Racing record ==
=== Career summary ===
Season	Series	Position	Car	Team
1980	Australian Touring Car Championship	24th	Toyota Celica	Chickadee Chicken
1981	Australian Touring Car Championship; Better Brakes 3.5 Litre Series	9th 5th	Toyota Celica	Chickadee Chicken
1982	Australian Touring Car Championship; Australian Endurance Championship	28th 14th	Toyota Celica	Chickadee Chicken
1983	Australian Endurance Championship	10th	Mazda RX-7	Peter McLeod
1986	Australian Touring Car Championship; Australian Endurance Championship	13th 10th	Holden VK Commodore SS Group A	Chickadee Racing

=== Complete Australian Touring Car Championship results ===
Year	Team	Car	1	2	3	4	5	6	7	8	9	10	DC	Points
1980	Chickadee Chicken	Toyota Celica	SYM	CAL	LAK	SAN	WAN	SUR	AIR	ORA; 7			24th	3
1981	Chickadee Chicken	Toyota Celica	SYM	CAL	ORA; 6	SAN	WAN	AIR; 10	SUR	LAK; 4			9th	15
1982	Chickadee Chicken	Toyota Celica	SAN	CAL	SYM	ORA; 11	LAK	WAN	AIR	SUR			28th	4
1986	Chickadee Racing	Holden VK Commodore SS Group A	AMA; Ret	SYM	SAN	AIR	WAN	SUR; 7	CAL; 9	LAK; 6	WIN	ORA; 4	13th	50

=== Complete European Touring Car Championship results ===
Year	Team	Car	1	2	3	4	5	6	7	8	9	10	11	12	13	14	DC	Points
1986	Australian National Motor Racing Team	Holden VK Commodore SS Group A	MNZ; Ret	DON; Ret	HOC; Ret	MIS	AND	BNO	OST	NUR	SPA	SIL	NOG	ZOL	JAR	EST	NC	0

=== Complete Bathurst 1000 results ===
Year	Team	Co-drivers	Car	Class	Laps	Pos.	Class pos.
1979	Brian Hilton Toyota	Doug Clark	Toyota Celica	C	46	DNF	DNF
1980	Chickadee Chicken	Doug Clark	Toyota Celica	1601–2000cc	148	12th	1st
1981	Chickadee Chicken	Steve Land	Toyota Celica	4 Cylinder	34	DNF	DNF
1982	Chickadee Chicken	Steve Land	Toyota Celica	B	65	DNF	DNF
1983	Petrolon Slick 50	Peter McLeod	Mazda RX-7	A	158	5th	5th
1984	Petrolon Slick 50	Peter McLeod	Mazda RX-7	Group C	39	DNF	DNF
1985	I.M.B. Team Wollongong	Peter McLeod	Holden Commodore (VK)	C	126	DNF	DNF
1986	Chickadee Chicken	Allan Grice	Holden VK Commodore SS Group A	C	163	1st	1st

Class victories: 1980 (1601–2000cc) Outright victories: 1986

=== Complete Sandown results ===
Year	Team	Co-drivers	Car	Class	Laps	Pos.	Class pos.
1979	Brian Hilton Toyota	drove solo	Toyota Celica	C	113	8th	1st
1980	Chickadee Chicken	Doug Clark	Toyota Celica	C	NA	23rd	7th
1981	Chickadee Chicken	Steve Land	Toyota Celica	C	NA	DNF	DNF
1982	Chickadee Chicken	Steve Land	Toyota Celica	B	98	18th	1st
1984	Slick 50	Peter McLeod	Mazda RX-7	Over 3000cc	57	DNF	DNF
1986	Roadways Racing	Allan Grice	Holden VK Commodore SS Group A	B	128	3rd	3rd

== Bibliography ==
- Tuckey, Bill (1987). James Hardie 1000, 1986/87. Vol. 6. Gordon, N.S.W.: Berghouse Floyd Tuckey Publishing Group. ISSN 0811-546X.
- West, Luke (September–October 2011). "Poultry in Motion". Australian Muscle Car. No. 57. Chevron Publishing Group. pp. 38–64. ISSN 1446-5647.

Sporting positions
Preceded by John Goss; Armin Hahne	Bathurst 1000 winner 1986; With: Allan Grice	Succeeded by Peter Brock; Peter McLeod; David Parsons
