= Holden Commodore (VC) =

Australian mid-size car

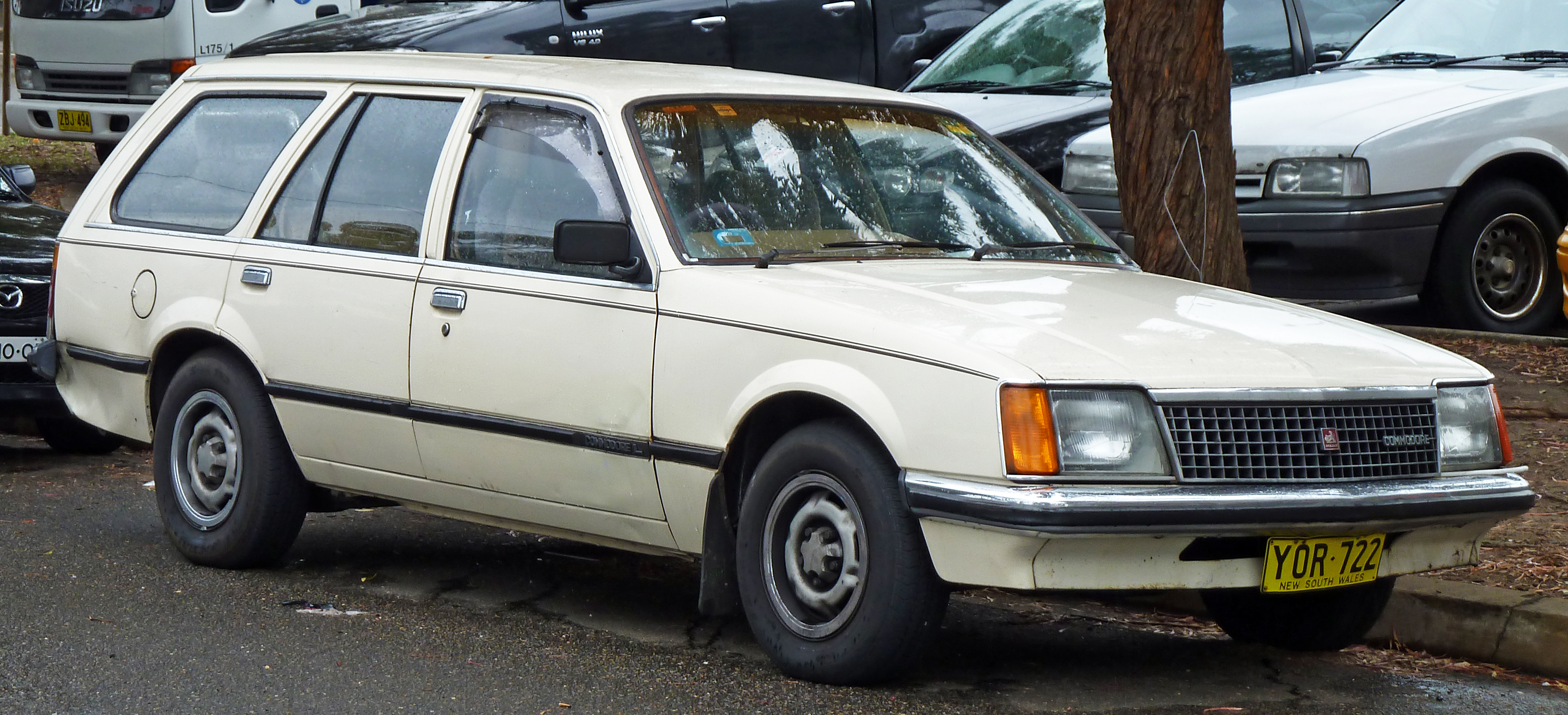
- 1980 Commodore (VC) L wagon

Overview
- Manufacturer: Holden (General Motors)
- Production: March 1980 – October 1981
- Assembly: Australia: Adelaide, South Australia (Elizabeth), Melbourne, Victoria (Dandenong), Brisbane, Queensland (Acacia Ridge); New Zealand: Wellington (Trentham); Indonesia (CKD)
- Designer: Leo Pruneau

Body and chassis
- Class: Mid-size
- Body style: 4-door sedan 5-door station wagon
- Layout: Front engine, rear-wheel-drive layout
- Platform: GM V platform
- Related: Opel Rekord E Opel Senator; Vauxhall Carlton

Powertrain
- Engine: 1.9 L 58 kW (78 hp) Starfire I4; 2.85 L 76 kW (102 hp) Blue I6; 3.3 L 83 kW (111 hp) Blue I6; 4.2 L 100 kW (134 hp) Blue V8; 4.2 L 115 kW (154 hp) Blue V8 (dual exhaust); 5.0 L 115 kW (154 hp) Blue V8; 5.0 L 126 kW (169 hp) Blue V8 (dual exhaust)
- Transmission: 4-speed manual 3-speed automatic

Dimensions
- Wheelbase: 2,668 mm (105.0 in)
- Length: 4,706–4,730 mm (185.3–186.2 in)
- Width: 1,722–1,736 mm (67.8–68.3 in)
- Height: 1,379–1,375 mm (54.3–54.1 in)
- Kerb weight: 1,158–1,348 kg (2,553–2,972 lb)

Chronology
- Predecessor: Holden Commodore (VB)
- Successor: Holden Commodore (VH)

The Holden Commodore (VC) is a mid-size car that was produced by Holden, from 1980 to 1981. It was the second iteration of the first generation of the Holden Commodore.

== Overview ==
The VC Commodore was launched on 30 March 1980 and is primarily distinguished by its "eggcrate" style grille. This series brought many improvements over the VB Commodore. It was the best selling car of 1980. It was replaced by the VH series in October 1981.

The improvements included revised suspension to improve ride and handling, a few cosmetic changes and the availability of new options such as cruise control.

The VC Commodore was complemented by a range of Holden WB commercial vehicles and Statesman luxury models.

== Powertrains ==
One of the biggest changes were a series of engine upgrades which included redesigned cylinder heads, now with a single intake and exhaust port for every cylinder, improved intake/exhaust manifolds, new camshafts and pistons and an all-new carburettor called the Rochester Varajet, as well as the fitment of electronic ignition. In total, these upgrades brought up to 25 percent more power and 15 percent better fuel efficiency. The engine block on these motors were painted a blue colour (as opposed to the previous red) and were commonly referred to as the Blue motor.

As well as the changes to the existing engines, a new 1.9-litre inline-four engine was introduced in mid-1980. Known as the Starfire four, the new engine was the 2.85-litre blue inline-six engine with two cylinders removed. Also used in the UC Sunbird, this engine was fitted to the Commodore in response to increasing pressure from the 1979 energy crisis. The Starfire was criticised for its lack of power, needing to be pushed hard to deliver acceptable performance, negating any fuel saving benefits.

Powertrains
Eng. disp.; configuration	Engine	Power	Torque	Transmission
1.9 L; I4	Starfire	58 kW (78 hp)	140 N⋅m (103 lb⋅ft)	4-speed manual 3-speed automatic
2.85 L; I6	Holden straight-six motor (Blue)	76 kW (102 hp)	192 N⋅m (142 lb⋅ft)	4-speed manual 3-speed automatic
3.3 L; I6	Holden straight-six motor (Blue)	83 kW (111 hp)	231 N⋅m (170 lb⋅ft)	4-speed manual 3-speed automatic
4.2 L; V8 (single exhaust)	Holden V8 engine (Blue)	100 kW (134 hp)	269 N⋅m (198 lb⋅ft)	4-speed manual 3-speed automatic
4.2 L; V8 (dual exhaust)	Holden V8 engine (Blue)	115 kW (154 hp)	289 N⋅m (213 lb⋅ft)	4-speed manual 3-speed automatic
5.0 L; V8 (single exhaust)	Holden V8 engine (Blue)	115 kW (154 hp)	289 N⋅m (213 lb⋅ft)	4-speed manual 3-speed automatic
5.0 L; V8 (dual exhaust)	Holden V8 engine (Blue)	126 kW (169 hp)	361 N⋅m (266 lb⋅ft)	4-speed manual 3-speed automatic

== Models ==
=== Commodore L ===
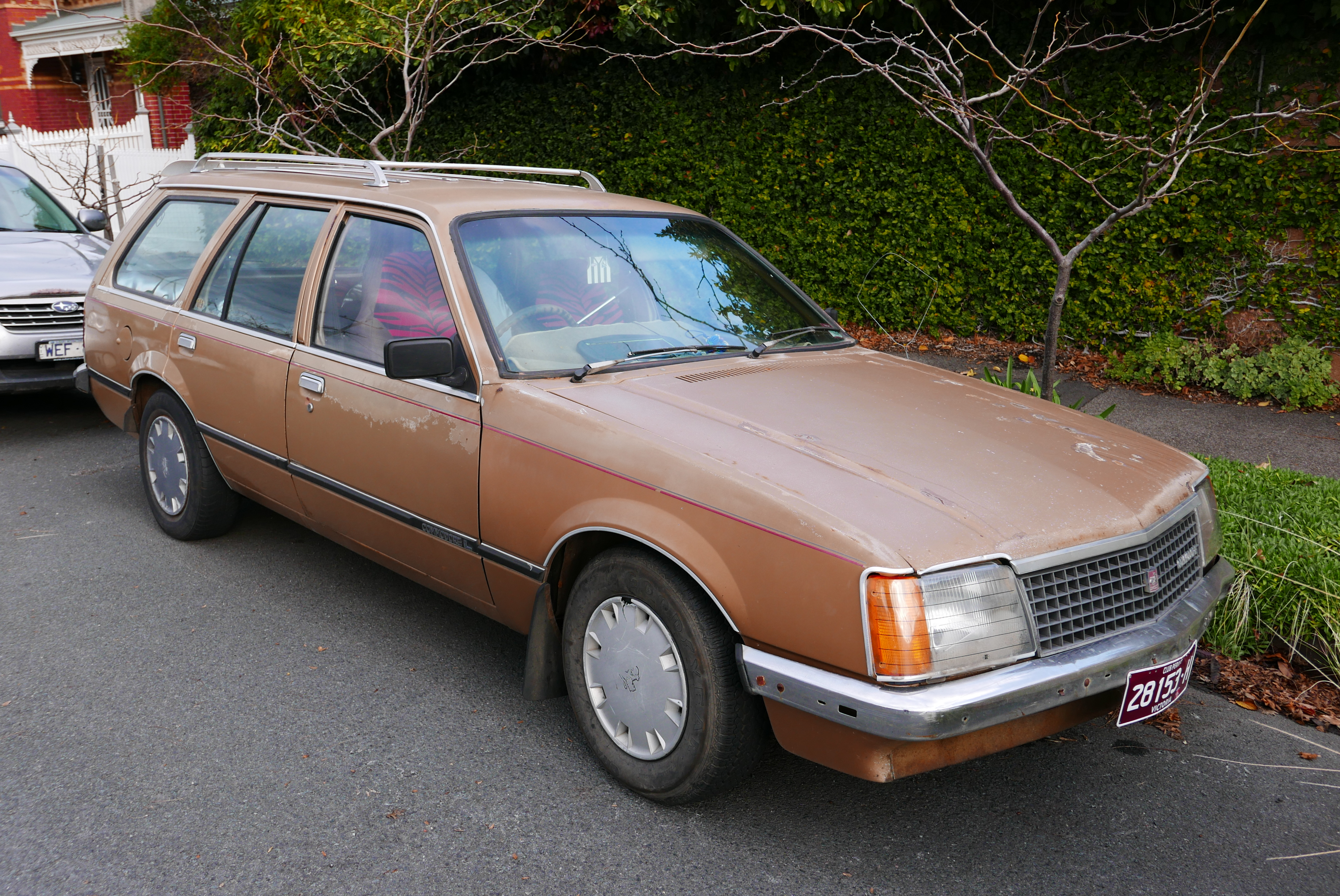
Commodore L wagon

The L was the base model, replacing the plain "Commodore" from the VB. It came standard with the 2.8-litre inline-six and manual transmission. During the production run, an option for the 1.9-litre Starfire was added; the four came with 13-inch wheels.

=== Commodore SL ===
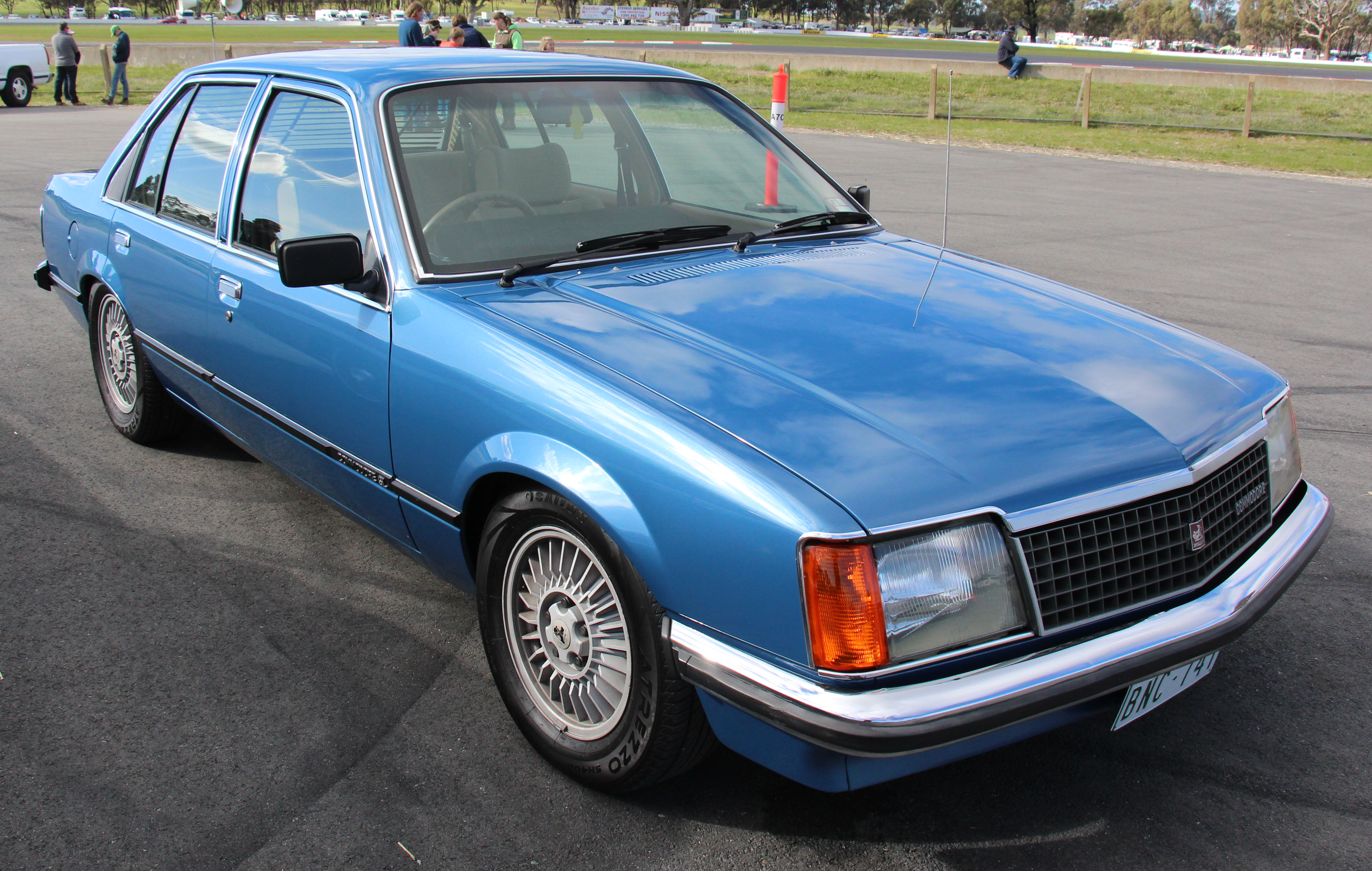
Commodore SL sedan

The SL was the mid-range model. It came standard with the 3.3-litre I6 and automatic transmission. It had an option for the 1.9-litre Starfire I4, which came with 13-inch wheels.

=== Commodore SL/E ===
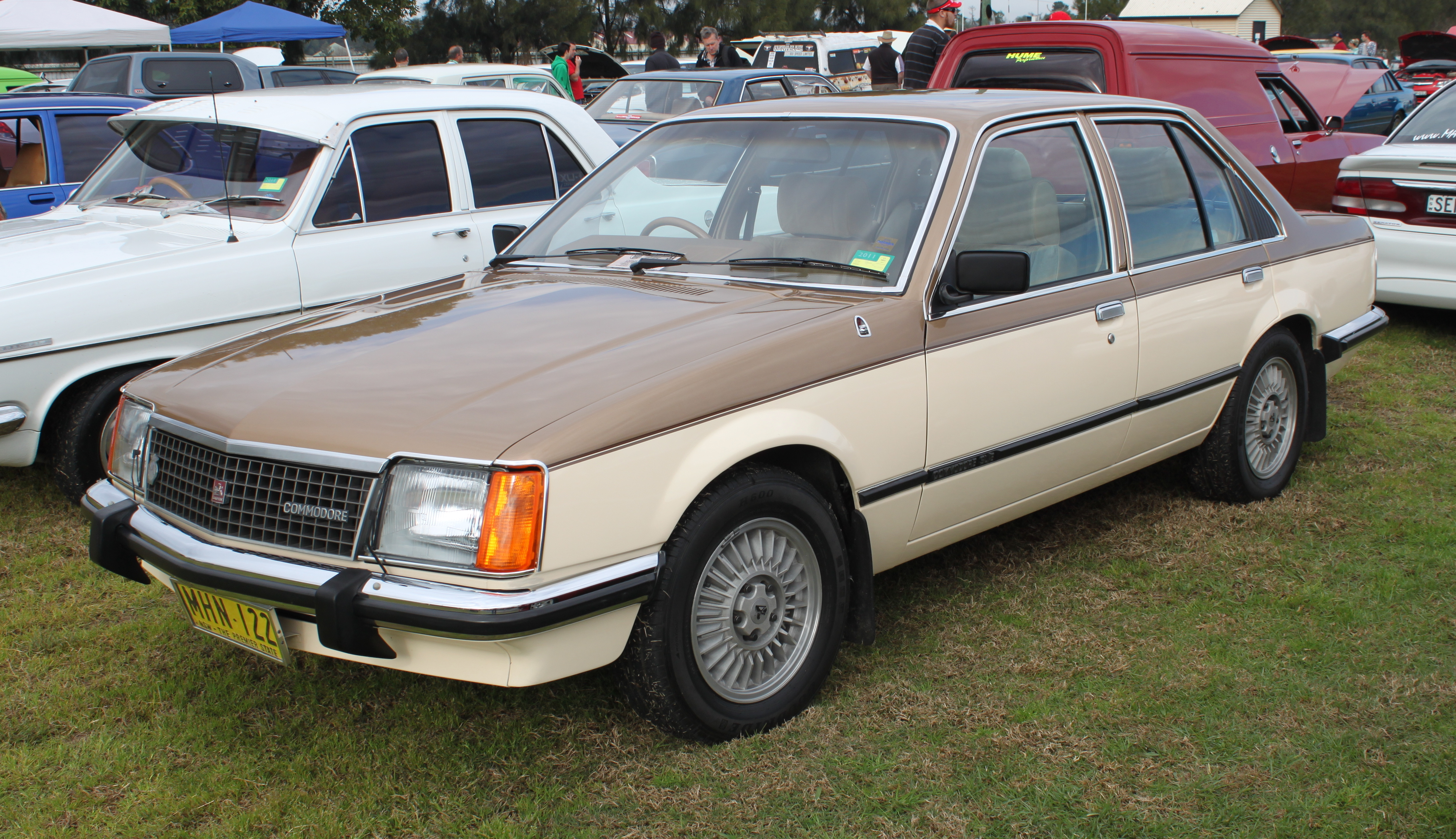
Commodore SL/E sedan

The SL/E was the flagship luxury model. It came standard with the 3.3-litre I6 and automatic transmission.

== Production ==
The VC Commodore was manufactured at the Elizabeth, Dandenong, and Acacia Ridge plants in Australia, Trentham in New Zealand and in Indonesia as knock-down kits by Udatin.

A total of 121,807 VC Commodore units were produced.

== HDT Commodore ==
In late 1979, Holden pulled out of touring car racing after two years of domination by the LX Torana. This led to Peter Brock buying the Holden Dealer Team (HDT) in 1980, though without Holden funding was needed to continue racing and development. This led to the establishment of HDT Special Vehicles, who developed a tuned and styled version of the VC Commodore – not only to produce competition versions but as a way of funding the race team. The result was a luxury-performance version of the VC Commodore, to be sold through select Holden dealers throughout Australia as the HDT Commodore. The HDT Commodore was powered by an HDT tuned 5.0-litre V8 engine producing 160 kW (215 hp) at 4500 rpm. A limited edition of 500 vehicles were produced. They sold in a choice of three colours (Palais White, Firethorn Red or Tuxedo Black), to pay homage to Marlboro, HDT's main sponsor at the time.

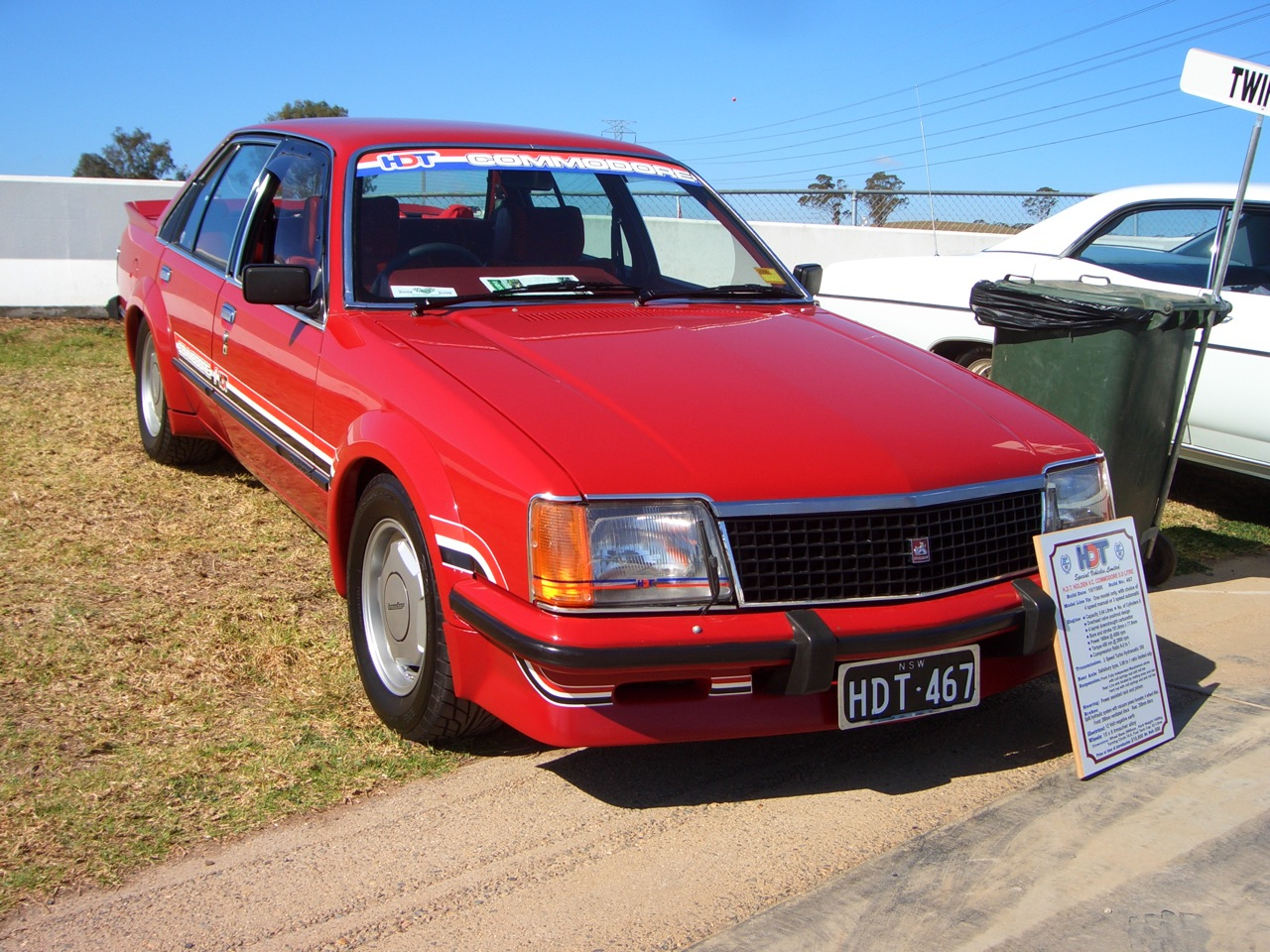
HDT Commodore exterior

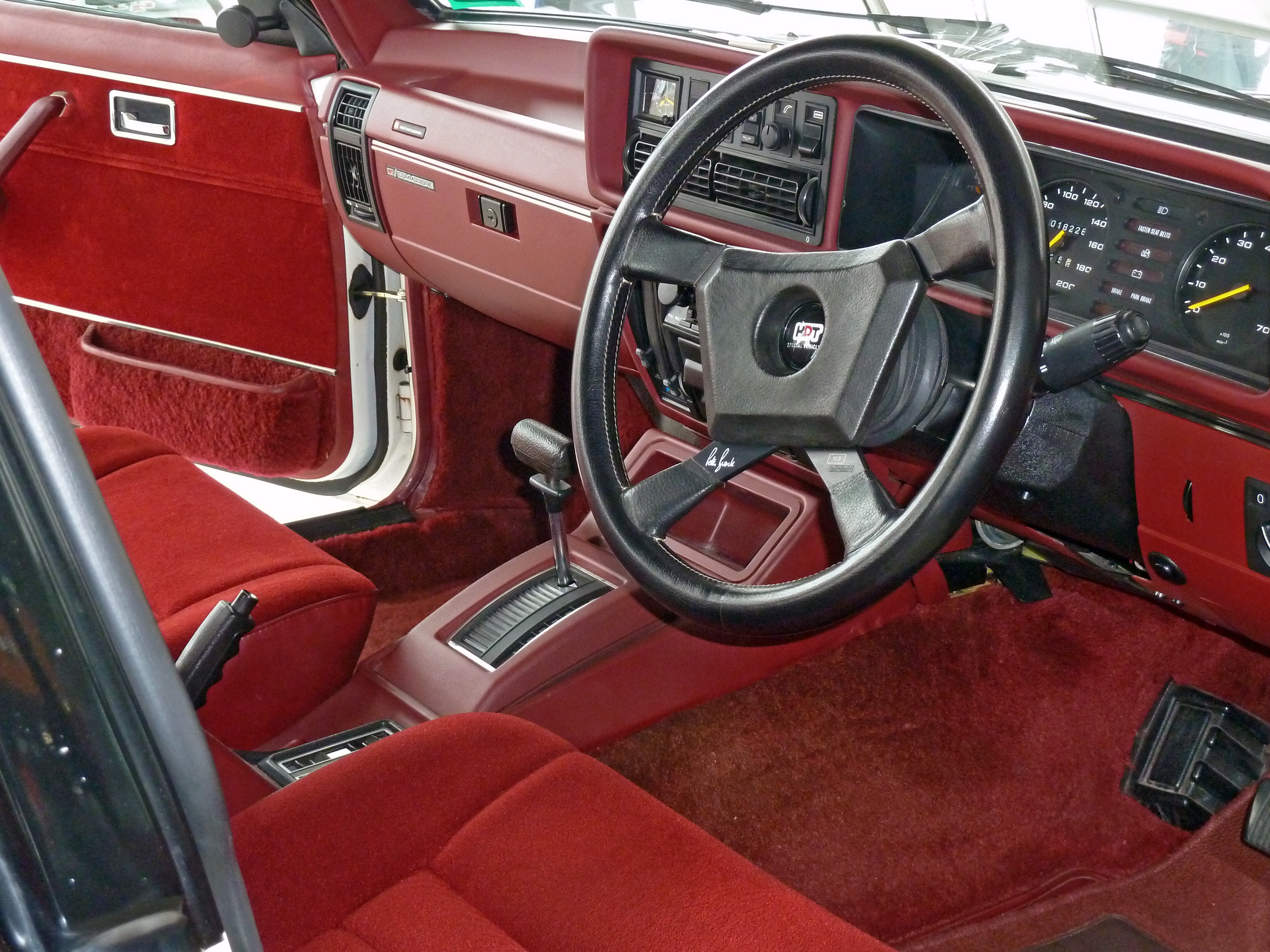
HDT Commodore interior
