= 1980 Hardie-Ferodo 1000 =

Motor race in Australia

Seasons
- ← 1979 1981 →

Layout of the Mount Panorama Circuit (1938-1986)

The 1980 Hardie-Ferodo 1000 was the 21st running of the Bathurst 1000 touring car race. It was held on 5 October 1980 at the Mount Panorama Circuit just outside Bathurst in New South Wales, Australia. The race was open to cars eligible under the locally developed CAMS Group C Touring Car regulations with four engine capacity based classes.

Peter Brock and Jim Richards won their third consecutive Bathurst 1000 debuting the Holden Commodore for the Holden Dealer Team. In taking a one lap win over Peter Janson and Larry Perkins, Brock won his fifth Bathurst 1000, breaking the record for most wins in the history of the race. Janson and Perkins finished second for the second successive year and finished three laps ahead of Ian Geoghegan and Paul Gulson as Commodores filled the first seven positions.

The race is most famous for the retirement of the Ford Falcon of Dick Johnson on lap 17. The 1980 Australian Touring Car Championship had featured one of the smallest fields in its then twelve years as a multi-race championship. The championship was dominated by Brock, with only two or three other cars competitive, including the Chevrolet Camaro Z28 of Kevin Bartlett. The emergence of hard charging Ford privateer Johnson into a race winning threat just one month prior to Bathurst at Amaroo Park's CRC 300 where he qualified on the front row with Brock and even led him for a number of laps before his tyres went off, revitalised interest (and pleased Peter Brock the most. Now the owner of the HDT, Brock knew the value of having a competitive Ford opponent and Johnson provided that). Interest was up even more so when Johnson qualified on the front row of the grid, alongside the pole-setting Camaro of Bartlett, and ahead of Brock. Johnson ran away from the field at the start and Brock dropped a lap behind Johnson after a clash with a back-marker Holden Gemini. Less than 30 seconds after lapping Brock going up Mountain Straight, Johnson crashed heavily into the wall just after the Cutting on lap 17 after clipping a large rock (which Johnson later described as being at least the size of an overnight bag) on the track when presented with no other options as a slow-moving tow truck carrying a dead-car blocked the other side of the track.

During an interview on Channel 7 with visiting pit reporter Chris Economaki, a distraught Johnson stated he had dedicated all of his finances in a final shot at the winning the race after ten years as a competent mid-fielder. Mike Raymond then interrupted the interview from the commentary booth to inform a visibly moved Johnson that their switchboards around the country were flooded with calls from people pledging money to get Johnson and his Ford back racing with a total of AU$ 72,000 raised. This total was matched dollar for dollar by the then boss of Ford Australia, Edsel Ford II, who quickly saw the value of having Johnson keeping Ford at the front of touring car racing despite the company having pulled out of racing at the end of 1978. Johnson would go on to repay the faith shown in him by Edsel Ford and the Australian public, using the $144,000 he received (along with the proceeds of selling the 1980 Bathurst car to fellow Queensland based racer John Donnelly) to build a new Falcon in which he would go on to win the 1981 ATCC and the crash shortened 1981 James Hardie 1000.

The 1980 win by the HDT Commodore saw Holden become the first manufacturer since Ford in 1963, 1964 and 1965 to win three consecutive races on The Mountain.

== Class structure ==
=== 3001-6000cc ===
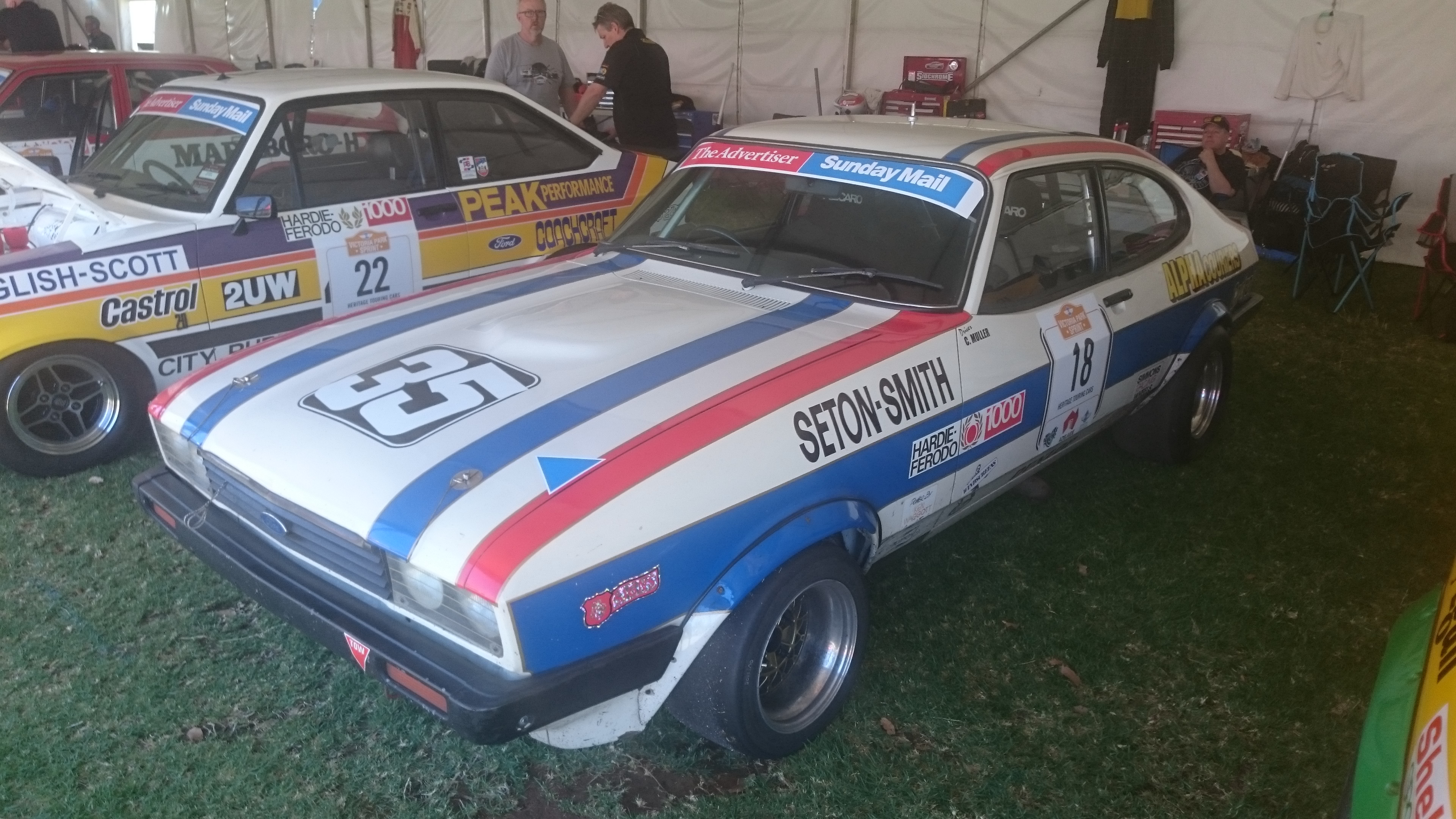
Seton/Smith Ford Capri, winner of the 2000-3000cc class (image from 2017)

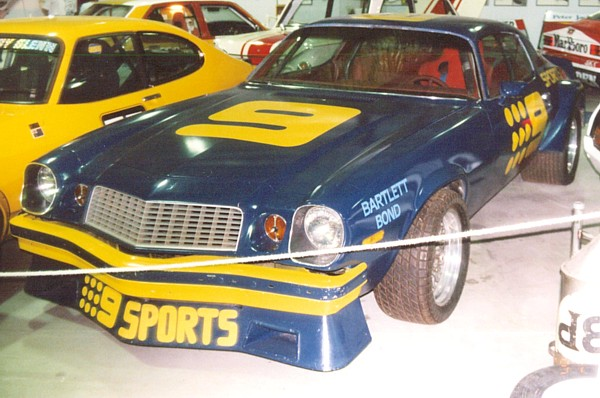
Bartlett/Forbes Chevrolet Camaro

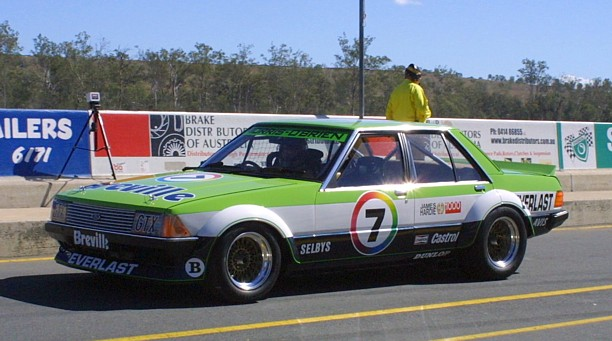
Morris/O'Brien/Moffat Ford XD Falcon

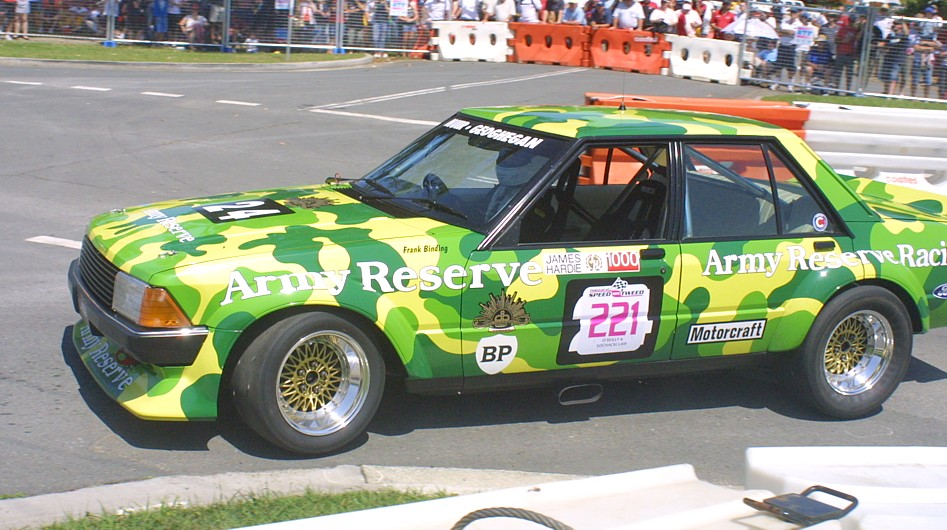
Muir/Hibbard Ford XD Falcon

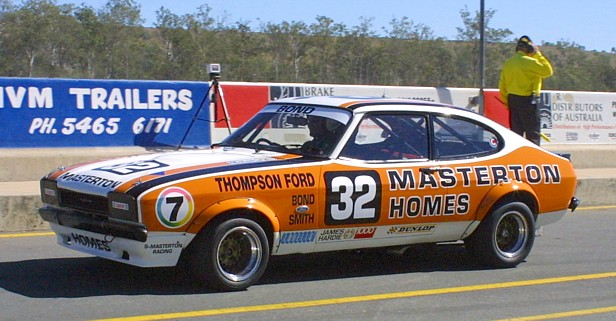
Bond/Masterton Ford Capri

The class featured a battle between:

- 8 Ford XD Falcons (with V8 motor)
- 3 Chevrolet Z28 Camaros (with V8 motor)
- 4 Holden VB Commodores (with V8 motor) +
- 9 Holden VC Commodores (with V8 motor) +
- 1 Jaguar XJ-S (with V12 motor) +.

+ Holden Commodore was racing at Bathurst for the first time
+ Jaguar XJ-S was racing at Bathurst for the first time

=== 2001-3000cc ===
The class featured a battle between:

- 5 Ford Capris: (with V6 motor)
- 3 Mazda RX-7s: (with rotary motor)
- 1 Holden VB Commodore. (with I6 motor) +

+ Holden Commodore was racing at Bathurst for the first time

=== 1601-2000cc ===
The class featured a battle between:

- 2 Alfa Romeo Alfettas (with I4 motor)
- 2 Ford Escort 1.6Ls (with I4 motor)
- 6 Ford Escort RS2000s (with I4 motor)
- 1 Isuzu Gemini ZZ/L coupe (with I4 motor)
- 2 Triumph Dolomites (with I4 motor)
- 3 Toyota Celicas (with I4 motor)
- 1 Toyota Corollas. (with I4 motor)

=== Up to 1600cc ===
The final class featured a battle between:

- 1 Alfa Romeo Alfasud Ti1.5 (with I4 motor)
- 2 Ford Escort 1.6GLs (with I4 motor)
- 1 Holden Gemini TE (with I4 motor)
- 5 Isuzu Gemini ZZ/L sedans (with I4 motor)
- 1 Mitsubishi Lancer (with I4 motor)
- 1 Toyota Corolla (with I4 motor)
- 1 Volkswagen Golf GTi. (with I4 motor)

== Hardies Heroes ==
Pos	No	Entrant	Driver	Car	Time
Pole	9	Nine Network Racing Team	(Australia) Kevin Bartlett	Chevrolet Camaro Z28	2:20.972
2	17	Palmer Tube Mills	(Australia) Dick Johnson	Ford XD Falcon	2:21.117
3	05	Marlboro Holden Dealer Team	(Australia) Peter Brock	Holden VC Commodore	2:21.815
4	25	Marlboro Holden Dealer Team	(Australia) John Harvey	Holden VC Commodore	2:23.005
5	6	Craven Mild Racing	(Australia) Allan Grice	Holden VC Commodore	2:23.650
6	7	Channel 7 Breville Racing	(Australia) Bob Morris	Ford XD Falcon	2:23.850
7	10	Roadways Gown-Hindhaugh	(Australia) Charlie O'Brien	Holden VC Commodore	2:24.038
8	4	Cadbury Schweppes Pty Ltd	(Australia) Larry Perkins	Holden VC Commodore	2:25.505
9	1	Federation Insurance - Unipart	(Canada) Allan Moffat	Ford XD Falcon	2:26.596
10	16	Greater Pacific Finance Coy	(Australia) Garry Rogers	Holden VC Commodore	2:27.452

- This was the first touring car race in which he competed during 1980 where Peter Brock's #05 HDT Commodore did not claim pole position. Brock had claimed pole in his previous 12 races during the year including all 8 rounds of the ATCC and the Hang Ten 400 at Sandown.
- It was the first time that the 5.7 L V8 Chevrolet Camaro, an American car, had sat on pole for the race. The Camaro was also the first non-Holden or Ford to compete in Hardie's Heroes since its inception in 1978. During qualifying Kevin Bartlett's Camaro was recorded at 170 mph (274 km/h) on Conrod Straight, a then record for a Group C touring car at Bathurst.
- 1980 was the first of only 6 times that a left hand drive (LHD) car started on pole position for the Bathurst 1000. The others were when Bartlett repeated as pole winner in the Camaro in 1981, 1987 when West German multiple 24 Hours of Le Mans winner Klaus Ludwig put his Ford Sierra RS500 on pole, 1990 when German driver Klaus Niedzwiedz put Allan Moffat's European build Ford Sierra RS500 on pole, while both Super Touring Bathurst 1000's in 1997 (BMW 320i) and 1998 (Volvo S40) saw LHD cars on pole position.
- 1974 winner Kevin Bartlett, and emerging star Dick Johnson, had set equal fastest times during qualifying, though Bartlett set his time before Johnson and was credited with provisional pole. The pair would repeat this in 1981.

== Results ==
Pos	Class	No	Entrant	Drivers	Car	Laps	Time/Retired	Qualifying Pos
1	3001-6000cc	05	Holden Dealer Team	(Australia) Peter Brock (New Zealand) Jim Richards	Holden VC Commodore	163		3
2	3001-6000cc	4	Cadbury Schweppes Pty Ltd	(New Zealand) Peter Janson (Australia) Larry Perkins	Holden VC Commodore	162	+1 lap	8
3	3001-6000cc	21	Stockton Coin & Bullion Exchange Pty Ltd	(Australia) Ian Geoghegan (Australia) Paul Gulson	Holden VB Commodore	159	+4 laps	13
4	3001-6000cc	15	Re-Car Consolidated Industries	(Australia) Alan Browne (Australia) Brian Sampson	Holden VC Commodore	158	+5 laps	15
5	3001-6000cc	10	Roadways Racing	(Australia) Charlie O'Brien (Australia) Garth Wigston	Holden VC Commodore	157	+6 laps	7
6	3001-6000cc	16	Greater Pacific Finance Coy	(Australia) Garry Rogers (Australia) Fred Giessler	Holden VC Commodore	157	+6 laps	10
7	3001-6000cc	6	Craven Mild Racing	(Australia) Allan Grice (Australia) John Smith	Holden VC Commodore	156	+7 laps	5
8	2001-3000cc	35	Don Smith	(Australia) Barry Seton (Australia) Don Smith	Ford Capri Mk.III	156	+7 laps	22
9	3001-6000cc	26	Re-Car Consolidated Industries	(Australia) Ron Wanless (Australia) Greg Wright	Holden VC Commodore	154	+9 laps	26
10	3001-6000cc	14	Wayne Negus	(Australia) Wayne Negus (Australia) Trevor Hine	Holden VC Commodore	153	+10 laps	19
11	3001-6000cc	9	Nine Network Racing Team	(Australia) Kevin Bartlett (Australia) Bob Forbes	Chevrolet Camaro Z28	152	+11 laps	1
12	1601-2000cc	51	Chickadee Chicken	(Australia) Graeme Bailey (Australia) Doug Clark	Toyota Celica	148	+15 laps	30
13	2001-3000cc	32	Masterton Homes	(Australia) Steve Masterton (Australia) Colin Bond	Ford Capri Mk.II	147	+16 laps	16
14	1601-2000cc	45	Graham Mein	(Australia) Graham Mein (Australia) Geoff Russell	Ford Escort RS2000 Mk.II	142	+21 laps	41
15	Up to 1600cc	54	Terry Finnigan Racing Team	(Australia) Terry Finnigan (Australia) Peter Dane	Isuzu Gemini ZZ/L sedan	140	+23 laps	46
16	Up to 1600cc	57	Scottune	(Australia) Ian Burrell (Australia) Rob Shute	Mitsubishi Lancer	139	+24 laps	45
17	2001-3000cc	37	Trend Windows P/L	(Australia) Terry Daly (Australia) Peter Hopwood	Ford Capri Mk.II	138	+25 laps	24
18	3001-6000cc	2	Ron Dickson	(Australia) Ron Dickson (Australia) Bob Stevens	Chevrolet Camaro Z28	138	+25 laps	12
19	1601-2000cc	40	Rex Monaghan	(Australia) Ray Cutchie (Australia) Ray Farrar	Ford Escort RS2000 Mk.II	135	+28 laps	32
20	Up to 1600cc	65	Formula Ford Australia	(Australia) Bob Holden (Australia) David Earle	Ford Escort Ghia 1.6	135	+28 laps	51
21	1601-2000cc	42	Warwick Henderson	(Australia) Warwick Henderson (Australia) Graham Harrison	Alfa Romeo Alfetta GTV 2000	135	+28 laps	44
22	3001-6000cc	19	Tom Heard	(Australia) Neville Bridges (Australia) Sue Ransom	Holden VB Commodore	134	+29 laps	40
23	Up to 1600cc	64	Ray Gulson	(Australia) Ray Gulson (Australia) Paul Jones	Alfa Romeo Alfasud Ti	134	+29 laps	51
24	1601-2000cc	52	B&G Meyers Leyland	(Australia) Terry Wade (Australia) Brian Reed	Triumph Dolomite Sprint	131	+32 laps	37
25	Up to 1600cc	58	Bernie McLure	(Australia) Bernie McClure (Australia) David Langman	Holden Gemini TE sedan	130	+33 laps	53
26	1601-2000cc	43	Allbrells Auto Care Centres	(New Zealand) John Faulkner (Australia) Gary Dumbrell	Ford Escort RS2000 Mk.II	129	+34 laps	36
27	2001-3000cc	34	Scotty Taylor Holden	(Australia) Alan Taylor (Australia) Kevin Kennedy	Holden VB Commodore	128	+35 laps	48
28	1601-2000cc	62	Alexandra Surplice	(Australia) Alexandra Surplice (Australia) John Gates	Toyota Corolla Levin	127	+36 laps	57
29	Up to 1600cc	61	Ken Harrison	(Australia) Ken Harrison (Australia) Ian Wells	Ford Escort 1.6 Mk.II	126	+37 laps	55
30	2001-3000cc	29	Capri Components	(Australia) Lawrie Nelson (Australia) Tony Farrell	Ford Capri Mk.III	121	+42 laps	29
31	1601-2000cc	53	Bathurst Light Car Club	(Australia) Tony Mulvihill (Australia) Brian Nightingale	Ford Escort RS2000 Mk.II	120	+43 laps	56
32	2001-3000cc	31	Masterton Homes	(Australia) Bruce Stewart (Australia) Cam Worner	Ford Capri Mk.II	120	+43 laps	28
33	Up to 1600cc	55	CARS Gemini Racing Team	(Australia) Ken Price (Australia) Steve Jonas	Isuzu Gemini ZZ/L sedan	116	+47 laps	50
34	Up to 1600cc	56	CARS Gemini Racing Team	(Australia) Allan Gough (Australia) Colin Spencer	Isuzu Gemini ZZ/L sedan	111	+53 laps	43
DNF	3001-6000cc	11	Citizens Watches (Aust) Pty Ltd	(Australia) Gary Cooke (Australia) Warwick Brown	Holden VB Commodore	155		11
DNF	1601-2000cc	44	Peter Williamson Pty Ltd	(Australia) Peter Williamson (Australia) Mike Quinn	Toyota Celica	129	Alternator	27
DNF	1601-2000cc	49	Jagparts Racing Team	(Australia) Gerald Kay (Australia) Martin Power	Triumph Dolomite Sprint	116		39
DNF	1601-2000cc	41	Roger Cartwright	(Australia) Roger Cartwright (Australia) Rod Stevens	Ford Escort RS2000 Mk.II	112		31
DNF	Up to 1600cc	60	Country Dealer Team	(Australia) Jim Faneco (Australia) Peter Boston	Isuzu Gemini ZZ/L sedan	111	Rollover	52
NC	3001-6000cc	18	Murray Carter	(Australia) Murray Carter (New Zealand) Graeme Lawrence	Ford XD Falcon	106		14
NC	2001-3000cc	39	Darrell Lea Chocolate Shops Lty Ltd	(Australia) Barry Jones (Australia) Geoff Leeds	Mazda RX-7	105		25
DNF	3001-6000cc	12	Ron Dickson	(United States) Dick Barbour (United States) Sam Posey	Chevrolet Camaro Z28	91		18
DNF	3001-6000cc	7	Ron Hodgson Motors	(Australia) Bill O'Brien (Australia) Bob Morris (Canada) Allan Moffat	Ford XD Falcon	88	Engine	6
DNF	3001-6000cc	25	Holden Dealer Team	(Australia) John Harvey (Australia) Ron Harrop	Holden VC Commodore	78	Engine	4
DNF	2001-3000cc	30	McLeod Mazda	(Australia) Peter McLeod (Australia) Mal Brewster	Mazda RX-7	65		33
DNF	Up to 1600cc	63	Lennox Motors	(Australia) Chris Heyer (Australia) Peter Lander	Volkswagen Golf GTi	63	Fire	42
DNF	3001-6000cc	20	Gibson Motorsport	(Australia) Joe Moore (Australia) Fred Gibson	Ford XD Falcon	51		20
DNF	1601-2000cc	46	Formula Ford Australia	(Australia) Stephen Brook (Australia) Wally Storey	Ford Escort RS2000 Mk.II	45		34
DNF	3001-6000cc	22	Jim Keogh	(Australia) Jim Keogh (Australia) Ross Mathiesen	Ford XD Falcon	42		21
DNF	3001-6000cc	8	Garry Willmington	(Australia) Garry Willmington (Australia) Rod Donovan	Ford XD Falcon	24		23
DNF	3001-6000cc	23	Phil Lyon	(Australia) Phil Lyon (Australia) Bill Stanley	Holden VB Commodore	23		11
DNF	2001-3000cc	28	Precinct Performance Pty Ltd	(Australia) Allan Bryant (Australia) Terry Shiel	Mazda RX-7	19		38
DNF	1601-2000cc	50	Cinzano Team	(Australia) Garry Leggatt (Australia) David Seldon	Isuzu Gemini ZZ/L coupe	18		60
DNF	3001-6000cc	17	Dick Johnson Racing	(Australia) Dick Johnson (Australia) John French	Ford XD Falcon	17	Crash	2
DNF	1601-2000cc	48	Brian Foley Pty Ltd	(Australia) Phil McDonnell (United Kingdom) Derek Bell	Alfa Romeo Alfetta GTV 2000	16		35
DNF	3001-6000cc	3	John Goss Racing	(Australia) John Goss (Australia) Ron Gillard	Jaguar XJ-S	14		58
DNF	Up to 1600cc	59	Country Dealer Team	(Australia) Gary Rowe (Australia) Geoff Wade	Isuzu Gemini ZZ/L sedan	12	Crash	49
DNF	3001-6000cc	24	Robert Muir Motors Pty Ltd	(Australia) Bob Muir (New Zealand) Kingsley Hibbard	Ford XD Falcon	7		17
DNF	3001-6000cc	1	Allan Moffat Racing	(Canada) Allan Moffat (United Kingdom) John Fitzpatrick	Ford XD Falcon	3	Engine	9
DNF	1601-2000cc	47	Wally Scott	(Australia) Walter Scott (Australia) Peter Walton	Toyota Celica	3		47

== Statistics ==
- Provisional Pole Position - #9 Kevin Bartlett
- Pole Position - #9 Kevin Bartlett - 2:20.972
- Fastest Lap - #17 Dick Johnson - 2:22.2
- Average Speed - 148 km/h
- Race Time - 6:47:52.7
