= 1981 Australian Endurance Championship =

Seasons
- ← none 1982 →

The 1981 Australian Endurance Championship was a CAMS sanctioned motor racing title for car manufacturers, contested with Group C Touring Cars. It was the 11th circuit racing manufacturers' championship title to be awarded by CAMS and the first to carry the Australian Endurance Championship name. No driver's title was awarded in connection with this championship.

Toyota were awarded the championship with a maximum possible score of 36 points, from Ford on 27, with Holden, Mazda and Mitsubishi tied for third on 24 points each. Toyota's score was attained by Graeme Bailey, with three class wins, and Peter Williamson, with one. Both drove Toyota Celicas.

== Calendar ==
The championship was contested over a four round series with each round staged as a single race of between 250 km and 500 km.

Round	Race name	Circuit	Date	Winning driver	Car	Entrant	Report
1	None	Adelaide International Raceway	26 July	(Australia) Peter Brock	Holden VC Commodore	Marlboro Holden Dealer Team	
2	Valvoline 250	Oran Park Raceway	23 August	(Australia) Dick Johnson	Ford XD Falcon	Palmer Tube Mills	
3	Hang Ten 400	Sandown Raceway	13 September	(Australia) Peter Brock	Holden VC Commodore	Marlboro Holden Dealer Team	Report
4	International Resort 300	Surfers Paradise International Raceway	1 November	(Canada) Allan Moffat	Mazda RX-7	Peter Stuyvesant Racing	

== Classes ==
Cars competed in four classes based on engine capacity.

- Class A: 3001 to 6000cc
- Class B: 2001 to 3000cc
- Class C:1601 to 2000cc
- Class D: Up to 1600cc

== Points system ==
Championship points were awarded on a 9-6-4-3-2-1 basis for the first six places in each class at each round, but only for the position attained by the best placed car of each make. No bonus points were awarded for outright placings.

== Championship results ==
Position	Manufacturer	Car	Class	Adelaide	Oran Pk	Sandown	Surfers	Total
1	Toyota	Toyota Celica	C	9	9	9	9	36
2	Ford	Ford Capri V6	B	-	9	9	9	27
=3	Holden	Holden VC Commodore	A	9	-	9	6	24
=3	Mazda	Mazda RX-3 & Mazda RX-7	B	9	3	6	6	24
=3	Mitsubishi	Mitsubishi Lancer	D	9	6	9	-	24
6	BMW	BMW 635CSi	A	3	-	-	4	7
7	Alfa Romeo	Alfa Romeo Alfetta	C	-	-	4	-	4
8	Triumph	Triumph Dolomite	C	-	-	3	-	3
9	Volkswagen	Volkswagen Golf	D	-	-	2	-	2
10	Chevrolet	Chevrolet Camaro	A	-	1	-	-	1

Note: Each manufacturer was ranked according to its best total class pointscore, e.g. Ford was awarded second place in the championship for the 27 points attained by Ford Capris in Class B, regardless of the points scored by Ford Falcons in Class A or Ford Escorts in Classes C & D. Only the best total class pointscore result for each manufacturer is shown in the above table.
