= 1980 Australian Championship of Makes =

The 1980 Australian Championship of Makes was a CAMS sanctioned Australian motor racing title open to Touring Cars complying with Group C regulations. It was the tenth manufacturers’ title to be awarded by CAMS and the fifth to carry the Australian Championship of Makes name. The title was awarded to Holden.

== Calendar ==
The 1980 Australian Championship of Makes was contested over a three-round series with one race per round.

Round	Name	Circuit	Date	Driver(s)	Team	Car	Report
1		Adelaide International Raceway	17 August	(Australia) Peter Brock	Holden VB Commodore	Holden Dealer Team	
2	Hang Ten 400	Sandown Park	14 September	(Australia) Peter Brock	Holden VC Commodore	Holden Dealer Team	Report
3	Compact Tennis 400	Surfers Paradise	2 November	(Australia) Charlie O'Brien	Holden VC Commodore	Roadways Gown-Hindhaugh	

== Classes ==
Cars competed in four engine displacement classes:

- Up to 1600cc
- 1600 to 2000cc
- 2001 to 3000cc
- 3001 to 6000cc

== Points system ==
Championship points were awarded on a 9-6-4-3-2-1 basis to the best six placed cars in each class. Only the highest scoring car of each make was awarded points and then only the points applicable to the position filled. The title was awarded to the make of car gaining the highest number of points in the series with all points acquired in all races counted. No drivers' title was allocated or permitted to be advertised in connection with the title.

== Results ==
Position	Make	Car
1	Holden	Holden Commodore
2	Toyota	Toyota Celica
3	Ford	Ford Capri
