= 1981 Hang Ten 400 =

The 1981 Hang Ten 400 was an endurance race for Group C Touring Cars. The event, which was Round 3 of the 1981 Australian Endurance Championship, was staged on 13 September over 119 laps of the 3.1 km Sandown International Motor Racing Circuit in Victoria, Australia. It was the 16th race in the history of what is now known as the Sandown 500.

Peter Brock drove a Marlboro Holden Dealer Team Holden VC Commodore to a record sixth consecutive Sandown endurance win and his seventh victory in the race. 1981 Australian Touring Car Champion Dick Johnson finished second after starting from pole position in the Plamer Tube Mills Ford XD Falcon. Third was the Roadways Gown Hindhaugh Holden VC Commodore of Steven Harrington and Garth Wigston.

Colin Bond and Steve Masterton were the winners of Class B in a Ford Capri V6, while Sydney's Peter Williamson won Class C with a Toyota Celica. Class D was won by Craig Bradtke and Rod Stevens driving a Mitsubishi Lancer.

== Classes ==
The field was divided into four engine capacity classes:

- Class A : 3001 to 6000 cc
- Class B : 2001 to 3000 cc
- Class C : 1601 to 2000 cc
- Class D : Up to 1600 cc

== Results ==
Pos.	Drivers	No.	Car	Entrant	Class	Laps
1	Peter Brock	05	Holden VC Commodore	Marlboro Holden Dealer Team	A	119
2	Dick Johnson	17	Ford XD Falcon	Palmer Tube Mills	A	118
3	Steven Harrington; Garth Wigston	27	Holden VC Commodore	Roadways Gown Hindhaugh	A	117
4	John Harvey; Vern Schuppan	25	Holden VC Commodore	Marlboro Holden Dealer Team	A	117
5	Murray Carter	18	Ford XD Falcon	Murray Carter	A	116
6	Allan Moffat	43	Mazda RX-7	Peter Stuyvesant International Racing	A	115
7	Allan Grice	44	BMW 635 CSi	Allan Grice Racing Pty. Ltd.	A	114
8	Neil Cunningham	19	Holden VC Commodore	Neil Cunningham	A	114
9	Colin Bond; Steve Masterton	32	Ford Capri V6	Masterton Homes Pty. Ltd.	B	112
10	Joe Moore; Christine Gibson	20	Ford XD Falcon	King George Tavern	A	111
11	Peter McLeod; Peter Dane	40	Mazda RX-7	Peter McLeod	A	110
12	Gerry Burges	54	Mazda RX-7	Gerry Burges	B	108
13	Garry Whittaker	78	Holden LX Torana SLR 5000 A9X	Garry Whittaker	A	107
14	Ray Allford; John Mann	14	Ford XD Falcon	Ray Allford	A	106
15	John Bundy; Norm Carr	69	Mazda RX-3	John Bundy	B	106
16	Peter Williamson	77	Toyota Celica	Toyota Dealer Team	C	103
17	Craig Bradtke; Rod Stevens	68	Mitsubishi Lancer 1600	Dandenong Mitsubishi	D	102
18	Bob Holden	52	Ford Escort Mk. II	Bob Holden Motors Manly Vale	C	102
19	Shane Cowhan; Brain Wheeler	73	Mazda RX-3	Shane Cowhan	B	102
20	Peter Boston	72	Isuzu Gemini	Peter Boton	D	101
21	John White	59	Holden Gemini	John White	D	98
22	Phil Brock; Gary Scott	65	Holden Gemini	H.D.T. Special Vehicles Pty Ltd	C	97
23	Phillip Revell; Ron Barnacle	84	Ford Escort 1.6 Ghia	Bob Holden Motors Manly Vale	D	94
24	Joseph Beninca; Peter Beninca	46	Alfa Romeo Alfetta	Beninca Motors	C	88
25	Chris Heyer	53	Volkswagen Golf GTi	Lennox Motors	D	87
26	Martin Power; Lorraine Orchard	49	Triumph Dolomite	Martin Power	D	69
DNF	Terry Daly; Peter Hopwood	36	Ford Capri IIS	Trend Windows Pty. Ltd.	B	83
DNF	Ken Price; Steve Jonas	48	Isuzu PF50	Douglas B Rutter	D	69
DNF	Alan Browne; Tony Edmondson	4	Holden VC Commodore	Re-Car Racing	A	65
DNF	Ron Wanless; Ralph Radburn	16	Holden VC Commodore	Re-Car Racing	A	63
DNF	John Faulkner; Gary Dumbrell	63	Ford Escort	Cherry City Ford	C	52
DNF	J.Duggan	42	Mazda RX-7	J.Duggan	A	51
DNF	Charlie O'Brien	2	Holden VC Commodore	Citizens Watches Australia	A	49
DNF	Bill O'Brien; Garry Cooke	30	Ford XD Falcon	Bill O'Brien	A	41
DNF	Jim Keogh; Andrew Newton	22	Ford XD Falcon	John Sands 3MP Racing	A	40
DNF	Garry Rogers; Clive Benson-Browne	11	Holden VC Commodore	The Launceston Hotel Pty. Ltd.	A	39
DNF	Peter Janson; Larry Perkins	3	Holden VC Commodore	Cadbury Schweppes Racing	A	38
DNF	Graeme Bailey; Steven Land	51	Toyota Celica	Chickadee Chicken	C	37
DNF	Scotty Taylor; Kevin Kennedy	26	Holden VC Commodore	Scotty Taylor Holden	A	28
DNF	Ian Burrell; Rob Shute	66	Mitsubishi Colt Mirage	Scottune	D	28
DNF	Warren Cullen	1	Holden VC Commodore	Warren Cullen	A	20
DNF	John Goss; Barry Seton	10	Jaguar XJ-S	Goss Garage	A	10
DNF	James Faneco	60	Isuzu PF50 Gemini Coupe	Country Dealer Team	D	8
DNF	Colin Spencer	60	Isuzu Gemini	Colin Spencer	D	4
DNF	Lawrie Nelson; Peter Jones	39	Ford Capri IIIS	Capri Components	B	2
DNF	Rusty French; Leo Leonard	6	Ford XD Falcon	Rusty French	A	0
DNS	Allan Gough	61	Isuzu Gemini Coupe	Country Dealer Team	D	-

== Statistics ==
- Entries in Official Programme - 55
- Pole Position - Dick Johnson (Ford XD Falcon) - 1m 11.9s
- Starters - 46
- Finishers - 26
- Non-finishers - 20
- Race time of winning car - 2h 30m 39.6s
- Fastest Lap - Unknown

Preceded by 1980 Hang Ten 400	Sandown 400; 1981	Succeeded by 1982 Castrol 400
