= 1980 Hang Ten 400 =

The 1980 Hang Ten 400 was a motor race for Group C Touring Cars. The event, which was Round 2 of the 1980 Australian Championship of Makes, was staged on 14 September 1980 over 109 laps of the 3.1 km Sandown Park circuit in Victoria, Australia, a total distance of 337.9 km. It was the fifteenth Sandown endurance race.

The race was won by Peter Brock driving a Holden Commodore VC.

== Classes ==
The field was divided into the following four engine capacity classes:

- Class A : 3001 to 6000 cc
- Class B : 2001 to 3000 cc
- Class C : 1601 to 2000 cc
- Class D : Up to 1600 cc

== Results ==
Position	Drivers	No.	Car	Entrant	Class	Class Pos.	Laps
1	Peter Brock	05	Holden Commodore VC	Marlboro Holden Dealer Team	A	1	109
2	Garry Rogers	16	Holden Commodore VB	Greater Pacific Finance Co.	A	2	108
3	Allan Moffat	25	Holden Commodore VC	Marlboro Holden Dealer Team	A	3	107
4	Murray Carter	18	Ford Falcon XD	Magnum Wheels	A	4	107
5	Gary Cooke	11	Holden Commodore VB	Citizen Watches Aust. Pty Ltd	A	5	106
6	Ray Cutchie	40	Ford Escort RS2000	Rex Monahan	C	1	100
7	Peter Hopwood	36	Ford Capri	Trend Windows Pty Ltd	B	1	99
8	Terry Wade	52	Triumph Dolomite Sprint	B & G Myers Leyland	C	2	98
9	Joseph Beninca	48	Alfa Romeo Alfetta GTV	Beninca Motors	C	3	97
10	Ray Allford	26	Ford Falcon XD	R. Allford	A	6	97
11	Steven Brook	46	Ford Escort RS2000	Formula Ford Australia	C	4	95
12	Roger Cartwight	41	Ford Escort RS2000	R. Cartwright	C	5	95
13	Peter Granger	53	BMW 2002	Bob Glazier	C	6	95
14	Alan Browne	15	Holden Commodore VB	Re-Car Racing	A	7	92
15	Bob Holden	65	Ford Escort 1600	Formula Ford Australia	D	1	92
16	John Bristow	45	Toyota Celica	Cord Car Co.	C	7	91
17	Ian Burrell	57	Mitsubishi Lancer	Scottune	D	2	91
18	Jim Faneco	60	Holden Gemini	Country Dealer Team	D	3	90
19	Steve Masterton, Colin Bond	31	Ford Capri	Masterton Homes P/L	B	2	89
20	Kevin Kennedy	19	Holden Torana	Scotty Taylor Holden	A	8	89
21	Ken Price	55	Holden Gemini	C.A.R.S. Gemini Racing Team	D	4	87
22	Peter McLeod	30	Mazda RX-7	McLeod Mazda - Albion Park Rail	B	3	86
23	Graeme Bailey	51	Toyota Celica	Chickadee Chicken	C	8	84
DNF	Charlie O'Brien	10	Holden Commodore VC	Roadways / Gown-Hindhaugh	A		86
DNF	Peter Williamson	44	Toyota Celica	Peter Williamson Pty Ltd	C		64
DNF	Lawrie Nelson	29	Ford Capri IIIS	Capri Components	B		61
DNF	John Faulkner	43	Ford Escort RS2000	Allbrells Autocar Centre	C		45
DNF	Ron Dickson	2	Chevrolet Camaro Z28	Ron Dickson Racing	A		33
DNF	Bob Morris	7	Ford Falcon XD	Channel 7 Breville Racing	A		32
DNF	Allan Grice	6	Holden Commodore VB	Craven Mild 7 Racing	A		30
DNF	Ken Harrison	61	Ford Escort 1600	K. Harrison	D		30
DNF	Chris Heyer	63	Volkswagen Golf	Lennox Motors	D		27
DNF	John Bundy	33	Mazda RX-3	J. Bundy	B		25
DNF	Jim Keogh	22	Ford Falcon XD	J. Keogh	A		25
DNF	Gerald Kay	49	Triumph Dolomite Sprint	Jag Parts	C		24
DNF	Gary Rowe	59	Holden Gemini	Country Dealer Team	D		16
DNF	Allan Bryant	28	Mazda RX-7	Precinct Performance	B		15
DNF	John Gates	23	Holden Torana SL/R 5000	"ITP" The Income Tax Professionals	A		12
DNF	Peter Janson	3	Holden Commodore VC	Cadbury Schweppes Pty Ltd	A		9
DNF	Robert Muir, Kingsley Hibbard	24	Ford Falcon XD	Robert Muir Motors	A		8
DNF	Larry Kogge	27	Mazda RX-3	L. Kogge	B		6
DNF	Graham Mein	50	Ford Escort RS2000	G. Mein	C		5
DNF	Lou Stoopman	71	BMW 2002	L. Stoopman	C		5
DNF	Colin Spencer	56	Holden Gemini	C.A.R.S. Gemini Racing Team	D		1

== Notes ==
- Attendance: 45,000
- Pole position: Peter Brock, 1m 13.9s

Preceded by 1979 Hang Ten 400	Sandown 400; 1980	Succeeded by 1981 Hang Ten 400
