= 1980 Australian Touring Car Championship =

Motor racing competition

Seasons
- ← 1979 1981 →

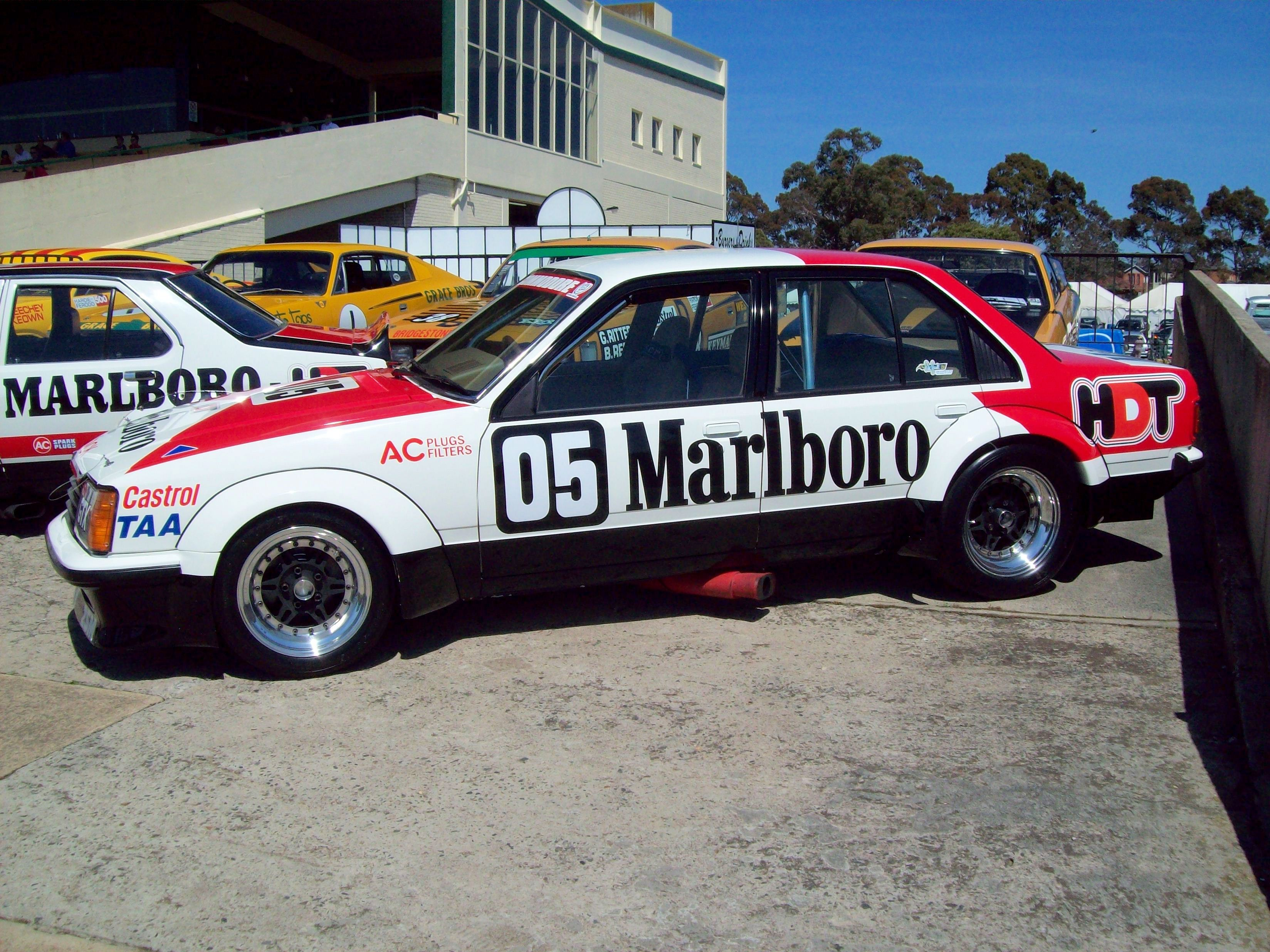
Peter Brock's championship winning Holden VB Commodore on display at Sandown in 2009

The 1980 Australian Touring Car Championship was an Australian motor racing competition for Group C Touring Cars. Authorised by the Confederation of Australian Motor Sport as a National Title, it was the 21st Australian Touring Car Championship.

The championship was won by Peter Brock driving a Holden Commodore VB.

== Season summary ==
Peter Brock won his third and final ATCC title, driving a Holden VB Commodore for the Marlboro Holden Dealer Team which he had purchased from team owner/manager John Sheppard in late 1979 after Holden had pulled out of the sport following the domination by the Toranas in 1978 and 1979. After buying the team, Brock, backed by Adelaide based Holden dealer Vin Keane, actually went around Australia to the Holden dealers in a successful attempt to help finance the team which also saw the launch of the HDT Special Vehicles which built "hotter" versions of the road-going Holden Commodore. This effectively meant that for the first time since being founded by Harry Firth in 1969, the HDT was actually a Dealers Team rather than a backdoor factory operation. Brock and Sheppard had been secretly testing a VB Commodore in late 1979 in readiness for the rule changes enforced by CAMS. These rule changes aimed at reducing engine emissions, mostly sparked by the 1970s Oil Crisis, effectively made the Toranas and Falcon Hardtops of the previous years ineligible. By the start of the ATCC, Brock and the HDT were the only team anywhere near ready to race, and it showed in the results. Brock won four of the eight rounds, including the opening three rounds. He also put his Commodore on pole position at each round of the championship.

Former twice CAMS Gold Star winner and 1974 Hardie-Ferodo 1000 winner Kevin Bartlett recovered from his 1979 Formula 5000 crash and finished second in the championship in his Channel 9 sponsored Chevrolet Camaro Z28 (financed by Nine's owner, media magnate and one of the richest people in Australia, Kerry Packer). Bartlett broke Brock's winning run, using the superior power of the 5.7-litre Chevrolet to win at Sandown, and would later win the penultimate round in Adelaide. Bartlett's win at Sandown was the first non-Ford or Holden outright ATCC win since Bob Jane took his championship winning Chevrolet Camaro ZL-1 to victory in Round 6 of the 1972 ATCC at Surfers Paradise.

Sydney based Toyota dealer Peter Williamson finished third in the championship in his Class B Toyota Celica, benefiting from class wins and generally poor or small fields (especially in the outright Class A) resulting from teams rushing to get the new generation cars race ready.

Reigning champion Bob Morris had lost his major sponsor when Ron Hodgson had pulled out at the end of 1979, so Morris entered into an uneasy relationship with Allan Grice's Craven Mild Racing which was run by Morris' former Bathurst co-driver Frank Gardner. Grice drove one of the 1979 Toranas to victory at Wanneroo in Perth. The Torana, with drum brakes at the rear as well as the required "low emission" heads, had seen a drop in horsepower from 1979's 380 bhp (283 kW; 385 PS) to just on 300 bhp (224 kW; 304 PS). Grice only competed in four rounds and finished eighth in the title. Morris endured an unhappy championship trying to develop the teams Commodore and could only finish fifth on points, though he did win the final round at Oran Park.

After Ford Australia pulled out of racing at the end of 1978, and being forced to go it alone as a privateer in 1979, the 1980 ATCC was the first time since 1968 that triple champion Allan Moffat did not contest the championship, with the Canadian born driver instead winning the Australian Sports Car Championship in a Porsche 930 Turbo.

After winning four ATCC titles during the 1970s, this would prove to be the only ATCC won by a Holden driver during the 1980s. The next win would not be until 1994.

== Teams and drivers ==
The following drivers and teams competed in the 1980 Australian Touring Car Championship.

Team	Car	No	Driver
Ron Dickson	Chevrolet Camaro Z28	2	(Australia) Ron Dickson
Cadbury-Schweppes Racing	Holden LX Torana A9X SS Hatchback	3	(New Zealand) Peter Janson
Wayne Negus	Holden VB Commodore	4	(Australia) Wayne Negus
Marlboro Holden Dealer Team	Holden VB Commodore	05	(Australia) Peter Brock
Craven Mild Racing	Holden LX Torana A9X SS Hatchback	6	(Australia) Allan Grice
Craven Mild Racing	Holden VB Commodore	7	(Australia) Bob Morris
Garry Willmington	Ford XD Falcon	8	(Australia) Garry Willmington
Nine Network Racing Team	Chevrolet Camaro Z28	9	(Australia) Kevin Bartlett
Gary Cooke	Holden VB Commodore	11	(Australia) Gary Cooke
John French	Alfa Romeo 2000 GTV	12	(Australia) John French
Fred Geissler	Holden VB Commodore	16	(Australia) Fred Geissler
Murray Carter	Ford XD Falcon	18	(Australia) Murray Carter
Roadways Racing	Holden VB Commodore	21	(Australia) Charlie O'Brien (Australia) Garth Wigston
Re-Car Racing	Holden VB Commodore	26	(Australia) Alan Browne (Australia) Brian Sampson
Bill O'Brien	Ford XC Falcon	30	(Australia) Bill O'Brien
Masterton Homes	Ford Capri Mk.II	31	(Australia) Steve Masterton (Australia) Colin Bond
Don Smith	Ford Capri Mk.III	35	(Australia) Don Smith
Barry Jones	Mazda RX-3	39	(Australia) Barry Jones
Peter McLeod	Mazda RX-7	40	(Australia) Peter McLeod
Larry Kogge	Mazda RX-3	41	(Australia) Larry Kogge
John Faulkner	Ford Escort Mk.II	43	(New Zealand) John Faulkner
Toyota Dealer Team	Toyota Corolla	44	(Australia) Mike Quinn
Graham Mein	Ford Escort Mk.II	45	(Australia) Graham Mein
Ross Burbidge	Mazda RX-3	46	(Australia) Ross Burbidge
Wally Scott	Toyota Celica	47	(Australia) Wally Scott
Evan Thomas	Mazda RX-3	48	(Australia) Evan Thomas
Martin Power	Triumph Dolomite Sprint	49	(Australia) Martin Power
Chickadee Chicken	Toyota Celica	51	(Australia) Graeme Bailey
Maurice Spalding	Toyota Celica	55	(Australia) Maurice Spalding
Lawrie Nelson	Ford Capri Mk.III	58	(Australia) Lawrie Nelson
Frank Porter	Alfa Romeo Alfetta GTV	59	(Australia) Frank Porter
Jim Faneco	Holden Gemini	60	(Australia) Jim Faneco
Ray Gulson	Alfa Romeo Alfetta GTV	67	(Australia) Ray Gulson
John Bundy	Mazda RX-3	69	(Australia) John Bundy
Toyota Dealer Team	Toyota Celica	77	(Australia) Peter Williamson

== Race calendar ==
The championship was contested over eight rounds, each comprising either one race or two heats.

Rd.	Race title	Circuit	City / state	Date	Winner	Team	Report
1	Launceston	Symmons Plains Raceway	Launceston, Tasmania	2 March	Peter Brock	Marlboro Holden Dealer Team	
2	Calder	Calder Park Raceway	Melbourne, Victoria	15 March	Peter Brock	Marlboro Holden Dealer Team	
3	Lakeside	Lakeside International Raceway	Brisbane, Queensland	30 March	Peter Brock	Marlboro Holden Dealer Team	
4	Sandown	Sandown Raceway	Melbourne, Victoria	13 April	Kevin Bartlett	Nine Network Racing Team	
5	Perth	Wanneroo Park	Perth, Western Australia	27 April	Allan Grice	Craven Mild Racing	
6	Surfers Paradise	Surfers Paradise Raceway	Surfers Paradise, Queensland	18 May	Peter Brock	Marlboro Holden Dealer Team	
7	Adelaide	Adelaide International Raceway	Adelaide, South Australia	1 June	Kevin Bartlett	Nine Network Racing Team	
8	Oran Park	Oran Park Raceway	Sydney, New South Wales	16 June	Bob Morris	Craven Mild Racing	

== Classes ==
Cars competed in two displacement classes:

- Up to and including 3000cc
- 3001 to 6000cc

The up to and including 3000cc class was contested by Alfa Romeo Alfetta, Ford Capri, Ford Escort, Isuzu Gemini, Mazda RX-3, Mazda RX-7, Toyota Celica and Toyota Corolla.

The 3001 to 6000cc class was contested by Chevrolet Camaro, Ford Falcon, Holden Commodore and Holden Torana.

== Points system ==
Points were awarded for the first four outright places at each round on a 4-3-2-1 basis. In addition, points were awarded for the first six places in each class at each round on a 9-6-4-3-2-1 basis. Drivers had to drop their worst score from the eight rounds.

== Championship standings ==
Pos	Driver	Car	Sym.	Cal.	Lak.	San.	Wan.	Sur.	Ade.	Ora.	Pts
1	Peter Brock	Holden VB Commodore	13	13	13	9	9	13	9	Ret	79
2	Kevin Bartlett	Chevrolet Camaro Z28	9	9	4	13	4	Ret	13	DSQ	52
3	Peter Williamson	Toyota Celica	4		7	6		10	9	11	47
4	Murray Carter	Ford XD Falcon		6	9	6	2	6	1	2	32
5	Bob Morris	Holden VB Commodore	2	Ret	Ret	Ret	6	Ret	4	13	25
6	Don Smith	Ford Capri Mk.III			11			6	6		23
7	Lawrie Nelson	Ford Capri Mk.III	9	9	Ret	2	Ret				20
8	Allan Grice	Holden LX Torana SS	6	Ret			13			Ret	19
9	Steve Masterton	Ford Capri Mk.II	6	6		4					16
10	Charlie O'Brien	Holden VB Commodore						9	6		15
11	Mike Quinn	Toyota Corolla		4	4					4	12
11	Garry Willmington	Ford XD Falcon	4	4	0	1		3			12
13	Wally Scott	Toyota Celica					9	2			11
14	Barry Jones	Mazda RX-3		Ret		9					9
14	Gary Cooke	Holden VB Commodore								9	9
14	Larry Kogge	Mazda RX-3		2		3			4		9
14	Bill O'Brien	Ford XC Falcon	1	2		4		2			9
14	John Bundy	Mazda RX-3	1	3					3	2	9
19	Maurice Spalding	Toyota Celica					6				6
19	Colin Bond	Ford Capri Mk.II								6	6
19	Ross Burbidge	Mazda RX-3			2			4			6
22	Brian Sampson	Holden VB Commodore								5	5
23	John Faulkner	Ford Escort Mk.II	3						1		4
24	John French	Alfa Romeo 2000 GTV			3						3
24	Evan Thomas	Mazda RX-3						3			3
24	Fred Geissler	Holden VB Commodore								3	3
24	Graeme Bailey	Toyota Celica								3	3
24	Alan Browne	Holden VB Commodore						1	2		3
24	Peter McLeod	Mazda RX-7						Ret	2	1	3
30	Martin Power	Triumph Dolomite Sprint	2	0							2
30	Peter Janson	Holden LX Torana SS				2					2
30	Frank Porter	Alfa Romeo Alfetta GTV		1		1					2
33	Ron Dickson	Chevrolet Camaro Z28		1							1
33	Wayne Negus	Holden VB Commodore				1					1
33	Graham Mein	Ford Escort Mk.II					1				1
Pos	Driver	Car	Sym.	Cal.	Lak.	San.	Wan.	Sur.	Ade.	Ora.	Pts

Colour	Result
Gold	Winner
Silver	Second place
Bronze	Third place
Green	Points classification
Blue	Non-points classification
Blue	Non-classified finish (NC)
Purple	Retired, not classified (Ret)
Red	Did not qualify (DNQ)
Red	Did not pre-qualify (DNPQ)
Black	Disqualified (DSQ)
White	Did not start (DNS)
White	Withdrew (WD)
White	Race cancelled (C)
Blank	Did not practice (DNP)
Blank	Did not arrive (DNA)
Blank	Excluded (EX)
