= Holden Commodore (VB) =

Australian mid-size car

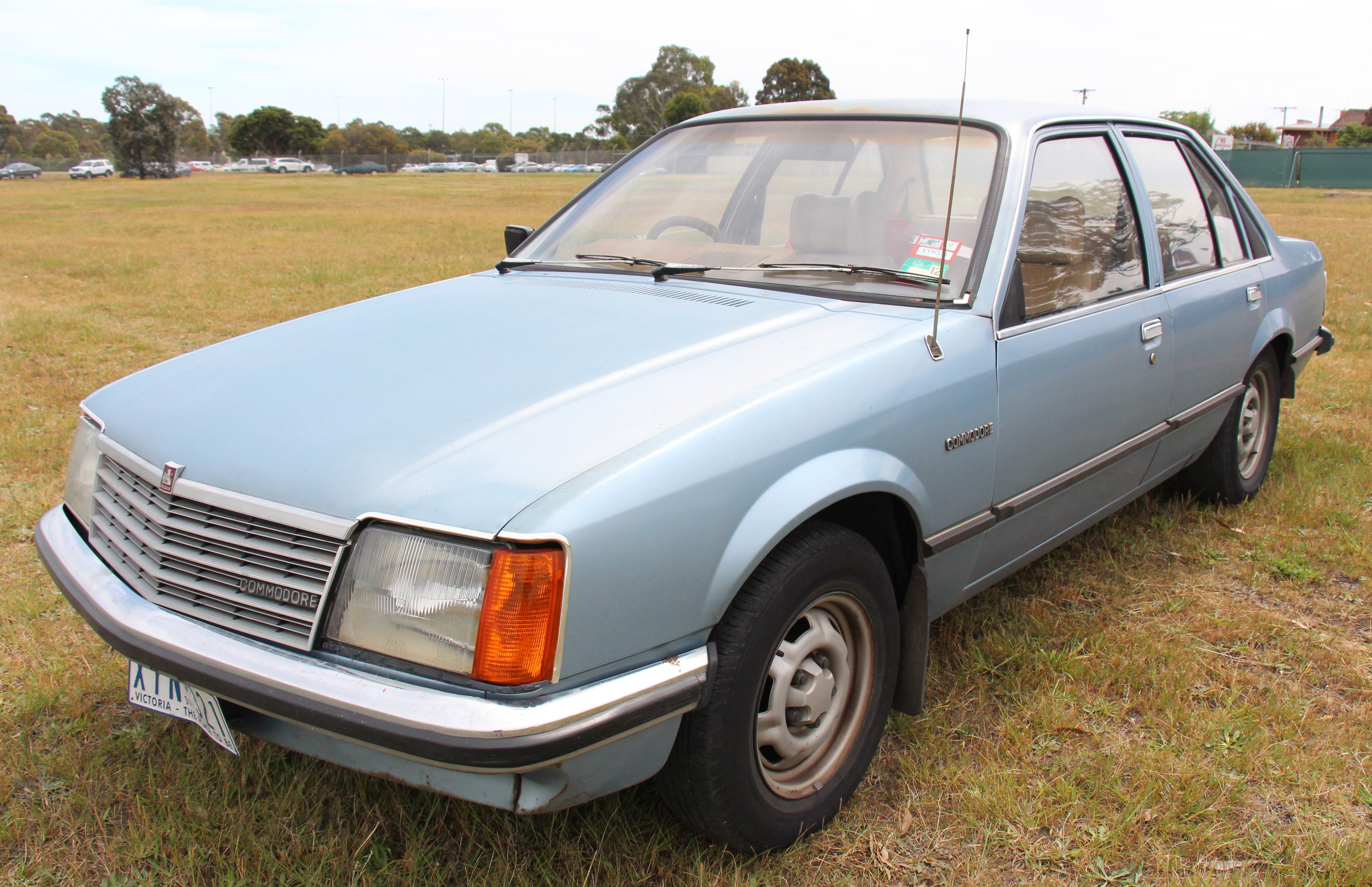
- 1979 Holden Commodore (VB) sedan

Overview
- Manufacturer: Holden
- Production: October 1978 – March 1980
- Assembly: Australia: Sydney, New South Wales (Pagewood), Melbourne, Victoria (Dandenong); New Zealand: Wellington (Trentham)
- Designer: Leo Pruneau

Body and chassis
- Class: Mid-size car
- Body style: 4-door sedan 5-door station wagon
- Platform: GM V platform
- Related: Opel Rekord E Opel Senator; Vauxhall Carlton; Opel Commodore C

Powertrain
- Engine: 2.85 L Red I6; 3.3 L Red I6; 4.2 L Red V8; 5.0 L Red V8
- Transmission: 4-speed manual 3-speed Tri-Matic automatic 3-speed THM350 automatic (5.0 L V8); 3-speed THM400 automatic (5.0 L V8)

Dimensions
- Wheelbase: 2,668 mm (105.0 in)
- Length: 4,705–4,729 mm (185.2–186.2 in)
- Width: 1,722 mm (67.8 in)
- Height: 1,371 mm (54.0 in)

Chronology
- Predecessor: Holden HZ
- Successor: Holden Commodore (VC)

The Holden Commodore (VB) is a mid-size car that was produced by Holden, from 1978 to 1980. It was the first iteration of the first generation of the Holden Commodore, and was the Holden version of the General Motors V-body (V78) platform - developed primarily as the Opel Rekord E/Commodore C.

The car was officially launched on 26 October 1978 with showrooms receiving the first examples on 13 November 1978. Production of the VB only lasted seventeen months, the shortest life span of any Commodore. The VB Commodore was effectively the successor of the Holden HZ, although most models in that series continued to be produced until the introduction of the facelifted VC Commodore on 30 March 1980.

The VB became Australia's number one selling car in 1979, the model's first full year of production. The VB also won Wheels Car of the Year award for 1978, with the car being praised for its value for money and referred to as "the best Australian car ever."

== History ==
The VB Commodore was based on the 1977 Opel Rekord E but with the front grafted on from the Opel Senator A to accommodate the larger Holden inline-six and V8 engines. Opel went on to use the same Rekord-Senator combination for its own Commodore C (called Vauxhall Viceroy in the United Kingdom and Chevrolet Commodore in South Africa). Overall, the body was strengthened substantially to withstand the harsh conditions of the Australian outback. The dashboard and interior were carried over largely unaltered from the Opel Rekord, except for some details such as the indicator stalk being moved to the right hand side of the steering column in line with Australian convention. Total cost of development is reported to be over A$110 million. It had a 35 percent parts commonality with the Rekord.

The Commodore represented a major shift in thinking for Holden since it was significantly smaller than the previous full-size family car, the Holden Kingswood, but visually similar in size to the mid-size Torana / Sunbird sedans. It had a 14 percent smaller body, while retaining 96 percent of the interior space of the Kingswood. It essentially came about in response to the 1973 oil crisis and the need to produce more fuel-efficient cars. Holden, hedging their bets, initially built the Commodore alongside the other two established body styles, until the Torana was dropped in mid-1979, with only the Sunbird surviving into mid-1980 following release of the updated VC Commodore.

The VB was available in three specification levels: Commodore, Commodore SL, and Commodore SL/E. A station wagon variant – not available in SL/E form – was released on 24 July 1979, hitting showrooms on 6 August 1979. It featured a large cargo area and a one-piece lift-up tailgate. As the wagon-specific sheet metal from the Rekord was imported from Germany, the wagon suffered from component differences from the sedan, with separate keys for the ignition system and rear door.

=== Production ===
95,906 VB Commodores were built during its 17-month production period, being replaced by the VC Commodore in March 1980. 92,445 were built and sold locally, along with 2,832 complete knock-down kits (for New Zealand) and another 629 fully built-up exports. It was Australia's best selling car in 1979.

Production was at Holden's Pagewood and Dandenong plants. Assembly of the VB Commodore in New Zealand began in 1979.

== Powertrains ==
The OHV engines were largely carried over from the Kingswood: a 2.85-litre straight-six, 3.3-litre straight-six, a 4.2-litre V8, and a 5.0-litre. The V8 engines were also available with dual exhausts and higher outputs. The engine blocks on these motors were painted red and are therefore commonly referred to as the Red motors.

Powertrains
Eng. disp.; configuration	Engine	Power	Torque	Transmission
2.85 L; I6	straight-six motor (Red)	64 kW (86 hp)		4-speed manual 3-speed Tri-Matic automatic
3.3 L; I6	straight-six motor (Red)	71 kW (95 hp)		4-speed manual 3-speed Tri-Matic automatic
4.2 L; V8	V8 engine (Red)	87 kW (117 hp)	271 N⋅m (200 lb⋅ft)	4-speed manual 3-speed Tri-Matic automatic
4.2 L; V8 (dual exhaust)	V8 engine (Red)	96 kW (129 hp)	275 N⋅m (203 lb⋅ft)	4-speed manual 3-speed Tri-Matic automatic
5.0 L; V8	V8 engine (Red)	114 kW (153 hp)		4-speed manual 3-speed THM350 automatic 3-speed THM400 automatic
5.0 L; V8 (dual exhaust)	V8 engine (Red)	125 kW (168 hp)		4-speed manual 3-speed THM350 automatic 3-speed THM400 automatic

== Models ==
All V8s came equipped with standard power steering. On the station wagon, there was no 15x6 inch alloy wheels option.

=== Commodore ===
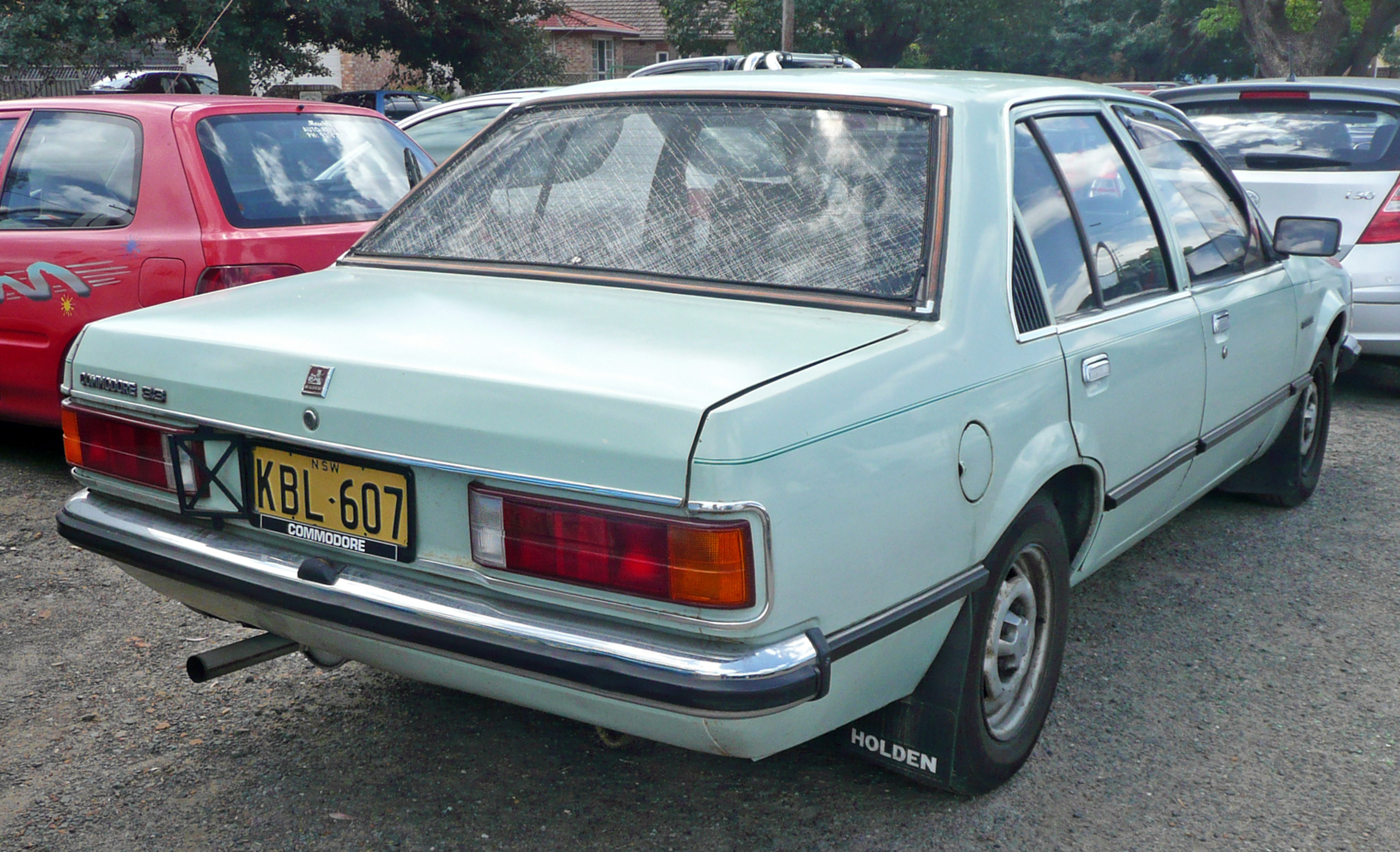
Holden Commodore sedan (base model)

The Commodore was the base model, and was available as a sedan or station wagon. It featured: a 2.85-litre 64 kW (86 hp) Red inline-six engine (I6) equipped with a 4-speed manual transmission, body-colour tail panel, silver finish on instrument surrounds, Vinyl trim, and steel wheels. Optional availability included a 3.3-litre 66 kW (89 hp) "Red" I6 or 4.2-litre 87 kW (117 hp) "Red" V8 engine, a 3-speed automatic transmission, air conditioning, corded cloth interior, and power steering.

The optional European Pack incorporated: a 3.3-litre 66 kW (89 hp) Red I6, full instrumentation, four wheel discs, Headlight washers / wipers, and 15 inch alloy wheels. The Sport Pack (manual only) which incorporated: 4.2-litre 84 kW (113 hp) Red V8, full instrumentation, four wheel discs brakes, headlight washers/wipers, and 15x6 inch alloy wheels.

=== Commodore SL ===
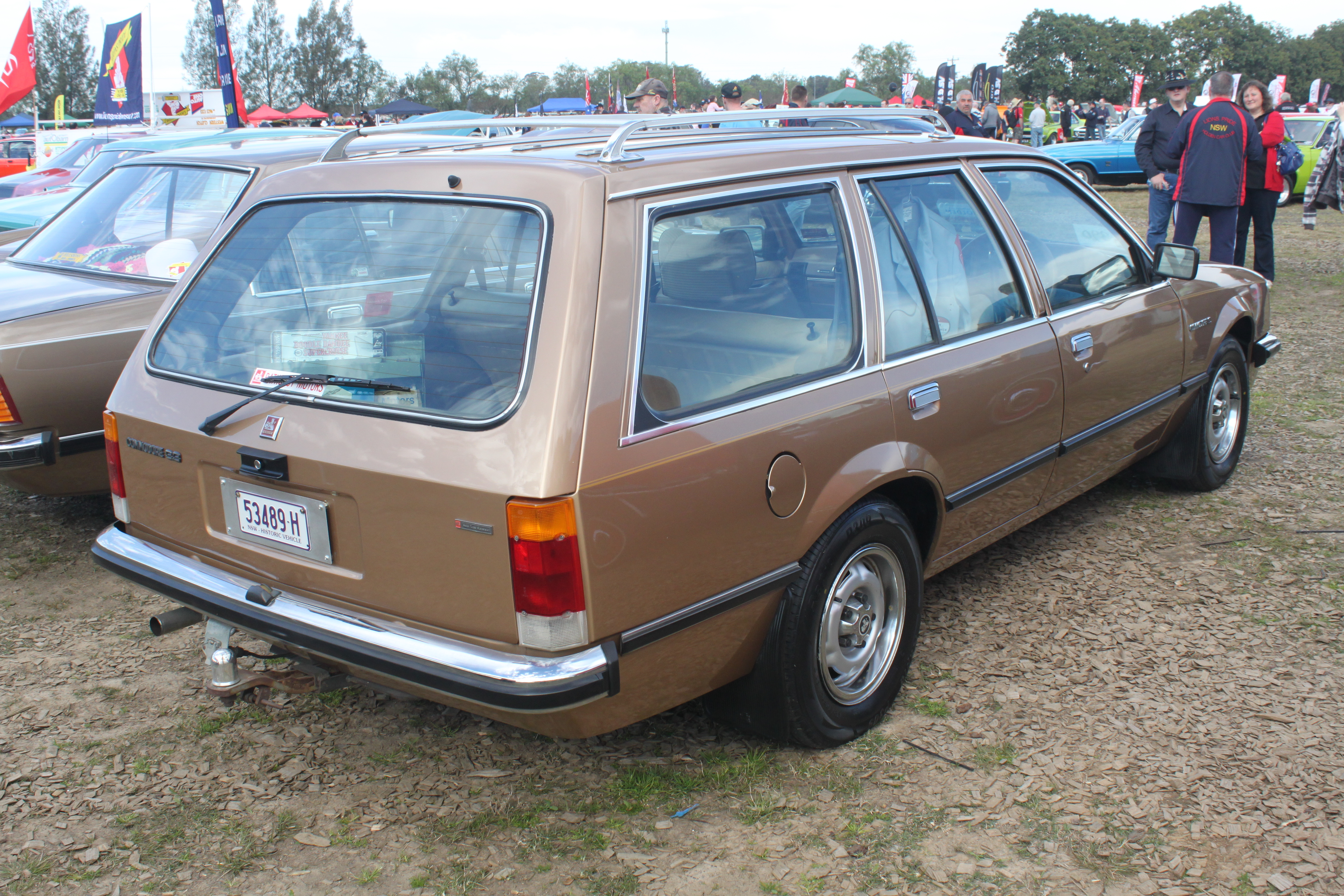
Holden Commodore SL wagon

The Commodore SL was the mid-range variant, and was available as a sedan or station wagon. It featured: a3.3-litre 71 kW (95 hp) Red I6 equipped with a 3-speed automatic transmission, right door mouldings, chrome wheeltrim rings, corded velour cloth trim, extra gauges for volts and oil pressure, vertical accent bars on the grille, inertia reel seatbelts for the outer rear passengers, rear centre armrest, rosewood dash finish, silver tail panel, twin exterior mirrors, variable intermittent speed wipers, steel wheels. With optional: 4.2-litre 87 kW (117 hp) Red V8, air conditioning, power steering, full instrumentation, four wheel discs brakes, headlight washers/wipers, 4-speed manual transmission, vinyl upholstery, 15x6 inch alloy wheels.

=== Commodore SL/E ===
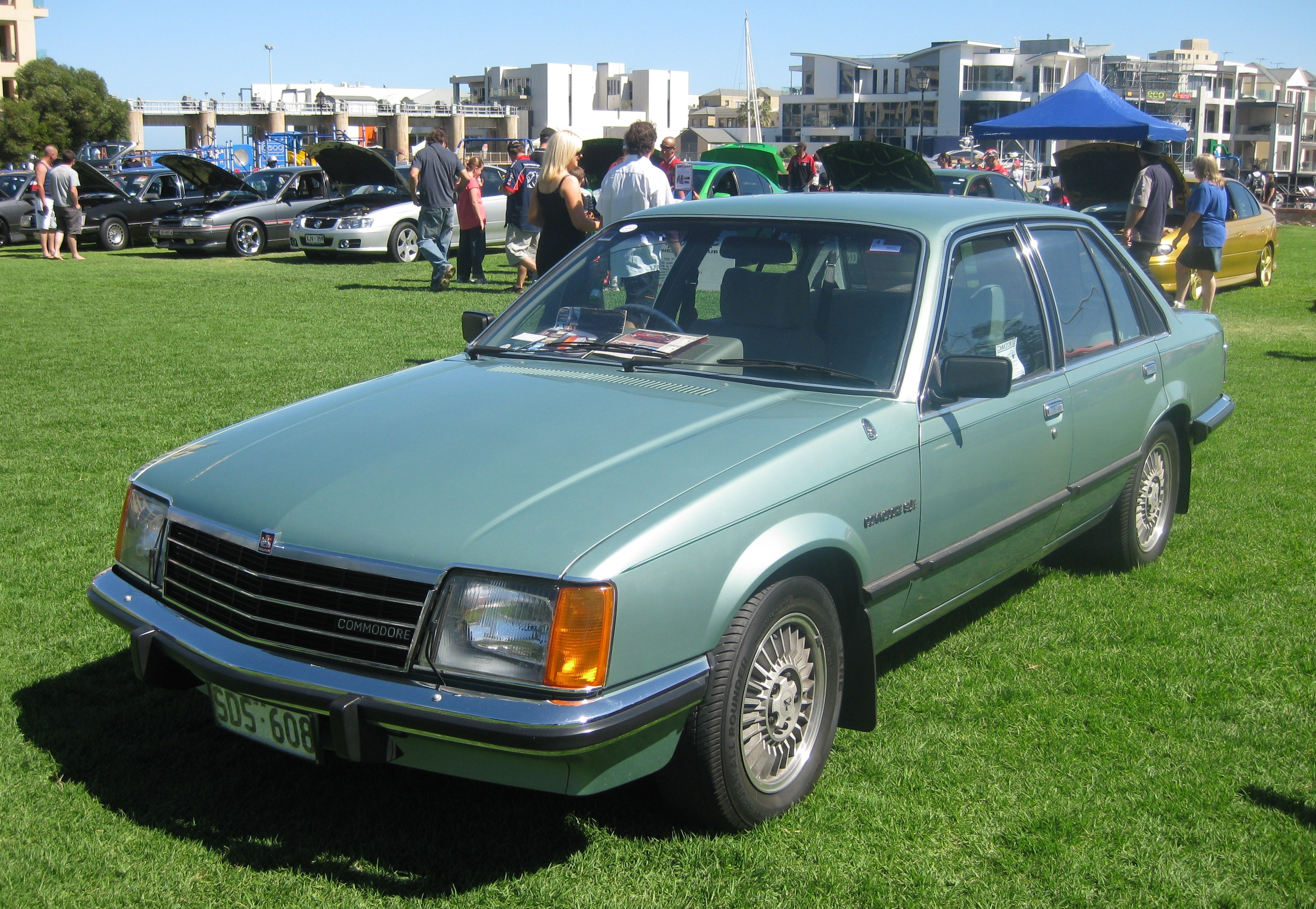
Holden Commodore SL/E sedan

The Commodore SL/E was the top-of-the-line luxury variant. It was available as a sedan only. It featured: a 4.2-litre 87 kW (117 hp) Red V8 equipped with a 3-speed automatic transmission, air conditioning, black door frames and tail panel, blacked out grille, burr walnut dash, chrome exhaust, chrome door handles, extended rear bumpers, Blaupunkt stereo radio cassette player, electric aerial, headlight wiper/washers, power steering, reading lights, retractable seatbelts, reversing mirror, tachometer, velour trim, cut pile carpet, four wheel disc brakes, 15x6 inch alloy wheels. With optional: 3.3 L 71 kW (95 hp) Red I6, 5.0 L 114 kW (153 hp) Red V8 which incorporated: Turbo-Hydramatic 350 or 400 transmission, 4-speed manual transmission, central locking, power windows.

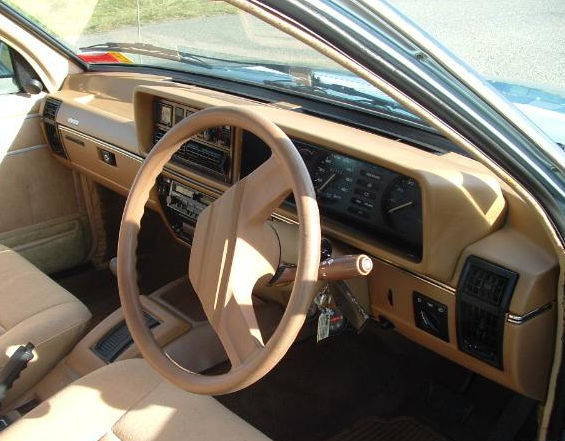
Holden Commodore SL/E interior

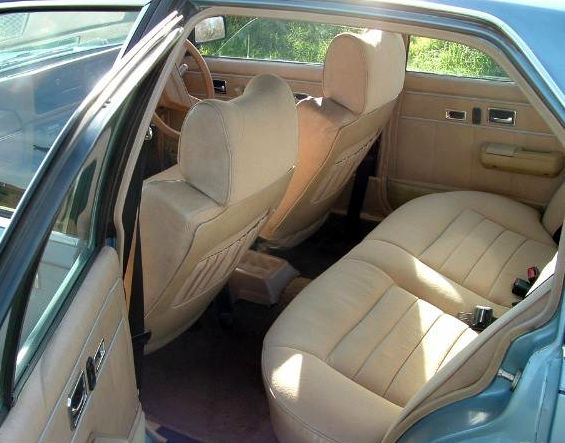
Holden Commodore SL/E interior

== Motorsport ==
The VB Commodore featured heavily in Australian motorsport in the latter part of 1979 and through most of 1980.

In 1979, the factory backed Holden Dealer Team entered a three-car VB Commodore team in the 20,000-kilometre (12,000 mi) Repco Round Australia Trial which started and finished at the Royal Melbourne Showgrounds and travelled clockwise around the country over some of the most inhospitable terrain imaginable. The team Commodores were powered by the 3.3-litre straight-six Holden Red motor rather than the more powerful V8 due to their much lighter weight. Anxious to prove the then new cars' reliability, the cars were perfectly prepared and finished first, second and third. Lead HDT driver Peter Brock won the event along with co-drivers Matt Phillip and Noel Richards. Brock has cited this event as his career highlight as it was an event in which many motor racing experts throughout Australia, as well as the media, did not believe he would do well in despite his previous rally and rallycross exploits.

With new regulations for Group C Touring car racing introduced by the Confederation of Australian Motor Sport in 1980 which forced teams to use low emission engines, the HDT (by now owned by Brock and with actual support from Holden dealers after Holden had pulled out of racing at the end of 1979) had been secretly testing a VB Commodore as its replacement for the A9X Torana. The new regulations saw that the Holden's racing 5.0-litre V8 engine had a drop in power from 1979's 380 hp (283 kW) to approximately 300 hp (224 kW). However, the new regulations also saw to it that the HDT had arguably the only race ready car for the 1980 Australian Touring Car Championship. Peter Brock won the championship in his VB Commodore, winning four of the eight rounds while claiming pole position at each and every round. 1979 ATCC winner Bob Morris also won a round of the championship driving his Craven Mild Racing VB Commodore.

Brock then won the 1980 CRC 300 at Sydney's Amaroo Park circuit before upgrading to the VC Commodore by the Hang Ten 400 at Sandown Raceway. The VB's final placing in an Australian touring car race was a strong third place by Ian "Pete" Geoghegan and Paul Gulson at the 1980 Bathurst 1000 at Bathurst (Brock and Jim Richards won their third straight Bathurst 1000 in their VC Commodore).

The VB is only one of two Commodore models (along with the VN) not to have won the Bathurst 1000.
