= Ford Falcon (XD) =

Australian full-size car, 1979-1982

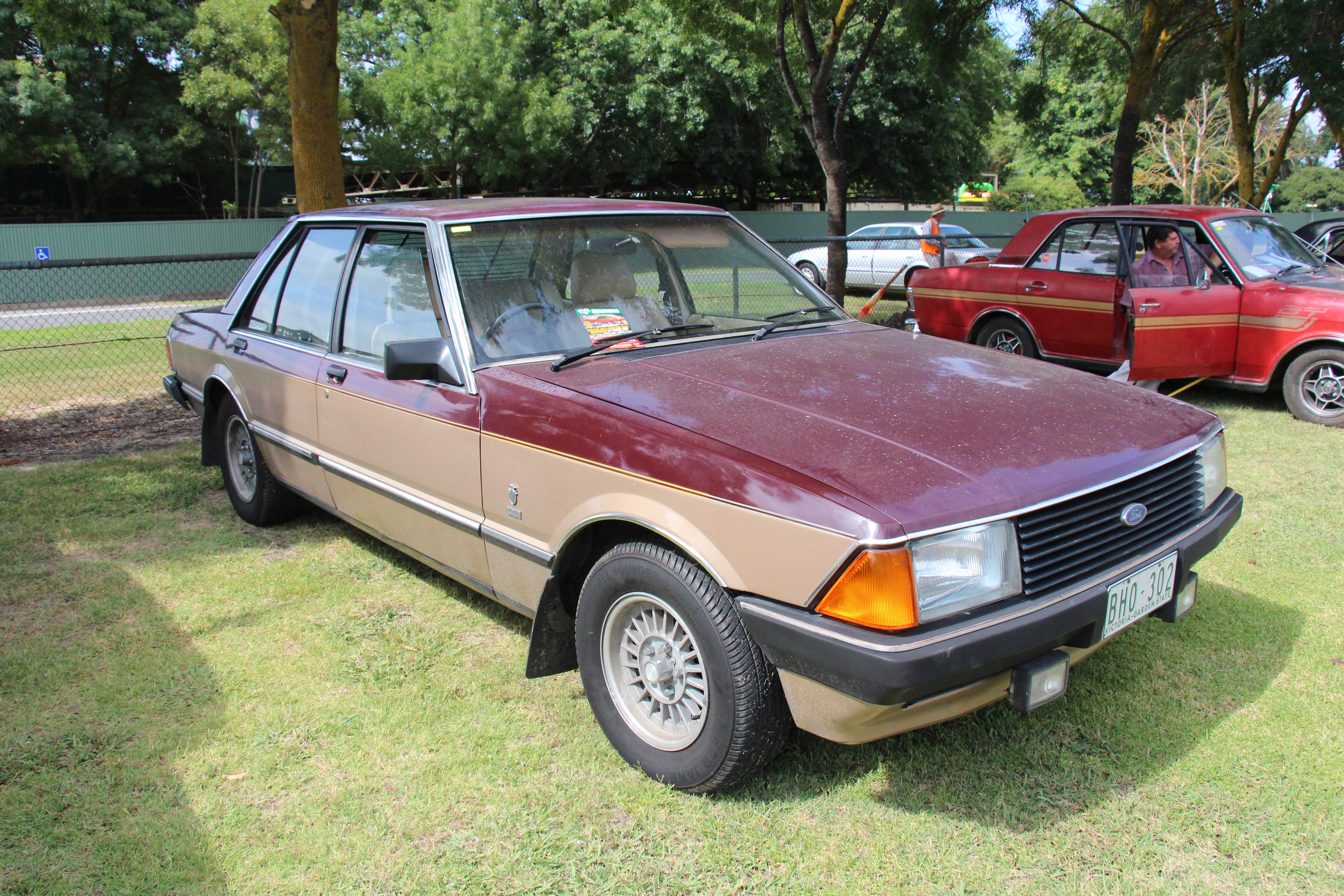
- Ford Fairmont Ghia Limited Edition sedan

Overview
- Manufacturer: Ford Australia
- Also called: Ford Fairmont (XD)
- Production: March 1979 – March 1982

Body and chassis
- Class: Full-size car
- Body style: 4-door sedan; 5-door station wagon; 2-door coupé utility; 2-door panel van
- Layout: FR layout
- Related: Ford Fairlane (ZJ); Ford LTD (FC)

Powertrain
- Engine: 3.3 L I6; 4.1 L I6; 4.9 L V8; 5.8 L V8
- Transmission: 3-speed automatic (column, floor); 3-speed Borg Warner 0501 manual (column); 4-speed Borg Warner 0503 manual (floor); 4-speed Borg Warner 0506 manual (floor)

Dimensions
- Wheelbase: 2,819 mm (111.0 in) (sedan); 2,946 mm (116.0 in) (wagon)
- Length: 4,737 mm (186.5 in) (sedan); 4,982 mm (196.1 in) (wagon)
- Width: 1,860 mm (73 in)
- Height: 1,374 mm (54.1 in) (sedan); 1,397 mm (55.0 in) (wagon)
- Kerb weight: 1,345 kg (2,965 lb) (sedan)

Chronology
- Predecessor: Ford Falcon (XC)
- Successor: Ford Falcon (XE)

The Ford Falcon (XD) is a full-size car that was produced by Ford Australia from 1979 to 1982. It was the first iteration of the fourth generation of the Falcon and also included the Ford Fairmont (XD)—the luxury-oriented version.

== Overview ==
The XD Falcon was released in March 1979 replacing the XC Falcon. Its design represented a major gamble by Ford Australia in a time of rising fuel prices; Ford having opted to retain the full-size Falcon platform rather than follow the approach of arch-rival Holden which had replaced its Kingswood large car with the considerably smaller Opel-derived Commodore.

During the 1970s, Ford Australia had evaluated both the European Ford Granada and American Ford Fairmont as options to replace the third-generation Falcon with a smaller, more fuel-efficient car. However, it ruled out both cars based on the costs of adapting them to harsher Australian road conditions and towing requirements, as well as the further cost of developing long-wheelbase luxury variants for the Fairlane and LTD model lines.

Ford had instead chosen to achieve fuel economy improvements with the existing platform through extensive use of lighter materials, including high-strength low-alloy steel for components such as door intrusion bars and wheels, and the innovative use of plastics for components such as bumpers and the fuel tank. Retaining the same wheelbase as the XC, but with a 20-millimetre (0.79 in) increase in front track, the XD featured a new, smaller body with no reduction in interior space, and crisp styling that reduced aerodynamic drag by ten per cent. These changes saw the XD achieve a reduction of 116 kilograms (256 lb) from the weight of the outgoing XC. There was a further 24-kilogram (53 lb) saving on six-cylinder models following a mid-life update in June 1980 that included the introduction of an alloy cylinder head and electronic ignition, with the improved combustion characteristics of the revised engines also contributing to fuel efficiency improvements of seven to ten per cent over comparable earlier XD models equipped with the cast iron head engines. The combination of lightweight components and improved engine design enabled the Falcon to deliver fuel economy comparable to that of the smaller Holden Commodore, an advantage that Ford exploited in its marketing.

Stylistically, the XD was strongly influenced by the European Ford Granada Mark II of 1977, and the two cars are often mistaken to be related, but the only common components shared between the Granada and the Falcon however were the headlights. The one-piece lift-up tailgate for the Falcon station wagon, the first seen on a locally-developed station wagon, was taken directly from the American Ford Fairmont. Unlike its predecessor, the XD range did not include a 2-door Hardtop model.

The base engine offered in the XD range was a 3.3-litre six cylinder engine. Other choices were a 4.1-litre (250 cu in) six cylinder, a 4.9-litre (302 cu in) "Cleveland" eight cylinder and a 5.8-litre (351 cu in) "Cleveland" eight cylinder engine. Transmissions available were a three speed column shift manual for six cylinder versions, the popular four speed manual floor shift, and the most popular transmission choice, the three speed automatic with the selector lever located either on the steering column or the floor. All engines were carburetted. Fuel injection had been considered for the XD but was ruled out on grounds of cost, eventually debuting in the successor XE Falcon.

In 1981, 250 were imported into Trinidad and Tobago by the country's largest Ford dealer.

A total of 197,293 XD Falcons were built prior to the XD being replaced by the XE in March 1982.

== Model range ==
The XD series was offered in five models:

- Falcon GL sedan
- Falcon GL wagon
- Fairmont sedan
- Fairmont wagon
- Fairmont Ghia sedan

Commercial variants of the XD Falcon were released in September 1979 with four models offered:

- Falcon utility
- Falcon van
- Falcon GL utility
- Falcon GL van
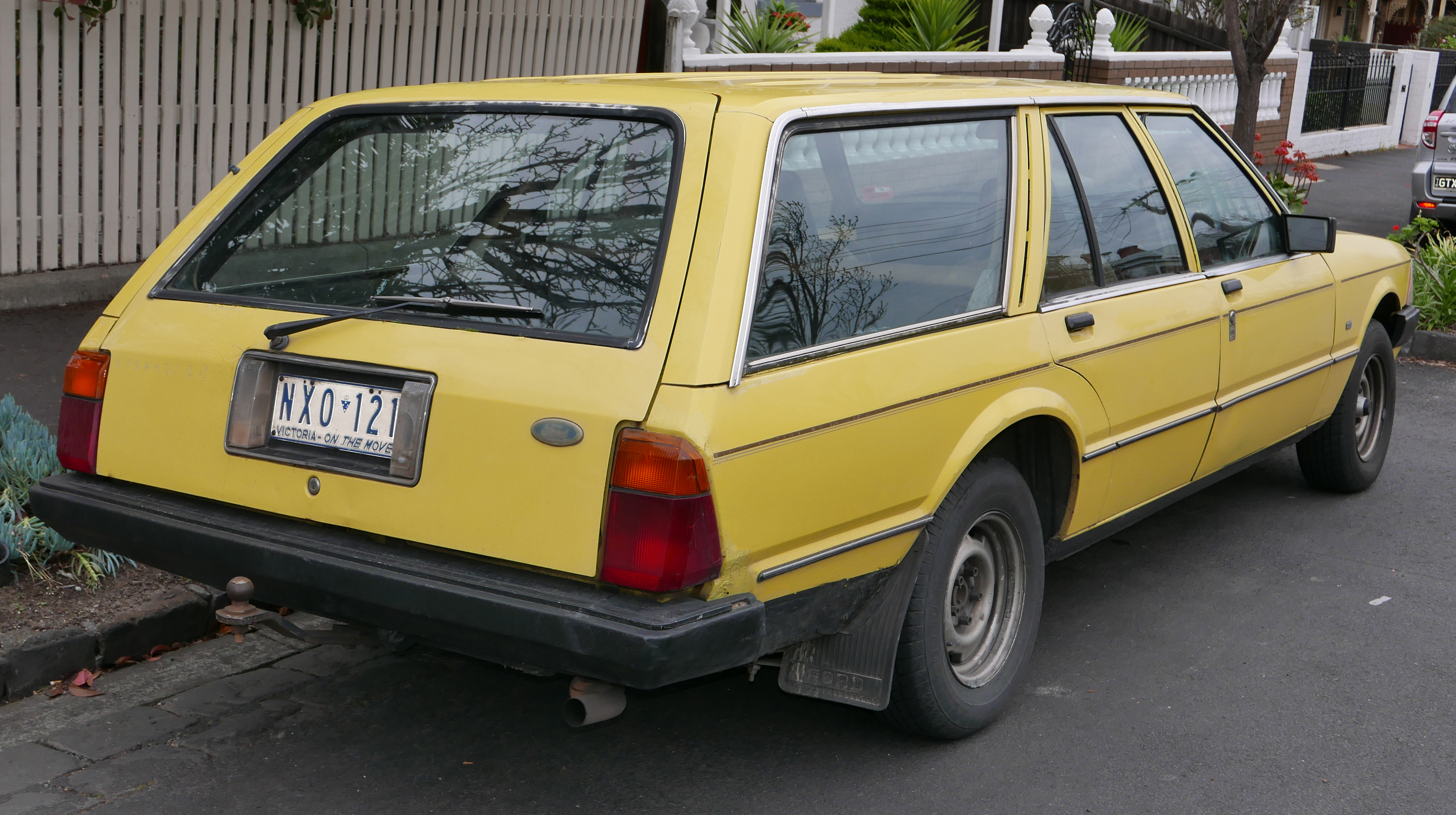
Falcon GL wagon

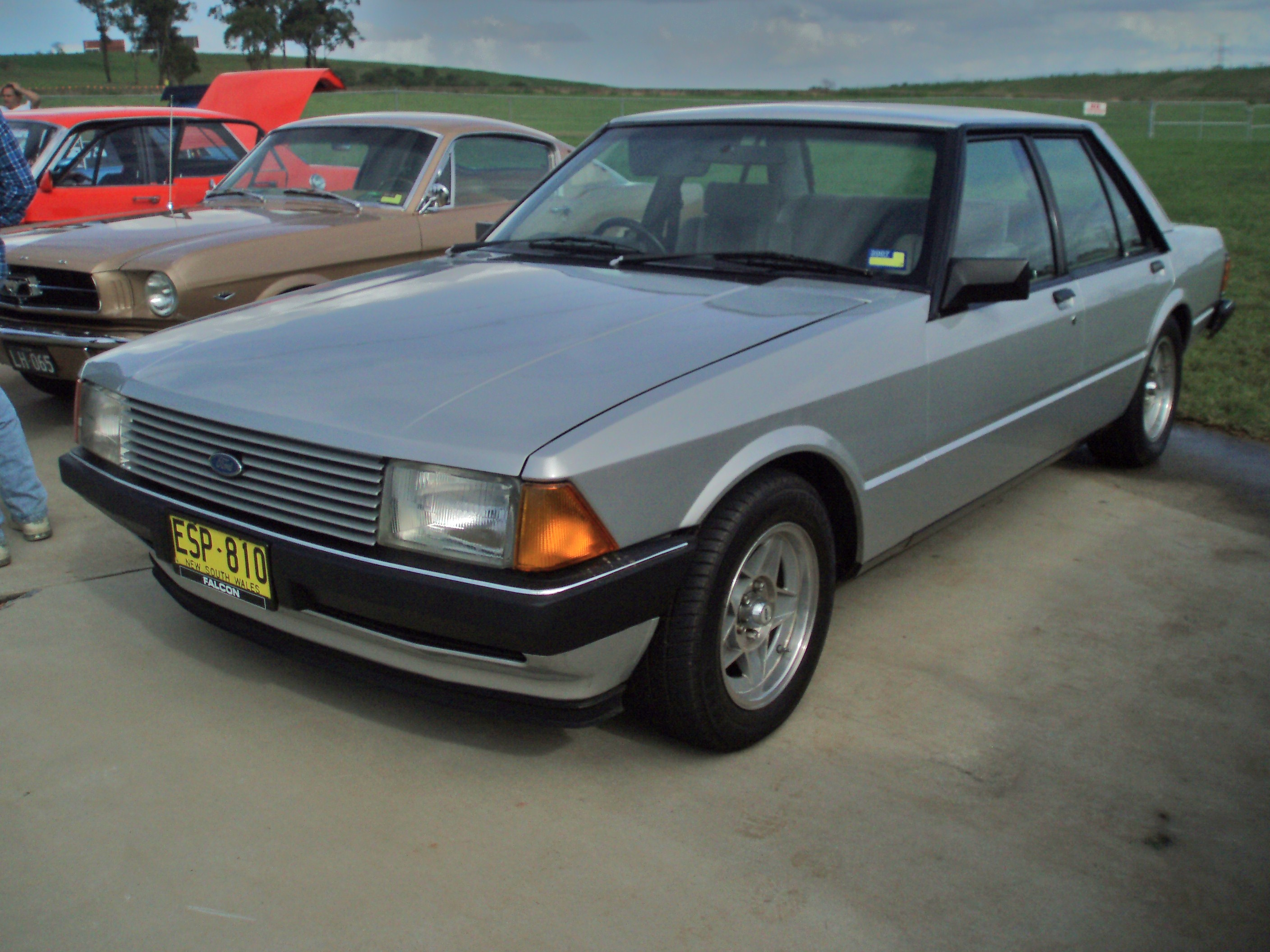
Falcon GL sedan with ESP option

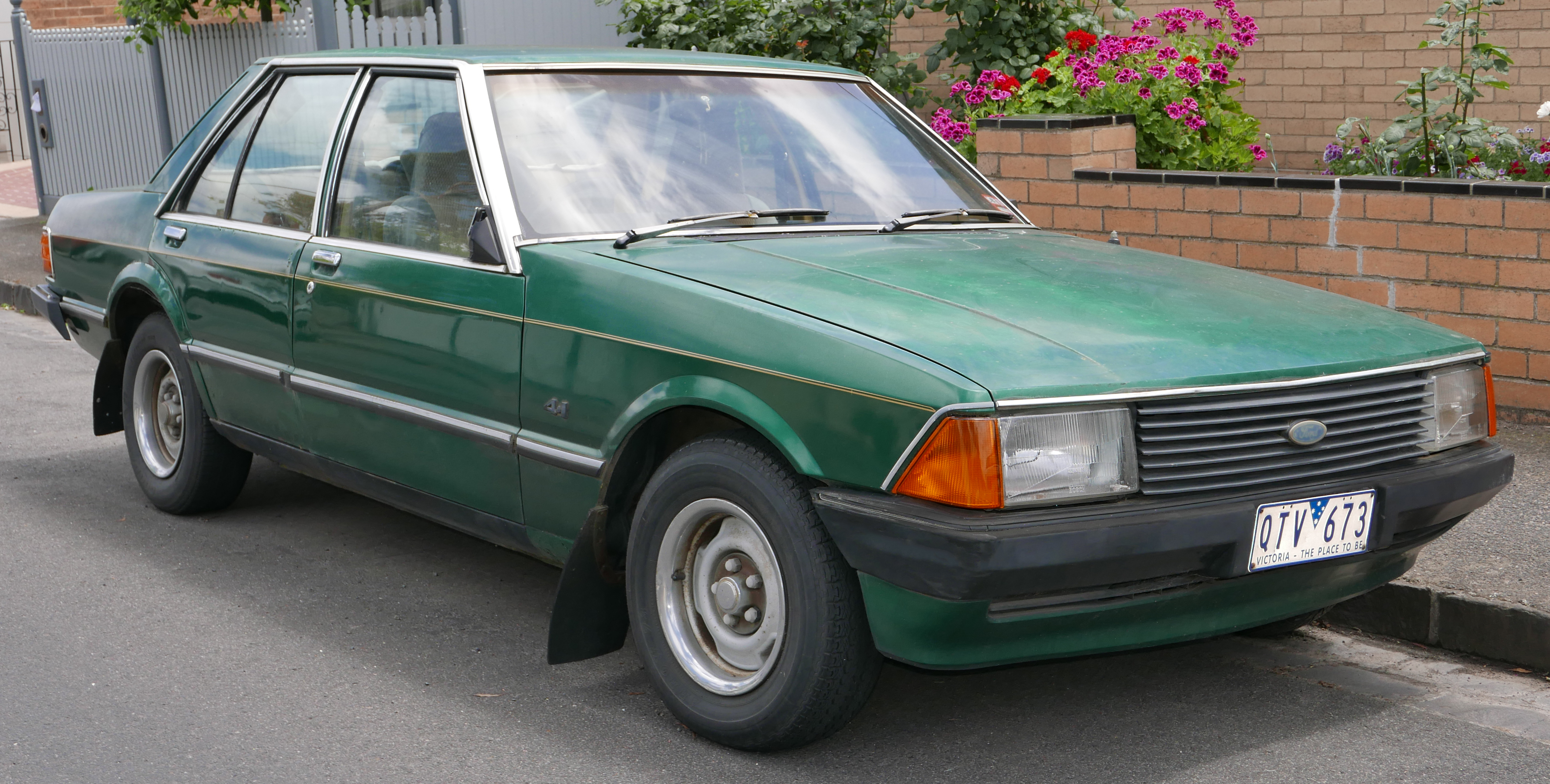
Fairmont sedan

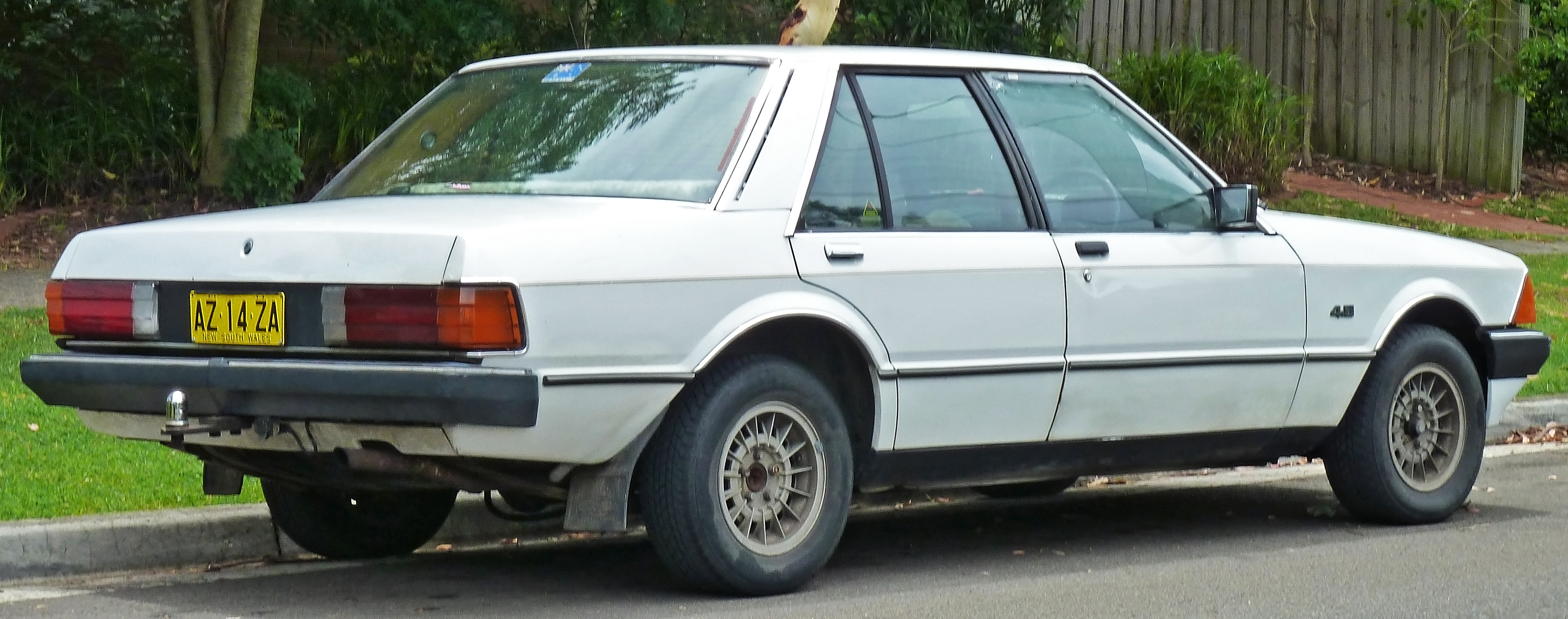
Fairmont Ghia sedan

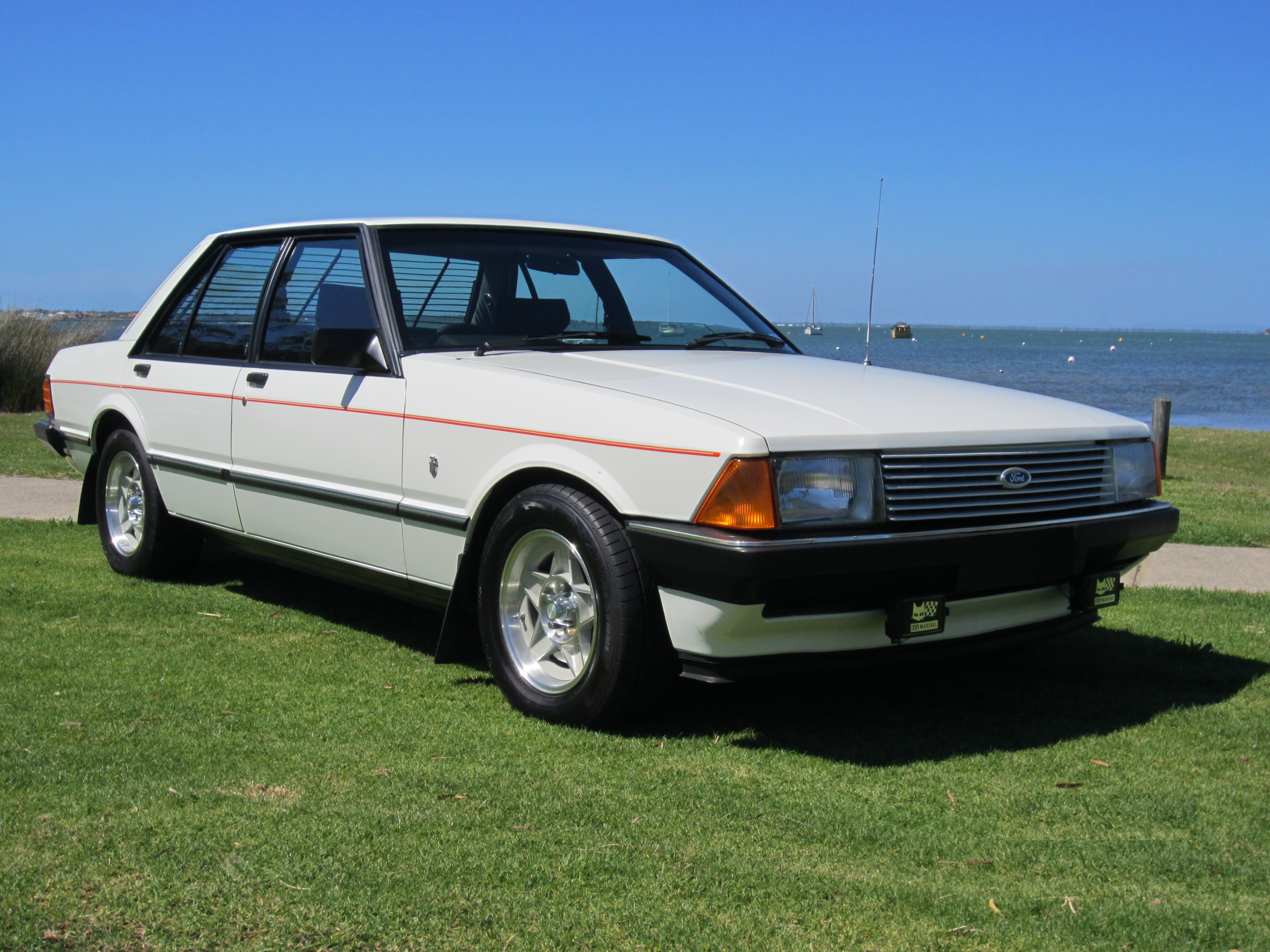
Fairmont Ghia sedan with ESP option

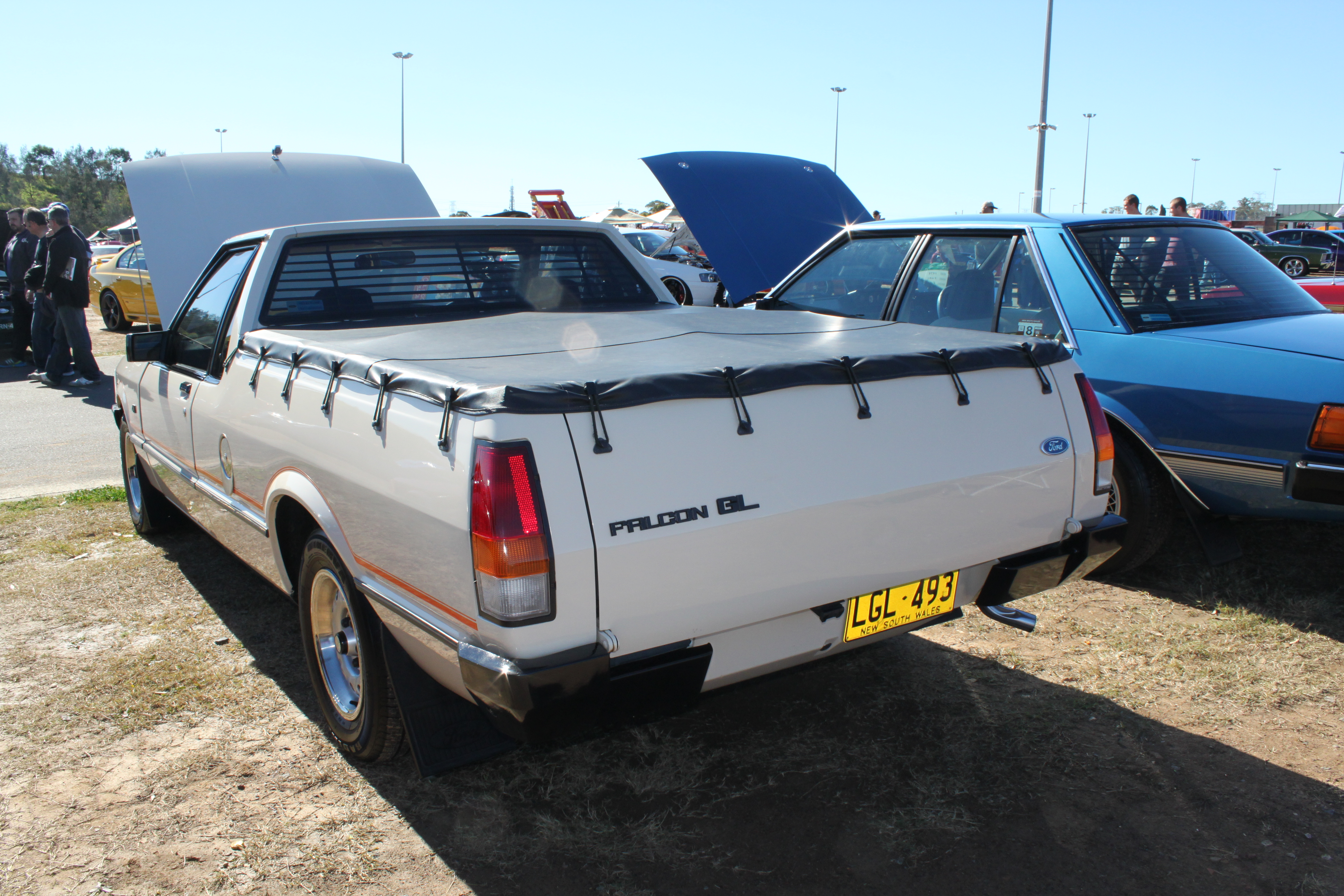
Falcon GL utility (with "S Pack" option)

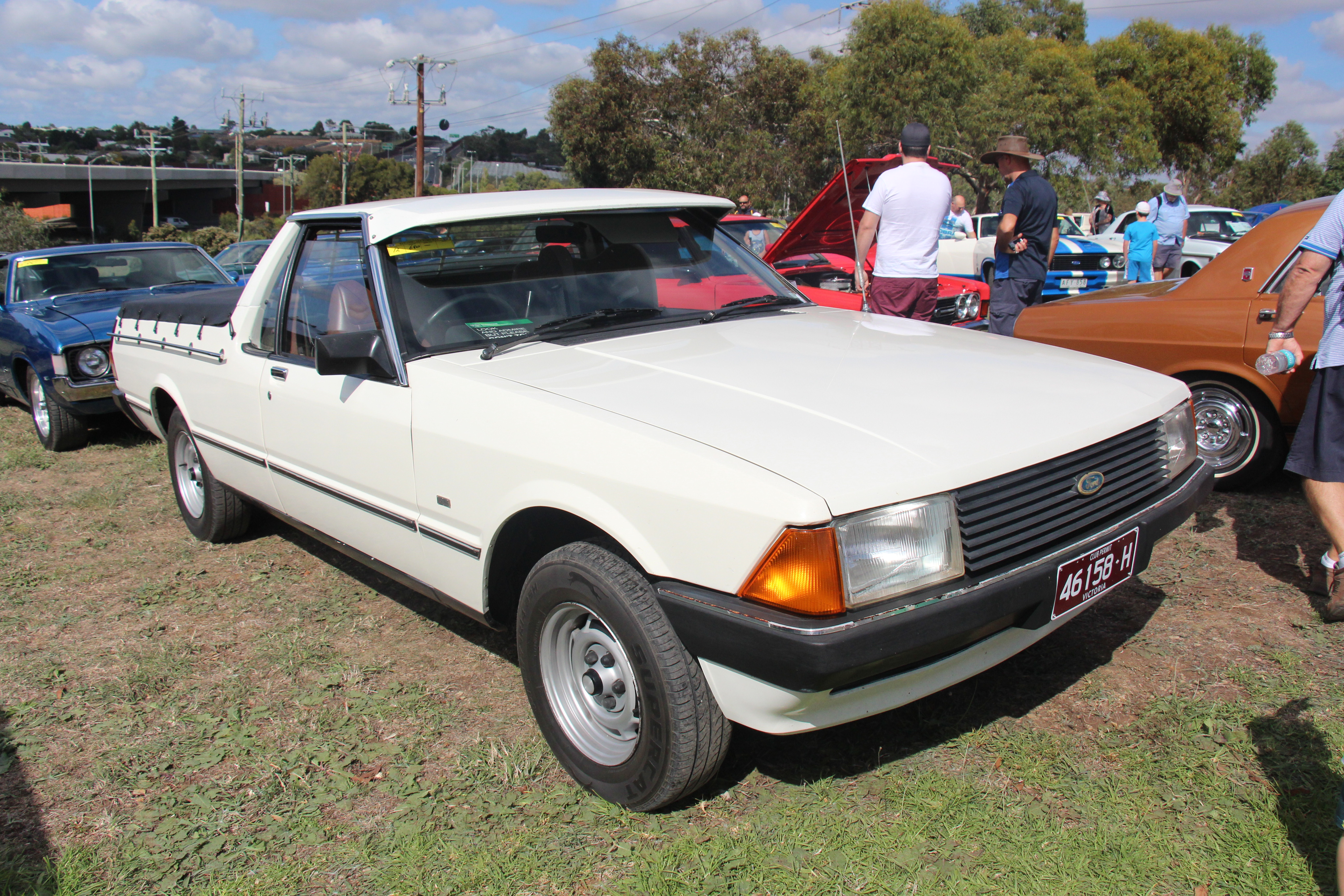
Falcon GL utility

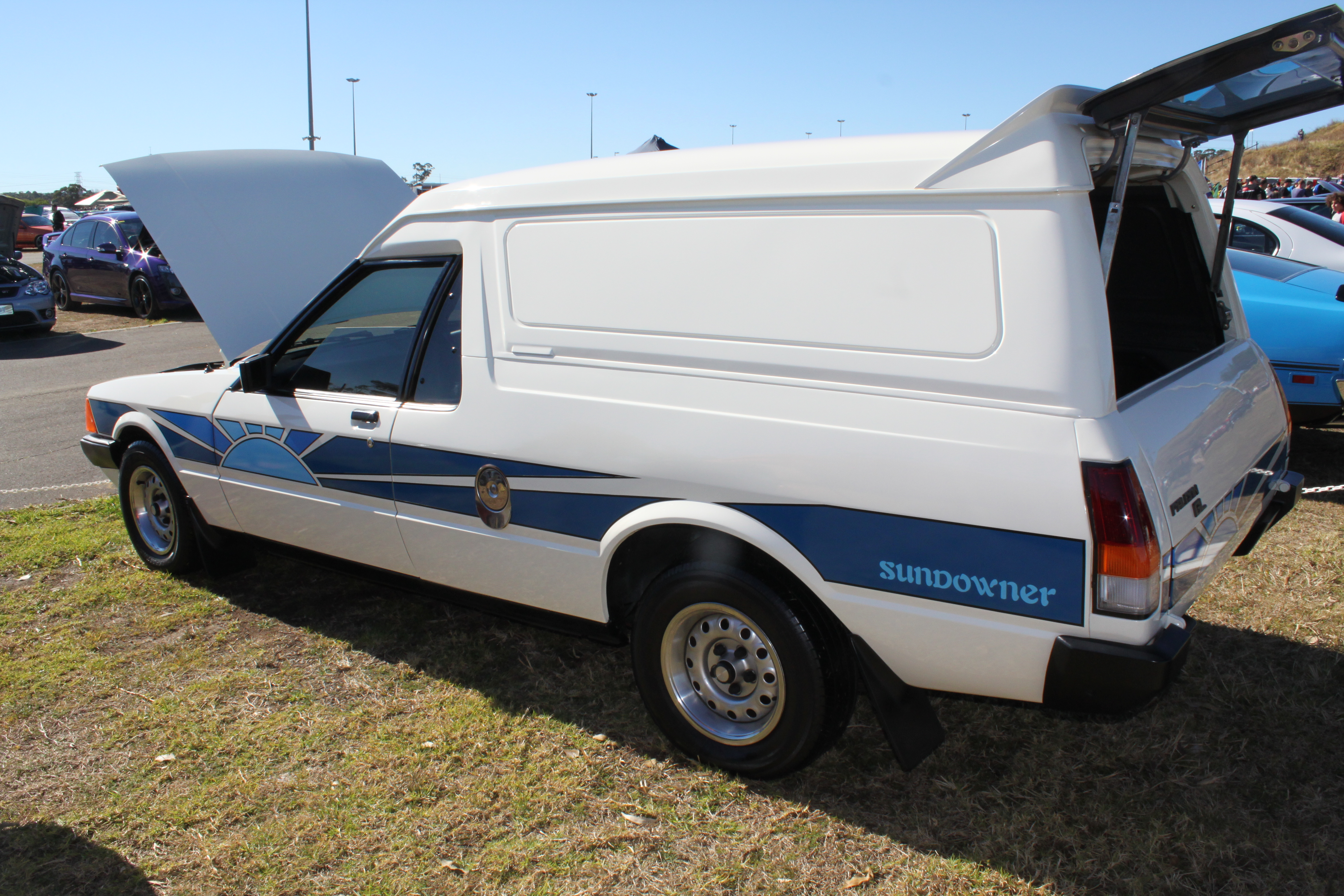
Falcon GL van (with Sundowner option)

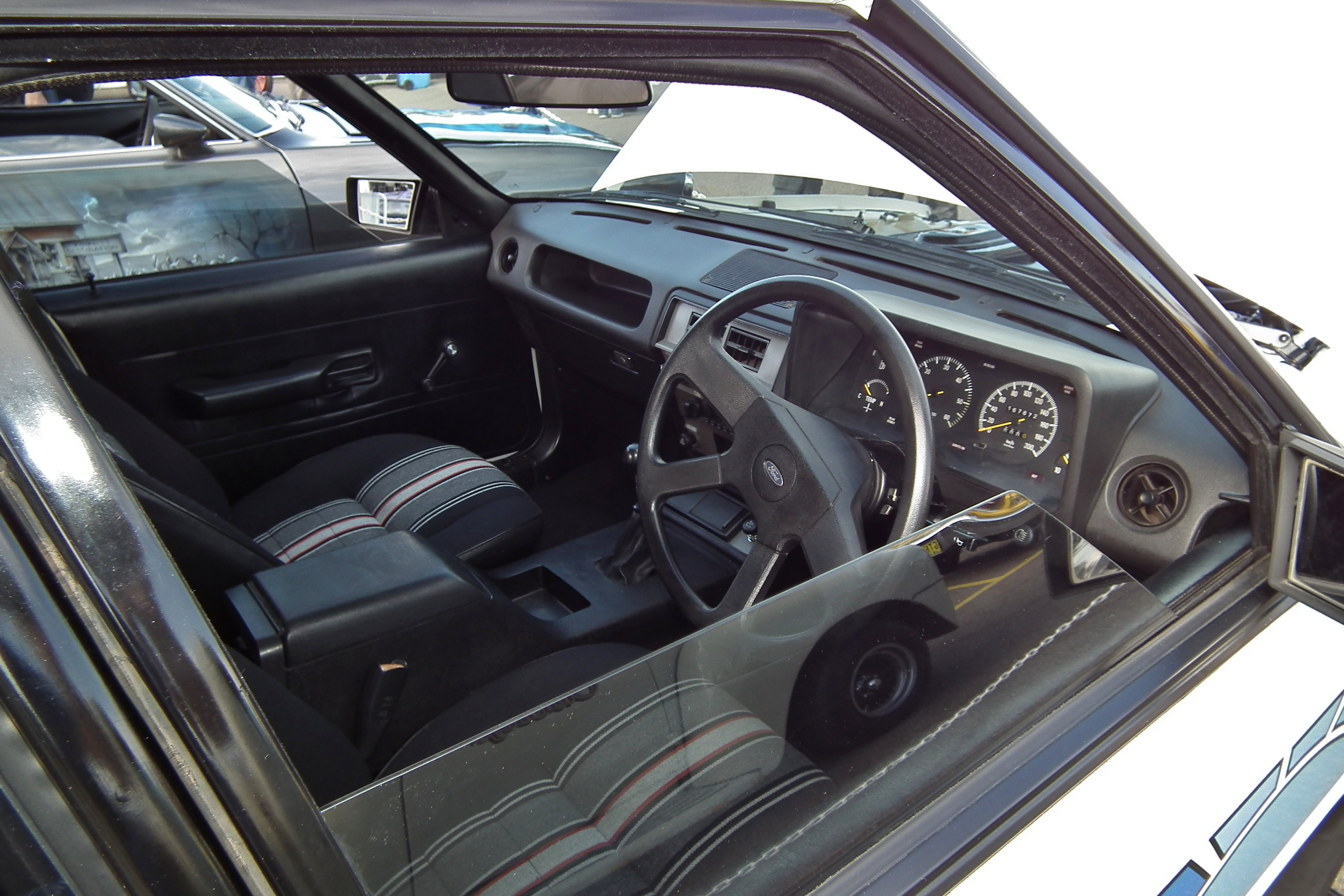
Interior of Falcon GL van (with Sundowner option)

=== S Pack option ===
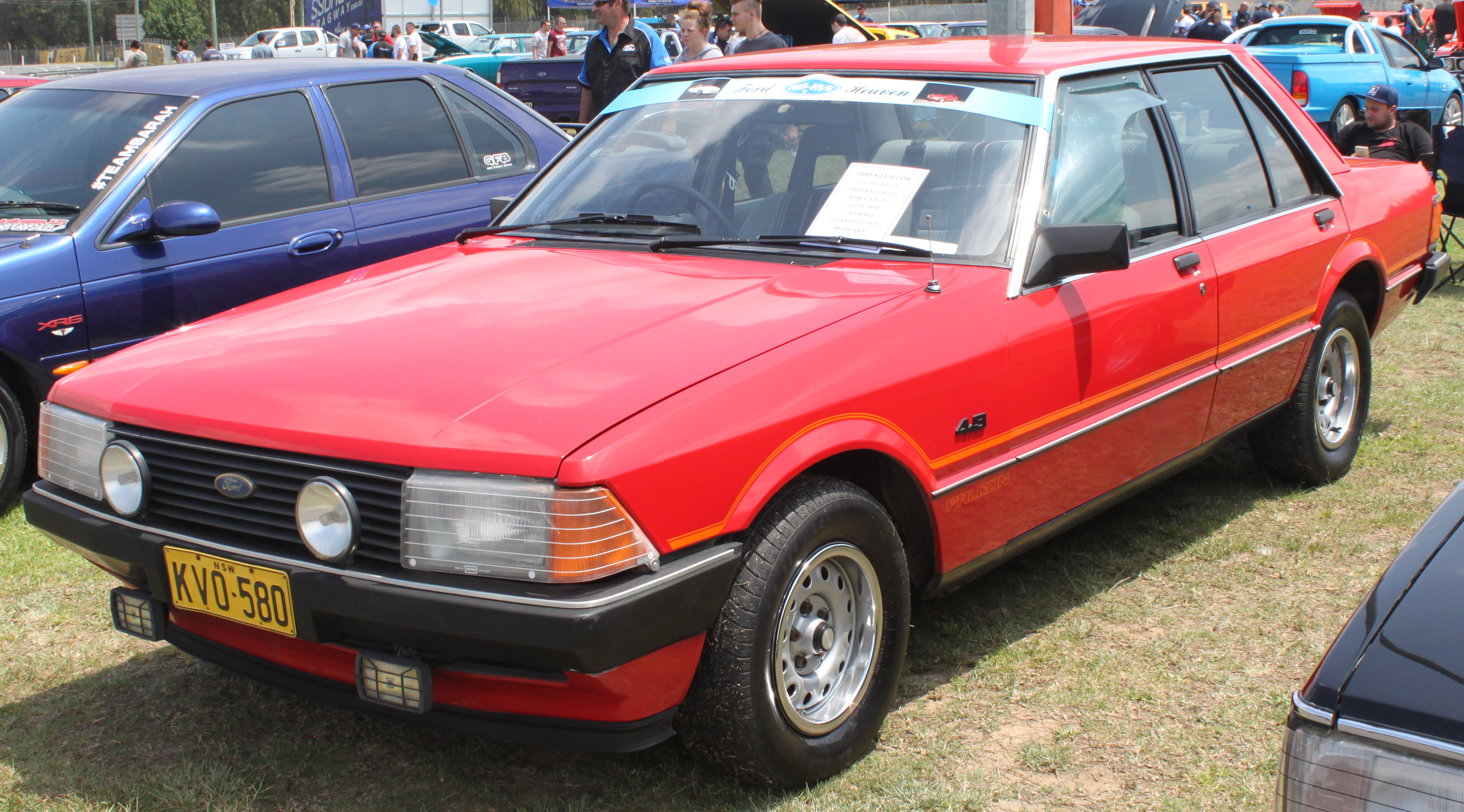
Falcon GL sedan, with S Pack

An "S Pack" option was introduced at launch in March 1979. It included slotted wheels, pinstriping, "S" badging, wool blend cloth trim, digital clock, driving lights, blacked out paint treatments and sports instrumentation which included a tachometer.

=== European Sports Pack (ESP) option ===
A European Sports Pack (ESP), noted as option 54, was introduced in June 1980. It was offered as an option on the Falcon GL Sedan, and included "Bathurst" globe alloy wheels, sports suspension with Bilstein shock absorbers, "Scheel" front seats, red lit instrument panel and clock and the 4.1 litre alloy head six cylinder engine. A European Sports Pack was also offered as an option on the Fairmont Ghia from January 1981.

=== Limited Edition Fairmont Ghia ===
In late 1981, a Limited Edition run of 500 Fairmont Ghias were offered. This limited edition offered distinctive features over and above the high specification already found in the Fairmont Ghia. They were two-tone in colour, with either Galaxy Blue or Dark Burgundy over Aztec Gold paint. The exterior also featured the Marchal fog lights from the ESP and 14-inch "Volante" style alloy wheels made by Globe. The interior borrowed a few luxury items from the larger FC LTD like power seats and a padded centre console. They were available with the 4.1 litre alloy head six cylinder engine and optional V8's.

=== Sundowner van ===
A Sundowner van was offered with standard equipment as in GL van but also including the 4.1-litre engine, four-speed manual floor shift transmission, slotted steel wheels, sports instrumentation, front and rear spoilers, driving lights and exterior striping.

== Motorsport ==
When Ford Australia pulled out of racing in 1973 designer Wayne Draper saw an opportunity to provide Falcon racing teams with aerodynamic kits. He set up an aftermarket body styling company with Bob McWilliam, but remained a silent partner to avoid conflicts with Ford management. Between 1976 and 1978 they produced front splitters and rear spoilers for XB and XC Falcon Hardtop race cars. Draper, who was a Senior Designer for the XD-XF Falcon, purchased the rights to the "HO" nameplate, as "homologated options". Draper then designed an aero kit and tested scale models of an XD Falcon in Ford's wind tunnel. This became known as "XD Phase 5". The Confederation of Australian Motor Sport implemented a few changes (including using Dick Johnson's rear spoiler rather than the Phase 5 wing) to the cars for homologation and HO/Phase Auto then produced the 25 cars required to allow the XD to race as a Group C Touring Car.

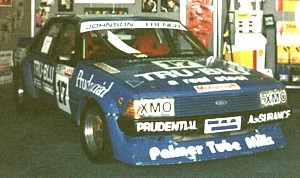
Dick Johnson and John French won the 1981 James Hardie 1000 driving a Ford Falcon (XD)

Dick Johnson drove a 5.8 L (351 cu in) Group C Falcon XD, commonly called "Tru-Blu" (due to the cars blue paint and the name of the steel products from the main sponsor - Palmer Tube Mills), to win the 1981 and 1982 Australian Touring Car Championships. Johnson and co-driver John French also won the 1981 James Hardie 1000 driving an XD when race was stopped after a multi-car accident on lap 121 of 163. For the first time in the history of the Bathurst 1000, the race officials declared the race over as more than 2/3 had been completed. French was driving the car at the time of the accident and was well clear in first place, gradually increasing his lead on the second placed XD Falcon of Bob Morris (co-driver John Fitzpatrick). The Falcon was rated at 306 kW (411 hp) and is now part of the David Bowden collection.

Allan Moffat also raced an XD Falcon in the 1980 Bathurst 1000 when delays in approval of his Mazda RX-7 meant he would have to wait until the following season in 1981. Ford Australia had announced that they would not be taking part in racing due to a disagreement with CAMS over homologating the XD, which left AMR with no program and budget. By the end of the ATCC, Moffat still had no vehicle and it eventuated that he might miss the upcoming Bathurst 1000. Six weeks out from the race, Moffat put together a deal to run a 306 kW (410 hp) yellow XD Falcon. Lack of time limited its development and Moffat had to essentially use the practice sessions at Bathurst to test the car. Recurring oil problems with the dry-sump system could not be eliminated during practice and on race day the vehicle was a DNF after only 2 laps due to the failure of the oil system. This was the last time Ford racing legend Allan Moffat would race a Falcon for many years and the yellow XD is also part of the David Bowden collection along with many of his other racing Falcons.
