= Group C (Australia) =

Two former motorsport categories

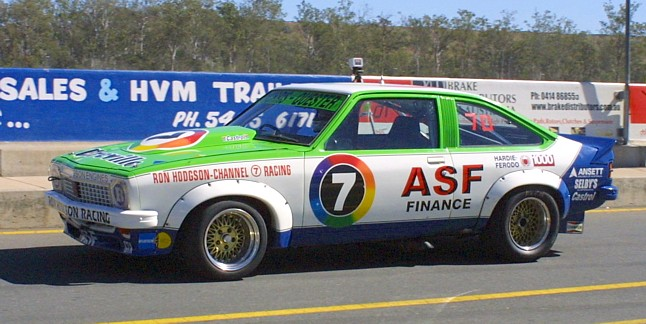
A Group C Holden Torana

In relation to Australian motorsport, Group C refers to either of two sets of regulations devised by the Confederation of Australian Motor Sport (CAMS) for use in Australian Touring Car Racing from 1965 to 1984. These are not to be confused with the FIA's Group C sports car regulations, used from 1982 to 1992 for the World Endurance Championship / World Sports-Prototype Championship / World Sportscar Championship and the 24 Hours of Le Mans.

== History ==
=== Group C Improved Production Touring Cars ===
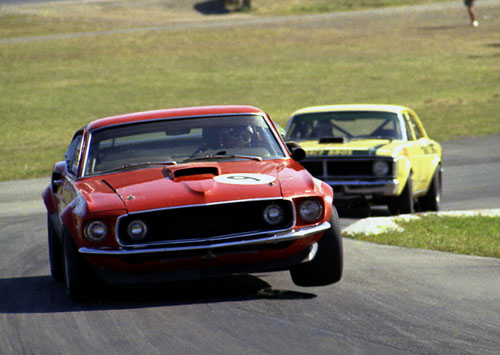
The Ford Mustang Boss 302 Group C Improved Production Touring Car of Allan Moffat leading the Super Falcon of Pete Geoghegan at Lakeside in 1972

Group C Improved Production Touring Car regulations were introduced by CAMS in 1965 to replace the Appendix J rules which had been in force since 1960. The Australian Touring Car Championship was run to these new rules from 1965 to 1972, initially as a single race championship and from 1969 as a multi round series. Group E regulations defining rules for Series Production Touring Car racing in Australia had previously been introduced with effect from 1 January 1964.

The leading cars of the Improved Production era included the Ford Mustang, Chevrolet Nova, Porsche 911S, Holden Monaro HK GTS327, Holden Monaro HT GTS350, Ford Mustang Boss 302, Chevrolet Camaro ZL-1 and the Ford XY Falcon GTHO Phase III.

=== Group C Touring Cars ===
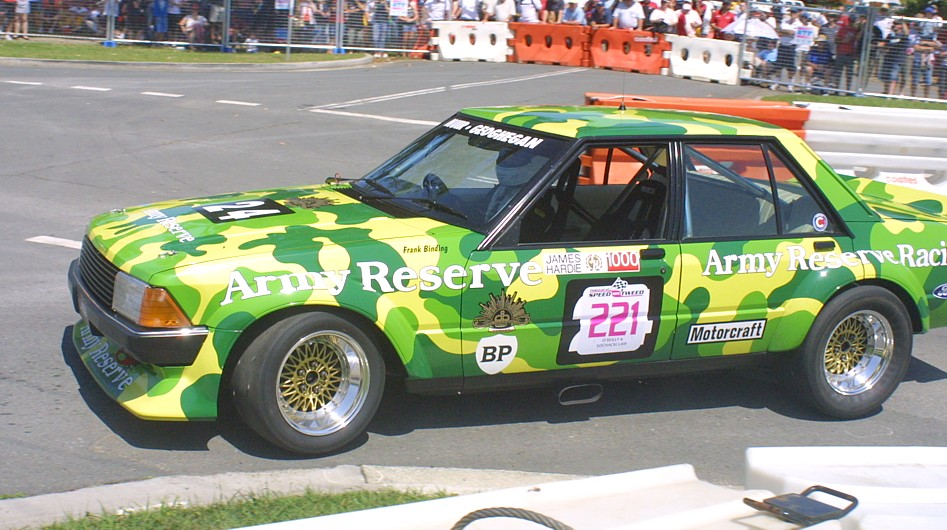
A Group C Ford Falcon

For 1973 CAMS introduced a new Group C Touring Car category to replace both the existing Group C Improved Production and Group E Series Production. The new Group C cars would contest both the Australian Touring Car Championship and the Australian Manufacturers' Championship, the later having previously been contested by Group E cars and run over numerous long-distance events such as the Bathurst 500 and the Sandown enduro. The new Group C classification had been brought about by the media-driven "supercar scare" of 1972 which led to Ford Australia, General Motors Holden and Chrysler Australia ceasing direct involvement with the manufacture of high performance production cars for Group E racing. Holden would continue support of touring car racing until the end of the 1970s. Ford closed their factory team at the end of 1973 and then provided technical and limited financial support of Allan Moffat Racing between 1976 and 1978, but Chrysler ended its involvement at the end of 1972.

The ATCC had expanded to 11 rounds in 1976 and 1977, but the 'Golden Era' often had a thin veneer as uncompetitive small engined cars bolstered entries for many years. The low point saw just nine cars competing for the opening round at Symmons Plains in 1980, though this could be attributed to new CAMS engine emission rules which effectively banned the 1979 Holden Torana hatchback's and Ford Falcons.

The final three seasons of Group C (1982-1984), while seeing more manufacturer involvement from the Japanese with Nissan and Mazda and German marque BMW, were plagued by parity arguments and leading teams and drivers campaigning with officialdom over technical regulations that were increasingly losing touch with the original intent of the class. In mid-1983 CAMS decided that beginning on 1 January 1985 they would replace Group C with new regulations based on FIA's international Group A rules which had been in place in the European Touring Car Championship since 1982, and in New Zealand since 1984.

In addition to the Australian Touring Car Championship, Group C cars also contested the following national title series:

- Australian Manufacturers' Championship, 1973 to 1975
- Australian Championship of Makes, 1976 to 1980
- Australian Endurance Championship, 1981 (this was a manufacturers title)
- Australian Endurance Championship, 1982 to 1984 (this was now a drivers title)
- Australian Endurance Championship of Makes, 1982 to 1984

Group C touring cars also contested the Amaroo Park (Sydney) based AMSCAR series from 1981 to 1984. The series, televised nationally by ATN-7, was restricted to cars with an engine capacity of no more than 3.5 litres in 1981, excluding the outright cars such as the Holden Commodore, Ford Falcon and Chevrolet Camaro and Jaguar XJ-S. After complaints from the mostly Sydney based privateers who ran the outright cars and thus were missing out on potential prize money (with no such series on offer for the outright cars), the restriction was lifted in 1982 and outright cars contested the series to the end of Group C in 1984.

== Class structure ==
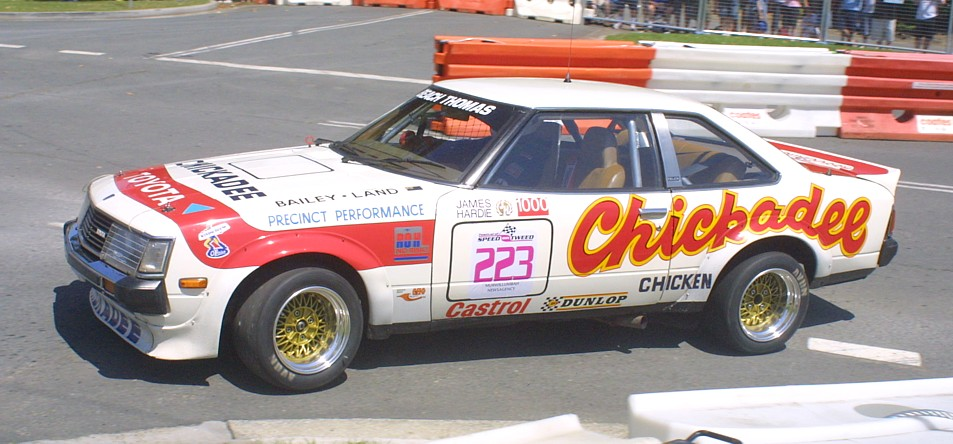
A Group C Toyota Celica

Vehicles were separated into various classes based on engine capacity. The ATCC used a two class system throughout the second Group C era with the field divided into Under 2000cc and Over 2000cc classes from 1973 to 1975 and then into Under 3000cc and Over 3000cc classes from 1976 to 1984. Favourable points structures were used to encourage the smaller cars but it would take until 1986, after the abandonment of Group C, for a small class car to take outright victory in the ATCC.

The Bathurst 1000, as it became in 1973, would change several times, reflecting its roots as a race where four or five individual races held simultaneously with no outright winner promoted. The 1973 version began with cut-offs at 1300cc, 2000cc and 3000cc. For the 1977 race the under 1300cc class was abandoned and a 1600cc class was introduced for the 1979 race. After a one-off cylinder-based system used in 1981, the two smaller classes were removed leaving just under and over 3000c. The capacity based system was abandoned entirely for the final Group C Bathurst race in 1984 with one class for Group C cars and one for the new Group A cars to be raced from 1985.

== Historic Group C Touring Cars ==
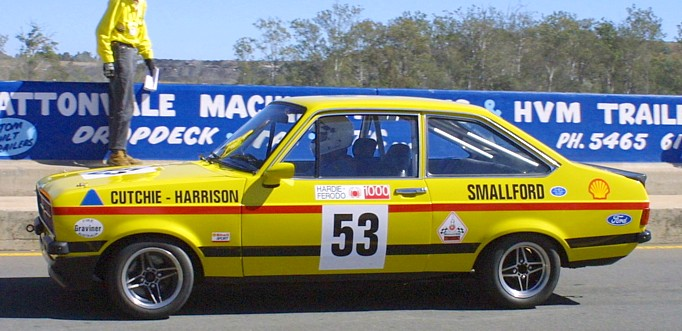
A Group C Ford Escort

An Historic Group C category now caters for vehicles with a competition history in events run to CAMS Group C Touring Car regulations in the period from 1 January 1973 to 31 December 1984. Only actual race vehicles, for which a Group C log book was issued, are eligible.

Group C touring cars feature at historic motor racing festivals, and leading race cars have sold for hundreds of thousands of dollars. A support industry has emerged, including car clubs, magazines, and parts and care products. The Muscle Car Masters, held at Eastern Creek Raceway in Sydney, is the largest race meeting catering to historic touring cars. National Motor Racing Museum, on the outside of Murray's Corner at the Mount Panorama Circuit in Bathurst, holds a collection of historic touring cars.

== List of Group C Touring Cars (1973-1984) ==
- Alfa Romeo GTV6
- Alfa Romeo 2000 GTV
- Alfa Romeo GT 1300 Junior
- BMW 2002
- BMW 3.0Si
- BMW 635 CSi
- Chevrolet Camaro Z28
- Chrysler Valiant Charger R/T E49
- Datsun 1200
- Ford Capri Mk.I
- Ford Capri Mk.II
- Ford Capri Mk.III
- Ford Escort Twin Cam Mk.I
- Ford Escort RS2000 Mk.I
- Ford Escort Mk.II 1.6
- Ford Escort Mk.II 2.0 GL
- Ford Escort Mk.II RS2000
- Ford XA Falcon GT Hardtop
- Ford XB Falcon GT Hardtop
- Ford XC Falcon GS500 Hardtop
- Ford XC Falcon Cobra
- Ford XD Falcon
- Ford XE Falcon
- Ford XY Falcon GTHO Phase III
- Holden VB Commodore
- Holden VC Commodore
- Holden VH Commodore SS
- Holden VK Commodore
- Holden Gemini
- Holden HQ Monaro GTS 350
- Holden LH Torana SL/R 5000
- Holden LH Torana SL/R 5000 L34
- Holden LJ Torana GTR XU-1
- Holden LX Torana SS A9X 4-Door
- Holden LX Torana SS A9X Hatchback
- Isuzu Gemini
- Isuzu Gemini ZZ
- Jaguar XJ-S
- Mazda 323 BD
- Mazda RX-2
- Mazda RX-3
- Mazda RX-7
- Morris Cooper S
- Nissan Bluebird turbo
- Nissan Pulsar EXA
- Toyota Celica
- Toyota Corolla Levin
- Triumph Dolomite Sprint
