= 1985 Australian Touring Car season =

Seasons
- ← 1984 1986 →

The 1985 Australian Touring Car season was the 26th season of touring car racing in Australia commencing from 1960 when the first Australian Touring Car Championship and the first Armstrong 500 (the forerunner of the present day Bathurst 1000) were contested. It was the first season in which Australian Touring Car regulations were based on those for the FIA Group A Touring Car category.

Touring Cars competed at 19 race meetings in Australia during the 1985 season, contesting the following events:

- The ten rounds of the 1985 Australian Touring Car Championship (ATCC)
- The five rounds of the 1985 Australian Endurance Championship (AEC)
- The four rounds of the 1985 AMSCAR series, held exclusively at Amaroo Park. One round was also an ATCC round, one was an AEC round.
- A 15 lap touring car support race at the 1985 Australian Grand Prix meeting at the Adelaide Street Circuit

In 21 races contested in 1985 (including the heats of the AMSCAR series rounds), the JPS Team BMW 635 CSi of Jim Richards won 17 races. This saw him easily win the ATCC, Endurance and AMSCAR titles.

== Race calendar ==
Date	Series	Circuit	City / state	Winner	Team	Car	Report
10 February	ATCC Round 1	Winton Motor Raceway	Benalla, Victoria	Jim Richards	JPS Team BMW	BMW 635 CSi	
24 February	ATCC Round 2	Sandown Raceway	Melbourne, Victoria	Peter Brock	Mobil Holden Dealer Team	Holden VK Commodore	
11 March	ATCC Round 3	Symmons Plains Raceway	Launceston, Tasmania	Robbie Francevic	Mark Petch Motorsport	Volvo 240T	
31 March	ATCC Round 4	Barbagallo Raceway	Perth, Western Australia	Jim Richards	JPS Team BMW	BMW 635 CSi	
7 April	AMSCAR Round 1	Amaroo Park	Sydney, New South Wales	Jim Richards	JPS Team BMW	BMW 635 CSi	
21 April	ATCC Round 4	Adelaide International Raceway	Adelaide, South Australia	Jim Richards	JPS Team BMW	BMW 635 CSi	
28 April	ATCC Round 6	Calder Park Raceway	Melbourne, Victoria	Jim Richards	JPS Team BMW	BMW 635 CSi	
19 May	ATCC Round 7	Surfers Paradise International Raceway	Surfers Paradise, Queensland	Jim Richards	JPS Team BMW	BMW 635 CSi	
28 May	AMSCAR Round 2	Amaroo Park	Sydney, New South Wales	Jim Richards	JPS Team BMW	BMW 635 CSi	
23 June	ATCC Round 8	Lakeside International Raceway	Brisbane, Queensland	Jim Richards	JPS Team BMW	BMW 635 CSi	
7 July	ATCC Round 9 AMSCAR Round 3	Amaroo Park	Sydney, New South Wales	Jim Richards	JPS Team BMW	BMW 635 CSi	
14 July	ATCC Round 10	Oran Park Raceway	Sydney, New South Wales	Robbie Francevic	Mark Petch Motorsport	Volvo 240T	
4 August	Better Brakes 300; AEC Round 1	Amaroo Park	Sydney, New South Wales	Jim Richards	JPS Team BMW	BMW 635 CSi	Report
18 August	Pepsi 250; AEC Round 2	Oran Park Raceway	Sydney, New South Wales	Jim Richards	JPS Team BMW	BMW 635 CSi	
15 September	Castrol 500; AEC Round 3	Sandown Raceway	Melbourne, Victoria	Jim Richards; Tony Longhurst	JPS Team BMW	BMW 635 CSi	report
6 October	James Hardie 1000; AEC Round 4	Mount Panorama Circuit	Bathurst, New South Wales	John Goss; Armin Hahne	JRA Ltd	Jaguar XJ-S	report
27 October	Motorcraft 300; AEC Round 5	Surfers Paradise International Raceway	Surfers Paradise, Queensland	Jim Richards	JPS Team BMW	BMW 635 CSi	
2 November	Australian Grand Prix support race	Adelaide Street Circuit	Adelaide, South Australia	Dick Johnson	Palmer Tube Mills	Ford Mustang GT	

== Australian Grand Prix support race ==
This race was a 15 lap support event at the 1985 Australian Grand Prix meeting.

Pos.	Grid	Driver	No.	Team	Car
1	1	(Australia) Dick Johnson	17	Palmer Tube Mills	Ford Mustang GT
2	3	(Australia) Peter Brock	05	Mobil Holden Dealer Team	Holden VK Commodore
3	4	(Australia) Charlie O'Brien	22	Erle McRae Racing	BMW 635 CSi
4	8	(Australia) Terry Finnigan	40	Terry Finnigan	Holden VK Commodore
5	5	(Australia) Colin Bond	47	Network Alfa / The Toy Shop	Alfa Romeo GTV6
6	7	(Australia) Kevin Bartlett	42	Mitsubishi Ralliart	Mitsubishi Starion Turbo
DNF	2	(Austria) Gerhard Berger	21	Bob Jane T-Marts Racing	BMW 635 CSi
