= 1985 Pepsi 250 =

Layout of the Oran Park Raceway (1985–2010)

The 1985 Pepsi 250 was an endurance race for Group A touring cars held at the Oran Park Raceway in Sydney, New South Wales on 18 August 1985. The race was the second round of the 1985 Australian Endurance Championship. It was held over 100 laps of the 2.620 km (1.628 mi) circuit for a total of 262 km (163 mi).

The field was divided into three classes according to engine displacement.

- Class A : 3001cc to 6000cc
- Class B : 2001cc to 3000cc
- Class C : Up to 2000cc

The JPS Team BMW's golden season continued as Jim Richards drove his BMW 635 CSi to a second straight AEC win after winning the opening round at Amaroo Park. Unlike the 1985 Australian Touring Car Championship and at Amaroo though, Richards did not have it all his own way. The 1 August homologation had seen the Ford Mustang back into winning contention and it was only a broken stub axle on lap 88 that resulted in the car losing a wheel which saw pole sitter and runaway leader Dick Johnson give up his stranglehold on the race (sturdier axle stubs had been homologated for the Mustang and the Palmer Tube Mills team had the new items, but did not have time pre-race to fit them to the car). Richards won the race by a lap from Peter Brock in his Mobil Holden Dealer Team VK Commodore with the Volvo 240T of Robbie Francevic finishing third. Francevic's 3rd place also saw him win Class B.

Dick Johnson showed the benefit of the homologation gain, putting his Mustang on pole with a time of 1:15.1, some 1.2 seconds faster than his pole time at the circuit for the final round of the ATCC just over a month earlier.

== Results ==
Position	Class	No.	Entrant	Drivers	Car	Laps	Grid
1	A	62	JPS Team BMW	(New Zealand) Jim Richards	BMW 635 CSi	100	2
2	A	05	Mobil Holden Dealer Team	(Australia) Peter Brock	Holden VK Commodore	99	5
3	B	21	Mark Petch Motorsport	(New Zealand) Robbie Francevic	Volvo 240T	99	7
4	A	30	Yellow Pages Racing	(Australia) Allan Grice (Australia) Tony Kavich	Holden VK Commodore	98	4
5	A	12	Garry Willmington Performance	(Australia) Garry Willmington	Jaguar XJS	98	8
6	B	27	Network Alfa	(Australia) Colin Bond (Australia) Gregg Hansford	Alfa Romeo GTV6	98	10
7	B	66	Mitsubishi Ralliart	(Australia) Kevin Bartlett (Australia) Peter Fitzgerald	Mitsubishi Starion Turbo	98	9
8	A	3	H. Kent Baigent	(New Zealand) Kent Baigent (New Zealand) Neal Lowe	BMW 635 CSi	98	6
9	A	39		(New Zealand) Graeme Bowkett (New Zealand) Wayne Wilkinson	Holden VK Commodore	97	13
10	B	23	JPS Team BMW	(Australia) Tony Longhurst	BMW 323i	97	16
??	C	10	Toyota Team Australia	(Australia) John Smith	Toyota Corolla		
??	C	13	Bob Holden Motors	(Australia) Bob Holden (Australia) Mike Quinn	Toyota Corolla AE86		23
??	A	36	Lusty Engineering P/L	(Australia) Graham Lusty	Holden VK Commodore		
??	A	14	Auckland - Coin & Bullion Exchange Ltd	(New Zealand) Denny Hulme (New Zealand) Ray Smith	Holden VK Commodore		20
??	A	19	Ken Mathews Prestige Cars	(Australia) Ken Mathews	Holden VK Commodore		17
??	A	33	Mike Burgmann	(Australia) Mike Burgmann	Holden VK Commodore		19
??	A	41	Barry Jones	(Australia) Barry Jones	Holden VK Commodore		33
??	A	37	Brian Callaghan	(Australia) Brian Callaghan	Holden VK Commodore		15
??	A	4	I.M.B. Team Wollongong	(Australia) Peter McLeod	Holden VK Commodore		18
??	A	29	Ken Davison	(Australia) Ken Davison (Australia) Wally Kramer	Ford Mustang GT		29
??	B	65	Hulcraft Autos	(Australia) John Craft	Ford Capri Mk.III		27
??	B		Hulcraft Autos	(Australia) Les Grose	Ford Capri Mk.III		30
??	A	25	Jagparts	(Australia) Gerald Kay	Holden VK Commodore		
DNF	A	17	Palmer Tube Mills	(Australia) Dick Johnson	Ford Mustang GT	88	1
DNF	B	77	Peter Williamson Toyota	(Australia) Peter Williamson	Toyota Celica Supra	15	3
DNF	A	8	Terry Finnigan	(Australia) Terry Finnigan	Holden VK Commodore		
DNF	A	7	Mobil Holden Dealer Team	(Australia) John Harvey	Holden VK Commodore		11
DNF	A	2	Masterton Homes	(Australia) Steve Masterton	Holden VK Commodore		12
DNF	A	27	Alf Grant	(Australia) Alf Grant	Holden VK Commodore		14

* The event had 33 starters

== Notes ==
- Pole Position: #17 Dick Johnson, Ford Mustang - 1:15.1
- Fastest Lap: N/A
- Race Time: 2:12:07.2
