= 1985 Better Brakes 300 =

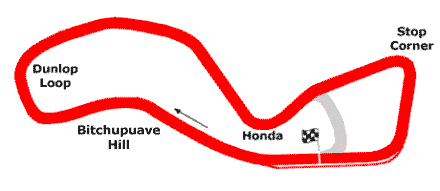
Layout of the Amaroo Park Raceway

The 1985 Better Brakes 300 was an endurance race for Group A touring cars held at the Amaroo Park circuit in Sydney, New South Wales on 4 August 1985. The race was the opening round of the 1985 Australian Endurance Championship. It was held over 155 laps of the tight 1.94 km (1.21 mi) circuit for a total of 300.7 km (186.8 mi).

The field was divided into three classes according to engine displacement.

- Class A : 3001cc to 6000cc
- Class B : 2001cc to 3000cc
- Class C : Up to 2000cc

The race was won by the 1985 Australian Touring Car Champion Jim Richards driving his championship winning JPS Team BMW 635 CSi. Richards won the race by two laps from two more New Zealanders, Kent Baigent and Neal Lowe driving an ex-Schnitzer BMW 635 CSi, with Peter Brock in his Mobil Holden Dealer Team VK Commodore finishing third.

Colin Bond and Gregg Hansford finished 5th outright and 1st in Class B driving the Network Alfa Romeo GTV6 after a race long battle with the JPS BMW 323i of Tony Longhurst. Class C was won by the Team Toyota Australia Corolla of former open wheel star driver John Smith who also finished 7th outright.

One of the pre-race favourites, the Volvo 240T of Kiwi Robbie Francevic was out before the race started as the left front wheel parted company with the car on the formation lap going through Suttons Corner. At the end of the first of two formation / warm up laps, the Mark Petch Motorsport team had done a practice pit stop. The car came down off the jacks and Robbie was waved out of the pits, unfortunately before the left front centre-lock wheel nut had been tightened.

Allan Grice, having his first ever Group A start driving in The Toy Shop Alfa GTV6, was out after just three laps with gearbox failure. The Alfa was the original Network Alfa raced by his 1983 Bathurst co-driver Colin Bond in both Group E Series Production and later Group A before Bond sold it to The Toy Shop outfit in Sydney

Richards qualified on pole for the race with a time of 53.80 seconds. Peter Brock, debuting the newly homologated (just 3 days earlier) 4.9L Commodore (which also came with a weight reduction of 75 kg (165.3 lb) to bring the Commodore down to 1,325 kg (2,921.1 lb)), qualified in 2nd spot.

== Results ==
Position	Class	No.	Entrant	Drivers	Car	Laps	Grid
1	A	62	JPS Team BMW	(New Zealand) Jim Richards	BMW 635 CSi	155	1
2	A	3	H. Kent Baigent	(New Zealand) Kent Baigent (New Zealand) Neal Lowe	BMW 635 CSi	153	8
3	A	05	Mobil Holden Dealer Team	(Australia) Peter Brock	Holden VK Commodore	153	2
4	A	7	Mobil Holden Dealer Team	(Australia) David Parsons (Australia) John Harvey	Holden VK Commodore	153	10
5	B	27	Network Alfa	(Australia) Colin Bond (Australia) Gregg Hansford	Alfa Romeo GTV6	153	5
6	B	23	JPS Team BMW	(Australia) Tony Longhurst	BMW 323i	152	9
7	C	10	Toyota Team Australia	(Australia) John Smith	Toyota Corolla	148	11
8	A	19	Ken Mathews Prestige Cars	(Australia) Ken Mathews (Australia) Terry Finnigan	Holden VK Commodore	147	14
9	A	33	Mike Bergmann	(Australia) Mike Bergmann (Australia) Bob Stevens	Holden VK Commodore	144	17
10	A	24	Jagparts	(Australia) Gerald Kay (Australia) Don Bretland	Holden VK Commodore	144	16
??	A	30	Yellow Pages	(Australia) Tony Kavich (Australia) Ralph Radburn	Holden VK Commodore		13
??	A			(Australia) Bernie McClure	Holden VK Commodore		
??	A	39		(New Zealand) Graeme Bowkett (New Zealand) Wayne Wilkinson	Holden VK Commodore		15
??	B	39	Chris Heyer	(Australia) Chris Heyer	Audi 5+5		19
??	C	13	Bob Holden Motors	(Australia) Bob Holden (Australia) Mike Quinn	Toyota Corolla AE86		12
??	C	11	Toyota Team Australia	(Australia) Drew Price	Toyota Corolla AE86		18
??	B	65	Hulcraft Autos	(Australia) John Craft	Ford Capri Mk.III		20
??	B		Hulcraft Autos	(Australia) Les Grose	Ford Capri Mk.III		22
??	A	29	Ken Davison	(Australia) Ken Davison	Ford Mustang		24
??	A	28	Capri Components	(Australia) Lawrie Nelson	Ford Mustang		21
DNF	A	2	Masterton Homes	(Australia) Steve Masterton	Holden VK Commodore		6
DNF	B	77	Peter Williamson Toyota	(Australia) Peter Williamson (Australia) Charlie O'Brien	Toyota Supra	7	4
DNF	B	26	The Toy Shop	(Australia) Allan Grice	Alfa Romeo GTV6	3	7
DNS	B	21	Mark Petch Motorsport	(New Zealand) Robbie Francevic	Volvo 240T		3

* The event attracted 24 starters.

== Notes ==
- Pole Position: #1 Jim Richards, BMW 635 CSi - 0:53.80
- Fastest Lap: #1 Jim Richards, BMW 635 CSi - 0:55.11
- Race Time: 2:28:08.6

== See also ==
- Australian Motor Racing Year, 1985/86
- James Hardie 1000, 1985/86
- The Australian Racing History of Ford, 1989
- The Official Racing History of Holden, 1988
