= Mike Burgmann =

Australian racing driver (1947–86)

Michael Burgmann
- Nationality: Australian
- Born: 3 June 1947 Sydney, NSW, Australia
- Died: 5 October 1986 (aged 39) Bathurst, NSW, Australia

Australian Touring Car Championship
- Years active: 1982–1986
- Starts: 3
- Best finish: 27th in 1986 Australian Touring Car Championship

Michael Trevor Burgmann (3 June 1947 – 5 October 1986) was a Sydney accountant and racing car driver who was involved in a fatal accident at the 1986 James Hardie 1000 race held at the Mount Panorama Circuit in Bathurst, New South Wales. At the time of his death, Burgmann was the accountant for the Australian Racing Drivers Club (ARDC), who were the promoters of the Bathurst 1000, as well as the owners and promoters of Amaroo Park in Sydney.

== Career ==
After driving mostly in the Amaroo Park based "AMSCAR Series" in 1983, as well as appearing in the Sydney rounds of the ATCC and Australian Endurance Championship, Burgmann made his first Bathurst start in 1983 driving an ex-Kevin Bartlett Chevrolet Camaro with fellow Bathurst rookie (and future dual Great Race winner) Tony Longhurst. After qualifying the big Chev in 21st, the car suffered numerous problems on race day and the pair only finished 121 of the 163 laps which was not enough to be classified as a finisher.

Burgmann spent 1984 again as a regular competitor in the AMSCAR series. The 1984 James Hardie 1000 was much better for Mike Burgmann, switching to race a Mazda RX-7 (having sold the Camaro to Victorian based GT/Sports Sedan racer Bryan Thomson), and co-driving with veteran Bob Stevens after Longhurst had moved to the JPS Team BMW. The #33 Mazda was qualified in 39th position, almost ten seconds slower than the pole time set by Nissan driver George Fury. The team remained confident of a good result though, and through consistent laps without any major problems they finished a successful eighth, only ten laps down on the winning Holden Dealer Team Holden Commodore VK of Peter Brock and Larry Perkins.

With Australian touring car racing switching from the local Group C rules to the International Group A regulations in 1985, and with the RX-7 no longer a competitive option, he bought a Holden VK Commodore to compete in at the 1985 and 1986 Bathurst 1000's. The 1985 race saw a DNF after only 93 laps with engine failure, a common problem with the near standard Commodores used during 1985.

== 1986 race and death ==
For 1986, and like everyone else who ran the Holdens, the Burgmann team had upgraded the Commodore to the racing SS Group A specification. For the Endurance Championship he co-drove the car with Series Production racer Mal Rose. At Bathurst Burgmann qualified the car in 27th place. After a good start in which he'd already picked up almost ten places, he suffered a broken windscreen on lap 3. On lap 5, Burgmann was attempting to pass the V12 Jaguar XJS of fellow Sydney racer and close friend Garry Willmington while coming over the second hump on Conrod Straight and traveling at over 260 km/h (162 mph). The front of the Commodore got airborne (as cars did coming over the hump at that speed) and the front moved slightly to the left. Burgmann, who was only a part-time racer, tried to correct by turning the wheel to the right. The car then hit the tire barrier at the bottom of the well-known curved bridge at the end of Conrod with unabated speed causing the entire front end to be pushed back to the firewall. The car's roll cage did its job and the cabin survived the violent impact mostly intact. When officials reached the car they found Burgmann in what would normally be the back seat of the vehicle. While his driving seat had remained intact the force of the impact had broken the seat belt buckle which caused his body to be thrown out of the seat. Burgmann became the first driver to die while competing in the Bathurst 1000 when he was pronounced dead on arrival at Bathurst Hospital.

== Legacy ==
Following the 1986 race, and as part of safety upgrades the circuit needed to bring it up to FIA standards for inclusion in the 1987 World Touring Car Championship, a chicane was added to Conrod Straight, eliminating the second hump which had long been seen as dangerous at the speeds the touring cars were traveling (the V12 Jaguar XJS of Tom Walkinshaw was timed at a then fastest ever 290 km/h (180 mph) on the straight during qualifying for the 1984 race). The Chase was also constructed due to FIA regulations that did not allow race tracks with an international rating (as Bathurst was forced to have from 1987) to have any straight longer than 1.5 km. Prior to 1987, Conrod Straight's length was 2 km.

Before his death, Burgmann was also one of the prime movers behind the upgrading of the old pits at the Mount Panorama Circuit. Prior to the WTCC in 1987, the Bathurst pits were among the worst for any major race circuit in the world, having been in place since the 1960s. Following the 1986 race, the old pits were torn down and a new international standard complex was built in its place. The new pits included a wider apron, 15m x 15m pit bays, a new press area, VIP suites above the pits, and a new building to house the race officials. The pits also now ran almost the entire length of the pit straight, giving more room for all of the cars to be in the pits at one time. New garages were also built in the paddock area.

On the day before the 1987 James Hardie 1000, a plaque inset on the wall at the spot that his car had come to rest was unveiled by motor racing Chaplain Garry Coleman. The ceremony was attended by Burgmann's widow, Gaye.

The inscription on the plaque reads:

In memory of Mike Burgmann who was tragically killed at this spot on 5 October 1986

As a result of the accident and the subsequent building of The Chase, the race cars now approach the pedestrian bridge approximately 100 km/h (62 mph) less than was possible in 1986.

Michael Burgmann left behind his wife Gaye and four young children and extended family.

== Career results ==
Sourced from Driver Database

Season	Series	Position	Car	Team
1983	Australian Endurance Championship	65th	Chevrolet Camaro Z28	Mike Burgmann
1983	AMSCAR Series	9th	Chevrolet Camaro Z28	Mike Burgmann
1984	AMSCAR Series	7th	Mazda RX-7	Mike Burgmann
1984	Australian Touring Car Championship	30th	Mazda RX-7	Mike Burgmann
1984	Australian Endurance Championship	11th	Mazda RX-7	Mike Burgmann
1985	Australian Endurance Championship	66th	Holden VK Commodore	Mike Burgmann
1986	Australian Touring Car Championship	30th	Holden VK Commodore SS Group A	Mike Burgmann
1986	Australian Endurance Championship	46th	Holden VK Commodore SS Group A	Mike Burgmann

=== Complete Bathurst 1000 results ===
Year	Team	Co-drivers	Car	Class	Laps	Pos.	Class pos.
1983	(Australia) Dreamworld	(Australia) Tony Longhurst	Chevrolet Camaro Z28	A	121	DNF	DNF
1984	(Australia) Michael Burgmann	(Australia) Bob Stevens	Mazda RX-7	Group C	153	8th	8th
1985	(Australia) Michael Burgmann	(Australia) Bob Stevens	Holden VK Commodore	C	93	DNF	DNF
1986	(Australia) Michael Burgmann	(Australia) Mal Rose	Holden VK Commodore SS Group A	C	5	DNF	DNF
