= 1985 Castrol 500 =

Endurance race

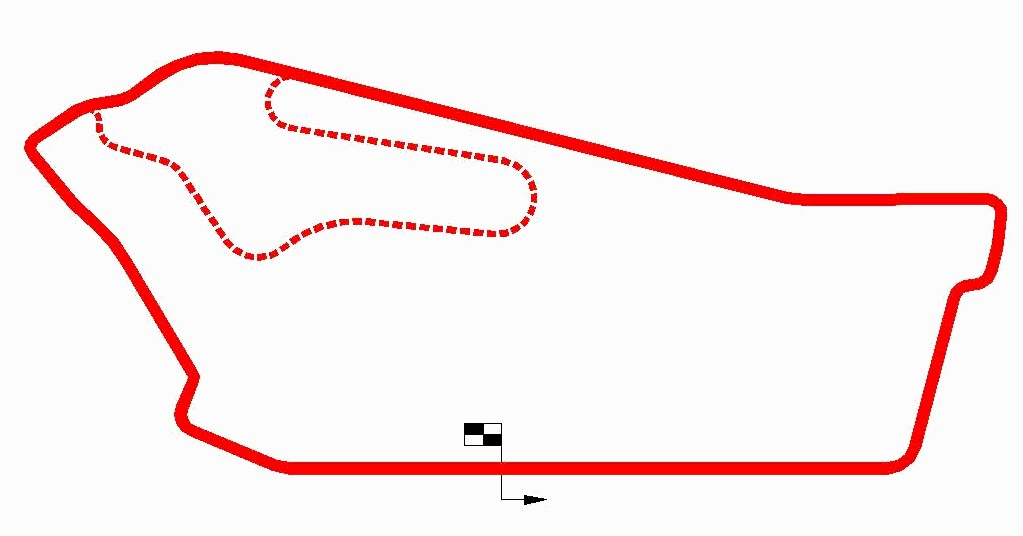
Layout of the Sandown Raceway international circuit (1984-1998)

The 1985 Castrol 500 was an endurance race for "Group A" Touring Cars staged at the Sandown International Motor Racing Circuit in Victoria on 15 September 1985. Race distance was 129 laps of the 3.878 km (1.928 mi) circuit, totaling 500.262 km.

The event was Round 3 of both the 1985 Australian Endurance Championship and the 1985 Australian Manufacturers' Championship. There were 36 starters, of which 21 were classified as finishers.

The race was won by the JPS Team BMW 635 CSi of Australian Touring Car Champion Jim Richards, and his co-driver Tony Longhurst. It was Longhurst's first major win in Australian touring car racing. JPS Team BMW made it a 1-2 finish when their second car, driven by Neville Crichton and on-loan Nissan team driver George Fury finished only a few seconds behind. Finishing in third place was the surprising Toyota Supra of Peter Williamson and 1985 Motorcraft Formula Ford Driver to Europe Series winner Tomas Mezera.

The 1985 Castrol 500 was the first time since 1972 that neither Peter Brock or Allan Moffat had won the Sandown enduro. 1984 Castrol 500 winner Brock, who claimed pole position with a time of 1:52.3 in his Holden Dealer Team VK Commodore SS, suffered engine failure after 41 laps, while Moffat, who was without a drive in 1985 due to Mazda not racing in Group A, was part of the ABC television commentary team.

== Classes ==
The field was divided into three classes according to engine displacement.

- Class A : 3001 cc to 6000 cc
- Class B : 2001 cc to 3000 cc
- Class C : Up to 2000 cc

== Results ==
=== Top 10 Qualifiers ===
Pos	No.	Entrant	Driver	Car	Time
Pole	05	Mobil Holden Dealer Team	(Australia) Peter Brock	Holden VK Commodore SS	1:52.3
2	6	Roadways Racing Services	(Australia) Allan Grice	Holden VK Commodore SS	1:52.4
3	17	Palmer Tube Mills	(Australia) Dick Johnson	Ford Mustang GT	1:52.4
4	1	JPS Team BMW	(New Zealand) Jim Richards	BMW 635 CSi	1:52.7
5	55	Mark Petch	(New Zealand) Robbie Francevic	Volvo 240T	1:52.9
6	43	Mitsubishi Ralliart	(Australia) Peter Fitzgerald	Mitsubishi Starion turbo	1:53.3
7	7	Mobil Holden Dealer Team	(Australia) John Harvey	Holden VK Commodore SS	1:53.7
8	42	Mitsubishi Ralliart	(Australia) Kevin Bartlett	Mitsubishi Starion turbo	1:54.4
9	31	JPS Team BMW	(Australia) George Fury	BMW 635 CSi	1:54.4
10	3	K. Baigent	(New Zealand) Neal Lowe	BMW 635 CSi	1:54.4

=== Race ===
Position	Class	No.	Entrant	Drivers	Car	Laps
1	A	1	JPS Team BMW	(New Zealand) Jim Richards (Australia) Tony Longhurst	BMW 635 CSi	129
2	A	31	JPS Team BMW	(New Zealand) Neville Crichton (Australia) George Fury	BMW 635 CSi	129
3	B	44	Peter Williamson Toyota	(Australia) Peter Williamson (Australia) Tomas Mezera	Toyota Supra	127
4	B	47	Network Alfa	(Australia) Colin Bond (Australia) Gregg Hansford	Alfa Romeo GTV6	126
5	A	36	Lusty Engineering Pty Ltd	(Australia) Graham Lusty (Australia) Ken Lusty	Holden VK Commodore SS	123
6	A	39	Sleepy Head Bedding Co.	(New Zealand) Graeme Bowkett (New Zealand) Wayne Wilkinson	Holden VK Commodore SS	123
7	A	14	Auckland Coin & Bullion Exchange Co.	(New Zealand) Denny Hulme (Australia) Ray Smith	Holden VK Commodore SS	121
8	A	13	Grellis Marketing	(Australia) Ray Ellis (Australia) Bernie McLure	Holden VK Commodore SS	120
9	C	61	Toyota Team Australia	(Australia) Ray Cutchie (New Zealand) John Faulkner	Toyota Sprinter	115
10	C	57	Bob Holden Motors	(Australia) Bob Holden (New Zealand) Glenn Clark	Toyota Sprinter	115
11	C	58	Bob Holden Motors	(Australia) David Ratcliffe (Australia) Don Smith	Toyota Sprinter	114
12	C	88	J. White	(Australia) John White (Australia) Les Szreniawski	Isuzu Gemini ZZ	112
13	B	45	Alfa City	(Australia) Ray Gulson (Australia) Frank Porter	Alfa Romeo GTV6	111
14	B	53	Hulcraft Auto	(Australia) John Craft (Australia) Les Grose	Ford Capri	107
15	B	52	Hulcraft Auto	(Australia) Pat Hogbin (Australia) John Hogbin	Ford Capri	102
16	C	64	K. Harrison	(Australia) Ken Harrison (Australia) Ian Wells	Ford Escort	100
17	B	42	Mitsubishi Ralliart	(Australia) Kevin Bartlett (Australia) Peter McKay	Mitsubishi Starion turbo	100
18	B	50	J. L. Hazelton	(Australia) Laurie Hazelton (Australia) Jerry Stauberg	Ford Capri	100
19	A	17	Palmer Tube Mills	(Australia) Dick Johnson (Australia) Larry Perkins	Ford Mustang GT	92
20	C	66	Jagparts Racing	(Australia) Lorraine Orchard (Australia) Paul Taylor	Triumph Dolomite	84
21	B	54	Melbourne Clutch & Brake Service	(Australia) Brian Sampson (Australia) Garry Waldon	Mitsubishi Starion turbo	51
DNF	A	41	B. Jones	(Australia) Barry Jones (Australia) Tony Mulvihill	Holden VK Commodore SS	92
DNF	A	24	Jagparts Racing	(Australia) Gerald Kay (Australia) Martin Power	Holden VK Commodore SS	92
DNF	A	12	G. Willmington	(Australia) Gary Willmington (New Zealand) Peter Janson	Jaguar XJS	81
DNF	A	7	Mobil Holden Dealer Team	(Australia) John Harvey (Australia) David Parsons	Holden VK Commodore SS	78
DNF	A	6	Roadways Racing Services	(Australia) Allan Grice (Australia) Warren Cullen	Holden VK Commodore SS	68
DNF	C	60	Toyota Team Australia	(Australia) John Smith (Australia) Drew Price	Toyota Corolla	66
DNF	B	49	J. Bundy	(Australia) John Bundy (Australia) Norm Carr	Mazda RX-7	65
DNF	B	55	Mark Petch	(New Zealand) Robbie Francevic (Australia) John Bowe	Volvo 240T	60
DNF	B	43	Mitsubishi Ralliart	(Australia) Peter Fitzgerald (Australia) Brad Jones	Mitsubishi Starion turbo	50
DNF	A	21	Erle McRae Motor Sport	(Australia) Charlie O'Brien (Australia) Andrew Miedecke	BMW 635 CSi	50
DNF	A	05	Mobil Holden Dealer Team	(Australia) Peter Brock (New Zealand) David Oxton	Holden VK Commodore SS	41
DNF	A	28	Capri Components	(Australia) Laurie Nelson (Australia) Bill O'Brien	Ford Mustang	41
DNF	A	20	J. Keogh	(Australia) Jim Keogh (Australia) Garry Rogers	BMW 635 CSi	39
DNF	A	3	K. Baigent	(New Zealand) Kent Baigent (New Zealand) Neal Lowe	BMW 635 CSi	38
DNF	C	56	M. Minear	(Australia) Mike Minear (Australia) Paul Elliott	Volvo 360 GLT	22

== Notes ==
- Pole Position: #05 Peter Brock - Holden Commodore (VK) - 1:52.3
- Fastest Lap: Dick Johnson / Larry Perkins - Ford Mustang - 1:53.6 (New lap record)
- Race Time: 4:12:26.4

Preceded by 1984 Castrol 500	Sandown 500; 1985	Succeeded by 1986 Castrol 500
