= 1986 Australian Endurance Championship =

Seasons
- ← 1985 1990 →

The 1986 Australian Endurance Championship was a CAMS sanctioned motor racing title open to Touring Cars as specified in the National Competition Rules of CAMS. The title, which was the sixth Australian Endurance Championship, was contested concurrently with the 1986 Australian Manufacturers' Championship, which was the sixteenth in a sequence of manufacturers championships awarded by CAMS, and the seventh to be contested under the Australian Manufacturers' Championship name.

The Australian Endurance Championship was won by Jim Richards driving a BMW 635 CSi and the Australian Manufacturers' Championship was awarded to Nissan. Although Nissan driver George Fury won four of the six rounds, missing the opening round at Amaroo Park and failing to finish at Bathurst, along with the consistency of Richards who scored in every round (including winning at Amaroo) saw the Kiwi win his second straight Endurance title in the BMW. However, his wins, along with high placings by teammates Gary Scott and Terry Sheil gave Nissan an easy 27 point win over BMW in the Manufacturers' title with Jim Richards virtually playing a lone hand for the Bavarian marque.

Round 5, The Sun South Pacific 300 at Calder Park in Melbourne, saw the first ever rolling start in Australian touring car racing (though rolling starts had been seen in Series Production during the 1960s and 1970s). The race also doubled as the opening round of the five race South Pacific Touring Car Championship, with the second round being the Group A support race for the 1986 Australian Grand Prix in Adelaide. The remaining 3 rounds of the South Pacific series were held in New Zealand with Allan Grice, driving a Commodore in Australia and a Skyline in New Zealand, emerging as champion.

== Calendar ==
The championship was contested over a six-round series.

Round	Race name	Circuit	Date	Winner(s)	Car	Team	Report
1	Better Brakes 300	Amaroo Park	3 August	(New Zealand) Jim Richards	BMW 635 CSi	JPS Team BMW	
2	BP Plus 300	Surfers Paradise	24 August	(Australia) George Fury (Australia) Glenn Seton	Nissan Skyline DR30 RS	Peter Jackson Nissan Racing	
3	Castrol 500	Sandown Raceway	14 September	(Australia) George Fury (Australia) Glenn Seton	Nissan Skyline DR30 RS	Peter Jackson Nissan Racing	Report
4	James Hardie 1000	Mount Panorama	5 October	(Australia) Allan Grice (Australia) Graeme Bailey	Holden VK Commodore SS Group A	Chickadee Chicken	Report
5	The Sun South Pacific 300	Calder Park	19 October	(Australia) George Fury (Australia) Glenn Seton	Nissan Skyline DR30 RS	Peter Jackson Nissan Racing	
6	Pepsi 250	Oran Park	8 November	(Australia) George Fury	Nissan Skyline DR30 RS	Peter Jackson Nissan Racing	

== Class structure ==
Cars competed in three classes defined according to engine capacity:

- Class A : Up to 2000cc
- Class B : 2001 to 3000cc
- Class C : 3001 to 6000cc

== Championship points system ==
Australian Endurance Championship points were awarded to the drivers of the top twenty placed cars in each round, with the actual allocation dependent on the outright position obtained and the class in which the car was competing.

Outright Position	1st	2nd	3rd	4th	5th	6th	7th	8th	9th	10th	11th	12th	13th	14th	15th	16th	17th	18th	19th	20th
If car in Class A	30	27	24	21	19	17	15	14	13	12	11	10	9	8	7	6	5	4	3	2
If car in Class B	28	26	23	20	18	16	14	13	12	11	10	9	8	7	6	5	4	3	2	1
If car in Class C	25	23	20	17	15	13	11	10	9	8	7	6	5	4	3	2	1	0	0	0

Two drivers per car were compulsory at both the Sandown and Bathurst rounds.

For races in which two drivers per car were not compulsory but two drivers each drove more than one third distance, points for the position gained were shared equally between the two drivers.

For races in which two drivers per car were not compulsory but two drivers did not both drive more than one third distance each, full points were awarded to the driver who drove the greater distance.

For races in which two drivers were compulsory, full points were awarded to both drivers provided that each had driven more than one third distance.

In all cases points were only awarded to a driver who had driven no more than one car during the event.

Only the highest scoring car of each make earned points (for its manufacturer in each race) and then only the points applicable to the position filled.

== Results ==
=== Australian Endurance Championship ===
Pos.	Driver	No.	Class	Car	Entrant	Ama.	Sur.	San.	Bat.	Cal.	Ora.	Total
1	Jim Richards	1	C	BMW 635 CSi	JPS Team BMW	25	23	15	13	20	23	119
2	George Fury	30	B	Nissan Skyline DR30 RS	Peter Jackson Nissan Racing	-	28	28	-	14	28	98
3	Tony Longhurst	25; 1	B C	BMW 325i BMW 635 CSi	JPS Team BMW	26	20	15	13	10	-	84
4	Murray Carter	36	B	Nissan Skyline DR30 RS	Everlast Battery Service	12	14	14	11	4	17	72
5	Colin Bond	75	B	Alfa Romeo GTV6	Network Alfa	23	13	6	-	5.5	23	70.5
6	Gary Scott	15	B	Nissan Skyline DR30 RS	Peter Jackson Nissan Racing	-	-	26	23	20	-	69
7	Peter Brock	05	C	Holden VK Commodore SS Group A	Mobil Holden Dealer Team	-	6.5	17	15	23	-	61.5
8	John Harvey	3	C	Holden VK Commodore SS Group A	Mobil Holden Dealer Team	-	-	10	23	10	17	60
9	Terry Shiel	15	B	Nissan Skyline DR30 RS	Peter Jackson Nissan Racing	-	-	26	23	-	6	55
10	Graeme Bailey	2	C	Holden VK Commodore SS Group A	Chickadee Chicken	-	8	20	25	-	-	53
11	Allan Grice	2	C	Holden VK Commodore SS Group A	Chickadee Chicken	-	-	20	25	-	-	45
12	Glenn Seton	30	B	Nissan Skyline DR30 RS	Peter Jackson Nissan Racing	-	-	28	-	14	-	42
13	Allan Moffat	05	C	Holden VK Commodore SS Group A	Mobil Holden Dealer Team	-	6.5	17	15	-	-	38.5
14	Dick Johnson	17	C	Ford Mustang GT	Palmer Tube Mills	-	20	-	17	-	-	37
15	Neal Lowe	3	C	Holden VK Commodore SS Group A	Mobil Holden Dealer Team	-	-	10	23	-	-	33
16	Graeme Crosby	6	C	Holden VK Commodore SS Group A	Bob Jane T-Marts	-	7.5	13	5	4.5	-	30
16	Wayne Wilkinson	6	C	Holden VK Commodore SS Group A	Bob Jane T-Marts	-	7.5	13	5	4.5	-	30
18	Mike Quinn	61	A	Toyota Sprinter AE86	Bob Holden Motors; Toyota Team Australia	17	-	5	3	-	-	25
18	Bill O'Brien	36	B	Nissan Skyline DR30 RS	Everlast Battery Service	-	-	14	11	-	-	25
20	John Giddings	60	A	Nissan Gazelle	Giddings Moss Vale	-	11	-	-	2	11	24
21	John Smith	16	A	Toyota Corolla GT	Toyota Team Australia	19	-	-	-	2	-	21
22	Garry Rogers	7	C	BMW 635 CSi	Goold Motorsport	-	-	7	-	-	13	20
22	Brad Jones	53	B	Mitsubishi Starion Turbo	BJ Motorsport	20	-	-	-	-	-	20
24	Tony Mulvihill	19	C	Holden VK Commodore SS Group A	Tony Mulvihill	10	-	5	4	-	-	19
24	Larry Perkins	11	C	Holden VK Commodore SS Group A	Enzed Team Perkins	-	-	4	-	15	-	19
26	Charlie O'Brien	7	C	BMW 635 CSi	Goold Motorsport	-	-	7	-	11	-	18
26	David Ratcliff	58	A	Toyota Sprinter AE86	Ratcliff Transport Spares	11	7	-	-	-	-	18
28	Gregg Hansford	17	C	Ford Mustang GT	Palmer Tube Mills	-	-	-	17	-	-	17
29	Brian Callaghan	47	C	Holden VK Commodore SS Group A	Brian Callaghan	5.5	-	-	-	-	11	16.5
29	Warren Cullen	8	C	Holden VK Commodore SS Group A	Cullen Supa Salvage	-	-	-	10	6.5	-	16.5
29	Gary Sprague	8	C	Holden VK Commodore SS Group A	Cullen Supa Salvage	-	-	-	10	6.5	-	16.5
32	Brian Bolwell	87	B	BMW 323i	Brian Bolwell	9	-	5	-	-	-	14
32	Graham Lusty	23	C	Holden VK Commodore SS Group A	Lusty Engineering P/L	-	-	-	3	2	9	14
34	Gerald Kay	24	C	Holden VK Commodore SS Group A	Jagparts	8	-	-	-	5	-	13
35	Warwick Rooklyn	57	B	Alfa Romeo GTV6	Network Alfa	-	-	-	3	-	9	12
35	Franz Klammer	14	B	Mercedes-Benz 190E 2.3-16	Bob Jane T-Marts	-	-	-	12	-	-	12
35	Denny Hulme	14	B	Mercedes-Benz 190E 2.3-16	Bob Jane T-Marts	-	-	-	12	-	-	12
38	Peter Williamson	77	C	Toyota Celica Supra	Peter Williamson Toyota	-	-	11	-	-	-	11
38	Mark Skaife	77	C	Toyota Celica Supra	Peter Williamson Toyota	-	-	11	-	-	-	11
38	Graham Moore	22	C	Holden VK Commodore SS Group A	Formula 1 Investments	-	-	-	11	-	-	11
38	Michel Delcourt	22	C	Holden VK Commodore SS Group A	Formula 1 Investments	-	-	-	11	-	-	11
38	David Morton		A	Toyota Corolla	Toyota Team Australia	-	8	3	-	-	-	11
43	Garry Wilmington	12	C	Jaguar XJ-S	Garry Wilmington	-	-	-	-	-	10	10
43	Neville Crichton	42	B	Volvo 240T	Volvo Dealer Team	-	-	-	10	-	-	10
43	Graeme McRae	42	B	Volvo 240T	Volvo Dealer Team	-	-	-	10	-	-	10
46	Alf Grant	27	C	Holden VK Commodore SS Group A	Dulux Autocolour	-	9	-	-	-	-	9
46	Mike Burgmann	33	C	Holden VK Commodore SS Group A	Michael Burgmann	-	-	9	-	-	-	9
46	Mal Rose	33	C	Holden VK Commodore SS Group A	Michael Burgmann	-	-	9	-	-	-	9
46	Ken Mathews	19	C	Holden VK Commodore SS Group A	Tony Mulvihill	-	-	5	4	-	-	9
46	Chris Clearihan	36	A C	Toyota Corolla; Holden VK Commodore SS Group A	Toyota Team Australia; Airport Car Rental	-	-	3	6	-	-	9
51	Lucio Cesario	57	B	Alfa Romeo GTV6	Network Alfa	-	-	-	3	5.5	-	8.5
52	Ray Ellis	38	C	Holden VK Commodore SS Group A	Grellis Marketing	-	-	6	2	-	-	8
52	John Faulkner	61	A	Toyota Corolla GT	Toyota Team Australia	-	-	5	3	-	-	8
52	Tony Kavich	28	C	Holden VK Commodore SS Group A	Yellow Pages	-	-	-	-	-	8	8
52	Kerry Baily	38	C	Holden VK Commodore SS Group A	Grellis Marketing	-	-	6	2	-	-	8
56	Peter McLeod	4	C	Holden VK Commodore SS Group A	Autopart Centre	-	-	-	-	3	4	7
57	Peter Fitzgerald	75	B	Alfa Romeo GTV6	Network Alfa	-	-	6	-	-	-	6
57	Bruce Stewart	60	A	Nissan Gazelle	Giddings Moss Vale	-	-	4	-	2	-	6
57	Trevor Ashby	34	C	Holden VK Commodore SS Group A	Lansvale Racing Team	-	6	-	-	-	-	6
57	Fred Geissler	36	C	Holden VK Commodore SS Group A	Airport Car Rental	-	-	-	6	-	-	6
61	Barry Graham	47	C	Holden VK Commodore SS Group A	Brian Callaghan	5.5	-	-	-	-	-	5.5
62	Tony Farrell	87	B	BMW 323i	Brian Bolwell	-	-	5	-	-	-	5
62	John Craft		B	Ford Capri 3000S	John Craft	-	-	-	-	-	5	5
64	Ray Gulson	49	B	Alfa Romeo GTV6	Ray Gulson	-	-	-	-	-	4	4
64	David Parsons	11	C	Holden VK Commodore SS Group A	Enzed Team Perkins	-	-	4	-	-	-	4
66	Denis Horley		B	Ford Capri 3000S	Denis Horley	-	-	-	-	-	3	3
66	Daryl Hendrick		A	Isuzu Gemini ZZ	Daryl Hendrick	-	-	-	-	-	3	3
66	John Lusty	23	C	Holden VK Commodore SS Group A	Lusty Engineering	-	-	-	3	-	-	3
66	Drew Price	16	A	Toyota Corolla GT	Toyota Team Australia	-	-	-	-	3	-	3
70	Lester Smerdon	35	C	Holden VK Commodore SS Group A	Lester Smerdon	-	2.5	-	-	-	-	2.5
70	Geoff Russell	35	C	Holden VK Commodore SS Group A	Lester Smerdon	-	2.5	-	-	-	-	2.5
70	Gregory Whitaker		A	Toyota Corolla	Gregory Whitaker	-	2.5	-	-	-	-	2.5
70	Charlie Senese		A	Toyota Corolla	Gregory Whitaker	-	2.5	-	-	-	-	2.5
74	Keith McClelland	62	A	Toyota Sprinter AE86	Bob Holden Motors	-	-	2	-	-	-	2
74	Brian Nightingale	62	A	Toyota Sprinter AE86	Bob Holden Motors	-	-	2	-	-	-	2
74	Ken Lusty	23	C	Holden VK Commodore SS Group A	Lusty Engineering	-	-	-	-	2	-	2
77	Simon Emmerling	26	C	BMW 635 CSi	Simon Emmerling	-	-	-	1	-	-	1
77	Trevor Hine	26	C	BMW 635 CSi	Simon Emmerling	-	-	-	1	-	-	1

=== Australian Manufacturers' Championship ===
Position	Manufacturer	Points
1	Nissan	147
2	BMW	120
3	Holden	111
4	Alfa Romeo	80
5	Toyota	44
6	Ford	40
7	Mitsubishi	20
8	Mercedes-Benz	10
9	Volvo	10

== See also ==
1986 Australian Touring Car season
