= 1985 James Hardie 1000 =

Motor race in Australia

Seasons
- ← 1984 1986 →

Layout of the Mount Panorama Circuit (1938-1986)

The 1985 James Hardie 1000 was a motor race held on 6 October 1985 at the Mount Panorama Circuit just outside Bathurst, in New South Wales, Australia. It was the 26th running of the Bathurst 1000 and was the first held exclusively for cars complying with the Australian version of International Group A touring car regulations. The event, which was organised by the Australian Racing Drivers Club Ltd, was Round Four of both the 1985 Australian Endurance Championship and the 1985 Australian Manufacturers' Championship.

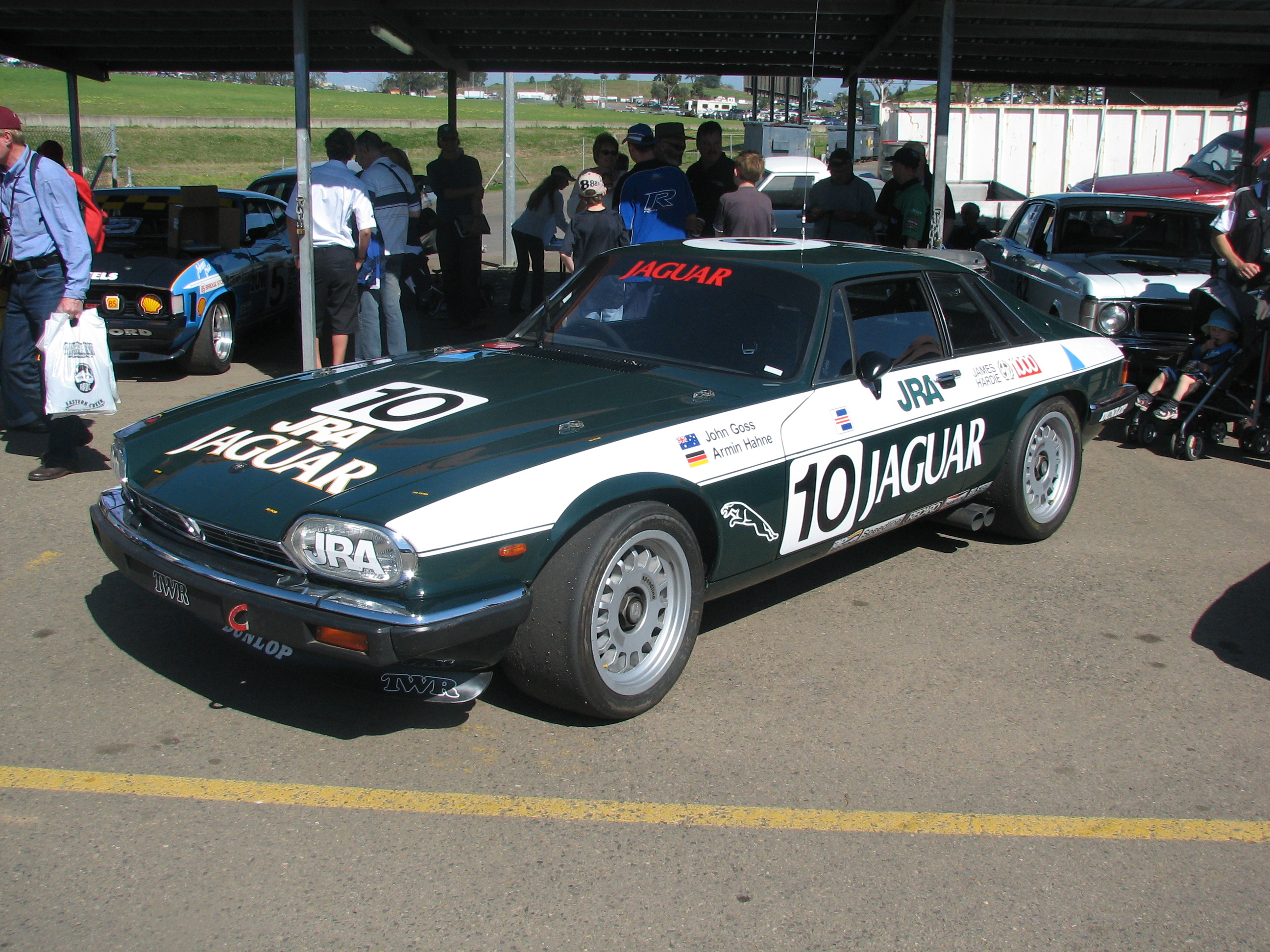
The 1980 Jaguar XJ-S of John Goss repainted as a replica of the 1985 James Hardie 1000 race winner, pictured in 2007

The race was dominated by the Tom Walkinshaw Racing run Jaguar XJ-S's, which finished first and third. John Goss and German driver Armin Hahne claimed the victory with team owner Tom Walkinshaw and his co-driver Win Percy finishing three laps down in third. On the same lap as the winning Jaguar was the Schnitzer Motorsport prepared BMW 635CSi of Italian driver Roberto Ravaglia and Venezuela's former Motorcycle World champion (and ex-Formula One driver) Johnny Cecotto who, despite their extensive overseas experience, were Bathurst rookies and as such easily co-won the Rookie of the Year award. The Holden Dealer Team Holden VK Commodore of Peter Brock and New Zealand open-wheel racer David Oxton was in second place with three laps to go when it broke a timing chain and retired.

1985 was the first Great Race since 1968 in which four-time winner Allan Moffat was not an entrant. Left without a drive in 1985 after the withdrawal of Mazda from Australian touring car racing, Moffat was guest expert commentator with race broadcaster Channel 7.

The 1985 James Hardie 1000 was also the first Great Race since 1966, to be won by a car manufacturer other than Ford or Holden.

== Class structure ==
The race was held for cars complying with the Australian version of International Group A touring car regulations with three engine capacity classes.

=== Class A – Up to 2000 cc ===
Six cars were entered for Class A, including four Toyotas, two of them factory supported, an Alfa Romeo Alfetta which did not start and a Volvo 360 which also failed to start.

=== Class B – 2001–3000 cc ===
With a multiplication factor of 1.4 applied to cars with turbocharged engines, a 2000cc car with a turbocharger was rated at 2800cc for the purposes of the class structure. This saw the factory supported turbocharged Mitsubishi Starions and a Volvo 240 compete against non-turbo Audi 5+5, Toyota Celica Supra and the factory-backed Alfa Romeo GTV6. It was the first time since the 1973 race that there was no Ford Capri on the grid. Also, after having 13 on the grid in 1984, there was only one solitary Mazda RX-7 at Bathurst in 1985, running the 12A rotary engine without peripheral porting.

=== Class C – over 3000 cc ===
The class featured Holden VK Commodore SS V8s, the big 5.3L V12 Jaguar XJ-S', the 4.9L V8 Ford Mustang GT's, the 3.5L V8 Rover Vitesses and the 3.5L Straight-six BMW 635 CSi.

Although the HDT Special Vehicles road car division had failed to build the required 500 "evo" model Commodore's by the 1 August FISA homologation date, there were enough 4.9L base model Commodore road cars to allow Holden runners to use the smaller capacity 4.9L V8 engine in order to come under the 5000 cc class cutoff and be able to run 175 kg (385.8 lb) lighter. However, the engine was still the production V8 which came with known issues such as a single row timing chain (double row was preferred) as well as somewhat brittle valves and rockers, issues that would be fixed with the full blown Group A SS version that would appear in 1986. Use of the smaller Holden V8 also allowed the use of a 5-speed racing gearbox rather than the VK's production 4-speed. For 1985, all Commodore's regardless of engine size ran the standard VK Commodore body devoid of the front and rear spoilers that would appear on the 1986 cars

Thus the Holden Commodore V8's ran in two different configurations:

- 4.9L (4980 cc) - 5-speed gearbox (Getrag 265) and a minimum weight of 1,325 kg (2,921.1 lb)
- 5.0L (5044 cc) - Holden production 4-speed M21 gearbox (known colloquially as the "Aussie 4 speed") and a minimum weight of 1,400 kg (3,086.5 lb)

Due to high demand after Australia had gone wholesale Group A in 1985, there ended up being a lack of available Getrag gearboxes by the time of the James Hardie, thus some of the 4.9L Commodores were forced to use Holden's production 4-speed box. Unfortunately for the West German based transmission company in 1985, being the major supplier of Group A racing gearboxes for both touring cars and rallying saw them struggle to keep up with demand with the increasing amount of Group A racing across the globe.

== Hardies Heroes ==
Pos	No	Entrant	Driver	Car	HH	Qual
Pole	8	JRA Ltd / Jaguar Racing	(United Kingdom) Tom Walkinshaw	Jaguar XJ-S	2:18.822	2:19.78
2	9	JRA Ltd / Jaguar Racing	(United Kingdom) Jeff Allam	Jaguar XJ-S	2:19.915	2:20.32
3	17	Palmer Tube Mills	(Australia) Dick Johnson	Ford Mustang GT	2:20.646	2:21.79
4	6	Roadways Racing Services	(Australia) Allan Grice	Holden VK Commodore SS	2:20.661	2:21.72
5	55	Mark Petch Motorsport	(New Zealand) Robbie Francevic	Volvo 240T	2:20.873	2:22.22
6	10	JRA Ltd / Jaguar Racing	(Australia) John Goss	Jaguar XJ-S	2:20.919	2:19.77
7	1	JPS Team BMW	(New Zealand) Jim Richards	BMW 635 CSi	2:21.396	2:21.68
8	18	Palmer Tube Mills	(Australia) Larry Perkins	Ford Mustang GT	2:22.340	2:21.99
9	21	Goold Motorsport	(Italy) Roberto Ravaglia	BMW 635 CSi	2:22.874	2:24.25
10	7	Mobil Holden Dealer Team	(Australia) David Parsons	Holden VK Commodore SS	2:22.886	2:23.22
11	05	Mobil Holden Dealer Team	(Australia) Peter Brock	Holden VK Commodore SS	2:23.018	2:22.85

* Tom Walkinshaw's pole time of 2:18.822 in his Group A Jaguar XJ-S was 0.138 seconds faster than he had qualified John Goss' Group C Jaguar XJS in Hardie's Heroes the previous year. It was also the first time a driver had gone from being the slowest in the runoff one year to being the fastest a year later. Showing the difference in performance between Group A and Group C at that stage, Walkinshaw's time was 4.972 seconds slower than George Fury's pole winning time of 1984.
* Walkinshaw's Jaguar was recorded at 274 km/h (170 mph) on Conrod Straight during the runoff. The fastest non-Jaguar was the turbocharged Volvo 240T driven by Bathurst Rookie Robbie Francevic which recorded 260 km/h (162 mph). The once dominant V8 Holden and Fords were slower still, topping out at around 250 km/h (155 mph).
* Volvo became the 8th marque to be represented in the Top 10 runoff since its inception in 1978 when Auckland based Robbie Francevic qualified his Mark Petch Motorsport Volvo 240T in 5th place. The Volvo was also the only turbo powered car in the runoff.
* With Walkinshaw on pole and teammate Jeff Allam in second, 1985 was the first and so far only year that cars powered by V12 engines have filled the front row of the grid at Bathurst. It was also the first time since Peter Brock and Colin Bond had qualified 1-2 for the Holden Dealer Team in 1974 that one team had occupied the front row.
* The No. 18 DJR Ford Mustang GT driven by Larry Perkins was officially withdrawn from the race following Hardies Heroes. Every car on the grid that qualified behind the car was then moved up one grid position. The car had been entered as an insurance policy should something happen to keep the #17 Mustang out of the race, and to give drivers Dick Johnson and Perkins the maximum amount of practice time before the race.
* For the first time there were 11 cars and not 10 in the runoff. The ARDC had originally bumped the Larry Perkins Mustang believing (correctly) that it would not start the race despite persistent rumours that it would, and included in its place the BMW 635 CSi of Bathurst rookie and 1985 Spa 24 Hours winner Roberto Ravaglia. However, DJR protested as their car had provisionally qualified 8th. As the ARDC had no grounds to exclude it as regulations stated the top 8 qualifiers were an automatic inclusion, the runoff went ahead with both Perkins and Ravaglia taking part.
* 1985 was the only time Peter Brock was out-qualified by one of his HDT team mates in Hardie's Heroes, qualifying 0.132 behind David Parsons, who was listed only as co-driver to 1983 race winner John Harvey in the No. 7 car. Prior to this the closest a team mate had got to him in HH was when Harvey was only 1.19 seconds slower in 1980. 1985 would also be the only time that the HDT had the slowest two cars in the runoff.
* The fastest driver in official qualifying, 1974 winner John Goss, made his first and only appearance in Hardie's Heroes. Goss' Jaguar had also qualified for the shootout in 1984 but Tom Walkinshaw was at the wheel.

== Official results ==
Bold donates outright and class winners

Pos	Class	No	Entrant	Drivers	Car	Laps	Qual Pos	Shootout Pos
1	C	10	JRA Ltd / Jaguar Racing	(Australia) John Goss (West Germany) Armin Hahne	Jaguar XJ-S	163	1	6
2	C	21	Goold Motorsport	(Venezuela) Johnny Cecotto (Italy) Roberto Ravaglia	BMW 635 CSi	163	11	9
3	C	8	JRA Ltd / Jaguar Racing	(United Kingdom) Tom Walkinshaw (United Kingdom) Win Percy	Jaguar XJ-S	160	2	1
4	C	1	JPS Team BMW	(New Zealand) Jim Richards (Australia) Tony Longhurst	BMW 635 CSi	160	4	7
5	C	3	H. Kent Baigent	(New Zealand) Kent Baigent (New Zealand) Neal Lowe	BMW 635 CSi	159	12	
6	C	20	Jim Keogh	(Australia) Jim Keogh (Australia) Garry Rogers	BMW 635 CSi	159	16	
7	C	17	Palmer Tube Mills	(Australia) Dick Johnson (Australia) Larry Perkins	Ford Mustang GT	159	6	3
8	B	47	Network Alfa	(Australia) Colin Bond (Australia) Gregg Hansford	Alfa Romeo GTV6	158	21	
9	B	42	Mitsubishi Ralliart	(Australia) Kevin Bartlett (Australia) Peter McKay	Mitsubishi Starion	157	13	
10	C	41	Barry Jones	(Australia) Barry Jones (Australia) Tony Mulvihill	Holden VK Commodore SS	156	25	
11	C	25	Yellow Pages	(Australia) Tony Kavich (Australia) Ralph Radburn	Holden VK Commodore SS	156	34	
12	C	40	Terry Finnigan	(Australia) Terry Finnigan (Australia) Barry Lawrence	Holden VK Commodore SS	155	24	
13	C	11	Alf Barbagallo	(New Zealand) Tim Slako (Australia) Geoff Leeds	Rover Vitesse	152	18	
14	C	12	Garry Willmington	(Australia) Garry Willmington (New Zealand) Peter Janson	Jaguar XJ-S	150	29	
15	C	19	Ken Mathews Prestige Cars	(Australia) Ken Mathews (Australia) Bob Muir	Holden VK Commodore SS	147	38	
16	B	45	Ray Gulson	(Australia) Ray Gulson (Australia) Frank Porter	Alfa Romeo GTV6	147	40	
17	A	60	Toyota Team Australia	(Australia) John Smith (Australia) Drew Price	Toyota Corolla GT	147	42	
18	C	30	Lester Smerdon	(Australia) Lester Smerdon (Australia) Geoff Russell	Holden VK Commodore SS	145	38	
19	B	51	Greville Arnel	(Australia) Andrew Harris (Australia) Greville Arnel	Mitsubishi Starion	141	48	
20	C	39	Sleepyhead Beds	(New Zealand) Graeme Bowkett (New Zealand) Wayne Wilkinson	Holden VK Commodore SS	135	20	
21	B	53	Chris Heyer's Kingswood Import Centre	(Australia) Chris Heyer (New Zealand) Graham McGregor	Audi 5+5	134	49	
22	C	36	Lusty Engineering	(Australia) Graham Lusty (Australia) Ken Lusty	Holden VK Commodore SS	133	45	
23	C	34	The Xerox Shop	(Australia) Alan Taylor (Australia) Kevin Kennedy	Holden VK Commodore SS	132	41	
DNF	C	05	Mobil Holden Dealer Team	(Australia) Peter Brock (New Zealand) David Oxton	Holden VK Commodore SS	160	9	11
DNF	C	14	Auckland Coin & Bullion Exchange	(New Zealand) Denny Hulme (New Zealand) Ray Smith	Holden VK Commodore SS	146	15	
DNF	C	13	Grellis Marketing	(Australia) Bernie McClure (Australia) Ray Ellis	Holden VK Commodore SS	136	36	
DNF	C	4	I.M.B. Team Wollongong	(Australia) Peter McLeod (Australia) Graeme Bailey	Holden VK Commodore SS	126	22	
DNF	A	57	Bob Holden Motors Manly Vale	(Australia) Bob Holden (New Zealand) Glenn Clark	Toyota Sprinter AE86	123	46	
DNF	B	55	Mark Petch Motorsport	(New Zealand) Robbie Francevic (Australia) John Bowe	Volvo 240T	122	8	5
NC	B	54	Melbourne Clutch & Brake Service	(Australia) Brian Sampson (Australia) Garry Waldon	Mitsubishi Starion	117	35	
NC	C	37	Brian Callaghan	(Australia) Barry Graham (Australia) Brian Callaghan	Holden VK Commodore SS	114	26	
DNF	C	6	Super K-Mart; Roadways Racing Services	(Australia) Allan Grice (Australia) Warren Cullen	Holden VK Commodore SS	114	5	4
DNF	C	24	Jagparts Racing	(Australia) Gerald Kay (Australia) Martin Power	Holden VK Commodore SS	112	33	
DNF	A	61	Toyota Team Australia	(New Zealand) John Faulkner (Australia) Ray Cutchie	Toyota Sprinter AE86	110	43	
DNF	C	22	Erle McRae Motorsport	(Australia) Charlie O'Brien (Australia) John English	BMW 635 CSi	106	23	
NC	A	58	David Ratcliff	(Australia) David Ratcliff (Australia) Don Smith	Toyota Sprinter AE86	98	47	
NC	C	2	Masterton Homes	(Australia) Steve Masterton (Australia) Bruce Stewart	Holden VK Commodore SS	96	53	
DNF	C	7	Mobil Holden Dealer Team	(Australia) John Harvey (Australia) David Parsons	Holden VK Commodore SS	96	10	10
DNF	C	33	Mike Burgmann	(Australia) Mike Burgmann (Australia) Bob Stevens	Holden VK Commodore SS	93	30	
DNF	C	31	JPS Team BMW	(Australia) George Fury (New Zealand) Neville Crichton	BMW 635 CSi	68	17	
DNF	B	49	John Bundy	(Australia) John Bundy (Australia) Norm Carr	Mazda RX-7	67	51	
DNF	C	16	Flexible Hose Supplies	(United Kingdom) Barry Robinson (United Kingdom) Jon Jeffery	Rover Vitesse	59	52	
DNF	C	23	Simon Emmerling	(Australia) Simon Emmerling (Australia) Trevor Hine	BMW 635 CSi	42	31	
DNF	C	38	Barry Wraith	(Australia) Barry Wraith (Australia) Wayne Park	Holden VK Commodore SS	34	39	
DNF	B	44	Peter Williamson Toyota	(Australia) Peter Williamson (Australia) Tomas Mezera	Toyota Celica Supra	32	27	
DNF	C	29	Ken Davison	(Australia) Ken Davison (Australia) Wally Kramer	Ford Mustang GT	19	44	
DNF	C	28	Capri Components	(Australia) Lawrie Nelson (Australia) Bill O'Brien	Ford Mustang GT	18	37	
DNF	C	32	Anderson & O'Leary	(New Zealand) Bruce Anderson (New Zealand) Wayne Anderson	Ford Mustang GT	17	28	
DNF	C	9	JRA Ltd / Jaguar Racing	(United Kingdom) Jeff Allam (Australia) Ron Dickson	Jaguar XJ-S	3	3	2
DNF	B	43	Mitsubishi Ralliart	(Australia) Brad Jones (Australia) Peter Fitzgerald	Mitsubishi Starion	0	14	
DNF	C	27	Alf Grant	(Australia) Alf Grant (Australia) John French	Holden VK Commodore SS	0	19	
DNS	C	18	Palmer Tube Mills	(Australia) Larry Perkins (Australia) Dick Johnson	Ford Mustang GT		7	8
DNS	B	52	Formula 1 Investments	(Australia) Graham Moore (Belgium) Michel Delcourt	Mitsubishi Starion		50	
DNS	C	26	Super K-Mart; Roadways Racing Services	(Australia) Warren Cullen (Australia) Allan Grice	Holden VK Commodore SS			
DNS	A	59	Phil McDonnell	(Australia) Greg Crick (Australia) Phil McDonnell	Alfa Romeo Alfetta			

== Statistics ==
- Provisional pole position – #10 John Goss – 2:19.77
- Pole position – #8 Tom Walkinshaw – 2:18.822
- Fastest lap – #10 John Goss – 2:21.86
- Average speed – 150 km/h
- Race time – 6:41:30.19
