= 1983 James Hardie 1000 =

Motor race in Australia

Seasons
- ← 1982 1984 →

Layout of the Mount Panorama Circuit (1938–1986)

The 1983 James Hardie 1000 was a motor race for Group C Touring Cars contested at the Mount Panorama Circuit, Bathurst, New South Wales, Australia on 2 October 1983. It was the 24th "Bathurst 1000" and the third to carry the James Hardie 1000 name. The race, which took place as part of Round 4 of the 1983 Australian Endurance Championship, was contested over 163 laps of the 6.172 km circuit, a total distance of 1006.036 km.

The Holden Dealer Team took a controversial, but legal, victory with the team's second Holden VH Commodore SS driven by John Harvey, Peter Brock and Larry Perkins. Harvey and Phil Brock qualified the car but after the #05 car blew its engine on lap 8, Peter Brock and Perkins transferred themselves into Harvey's car. Phil Brock never drove the car on race day and was forced to spectate as his three teammates won the race in the car he qualified in, a decision that he claimed was made by Perkins as team manager despite Perkins being the slowest qualifier of the quartet and despite it also being legal for four drivers to drive one car (something Perkins refutes claiming the rules only allowed a maximum of three drivers per car). The car was also the car which Peter Brock and Larry Perkins had won the race in 1982 and updated to 1983 specs, meaning this Holden Commodore became the first race car to win the Bathurst 1000 twice. The Holden Dealer Team Commodore finished a lap ahead of Allan Moffat and Japanese driver Yoshimi Katayama in their Peter Stuyvesant sponsored Mazda RX-7. It would be the closest Mazda would get to winning the race. Third was the STP Roadways Racing Holden Commodore driven by 1982 pole sitter Allan Grice and 1969 winner Colin Bond.

Only three cars in the race were driven by drivers who had both previously won the race. The three cars were: the #05 Holden Dealer Team (entered Holden VH Commodore SS of defending race winners Brock and Perkins), the #17 Ford XE Falcon of Dick Johnson and Kevin Bartlett, and the #16 Nissan Bluebird Turbo of Fred Gibson and John French.

== Class structure ==
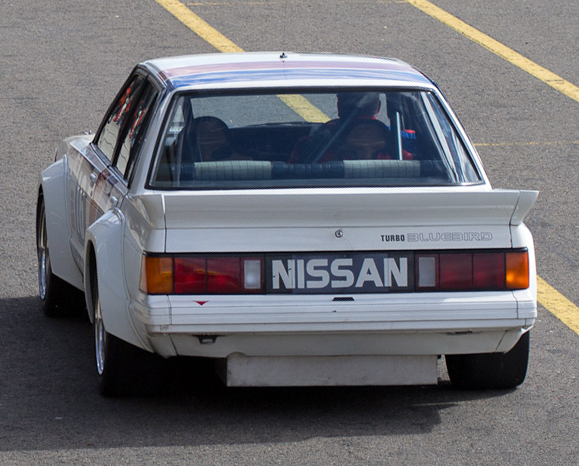
The 22nd placed Nissan Bluebird Turbo of Gibson/French (Car pictured in 2012)

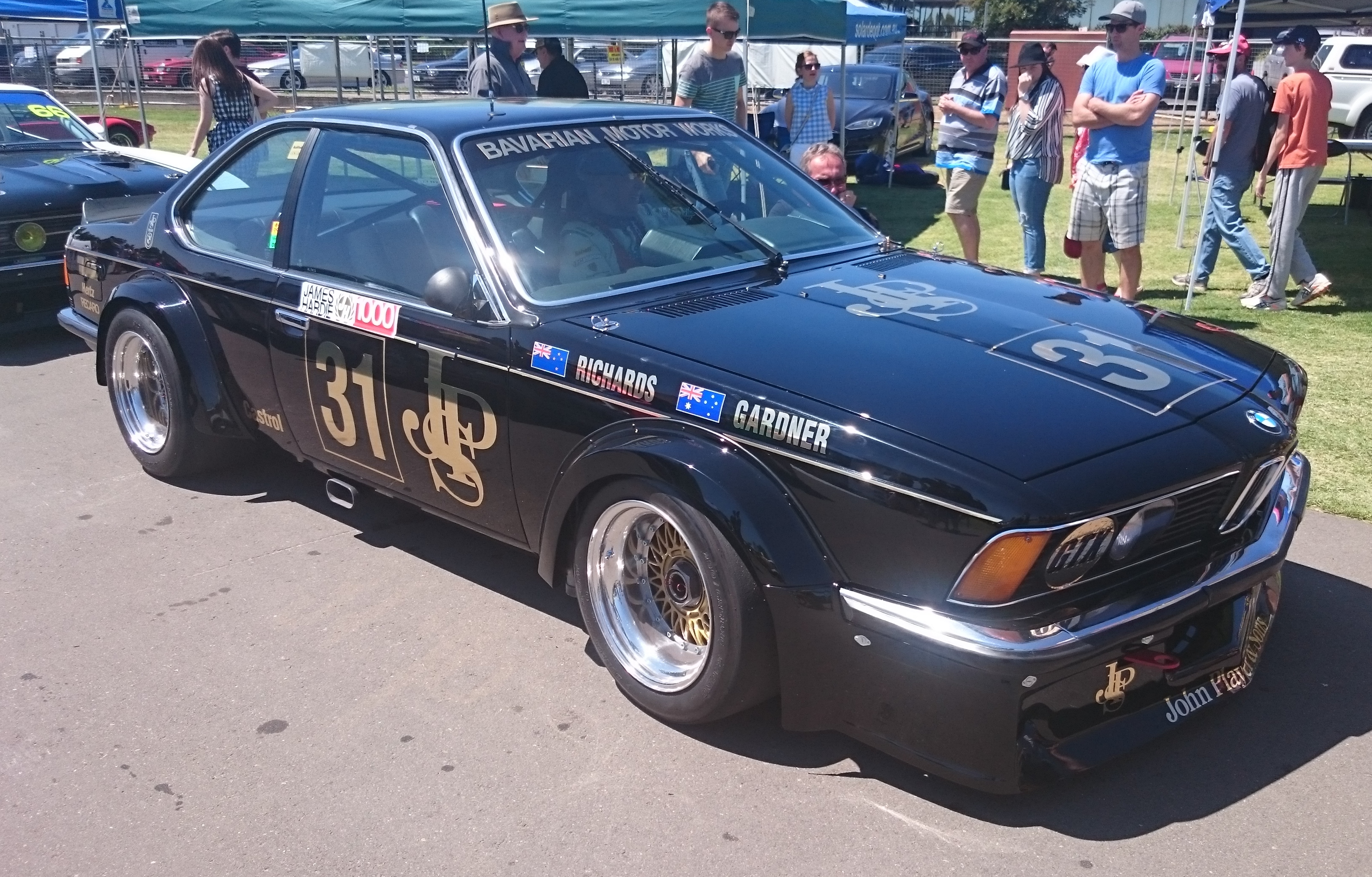
Jim Richards and Frank Gardner shared a BMW 635 CSi, but did not finish. (Car pictured in 2015)

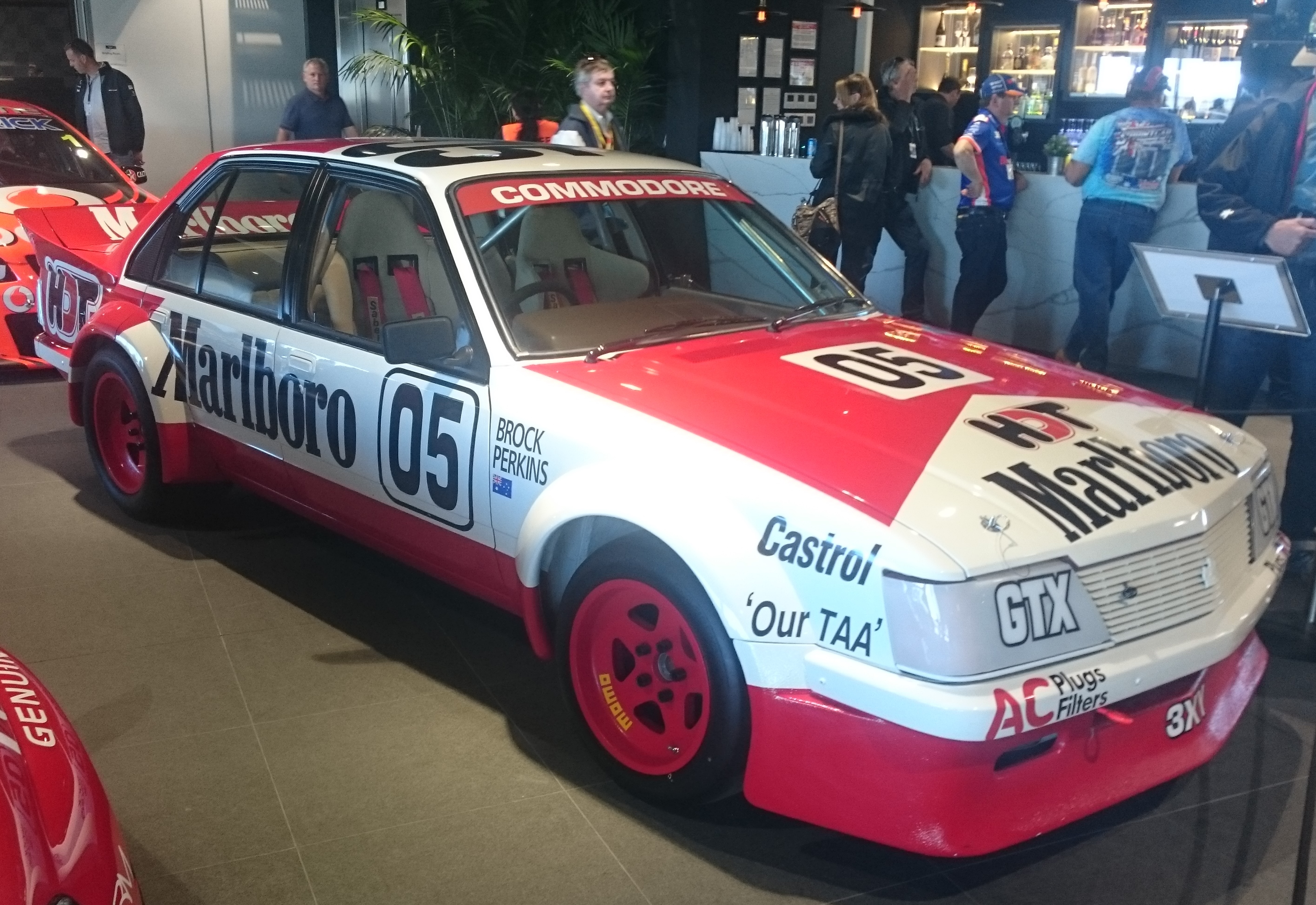
The Holden Commodore VH driven by Peter Brock and Larry Perkins. The car, which did not finish the race, is pictured in 2018

Entries were divided into two classes based on engine capacity:

=== Over 3000 cc ===
For cars of over 3000cc engine capacity, it featured BMW 635 CSi, Chevrolet Camaro, Ford Falcon, Holden Commodore, Mazda RX-7 and Nissan Bluebird.

=== Under 3000 cc ===
For cars of under 3000cc engine capacity, it featured Alfa Romeo GTV6, Audi 5+5, Ford Capri, Isuzu Gemini and Nissan Pulsar.the race for the under 3 litre class was won by Australian Driver Allan "ACE" Cant and co driver and team owner NZ born Les Grose in the #64 wideline windows ford capri.

== Hardies Heroes ==
The final order of the first ten grid positions was established in the "Hardies Heroes" session on the day before the race. This involved the fastest eight cars from qualifying plus two others at the discretion of the organisers contesting two, single timed laps, one car at a time. The fastest lap of each car set its grid position.

Pos	No	Entrants	Driver	Car	HH	Qual
Pole	05	Marlboro Holden Dealer Team	(Australia) Peter Brock	Holden VH Commodore SS	2:16.270	2:15.3
2	15	Nissan	(Australia) George Fury	Nissan Bluebird Turbo	2:17.509	2:17.2
3	3	Cadbury-Schweppes Pty. Ltd.	(Australia) David Parsons	Holden VH Commodore SS	2:18.212	2:17.8
4	31	JPS Team BMW	(New Zealand) Jim Richards	BMW 635 CSi	2:18.414	2:17.6
5	25	Marlboro Holden Dealer Team	(Australia) John Harvey	Holden VH Commodore SS	2:18.549	2:18.0
6	22	Cullen Automotive Industries	(Australia) Warren Cullen	Holden VH Commodore SS	2:18.563	2:18.3
7	11	Soundwave Discos	(Australia) Garry Rogers	Holden VH Commodore SS	2:18.648	2:18.5
8	6	STP Roadways Racing	(Australia) Allan Grice	Holden VH Commodore SS	2:18.963	2:17.8
9	4	John Sands Racing	(Australia) Bob Morris	Holden VH Commodore SS	2:21.184	2:19.1
10	17	Palmer Tube Mills	(Australia) Dick Johnson	Ford XE Falcon	No time	2:16.3

* This was Peter Brock's record 5th pole position at Bathurst having previously taken pole in 1974, 1977, 1978 and 1979. This saw him move one clear of Allan Moffat who had been on pole four times. It was also the last time he would set pole driving a Holden, though he did sit on pole in 1997, but it was his co-driver Mark Skaife who had set the time in the runoff.
* Dick Johnson crashed in Hardies Heroes destroying his Greens-Tuf Falcon. In a show of goodwill no other teams in the race objected to the replacement #17 car starting the race from 10th position.
* 1983 saw the first appearance by BMW in Hardies Heroes with Jim Richards qualifying his JPS Team BMW 635 CSi in 4th place. BMW became the 6th manufacturer to appear in Hardies Heroes following Holden, Ford, Chevrolet, Mazda and Nissan. The BMW was also the first 6 cyl engined car to appear in the runoff.
* 1983 Australian Touring Car Champion and winner of the recent Castrol 400 at Sandown Allan Moffat was expected to easily make the top ten with his 13B powered Mazda RX-7, but could only qualify the car 14th, two places behind teammate Gregg Hansford whose car was running the less powerful 12A engine. This led to accusations of sandbagging by other leading teams, especially the Holden Dealer Team which claimed that Moffat was deliberately holding the car back in qualifying rather than showing its real speed.
* The four-cylinder (Z18ET) Nissan Bluebird Turbo driven by George Fury was the first non-V8 powered car to start on the front row at Bathurst since Peter Brock started second in 1973 in a 6cyl Holden LJ Torana GTR XU-1.
* With seven VH Commodore's in the top 10 this was Holden's greatest representation ever in the runoff. On the other side of the coin, Johnson's Falcon was the only Ford in the top 10, the lowest ever number for that manufacturer. It would be matched in 1986 when the Johnson Group A Mustang was the only Ford in the runoff.
* On the Friday morning before the race, Bob Morris was only at the race as a spectator. When Alan Browne spotted him in the pits, he asked Morris if he wanted to take his drive in Rusty French's John Sands sponsored Commodore. French, the 1983 Australian GT Champion driving a Porsche 935/80, had qualified in 31st place with a 2:25.4 lap. In his first drive since the 1982 Hardies Heroes, Morris improved on French's time by some 6.3 seconds, putting in a 2:19.1 lap, vaulting the car to 10th and giving it a place in the runoff.
* Warren Cullen's laps, the fastest of which ultimately netted him 6th on the grid ahead of the likes of Allan Grice and Bob Morris, were left off of Channel 7's half hour highlights package shown later in the afternoon around Australia after Seven were forced to use too much of their available half hour on the Dick Johnson crash. 1983 was the only time Cullen ever appeared in the Top 10 runoff. His car would be there in 1985 to qualify 4th, but it was that years co-driver Allan Grice who set the time.

== Official results ==
Full results of the 1983 James Hardie 1000 were:

Pos	Class	No	Entrants	Drivers	Car	Laps	Qual Pos	Shootout Pos
1	Over 3000 cc	25	Marlboro Holden Dealer Team	(Australia) John Harvey (Australia) Peter Brock (Australia) Larry Perkins (Australia) (Phil Brock)	Holden VH Commodore SS	163	7	5
2	Over 3000 cc	43	Peter Stuyvesant International	(Canada) Allan Moffat (Japan) Yoshimi Katayama	Mazda RX-7	162	14	
3	Over 3000 cc	6	STP Roadways Racing	(Australia) Allan Grice (Australia) Colin Bond	Holden VH Commodore SS	160	5	8
4	Over 3000 cc	14	STP Roadways Racing	(Australia) Steve Harrington (Australia) Garth Wigston	Holden VH Commodore SS	158	11	
5	Over 3000 cc	50	Petrolon Slick 50	(Australia) Peter McLeod (Australia) Graeme Bailey	Mazda RX-7	158	19	
6	Over 3000 cc	12	Team Toshiba	(Australia) Jim Keogh (New Zealand) Leo Leonard	Holden VH Commodore SS	157	17	
7	Over 3000 cc	27	Alf Grant	(Australia) Alf Grant (Australia) David Seldon	Ford XD Falcon	156	26	
8	Over 3000 cc	4	John Sands Racing	(Australia) Bob Morris (Australia) Rusty French	Holden VH Commodore SS	154	10	9
9	Over 3000 cc	35	Tokico	(Australia) Phil Alexander (Australia) Ron Gillard	Mazda RX-7	153	24	
10	Over 3000 cc	9	Andrew Harris	(Australia) Andrew Harris (Australia) Gary Cooke	Ford XE Falcon*; Holden VH Commodore SS	151	30	
11	Over 3000 cc	41	B.F. Goodrich Australia Ltd.	(Australia) Barry Jones (New Zealand) Rod Millen	Mazda RX-7	151	40	
12	Over 3000 cc	11	Soundwave Discos	(Australia) Garry Rogers (Australia) Clive Benson-Brown	Holden VH Commodore SS	149	9	7
13	Over 3000 cc	8	Everlast Battery Service	(Australia) Garry Willmington (Australia) Mike Griffin	Ford XD Falcon	147	33	
14	Over 3000 cc	24	Scotty Taylor Holden	(Australia) Alan Taylor (Australia) Kevin Kennedy	Holden VH Commodore SS	146	36	
15	Under 3000 cc	64	Les Grose	(Australia) Les Grose (Australia) Alan Cant	Ford Capri Mk. III	144	47	
16	Over 3000 cc	13	Greg Symes	(Australia) Greg Symes (Australia) Bruce Smith	Holden VH Commodore SS	141	31	
17	Under 3000 cc	58	Ray Gulson	(Australia) Ray Gulson (Australia) Gerard Murphy	Alfa Romeo GTV6	141	51	
18	Over 3000 cc	51	Tony Mulvihill	(Australia) Tony Mulvihill (Australia) John Murden	Mazda RX-7	138	49	
19	Over 3000 cc	26	Everlast Battery Service	(Australia) Bill O'Brien (Australia) Brian Sampson	Ford XD Falcon	136	22	
20	Over 3000 cc	47	Brian Callaghan	(Australia) Barry Graham (Australia) Brian Callaghan	Ford XE Falcon	136	28	
21	Over 3000 cc	32	Johnnie Walker	(Australia) Johnnie Walker (Australia) Gene Cook	Mazda RX-7	135	44	
22	Over 3000 cc	16	Nissan	(Australia) Fred Gibson (Australia) John French	Nissan Bluebird Turbo	134	18	
23	Over 3000 cc	19	Ken Mathews Prestige Cars P/L	(Australia) Ken Mathews (Australia) Greg Toepfer	Holden VH Commodore SS	132	23	
24	Under 3000 cc	63	Chris Heyer's Kingswood Import Centre	(Australia) Chris Heyer (Australia) Don Bretland	Audi 5+5	132	57	
25	Under 3000 cc	61	John White	(Australia) John White (Australia) Bernie McLure	Isuzu Gemini	125	52	
26	Under 3000 cc	59	Capri Components	(Australia) Lawrie Nelson (Australia) Peter Jones	Ford Capri Mk. III	114	48	
DNF	Under 3000 cc	55	Barry Seton	(Australia) Barry Seton (Australia) Glenn Seton	Ford Capri Mk. III	134	41	
DNF	Over 3000 cc	15	Nissan	(Australia) George Fury (Australia) Garry Scott	Nissan Bluebird Turbo	130	3	2
DNF	Over 3000 cc	37	Eurocars (Northside) Pty. Ltd.	(Australia) Terry Shiel (Australia) Wally Storey	Mazda RX-7	122	15	
DNF	Over 3000 cc	33	Dreamworld	(Australia) Mike Burgmann (Australia) Tony Longhurst	Chevrolet Camaro Z28	121	21	
DNF	Over 3000 cc	53	Fred Geissler	(Australia) Fred Geissler (Australia) Ralph Radburn	Holden VH Commodore SS	116	29	
DNF	Over 3000 cc	22	Cullen Automotive Industries	(Australia) Warren Cullen (Australia) Ron Harrop	Holden VH Commodore SS	116	8	6
DNF	Over 3000 cc	3	Cadbury-Schweppes Pty. Ltd.	(New Zealand) Peter Janson (Australia) David Parsons	Holden VH Commodore SS	106	6	3
DNF	Over 3000 cc	42	T. P. Ryan	(Australia) Terry Ryan (Australia) Graham Storah	Mazda RX-7	84	56	
DNF	Over 3000 cc	48	Roger Manson Holden	(Australia) Andrew Manson (Australia) Geoffrey Manson	Holden VH Commodore SS	80	38	
NC	Over 3000 cc	38	Gawler, SA	(Australia) Bernie Stack (Australia) Bob Jennings	Holden VH Commodore SS	68	32	
DNF	Over 3000 cc	10	Terry Finnigan	(Australia) Terry Finnigan (Australia) Geoff Leeds	Holden VH Commodore SS	62	16	
DNF	Under 3000 cc	57	L. J. Hazelton	(Australia) Laurie Hazelton (Australia) Jerry Strauberg	Ford Capri Mk. III	61	54	
DNF	Over 3000 cc	17	Palmer Tube Mills	(Australia) Dick Johnson (Australia) Kevin Bartlett	Ford XE Falcon*	61	2	10
NC	Over 3000 cc	34	Peter Stuyvesant International	(Australia) Gregg Hansford (Australia) Garry Waldon	Mazda RX-7	49	12	
DNF	Over 3000 cc	29	John Donnelly	(Australia) John Donnelly (Australia) Kerry Baily	Ford XD Falcon	37	46	
DNF	Over 3000 cc	36	Gerry Burges	(Australia) Gerry Burges (United States) Roger Mandeville	Mazda RX-7	35	39	
DNF	Over 3000 cc	23	Bryan Byrt Ford	(Australia) John English (Australia) Paul Gulson	Ford XD Falcon	32	27	
DNF	Over 3000 cc	21	Ron Dickson	(Australia) Ron Dickson (Australia) Bob Stevens	Mazda RX-7	24	34	
DNF	Over 3000 cc	20	King George Tavern	(Australia) Joe Moore (Australia) Graham Moore	Ford XE Falcon	17	35	
DNF	Over 3000 cc	2	Masterton Homes Pty. Ltd.	(Australia) Steve Masterton (Australia) Bruce Stewart	Ford XE Falcon	17	13	
DNF	Over 3000 cc	18	Valentine Greetings	(Australia) Murray Carter (Australia) David Clement	Mazda RX-7	14	25	
DNF	Under 3000 cc	60	Nissan	(Australia) Christine Gibson (Australia) Bob Muir	Nissan Pulsar EXA	14	37	
DNF	Over 3000 cc	05	Marlboro Holden Dealer Team	(Australia) Peter Brock (Australia) (Larry Perkins)	Holden VH Commodore SS	8	1	1
DNF	Over 3000 cc	39	John Bundy	(Australia) John Bundy (Australia) (Norm Carr)	Mazda RX-7	8	42	
DNF	Over 3000 cc	31	JPS Team BMW	(New Zealand) Jim Richards (Australia) (Frank Gardner)	BMW 635 CSi	6	4	4
DNF	Over 3000 cc	45	Gary Hinton	(Australia) Gary Hinton (Australia) Lester Smerdon	Holden VC Commodore	5	50	
DNF	Under 3000 cc	56	Hulcraft Autos	(Australia) John Craft (Australia) Don Smith	Ford Capri Mk. III	3	43	
DNF	Over 3000 cc	40	CDT Performance Vehicles	(Australia) Tony Hubbard (Australia) (Jim Faneco)	Ford XE Falcon	3	45	
DNF	Over 3000 cc	52	Ron Grose	(Australia) (Ron Grose) (Australia) David Grose	Mazda RX-7	3	53	
DNS	Under 3000 cc	62	Daily Planet	(Australia) (Bob Holden) (United Kingdom) (Gordon Spice)	Toyota Celica	0	55	
DNS	Over 3000 cc	28	Bayside Spare Parts	(Australia) (Barry Lawrence) (Australia) (Geoff Russell)	Holden VH Commodore SS*		20	
DNS	Over 3000 cc	30	Tony Kavich	(Australia) (Paul Jones) (Australia) (Tony Kavich)	Mazda RX-7		58	

== Notes ==
- The names of drivers who practiced in the car but did not take part in the race are shown within brackets.
- Harris/Cooke qualified 30th in the #9 Bendigo Falcon but their car was used to get Johnson/Bartlett back into the race after Johnson crashed the #17 Falcon in Saturday morning's Hardies Heroes. The Harris/Cooke team took part in the race after Johnson's sponsor Ross Palmer (owner of Palmer Tube Mills) acquired the Lawrence/Russell Commodore. The Commodore and Falcon were rebuilt and painted for the race in a marathon effort through Saturday night. After getting stewards and other teams approval the DJR Falcon was allowed to start from 10th while the Bendigo Commodore was allowed to start from position 30. Following the race the Falcon, leased from Harris by Palmer, was returned to the Bendigo Team while the Commodore was returned to Palmer who promptly sold it back to Barry Lawrence.
- Andrew Harris had to get permission from one of his sponsors, Melbourne's Jefferson Ford, to use their Ford dealership name on the re-painted Holden Commodore, which was dubbed the Fordore by the team (the Commodore also carried 5.8 signage, the litre capacity of the Ford 351 Cleveland engine used in the Falcons). In a TV interview during the race with Channel 7's Evan Green, Harris told that he had offered Dick Johnson's wife Jill his Falcon for DJR to get back into the race after seeing a visibly upset Jill Johnson in the pits following her husbands qualifying crash, reasoning that the Ford fans would rather see Johnson in the race than himself. Driving the Commodore Harris ended up finishing 10th and winning the Rookie of the Year award.

== Statistics ==
- Provisional Pole Position - #05 Peter Brock - 2:15.3
- Pole Position - #05 Peter Brock - 2:16.270
- Fastest Lap - #25 Peter Brock - 2:18.5 (lap record)
- Race time of winning car - 6:28:31.6
- Average speed of winning car - 158 km/h
