= 1985 Australian Endurance Championship =

Seasons
- ← 1984 1986 →

The 1985 Australian Endurance Championship was a CAMS sanctioned motor racing title for drivers of Touring Cars complying with an Australian version of FIA Group A Touring Car regulations. The championship was the fifth Australian Endurance Championship and the fourth to be awarded as a drivers title.

== Calendar ==
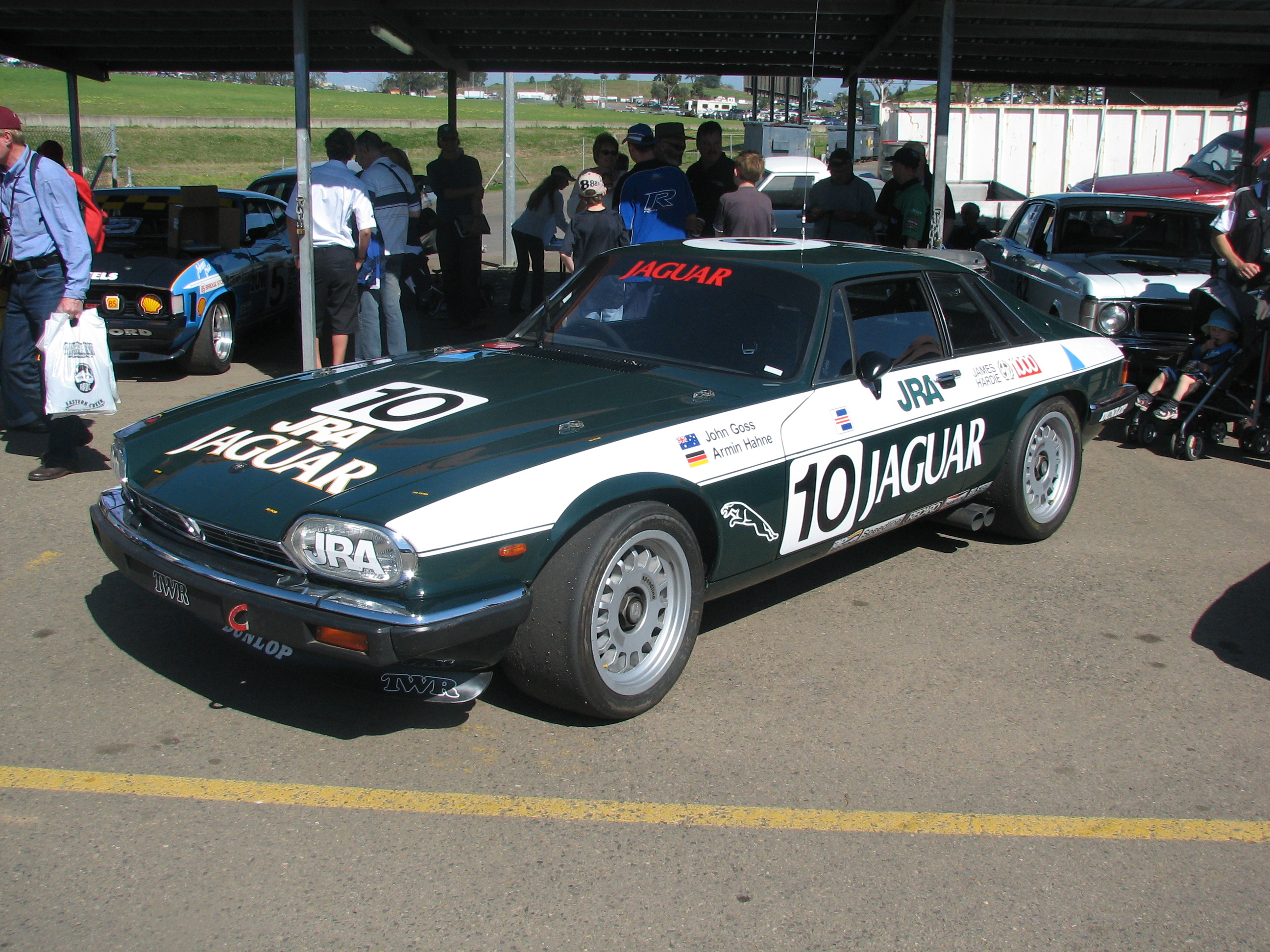
John Goss and Armin Hahne won the 1985 James Hardie 1000 driving a Jaguar XJ-S

The championship was contested over a five-round series which was staged concurrently with the 1985 Australian Manufacturers' Championship.

Rd.	Race title	Circuit	City / state	Date	Winner	Car	Team	Report
1	Better Brakes 300	Amaroo Park	Sydney, New South Wales	4 August	(New Zealand) Jim Richards	BMW 635 CSi	JPS Team BMW	Report
2	Pepsi 250	Oran Park	Sydney, New South Wales	18 August	(New Zealand) Jim Richards	BMW 635 CSi	JPS Team BMW	Report
3	Castrol 500	Sandown	Melbourne, Victoria	15 September	(New Zealand) Jim Richards (Australia) Tony Longhurst	BMW 635 CSi	JPS Team BMW	Report
4	James Hardie 1000	Mount Panorama	Bathurst, New South Wales	6 October	(Australia) John Goss (West Germany) Armin Hahne	Jaguar XJS	JRA Ltd.	Report
5	Motorcraft 300	Surfers Paradise	Surfers Paradise, Queensland	27 October	(New Zealand) Jim Richards	BMW 635 CSi	JPS Team BMW	Report

== Class Structure ==
Cars were grouped into three classes based on engine capacity:

- Up to 2000cc
- 2001 to 3000cc
- 3001 to 6000cc

== Points system ==
Championship points were allocated on a three scale system, to Australian license holders only, for outright places gained in each round:

- Scale A was applied to drivers of cars in the Up to 2000cc class
- Scale B was applied to drivers of cars in the 2001 to 3000cc class
- Scale C was applied to drivers of cars in the 3001 to 6000cc class

Outright Position	1	2	3	4	5	6	7	8	9	10	11	12	13	14	15	16	17	18	19	20
Scale A	30	27	24	21	19	17	15	14	13	12	11	10	9	8	7	6	5	4	3	2
Scale B	28	26	23	20	17	15	14	13	12	11	10	9	8	7	6	5	4	3	2	1
Scale C	25	23	20	17	15	13	11	10	9	8	7	6	5	4	3	2	1	-	-	-

In rounds where two drivers were compulsory (i.e. the Sandown and Bathurst rounds), full championship points were allocated to each of the two drivers provided that both had driven at least one third of the relevant distance. In all other rounds, where two drivers were not compulsory, points were allocated to each of the two drivers provided each had driven at least one third of the distance. If each had not driven such a distance, full points were allocated to the driver who had driven the greater distance. In all cases, points were only awarded to a driver who had driven one single car throughout the duration of the event.

== Results ==
Position	Driver	Car	Class	Entrant	R1	R2	R3	R4	R5	Total
1	(New Zealand) Jim Richards	BMW 635 CSi	3001-6000cc	JPS Team BMW	25	25	25	17	25	117
2	(Australia) Tony Longhurst	BMW 323i BMW 635 CSi	2001-3000cc 3001-6000cc	JPS Team BMW	15	11	25	17	-	68
3	(Australia) Colin Bond	Alfa Romeo GTV6	2001-3000cc	Network Alfa	17	15	20	13	-	65
4	(Australia) John Smith	Toyota Corolla	Up to 2000cc	Toyota Team Australia	15	10	-	5	19	49
5	(Australia) Peter Brock	Holden Commodore (VK)	3001-6000cc	Mobil Holden Dealer Team	20	23	-	-	-	43
6	(New Zealand) Kent Baigent	BMW 635 CSi	3001-6000cc	H. Kent Baigent	11.5	14	-	15	-	40.5
7	(Australia) Gregg Hansford	Alfa Romeo GTV6	2001-3000cc	Network Alfa	-	-	20	13	-	33
8	(Australia) Dick Johnson	Ford Mustang GT	3001-6000cc	Palmer Tube Mills	-	-	-	11	20	31
9	(New Zealand) Neal Lowe	BMW 635 CSi	3001-6000cc	H. Kent Baigent	11.5	-	-	15	-	26.5
=10	(Australia) John Goss	Jaguar XJ-S	3001-6000cc	JRA Ltd.	-	-	-	25	-	25
=10	(West Germany) Armin Hahne	Jaguar XJ-S	3001-6000cc	JRA Ltd.	-	-	-	25	-	25

Note: Only the top ten pointscorers are shown in the above table.
