= JPS Team BMW =

Australian motor racing team

- Manufacturer: BMW
- Team Principal: Frank Gardner
- Race Drivers: (Australia) Allan Grice (New Zealand) Jim Richards (Australia) Tony Longhurst (New Zealand) Neville Crichton (United Kingdom) David Hobbs (New Zealand) Denny Hulme (West Germany) Leopold Prinz von Bayern (New Zealand) Robbie Francevic (Australia) Kevin Bartlett (Australia) George Fury
- Chassis: BMW 635 CSi (1981-1986); BMW 323i (1985); BMW 325i (1986); BMW M3 (1987)
- Debut: 1981
- Drivers' Championships: 2 (1985, 1987)
- Round wins: 12
- 2nd (team)

JPS Team BMW was a former Australian motor racing team that ran from 1981–1987. The team's main focus was touring car racing but also ran in sports sedans and GT cars as well. The team, under the management of former British Touring Car Champion and Formula One racer Frank Gardner, was based in the Sydney suburb of Terrey Hills and completed almost all of their testing at the old Amaroo Park circuit with Gardner himself doing most of the test miles in the various BMW's the team raced.

== Australian Group C ==
=== 1981 ===
The team was born out of Allan Grice's Craven Mild Racing which had run Holden Toranas and Holden Commodores in the mid to late 1970s and into 1980. In 1981 CMR became the factory operation for BMW Australia running a Group C version of the 3.5 litre, 6cyl, BMW 635 CSi. The car would have a new paint scheme as well with the red, white and gold of Craven Mild replaced by the black and gold of John Player & Sons. Over the next seven seasons the black BMW's would become one of the most recognisable cars in Australian Touring Car Racing, with the 635 often used in adverts by both BMW Australia and sponsors JPS in the days before the government ban on Tobacco advertising in Australia.

For 1981, Allan Grice was the team's lead driver in the 635 CSi. Grice finished 2nd in the Amaroo Park based AMSCAR Series for cars with a maximum engine capacity of 3.5 litres (which excluded the V8 Commodores and Ford Falcons), and then went on to finish 7th in the crash shortened James Hardie 1000 partnered by British sports car driver David Hobbs. The relationship between Grice and Gardner had deteriorated during their six-year association which led to Gricey's removal from the team at the end of 1981 (most of the animosity was from Gardner allegedly not having a high opinion of Grice's aggressive driving style with Gardner preferring a more sensible approach. However, in many ways Grice's style was ahead of its time in Australia). Grice also claimed that Gardner used his influence to steal his long-time backer Craven Mild. Gardner then signed triple Bathurst 1000 winner, New Zealander Jim Richards, who would remain the team's lead driver until Gardner shut down operations at the end of 1987. This also left Grice without a drive and he later admitted he contemplated retirement until he was thrown a lifeline by Re-Car team owner Alan Browne in mid-1982.

=== 1982 ===
Despite CAMS upping the 635's minimum weight from 1280 kg to 1420 kg, JPS Team BMW scored their first podium when Richards finished 3rd in the final round of the 1982 Australian Touring Car Championship at Surfers Paradise (the only round of the ATCC contested by the team who again focused their efforts on the AMSCAR series which by now was open to all Group C touring cars). Richards then finished a disappointing 11th at the Castrol 400 at Sandown in the traditional lead up to Bathurst, but Bathurst produced a better result. Richards and David Hobbs would finish in a fine 5th place in the 1982 James Hardie 1000 after starting from only 19th position on the grid (the car actually finished 6th on the road but the 4th placed Dick Johnson / John French Ford Falcon was disqualified for illegal engine modifications).

The Richards / Hobbs 635 was the second BMW built by the team, which also entered their original car in the race for New Zealand's 1967 Formula One World Champion Denny Hulme (a long time friend of both Gardner and Richards) and Western Australian driver Stephen Brook. After qualifying 38th, the second car was retired after just 96 laps following a crash in The Cutting by Brook who ran wide while being lapped and hit the outside wall.

=== 1983 ===
After getting nothing in the annual 'concessions' handed out to various competing makes by CAMS, the team opted not to compete in the 1983 ATCC, instead Richards drove in the AMSCAR series and Gardner developing the car for the Australian Endurance Championship later in the year which would suit the BMW more than the sprint races. The testing and development, mostly carried out by team manager Gardner at Sydney's Amaroo Park, paid off as the BMW started to show its potential not only with improved reliability, but with extra horsepower giving much needed added speed. The horsepower came largely through the homologation of a 24-Valve head for the engine which boosted power from 300 bhp (224 kW; 304 PS) to a reported 390 bhp (291 kW; 395 PS). The power boost put the BMW's speed on par with the leading V8 Commodore's and Ford Falcon's, though the car was handicapped by poor front tyre wear and handling due to its 3.5 L straight-6 engine, which unlike the V8's hung partly over the front axle of the car. Richards finished seventh in the opening endurance round at Amaroo, but only managed 17th in the next round at Oran Park. The combination then came good Sandown's Castrol 400 where Richards finished second behind 1983 ATCC winner Allan Moffat in his Mazda RX-7.

At Sandown after the latest homologation period, the BMW was the only one of the top 5 outright makes which was not protested over the weekend, mostly because they were not seen as a true threat. Mazda, Ford, Holden and Nissan were all embroiled in some form of protest over the legality of parts, and Frank Gardner cheekily requested the JPS pits be moved away from the other top teams so they could get work done in peace due to the constant arguments going on around them. With Richard's second behind the dominant RX-7 of Moffat in the race and the failure of the leading Commodore, Falcon, and Nissan Bluebird turbo teams, suddenly JPS Team BMW were being talked about as a dark horse for the 1983 James Hardie 1000 at Bathurst.

Team manager Frank Gardner temporarily came out of retirement to partner Richards at Bathurst with the team only entering the one car in 1983 (the 52-year-old Gardner explained to the press that he had never lost his skills behind the wheel and had done all of the cars testing so he knew the 635 better than most, and that he would also only drive the lunch time stint. Though many believe the cunning Gardner saw a good opportunity to win the race himself, especially after the V8's with their homologation updates had failed to make an impact at Sandown, the traditional warmup event for Bathurst). The black BMW carried a RaceCam unit that had a periscope lens poking through the roof of the car. The 635's speed was shown on the 6.172 km Mount Panorama Circuit when Richards qualified fourth for the Hardies Heroes Top 10 runoff, and managed to maintain the position after the runoff which was cause for great optimism for the race. The race however was a complete disaster from the team. After a good start Richards suddenly started falling back on lap three and came straight into the pits. It was found that metal filings had somehow made their way into the fuel system of the car which would have meant a total strip, clean and rebuild of the entire fuel system just to get back into the race. The team did manage to get the car back onto the track, but it managed only another three laps and was sadly retired after completing just six laps.

Gardner would later claim that he believed the car had been sabotaged although he did not know by who and wouldn't speculate on the reason, though the car not being Australian made and its cigarette sponsorship were popular theories at the time. However, as the cigarette sponsored Holden Dealer Team (Marlboro) and Allan Moffat's Mazda team (Peter Stuyvesant) who finished Bathurst in first and second respectively were not targeted, some felt the car being European was a more likely reason. At the time, the long-held Holden and Ford V8 domination of Group C touring car racing in Australia was under serious threat with factory-backed teams from foreign manufacturers the likes of the European BMW, and Japanese marques Mazda and Nissan, and this was unpopular with not only the fans, but some within the sport itself (Moffat's ATCC win was the first by a Japanese car, while George Fury put the Bluebird turbo onto the front row at Bathurst. There were also claims from high-profile drivers such as Allan Grice that the Mazda RX-7 was a sports sedan and not a touring car and should not have been allowed to race). The claim of sabotage is actually disputed by Jim Richards and the team's chief mechanic Pip Barker who believe that the dirty fuel could have been a combination of things.

Following the James Hardie, Richards went on to finish 11th at the Surfers Paradise 300, and 9th in the Humes Guardrail 300 at the Adelaide International Raceway. All this gave Richards second place in the Endurance Championship with a total of 67 points, only five points behind winner Peter McLeod in his Mazda RX-7. Between the Surfers and Adelaide races, Richards drove the car in the 40 lap support race at the 1983 Australian Grand Prix meeting at Calder Park. The race, which included a compulsory pit stop, saw Richards finish 4th.

=== 1984 ===
JPS Team BMW competed in its first full Australian Touring Car Championship in 1984 with Richards finishing in fifth place with a best of third again at Surfers Paradise. Richards also scored the team's first ever pole position during the championship when he qualified fastest for Round 6 at Lakeside in Brisbane.

Tony Longhurst joined the team as Richard's co-driver for the Castrol 500 at Sandown and the last ever James Hardie 1000 for the local Group C Touring Cars (Australian touring car racing was adopt the FIA's international Group A rules from 1 January 1985). Unfortunately both races were a disaster for the team. After starting 6th at Sandown, the BMW was a DNF with a broken diff on lap 72.

The team again expanded to two cars for the James Hardie 1000 and alongside the Group C Car, entered a Group A spec 635 for Denny Hulme and Bavarian Prince Leopold von Bayern. The team's progress was hampered during race week at Bathurst when the Prince crashed the Group A car at the top of the mountain, a legacy of going too quick too soon on cold tyres and an unfamiliar mountain circuit. The effort into fixing the car put the Group C challenger about a day behind schedule, though Richards still managed to qualify the car sixth in Hardies Heroes with a time two seconds quicker than he had managed in 1983. Despite BMW's touted reliability it would be a short race for the Richards/Longhurst car which suffered a blown engine on just lap 39, again leaving Longhurst without a drive after he also missed out at Sandown. The Hulme/von Bayern car fared much better though, qualifying 49th (third in class, but 5.3 seconds slower than the Group A leading TWR Rover Vitesse and 12 seconds slower than Richards). In the race the car's only problem was a flat tyre and Hulme and von Bayern had a steady run to finish second in class and 15th outright. The Group A car also carried a Racecam unit from TV broadcaster Channel 7 which was mounted in the headlight of the car, with both drivers able to talk to the TV commentators while driving in the race. For the normally quiet Hulme who had a career dating back to the early 1950s in his native New Zealand, it was the first time he had ever talked on television while actually driving in the race.

Bathurst would be the last Group C race for the team. With no chance of winning or placing in the 1984 Australian Endurance Championship, JPS Team BMW decided to skip the final round at Surfers Paradise. The team did race in the Australian Grand Prix support race at Calder (which was the final competitive Group C race on the Australian mainland), but it entered the Group A BMW for Richards to drive with an eye firmly on developing the car for 1985.

== Group A ==
=== 1985 ===
In its Group C specification, while often fast, the 635 CSi was not the race winner that it was in Group A racing in Europe. The team (more to the point, Frank Gardner) always told anyone who would listen to wait for Group A to take over in Australia and they would show everyone how good the BMW 635 CSi really was. While many scoffed at this suggestion, it proved very accurate with Richards and the BMW winning the first ever ATCC run under international Group A rules in 1985, which included winning the first Group A only race in Australia, the first round of the ATCC at the tight Winton Motor Raceway. Richards went on to win seven of the series' ten races, including a record six in a row. In a golden year for JPS Team BMW, Richards also went undefeated in the AMSCAR Series and then won the 1985 Australian Endurance Championship, winning five out of six races including the Castrol 500 at Sandown where Richards and Longhurst came from a lap down to pass their teammates George Fury and Neville Crichton for the lead with only a few laps remaining after the car had died on Richards early in the race due to an easily fixed electrical fault (the team anticipated such a fault and actually put the spare part needed in the 635's glovebox, with the drivers instructed on how to fix it away from the pits if needed).

The team only missed out at Bathurst when Richards finished in fourth place partnered with Longhurst after being delayed for three laps in a sand trap when Richards spun on oil. The team's second car, driven by car owner Crichton who had also driven the car in the ATCC and finished in fourth in his championship debut, and on-loan Nissan Motorsport driver George Fury, finished second at Sandown after leading until late in the race when Crichton was slowed by a reported shortage of fuel. In a twist of fate, as Richards was sliding off into the sand trap at Bathurst, George Fury, who Richards had just lapped, joined him having gone off on the same oil. The second car only completed 68 laps before being retired with engine failure which was attributed to the amount of sand the engine had 'swallowed' in the sand trap.

=== 1986 ===
For the 1986 championship, Richards was in a new 635 CSi, with a more powerful engine, better chassis, bigger brakes and the new 16" BBS wheels, while Longhurst drove the team's newest car, a BMW 325i. Unfortunately for the team newer cars such as a much more powerful and durable Holden VK Commodore SS Group A, and the turbocharged Nissan Skyline DR30 had been introduced into the championship, while the fast Volvo 240T also had further development. The high-revving BMW straight-6 in the 635 did not have the power to allow Richards to successfully defend his title. One of the biggest issues were the bigger cams now fitted, that gave more top-end power, but made the car very hard to get off the line. The engine was designed for the European races where they had rolling starts, but problematic when there were no rolling starts in Australia (Only the Calder endurance round had a rolling start). He only managed one win at Winton while finishing third in the championship. Richards actually finished second at Winton, but the winning Skyline of Gary Scott was disqualified post-race for oversized brakes. Another reported problem the team had was their Pirelli tyres weren't suited to Australia's warmer weather causing them to not work as well as the same tyres were working in Europe. It was not until midway through 1986 that the team were able to get Pirelli tyres better suited to Australian conditions. At both the Castrol 500 and at Bathurst, the BMW was outgunned by the more powerful V8s and turbos with Richards & Longhurst partnered to finish both races in 5th and 6th respectively. The team's second car (another 635) was driven by Kevin Bartlett and Trevor Crowe who failed to finish both endurance races. But overall Jim Richards and this final evolution of the JPS 635csi were to win the Australian Endurance Championship, a combination of the Amaroo (1st), Surfers Paradise (2nd), Sandown (5th), Bathurst (6th), Calder (3rd) and Oran Park (2nd) endurance races. It was the final farewell to this iconic JPS race machine.

=== 1987 ===
1987 saw the old 635 CSi finally retired as BMW's flagship touring car racer. It was replaced by the BMW M3, which unlike the 635 CSi was much more of a purpose built race car, powered by a high-revving 2.3 litre, 4cyl engine. The team built a total of 6 M3's for a full assault on the 1987 Australian Touring Car Championship for Richards and Longhurst, with Richards marking the M3's world debut by putting the little car on pole for the opening round of the ATCC at Calder Park. The 2.3L M3 was in theory only a middle class car that was built for the longer races of the World and European touring car championships, however due to the combination of the M3's high revving engine (which produced approximately 300 bhp (224 kW; 304 PS)), light weight (940 kg (2,070 lb)), large brakes and superb handling saw it easily match and often beat the outright class cars in 1987.

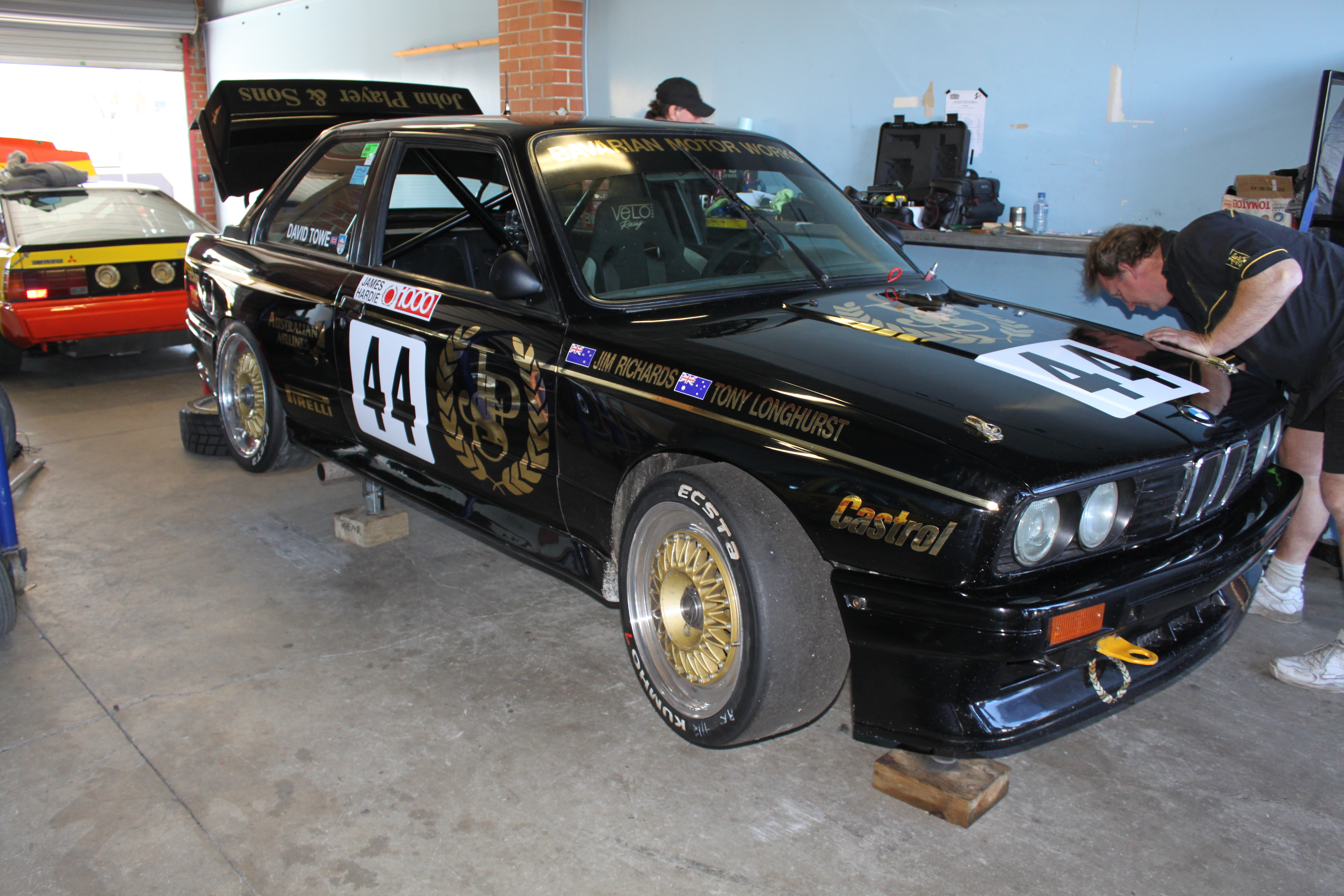
JPS Team BMW M3 of Jim Richards and Tony Longhurst which finished 4th outright and first in class at the 1987 James Hardie 1000. Pictured in 2012

Early on, despite pole for Richards at Calder, and a surprising second at Symmons Plains, a track known as a power circuit thanks to its long, curving back straight, the new M3's hampered by having to use the less sophisticated 325i suspension due to the unavailability of parts from Europe where the car had been in high demand. This changed for Round 6 at Surfers when Richards had a brand new 1987 spec M3. One the one Australian circuit in the series that most resembled the fast, flowing circuits of Europe for which the car was originally built, Richards drove away for an easy win. Although he failed to finish the next race at Sandown due to a rare engine failure after he had damaged the sump in a first lap incident while avoiding an out of control car, this brought him within reach of the Nissan Skyline of young charger Glenn Seton. The ATCC went down to the last race at Oran Park where after a slow Start, Richards moved through the field and after a battle with Seton, emerged victorious and won his second ATCC.

The team then competed in Australia's end of season endurance events as well as the Australian and New Zealand rounds of the 1987 World Touring Car Championship season. Richards and Longhurst combined to win the Pepsi 250 at Oran Park while repeating their 1985 result by finishing 4th at Bathurst. The team's second M3 was driven by 1986 ATCC winner Robbie Francevic from New Zealand and the team's engine builder who had also driven in the last two rounds of the ATCC, Ludwig Finauer. Francevic & Finauer finished in 5th place at the Sandown 500 and 6th at Bathurst.

The win in the Pepsi 250 would prove to be the final ever race win for JPS Team BMW. Its first win came when Allan Grice won the opening race of the 1981 AMSCAR series.

Following the 1987 season team boss Frank Gardner decided to retire from motor racing at the age of 57, although he would make a comeback of sorts in 1988 when he became Team Manager/consultant for Longhurst's newly formed team Tony Longhurst Racing running a Ford Sierra RS500. When Gardner retired he effectively shut down operations of JPS Team BMW. The team assets, including the M3's were then sold to Mobil 1 Racing. Peter Brock's team also took over as the factory supported BMW team in Australia while Jim Richards joined the Mobil 1 team for 1988. By this time however, the M3 was no longer competitive in the shorter sprint races of the ATCC against the high powered Ford Sierra RS500, though consistency and high attrition from the highly strung turbo Fords saw Richards finish fourth in the championship.

JPS Team BMW is the only team ever to win the Australian Touring Car Championship, the Australian Manufacturers' Championship and Australian Endurance Championship for BMW.

== Sports Sedans ==
JPS Team BMW also ran a BMW 318i Turbo (updated by 1984 to a 320i) in the Australian Sports Sedan Championship and later in the Australian GT Championship (the car started its life in Craven Mild colours in 1980). The turbocharged 318i proved to be fast but fragile in the hands of Allan Grice who usually gave unfavorable reports on the cars handling, with the usual complaint being that the power of the engine was causing the chassis to flex and twist, something that even track marshals noticed at times according to Grice.

The car was sold to sports sedan racer Bruce Lynton in late 1981 and a new car was built in its place. The new car was taken over by Richards when he joined the team who raced it with moderate success. Richards actually finished equal second in the 1983 GT championship after winning the opening two rounds at Lakeside and Sandown, before it was badly damaged in a start line crash at Adelaide in Round 3. The crash, which took out one-third of the field, was caused by the Chevrolet Monza of Peter Brock which suddenly turned left, directly into the path of the oncoming traffic. The damage saw the team put the car away for almost the rest of the year to concentrate on developing the 635 CSi touring car, though Richards did drive the repaired car (complete with a racecam unit for Channel 7) in the Sports Car / GT Challenge support races at the 1983 Australian Grand Prix at Calder Park Raceway in November.

The car's last race before being sold was at the 1984 Sandown 1000 which was part of the 1984 World Sportscar Championship season. The only change the team made to the car for the race was upgrading it to a 320i plus the removal of the high powered turbo engine, in its place the team put in a much less powerful, but much more reliable naturally aspirated 2.0 litre 4cyl BMW motor. In what was the first ever World Championship motor race ever held in Australia, the gamble on the motor paid off as Richards and Longhurst finished in 14th place (first in class), 28 laps behind the winning Rothmans Porsche 956 of 1984 WSC Drivers' Champion Stefan Bellof and (then) three times 24 Hours of Le Mans winner Derek Bell. Richards had qualified the BMW in 22nd with a time of 1:44.400 for the 3.878 km (1.928 mi) circuit. This was exactly six seconds slower than the AC class leading Romano WE84 of Alfredo Costanzo and the cars owner, 1984 Australian Sports Car Champion Bap Romano (unlike the BMW, the Romano was a purpose built Group A Sports Car that was powered by an ex-McLaren Formula One Cosworth DFV V8 engine and featured ground effects aerodynamics), and 12.8 seconds slower than Bellof's pole time in his factory Rothmans Porsche.

== Accolades ==
By winning the 1985 ATCC, JPS Team BMW became the first team to win the ATCC with a European made car since it became a series instead of a single race in 1969. It was also the first time a European made car had won the ATCC since Bob Jane had won the 1963 Championship driving a Jaguar Mark 2. It was also the first ATCC win for BMW and the first for a 6 cyl car since Peter Brock had used a Holden LJ Torana GTR XU-1 for part of the 1974 series. The team also introduced centre lock wheels to Australian touring car racing in 1983. Despite the time saved by only having one nut to change per wheel compared to the five it previously had, chief mechanic Pip Barker described pit stops for the cars as a nightmare due to the weight of the air guns used (the much larger air guns of the early 80s were heavy enough to be almost too heavy to be picked up by one hand) and the amount of compressed air they required to work.

During its time in touring car racing, the team won 12 ATCC races and two championships between its first ATCC race in 1981, and its last in 1987. It also won numerous rounds of the AMSCAR series, as well as winning the series each year from 1985–87 and being runner up in 1981. It was also twice winner of the Australian Endurance Championship in 1985 and 1986, and was runner up in the championship in 1983.

== Drivers ==
Those who drove for JPS Team BMW between 1981 and 1987 are as follows (in order of appearance):

- (Australia) Allan Grice
- (United Kingdom) David Hobbs
- (New Zealand) Jim Richards
- (New Zealand) Denny Hulme
- (Australia) Stephen Brook
- (Australia) Frank Gardner
- (Australia) Tony Longhurst
- (West Germany) Prince Leopold von Bayern
- (New Zealand) Neville Crichton
- (Australia) George Fury
- (Australia) Kevin Bartlett
- (New Zealand) Trevor Crowe
- (West Germany) Ludwig Finauer
- (New Zealand) Robbie Francevic

== Championship results ==
Season	Series	Position	Car	Driver
1981	Australian Sports Sedan Championship	5th	BMW 318i turbo	Allan Grice
1981	Better Brakes AMSCAR Series	2nd	BMW 635 CSi	Allan Grice
1981	Australian Touring Car Championship	12th	BMW 635 CSi	Allan Grice
1982	Australian Touring Car Championship	22nd	BMW 635 CSi	Jim Richards
1982	Better Brakes AMSCAR Series	9th	BMW 635 CSi	Jim Richards
1982	Australian Endurance Championship	36th	BMW 635 CSi	Jim Richards
1982	Australian GT Championship	13th	BMW 318i turbo	Jim Richards
1983	Australian GT Championship	2nd	BMW 318i turbo	Jim Richards
1983	Australian Endurance Championship	2nd	BMW 635 CSi	Jim Richards
1984	Australian Touring Car Championship	5th	BMW 635 CSi	Jim Richards
1984	Better Brakes AMSCAR Series	3rd	BMW 635 CSi	Jim Richards
1984	World Sportscar Championship	NC	BMW 320i	Jim Richards; Tony Longhurst
1985	Australian Touring Car Championship	1st	BMW 635 CSi	Jim Richards
1985	Australian Touring Car Championship	16th	BMW 323i	Tony Longhurst
1985	Better Brakes AMSCAR Series	1st	BMW 635 CSi	Jim Richards
1985	Australian Endurance Championship	1st	BMW 635 CSi	Jim Richards
1985	Australian Endurance Championship	2nd	BMW 323i BMW 635 CSi	Tony Longhurst
1986	Australian Touring Car Championship	3rd	BMW 635 CSi	Jim Richards
1986	Australian Touring Car Championship	4th	BMW 325i	Tony Longhurst
1986	Better Brakes/AMSCAR Series	1st	BMW 325i	Tony Longhurst
1986	Better Brakes/AMSCAR Series	3rd	BMW 635 CSi	Jim Richards
1986	Australian Endurance Championship	1st	BMW 635 CSi	Jim Richards
1986	Australian Endurance Championship	3rd	BMW 325i BMW 635 CSi	Tony Longhurst
1987	Australian Touring Car Championship	1st	BMW M3	Jim Richards
1987	Australian Touring Car Championship	4th	BMW M3	Tony Longhurst
1987	Better Brakes/AMSCAR Series	1st	BMW M3	Tony Longhurst

== Endurance racing wins ==
Touring car outright and class wins in endurance racing by the team include:

- 1985 Better Brakes 300 (Amaroo Park) - Jim Richards in a BMW 635 CSi.
- 1985 Pepsi 250 (Oran Park Raceway) - Jim Richards in a BMW 635 CSi.
- 1985 Castrol 500 (Sandown Raceway) - Jim Richards and Tony Longhurst in a BMW 635 CSi.
- 1985 Motorcraft 300 (Surfers Paradise International Raceway) - Jim Richards in a BMW 635 CSi.
- 1986 Better Brakes 300 (Amaroo Park) - Jim Richards in a BMW 635 CSi.
- 1986 Better Brakes 300 (Amaroo Park) - Tony Longhurst in a BMW 325i (2nd outright, 1st in Class B)
- 1987 Hardie Irrigation 100 (Amaroo Park) - Jim Richards in a BMW M3.
- 1987 Pepsi 250 (Oran Park Raceway) - Jim Richards and Tony Longhurst in a BMW M3.
- 1987 James Hardie 1000 (Mount Panorama Circuit) - Jim Richards and Tony Longhurst in a BMW M3 (4th outright, 1st in Class 2).
