= Colin Bond Racing =

Australian motor racing team

- Manufacturer: Alfa Romeo (1984–87); Ford (1988–92); Toyota (1991–93)
- Team Principal: Colin Bond
- Race Drivers: Colin Bond (1984–93); Alfredo Costanzo (1984); Alan Jones (1985, 88); Gregg Hansford (1985); Peter Fitzgerald (1986); Warwick Rooklyn (1986); Lucio Cesario (1986–87); John Giddings (1988); Bruce Stewart (1988–89); Ken Matthews (1989–90); Domenic Beninca (1989); Graeme Crosby (1990–91); John Smith (1992–93); Terry Bosnjak (1992–93); Peter Hopwood (1992); Neal Bates (1993)
- Chassis: Alfa Romeo Alfetta GTV6; Alfa Romeo 75; Ford Sierra RS500; Toyota Corolla FX-GT E90; Toyota Corolla Seca AE93
- Debut: 1984
- Round wins: 2
- 2nd (Smith), 3rd (Bond)

Colin Bond Racing was an Australian motor racing team that competed in the Australian Touring Car Championship between 1984 and 1993.

== History ==
=== Alfa Romeo ===
After years of racing for other teams, including the factory backed Holden Dealer Team (1969–1976) and Allan Moffat's factory backed Ford team (1977–1978), then being basically a driver-for-hire until 1983, Colin Bond founded Colin Bond Racing in 1984 by as the factory distributor-supported Alfa Romeo team through the Australia and New Zealand distributor, Network Alfa. The team initially built an Alfa Romeo Alfetta GTV6 to run in the Group E Series Production "Super Series" before the car was upgraded for the Sandown 500 and James Hardie 1000 to run in the new to Australia Group A international touring car category. A second GTV6 was purchased from the Belgium based Luigi Racing team and added for the start of the 1985 Australian Touring Car Championship with former world champion Alan Jones driving the car until he returned to Formula One in mid-1985, following which Gregg Hansford took over Jones' position in the team for the final round of the ATCC and as Bond's co-driver in the endurance races. The team was initially sponsored by Ignis Fridges as a secondary sponsor to Network Alfa.

Driving the full Group A car, Jones proved something of a giant-killer in the early rounds of the 1985 ATCC, often running with the more powerful V8 Holden Commodores and Ford Mustang GTs as well as the turbocharged Volvo 240T and the BMW 635 CSi. Bond on the other hand in the converted Group E car couldn't match the pace of his illustrious team mate. When Jones left to return to Formula One, Bond sold the original Group E/A car and ran the Luigi bought GTV6 in the rest of the ATCC, putting in much improved performances including a surprise pole position for the Amaroo Park round. He then campaigned the car in the endurance races until a crash in a 300 KM race at the Surfers Paradise International Raceway. Prior to the Surfers race, Bond and Hansford finished 8th outright and 1st in Class B at the 1985 James Hardie 1000.

For 1986, two more GTV6's were acquired from Luigi with Bond running one in the 1986 ATCC before running the second car in the endurance races.

In 1987, the team replaced the now outdated GTV6 with the new Alfa Romeo 75 turbo, complete with new major sponsorship from Caltex. Like the team's second GTV6 in 1985, the Alfa 75 was purchased from the Luigi team, though unlike the GTV6, Bond's team found a number of problems with the new car. Development work on the car throughout the season, including switching it from being left hand to right hand drive which allowed the use of a better exhaust system, brought power up to approximately 320 bhp (239 kW; 324 PS). The team had begun to come to grips with the car and a good showing was hoped for at the 1987 James Hardie 1000 at Bathurst, though the race turned to a nightmare for the team after Bond's co-driver Lucio Cesario destroyed the front of the Alfa when he launched the car over Skyline and clouted the wall above The Dipper.

Bond finished his association with Alfa Romeo by qualifying 4th for the South Pacific Touring Car Championship Group A support race at the 1987 Australian Grand Prix in Adelaide. After a steady race, Colin Bond finished in 5th place.

The Alfa 75 turbo was a Class 2 car in the WTCC and an Under 2500cc in Australia. In both cases it was in the same class as the 2.3 Litre, naturally aspirated BMW M3. However, despite the 75 having approximately 20 bhp (15 kW; 20 PS) more than the BMW, the results were vastly different. Like most Group A cars until 1987, the Alfa was a road car adapted for touring car racing. The BMW however (like the Ford Sierra RS500) had been conceived as a race car that was put into production as a road car purely for homologation purposes, changing the landscape for Group A racing.

=== Ford ===
Following Alfa Romeo's withdrawal from motorsport in mid-1987, the team switched to Ford Sierra RS500's from 1988. Highlights in the first year included third place in the 1988 ATCC, winning the AMSCAR series and a third place at the 1988 Tooheys 1000 with Alan Jones (despite a down on power engine thanks to scrutineers impounding the teams best turbocharger following what turned out to be an illegal protest lodged by Tom Walkinshaw against the Australian built Sierras). The team achieved consecutive round wins in 1990 at Lakeside and Mallala. Bond's win at Lakeside in 1990 was his first Australian Touring Car Championship race win since 1978 while his win at Mallala was his 10th and last ATCC victory.

Driving the Sierra (one of 1987's OXO Supercubes cars on loan from Don Smith), Bond and his 1988 co-driver Alan Jones also finished joint second in the 1988 Asia-Pacific Touring Car Championship despite only competing in three of the four rounds (Bathurst, Wellington and Pukekohe) and only finishing in two of them (Bathurst and Wellington) while missing the final round at Fuji in Japan.

Bond's Caltex sponsored team expanded to two cars for the 1988 Endurance races at Oran Park, Sandown and Bathurst with the second car run by fellow Sydney veterans Bruce Stewart and John Giddings (the second car was part of the deal done with Don Smith early in 1988). Ken Matthews (another Sydney veteran) joined Bond's team in 1989 and 1990, running the 1988 Bathurst 1000 winning Ford Sierra he had purchased from Tony Longhurst.

=== Toyota ===
1991 saw the team branch out into Group E Production Car racing with a succession of Toyotas, Toyota MR2s and Toyota Celicas. Long time Toyota drivers John Smith and Neal Bates joined Bond in a succession of campaigns which were later run by Smith and/or Bates. In 1993, the team expanded its involvement with Toyota, competing in the 2-litre championship fielding a two-car team of Toyota Corollas. John Smith commenced the season in a 1990 Toyota Team Australia built 1.6-litre Corolla FX-GT while Bond developed the new 2.0 litre BTCC specification Corolla Seca.

Smith's FX-GT was unable to match the speed of M3 Motorsport's BMW M3s while Bond was fast but unreliable in the new Seca. Once both new cars were completed, reliability had improved to the point where Smith was taking wins away from Peter Doulman's M3. A dramatic winner-take-all championship finale at Oran Park saw Doulman's BMW win the title after a controversial collision between Smith's race leading Corolla Seca and Doulman's team mate John Cotter. Smith and Bond ended the series second and third. The team were again beaten by M3 Motorsport at the Bathurst 1000 with both Corollas retiring from the race.

The team closed at the end of 1993 as a motor racing team, but continued its involvement in the new 2.0 litre touring car class as a constructor. One of its Corollas moved on to the Inspired Racing team. The team used the Corolla builds as the basis for the construction of a pair of Hyundai Lantras for the factory-supported Steve Hardman Motorsport team in 1994 and 1995.
