= Robbie Francevic =

New Zealand racing driver (1941–2026)

Robert James Francevic (born Franičević; 18 September 1941 – 4 July 2026) was a New Zealand racing driver who featured prominently in both New Zealand and Australia during the 1970s and 1980s. His biggest wins were the inaugural Wellington 500 street race in Wellington, New Zealand in 1985 driving a Volvo 240T, and the 1986 Australian Touring Car Championship, also in a 240T. Francevic's win in the 1986 ATCC was the first and only ATCC win by a non-Australian resident.

== Career ==
Francevic started his motor racing career in 1966, when he and his team designed and built the "Colour Me Gone" Custaxie in which he won twenty races and the 1967 New Zealand Saloon Car Championship. During the 1970s, Francevic was also a regular competitor in Formula 5000 racing, racing in the Tasman Series as well as the Rothmans International Series.

Francevic was the winner of the 1983 Benson & Hedges touring car series in NZ.

Following the 1985 Wellington 500, Francevic, while still living in Auckland, contested the 1985 Australian Touring Car Championship driving the Volvo 240T for owner and friend Mark Petch. Despite the speed he had shown in the NZ series, and that the Volvos were winning races in the European Touring Car Championship, Francevic shocked Australian race fans when his turbo Volvo beat established stars Peter Brock, Dick Johnson and Jim Richards by winning the third round of the ATCC at Symmons Plains in Tasmania, before going on to dominate the final round at Oran Park in Sydney.

Other than Richards, Francevic was the only multiple race winner in the championship. Richards won seven times, Francevic won two, and Brock won one.

Following the ATCC, and on Francevic's suggestion, Mark Petch recruited 1984 and 1985 Australian Drivers' Champion John Bowe to partner Francevic in the 1985 Castrol 500 at Sandown in Melbourne. After a strong showing, the car finished its race with Bowe at the wheel at the entrance to the pits with a seized diff (the car was pushed into pitlane with a jack holding the rear tyres off the ground).

In 1986, Francevic became the first New Zealand resident to win the ATCC, becoming the second New Zealander (after Jim Richards in 1985) to win the series, and recording the only series win to date for Volvo. Francevic won the first two races of the season at Amaroo Park and Symmons Plains, finished second at Sandown to the Nissan Skyline of George Fury, and won again at Adelaide after runaway leader Peter Brock blew the engine in his Holden Commodore late in the race. This would prove to be his last win for the series and coincided with new team management, former Holden Dealer Team boss from the late 1970s John Shepherd was put in charge of the team following the sale of the team by Mark Petch Motorsport to Volvo Australia to form the Volvo Dealer Team. The Volvo was overtaken in speed by the Nissan turbo's and despite a newly built 240T appearing mid-season, Francevic was often slower than Bowe in qualifying but still scored enough points to win the championship from Fury by just five points.

Following the ATCC, Francevic was not happy with Shepherd's management of the team, nor was Shepherd happy with Francevic. Robbie was happy to have won the championship, but wanted to win from the front and driving for points like he was forced to over the latter part of the championship didn't suit his flamboyant, hard charging style. Tensions between Francevic and Shepherd came to a head at the 1986 Sandown 500. With the Volvo he was to drive with fellow Kiwi Graham McRae not having run in practice or qualifying due to the late build time, Francevic refused to race the car believing it (and the team's second car which was in the same situation) would not be competitive. While the John Bowe / Alfredo Costanzo Volvo failed to finish, its fastest race lap was identical to the winning Nissan Skyline of George Fury and Glenn Seton. Following his refusal to drive the car and his comments to the assembled media about the situation on the morning of the race, Francevic was fired from the Volvo Dealer Team on 15 September 1986, the day after the Sandown 500.

== Bathurst 1000 ==
At the 1985 Bathurst 1000, Francevic teamed with John Bowe in the Volvo and qualified fifth, his attempt at pole position in the Hardies Heroes top 10 run-off was thwarted by a flat tyre on his second run while trying to improve on his first run. With a very quick car and a strong diver pairing (Bowe, who like Francevic was on his first visit to Mount Panorama, was matching the Kiwi's times and it was only a late charge on qualifying tyres that saw Francevic post the quicker time), the pair considered one of the pre-race favourites along with the Tom Walkinshaw Racing Jaguar XJS', as it was thought the turbocharged Volvo was the only car capable of matching the speed of the V12 powered Jaguars. After a strong early showing in the race in which Francevic had held second for some time behind early leader Tom Walkinshaw, a failed alternator diode put them many laps down. The car finally retired on lap 122 when it ran out of fuel on the run up Mountain Straight.

After winning the 1986 ATCC and his much publicised falling out with the Volvo Dealer Team, Francevic drove Andy Rouse's former British Touring Car Championship (BTCC) winning Ford Sierra XR4Ti for former Volvo team owner Mark Petch to little success in the 1986 Bathurst 1000 with fellow Kiwi Leo Leonard, the car suffering terminal electrical problems on lap 26. Rather boldly, Francevic publicly predicted the turbo Ford would take pole position for the race, but the Kiwi pairing could only manage 21st on the grid with a time of 2:23.05 after a troubled practice and qualifying trying to get the car to run properly (despite the car being almost trouble free in pre-race testing). The time was 5.89 seconds behind the pole winning time set by Gary Scott's Nissan Skyline, and was 6.89 seconds slower than the Commodore of Allan Grice who set provisional pole time in qualifying. Francevic made his bold claim after the speed that the 2.3 litre turbocharged Sierras had shown in the FIA Touring Car Championship in Europe raced by Eggenberger Motorsport, and by the fact that Rouse had used the car to win the 1985 BTCC.

After sitting out most of 1987 without a drive, Francevic was drafted by Frank Gardner to co-drive the second of the JPS Team BMW's M3s at the Sandown 500 and Bathurst 1000, which (Bathurst) for 1987 had become a round of the World Touring Car Championship. Driving with the team's engine builder come driver Ludwig Finaur, Francevic finished fifth at Sandown before going on to his best ever Bathurst finish with sixth outright and second in class. During the race rain storms that hit late at Bathurst, Francevic, unable to see through a fogged up windscreen, accidentally ran over a pit lane marshal when coming into the pits, thankfully without any injury reported. The marshal wrote an official complaint to the race stewards over the incident, but due to the circumstances no action was taken.

For 1988, Francevic and long time backer Mark Petch secured a Ford Sierra RS500 from Walter Wolf Racing in West Germany to run in the 1988 Australian Touring Car Championship, but only started one race (Round 3 at Winton) and was excluded before practice of Round 5 in Adelaide due to illegal build components on the Sierra and the championship run was abandoned in the effort to get the car right (Wolf racing had built the Sierra to European Touring Car Championship (ETCC) standards which allegedly included a more liberal interpretation of the Group A rules than the Confederation of Australian Motor Sport (CAMS) allowed in Australia). At the time, Francevic claimed that CAMS were trying to drum him out of the championship and that his sponsorship deals were only valid if he raced. As a result of not racing, the team did in fact lose its major sponsor and another needed to be found. The team then fronted with a new Sierra (also built by Wolf but with stricter adherence to the rules), and a new major sponsor in New Zealand confectionery company Whittaker's was found in time for the 1988 Tooheys 1000 at Bathurst where Robbie teamed with Wolf Racing's lead driver and 1985 Bathurst winner Armin Hahne. Two engine failures in practice saw them only qualify 14th while overheating finished their race on lap 103 after running strongly in the top 3 for most of the previous 70 laps.

After winning the 1989 New Zealand Touring Car Championship, making him the only driver to have won both the ATCC and NZTC, Francevic had a couple of shake down runs in the Sierra during the 1989 ATCC, finishing in 15th place at a wet Winton before having a relatively quiet drive to 9th in the series Grand Final at Oran Park. Robbie then teamed with 1985 ETCC champion, Italian ex-Formula One driver Gianfranco Brancatelli, in the Petch owned Sierra in the 1989 Bathurst 1000. The car was qualified 15th, but Francevic didn't get a drive after the right front wheel fell off the car under Brancatelli on lap 14 when going across the top of the Mountain. Having to drive the car back to the pits for over half a lap resulted in too much damage being done to the car's axle and front suspension (as they hadn't caught it on camera, race broadcaster Channel 7 initially reported that the black Sierra had hit a wall, but it turned out that the wheel had parted company with the car and that Brancatelli had actually managed to keep it off the wall).

After again winning the New Zealand Touring Car Championship in 1990, Francevic had his last start at Mount Panorama in the 1990 Tooheys 1000, this time teamed with fellow Kiwi racer Andrew Bagnall in Bagnall's own Sierra RS500. Bagnall qualified the car 17th and the pair drove well all day to finish seventh outright in a race in which many of the more fancied big budget Sierra teams either failed to finish or ran into problems which put them well out of contention.

== Personal life and death ==
Robert James Franičević was born in Auckland, New Zealand on 18 September 1941. He died in Takapuna on 4 July 2026, at the age of 84, and was survived by his wife, Rosita.

== Accolades ==
Francevic was an inaugural member of the MotorSport New Zealand Wall of Fame in 1994.

== Career results ==
=== Complete Australian Touring Car Championship results ===
(key) (Races in bold indicate pole position) (Races in italics indicate fastest lap)

Year	Team	Car	1	2	3	4	5	6	7	8	9	10	DC	Points
1985	(New Zealand) Mark Petch Motorsport	Volvo 240T	WIN	SAN; 6	**SYM**; 1	WAN; 9	AIR; Ret	CAL; 7	SUR; 2	LAK; 4	AMA; Ret	ORA; 1	5th	142
1986	(New Zealand) Mark Petch Motorsport	Volvo 240T	AMA; 1	SYM; 1									1st	217
1986	(Australia) Volvo Dealer Team	Volvo 240T			SAN; 2	AIR; 1	WAN; 3	SUR; 2	CAL; Ret	LAK; 4	WIN; 3	ORA; 6	1st	217
1988	(New Zealand) Robbie Francevic	Ford Sierra RS500	CAL	SYM	WIN; Ret	WAN	AIR; DNS	LAK	SAN	AMA	ORA		NC	0
1989	(New Zealand) Mark Petch Motorsport	Ford Sierra RS500	AMA; DNS	SYM	LAK	WAN	MAL	SAN	WIN; 15	ORA; 9			20th	2

=== Complete World Touring Car Championship results ===
(key) (Races in bold indicate pole position) (Races in italics indicate fastest lap)

Year	Team	Car	1	2	3	4	5	6	7	8	9	10	11	DC	Points
1987	(Australia) JPS Team BMW	BMW M3	MNZ	JAR	DIJ	NUR	SPA	BNO	SIL	BAT ovr:6 cls:2	CLD	WEL	FUJ	NC	0

† Not eligible for series points

=== Complete Bathurst 1000 results ===
Year	Team	Co-drivers	Car	Class	Laps	Pos.	Class pos.
1985	(New Zealand) Mark Petch Motorsport	(Australia) John Bowe	Volvo 240T	B	122	DNF	DNF
1986	(New Zealand) Motorsport Pacific Ltd.	(New Zealand) Leo Leonard	Ford Sierra XR4Ti	C	27	DNF	DNF
1987	(Australia) JPS Team BMW	(West Germany) Ludwig Finauer	BMW M3	2	156	6th	2nd
1988	(New Zealand) Mark Petch Motorsport / Wolf Racing Australasia	(West Germany) Armin Hahne	Ford Sierra RS500	A	103	DNF	DNF
1989	(New Zealand) Mark Petch Motorsport	(Italy) Gianfranco Brancatelli	Ford Sierra RS500	A	14	DNF	DNF
1990	(New Zealand) Gullivers Travels Inc.	(New Zealand) Andrew Bagnall	Ford Sierra RS500	A	155	7th	7th

Sporting positions
Preceded by Jim Richards	Winner of the Australian Touring Car Championship; 1986	Succeeded by Jim Richards
