= Mark Petch Motorsport =

- Manufacturer: Volvo; Ford; BMW; Holden
- Team Principal: Mark Petch
- Race Drivers: Robbie Francevic; Michel Delcourt; John Bowe; Thomas Lindström; Leo Leonard; Armin Hahne; G Brancatelli; Robb Gravett; Brett Riley; Kayne Scott; Greg Murphy; Ashley Stitchbury
- Chassis: Volvo 240T; Ford XR4Ti; BMW M3; Ford Sierra RS500; Ford Falcon AU; Holden Commodore VZ; Ford Falcon BA
- Debut: 1985
- Drivers' Championships: 3

Mark Petch Motorsport was a motor racing team that competed in Australian and New Zealand motorsport.

== History ==
Mark Petch Motorsport was formed in 1985 by former New Zealand National Championship winner Mark Petch. A Volvo 240T was imported from Belgium and debuted at the 1985 Wellington 500 where Robbie Francevic and Michel Delcourt won. Francevic then drove the car in the 1985 Australian Touring Car Championship, recording wins at Symmons Plains and Oran Park before teaming with John Bowe at the Sandown 500 and Bathurst 1000.

Francevic drove the 240T to victories in the opening two rounds of the 1986 Australian Touring Car Championship, after which the team's Australian assets then sold to the Volvo Dealer Team. Mark Petch Motorsport purchased an ex-Andy Rouse Engineering Ford XR4Ti, with Francevic driving the car at the 1986 Bathurst 1000.

In 1987, Mark Petch Motorsport purchased the CiBiEmme BMW M3 that had been raced by Johnny Cecotto and Gianfranco Brancatelli at the 1987 Bathurst 1000. In 1988, Mark Petch purchased a Wolf Racing Ford Sierra RS500 with Armin Hahne co-driving at the Bathurst 1000 and Wellington 500.

In 1989, Francevic competed in two rounds of the Australian Touring Car Championship before being joined by Gianfranco Brancatelli at Bathurst and Wellington. In 1990, the car was raced at Bathurst by Brancatelli and Robb Gravett.

In 1991, the Sierra was raced at Wellington by Brett Riley and Kayne Scott and in 1992 by Scott and Greg Murphy. A second Sierra was purchased from Dick Johnson Racing at the end of 1991.

Mark Petch Motorsport later became involved in New Zealand TraNZam racing and the New Zealand V8 Series winning the latter three times before being disbanded at the end of 2009.
