= Toyota Team Australia =

Two former motor racing teams

- Manufacturer: Toyota
- Team Manager: Tony Niovanni
- Race Drivers: John Smith (1985-90); Drew Price (1985-89); John Faulkner (1985-90); Ray Cutchie (1985); Mike Quinn (1986-87); Mike Freeman (1988); Peter McKay (1988-90); Mike Oliver (1988); Brett Riley (1988); Neal Bates (1989-90); Mike Dowson (1989-90); Mark Poole (1990); Paul Stokell (1990)
- Chassis: Sprinter; Corolla E80; Corolla E90; Supra
- Debut: 1985
- Drivers' Championships: 5 (1985, 1986, 1988, 1989, 1990)

Toyota Team Australia was the name of two allied Australian motor racing teams. One competed in the Australian Touring Car Championship between 1985 and 1990. The other was a rally team in the Australian Rally Championship that competed from 1988 and continues today the identity of Neal Bates Motorsport as a historic rally team.

== History ==
Toyota Team Australia was founded in 1985 as the factory team of Toyota. The team competed in the under two litre category of the Australian Touring Car Championship with Sprinters and Corollas winning the category in most years.

In 1989 the team commenced competing in the outright class with a Supra, however because of the weight regulations of the time the car was not competitive. Also, and unfortunately for TTA and its lead driver John Smith who was given the job of developing the Supra, Toyota really wasn't interested in touring car racing other than its Corolla's (being their bread and butter showroom sellers) usually winning the baby car class and the budget to develop the Supra just wasn't enough to make it competitive in Group A racing. Most of the Toyota Racing Development (TRD) budget went to their Group C sports cars and their World Rally Championship (WRC) efforts.

Toyota Team Australia closed at the end of 1990, although much of the team's personnel and equipment were reassembled by lead driver John Smith for the 1991 and 1992 Bathurst 1000s with the turbo Supra.
