= 1989 Tooheys 1000 =

Motor race in Australia

Seasons
- ← 1988 1990 →

Layout of the Mount Panorama Circuit

The 1989 Tooheys 1000 was the 30th running of the Bathurst 1000 touring car race. It was held on 1 October 1989 at the Mount Panorama Circuit just outside Bathurst, Australia. The race was held for cars eligible under International Group A touring car regulations with three engine capacity classes.

The race was won by the Dick Johnson Racing Ford Sierra of Dick Johnson and John Bowe. The pair lead almost the whole of the race and was only seriously threatened by the Allan Moffat run Sierra of German drivers Klaus Niedzwiedz and Frank Biela. Third and fourth places were awarded to the official factory Nissan team entries with the Nissan Skyline of Jim Richards and Mark Skaife finishing third.

The Tooheys Top Ten runoff for pole position was notable for Peter Brock discharging his Ford Sierra's engine bay Halon gas fire extinguisher which was angled across the intercooler substantially boosting the power of the engine in the crucial drive up the mountain straight. As this was not technically against the rules the scrutineers did not find any misconduct, but the Entrants Association levied a $5000 fine on Brock for a moral infringement of the rules.

== Class structure ==
Cars competed in three classes defined by engine capacity.

=== Class 1 ===
Class 1 (Over 2501cc) The Class featured;
1 BMW 635CSis,
17 Ford Sierra RS500's,
18 Holden VL Commodore SS Group A SV's,
2 Mitsubishi Starion Turbo's,
1 Nissan Skyline DR30 RS,
2 Nissan Skyline HR31 GTS-R's,
1 Toyota Supra Turbo,
1 Toyota Supra Turbo A.

=== Class 2 ===
Class 2 (1601 to 2500cc) The Class featured;
4 BMW M3s,
1 Nissan Gazelle.

=== Class 3 ===
Class 3 (Up to 1600cc) The Class featured;
2 Toyota Corolla FX-GT's,
4 Toyota Corolla's.

== Tooheys Top Ten ==
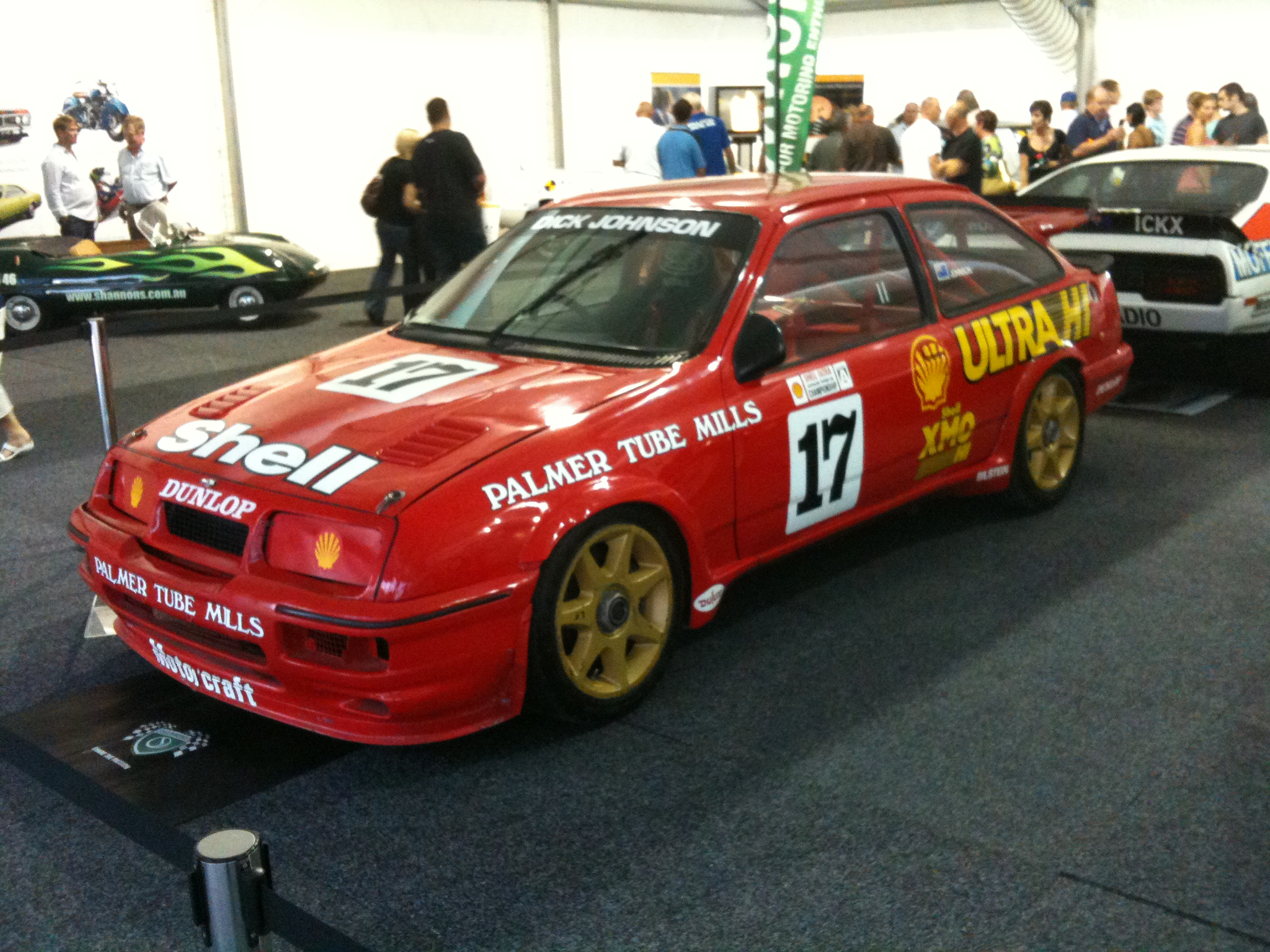
The race winning Ford Sierra RS500 (pictured in 2010)

The Tooheys Top Ten was contested on the Saturday by the fastest ten cars from Friday to determine the final positions for the first five rows on the grid. For the first time since the advent of the Top Ten in 1978, television broadcaster Channel 7 aired the runoff in a one-hour package on the Saturday afternoon rather than the half-hour package of previous years. The extra time meant that each lap was shown in full for the first time rather than just sections of the laps run.

Pos	No	Entrant	Driver	Car	TT10	Qual
Pole	05	Mobil 1 Racing	(Australia) Peter Brock	Ford Sierra RS500	2:15.80	2:16.60
2	17	Shell Ultra Hi Racing	(Australia) Dick Johnson	Ford Sierra RS500	2:16.79	2:16.58
3	25	Benson & Hedges Racing	(Australia) Tony Longhurst	Ford Sierra RS500	2:16.98	2:16.98
4	10	Allan Moffat Racing	(West Germany) Klaus Niedzwiedz	Ford Sierra RS500	2:17.42	2:17.02
5	105	Mobil 1 Racing	(Australia) Brad Jones	Ford Sierra RS500	2:19.09	2:18.20
6	6	Miedecke Motorsport	(Australia) Andrew Miedecke	Ford Sierra RS500	2:19.88	2:18.14
7	2	Nissan Motorsport Australia	(New Zealand) Jim Richards	Nissan Skyline HR31 GTS-R	2:20.09	2:18.86
8	30	Peter Jackson Racing	(Australia) Glenn Seton	Ford Sierra RS500	2:20.52	2:19.06
9	20	Benson & Hedges Racing	(Australia) Alan Jones	Ford Sierra RS500	2:20.63	2:19.06
10	8	Miedecke Motorsport	(New Zealand) Andrew Bagnall	Ford Sierra RS500	DNF	2:19.10

* Peter Brock's only ever pole position at Bathurst where he didn't drive a V8 powered Holden. It was his first Bathurst pole since 1983 (and the last he would set himself), and his first front row start since 1984. It was also his record 6th Bathurst pole having been fastest qualifier in 1974, 1977, 1978 and 1979 and 1983.
* Andrew Bagnall crashed his Ford Sierra RS500 on top of The Mountain during the runoff and was allowed to start from 10th position, much like Dick Johnson who crashed his Ford XE Falcon in the runoff in 1983. Unlike Johnson in 1983 however, Bagnall's car was able to be repaired and did not need to be replaced.
* 1989 was the first time that a V8 Holden had not qualified for the Top Ten runoff. The fastest Holden was the #16 Holden Racing Team VL Commodore SS Group A SV of Larry Perkins and defending race winner Tomas Mezera in 11th with a 2:19.11 set by Perkins, missing out by only 0.01 seconds to Bagnall's Sierra.
* 1989 saw the only time between 1979 and 2003 that a car in which Larry Perkins was listed as a driver did not feature in the runoff (from 1982 until 1984, Perkins cars started on each front row, but it was his HDT team mate/boss Peter Brock who set each runoff time).
* 1989 saw the first and so far only time where every car in the Top Ten runoff was powered by a turbocharged engine, with nine Sierra RS500's and the lone factory Nissan Skyline of Jim Richards making up the 10 runners.

== Official results ==
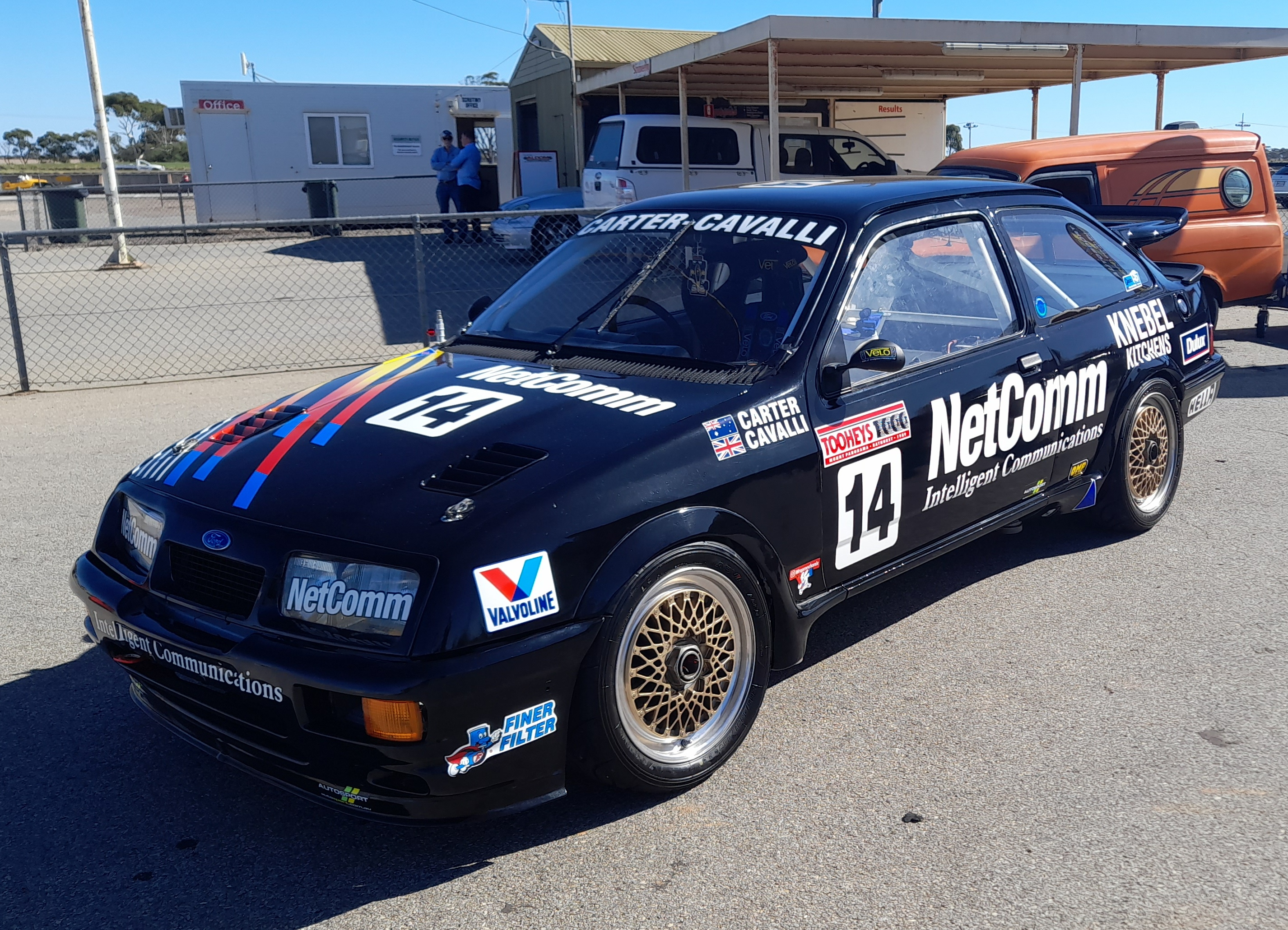
The Ford Sierra RS500 that was driven by Murray Carter and John Mann. The car is pictured in 2023.

Pos	Class	No	Entrant	Drivers	Car	Laps	Qual Pos	Shootout Pos
1	1	17	Shell Ultra Hi Racing	(Australia) Dick Johnson (Australia) John Bowe	Ford Sierra RS500	161	1	2
2	1	10	Allan Moffat Racing	(West Germany) Klaus Niedzwiedz (West Germany) Frank Biela	Ford Sierra RS500	161	4	4
3	1	2	Nissan Motorsport Australia	(New Zealand) Jim Richards (Australia) Mark Skaife	Nissan Skyline HR31 GTS-R	160	7	7
4	1	3	Nissan Motorsport Australia	(Australia) George Fury (Sweden) Anders Olofsson	Nissan Skyline HR31 GTS-R	160	13	
5	1	20	Benson & Hedges Racing	(Australia) Alan Jones (New Zealand) Denny Hulme (Australia) Tony Longhurst	Ford Sierra RS500	158	8	9
6	1	16	Holden Racing Team	(Australia) Larry Perkins (Australia) Tomas Mezera	Holden VL Commodore SS Group A SV	158	11	
7	1	7	Holden Racing Team	(United Kingdom) Win Percy (Australia) Neil Crompton	Holden VL Commodore SS Group A SV	158	18	
8	1	18	Shell Ultra Hi Racing	(United Kingdom) Jeff Allam (United Kingdom) Robb Gravett	Ford Sierra RS500	158	12	
9	1	105	Mobil 1 Racing	(Australia) Brad Jones (New Zealand) Paul Radisich	Ford Sierra RS500	153	6	5
10	1	15	ICL Racing	(Australia) Allan Grice (New Zealand) Peter Janson	Holden VL Commodore SS Group A SV	153	19	
11	1	37	Brian Callaghan	(Australia) Brian Callaghan (Australia) Barry Graham	Holden VL Commodore SS Group A SV	152	22	
12	1	55	Playscape Racing	(Australia) Kevin Waldock (Australia) Bryan Thomson	Ford Sierra RS500	152	23	
13	1	12	Lansvale Smash Repairs	(Australia) Steve Reed (Australia) Trevor Ashby	Holden VL Commodore SS Group A	151	29	
14	1	22	Lusty Engineering	(Australia) Graham Lusty (Australia) Alfredo Costanzo	Holden VL Commodore SS Group A SV	146	24	
15	1	34	Ray Gulson	(Australia) Ray Gulson (Australia) Graham Gulson	BMW 635 CSi	143	39	
16	2	52	M3 Motorsport	(Australia) Peter Doulman (Australia) John Cotter	BMW M3	142	42	
17	3	33	Toyota Team Australia	(Australia) Mike Dowson (Australia) Neal Bates	Toyota Corolla FX-GT	141	48	
18	1	44	Sutherland Mitsubishi	(Australia) Gary Scott (Australia) Kevin Bartlett (Australia) Terry Shiel	Mitsubishi Starion Turbo	141	26	
19	3	32	Toyota Team Australia	(New Zealand) John Faulkner (Australia) Peter McKay	Toyota Corolla FX-GT	140	46	
20	1	30	Peter Jackson Racing	(Australia) John Goss (Australia) Glenn Seton (Australia) Tony Noske	Ford Sierra RS500	140	9	8
21	1	60	Scotty Taylor	(Australia) Alan Taylor (Australia) Roger Hurd	Mitsubishi Starion Turbo	139	44	
22	1	54	Clive Smith	(Australia) Clive Smith (Australia) Paul Trevathan	Nissan Skyline DR30 RS	137	47	
23	3	78	Team Madison Racing	(Australia) Geoff Full (Australia) Michael Adcock	Toyota Corolla	136	53	
24	2	49	David Sala	(Australia) Ross Burbidge (Australia) Steve Williams	Nissan Gazelle	134	50	
25	1	38	Mulvihill Motorsport	(Australia) Tony Mulvihill (Australia) Graham Moore (New Zealand) Glenn McIntyre	Holden VL Commodore SS Group A SV	133	37	
26	1	4	Caltex CXT Racing Team	(Australia) Colin Bond (New Zealand) Bruce Stewart	Ford Sierra RS500	131	16	
27	1	48	Mistic Mould Destroyer	(Australia) Wayne Park (Australia) John Giddings	Holden VL Commodore SS Group A SV	130	27	
NC	1	28	Joseph Sommariva	(Australia) Joseph Sommariva (Australia) Warren McKellar	BMW 635 CSi	118	45	
DNF	1	45	Lester Smerdon	(Australia) Lester Smerdon (Australia) Gary Hinton (Australia) Marty Turpin	Holden VL Commodore SS Group A SV	112	43	
NC	3	13	Bob Holden Motors	(Australia) Bob Holden (New Zealand) Joe McAndrew (Australia) Tim Hall	Toyota Corolla	108	54	
NC	1	69	Garry Willmington Performance	(Australia) Ray Lintott (Egypt) Reda Awadullah	Holden VL Commodore SS Group A SV	106	51	
DNF	3	51	Bob Holden Motors	(Australia) Dennis Rogers (Australia) Marc Ducquet (Australia) Richard Vorst	Toyota Corolla	103	56	
DNF	2	50	Bryce Racing	(New Zealand) Brett Riley (West Germany) Ludwig Finauer	BMW M3	101	28	
DNF	2	57	Sax Racing	(New Zealand) Craig Turner (New Zealand) Kent Baigent (New Zealand) Lou Vandermeer	BMW M3	98	41	
DNF	1	8	Miedecke Motorsport	(New Zealand) Andrew Bagnall (New Zealand) Graeme Crosby	Ford Sierra RS500	97	10	10
DNF	1	35	Peter Jackson Racing	(Australia) Tony Noske (Australia) Glenn Seton (France) Alain Ferté	Ford Sierra RS500	92	17	
DNF	1	24	Jagparts	(Australia) Gerald Kay (Australia) Alf Grant	Holden VL Commodore SS Group A SV	91	38	
NC	1	68	Garry Willmington Performance	(Australia) Garry Willmington (Australia) Tom Watkinson	Toyota Supra Turbo	91	49	
NC	1	23	Chris Lambden	(United Kingdom) Chris Lambden (Australia) Greg Crick	Holden VL Commodore SS Group A SV	90	25	
DNF	2	56	Sax Racing	(New Zealand) Graham Lorimer (New Zealand) John Sax	BMW M3	82	36	
DNF	1	05	Mobil 1 Racing	(Australia) Peter Brock (United Kingdom) Andy Rouse	Ford Sierra RS500	81	2	1
DNF	1	41	Leeson Civil Engineering	(Australia) Bob Tindal (Australia) Des Wall (Australia) John Leeson	Holden VL Commodore SS Group A SV	79	55	
DNF	1	43	Everlast Battery Service	(Australia) Bill O'Brien (Australia) Brian Sampson	Holden VL Commodore SS Group A SV	65	33	
DNF	1	19	Caltex CXT Racing Team	(Australia) Ken Mathews (Australia) Garry Rogers	Ford Sierra RS500	50	20	
DNF	1	21	Bob Forbes Racing	(Australia) Mark Gibbs (Australia) Rohan Onslow	Holden VL Commodore SS Group A SV	44	21	
DNF	1	46	Reithmuller Pentecost Racing	(West Germany) Llyndon Reithmuller (Australia) Ian Green	Holden VL Commodore SS Group A SV	43	34	
DNF	1	31	Toyota Team Australia	(Australia) John Smith (Australia) Drew Price	Toyota Supra Turbo A	35	35	
DNF	1	9	Allan Moffat Racing	(Australia) Gregg Hansford (Belgium) Pierre Dieudonné	Ford Sierra RS500	30	14	
DNF	1	96	Barbagallo Motorsport	(New Zealand) Tim Slako (Australia) Damon Smith (Australia) Geoff Leeds	Holden VL Commodore SS Group A SV	28	30	
DNF	1	25	Benson & Hedges Racing	(Australia) Tony Longhurst (New Zealand) Neville Crichton	Ford Sierra RS500	27	3	3
DNF	1	27	Mark Petch Motorsport	(New Zealand) Robbie Francevic (Italy) Gianfranco Brancatelli	Ford Sierra RS500	14	15	
DNF	1	40	Terry Finnigan	(Australia) Terry Finnigan (Australia) Geoff Leeds	Holden VL Commodore SS Group A SV	14	31	
DNF	1	14	Murray Carter	(Australia) Murray Carter (Australia) John Mann	Ford Sierra RS500	10	32	
DNF	1	42	Matt Wacker	(Australia) Matt Wacker (Australia) Frank Porter (Australia) Mike King	Holden VL Commodore SS Group A SV	4	40	
DNF	1	6	Miedecke Motorsport	(Australia) Andrew Miedecke (Australia) Charlie O'Brien	Ford Sierra RS500	0	5	6
DNS	3	39	David Sala	(Australia) David Sala (Australia) Richard Vorst	Toyota Corolla			

== Statistics ==
- Provisional Pole Position – #17 Dick Johnson – 2:16.58
- Pole Position – #05 Peter Brock – 2:15.80
- Fastest Lap – #17 Dick Johnson – 2:19.12 – Lap 2
- Average Speed – 154 km/h
- Race time of winning car – 6:30:53.44

== See also ==
1989 Australian Touring Car season
