= 1989 Australian Touring Car Championship =

Motor racing competition

Seasons
- ← 1988 1990 →

The 1989 Australian Touring Car Championship was an Australian motor racing competition open to Group 3A Touring Cars. It was sanctioned by the Confederation of Australian Motor Sport as the 30th Australian Touring Car Championship. The championship began on 5 March at Amaroo Park and ended on 9 July at Oran Park Raceway after eight rounds. The 1989 Australian Manufacturers' Championship was contested over the same eight round series.

The championship, which was promoted as the Shell Ultra Australian Touring Car Championship, was won by Dick Johnson driving a Ford Sierra RS500. Toyota won the Australian Manufacturers' Championship.

== Teams and drivers ==
The following drivers and teams competed in the 1989 Australian Touring Car Championship.

Team	Car	No	Driver	Rounds
Nissan Motorsport Australia	Nissan Skyline HR31 GTS-R	2	(New Zealand) Jim Richards	All
Nissan Motorsport Australia	Nissan Skyline HR31 GTS-R	3	(Australia) George Fury	1-5, 7-8
Nissan Motorsport Australia	Nissan Skyline HR31 GTS-R	12	(Australia) Mark Skaife	5-8
Caltex CXT Racing	Ford Sierra RS500	4	(Australia) Colin Bond	All
Caltex CXT Racing	Ford Sierra RS500	19	(Australia) Ken Mathews	1, 3, 8
Mobil 1 Racing	Ford Sierra RS500	05	(Australia) Peter Brock	All
Mobil 1 Racing	Ford Sierra RS500	105	(Australia) Brad Jones	1-7
Miedecke Motorsport	Ford Sierra RS500	6	(Australia) Andrew Miedecke	1-2, 6-8
Miedecke Motorsport	Ford Sierra RS500	8	(New Zealand) Andrew Bagnall	1-3, 6
Allan Moffat Enterprises	Ford Sierra RS500	9	(Canada) Allan Moffat	1-2, 4-8
Allan Moffat Enterprises	Ford Sierra RS500	9	(Australia) Gregg Hansford	3
Dennis Norgard	Holden VL Commodore SS Group A SV	10	(Australia) Dennis Norgard	4
Perkins Engineering	Holden VL Commodore SS Group A SV	11	(Australia) Larry Perkins	6-7
Bob Holden Motors	Toyota Sprinter AE86	13	(Australia) Tim Hall	1
Bob Holden Motors	Toyota Sprinter AE86	13	(Australia) Bob Holden	3, 5-7
Bob Holden Motors	Toyota Corolla	51	(Australia) Dennis Rogers	1, 6-8
Murray Carter	Ford Sierra RS500	14	(Australia) Murray Carter	1, 3, 8
ICL Racing	Holden VL Commodore SS Group A SV	15	(Australia) Allan Grice	7
Shell Ultra-Hi Racing	Ford Sierra RS500	17	(Australia) Dick Johnson	All
Shell Ultra-Hi Racing	Ford Sierra RS500	18	(Australia) John Bowe	All
Benson & Hedges Racing	Ford Sierra RS500	20	(New Zealand) Neville Crichton	All
Benson & Hedges Racing	Ford Sierra RS500	25	(Australia) Tony Longhurst	All
Lusty Engineering	Holden VL Commodore SS Group A SV	22	(Australia) Graham Lusty	2-3, 6-7
Chris Lambden	Holden VL Commodore SS Group A SV	23	(New Zealand) Chris Lambden	All
Gerald Kay	Holden VK Commodore SS Group A	24	(Australia) Gerald Kay	All
Tony Noske	Holden VL Commodore SS Group A SV	26	(Australia) Tony Noske	6
Mark Petch Motorsport	Ford Sierra RS500	27	(New Zealand) Robbie Francevic	6-8
Joe Sommariva	BMW 635 CSi	28	(Australia) Joe Sommariva	1-3, 5-8
Lawrie Nelson	Ford Mustang	29	(Australia) Lawrie Nelson	7-8
Peter Jackson Racing	Ford Sierra RS500	30	(Australia) Glenn Seton	1-3, 6-8
Toyota Team Australia	Toyota Corolla	31	(Australia) David Armstrong	6
Toyota Team Australia	Toyota Corolla	31	(Australia) John Smith	8
Toyota Team Australia	Toyota Corolla	32	(New Zealand) John Faulkner	All
Toyota Team Australia	Toyota Corolla	33	(Australia) Russell Becker	1
Toyota Team Australia	Toyota Corolla	33	(Australia) Terri Sawyer	2
Toyota Team Australia	Toyota Corolla	33	(Australia) Mike Dowson	3
Toyota Team Australia	Toyota Corolla	33	(Australia) Anthony Fogliani	4
Toyota Team Australia	Toyota Corolla	33	(Australia) Darryl Bennett	5-6
Toyota Team Australia	Toyota Corolla	33	(Australia) Neal Bates	7
Toyota Team Australia	Toyota Corolla	33	(Australia) Brooke Tatnell	8
Lansvale Racing Team	Holden VL Commodore SS Group A	35	(Australia) Steve Reed	8
Bob Forbes Racing	Holden VL Commodore SS Group A SV	36	(Australia) Mark Gibbs	1, 8
Brian Callaghan	Holden VL Commodore SS Group A SV	37	(Australia) Brian Callaghan	1, 8
Tony Mulvihill	Holden VL Commodore SS Group A SV	38	(Australia) Tony Mulvihill	
David Sala	Nissan Gazelle	39	(Australia) David Sala	All
David Sala	Nissan Gazelle	39	(Australia) Ross Burbidge	
David Sala	Nissan Gazelle	39	(Australia) Grant Bailey	
Terry Finnigan	Holden VL Commodore SS Group A SV	40	(Australia) Terry Finnigan	3
Terry Finnigan	Holden VL Commodore SS Group A SV	40	(Australia) Geoff Leeds	
G. Herbert	Rover SD1 Vitesse	40	(Australia) Peter Harper	4
ICL Racing	Holden VL Commodore SS Group A SV	41	(Australia) Garry Rogers	1, 6-7
Matt Wacker	Holden VL Commodore SS Group A SV	42	(Germany) Matt Wacker	1-2, 6-7
Ian Love	Holden VL Commodore SS Group A SV	44	(Australia) Ian Love	4
Llynden Reithmuller	Holden VL Commodore SS Group A SV	46	(West Germany) Llynden Reithmuller	6-8
Wayne Park	Holden VL Commodore SS Group A	48	(Australia) Wayne Park	1, 3, 8
M3 Motorsport	BMW M3	52	(Australia) John Cotter	8
Clive Smith	Nissan Skyline DR30 RS	54	(Australia) Clive Smith	6-8
Playscape Racing	Ford Sierra RS500	55	(Australia) Kevin Waldock	8
Scotty Taylor Racing	Mitsubishi Starion	60	(Australia) Roger Hurd	8
Garry Willmington Performance	Holden VL Commodore SS Group A SV	68	(Australia) Garry Willmington	1, 3, 7-8
Garry Willmington Performance	Holden VL Commodore SS Group A SV	69	(Egypt) Reda Awadullah	1, 3
Barbagallo Motorsport	Holden VL Commodore SS Group A SV	77	(Australia) Alf Barbagallo	4-5
Barbagallo Motorsport	Holden VL Commodore SS Group A SV	96	(New Zealand) Tim Slako	4-6
Team Madison Racing	Toyota Sprinter AE86	78	(Australia) Geoff Full	1, 3-5
Team Madison Racing	Toyota Sprinter AE86	78	(Australia) Michael Adcock	7-8
Daryl Hendrick	Holden VL Commodore SS Group A SV	86	(Australia) Daryl Hendrick	6-7
Rick Scarf	Holden VK Commodore SS Group A	99	(Australia) Rick Scarf	8

== Season review ==
Following on from their dominant 1988 championship 1-2, the Dick Johnson Racing Ford Sierra RS500 drivers Dick Johnson and John Bowe again finished 1-2 in the title race, winning the first six rounds with Johnson's fifth (and last) championship win equaling the record of Ian Geoghegan. Like Geoghegan, all of Dick Johnson's championships were won driving Fords.

The championship also saw long time Holden driver Peter Brock turn to Fords (after a year with BMW) in a bid to return to the top in Australia with two cars secured from British Sierra expert Andy Rouse for himself and Albury based driver Brad Jones. Brock's pole in Round 2 at Symmons Plains was his first touring car pole since the 1986 Sandown 500, while his win in the final round at Oran Park was his first ATCC win since 1986 and his first ever ATCC win in anything other than a Holden. Brock in his Mobil 1 Racing Sierra would prove to be the Shell team's most consistent challenger, finishing third in the championship, his highest placing since he finished third in 1985. Most observers felt that Brock adapted to the powerful Sierra's quicker than most, though he readily admitted his link with Rouse and the technical help he gave was a big factor in the Mobil teams revival. Also, unlike most of his fellow competitors when they started racing the Sierra's, Brock wasn't a stranger to racing turbocharged cars having raced a Porsche 956B at Silverstone and Le Mans in the 1984 World Sportscar Championship.

Other driver/team changes in 1989 included a new Ford Sierra team for former Nissan driver Glenn Seton who took Nissan's Peter Jackson cigarette sponsorship with him to his new team. Also switching from Nissan was his father Barry Seton who became the chief engine builder for his sons new team. 1988 Tooheys 1000 winner Tony Longhurst expanded his Benson & Hedges Racing to a two car team with a second Sierra for former JPS Team BMW teammate Neville Crichton. The two B&H cars had been acquired from the Wolf Racing Australasia team formerly run by Robbie Francevic and his long-time patron Mark Petch. Colin Bond also expanded his Caltex-backed Sierra team to two cars, running a second for Sydney car dealer Ken Mathews who had purchased the Bathurst winning Sierra from Longhurst. For the first time in Australian Group A, BMW wasn't represented by one of the top teams which prompted BMW Australia to pull out. The M3 was reduced to a class runner and it was left to privateers John Cotter and his regular co-driver Peter Doulman running one of the ex-JPS/Mobil M3's purchased from Brock at the end of 1988 to keep a BMW presence on the grid.

1989 also saw the last ATCC round win for long time factory Nissan driver George Fury when he took victory in Round 7 at the tight Winton circuit in rural Victoria in what proved to be the most competitive race of the championship. In fact, when Peter Brock led at the end of lap one at Winton it was actually the first time since Round 6 in 1988 at Lakeside that someone other than Dick Johnson or John Bowe had led the first lap of an ATCC race (on that occasion it was the Sierra of Andrew Miedecke leading as Johnson had been pinged for a jump start, though Johnson led on the road). Fury, who had been with the team since its inaugural year in 1981, was joined in the Nissan team by 1985 and 1987 champion Jim Richards, and the teams 1987 Australian 2.0 Litre champion Mark Skaife, each driving a turbocharged Skyline HR31 GTS-R. The Skyline, which had been late arriving in 1988 and had run short of development, was more of a force in 1989 with the team finding greater power and reliability from the turbocharged 6 cyl 2.0L twin cam engine as well as getting the cars down to the Nissan's weight limit of 1100 kg, some 70 kg lighter than 1988. Skaife made his first appearance of the series at the Mallala circuit in South Australia for Round 5, and avoided the first corner carnage (caused by an out of control Brock) to finish a fine fifth.

The 1989 championship was the first since 1970 to be contested without an appearance by a factory supported Holden team. The Holden Special Vehicles team did not compete in the series, despite entering two Commodores for highly respected British driver Win Percy and Channel 7 commentator Neil Crompton in the opening round at Amaroo Park (a fact that Crompton's co-commentators Mike Raymond and Gary Wilkinson constantly reminded him about during the race telecasts). Allan Grice was the highest placed Holden driver in the championship, finishing in a hard-fought fourth position after a one-off appearance at Winton in a privately entered Roadways Racing Commodore he had driven in the 1988 Tooheys 1000. The Winton round, which started on a wet track and was damp throughout with a couple of additional showers, saw Grice ran the race on one set of wet tyres. The highest placed Holden driver from 1987 and 1988 championship, Larry Perkins, appeared in only two rounds (Sandown and Winton) with his privately entered Commodore, the same car he had driven at Bathurst the previous year as part of the factory backed Holden Special Vehicles/TWR team. 1989 was thus the first year in which no Holden driver had finished the championship inside the top ten positions since Herb Taylor placed twelfth in a Holden EH in 1968, the last year in which the ATCC was contested as a single race. Holden's lack of interest in the 1989 ATCC was not well received either by the fans or television broadcaster Channel 7. It was Holden's lack of representation from the factory backed team or the privateers that highlighted the growing costs of Group A racing, something which would cause a change in the sport after 1992.

Venue changes from the 1988 Championship were the deletion of the round at Calder Park and the addition of a round at the 2.601 km (1.616 mi) Mallala Motor Sport Park, located 55 km north of Adelaide. Mallala returned to the championship for the first time since 1971, replacing the round at the Bob Jane owned Adelaide International Raceway. Calder owner Bob Jane had signed an agreement with "Vic Health" which saw cigarette advertising banned at his race tracks (cigarette sponsorship was prominent in the ATCC with the Seton and Longhurst teams sponsored by Peter Jackson and Benson & Hedges respectively). As Jane also owned the Adelaide circuit, this saw AIR also dropped from the calendar.

Round 3 of the championship at Lakeside just north of Brisbane was full of drama. Initially scheduled to be run on 2 April, the meeting was postponed two weeks due to almost a weeks worth of heavy rain in the area which flooded the nearby Lake Kurwongbah that gives the circuit its name. The flooding saw both the front straight and pit area under about a foot of water. The race then took place on 16 April but was marred by a fiery crash on the back straight when Andrew Miedecke's Sierra collided with the VL Commodore of Graham Lusty while Lusty was being lapped. Both cars crashed heavily into the fence, as did the Sierra of the closely following Glenn Seton (Racecam from Brock's car caught the moment out of his rear window when the pair touched). Both the Commodore and Miedecke Sierra were engulfed in flames and wisely the race was red flagged. After a delay while the clean up was on, the race was reduced from 60 to 30 minutes with half points to be awarded for the round. Dick Johnson went on to win on his home circuit for the first time since his epic battle with Brock which won him his first ATCC back in 1981.

1989 would prove to be the last ATCC contested by four-time champion Allan Moffat with the Canadian born driver retiring from driving at the end of the year.

== Race calendar ==
The 1989 Australian Touring Car Championship was contested over eight rounds, with each round being a single race over a duration of approximately one hour.

Rd.	Circuit	Location / state	Date	Winning driver	Winning car	Winning team	Report
1	Amaroo Park	Sydney, New South Wales	5 March	(Australia) John Bowe	Ford Sierra RS500	Shell Ultra Hi Racing	
2	Symmons Plains Raceway	Launceston, Tasmania	12 March	(Australia) Dick Johnson	Ford Sierra RS500	Shell Ultra Hi Racing	
3	Lakeside International Raceway	Brisbane, Queensland	16 April	(Australia) Dick Johnson	Ford Sierra RS500	Shell Ultra Hi Racing	
4	Barbagallo Raceway	Perth, Western Australia	30 April	(Australia) John Bowe	Ford Sierra RS500	Shell Ultra Hi Racing	
5	Mallala Motor Sport Park	Mallala, South Australia	7 May	(Australia) Dick Johnson	Ford Sierra RS500	Shell Ultra Hi Racing	
6	Sandown Raceway	Melbourne, Victoria	21 May	(Australia) Dick Johnson	Ford Sierra RS500	Shell Ultra Hi Racing	
7	Winton Motor Raceway	Benalla, Victoria	4 June	(Australia) George Fury	Nissan Skyline HR31 GTS-R	Nissan Motorsport Australia	
8	Oran Park Raceway	Sydney, New South Wales	9 July	(Australia) Peter Brock	Ford Sierra RS500	Mobil 1 Racing	

== Points system ==
Points were awarded on a 20–15–12–10–8–6–4–3–2–1 basis for the top ten race positions. Only half points were awarded for Round 3 at Lakeside due to the stoppage of the initial race and the reduced 30-minute duration of the restarted race. The pointscore system allowed a driver to retain points only from his or her seven best round results. Discarded placings are shown within brackets in the table below.

== Championship results ==
Pos.	Driver	Car	Ama.	Sym.	Lak.	Wan.	Mal.	San.	Win.	Ora.	Points
1	Dick Johnson	Ford Sierra RS500	4th	1st	1st	3rd	1st	1st	(7th)	2nd	107 (111)
2	John Bowe	Ford Sierra RS500	1st	3rd	3rd	1st	3rd	3rd	(8th)	3rd	94 (97)
3	Peter Brock	Ford Sierra RS500	Ret	2nd	4th	4th	Ret	2nd	2nd	1st	80
4	Jim Richards	Nissan Skyline HR31 GTS-R	2nd	6th	6th	7th	2nd	4th	Ret	7th	57
5	Tony Longhurst	Ford Sierra RS500	6th	Ret	2nd	2nd	4th	5th	9th	5th	56.5
6	George Fury	Nissan Skyline HR31 GTS-R	3rd	10th	7th	9th	6th		1st	8th	46
7	Glenn Seton	Ford Sierra RS500	5th	4th	Ret			Ret	Ret	4th	28
8	Colin Bond	Ford Sierra RS500	11th	5th	9th	5th	Ret	6th	Ret	12th	23
9	Mark Skaife	Nissan Skyline HR31 GTS-R					5th	10th	3rd	10th	22
10	Brad Jones	Ford Sierra RS500	8th	Ret	Ret	6th	Ret	Ret	5th		17
11	Allan Moffat	Ford Sierra RS500	7th	Ret		Ret	DSQ	7th		6th	14
12	Neville Crichton	Ford Sierra RS500	12th	9th	8th	8th	7th	9th	DNS	Ret	12.5
13	Andrew Miedecke	Ford Sierra RS500	9th	8th	Ret			Ret	6th	Ret	11
14	Allan Grice	Holden VL Commodore SS Group A SV							4th		10
15	Gregg Hansford	Ford Sierra RS500			5th				11th		4
16	Andrew Bagnall	Ford Sierra RS500	Ret	7th	Ret			DNS			4
17	Chris Lambden	Holden VL Commodore SS Group A SV	22nd	11th	10th	Ret	8th	15th	Ret	Ret	3.5
18	Larry Perkins	Holden VL Commodore SS Group A SV						8th	Ret		3
19	Joe Sommariva	BMW 635 CSi	DNQ	15th	14th		9th	Ret	18th	19th	2
20	Robbie Francevic	Ford Sierra RS500	DNQ					DNS	15th	9th	2
21	John Faulkner	Toyota Corolla	17th	15th	13th	15th	10th	16th	12th	27th	1
21	Garry Willmington	Holden VL Commodore SS Group A SV	13th		15th				10th	18th	1
21	Tim Slako	Holden VL Commodore SS Group A SV				10th	Ret	14th			1
21	Mark Gibbs	Holden VL Commodore SS Group A SV	10th							Ret	1
Pos.	Driver	Car	Ama.	Sym.	Lak.	Wan.	Mal.	San.	Win.	Ora.	Points

Colour	Result
Gold	Winner
Silver	Second place
Bronze	Third place
Green	Points classification
Blue	Non-points classification
Blue	Non-classified finish (NC)
Purple	Retired, not classified (Ret)
Red	Did not qualify (DNQ)
Red	Did not pre-qualify (DNPQ)
Black	Disqualified (DSQ)
White	Did not start (DNS)
White	Withdrew (WD)
White	Race cancelled (C)
Blank	Did not practice (DNP)
Blank	Did not arrive (DNA)
Blank	Excluded (EX)

== Australian Manufacturers' Championship ==
The 1989 Australian Manufacturers' Championship, which was contested concurrently with the 1989 Australian Touring Car Championship, was won by Toyota.

== See also ==
1989 Australian Touring Car season
