= 1989 Pepsi 300 =

Australian motor race

Layout of the Oran Park Raceway

The 1989 Pepsi 300 was an endurance race for Group A touring cars. The event was held at the Oran Park Raceway in New South Wales, Australia on 19 August 1989 over 115 laps of the 2.620 km (1.628 mi) circuit, a total distance of 301 km (187 mi). This was the 11th and last touring car endurance race held at Oran Park with the 1990 event cancelled due to teams not entering due to a lack of television coverage.

The race was won by Andrew Miedecke and Andrew Bagnall driving a Miedecke Motorsport Ford Sierra RS500. Second was the BMW M3 of Brett Riley and Ludwig Finauer, while Murray Carter finished third in his Sierra.

1988 race co-winner Peter Brock qualified on pole in his Mobil 1 Racing Sierra, but was out of the race after only 13 laps with a suspected blown head gasket, though not before setting the fastest lap of the race. Formula Ford driver Mark Larkham was to be Brock's co-driver in the race.

== Results ==
Results were as follows:

Pos	Class	No	Team	Drivers	Car	Laps	Qual Pos	Qual Time
1	A	6	Miedecke Motorsport	(Australia) Andrew Miedecke (New Zealand) Andrew Bagnall	Ford Sierra RS500	115	3	1:12.20
2	B	54	Bryce Racing	(New Zealand) Brett Riley (West Germany) Ludwig Finauer	BMW M3	115	13	1:17.27
3	A	14	Murray Carter	(Australia) Murray Carter	Ford Sierra RS500	114	10	1:15.30
4	A	21	Bob Forbes Racing	(Australia) Mark Gibbs (Australia) Rohan Onslow	Holden VL Commodore SS Group A SV	114	9	1:15.51
5	A	22	Lusty Engineering	(Australia) Alfredo Costanzo (Australia) Graham Lusty	Holden VL Commodore SS Group A SV	114	11	1:16.28
6	A	34	Ray Gulson	(Australia) Graham Gulson	BMW 635 CSi	113	14	1:17.75
7	C	32	Toyota Team Australia	(New Zealand) John Faulkner (Australia) Peter McKay	Toyota Corolla	109	17	1:19.67
8	C	51	Bob Holden Motors	(Australia) Dennis Rogers (Australia) Mark Ducquet	Toyota Sprinter	107	21	1:24.04
9	C	78	Team Maddison	(Australia) Geoff Full (Australia) Michael Adcock	Toyota Corolla	101	19	1:22.71
10	A	36	Peter Hudson	(Australia) Ian Carrig (Australia) Ian Clark (Australia) Peter Hudson	BMW 635 CSi	100	18	1:22.06
11	A	4	Caltex CXT Race Team	(Australia) Colin Bond (Australia) Domenic Beninca	Ford Sierra RS500	99	4	1:12.99
12	A	42	Matt Wacker	(Australia) Matt Wacker (Australia) Mike King	Holden VL Commodore SS Group A SV	91	15	1:19.27
13	A	24	The Xerox Shop	(Australia) Scotty Taylor (Australia) Roger Hurd	Mitsubishi Starion	78	16	1:19.02
DNF	A	52	M3 Motorsport	(Australia) John Cotter (Australia) Peter Doulman	BMW M3	108	12	1:18.05
DNF	A	44	Sutherland Mitsubishi	(Australia) Gary Scott (Australia) Kevin Bartlett	Mitsubishi Starion	107	5	1:14.32
DNF	A	19	Caltex CXT Race Team	(Australia) Ken Mathews (Australia) Bruce Stewart	Ford Sierra RS500	67	6	1:14.38
DNF	A	37	Brian Callaghan	(Australia) Brian Callaghan (Australia) Barry Graham	Holden VL Commodore SS Group A SV	25	7	1:14.99
DNF	A	05	Mobil 1 Racing	(Australia) Peter Brock (Australia) Mark Larkham	Ford Sierra RS500	13	1	1:11.32
DNF	C	13	Bob Holden Motors	(Australia) Bob Holden (Australia) Dennis Rogers	Ford Sierra RS500	10	20	1:22.72
DNF	A	55	Playscape Racing	(Australia) Kevin Waldock (Australia) Bryan Thomson	Ford Sierra RS500	9	8	1:15.27
DNF	A	40	Terry Finnigan	(Australia) Terry Finnigan (Australia) John English	Holden VL Commodore SS Group A SV	10	22	1:25.02
DSQ	A	25	Benson & Hedges Racing	(Australia) Tony Longhurst (New Zealand) Neville Crichton	Ford Sierra RS500	10	2	1:12.03

== Statistics ==
- Pole Position - 1:11.32 - #05 Peter Brock
- Fastest Lap - 1:13.08 - #05 Peter Brock

== See also ==
1989 Australian Touring Car season
