= Miedecke Motorsport =

Australian motor racing team

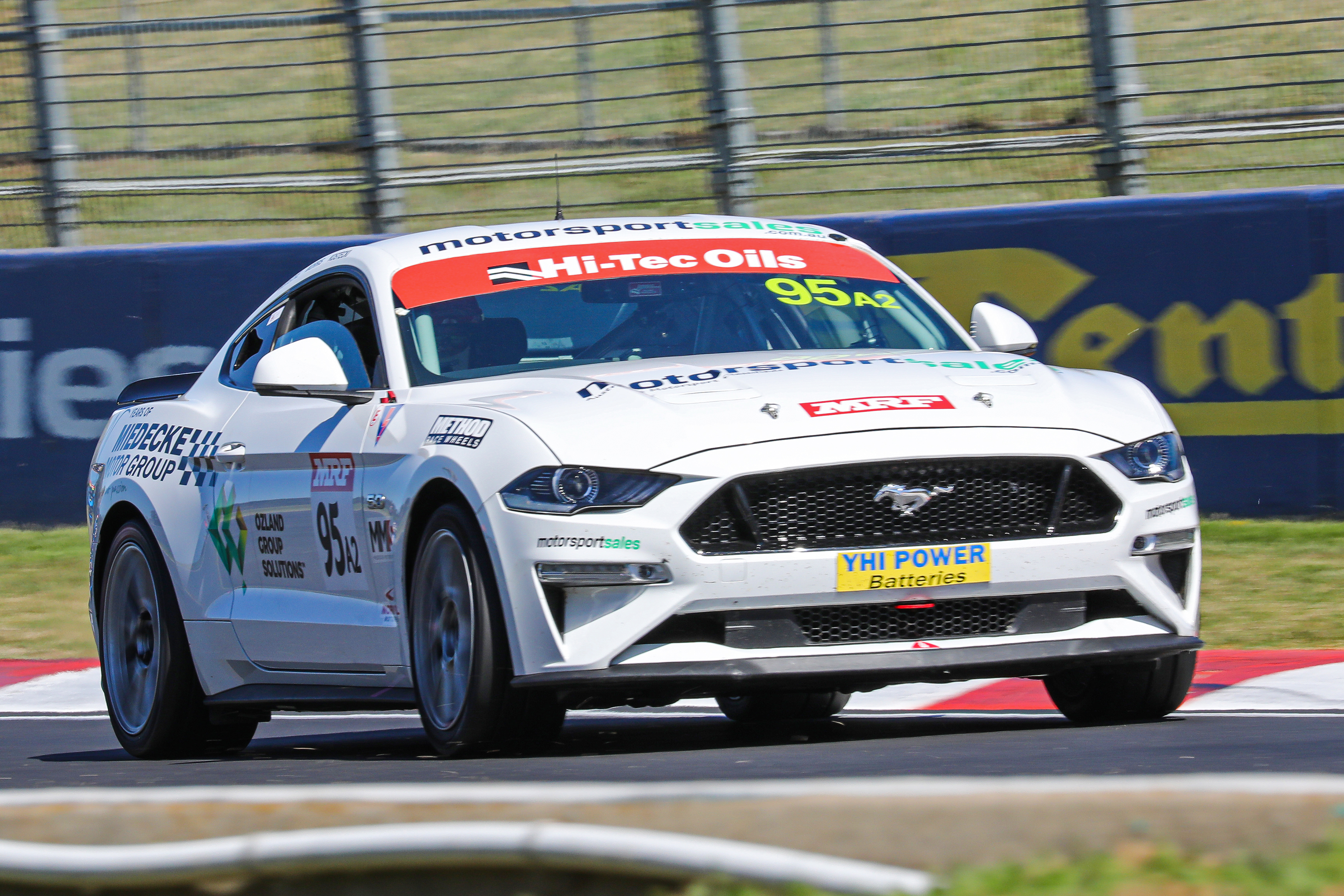
- Manufacturer: Ford
- Team Principal: Andrew Miedecke
- Team Manager: Ross Stone
- Race Drivers: Andrew Miedecke (1987–89); Don Smith (1987); John Giddings (1987); Bruce Stewart (1987); Andrew Bagnall (1988–89); Steve Soper (1988); Pierre Dieudonné (1988); Charlie O'Brien (1989); Graeme Crosby (1989)
- Chassis: Sierra RS Cosworth; Sierra RS500
- Debut: 1987
- 1989 position: 13th (Miedecke); 16th (Bagnall)

Miedecke Motorsport is an Australian motor racing team from Port Macquarie that is competing in GT4 Australia. It has previously competed in touring car racing between 1987 and 1989, and an earlier form of the team also competed in open wheel racing between 1981 and 1983.

== History ==
=== Open Wheel Racing ===
Prior to the formation of the Group A Touring car racing team in 1987, Andrew Miedecke had run his own team in open wheel racing. He finished fourth in the 1976 Australian Formula 2 Championship driving a Rennmax BN7 with sponsorship from Sydney based department store chain Grace Bros. He later campaigned a Ralt RT4-Ford in the 1982 and 1983 Australian Drivers' Championships with backing from the Port Macquarie Tourist Bureau. He placed 3rd in 1982, winning Round 2 of the series at the Adelaide International Raceway, and would finish 3rd again in 1983, again winning Round 2 of the series at Lakeside in Brisbane. Miedecke had not actually planned to race the Ralt during 1983 but changed his mind after watching Round 1 of the series (Adelaide) on television and found himself wishing he was out there.

Miedecke had actually begun competing in the Ralt at the 1981 Australian Grand Prix at Calder Park in Melbourne where he qualified in 11th place before a steady run saw him finish 5th just one lap down on winner Roberto Moreno of Brazil. Miedecke also finished on the same lap as 1981 Formula One World Champion Nelson Piquet who finished 2nd. He again qualified 11th for the 1982 Australian Grand Prix at Calder and went on to finish 6th, one lap down on Frenchman Alain Prost. At the 1983 Australian Grand Prix at Calder, Miedecke again qualified the Ralt in 11th place, though he failed to finish the race after the rotor button in the distributor failed on lap 64.

Racing his Ralt Ford, Andrew Miedecke won the 1981 and 1982 Malaysian Grand Prix at the Shah Alam Circuit.

=== Touring Cars ===
Andrew Miedecke's first start in touring cars came at the 1986 James Hardie 1000 when he was to drive a Mercedes-Benz 190E imported from West Germany as part of Bob Jane's team. Partnered with German driver Jörg van Ommen, they qualified the Class B car in 35th place but were out of the race after van Ommen was pushed into the outside fence at Murray's Corner at the end of the first lap. It was the first retirement of the race.

Miedecke Motorsport was formed in 1987 by Don Smith as Oxo Supercube Motorsport to compete in the 1987 Australian Touring Car Championship with a pair of Ford Sierra RS Cosworths sourced from English Sierra expert Andy Rouse. With sponsorship from Oxo. Andrew Miedecke signed on to drive the second car. Mid-season, Smith sold his car to John Giddings who took over driving it at round six.

After a frustrating ATCC in which Miedecke was often among the leaders in the Sierra, the team upgraded to the newly homologated Ford Sierra RS500 for the endurance races including the Castrol 500 at Sandown in Melbourne and, the James Hardie 1000 at Bathurst and the Bob Jane T-Marts 500 at Melbourne's Calder Park Raceway, the latter two races being rounds of the inaugural World Touring Car Championship.

The Castrol 500 was something of a disaster for the team. After Miedecke had set the fastest time in qualifying to grab provisional pole position (before the "Dulux Dozen" top 12 runoff for pole), Don Smith rolled the Sierra at the end of the main straight, putting the car out for the weekend. The team's second car driven by veterans John Giddings and Bruce Stewart failed to finish after their Sierra suffered differential failure on lap 82.

The team had a new car ready for the Bathurst 1000 and Miedecke was the fastest Australian Sierra after Hardies Heroes in 5th place (though he would start 4th after the third Eggenberger Motorsport was withdrawn). Miedecke was then among the early pace setters along with Andy Rouse driving Allan Moffat's leased Sierra, and the Ford Europe backed Eggenberger Motorsport Sierra of Steve Soper. The trio continually swapping the lead over the first 30 laps of the race. While the European Sierra's had the edge in straight line speed, the Oxo car, thanks to Miedecke's open wheel experience, handled better and was quicker across the top of the mountain. Despite his power disadvantage Miedecke was able to stay with Soper and Rouse on the straights thanks to drafting and even managed to outbrake Soper at the end of Mountain Straight to take the lead in a move which surprised the Englishman. Unfortunately for the team, veteran Smith was some 8 seconds a lap slower than Miedecke which translated to lost time to the other leaders. The car also suffered two flat batteries mid-race thanks to a faulty alternator which put them out of contention. Car #35 eventually finished in 17th place, covering 144 of the 161 laps.

Miedecke then qualified the Sierra an impressive 3rd a week later for the Bob Jane T-Marts 500 at Calder Park in Melbourne, and although the car was retired after just 58 of the 120 laps, Mad Andy would set the fastest lap of the race with a time of 1:45.03 for the 4.216 km (2.620 mi) circuit which combined the 2.280 km (1.417 mi) road course with the then new 1.801 km (1.119 mi) NASCAR style high-banked "Thunderdome" oval speedway. As of 2016 this lap record still stands.

With Don Smith retiring, Andrew Miedecke took ownership of the team in 1988. A second customer car was entered for New Zealander Andrew Bagnall who was making the bold step up from the baby car class. Struggling for sponsorship (though OXO still remained it was in a reduced capacity), the cars proved fast but unreliable and while Miedecke often seemed the most likely to challenge the superiority shown by the Shell Sierras of Dick Johnson and Miedecke's former open wheel adversary John Bowe, bad luck brought about by a lack of money often robbed the team of good results. Miedecke scored his first pole position in touring car racing for Round 7 of the ATCC at Sandown, but his race lasted only a few hundred metres as clutch failure put him out before the first turn. In a show of appreciation for his efforts in trying to break the Shell team's monopoly in 1988, the crowd at Sandown applauded Miedecke as he walked back to the pits.

For the 1988 Tooheys 1000, the team would be joined by Eggenberger Motorsport drivers Steve Soper and Pierre Dieudonné, an ironic situation considering the Miedecke cars were running Rouse technology, with Rouse being one of the chief Sierra rivals of the Eggenberger team in Britain and Europe. Unfortunately the 1988 Tooheys 1000 turned out to be a disaster for the team. Although both cars qualified in the top 10, Miedecke had crashed his car at the top of the mountain during Friday qualifying meaning an overnight rebuild for the TAFE crash repair team. Then during Saturday afternoon's final practice session Soper (who co-drove with Mad Andy) had a 200 km/h (124 mph) spin on Conrod straight when a tyre deflated, though the English ace was able to keep the car off the concrete walls. Their challenge ended early as the team found that the replacement turbo hoses they had used in the rebuild did not have the required aluminium heat shielding on the inside. Just 2 laps into the race the hose could not take the pressure and split causing a loss of boost (the hose had been used in the Tooheys Top 10 as well as Saturday's final practice). As the team did not have the resources for adequate spares all that could be done was to keep replacing the hose and suffering a loss of turbo boost. Although during the middle section of the race it was the fastest car on the track, the Sierra was eventually retired on lap 102 with a split bore. Belgian motoring journalist Dieudonné (Soper's usual co-driver in the Eggenberger team) was promoted to lead driver over Bagnall in car #8 and qualified the car in a credible 7th place. However a blown head gasket ended their race on lap 9.

Following Bathurst, Miedecke and Soper would go on to win the Promo Touring Car 500 at the Pukekohe Park Raceway in New Zealand.

In 1989, Miedecke would gain much needed sponsorship from Yokohama and Kenwood. However having a car destroyed by fire in Round 3 of the ATCC at Lakeside was a big setback, although Miedecke and Bagnall would later go on to win the Oran Park 300. Miedecke Motorsport also began servicing a second customer car for Kevin Waldock's Playscape Racing in 1989. Waldock's explosives company Blast Dynamics had been Miedecke's main sponsor at Bathurst in 1988 and remained as a sponsor through 1989.

The 1989 Tooheys 1000 at Bathurst was again a disaster for the team. Both cars again qualified in the top 10 with Miedecke, partnered by Charlie O'Brien, qualifying 6th as he had done in 1988. Andrew Bagnall, partnered by fellow Kiwi Graeme Crosby, would start tenth after failing to complete his Tooheys Top 10 runoff lap when he crashed the Sierra at Sulman Park. Miedecke actually got a good start in the Sierra and was 4th heading up Mountain Straight behind the Sierras of Peter Brock, Dick Johnson and German Klaus Niedzwiedz in Allan Moffat's Eggenberger built car. However a complete gearbox failure going up the mountain ended his race before he had completed half a lap to be the races first retirement. It was the second time in four races at Bathurst (after 1986) that Miedecke's own car had failed to complete a lap of the race. Bagnall and Crosby had a steady run in their repaired car before retiring with head gasket failure on lap 97.

Bathurst would prove to be the final outing for the team as they did not enter the season ending Yokohama Cup Group A Support Race at the 1989 Australian Grand Prix in Adelaide.

At the end of 1989, the team was disbanded with Miedecke moving to Peter Brock's Mobil 1 Racing while some of the team's assets moved to Playscape Racing.

=== GT ===
In 2015, Andrew Miedecke purchased an Aston Martin Vantage GT3, which in collaboration with Ross Stone ran in the final two rounds of the 2015 Australian GT Championship. In 2016, Miedecke purchased two further Vantage GT3s, from Craft-Bamboo Racing, to compete both in Australian GT and GT Asia, this time collaborating with Matt Stone Racing. Andrew Miedecke, driving with son George, went on to win the second round of the 2016 Australian Endurance Championship at Sydney Motorsport Park.

In 2024, Miedecke Motorsport participated in the inaugural GT4 Australia series. In the first round at Phillip Island, George Miedecke and Rylan Gray claimed the first race win for the Ford Mustang S650 GT4 outside of North America.
