= 1989 Australian Touring Car season =

Seasons
- ← 1988 1990 →

The 1989 Australian Touring Car season was the 30th year of touring car racing in Australia since the first runnings of the Australian Touring Car Championship and the fore-runner of the present day Bathurst 1000, the Armstrong 500.

There were 12 touring car race meetings held during 1990; an eight-round series, the 1989 Australian Touring Car Championship (ATCC); a support programme event at the 1989 Australian Grand Prix and three long-distance races, nicknamed 'enduros'.

== Results and standings ==
=== Race calendar ===
The 1989 Australian touring car season consisted of 12 events.

| Date | Series | Circuit | City / state | Winner | Team | Car | Report |
|---|---|---|---|---|---|---|---|
| 5 March | ATCC Round 1 | Amaroo Park | Sydney, New South Wales | John Bowe | Shell Ultra-Hi Racing | Ford Sierra RS500 | |
| 12 March | ATCC Round 2 | Symmons Plains Raceway | Launceston, Tasmania | Dick Johnson | Shell Ultra-Hi Racing | Ford Sierra RS500 | |
| 16 April | ATCC Round 3 | Lakeside International Raceway | Brisbane, Queensland | Dick Johnson | Shell Ultra-Hi Racing | Ford Sierra RS500 | |
| 30 April | ATCC Round 4 | Barbagallo Raceway | Perth, Western Australia | John Bowe | Shell Ultra-Hi Racing | Ford Sierra RS500 | |
| 7 May | ATCC Round 5 | Mallala Motor Sport Park | Mallala, South Australia | Dick Johnson | Shell Ultra-Hi Racing | Ford Sierra RS500 | |
| 21 May | ATCC Round 6 | Sandown Raceway | Melbourne, Victoria | Dick Johnson | Shell Ultra-Hi Racing | Ford Sierra RS500 | |
| 4 June | ATCC Round 7 | Winton Motor Raceway | Benalla, Victoria | George Fury | Nissan Motorsport Australia | Nissan Skyline HR31 GTS-R | |
| 9 July | ATCC Round 8 | Oran Park Raceway | Sydney, New South Wales | Peter Brock | Mobil 1 Racing | Ford Sierra RS500 | |
| 19 August | Pepsi 300 | Oran Park Raceway | Sydney, New South Wales | Andrew Miedecke; Andrew Bagnall | Miedecke Motorsport | Ford Sierra RS500 | report |
| 10 September | .05 - 500 | Sandown Raceway | Melbourne, Victoria | Jim Richards; Mark Skaife | Nissan Motorsport Australia | Nissan Skyline HR31 GTS-R | report |
| 1 October | Tooheys 1000 | Mount Panorama Circuit | Bathurst, New South Wales | Dick Johnson; John Bowe | Shell Ultra-Hi Racing | Ford Sierra RS500 | report |
| 4–5 November | Yokohama Cup Group A Race | Adelaide Street Circuit | Adelaide, South Australia | Tony Longhurst | Benson & Hedges Racing | Ford Sierra RS500 | |

=== Yokohama Cup Group A Races ===
This meeting was a support event of the 1989 Australian Grand Prix. This was the first time that the Group A cars ran two races at the Australian Grand Prix meeting, one on the Saturday afternoon and the second on the Sunday morning.

| Driver | No. | Team | Car | Race 1 | Race 2 |
|---|---|---|---|---|---|
| (Australia) Tony Longhurst | 25 | Benson & Hedges Racing | Ford Sierra RS500 | 1 | 1 |
| (Australia) Colin Bond | 4 | Caltex CXT Racing | Ford Sierra RS500 | 5 | 2 |
| (Australia) Dick Johnson | 17 | Shell Ultra-Hi Racing | Ford Sierra RS500 | 7 | 3 |
| (New Zealand) Jim Richards | 2 | Nissan Motorsport Australia | Nissan Skyline HR31 GTS-R | 4 | 4 |
| (Australia) Peter Brock | 05 | Mobil 1 Racing | Ford Sierra RS500 | 2 | 5 |
| (Australia) Allan Grice | 40 | ICL Racing | Holden VL Commodore SS Group A SV | 8 | 6 |
| (Australia) George Fury | 3 | Nissan Motorsport Australia | Nissan Skyline HR31 GTS-R | 6 | 7 |
| (United Kingdom) Win Percy | 16 | Holden Racing Team | Holden VL Commodore SS Group A SV | 3 | DNF |
