= Playscape Racing =

Australian motor racing team

- Manufacturer: Ford
- Team Principal: Kevin Waldock
- Race Drivers: Kevin Waldock (1989–98); Bryan Thompson (1989); Mike Preston (1990, 1993–94); Brett Peters (1991–93); Mark McLaughlin (1995, 1998); Wayne Park (1996); John Smith (1997); Ashley Stitchbury (1998)
- Chassis: Sierra RS500; EB Falcon; EF Falcon
- Debut: 1989

Playscape Racing was an Australian motor racing team that competed in Australian touring car racing between 1989 and 1998.

== History ==
At the 1988 Bathurst 1000, explosives entrepreneur Kevin Waldock's Blast Dynamics came on board as a sponsor of Miedecke Motorsport’s Ford Sierra RS500. For 1989, Waldock contracted Miedecke Motorsport to build and maintain customer RS500. However following the destruction of Andrew Miedecke's own car at Lakeside, this car was taken over by Miedecke and another car built for Waldock, debuting at the Oran Park 300.

The car was painted yellow, a livery all Playscape Racing cars would carry. Following Miedecke closing the team and joining Mobil 1 Racing, Waldock formed his own team on the Gold Coast with Miedecke Motorsport personnel including Ross and Jim Stone. In 1991, Playscape finished third at the Sandown 500 and fifth at the Bathurst 1000.

With the arrival of the V8 Supercars era, a Ford EB Falcon was built in Auckland debuting at the 1993 Sandown 500. Two years later, Playscape debuted an EF Falcon. The team would appear in selected rounds of the Australian Touring Car Championship as well as the Bathurst 1000.

Waldock had suffered from heart related health issues, being forced to miss Bathurst in 1993 and 1998, with the latter being the team's last appearance.
