= 1989 Australian Manufacturers' Championship =

The 1989 Australian Manufacturers' Championship was a CAMS sanctioned motor racing title for vehicle manufacturers. It was contested concurrently with the 1989 Australian Touring Car Championship over an eight round series with each round staged as a single race of approximately one hour's duration.

== Calendar ==
| Round | Date | Circuit | Location |
|---|---|---|---|
| 1 | 5 March | Amaroo Park | Sydney, New South Wales |
| 2 | 12 March | Symmons Plains | Launceston, Tasmania |
| 3 | 16 April | Lakeside | Brisbane, Queensland |
| 4 | 30 April | Wanneroo Park | Perth, Western Australia |
| 5 | 7 May | Mallala | Mallala, South Australia |
| 6 | 21 May | Sandown | Melbourne, Victoria |
| 7 | 4 June | Winton | Benalla, Victoria |
| 8 | 9 July | Oran Park | Sydney, New South Wales |

== Class structure ==
The series was open to Touring Cars complying with CAMS Group 3A regulations, commonly referred to as Group A Touring Cars. Cars competed in three engine capacity classes:

- Up to 2000cc which featured Toyota Corollas and a Nissan Gazelle
- 2001 to 3000cc which featured BMW M3s
- 3001 to 6000cc which featured Ford Sierras, Nissan Skylines and Holden Commodores

Points were awarded on a 9-6-4-3-2-1 basis to the top six finishers in each class at each round however only the highest scoring car of each make at each round could earn points. The best seven round results were retained by each manufacturer.

== Results ==
| Position | Make | Car | R1 | R2 | R3 | R4 | R5 | R6 | R7 | R8 | Total |
|---|---|---|---|---|---|---|---|---|---|---|---|
| 1 | Toyota | Corolla | 9 | 9 | (3) | 9 | 9 | 9 | 9 | 9 | 63 (66) |
| 2 | Ford | Sierra RS500 | 9 | 9 | (4.5) | 9 | 9 | 9 | 6 | 9 | 60 (64.5) |
| 3 | Nissan | Skyline GTS-R31 & Gazelle | 6 | 4 | 4.5 | 4 | 6 | 3 | 9 | (1) | 36.5 (37.5) |
| 4 | BMW | M3 | - | - | - | - | - | - | - | 9 | 9 |
| 5 | Holden | Commodore VL SS Group A SV | - | - | - | - | - | - | 3 | - | 3 |

Note: Only half points were awarded for Round 3 at Lakeside as the initial race was stopped due to an accident and the duration of the restarted race was reduced to 30 minutes.
