= Andrew Bagnall =

New Zealand racing driver (born 1947)

- Nationality: New Zealand
- Born: John Andrew Bagnall; 14 February 1947 (age 79) Wellington, New Zealand
- Categorisation: FIA Bronze

John Andrew Bagnall (born 14 February 1947) is a former motor racing driver.

== Career ==
Bagnall raced in the Australian Touring Car Championship in the late 1980s, in the New Zealand Touring Car Championship in 1990, and in some of the races in the 1997 and 1998 FIA GT Championship seasons. In 1999, he moved to the United States Road Racing Championship before filling in for other drivers in the American Le Mans Series for a few years. In 2004, he raced the full Australian Porsche Carrera Cup season.

Bagnall holds a Commerce degree from Otago University. He was sponsored for his MBA from Michigan State University in 1973 by travel operator Atlantic & Pacific, where he went on to work for three years following his return. He then went on to establish Gullivers Travel Group which became a major distributor of wholesale and retail travel services in New Zealand. Gullivers Travel Group was eventually listed on the New Zealand and Australian stock exchanges (ASX), and was subsequently sold to ASX listed S8.

Bagnall was also involved in co-developing one of New Zealand’s first commercial retirement villages, and now runs his own private investment company, Segoura, which manages investments in various businesses. Bagnall is also a director of PowerShield Limited.

Bagnall was a significant investor in Life Pharmacy Limited and following its merger with Pharmacy Brands Limited (later renamed Green Cross Health Limited), he has continued to hold a significant shareholding in the merged entity. Andrew was appointed as a Non-Executive Director of the company in August 2009. With 354 pharmacies under the Unichem and Life Pharmacy brands along with 39 medical centres, 300 doctors and 340 nurses - Green Cross also has more than 20,000 clients through Access Community Health. However, the 2017/18 financial year was not a happy one owing to having to meet a pay equity shortfall, which reduced the annual profit by 15% to $16.8m on improved revenue of $522m.

Bagnall owns a $US65 million Gulfstream G650 and lives in a Herne Bay property worth $18.5m.

== Car Collection ==
Bagnall is famous for his collection of exotic cars and used to own the rarest model of the McLaren F1, the F1 HDF. In August 2019, it was auctioned by RM Sotheby's at Monterey Car Week in Monterey, California for a price of US$19.8 million (NZ$30.7 million). Among Bagnall's collection of hyper-cars is a 'magnesium silver' McLaren P1, and a red (Rosso Dubai) Pagani Huayra, the latter of which is the only car of its kind in New Zealand. Bagnall also owns a 'Victory Grey' McLaren Senna.

== Career results ==
=== Career summary ===
Season	Series	Team	Races	Wins	Poles	F. Laps	Podiums	Points	Position
1986	Australian Touring Car Championship	Motor Sport Pacific	1	0	0	0	0	8	37th
1986	Australian Endurance Championship	Andrew Bagnall	2	0	0	0	0	0	N/A
1986	AMSCAR Series		1	0	0	0	0	0	N/A
1987	World Touring Car Championship	Team Toyota GB; Gullivers Travel	5	0	0	0	0	0	N/A
1987	European Touring Car Championship - Div. 2	Team Toyota GB; Gullivers Travel	5	0	0	0	0	0	N/A
1988	European Touring Car Championship - Div. 2	Chris Hodgetts Motorsport	1	0	0	0	0	0	N/A
1988	Australian Touring Car Championship	Miedecke Motorsport	9	0	0	0	0	25	10th
1988	Asia-Pacific Touring Car Championship	Miedecke Motorsport	3	0	0	0	0	0	N/A
1989	Australian Touring Car Championship	Miedecke Motorsport	3	0	0	0	0	4	15th
1990	Australian Endurance Championship	Playscape Racing	3	0	0	0	0	8	20th
1996	24 Hours of Le Mans - GT2	New Hardware PARR Motorsport	1	0	0	0	0	0	4th
1997	FIA GT Championship - GT2	Seikel Motorsport	1	0	0	0	0	0	N/A
1998	FIA GT Championship - GT2	Seikel Motorsport	1	0	0	0	0	0	N/A
2001	24 Hours of Le Mans - GT	Seikel Motorsport	1	0	0	0	0	0	6th
2001	American Le Mans Series - GT	Seikel Motorsport	2	0	0	0	0	8	75th
2001	Grand American Road Racing Championship - GT	Seikel Motorsport	1	0	0	0	0	0	N/A
2002	FIA GT Championship - GT	Seikel Motorsport	1	0	0	0	0	2.5	40th
2002	American Le Mans Series - GT	Seikel Motorsport	2	0	0	0	0	41	27th
2003	American Le Mans Series - GT	Seikel Motorsport	1	0	0	0	0	0	N/A
2003	Australian Carrera Cup Championship	International Motorsport	9	0	0	0	0	22	32nd
2003	Bridgestone New Zealand Porsche Championship	International Motorsport	15	0	0	0	0	183	12th
2004	24 Hours of Le Mans - GT	Seikel Motorsport	1	0	0	0	0	0	4th
2004	Porsche GT3 Cup Trans-Tasman	International Motorsport	9	0	0	0	0	285	11th
2005	Battery Town Porsche GT3 Cup Challenge	International Motorsport	16	0	0	0	0	552	11th
2006	Battery Town Porsche GT3 Cup Challenge	International Motorsport	15	0	0	0	0	453	14th
2007	Battery Town Porsche GT3 Cup Challenge	International Motorsport	11	0	0	0	0	216	19th
2009	Battery Town Porsche GT3 Cup Challenge	International Motorsport	11	0	0	0	0	256	13th
2010	Battery Town Porsche GT3 Cup Challenge	International Motorsport	15	0	0	0	0	642	11th
2011	Battery Town Porsche GT3 Cup Challenge	International Motorsport	11	0	0	0	0	117	16th
2017	Australian Endurance Championship	International Motorsport	2	0	0	0	0	187	17th

=== Complete Australian Touring Car Championship results ===
(key) (Races in bold indicate pole position) (Races in italics indicate fastest lap)

Year	Team	Car	1	2	3	4	5	6	7	8	9	10	DC	Points
1986	(New Zealand) Andrew Bagnall	Ford Escort RS1600i	AMA	SYM	SAN	AIR	WAN	SUR; 14	CAL	LAK	WIN	ORA	37th	8
1988	(Australia) Miedecke Motorsport	Ford Sierra RS500	CAL; 6	SYM; 11	WIN; 4	WAN; Ret	AIR; Ret	LAK; 9	SAN; 6	AMA; Ret	ORA; 10		10th	25
1989	(Australia) Miedecke Motorsport	Ford Sierra RS500	AMA; Ret	SYM; 7	LAK; Ret	WAN	MAL	SAN	WIN; 15	ORA; 9			16th	4

=== Complete World Touring Car Championship results ===
(key) (Races in bold indicate pole position) (Races in italics indicate fastest lap)

Year	Team	Car	1	2	3	4	5	6	7	8	9	10	11	DC	Points
1987	(United Kingdom) Team Toyota GB	Toyota Corolla GT	MNZ ovr:10 cls:1	JAR	DIJ	NUR	SPA; Ret	BNO	SIL ovr:16 cls:1					NC	0
1987	(New Zealand) Gullivers Travel	Toyota Sprinter AE86								BAT; Ret	CLD; DNS	WEL ovr:16 cls:1	FJI; Ret	NC	0

† Not eligible for series points

=== Complete Asia-Pacific Touring Car Championship results ===
(key) (Races in bold indicate pole position) (Races in italics indicate fastest lap)

Year	Team	Car	1	2	3	4	DC	Points
1988	(Australia) Miedecke Motorsport	Ford Sierra RS500	BAT; Ret	WEL; NC	PUK; 7	FJI; DNS	NC	0

=== Complete 24 Hours of Le Mans results ===
Year	Team	Co-drivers	Car	Class	Laps	Pos.	Class pos.
1996	(New Zealand) New Hardware Racing (United Kingdom) Parr Motorsport	(Monaco) Stéphane Ortelli (United States) Andy Pilgrim	Porsche 911 GT2	GT2	299	17th	**2nd**
2001	(Germany) Seikel Motorsport	(Canada) Tony Burgess (Morocco) Max Cohen-Olivar	Porsche 996 GT3-RS	GT	272	12th	6th
2003	(Germany) Seikel Motorsport	(Canada) Anthony Burgess (Canada) David Shep	Porsche 996 GT3-RS	GT	134	DNF	DNF
2004	(Germany) Seikel Motorsport	(Canada) Anthony Burgess (United States) Philip Collin	Porsche 996 GT3-RS	GT	317	15th	4th

=== Complete Bathurst 1000 results ===
Year	Team	Co-drivers	Car	Class	Laps	Pos.	Class pos.
1986	(New Zealand) Motorsport Pacific Ltd.	(New Zealand) Ted Jarvis	Ford Escort RS 1600i	A	23	DNF	DNF
1987	(New Zealand) Gullivers travel Limited	(United Kingdom) Chris Hodgetts (New Zealand) Mark Jennings	Toyota Sprinter AE86	3	77	DNF	DNF
1988	(Australia) Andrew Bagnall	(Belgium) Pierre Dieudonné	Ford Sierra RS500	A	9	DNF	DNF
1989	(Australia) Miedecke Motorsport	(New Zealand) Graeme Crosby	Ford Sierra RS500	A	97	DNF	DNF
1990	(Australia) Gullivers Travels Inc.	(New Zealand) Robbie Francevic	Ford Sierra RS500	1	155	7th	7th

=== Complete Bathurst 24 Hour results ===
Year	Team	Co-drivers	Car	Class	Laps	Pos.	Class pos.
2002	(Germany) Seikel Motorsport	(Canada) Anthony Burgess (United States) John Lloyd (Germany) Jürgen Alzen	Porsche 996 GT3-RS	1	52	DNF	DNF

=== Complete Bathurst 12 Hour results ===
Year	Team	Co-drivers	Car	Class	Laps	Pos.	Class pos.
2016	(New Zealand) International Motorsport	(New Zealand) Matt Halliday (New Zealand) Rick Armstrong	Audi R8 LMS ultra	AA	287	11th	**3rd**
2018	(New Zealand) International Motorsport	(New Zealand) Matt Halliday (New Zealand) Jonny Reid	Audi R8 LMS	APA	41	DNF	DNF
