= 1988 Tooheys 1000 =

Motor race in Australia

Seasons
- ← 1987 1989 →

Layout of the Mount Panorama Circuit

The 1988 Tooheys 1000 was a 1000 km endurance motor race for Group A Touring Cars. It was held on 2 October 1988 at the Mount Panorama Circuit just outside Bathurst in New South Wales, Australia. The race was the opening round of the 1988 Asia-Pacific Touring Car Championship and was the 29th running of the Bathurst 1000.

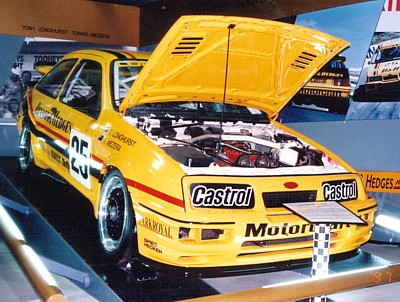
The race winning Longhurst/Mezera Ford Sierra RS500

The 1988 edition was the only race in the history of the Bathurst 1000 to have commenced with a rolling start.

The race was won by Tony Longhurst and Tomas Mezera driving a Ford Sierra RS500.

== Controversy ==
On the Friday afternoon immediately at the close of final qualifying, Holden Special Vehicles driver Tom Walkinshaw lodged a formal protest against the leading Australian Ford Sierras, targeting all three Dick Johnson Racing (DJR) cars, along with the Tony Longhurst and Colin Bond entries. No European-built Fords (or those with some European build/driver connection) were protested, Walkinshaw claiming it was only the Australian cars as they were the fastest, despite the presence of the Eggenberger Motorsport built Allan Moffat ANZ Sierra as fourth fastest qualifier (faster than Bond and the third DJR entry). Also left alone in the protest was the Sierra of teammates Andrew Miedecke (fifth in a car with a technical link to Andy Rouse, while Miedecke's co-driver at Bathurst was Steve Soper) and Andrew Bagnall (seventh set by co-driver Pierre Dieudonné), and the Team CMS Sweden Sierra (tenth).

The feeling among the protested Australian Sierra teams was that the protest was designed to severely disrupt their race preparations, with only Longhurst's team able to get their Sierra somewhere near its pre-protest speed. All three teams had to pull their cars' engines and suspension apart after Friday's qualifying for the scrutineers before having to put them back together again before Saturday's Tooheys Top Ten. This was particularly disruptive for Dick Johnson's team as they had all three of their cars protested, despite the #18 car only qualifying 12th compared to Johnson's pole and John Bowe in second. The protest prompted DJR team owner Johnson to say at a press conference that Walkinshaw would "Protest against the cut in his bagpipes if he could" and that "All he wants to do is win and he doesn't care how he does it".

The Walkinshaw protest was countered by DJR team manager Neal Lowe who protested the three HSV team Holden Commodores, calling on his knowledge of the Commodore from his time with the old Holden Dealer Team in 1986. The counter-protest by DJR focused on the front air dam, steering rack and the size of the rear spoiler on only the factory backed Commodores.

On race day, Walkinshaw advised the Australian Racing Drivers Club (ARDC) and FISA officials that should one of the protested cars win the race, his protest against that car was to be immediately withdrawn. His reasons given for this was so that the winner would be known on the day rather than months later, as had been the case with the 1987 race.

Ultimately the Walkinshaw protests were found to be invalid and was dismissed. The HSV team cars had been entered by Perkins Motorsport and not by TWR, therefore as he was only a driver at the meeting, the Scot had no authority to lodge a protest and the stewards of the meeting erred in allowing it to proceed (all it would have taken to rectify was the signature of Larry Perkins replacing Walkinshaw's). Eventually though, all of the Sierras were cleared by FISA (the winning Longhurst Sierra had the protest against it withdrawn while Bond's car was initially found to have an illegal turbo and was excluded from its 3rd place. It was Bond's team however who proved that Walkinshaw's protest was invalid, thus so was the ruling on their turbo. As a result, the 3rd place finish stood). However, the damage was done to the leading Australian Fords and it was only race winners Tony Longhurst Racing who managed to get their car back up to speed after being dismantled by scrutineers on the Friday before the Top Ten run off. For their part, the Caltex Sierra of Bond and Alan Jones had its original turbo impounded (the one initially found to be illegal), with the teams only spare being of inferior size and quality which Bond told dropped power from a claimed 500 bhp (373 kW; 507 PS) to around 450 bhp (336 kW; 456 PS), or around the speed level of the leading Holden Commodore's of Larry Perkins and Allan Grice.

In an ironic twist, the DJR protest against two of the three HSV team cars (only the Perkins built cars and not the TWR British built Walkinshaw/Jeff Allam car) was successful with the modifications made to the cars steering racks found to be illegal. As the results had already been published by the time the protest came to its conclusion, ultimately the Australian Racing Drivers Club saw no need to change the results to show the cars as disqualified as the spare HSV Car (#40) was only driven in Wednesday's practice session, while the Perkins/Denny Hulme/Walkinshaw #10 car, as well as the #20 Walkinshaw/Allam car both failed to finish. The fact that the Perkins built cars were disqualified and the Sierras were cleared raised some eyebrows among Larry's fellow competitors as during the 1988 Australian Touring Car Championship, Perkins had been quite vocal in his belief that the Sierras were running illegally and was pushing for CAMS to enforce the Group A rules.

== Race summary ==
The 1988 race, under the first time sponsorship of Tooheys Brewery, was won by Tony Longhurst and Tomas Mezera driving a Ford Sierra RS500. It was the first victory in the "Bathurst 1000" for a turbocharged vehicle, and the first victory by a four-cylinder car since Bob Holden and Rauno Aaltonen won in a Morris Cooper S in 1966. It was also the only time in the race's history that there was a rolling start, as dictated by FISA regulations, rather than the traditional standing start. The Ford Sierras dominated the race as expected, but reliability had plagued the Fords. Several that had led the race retired, however sufficient examples finished to fill the three podium positions. Second was the last survivor of the three-car Dick Johnson Racing team, driven by former factory Toyota racer John Smith and DJR lead drivers Dick Johnson and John Bowe whose own hastily re-built cars had both failed early. Alfredo Costanzo qualified in the #18 DJR Sierra but did not get to race, as Johnson and Bowe took over that car. Third was the Caltex-sponsored Sierra of Colin Bond and 1980 Formula One World Champion Alan Jones. The Caltex Sierra had to survive the Walkinshaw protest and post race disqualification (later overruled) to be finally classified third in December 1988. Indeed, it was Bond who successfully argued that Walkinshaw had no authority to lodge the original protest. Unfortunately for Bond, as a result of the protest his car had lost what the team considered to be their best turbocharger and they were forced to use their spare engine for the race which was reported to be some 50 bhp (37 kW; 51 PS) down on their main rivals putting their race speed at around the same level as the leading Commodore's which was around 3–4 seconds per lap slower than they had been expecting.

Defending race winners Peter Brock, David Parsons and Peter McLeod all failed to finish the race. Brock and Parsons, driving BMW M3s for Brock's Mobil 1 Racing, were both out with engine trouble just after halfway through the race. It had been hoped by the team that the reliability shown by the BMW's in the European Touring Car Championship against the much faster, but still relatively fragile Ford Sierras would see them leading late in the race. Ironically the reverse was true and it was the factory backed BMW's which proved fragile. The Brock/Jim Richards/Neil Crompton car was out of contention early when Brock, following Smith in the 3rd DJR Sierra down Conrod Straight, ran over a tyre carcass at some 240 km/h (149 mph) which ripped off the front spoiler and the oil cooler from the AU$60,000 BMW Motorsport engine, while the Parsons/Richards car also suffered from engine trouble. McLeod, driving one of the new "Walkinshaw" Holden Commodores (although the car was built by Brock's team) with Melbourne solicitor Jim Keogh, was out with engine failure on lap 7. It was the team's second engine failure of the day having lost their race engine in the Sunday morning warmup session forcing the team into a rapid engine change that saw them start the race from pit lane. It was a cruel blow for the McLeod team after both McLeod and Keogh had crashed during practice and qualifying, but work on the car and a Saturday night guess at a setup change had seen McLeod lap over one second faster in the race morning warmup than either driver had managed in qualifying.

Class 2 was won by the BMW M3 of New Zealand's Trevor Crowe and "Captain" Peter Janson who finished a strong fourth outright. Class 3, for cars up to 1600cc, was predictably won by the Toyota Team Australia Corolla GT of John Faulkner and Drew Price who finished ninth outright after an all-day sprint. This marked the first time that a small capacity class car had finished in the top ten at Bathurst since 1978.

The race saw the 18th and last start for 1983 James Hardie 1000 winner John Harvey. He drove a Holden Commodore with fellow Sydney veteran and 1974 race winner Kevin Bartlett to finish in 14th place. As an employee of Holden Special Vehicles (HSV) which was owned by Tom Walkinshaw, Harvey was initially barred from racing due to a Walkinshaw rule that senior management (Harvey was HSV's Marketing Manager) other than himself was barred from what he deemed as dangerous activities, which included motor racing. However, given Harvey's long-standing record in motor racing going back to the late 1950s, Walkinshaw eventually relented and allowed Harvey to drive at Bathurst.

== Class structure ==
Cars competed in three engine capacity classes.

=== Class 1 ===
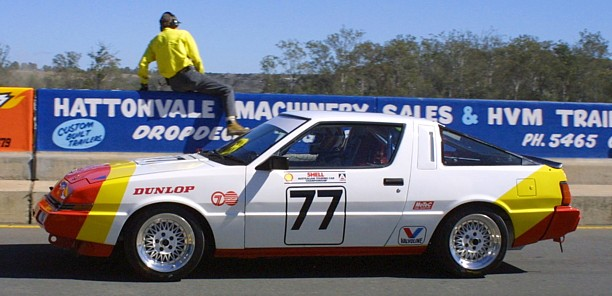
Taylor/Kennedy Mitsubishi Starion

For cars of over 2500cc engine capacity. The Class featured;
1 BMW 635 CSi,
12 Ford Sierra RS500's,
16 Holden VL Commodore SS Group A's,
4 Holden VK Commodore SS Group A's, 3 Mitsubishi Starion Turbo's,
2 Nissan Skyline HR31 GTS-R's

=== Class 2 ===
For cars of 1601-2500cc engine capacity. The Class featured;
5 BMW M3's,
1 Mercedes-Benz 190E.

=== Class 3 ===
For cars of up to 1600cc engine capacity. The Class featured;
4 Toyota Corolla GT AE86's,
3 Toyota Corolla FX-GT AE82's,
1 Toyota Corolla GT,

== Tooheys Dozen ==
Due to FISA regulations the Top 10 run-off was not for Pole Position in 1988, but only for AUD$40,000 in prizemoney. With the exception of 2022, this was the only time since the run off began as Hardies Heroes in 1978 that the top 10 grid positions had not been decided in the run off. As a result, the Australian Racing Drivers Club invited non-top 10 qualifiers and former race winners Allan Grice (Holden Commodore – 11th) and Peter Brock (BMW M3 – 16th) to participate.

After 10 years of being known as "Hardies Heroes", the name of the runoff was changed to the "Tooheys Top 10" (dozen for 1988) to go along with new race sponsor Tooheys Brewery.

| Pos | No | Team | Driver | Car | TD | Qual |
|---|---|---|---|---|---|---|
| 1 | 9 | Allan Moffat Enterprises | (West Germany) Klaus Niedzwiedz | Ford Sierra RS500 | 2:18.24 | 2:18.02 |
| 2 | 25 | Benson & Hedges Racing | (Australia) Tony Longhurst | Ford Sierra RS500 | 2:18.51 | 2:17.96 |
| 3 | 28 | Shell Ultra Hi Racing | (Australia) John Bowe | Ford Sierra RS500 | 2:18.95 | 2:17.52 |
| 4 | 17 | Shell Ultra Hi Racing | (Australia) Dick Johnson | Ford Sierra RS500 | 2:19.22 | 2:16.46 |
| 5 | 6 | Miedecke Motorsport | (Australia) Andrew Miedecke | Ford Sierra RS500 | 2:19.60 | 2:18.78 |
| 6 | 4 | Caltex CXT Racing Team | (Australia) Colin Bond | Ford Sierra RS500 | 2:20.33 | 2:19.84 |
| 7 | 8 | Andrew Bagnall | (Belgium) Pierre Dieudonné | Ford Sierra RS500 | 2:20.71 | 2:20.34 |
| 8 | 21 | Team CMS Sweden | (Sweden) Ulf Granberg | Ford Sierra RS500 | 2:21.82 | 2:22.20 |
| 9 | 10 | Holden Special Vehicles | (Australia) Larry Perkins | Holden VL Commodore SS Group A SV | 2:22.47 | 2:21.00 |
| 10 | 15 | Peter Jackson Nissan Racing | (Australia) George Fury | Nissan Skyline HR31 GTS-R | 2:22.72 | 2:21.92* |
| 11 | 2 | ICL Racing | (Australia) Allan Grice | Holden VL Commodore SS Group A SV | 2:22.87 | 2:22.32 |
| 12 | 56 | Mobil 1 Racing | (Australia) Peter Brock | BMW M3 | 2:25.11 | 2:23.76 |

* 9th fastest qualifier George Fury used the #15 Nissan Skyline as co-driver Mark Skaife had crashed the #30 car in practice and it was still being repaired at the time of the Top 10. This was only allowed as the Top 10 didn't count for grid positions.
* Fury and former Volvo factory driver, Swedish train driver Ulf Granberg were the only drivers to actually go faster than their qualifying times.
* Jim Richards set the qualifying time of 2:23.76 in the #56 Mobil 1 Racing BMW M3, but Peter Brock drove the car in the runoff. Predictably in the underpowered, naturally aspirated 4 cyl BMW, Brock was the slowest in the runoff with a time over 2.2 seconds slower than 11th placed Allan Grice.
* Klaus Niedzwiedz became the second West German driver in succession to win the runoff after his Eggenberger teammate Klaus Ludwig had won in 1987. Driving Allan Moffat's Eggenberger built Ford Sierra RS500, Niedzwiedz's time of 2:18.24 was only 0.22 off his qualifying time the previous day. While this was still 1.28 seconds slower than Ludwig's 1987 time, it was 2.72 seconds faster than Niedzwiedz had gone in the 1987 runoff.
* As the shootout was not for grid positions, Tom Walkinshaw withdrew the #10 HSV Holden VL Commodore SS Group A SV of Larry Perkins (who was suffering from the flu). Its place was to be taken by the Mitsubishi Starion Turbo of 1986 pole winner Gary Scott. However, a determined Perkins was re-included and the Starion was removed from the list at the last minute.
* 1986 race winner Allan Grice had an unconventional start to his shootout lap as he had inadvertently found during qualifying that by using the escape road at Murrays Corner, the cars entry onto pit straight was faster thus giving a higher terminal speed before braking for Hell Corner. However, in the runoff it didn't help as his Les Small prepared Commodore finished 11th out of 12 and was 0.4 seconds slower than Perkins in the only other Commodore. In the days leading up to the race, and in the race itself via Ch.7's Racecam, Grice was openly critical of the Walkinshaw VL package, claiming that 1987's HDT version was actually faster (by the end of Group A in 1992, the fully developed Walkinshaw VL would eventually be lapping 7.3 seconds faster than the older HDT VL in qualifying).
* As a result of Grice using what technically wasn't part of the race track, from 1989 the ARDC banned the practice of using the Murray's Corner escape road to gain extra speed for qualifying or runoff laps.

== Official results ==
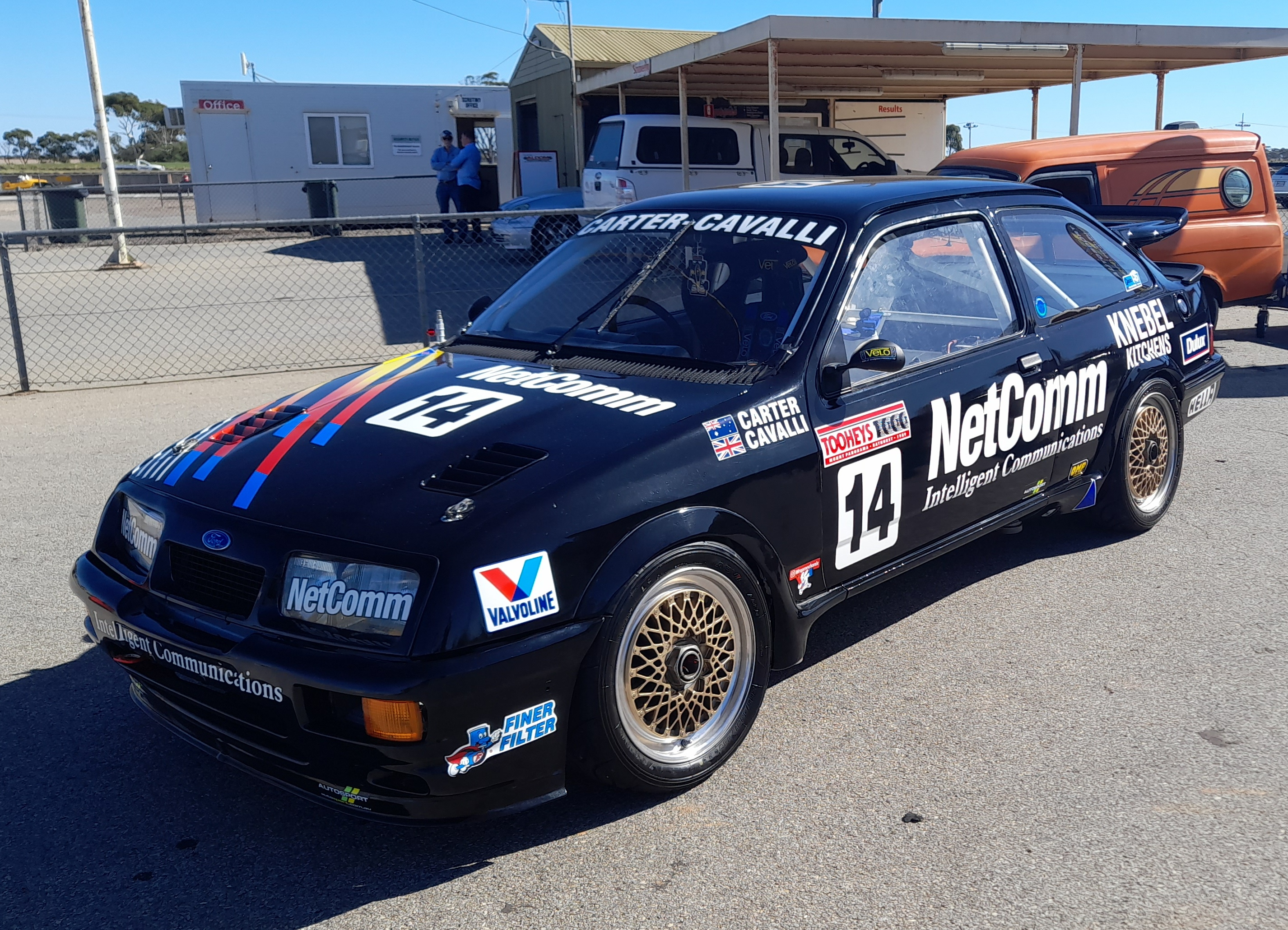
The Ford Sierra RS500 that was driven by Murray Carter and Steve Masterton. The car is pictured in 2023.

| Pos | Class | No | Team | Drivers | Car | Laps | Qual Pos |
|---|---|---|---|---|---|---|---|
| 1 | 1 | 25 | Benson & Hedges Racing | (Australia) Tony Longhurst (Australia) Tomas Mezera | Ford Sierra RS500 | 161 | 3 |
| 2 | 1 | 18 | Shell Ultra Hi Racing | (Australia) John Smith (Australia) Dick Johnson (Australia) John Bowe (Australia) Alfredo Costanzo | Ford Sierra RS500 | 160 | 12 |
| 3 | 1 | 4 | Caltex CXT Racing Team | (Australia) Colin Bond (Australia) Alan Jones | Ford Sierra RS500 | 158 | 6 |
| 4 | 2 | 53 | John Sax | (New Zealand) Trevor Crowe (New Zealand) Peter Janson | BMW M3 | 156 | 36 |
| 5 | 1 | 44 | Caltex CXT Racing Team | (Australia) Bruce Stewart (Australia) John Giddings | Ford Sierra RS500 | 155 | 28 |
| 6 | 1 | 37 | Brian Callaghan | (Australia) Brian Callaghan (Australia) Barry Graham | Holden VL Commodore SS Group A SV | 152 | 20 |
| 7 | 1 | 46 | Sunliner Campmobiles | (New Zealand) Tony Hunter (Australia) Steve Harrington | Holden VK Commodore SS Group A | 151 | 33 |
| 8 | 1 | 24 | Jagparts | (Australia) Gerald Kay (Australia) Geoff Munday | Holden VK Commodore SS Group A | 150 | 38 |
| 9 | 3 | 71 | Toyota Team Australia | (New Zealand) John Faulkner (Australia) Drew Price | Toyota Corolla GT | 146 | 41 |
| 10 | 1 | 31 | Ralliart Australia | (Australia) Terry Shiel (Australia) Brad Jones (Australia) Michael Preston | Mitsubishi Starion Turbo | 145 | 27 |
| 11 | 3 | 73 | Toyota Team Australia | (New Zealand) Brett Riley (Australia) Peter McKay | Toyota Corolla FX-GT AE82 | 145 | 42 |
| 12 | 3 | 74 | Bryan Bate | (New Zealand) Andrew Maher (New Zealand) Bryan Bate (New Zealand) Dave Barrow | Toyota Corolla GT AE86 | 145 | 43 |
| 13 | 1 | 23 | Chris Lambden | (United Kingdom) Chris Lambden (Australia) Kerry Baily | Holden VL Commodore SS Group A SV | 141 | 35 |
| 14 | 1 | 12 | Bob Forbes Racing | (Australia) Kevin Bartlett (Australia) John Harvey | Holden VL Commodore SS Group A SV | 140 | 22 |
| 15 | 1 | 2 | ICL Racing | (Australia) Allan Grice (United Kingdom) Win Percy | Holden VL Commodore SS Group A SV | 139 | 11 |
| 16 | 3 | 72 | Toyota Team Australia | (Australia) Mike Freeman (Australia) Mike Oliver | Toyota Corolla FX-GT AE82 | 133 | 44 |
| 17 | 3 | 78 | Bob Holden Motors | (Australia) Bob Holden (Australia) Jim Faneco (Australia) Damon Beck | Toyota Corolla FX-GT AE82 | 128 | 45 |
| 18 | 1 | 49 | Alcair Air Conditioning | (Australia) Bob Tindal (Australia) Wayne Park | Holden VL Commodore SS Group A | 127 | 32 |
| DNF | 1 | 22 | Lusty Engineering | (Australia) Graham Lusty (Australia) John Lusty | Holden VL Commodore SS Group A SV | 141 | 34 |
| DNF | 1 | 10 | Holden Special Vehicles | (Australia) Larry Perkins (New Zealand) Denny Hulme (United Kingdom) Tom Walkinshaw | Holden VL Commodore SS Group A SV | 137 | 8 |
| DNF | 1 | 39 | Lansvale Smash Repairs | (Australia) Steve Reed (Australia) Trevor Ashby | Holden VL Commodore SS Group A SV | 135 | 26 |
| DNF | 1 | 9 | Allan Moffat Enterprises | (Canada) Allan Moffat (Germany) Klaus Niedzwiedz (Australia) Gregg Hansford | Ford Sierra RS500 | 129 | 4 |
| NC | 1 | 41 | Mulvihill Motorsport | (Australia) Tony Mulvihill (Australia) Geoff Leeds (Australia) Barry Jones | Holden VL Commodore SS Group A SV | 118 | 31 |
| DNF | 3 | 75 | Belgrave 2-Way Radio Services | (Australia) David Ratcliff (Australia) Mike Mortimer | Toyota Corolla GT AE86 | 118 | 48 |
| NC | 2 | 55 | Bryce Racing | (New Zealand) Paul Radisich (West Germany) Ludwig Finauer | BMW M3 | 113 | 19 |
| DNF | 1 | 45 | Mark Petch Motorsport/ Wolf Racing Australasia | (New Zealand) Robbie Francevic (West Germany) Armin Hahne | Ford Sierra RS500 | 103 | 14 |
| DNF | 1 | 6 | Miedecke Motorsport | (Australia) Andrew Miedecke (United Kingdom) Steve Soper | Ford Sierra RS500 | 102 | 5 |
| DNF | 1 | 50 | Leeson Civil Engineering | (Australia) Garry Willmington (Australia) John Leeson | Holden VL Commodore SS Group A SV | 101 | 30 |
| DNF | 2 | 54 | John Sax | (New Zealand) John Sorenson (New Zealand) Kayne Scott (New Zealand) John Sax | BMW M3 | 100 | 40 |
| DNF | 2 | 56 | Mobil 1 Racing | (Australia) Peter Brock (Australia) Neil Crompton (New Zealand) Jim Richards | BMW M3 | 89 | 16 |
| NC | 3 | 76 | Bob Holden Motors | (Australia) Dennis Rogers (Australia) Garry Jones | Toyota Corolla GT AE86 | 89 | 47 |
| DNF | 1 | 16 | Ralliart Australia | (Australia) Gary Scott (Japan) Akihiko Nakaya | Mitsubishi Starion Turbo | 88 | 15 |
| NC | 3 | 77 | Marc Ducquet | (Australia) Marc Ducquet (Australia) Brian Selby | Toyota Corolla GT AE86 | 85 | 46 |
| DNF | 1 | 19 | Mathews/Finnigan Racing | (Australia) Terry Finnigan (Australia) Ken Mathews | Holden VL Commodore SS Group A SV | 84 | 23 |
| DNF | 1 | 26 | Formula 1 Investments | (Australia) Graham Moore (Australia) Tony Noske | Holden VL Commodore SS Group A SV | 79 | 21 |
| DNF | 2 | 57 | Mobil 1 Racing | (Australia) David 'Skippy' Parsons (New Zealand) Jim Richards (Australia) Neil Crompton | BMW M3 | 68 | 24 |
| DNF | 1 | 36 | Everlast Battery Service | (Australia) Bill O'Brien (Australia) Ray Lintott (Australia) Brian Sampson | Holden VL Commodore SS Group A SV | 66 | 25 |
| DNF | 1 | 33 | Garry Rogers Motorsport | (Australia) Garry Rogers (United States) John Andretti | Holden VL Commodore SS Group A SV | 37 | 18 |
| DNF | 2 | 51 | Phil Ward Racing | (Australia) Phil Ward (Australia) David Clement | Mercedes-Benz 190 E 2.3-16 | 27 | 39 |
| DNF | 1 | 28 | Shell Ultra Hi Racing | (Australia) John Bowe (United Kingdom) Robb Gravett (New Zealand) Neville Crichton | Ford Sierra RS500 | 26 | 2 |
| DNF | 1 | 17 | Shell Ultra Hi Racing | (Australia) Dick Johnson (Australia) John Bowe | Ford Sierra RS500 | 22 | 1 |
| DNF | 1 | 14 | Netcomm Australia | (Australia) Murray Carter (Australia) Steve Masterton | Ford Sierra RS500 | 22 | 37 |
| DNF | 1 | 30 | Peter Jackson Nissan Racing | (Australia) George Fury (Australia) Mark Skaife | Nissan Skyline HR31 GTS-R | 17 | 9 |
| DNF | 1 | 8 | Andrew Bagnall | (New Zealand) Andrew Bagnall (Belgium) Pierre Dieudonné | Ford Sierra RS500 | 9 | 7 |
| DNF | 1 | 3 | Yellow Pages | (Australia) Peter McLeod (Australia) Jim Keogh | Holden VL Commodore SS Group A SV | 7 | 29 |
| DNF | 1 | 21 | Team CMS Sweden | (Sweden) Ulf Granberg (Sweden) Christer Simonssen (New Zealand) Ian Tulloch | Ford Sierra RS500 | 6 | 10 |
| DNF | 1 | 20 | Holden Special Vehicles | (United Kingdom) Tom Walkinshaw (United Kingdom) Jeff Allam | Holden VL Commodore SS Group A SV | 5 | 13 |
| DNF | 1 | 15 | Peter Jackson Nissan Racing | (Australia) Glenn Seton (Sweden) Anders Olofsson | Nissan Skyline HR31 GTS-R | 0 | 17 |
| DNQ | 1 | 11 | Ray Gulson | (Australia) Ray Gulson (Australia) Graham Gulson | BMW 635 CSi | | |
| DNQ | 1 | 47 | Craig Kinmoth | (Australia) Alf Grant (Australia) Craig Kinmoth | Holden VK Commodore SS Group A | | |
| DNQ | 1 | 38 | Grellis Marketing | (Australia) Ray Ellis (Australia) Bruce Williams | Holden VL Commodore SS Group A | | |
| DNQ | 1 | 48 | Tony Kavich | (Australia) Tony Kavich (Australia) Ken Davison | Holden VL Commodore SS Group A | | |
| DNQ | 1 | 29 | The Xerox Shop | (Australia) Alan Taylor (Australia) Kevin Kennedy | Mitsubishi Starion Turbo | | |
| DNQ | 1 | 42 | Steve Williams | (Australia) Steve Williams (Australia) Chris Clearihan | Holden VK Commodore SS Group A | | |
| DNS | 1 | 40 | Holden Special Vehicles | (United Kingdom) Tom Walkinshaw (Australia) Larry Perkins | Holden VL Commodore SS Group A SV | | |

Italics indicate driver practiced in the car but did not race.

== Statistics ==
- Pole Position – #17 Dick Johnson – 2:16.46
- Fastest Lap – #25 Tony Longhurst – 2:19.06 – Lap 4 (new lap record)
- Race time of winning car - 7:02:10.28
- Average Speed – 142.16 km/h

== See also ==
- 1988 Australian Touring Car season
