= Brian Sampson =

Brian Sampson may refer to:

- Brian Sampson (cricketer) (1945–2026), New Zealand cricketer
- Brian Sampson (footballer) (born 1941), former Australian rules footballer
- Brian Sampson (racing driver) (1935–2023), winner of the 1975 Bathurst 1000
