= Dick Johnson (racing driver) =

Australian racing driver (born 1945)

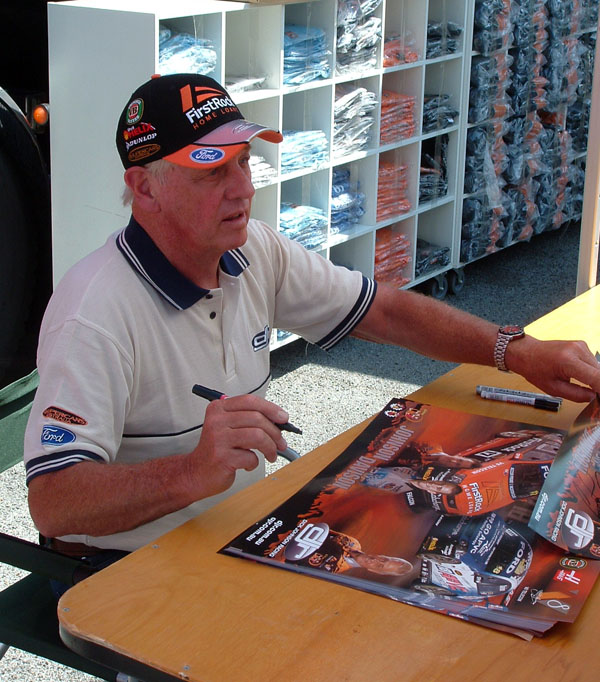
- Johnson signing autographs in 2006
- Nationality: Australian
- Born: Richard Johnson; 26 April 1945 (age 81) Brisbane, Queensland, Australia
- Retired: 1999
- Relatives: Steven Johnson (son); Jett Johnson (grandson)

Australian Touring Car Championship
- Years active: 1970–1999
- Teams: Bryan Byrt Racing; Dick Johnson Racing
- Starts: 202
- Wins: 22
- Best finish: 1st in 1981, 1982, 1984, 1988 & 1989 Australian Touring Car Championship

Previous series
- 1982–91 1989–90 1990: Australian Endurance Championship; NASCAR Australia; NASCAR Cup Series

Championship titles
- 1981 1981 1982 1984 1987 1988 1989 1989 1994 1994 1995 1995: Australian Touring Car Champ. Bathurst 1000; Australian Touring Car Champ. Australian Touring Car Champ. South Pacific Touring Car Championship; Australian Touring Car Champ. Australian Touring Car Champ. Bathurst 1000; Sandown 500; Bathurst 1000; Eastern Creek 12 Hour; Sandown 500

Awards
- 2001: V8 Supercars Hall of Fame

Richard Johnson (born 26 April 1945) is a part-owner of the V8 Supercar team Dick Johnson Racing and a former racing driver. As a driver, he was a five-time Australian Touring Car Champion and a three-time winner of the Bathurst 1000. As of 2008, Johnson has claimed over twenty awards and honours, including the V8 Supercars Hall of Fame into which he was inducted in 2001.

In 2009 as part of the Q150 celebrations, Johnson was announced as one of the Q150 Icons of Queensland for his role as a "sports legend".

== Early life ==
As a teen, Johnson attended Cavendish Road State High School in Brisbane, Australia and it was in this area of Coorparoo that he first started driving with his father as a young child. Cavendish Road State High School has named one of their school houses Johnson, in his honour. The house colour is blue.

After leaving school, Johnson was drafted into the Australian Army at the age of twenty and began his two-year National Service in 1965. Although they did not know each other at the time, both Johnson and future touring car rival Peter Brock were stationed together at the Blamey Barracks near Wagga Wagga in New South Wales from 1965 to 1967.

== Racing ==
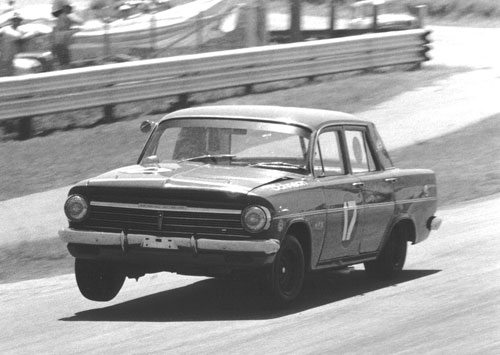
Dick Johnson in the Holden EH at Lakeside in November 1969

Despite becoming synonymous with driving Fords, Johnson raced in his early days in a succession of Holdens. Johnson's first race car was a Holden FJ, his first race being at Lakeside International Raceway in November 1964. In 1968 and 1969 he raced his Holden EH and from there progressed to a Holden Torana GTR for 1970, scoring his first Australian Touring Car Championship points at Lakeside in that year. The GTR was upgraded to XU-1 specifications in 1971. Johnson's first drive in the Hardie Ferodo 1000 was in Bob Forbes' Holden LJ Torana GTR XU-1 in 1973 when they placed fifth. Johnson then had a single race for the Holden Dealer Team at the Surfers Paradise round of the 1974 ATCC where he finished third driving a GTR XU-1. He later purchased the ex HDT Torana in which Peter Brock had won the Bathurst 1000 in 1972 from Barrie Nixon Smith and campaigned the car until his switch to Ford in 1977. The Torana was sold to Kerry Cox who raced it in the QLD Touring car championship in a close rivalry with Johnson, with Cox winning in 1977 and Dick getting the title in 1978.

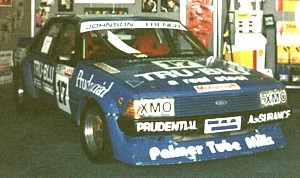
1981 Tru-Blu Ford Falcon

In 1980, during the Bathurst 1000 he started second and led for the first seventeen laps before his car was spun off the track after hitting a football-sized rock that had been, according to an eye-witness in 2012, accidentally kicked onto the track by one of a pair of inebriated men. The resulting public support where people from around Australia rang their local Channel 7 television station (the race broadcaster) and pledged money to help the team get back on its feet. Eventually the sum of A$72,000 was donated to help rebuild the car. Led by its CEO Edsel Ford II who saw the value of the goodwill in the press surrounding Johnson's crash, the Ford Motor Company of Australia provided a new car shell and promised to match the donation dollar for dollar, resulting in the team receiving $144,000 to help get back into racing.

Johnson's close friend Ross Palmer, the owner of Palmer Tube Mills of Brisbane, became his primary sponsor in 1981 (with Bryan Byrt Ford also still a major sponsor), and with the donated money allowed him to return the next year to win both the Australian Touring Car Championship (ATCC) and the Bathurst 1000 (with John French). Johnson won the ATCC in a famous race-long duel with Peter Brock at the Lakeside International Raceway round. He won the ATCC again in 1982 (the Tru Blu XD Falcon), 1984 (Greens Tuff XE Falcon), 1988 (Ford Sierra RS500) and 1989 (Sierra RS500). He also won Bathurst in 1989 (in a Ford Sierra with John Bowe) and 1994 (in an EB Falcon, also with Bowe). The names Tru Blu, and Greens Tuff, as well as Red Roo (seen in late 1982 only), were product names of Palmer Tube Mills.

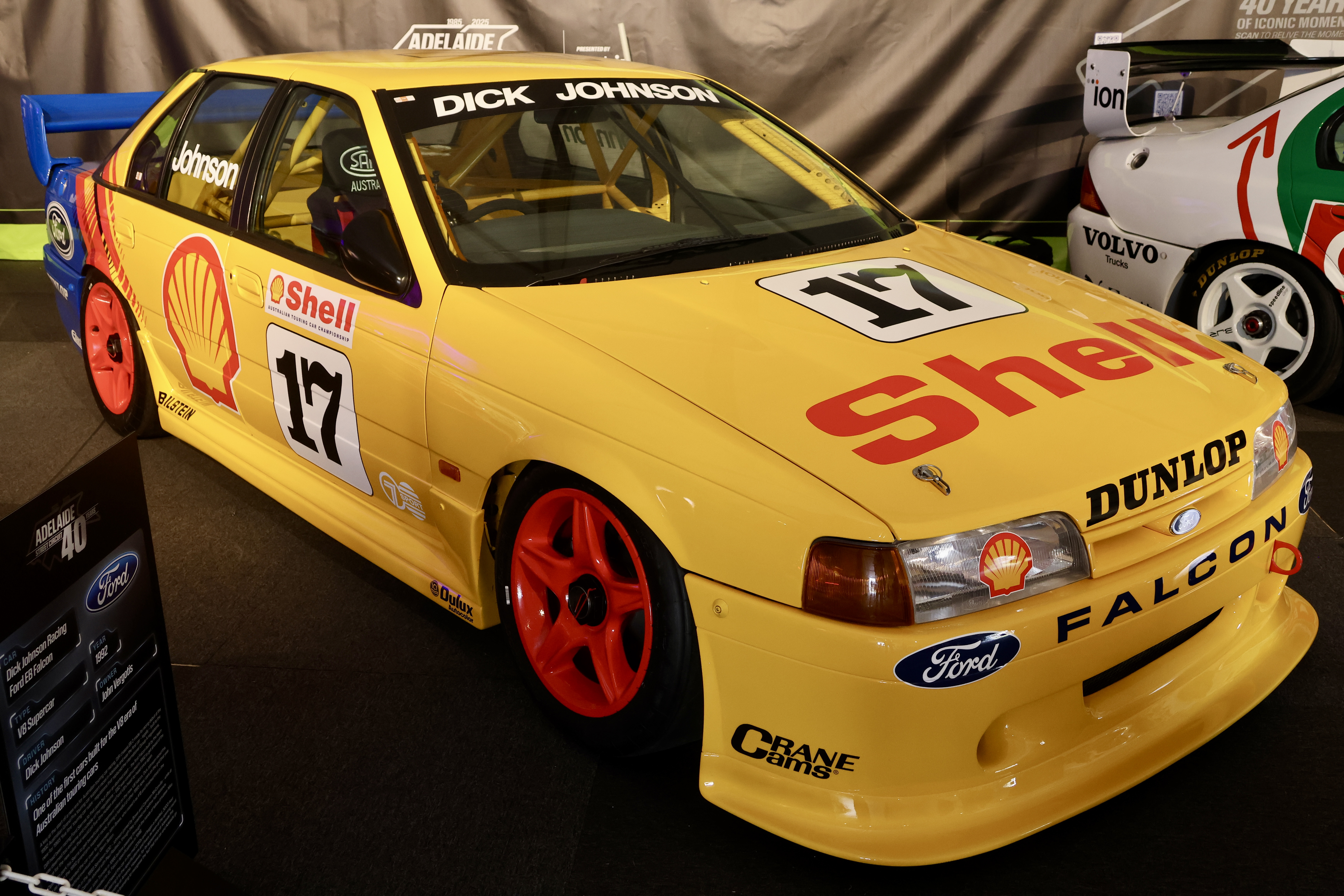
Ford Falcon (EB) of Johnson on display at the 2025 Adelaide Grand Final

With much larger budgets required in the racing industry, Ross Palmer helped negotiate for Shell to be the team's primary sponsor from 1987. The larger budget allowed the team to expand from just one car for Johnson, to a second Ford Sierra RS Cosworth for his then teammate Gregg Hansford.

== NASCAR ==
In 1989 and 1990, prompted by Palmer Tube Mills who assisted him in receiving multiple sources of sponsorship and through the company's American offshoot Redkote, Johnson made a brief foray into the NASCAR Winston Cup Series driving a Ford Thunderbird, entering a total of seven races with a best start of eleventh at Sears Point Raceway in his first race, and a best finish of 22nd at Pocono Raceway. Johnson also drove a Thunderbird in the first NASCAR race held in Australia, the 1988 Goodyear NASCAR 500 at the Calder Park Thunderdome in Melbourne. Unfortunately for Johnson, he was involved in an early race crash which put him out of the event. Johnson's head strategist and pit crew chief was future NASCAR Hall of Fame honoree Ray Evernham; his work with a Ford team would later catch the eye of then-Ford driver Jeff Gordon, forming one of the dominant driver/crew chief combinations of the 1990s. Johnson also competed in the 1988 NASCAR Christmas 500 at Calder Park, finishing fourteenth.

== Retirement ==
Johnson retired from racing at the end of the 1999 season, though he remains in charge of DJR. He did however make a one-off final appearance in front of his home crowd at the Queensland 500 in 2000 with his son Steven who had taken over driving Dick's famous Number 17 and continued to for over a decade after. Johnson has twice written his autobiography as well as contributing to a third biography.

In 2014, DJR announced that 51% of the team was sold to legendary team owner Roger Penske establishing DJR-Team Penske, which fields two cars in V8 Supercar racing. In 2019, Scott McLaughlin and Alexandre Prémat scored Johnson his first Bathurst 1000 win in any capacity since 1994. Penske later sold his share in the team back to Johnson at the end of the 2020 Supercars Championship and the team reverted to Dick Johnson Racing.

== Racecam ==
Johnson's laconic nature and quick wit were put to good use by longtime Bathurst 1000 TV broadcaster Channel 7 when they first put one of their racecam units in his Tru-Blu Ford Falcon for the 1982 James Hardie 1000. Johnson and co-driver John French were also wired for sound so the commentary team could talk to the drivers while racing around the track. From then on Johnson's cars were rarely without a TV camera sitting where the passenger seat usually was, especially when Seven was televising the race. His laconic commentary and a seemingly endless list of one-liners quickly became a favourite with Australian race fans, even those who normally followed Holden drivers such as Peter Brock and Allan Grice, both of whom also became exponents of using racecam.

Some of Johnson's quotes while on racecam were:

- "I've got one black BMW in front of me, one behind me. Frank Gardner and his All Blacks" – 1985 ATCC, Round 5 at the Adelaide International Raceway while he was sandwiched between the black JPS Team BMW's of New Zealanders Jim Richards and Neville Crichton. Gardner was the JPS team manager.
- "The old Volvo must have its truck suspension in" – 1986 ATCC, Round 4 at Adelaide International. Ironically Robbie Francevic's Volvo emerged as the race winner.
- "This race is like the Irishman who won the Tour de France I tell ya. He had to go on a lap of honour" – 1986 James Hardie 1000
- "This is where I lose so much time. I mean, this part of the track is just so boring" – 1986 Bathurst referring to his V8 Ford Mustang's lack of grunt compared to his competitors on the run up Mountain Straight.
- "It's missing and carrying on like an old sheila" – 1988 ATCC, Grand Finale at Oran Park Raceway after turbo boost problems with his championship winning Ford Sierra RS500 saw him relinquish the lead mid-race to teammate John Bowe. With the opposition nowhere in sight, Bowe later slowed enough to allow Dick to win the race and followed him across the line in a 1–2 form finish.
- "Winton? Its like running a marathon around your clothesline" – 1990 ATCC, Round 4 at Winton after Channel 7 commentator Mike Raymond asked him what the definition of Winton was.
- "Then Brock got past me would you believe, unfortunately, and that thing of his like, I nearly choked to death on Mobil 1. It looks like the last train to Ferny Grove" – 1990 ATCC, Grand Finale at Oran Park after problems with the Sierra saw him drop out of race winning and championship contention. He was referring to the Peter Brock Sierra's habit of belching black oil smoke out of its exhaust whenever he lifted off the accelerator.
- "The Sierra on one cylinder has got as much grunt as the Commodore" – 1991 ATCC, Round 5 at Winton after his misfiring Sierra had been passed by the V8 Holden Commodore of Larry Perkins.
- "You've got to be joking" – 1995 ATCC, Round 3 at Bathurst. Channel 7 had just crossed to Johnson with Mike Raymond asking "Are you lonely?". Johnson's quote came just seconds before he spun his Ford EF Falcon into Caltex Chase, seemingly distracted by Raymond's interruption. However, as the TV cameras soon picked up, the rear wing of the Falcon had collapsed at over 280 km/h (174 mph) as he was turning into the fastest corner on any Australian race circuit, at the same moment that Seven crossed to talk to him.

== Career results ==
Season	Series	Position	Car	Team
1970	Australian Touring Car Championship	16th	Holden LC Torana GTR	
1971	Australian Touring Car Championship	13th	Holden LC Torana GTR XU-1	
1972	Australian Touring Car Championship	7th	Holden LJ Torana GTR XU-1	Dick Johnson
1973	Australian Touring Car Championship	42nd	Holden LJ Torana GTR XU-1	Holden Dealer Team
1974	Australian Touring Car Championship	13th	Holden LJ Torana GTR XU-1	
1975	Australian Touring Car Championship	23rd	Holden LJ Torana GTR XU-1	
1976	Australian Touring Car Championship	28th	Holden LJ Torana GTR XU-1	
1977	Australian Touring Car Championship	22nd	Ford XB Falcon GT	Bryan Byrt Ford
1977	Australian Sports Sedan Championship	10th	Ford XB Falcon GT	Dick Johnson
1978	Australian Touring Car Championship	10th	Ford XC Falcon GS500	Bryan Byrt Ford
1979	Australian Touring Car Championship	29th	Ford XC Falcon Cobra	Bryan Byrt Ford
1981	Australian Touring Car Championship	1st	Ford XD Falcon	Palmer Tube Mills
1982	Australian Touring Car Championship	1st	Ford XD Falcon	Palmer Tube Mills
1982	Australian Endurance Championship	6th	Ford XE Falcon	Palmer Tube Mills
1983	Australian Touring Car Championship	6th	Ford XE Falcon	Palmer Tube Mills
1983	Better Brakes AMSCAR Series	11th	Ford XE Falcon	Palmer Tube Mills
1983	Australian Endurance Championship	11th	Ford XE Falcon	Palmer Tube Mills
1984	Australian Touring Car Championship	1st	Ford XE Falcon	Palmer Tube Mills
1984	Australian Endurance Championship	NC	Ford XE Falcon	Palmer Tube Mills
1984	World Sportscar Championship	NC	Chevrolet Monza	Re-Car Racing
1985	Australian Touring Car Championship	2nd	Ford Mustang GT	Palmer Tube Mills
1985	Australian Endurance Championship	8th	Ford Mustang GT	Palmer Tube Mills
1986	Australian Touring Car Championship	6th	Ford Mustang GT	Palmer Tube Mills
1986	Australian Endurance Championship	14th	Ford Mustang GT	Palmer Tube Mills
1987	Australian Touring Car Championship	6th	Ford Sierra RS Cosworth	Shell Ultra Hi-Tech Racing Team
1988	Australian Touring Car Championship	1st	Ford Sierra RS500	Shell Ultra Hi Racing
1988	European Touring Car Championship	NC	Ford Sierra RS500	Redkote Racing
1988	Asia-Pacific Touring Car Championship	NC	Ford Sierra RS500	Shell Ultra Hi Racing
1988	World Sportscar Championship	NC	Veskanda Chevrolet	Bernie van Elsen
1989	Australian Touring Car Championship	1st	Ford Sierra RS500	Shell Ultra Hi Racing
1989	NASCAR Cup Series	47th	Ford Thunderbird	Dick Johnson Racing
1990	Australian Touring Car Championship	4th	Ford Sierra RS500	Shell Ultra Hi Racing
1990	NASCAR Winston Cup Series	63rd	Ford Thunderbird	Dick Johnson Racing
1990	Australian Endurance Championship	NC	Ford Sierra RS500	Shell Ultra Hi Racing
1991	Australian Touring Car Championship	8th	Ford Sierra RS500	Shell Ultra Hi Racing
1991	Australian Endurance Championship	NC	Ford Sierra RS500	Shell Ultra Hi Racing
1992	Australian Touring Car Championship	8th	Ford Sierra RS500	Shell Ultra Hi Racing
1993	Australian Touring Car Championship	5th	Ford EB Falcon	Shell Racing
1994	Australian Touring Car Championship	8th	Ford EB Falcon	Shell FAI Racing
1995	Australian Touring Car Championship	7th	Ford EF Falcon	Shell FAI Racing
1995	Australian GT Production Car Series	12th	Mazda RX-7 SP	
1996	Australian Touring Car Championship	10th	Ford EF Falcon	Shell FAI Racing
1996	Mobil New Zealand Sprints	5th	Ford EF Falcon	Shell FAI Racing
1997	Australian Touring Car Championship	7th	Ford EL Falcon	Shell Helix Racing
1998	Australian Touring Car Championship	10th	Ford EL Falcon	Shell Helix Racing
1999	V8 Supercar Championship Series	10th	Ford AU Falcon	Shell Helix Racing

=== Complete Australian Touring Car Championship results ===
(key) (Races in bold indicate pole position) (Races in italics indicate fastest lap)

Year	Team	Car	1	2	3	4	5	6	7	8	9	10	11	12	13	14	15	16	17	18	DC	Points
1970	D. Johnson	Holden LC Torana GTR	CAL; R1	BAT; R2; 15	SAN; R3	MAL; R4	WAR; R5	LAK; R6; 6	SYM; R7												16th	1
1971	D. Johnson	Holden LC Torana GTR	SYM; R1	CAL; R2	SAN; R3	SUR; R4; 7	MAL; R5	LAK; R6; 8	ORA; R7; 6												13th	1
1972	Dick Johnson	Holden LJ Torana GTR XU-1	SYM	CAL	BAT	SAN	AIR	WAR; 3	SUR; 3	ORA; 4											7th	16
1973	Dick Johnson	Holden LJ Torana GTR XU-1	SYM	CAL	SAN	WAN	SUR; 6	AIR	ORA	WAR											42nd	1
1974	Zupps Holden Dealer Team	Holden LJ Torana GTR XU-1	SYM	CAL	SAN	AMA	ORA	SUR; 3	AIR												13th	6
1975	Dick Johnson	Holden LJ Torana GTR XU-1	SYM	CAL	AMA	ORA	SUR; 5	AIR	LAK; Ret												23rd	2
1976	Dick Johnson	Holden LJ Torana GTR XU-1	SYM	CAL	ORA	ORA	SAN	AMA	AMA	AIR	AIR	LAK; 5	LAK; 4	SAN	AIR	SUR; Ret	PHI				28th	4
1977	Bryan Byrt Ford	Ford XB Falcon GT Hardtop	SYM; 8	SYM; Ret	CAL	ORA; Ret	AMA	SAN; 5	AIR	**LAK**; **Ret**	SAN; Ret	AIR	SUR; 4	PHI							22nd	7
1978	Bryan Byrt Ford	Ford XC Falcon GS500 Hardtop	SYM	ORA; 3	AMA; Ret	SAN	WAN	WAN	CAL; 2	LAK; DSQ	AIR										10th	15
1979	Bryan Byrt Ford	Ford XC Falcon Cobra	SYM	CAL	ORA	ORA	SAN	WAN	SUR; 5	LAK; 7	AIR										27th	2
1981	Palmer Tube Mills	Ford XD Falcon	**SYM**; **1**	**CAL**; **1**	CAL; 10	ORA; 1	SAN; 1	SAN; 1	WAN; 2	AIR; 13	AIR; 1	SUR; 1	**LAK**; **1**								1st	83
1982	Palmer Tube Mills	Ford XD Falcon	SAN; 1	CAL; 1	SYM; 2	ORA; Ret	LAK; 2	WAN; Ret	AIR; 1	SUR; Ret											1st	57
1983	Palmer Tube Mills	Ford XE Falcon	CAL; Ret	SAN; 3	SYM; 5	WAN; 3	AIR; 5	SUR; Ret	ORA; Ret	LAK; Ret											6th	70
1984	Palmer Tube Mills	Ford XE Falcon	SAN; 2	SYM; 2	WAN; 3	SUR; 1	ORA; 3	LAK; 2	AIR; 3												1st	134
1985	Palmer Tube Mills	Ford Mustang GT	WIN; Ret	SAN; 3	SYM; 2	WAN; 3	AIR; 3	CAL; 2	SUR; 4	LAK; 2	AMA; 2	ORA; 2									2nd	192
1986	Palmer Tube Mills	Ford Mustang GT	AMA; 4	SYM; 5	SAN; Ret	AIR; 6	WAN; 5	SUR; 10	CAL; 8	LAK; 7	WIN; 8	ORA; 7									6th	110
1987	Shell Ultra Hi-Tech Racing Team	Ford Sierra RS Cosworth	CAL; 9	SYM; 9	LAK; DSQ	WAN; 2	AIR; 1	SUR; Ret	SAN; Ret	AMA; Ret	ORA; 3										6th	72
1988	Shell Ultra Hi-Tech Racing	Ford Sierra RS Cosworth	CAL; 1	SYM; 1	WIN; Ret	WAN; 1	AIR; 1	LAK; 2	SAN; 1	AMA; 2	ORA; 1										1st	150
1989	Shell Ultra Hi-Tech Racing	Ford Sierra RS Cosworth	AMA; 4	SYM; 1	LAK; 1	WAN; 3	MAL; 1	SAN; 1	WIN; 7	ORA; 2											1st	107
1990	Shell Ultra Hi-Tech Racing	Ford Sierra RS Cosworth	AMA; 3	SYM; 1	PHI; 1	WIN; 5	LAK; 7	MAL; 2	BAR; Ret	ORA; 7											3rd	83
1991	Shell Ultra Hi-Tech Racing	Ford Sierra RS Cosworth	SAN; R1; 4	SYM; R2; 5	WAN; R3; Ret	LAK; R4; 9	WIN; R5; 11	AMA; R6; 7	MAL; R7; 8	LAK; R8; Ret	ORA; R9; 11										9th	27
1992	Shell Ultra Hi-Tech Racing	Ford Sierra RS Cosworth	AMA; R1; 5	AMA; R2; 12	SAN; R3; 2	SAN; R4; 15	SYM; R5; 2	SYM; R6; 10	WIN; R7; 8	WIN; R8; 13	LAK; R9; Ret	LAK; R10; 6	**EAS**; **R11**; **11**	EAS; R12; 15	MAL; R13; 8	MAL; R14; 5	BAR; R15; 2	BAR; R16; 10	ORA; R17; 9	ORA; R18; 10	8th	134
1993	Shell Racing	Ford EB Falcon	AMA; R1; 1	AMA; R2; Ret	SYM; R3; 4	SYM; R4; 4	**PHI**; **R5**; **3**	PHI; R6; 4	LAK; R7; 1	**LAK**; **R8**; **2**	**WIN**; **R9**; **7**	WIN; R10; 6	EAS; R11; DNS	EAS; R12; 12	MAL; R13; 4	MAL; R14; 14	BAR; R15; 10	BAR; R16; 8	ORA; R17; 12	ORA; R18; 9	5th	93

=== Complete World Touring Car Championship results ===
(key) (Races in bold indicate pole position) (Races in italics indicate fastest lap)

Year	Team	Car	1	2	3	4	5	6	7	8	9	10	11	DC	Points
1987	(Australia) Shell Ultra Hi-Tech Racing Team	Ford Sierra RS500	MNZ	JAR	DIJ	NUR	SPA	BNO	SIL	BAT; Ret	CLD ovr:13 cls:9	WEL; Ret	FJI	NC	0

† Not registered for series & points

=== Complete World Sportscar Championship results ===
(key) (Races in bold indicate pole position) (Races in italics indicate fastest lap)

Year	Team	Car	1	2	3	4	5	6	7	8	9	10	11	DC	Points
1984	(Australia) Re-Car Racing	Chevrolet Monza	MON	SIL	LMS	NUR	BHT	MOS	SPA	IMO	FJI	KYL	SAN; DSQ	NC	0
1988	(Australia) Bernie van Elsen	Veskanda C1 Chevrolet	JRZ	JAR	MON	SIL	LMS	BRN	BHT	NUR	SPA	FJI	SAN; DSQ	NC	0

=== Complete European Touring Car Championship results ===
(key) (Races in bold indicate pole position) (Races in italics indicate fastest lap)

Year	Team	Car	1	2	3	4	5	6	7	8	9	10	11	DC	Points
1988	(Australia) Redkote Racing	Ford Sierra RS500	MNZ	DON	EST	JAR	DIJ	VAL	NUR	SPA	ZOL	**SIL**; 21	NOG	NC	0

=== Complete Asia-Pacific Touring Car Championship results ===
(key) (Races in bold indicate pole position) (Races in italics indicate fastest lap)

Year	Team	Car	1	2	3	4	DC	Points
1988	(Australia) Shell Ultra Hi Racing	Ford Sierra RS500	BAT; 2	WEL; Ret	PUK	FJI	N/A	15

=== NASCAR ===
(key) (Bold – Pole position awarded by qualifying time. Italics – Pole position earned by points standings or practice time. * – Most laps led.)

==== Winston Cup Series ====
NASCAR Winston Cup Series results
Year	Team	No.	Make	1	2	3	4	5	6	7	8	9	10	11	12	13	14	15	16	17	18	19	20	21	22	23	24	25	26	27	28	29	NWCC	Pts	Ref
1989	Dick Johnson Racing	38	Ford	DAY	CAR	ATL	RCH	DAR	BRI	NWS	MAR	TAL	CLT	DOV	SON; 32	POC	MCH	DAY	POC; 22	TAL; 24	GLN; 32	MCH; DNQ	BRI	DAR	RCH	DOV	MAR	CLT	NWS	CAR	PHO	ATL	47th	322	
1990	Dick Johnson Racing	38	Ford	DAY	RCH	CAR	ATL	DAR; 34	BRI	NWS	MAR	TAL	CLT; DNQ	DOV	SON	POC	MCH	DAY	POC; 39	TAL	GLN; 27	MCH	BRI	DAR	RCH	DOV	MAR	NWS	CLT	CAR	PHO	ATL	63rd	189	

=== Complete Bathurst 1000 results ===
Year	Team	Co-drivers	Car	Class	Laps	Pos.	Class pos.
1973		(Australia) Bob Forbes	Holden LJ Torana GTR XU-1	D	154	5th	5th
1974	(Australia) John French Pty Ltd	(Australia) John French	Alfa Romeo 2000 GTV	1301 – 2000cc	71	DNF	DNF
1976	(Australia) Bryan Byrt Ford	(Australia) Graham Moore	Ford Capri Mk.I RS3100	2001cc - 3000cc	154	10th	2nd
1977	(Australia) Bryan Byrt Ford	(Australia) Vern Schuppan	Ford XB Falcon GT Hardtop	3001cc – 6000cc	124	DNF	DNF
1978	(Australia) Bryan Byrt Ford	(Australia) Vern Schuppan	Ford XC Falcon GS500 Hardtop	A	153	5th	5th
1979	(Australia) Bryan Byrt Ford	(Australia) Gary Scott	Ford XC Falcon GS500 Hardtop	A	24	DNF	DNF
1980	(Australia) Palmer Tube Mills	(Australia) John French	Ford XD Falcon	3001-6000cc	17	DNF	DNF
1981	(Australia) Palmer Tube Mills	(Australia) John French	Ford XD Falcon	8 Cylinder & Over	120	1st	1st
1982	(Australia) Palmer Tube Mills	(Australia) John French	Ford XE Falcon	A	160	DSQ	DSQ
1983	(Australia) Palmer Tube Mills	(Australia) Kevin Bartlett	Ford XE Falcon	A	61	DNF	DNF
1984	(Australia) Palmer Tube Mills	(Australia) John French	Ford XE Falcon	Group C	107	DNF	DNF
1984	(Australia) Palmer Tube Mills	(Australia) John French	Ford Mustang GT	Group A	-	DNS	DNS
1985	(Australia) Palmer Tube Mills	(Australia) Larry Perkins	Ford Mustang GT	C	159	7th	7th
1985	(Australia) Palmer Tube Mills	(Australia) Larry Perkins	Ford Mustang GT	C	-	DNS	DNS
1986	(Australia) Palmer Tube Mills	(Australia) Gregg Hansford	Ford Mustang GT	C	162	4th	3rd
1987	(Australia) Shell Ultra Hi-Tech Racing Team	(Australia) Gregg Hansford	Ford Sierra RS500	1	3	DNF	DNF
1988	(Australia) Shell Ultra Hi-Tech Racing	(Australia) John Bowe	Ford Sierra RS500	A	22	DNF	DNF
1988	(Australia) Shell Ultra Hi-Tech Racing	(Australia) John Smith (Australia) John Bowe (Australia) Alfredo Costanzo	Ford Sierra RS500	A	160	2nd	2nd
1989	(Australia) Shell Ultra Hi-Tech Racing	(Australia) John Bowe	Ford Sierra RS500	A	161	1st	1st
1990	(Australia) Shell Ultra Hi-Tech Racing	(Australia) John Bowe	Ford Sierra RS500	A	94	DNF	DNF
1991	(Australia) Shell Ultra Hi-Tech Racing	(Australia) John Bowe	Ford Sierra RS500	1	123	DNF	DNF
1992	(Australia) Shell Ultra Hi-Tech Racing	(Australia) John Bowe	Ford Sierra RS500	A	143	2nd	2nd
1993	(Australia) Shell Racing	(Australia) John Bowe	Ford EB Falcon	A	96	DNF	DNF
1994	(Australia) Shell FAI Racing	(Australia) John Bowe	Ford EB Falcon	A	161	1st	1st
1995	(Australia) Shell FAI Racing	(Australia) John Bowe	Ford EF Falcon		110	DNF	DNF
1996	(Australia) Shell FAI Racing	(Australia) John Bowe	Ford EF Falcon		161	2nd	2nd
1997	(Australia) Dick Johnson Racing	(Australia) John Bowe	Ford EL Falcon	L1	17	DNF	DNF
1998	(Australia) Dick Johnson Racing	(Australia) Steven Johnson	Ford EL Falcon	OC	60	DNF	DNF
1999	(Australia) Dick Johnson Racing	(Australia) Steven Johnson	Ford AU Falcon		161	4th	4th

Sporting positions
Preceded by Peter Brock; Jim Richards	Winner of the Bathurst 1000; 1981 (with John French)	Succeeded by Peter Brock; Larry Perkins
Preceded by Peter Brock	Winner of the Australian Touring Car Championship; 1981 & 1982	Succeeded by Allan Moffat
Preceded by Allan Moffat	Winner of the Australian Touring Car Championship; 1984	Succeeded by Jim Richards
Preceded by Jim Richards	Winner of the Australian Touring Car Championship; 1988 & 1989	Succeeded by Jim Richards
Preceded by Tony Longhurst; Tomas Mezera	Winner of the Bathurst 1000; 1989 (with John Bowe)	Succeeded by Allan Grice; Win Percy
Preceded by Larry Perkins; Gregg Hansford	Winner of the Bathurst 1000; 1994 (with John Bowe)	Succeeded by Larry Perkins; Russell Ingall
Preceded by Gregg Hansford; Neil Crompton	Winner of the Eastern Creek 12 Hour; 1995 (with John Bowe)	Succeeded by Craig Baird; Paul Morris; Garry Holt
