= RaceCam =

Video camera system used in motor racing

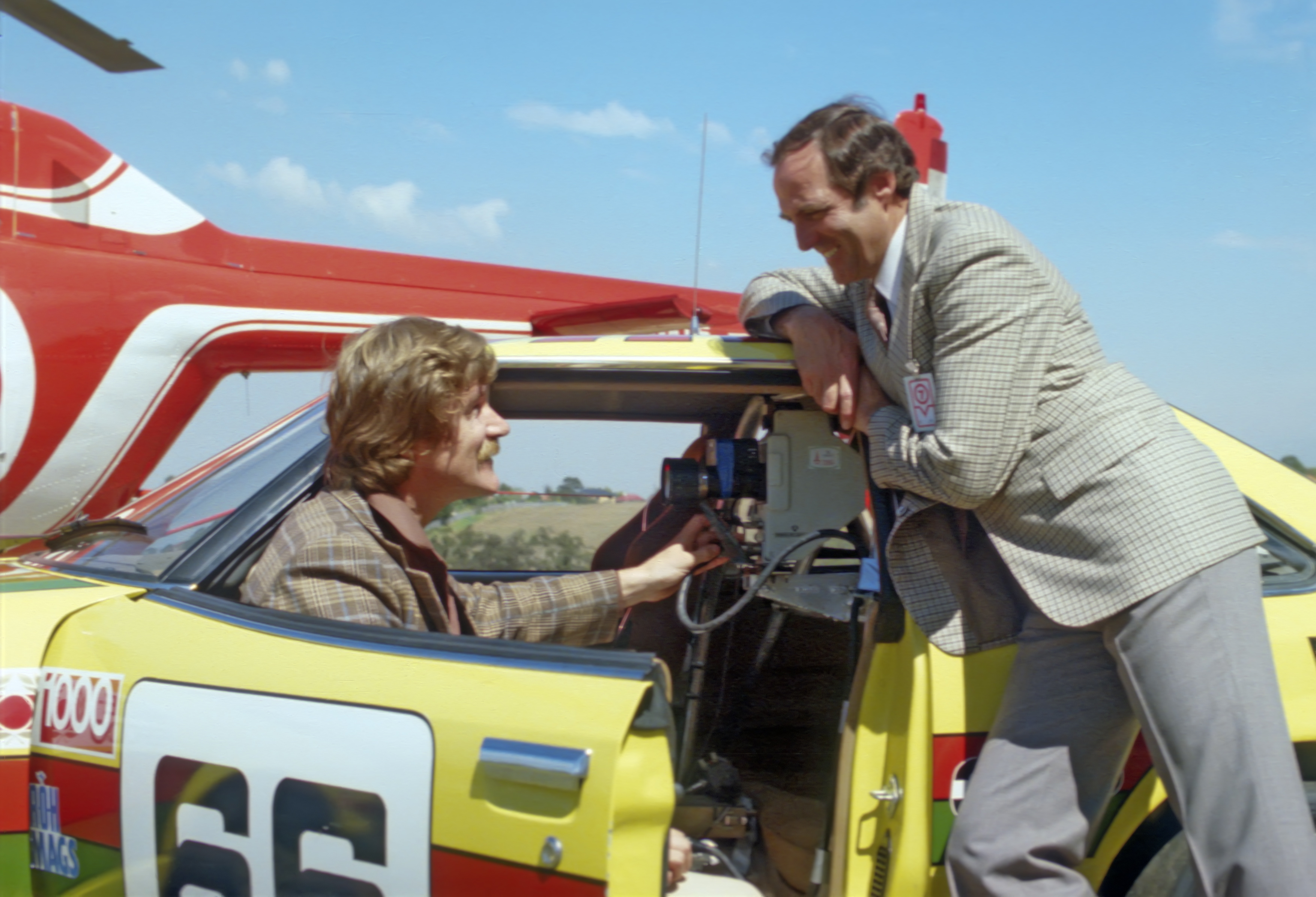
Seven Network Sydney engineer John Porter with race car driver Peter Williamson and the Racecam camera system Porter's team developed. The Bell JetRanger in the background provided a microwave link between tracking stations positioned around the racetrack and the race car

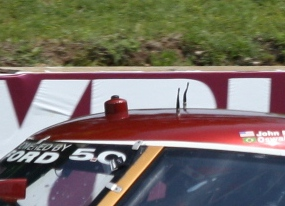
RaceCam installed in a Daytona Prototype

RaceCam is a video camera system used primarily in motor racing, which uses a network of car-mounted cameras, microwave radio transmitters, and relays from helicopters to send live images from inside a race car to both pit crews and television audiences.

== History ==
Although a vehicle-mounted 16mm motion picture camera was used as early as 1973, this technology was first developed in the late 1970s by the Seven Network in Australia, who introduced it for the 1979 Hardie-Ferodo 1000 endurance race at Mount Panorama in Bathurst, New South Wales with driver Peter Williamson able to give commentary from his Toyota Celica.

American audiences were first introduced to RaceCam through broadcaster CBS at NASCAR's 1981 Daytona 500 with Terry Labonte's Buick Regal, and later at the 1983 Indianapolis 500, when ABC acquired the rights to use a streamlined version of the technology for their coverage of the race.

Over the years, RaceCam was refined and led to further developments. Besides the natural upgrades for high-definition television, the "Bumpercam" uses a camera mounted on the car's bumper, and the "Roofcam" was mounted on a car's roof, giving a broader and more authentic perspective of the driver's sightlines. "Clearview" is another system, which removes grit and dust from the lens. In IndyCar, the camera location varied from "over-the-shoulder" in 1983, to rear-mounted (looking backwards) in 1988, nosecone-mounted in 1994, and rollbar/above-mounted in 1997. Later, the above-mounted cameras were improved to be able to rotate 360°. Other camera views have included the rear wing (just above the rear tyre), the gearbox, the driver's helmet ("Visor cam"), a "footcam" looking at the driver's feet (to illustrate the heel-and-toe shifting process in road racing), and a view from the sidepod. Additional mounting locations inside the cockpit gave a face view of the driver, but usually little or no view of the track. The "CrewCam" was another view, mounted on a pit crew member's hat or helmet, showing the point of view of a pit crew member performing his duties on pit road. In NASCAR, the large, boxy interior of the stock cars allowed modified, nearly regular-sized video cameras to be mounted in the cockpit, sometimes with a remote-controlled, 360° rotating camera.

RaceCam in Australia was unique in that the drivers were often wired for sound and able to converse with the television commentary team during races. In NASCAR, the drivers generally refused to be wired to talk to the television commentators while driving, claiming that it was too distracting.

Formula One has also incorporates similar technology, with each car featuring a distinctive streamlined "camera pod" mounted above each car's airbox, giving video from a perspective similar to the driver's point of view, while also allowing a rearward-facing view for cars trailing behind. FIA regulations mandate that a total of five cameras (or dummy camera housings) must be mounted on the car, in a choice of several predetermined positions.

In IndyCar, all cars in the field are equipped with multiple "camera pod" housing units - one each above the roll bar, one embedded within the front nosecone, one in the aeroscreen, and in previous season, one the rear wing, and inside one of the rear-view mirrors - regardless if they are actually carrying cameras in those locations. This rule is such that cars carrying cameras will not have an aerodynamic disadvantage (or advantage) compared to cars not carrying cameras. In addition, camera-less cars carry equivalent ballast in place of the cameras, to ensure all cars have equal weight characteristics.

In 2019, the FIA Formula E Championship developed a miniature camera titled "Driver's Eye", designed to fit within the padding of a drivers' helmet.
