= Jim Richards (racing driver) =

New Zealand racing driver (born 1947)

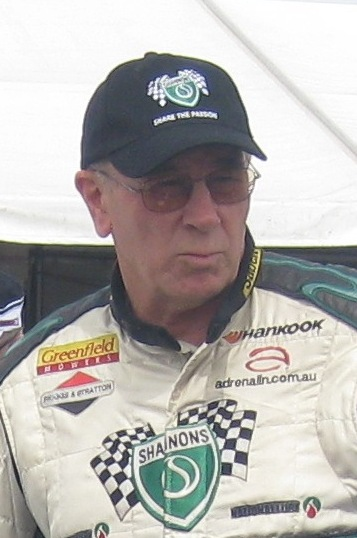
- Richards in 2011
- Nationality: New Zealander
- Born: James Charles Richards; 2 September 1947 (age 79) Ōtāhuhu, New Zealand
- Relatives: Steven Richards (son)

Touring Car Masters
- Years active: 2008–16
- Teams: Jim Richards Racing
- Car number: 2
- Best finish: 1st in 2010, 2013

Previous series
- 1976–1980 1977, 1980–1995 1994–1996, 1999 1995–1999 1996 1999–2006 2001–2003 2003–2006 2009: Australian Sports Sedan Ch. Australian Touring Car; Australian GT Production; Australian Super Touring; NASCAR Australia; V8 Supercar; Australian Nations Cup; Carrera Cup Australia; Australian GT

Championship titles
- 1985 1985 1986 1987 1990 1991 1995 1996 1999 2000 2001 2002 2003 2010 2013: Australian Touring Car; Australian Endurance Champ. Australian Endurance Champ. Australian Touring Car; Australian Touring Car; Australian Touring Car; Australian GT Production; NASCAR Australia; Australian GT Production; Australian Nations Cup; Australian Nations Cup; Australian Nations Cup; Carrera Cup Australia; Touring Car Masters; Touring Car Masters

Awards
- 2006: V8 Supercars Hall of Fame

James Charles Richards AM (born 2 September 1947) is a New Zealand racing driver who won numerous championships in his home country and in Australia. While now retired from professional racing, Richards continued to compete in the Touring Car Masters series until 2018.

Richards was inducted into the New Zealand Motor-racing Hall of Fame in 1994. After a record number of starts and seven victories in the Bathurst 1000, and four Australian Touring Car Championships, Richards was inducted into the V8 Supercars Hall of Fame in 2006 and the Australian Motorsport Hall of Fame in 2015. He is the father of racing driver Steven Richards, and between them they have achieved 12 Bathurst 1000 wins, most recently in 2018.

Richards was appointed an Honorary Member of the Order of Australia in the 2026 Australia Day Honours for "significant service to motor sports as a team owner and driver".

== Racing career (New Zealand) ==
Jim Richards grew up in South Auckland. He left school at 16 to start a mechanic's apprenticeship at Speedway Auto Services in Manurewa owned by Brian Yates, who was a top midget-racer in New Zealand. By then Richards had already been successful in junior go-karts in a kart made by his father. At 18 he bought his first car, on hire-purchase, a Ford Anglia 105E, a car known for mechanical reliability that he could get into racing and still drive to work. He was last in his first race, at Pukekohe, and crashed after the end of the race. Painted in distinctive red with yellow trim and the number '105', which became synonymous with his cars in NZ racing, he used the car for two seasons throughout the country, in race meetings, hill-climbs and rally-sprints. He then upgraded to a race-proven and more modified Anglia, his first proper racing-car.

In 1968, when working as a mechanic at Barry Pointon Motors, he bought one of the newly released 1300cc Mark I Ford Escorts. The car was underpowered but it further allowed Richards to improve his race-craft. In 1969 the patronage of amateur racer and fellow competitor, Jim Carney, allowed him to upgrade to his first truly competitive car, a Ford Escort with a new high-performance 1600cc BDA twin-cam engine, capable of 140 bhp. The combination of Richards as driver and mechanic Carney with the funding, and Murray Bunn with reconditioning and tuning expertise, started to produce a number of victories.

In 1970, Carney purchased the Ford Escort TC that Mike Crabtree had raced in that year's British Touring Car Championship for the John Willment Group and this car established Richards as a top racer. Rushed straight off the boat, still in its original livery, he won with it first time out and then went on to win the class championship that year, and again in the following 1971–72 season. By now in popular demand, he would often also race the Escort in the open-class as well, taking on and beating the V8 Mustangs, Camaros and Firebirds. He would also enter his tow-car, a Holden Monaro, in production races, as well as racing in the small class with a Hillman Imp owned by local driver Brian Patrick. It was the latter partnership that first got the sponsorship of the NZ division of Sidchrome – an Australian tool manufacturer – the major financial connection for the next decade.

During this time, as in neighbouring Australia, big-engine production car racing was entering a golden age and drawing big crowds. Competitive cars included, from Holden, the HQ Monaro, and new Torana GTR XU-1; versus the Ford Falcon GT-HO and Chrysler Charger. Richards initially raced a Monaro for major Auckland car-dealer (and his new employer) Jerry Clayton. In 1971 he was regularly battling with Robbie Francevic in the Team McMillan Ford Falcon GT-HO. In the next season's Castrol GTX Championship the two drivers swapped teams. Richards won the 72–73 championship in the Team McMillan GT-HO, with Murray Bunn still doing the engine-preparation. In the following season, his main competition would be from Neville Crichton in a 350 Monaro. For the 73–74 season, Richards and Carney had arranged to buy the John Fitzpatrick Ford Escort (with an 1800cc BDA engine) competing in the British championship to take on the big V8s. However, it was wrecked in one of the last races and the deal fell through. Instead, he and Murray Bunn set up building up a Ford Mustang at a remote farmstead out of Auckland. Sponsored by Sidchrome in red and yellow, it was fitted with the hitherto unreliable, but powerful, Cleveland 351 V8 engine and extra-wide rear tyres. Initially unsuccessful, after its teething troubles were resolved it was impressive enough to win Richards the 73–74 Saloon Car Championship. Changing jobs to work for Sidchrome gave Richards time during the week to work on the car during the next season. In an exciting and close 74–75 championship (including success in a Trans-Tasman series against some of Australia's best drivers), he was narrowly pipped for the championship by Paul Fahey in his ex-European works Ford Capri Cologne V6.

Richards was also having success in endurance racing. The traditional season opener in October was the Benson & Hedges 500 – a 500-mile / 6-hour race run into the night for stock-standard production cars. He won the event in both 1971 and 1972 co-driving with friend and racing rival, Rod Coppins, in a Chrysler Charger. When Coppins wanted to upgrade his choice of car for the 74–75 racing season he decided to pick up a new Holden Torana L34 from the factory in Melbourne. Together he and Jim took it to the 1974 Hardie-Ferodo 1000 for its first race. Racing regulations were moving closer to the Australian Group C rules at the time and marked the demise of the standard production-car racing. Driving a McMillan-Ford Falcon XA in the 74–75 GTX season Richards was unbeatable, winning an unprecedented 17 consecutive wins. His final two races were in the 1975 winter-season co-driving Neville Crichton's Chevrolet Camaro with a win in his last race in New Zealand for some time.

From early in his racing career, Richards had also tried rallying, as the schedules did not conflict with the track-racing season. One of the first formal racing rallies in New Zealand was the 1968 Shell Silver Fern Rally. Richards entered with Jim Carney as co-driver. In the following year's inaugural Heatway Rally, he drove a new Triumph 2.5 PI with Carney's wife, Mary, as co-driver. After being one of the leaders the gearbox broke, leaving him with only top gear and finishing down the field. Recognising his talent, for the following year's Heatway, Leyland-New Zealand offered him and Jim Carney a team Morris Marina alongside works driver Andrew Cowan. As expected the suspension was not strong enough and after initially running second behind Cowan he finished mid-field.

In 1973, the Heatway Rally attracted several of the works teams running in the inaugural World Rally Championship, although it was not itself a championship event. Ford offered him a ride as the third driver in their works team alongside rising star Hannu Mikkola and NZ champion Mike Marshall running Ford Escort RS1600s. Richards was running second to Mikkola going into the first mountain stage. Having never driven on ice before his car caught an icy patch in the middle of the night and slid wide off the road and rolled down a bank for 100 metres. He and co-driver Richard Halls were very lucky that they came to rest on a narrow outcrop before tumbling over a deeper gorge. They were hauled out at dawn, and with surprisingly little damage were able to resume the rally, albeit out of contention. Thereafter he was consistently quicker than Mikkola, who had a comfortable race-lead and had eased off. The rally ended with a tarmac stage at Pukekohe, where Richards was back on very familiar territory.

In the early '70s Richards had also had success doing guest spots on the speedway tracks. But at the end of the 1974–75 racing season, with the opposition getting more professional, he needed to make a choice on one form or motor-racing – racetrack, rallying or speedway – to concentrate on. The decision was made to move across to the more lucrative Australian racing scene.

== Racing career (Australia) ==
Richards first made his mark in Australia at the 1974 Hardie-Ferodo 1000 with a masterful display of wet weather driving during the race, recording lap times fifteen seconds faster than the leaders in the latter part of the event while driving a V8 Holden LH Torana SL/R 5000 with fellow Kiwi Rod Coppins. Driving with essentially standard showroom kit, by the end, their front brakes were gone, but through attrition finished a very credible third place, five laps behind the winner John Goss. This and other wet weather drives over his career gave Richards the reputation of being a 'rainmaster', and he was called the "web-footed Kiwi", Many Australians humorously attributed it to living in rainy New Zealand, though Richards himself believes it was more from the car control he learned early in his career doing dirt track speedway.

In mid-1975, Richards moved to Australia. With Sidchrome-NZ ending its sponsorship, a deal was arranged with the Australian parent company to pick up the sponsorship for a tilt at the Australian season. Arriving unannounced in Melbourne just days before the first round at Sandown in July, despite minimal preparation time, he won both races at the meet in pouring rain. After this sensational start, he was immediately a popular choice for race promoters to pay appearance money to bring the Kiwi Mustang to take on Australia's best. Originally intending to commute across from Auckland for the races, after two very successful months he made the decision to move to Melbourne with his wife and two young boys to pursue a professional racing career. Through 1975 from 30 starts, he achieved 27 podiums including 13 wins. For Bathurst he re-joined Rod Coppins in his Holden Torana, finishing ninth after gearbox issues.

1976 saw the inaugural Australian Sports Sedan Championship and many drivers upgraded their machinery. However, Richards stuck with the Sidchrome Mustang – now showing its age. Wins were less frequent, however, the late-season arrival of Frank Gardner's all-conquering Chevrolet Corvair helped to limit his opposition getting too many points. Allan Moffat won the series but Richards did get a big payday winning the $100 000 Marlboro sports sedan finals at Calder Park Raceway. In October he was co-driver for John Goss at Bathurst. He outmuscled the HDT polesitter to lead the race after the first corner, but a broken clutch soon stopped the challenge and they ended up finishing 29th. At the end of the year he was invited by Dick Johnson to drive his Torana XU1 in the Brisbane round of the Touring Car series, getting his first Touring Car victory.

With the Mustang now obsolete, and Sidchrome's sponsorship ended, Richards moved across to the Australian Touring Car Championship. Ford provided a Ford Falcon chassis to prepare. However, it proved difficult to get it competitive and as money dried up, the shell was successively leased mid-year to Goss and Johnson whose own cars had been wrecked in accidents. With sponsorship from Melbourne's Melford Motors, Richards debuted the Falcon in September at Sandown, and then onto October's Bathurst race as a privateer with Coppins now as his co-driver. Although fast, the engine proved fragile and unreliable. Suddenly though at the end of the season, after a change of ownership, Melford pulled its sponsorship.

Then in 1978, Richards began a successful stint at the Holden Dealer Team as Peter Brock's co-driver at Bathurst, netting Richards three Bathurst 1000 titles in a row. This was the first time a driver combination had done three-in-a-row at Bathurst. It changed the course of the race into a 6-hour sprint race where the co-driver now had to be as skilled and quick as the lead driver. Brock later recalled that, at the time, he only knew Richards as a casual acquaintance and fellow driver, but after the Wanneroo Park round of the 1978 Australian Touring Car Championship, the pair shared a Ford Falcon panel van for the drive from Perth back to Melbourne (which they allegedly covered in approximately 24 hours for what is normally a 2–3 day trip). Upon returning home to Melbourne, Brock suggested Richards for the job of his co-driver for that years Hardie-Ferodo 1000 at Bathurst. He was hired by HDT team manager John Shepherd, who knew Richards in Melbourne. Together, Brock and Richards drover the perfect, trouble-free race to win Bathurst in 1978 after starting from pole position.

The following year in 1979, the pair had an even more dominant win, with a record-breaking six-lap margin to their nearest rivals. Just after taking over the car Richards had to drive through treacherous conditions with half the track wet and half dry. He and Brock subsequently took the car back to New Zealand for the end-of-year summer series. For the 1980 race, Brock was now leader of the Holden Dealer Team, in the first year of the new Holden Commodore. Early on in the race, Brock made an uncharacteristic error colliding with a back-marker while lapping it. After a strong comeback drive Brock got back into the lead before handing over to Richards who then drove matching lap-times to take a hard-fought third win. "We didn't know what was going to happen, so we just had to go flat stick. Our times were virtually the same. I actually had the fastest lap of the race until Brockie went out in his last stint and knocked me off by a tenth of a second".

The Mustang was outclassed by the end of 1976 and Richards and Bunn had planned to replace it with the new Ford Falcon. However ongoing delays meant it did not makes its debut until the start of the 1978 season at Surfers Paradise in May. Allan Grice had bought the Corvair from Gardner who had retired. Richards and Grice battled all season, ending on equal points but Grice won the championship on a countback. The following year mechanical unreliability meant he finished a distant second to Grice's Corvair.

The late ’70s marked a decline in Australasian motorsports with most drivers stretched for finance. Richards took up a Bob Jane T-Mart's franchise in Preston, Melbourne to provide a regular income, and a degree of sponsorship. It was also during this time he tried racing in F5000 single-seaters as well as the Barclays TR7 Procar single-marque series.

In 1981, Richards bought the Falcon off Bob Jane but although competitive it was getting increasingly unreliable. With new GT regulations coming into force for 1982, it would be too expensive to make it eligible, so it was retired to his T-Mart's foyer while up for sale.

In February 1982, Richards was hired by Frank Gardner, team manager of the new JPS Team BMW, as the team's lead driver to drive the BMW 635 CSi. The team knew results under the locally developed Group C regulations would be very hard against the local Holdens and Fords, and never won a race from 1982 to 1984. Plans to switch to the more competitive M535is, with its far better power-to-weight ratio, were stymied because insufficient numbers had been manufactured by the company.

As Richards commented: "It was more or less known between Frank and I that if the car was good enough to win when I'm driving it well, then it would win. I always knew the preparation was perfect whether the car was coming tenth or first". "I wasn't disappointed, sorry for myself, because I don't when I don't win races. It was the guys I felt for, because the incredible amount of work you put in is the same whether you run first or last". It was a positive attitude matched by the BMW motorsport management and the sponsors that was prepared to wait for the results.

Meanwhile, the Sports Sedan series had been replaced by the GT championship, running to Group 5/IMSA GT rules. The JPS Team BMW entered a turbo-charged 318i for Richards. It was up against Porsche 935s, Holden LX Torana, and an Alfa Romeo Alfetta GTV amongst others. 1982 was a learning curve, ending with a surprise pole position in the final race. But going into the 1983 season everything changed. The small and nimble BMW had a much better power-to-weight ratio and won the first two rounds, giving the new JPS team its first victories. But a spectacular televised crash at the start of the next round at Adelaide between Brock, Richards and Tony Hubbard (in Richards' old Falcon) put the BMW on its side and left it very badly damaged and ending Richards' championship. However, the two victories were sufficient to give him second equal in the final standings.

For the 1982 Bathurst race, Richards had British veteran David Hobbs as co-driver (Hobbs had raced with Gardner in his first Le Mans in 1962, winning their class). They finished a creditable 5th, 6 laps behind winners Peter Brock / Larry Perkins, and first non-V8 home. In the 1983 race the car was updated with new Group A engine components from Germany. Now developing 390 bhp the team was encouraged after a 2nd at the immediately preceding Castrol 400 at Sandown, behind Allan Moffat's Mazda RX-7. Richards (co-driven by Gardner himself) qualified fourth on the grid but fuel –contamination issues immediately affected the car, retiring on the 6th lap. Conspiracy theories swirled in the papers about sabotage but nothing was proven. Reliability however meant Richards finished second in the Endurance Championship.

However, when Australian touring car racing changed to the international Group A regulations in 1985, the BMW was suddenly a frequent race winner. International rules removed any bias to any manufacturers and kept the cars far closer to production trim. The car sat lower and had far better weight distribution so it was easier on tyres than the previous Group C counterpart. Richards easily won the 1985 Australian Touring Car Championship getting on the podium in 9 of the 10 rounds, and winning 7 of them. He also won the 1985 Australian Endurance Championship with four wins out of five. However, the big one, at Bathurst, eluded him.

That race was a triumph of the European entrants with the Jaguar XJ-S's of Tom Walkinshaw Racing first and third split by the Schnitzer Motorsport BMW. After leading in the early stages, because of better fuel mileage than the Jaguars, the JPS team's race was undone by oil on the track that put both team cars into the same sandtrap losing them four laps. Despite making back a lap he and up-and-coming co-driver Tony Longhurst could only manage 4th albeit first local entry home.

In recognition of his dominant season and remarkable turnaround, BMW announced Richards as their driver of the year with the 1985 BMW Achievement Award at a formal ceremony in Munich. Richards himself said "At Bathurst it brought it home to me. Like our car was not just a little bit quicker, but a lot quicker than the Schnitzer car and that was the best car they could muster for there. I reckon we had the best BMW that could be fielded anywhere in the world".

In 1986, the dominance of the JPS team was overtaken as other teams developed their cars. The championship was won by fellow-Kiwi Robbie Francevic in the Volvo 240T turbo. Richards finished third in the championship with just a single victory.

The 635 CSi was replaced by the smaller capacity BMW M3 in 1987, and Richards would again come to the fore, winning the 1987 Australian Touring Car Championship. Gardner shut down the JPS team at the end of 1987, and Richards re-joined Peter Brock's team for 1988, with the old HDT now running the BMW M3s after spending the previous 19 years racing Holdens. By 1988, however, the M3 itself had been overtaken as the car to have by the all-powerful Ford Sierra RS500. At the end of the year, Brock's team decided to race Sierras in 1989 while Richards was snapped up by Fred Gibson to race for his factory-backed Nissan team.

Richards competed in the NASCAR Australian Exhibition race at Calder Park Thunderdome twice, finishing seventeenth in the 1988 Goodyear NASCAR 500 due to engine issues and finishing 22nd in the 1988 NASCAR Christmas 500.

Driving for Nissan, Richards won his third ATCC in 1990 driving both the Nissan Skyline HR31 GTS-R and the mighty 4WD, twin-turbo R32 GT-R, affectionately known as "Godzilla". He would repeat as champion in 1991, finishing the ATCC ahead of his young teammate Mark Skaife. Skaife then put the GT-R on pole position at the 1991 Bathurst, before he and Richards cruised to victory in race record time, a lap ahead of the Holden Commodore of defending race winners Win Percy and Allan Grice.

Richards finished second to Skaife in the 1992 ATCC, before the pair then won their second straight Bathurst 1000 in a crash-shortened race which saw Richards crash the GT-R in a downpour on lap 145. However, as there had been a separate crash on that same lap (which Richards later became a part of while trying to drive back to the pits), the red flag was shown and the race was declared. As the rules state that the results would be from the previous lap, this saw a surprised Richards and Skaife declared race winners. On a personal note, the 1992 Tooheys 1000 was also a sad occasion for Richards when his longtime friend and former JPS BMW teammate, 1967 F1 World Champion Denny Hulme died at the wheel of his BMW M3 on lap 32 after suffering a heart attack.

Richards was only informed of Hulme's passing just before him and Skaife took to the podium as winners, and as a unruly crowd below booed the pair (they wanted the second-placed Sierra of Dick Johnson and John Bowe declared winners as they did not like a Japanese car dominating as the GT-R did), the normally friendly Richards let fly with his now famous speech:

"I'm just really stunned for words, I can't believe the reception. I thought Australian race fans had a lot more to go than this, this is bloody disgraceful. I'll keep racing but I tell you what, this is going to remain with me for a long time, you're a pack of arseholes."

— Jim Richards – Bathurst 1992.

His other Australian title wins were:

- 1985 Australian Endurance Championship in a BMW 635 CSi
- 1985 AMSCAR Series in a BMW 635 CSi
- 1986 Australian Endurance Championship in a BMW 635 CSi
- 1992 AMSCAR Series in a Nissan Skyline R32 GT-R
- 1995 Australian GT Production Car Series in a Porsche 993 RSCS
- 1996 Australian NASCAR Championship
- 1999 Australian GT Production Car Championship in a Porsche 993 RSCS
- 2000 Australian Nations Cup Championship in a Porsche 996 GT3
- 2001 Australian Nations Cup Championship in a Porsche 996 GT3
- 2002 Australian Nations Cup Championship in a Porsche 996 GT3
- 2003 Australian Carrera Cup Championship in a Porsche 996 GT3 Cup

His Bathurst wins have been:

- 1978 – Peter Brock / Jim Richards (Holden LX Torana SS A9X Hatchback)
- 1979 – Peter Brock / Jim Richards (Holden LX Torana SS A9X Hatchback)
- 1980 – Peter Brock / Jim Richards (Holden VC Commodore)
- 1991 – Mark Skaife / Jim Richards (Nissan R32 GT-R)
- 1992 – Mark Skaife / Jim Richards (Nissan Skyline R32 GT-R)
- 1998 – Rickard Rydell / Jim Richards (Volvo S40)
- 2002 – Mark Skaife / Jim Richards (Holden VX Commodore)

He has also won the Sandown 500 in 1985 with Tony Longhurst in a BMW 635 CSi, and again in 1989 with Mark Skaife in a Nissan Skyline HR31 GTS-R.

Recently, Richards has driven in the Targa Tasmania as well as numerous other tarmac rallies in the Australian Targa Championship and other tarmac rallies, driving for Porsche. Partnering Richards as a navigator has been motor racing journalist and commentator Barry Oliver. The pairing of Richards and Oliver (affectionately known as Team Grandpa in later years) have together won the Targa Tasmania a record 8 times. Richards and Oliver made their debut in Targa in 1993 in a Porsche 968 CS. His final victory saw him become only the fourth winner of the event in a two-wheel-drive car, and is the last person to do so, holding off more fancied four-wheel-drive rivals over a wet Day 5 to win his last Targa Tasmania title.

Targa Tasmania wins:

- 1996 – Jim Richards / Barry Oliver (Porsche 993 Turbo)
- 1997 – Jim Richards / Barry Oliver (Porsche 993 Turbo)
- 1998 – Jim Richards / Barry Oliver (Porsche 993 Turbo)
- 2000 – Jim Richards / Barry Oliver (Porsche 996 Turbo)
- 2001 – Jim Richards / Barry Oliver (Porsche 996 Turbo)
- 2002 – Jim Richards / Barry Oliver (Porsche 996 Turbo)
- 2003 – Jim Richards / Barry Oliver (Porsche 996 Turbo)
- 2006 – Jim Richards / Barry Oliver (Porsche 997 GT3)

== Career results ==
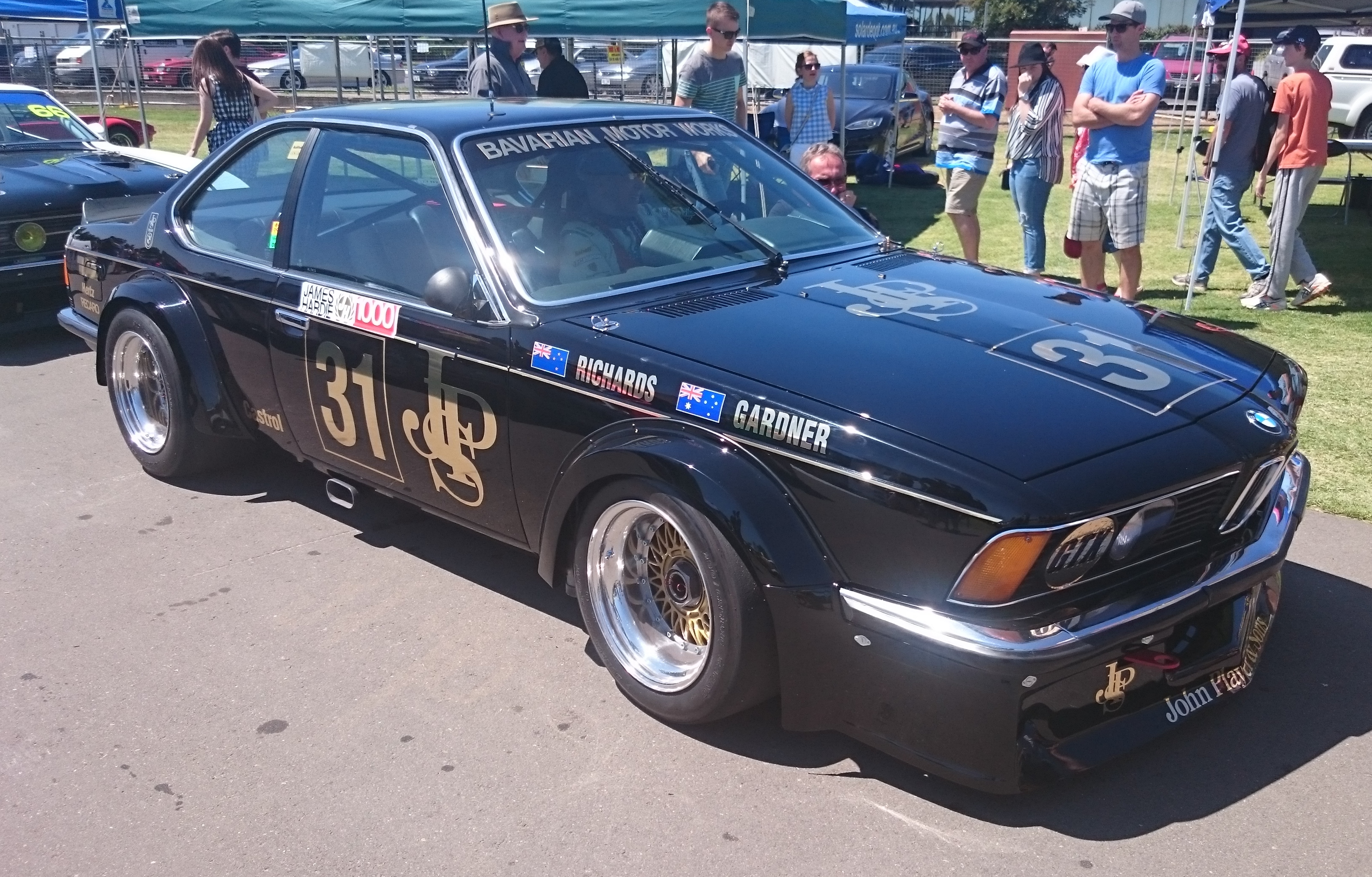
Richards drove a BMW 635 CSi in the Group C Touring Car category from 1982 to 1984

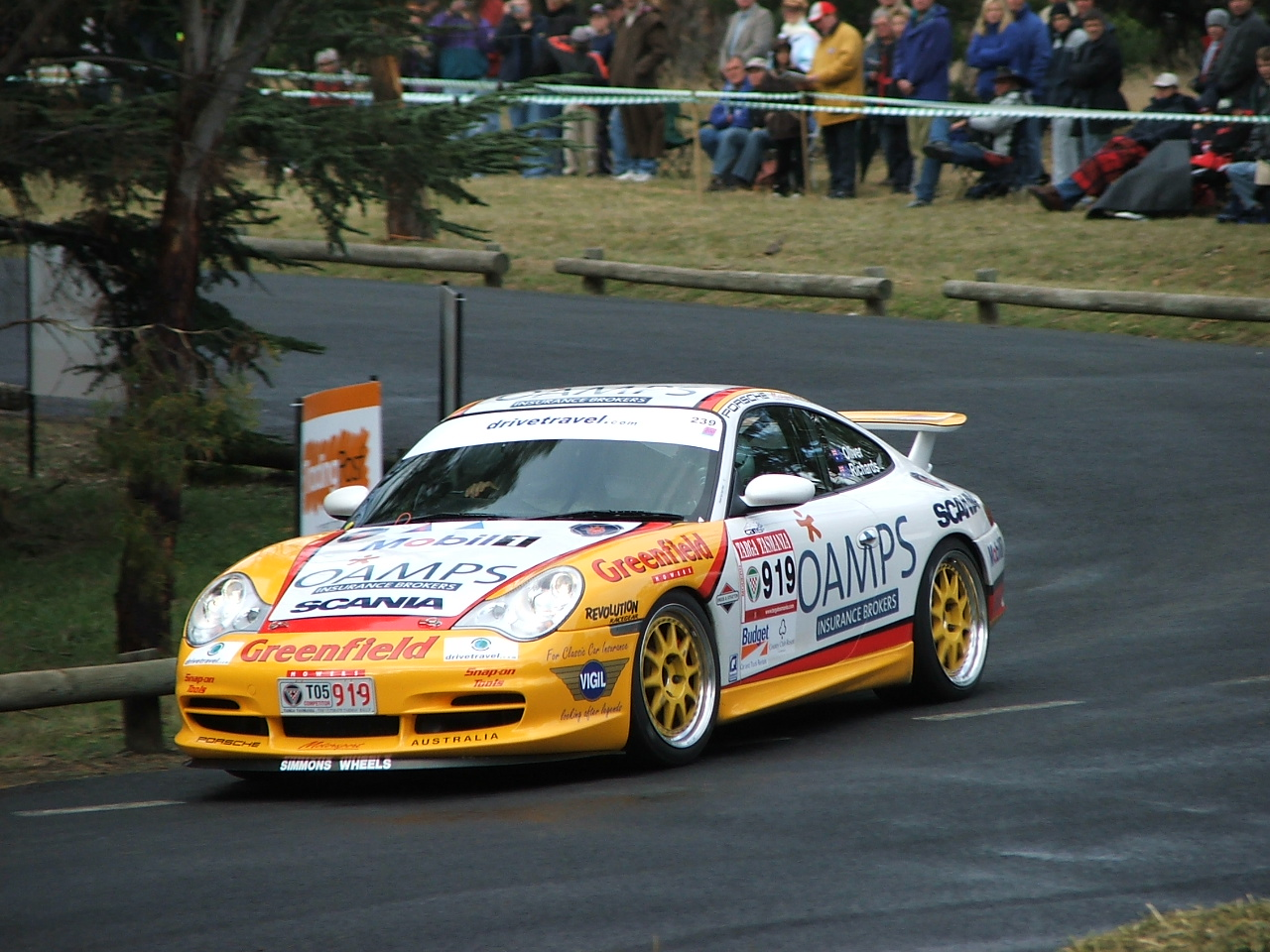
Jim Richards and Barry Oliver competing in the 2005 Targa Tasmania

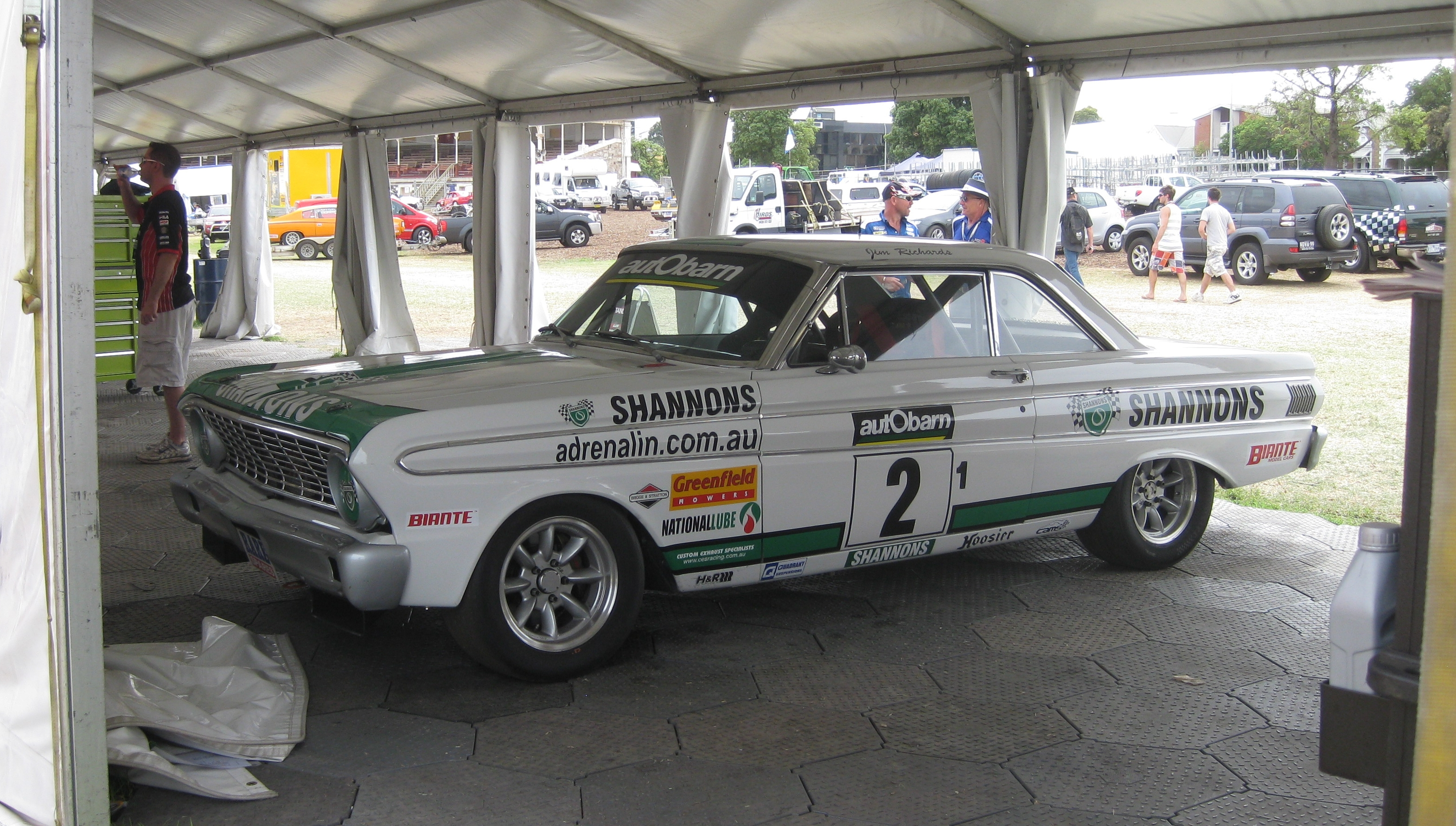
Richards won the 2010 Touring Car Masters at the wheels of a 1964 Ford Falcon Sprint

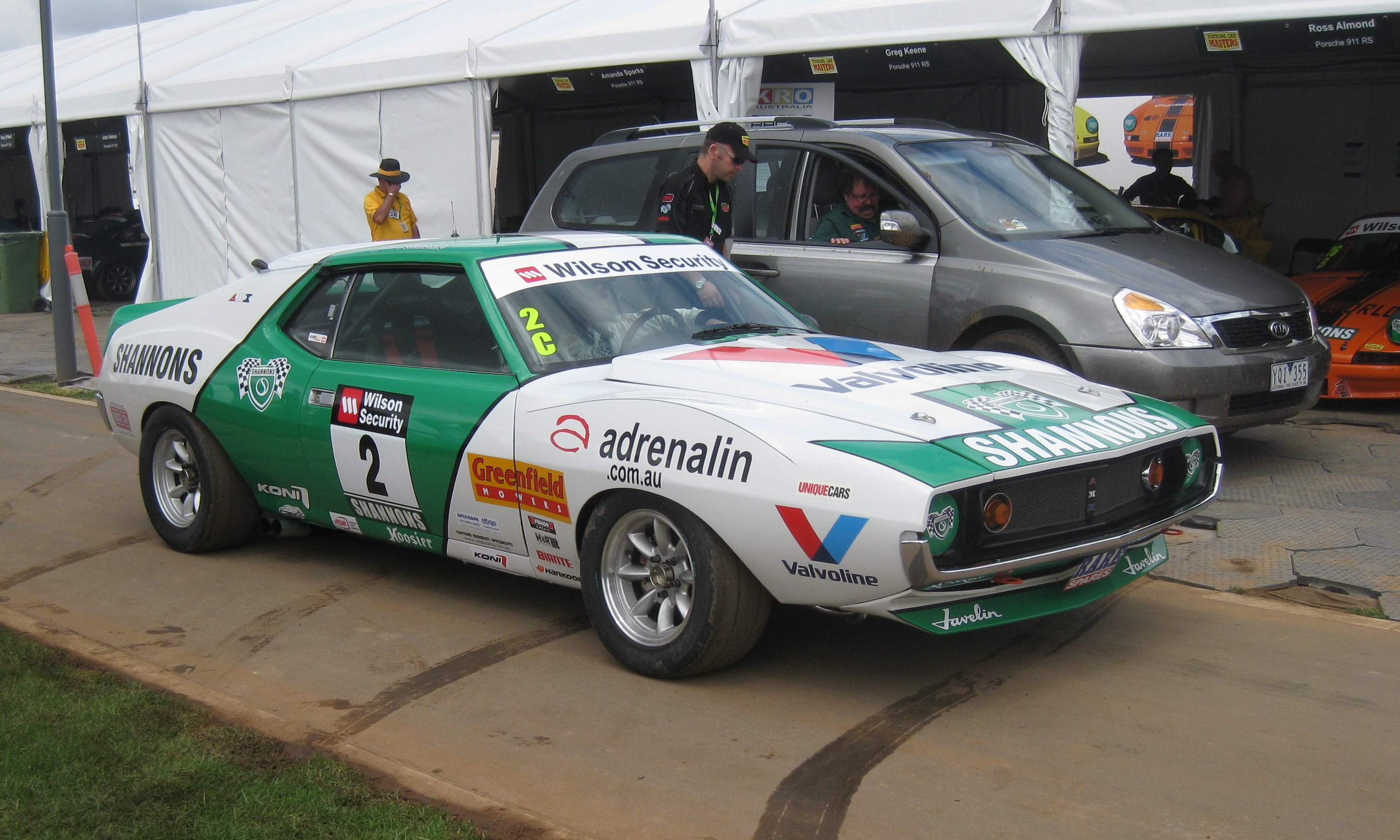
Richards placed second in the 2012 Touring Car Masters with an AMC Javelin AMX

Season	Series	Position	Car	Team
1972	New Zealand Unlimited Saloon Championship	1st	Ford Falcon GT	
1974	New Zealand Saloon Championship	1st	Ford Mustang	Sidchrome
1974	New Zealand Unlimited Saloon Championship	1st	Ford Falcon GT	
1975	New Zealand Unlimited Saloon Championship	1st	Ford Falcon GT	Sidchrome
1976	Australian Sports Sedan Championship	4th	Ford Mustang	Sidchrome
1976	Marlboro Sports Sedan Series	1st	Ford Mustang	Sidchrome
1977	Australian Sports Sedan Championship	4th	Ford Mustang	Jim Richards
1977	Australian Touring Car Championship	13th	Ford XB Falcon GT	
1978	Australian Sports Sedan Championship	2nd	Ford XC Falcon	Jim Richards Motor Racing
1979	Rothmans International Series	11th	Matich A53 Repco Holden	Jim Richards
1979	Australian Sports Sedan Championship	2nd	Ford XC Falcon; Chrysler VH Valiant Charger; Chevrolet Monza	Jim Richards Motor Racing; Clem Smith; Rotax Monza
1980	Australian Sports Sedan Championship	3rd	Ford XC Falcon	Jim Richards
1982	Australian Touring Car Championship	22nd	BMW 635 CSi	JPS Team BMW
1982	Better Brakes AMSCAR Series	9th	BMW 635 CSi	JPS Team BMW
1982	Australian Endurance Championship	36th	BMW 635 CSi	JPS Team BMW
1982	Australian GT Championship	13th	BMW 318i turbo	JPS Team BMW
1983	Australian Endurance Championship	2nd	BMW 635 CSi	JPS Team BMW
1983	Australian GT Championship	2nd	BMW 318i turbo	JPS Team BMW
1984	Australian Touring Car Championship	5th	BMW 635 CSi	JPS Team BMW
1984	Better Brakes AMSCAR Series	3rd	BMW 635 CSi	JPS Team BMW
1984	Australian Endurance Championship	NC	BMW 635 CSi	JPS Team BMW
1984	World Sportscar Championship	NC	BMW 320i	JPS Team BMW
1985	Australian Touring Car Championship	1st	BMW 635 CSi	JPS Team BMW
1985	Australian Endurance Championship	1st	BMW 635 CSi	JPS Team BMW
1986	Australian Touring Car Championship	3rd	BMW 635 CSi	JPS Team BMW
1986	Better Brakes/AMSCAR Series	3rd	BMW 635 CSi	JPS Team BMW
1986	Australian Endurance Championship	1st	BMW 635 CSi	JPS Team BMW
1987	Australian Touring Car Championship	1st	BMW M3	JPS Team BMW
1987/88	Australian Superspeedway Series (AUSCAR)	1st	Ford XF Falcon	Stillwell Ford
1988	Australian Touring Car Championship	4th	BMW M3	Mobil 1 Racing
1988	Asia-Pacific Touring Car Championship	NC	BMW M3	Mobil 1 Racing
1989	Australian Touring Car Championship	4th	Nissan Skyline HR31 GTS-R	Nissan Motorsport Australia
1990	Australian Touring Car Championship	1st	Nissan Skyline HR31 GTS-R; Nissan Skyline R32 GT-R	Nissan Motorsport Australia
1991	Australian Touring Car Championship	1st	Nissan Skyline R32 GT-R	Nissan Motorsport Australia
1991	Australian Endurance Championship	4th	Nissan Skyline R32 GT-R	Nissan Motor Sport
1992	Australian Touring Car Championship	2nd	Nissan Skyline R32 GT-R	Gibson Motorsport
1993	Australian Touring Car Championship	4th	Holden VP Commodore	Gibson Motorsport
1994	Australian Touring Car Championship	6th	Holden VP Commodore	Gibson Motorsport
1994	Australian Super Production Car Series	4th	Porsche 968 CS	Jim Richards
1995	Australian Touring Car Championship	12th	Holden VR Commodore	Winfield Racing
1995	Australian Super Touring Championship	16th	Hyundai Lantra; Ford Mondeo	Hyundai Automotive; Ross Palmer Motorsport
1995	Australian GT Production Car Series	1st	Porsche 968CS & Porsche 911 RSCS	Bob Jane T Mart
1996	Australian Super Touring Championship	8th	Vauxhall Cavalier	Jim Richards
1996	Australian GT Production Car Championship	2nd	Porsche 993 RSCS	Jim Richards
1996	Australian Superspeedway Series (NASCAR)	1st	Pontiac Grand Prix	Garry Rogers Motorsport
1997	Australian Super Touring Championship	5th	Volvo 850	Volvo Dealer Racing
1998	Australian Super Touring Championship	3rd	Volvo S40	Volvo Dealer Racing
1999	Shell Championship Series	62nd	Ford AU Falcon	John Briggs Motorsport
1999	Australian Super Touring Championship	2nd	Volvo S40	Volvo Dealer Racing
1999	Australian GT Production Car Championship	1st	Porsche 996 GT3	Jim Richards
2000	Shell Championship Series	33rd	Ford AU Falcon	John Briggs Motorsport
2000	Australian Nations Cup Championship	1st	Porsche 996 GT3	Jim Richards
2001	Shell Championship Series	35th	Ford AU Falcon	Ford Tickford Racing
2001	Australian Nations Cup Championship	1st	Porsche 996 GT3	OAMPS Insurance Brokers
2002	V8Supercar Championship Series	33rd	Holden VX Commodore	Holden Racing Team
2002	Australian Nations Cup Championship	1st	Porsche 996 GT3	OAMPS Insurance
2003	V8Supercar Championship Series	37th	Holden VY Commodore	Holden Racing Team
2003	Australian Nations Cup Championship	15th	Porsche 911 GT3	OAMPS Insurance
2003	Australian Carrera Cup Championship	1st	Porsche 996 GT3 Cup	Jim Richards Racing
2004	V8Supercar Championship Series	39th	Holden VY Commodore	Castrol Perkins Racing
2004	Australian Carrera Cup Championship	2nd	Porsche 996 GT3 Cup	Jim Richards
2005	V8Supercar Championship Series	47th	Holden VZ Commodore	Holden Racing Team
2005	Australian Carrera Cup Championship	2nd	Porsche 996 GT3 Cup	OAMPS Insurance
2006	V8Supercar Championship Series	58th	Holden VZ Commodore	Holden Racing Team
2006	Australian Carrera Cup Championship	4th	Porsche 997 GT3 Cup	OAMPS Insurance Brokers
2007	Biante Touring Car Masters	12th	Chevrolet Camaro	Sunliner RV
2009	Australian GT Championship	3rd	Porsche 997 GT3 Cup	Jim Richards Racing
2009	Touring Car Masters (Group 1)	4th	Ford Falcon Sprint	Jim Richards Racing
2010	Touring Car Masters	1st	Ford Falcon Sprint	Jim Richards Racing
2011	Touring Car Masters (Class C)	2nd	Ford Falcon Sprint	Jim Richards Racing
2012	Australian Touring Car Masters Series (Class A)	2nd	AMC Javelin AMX	Jim Richards Racing
2013	Touring Car Masters	1st	Ford Falcon Sprint	Jim Richards Racing
2014	Touring Car Masters (Pro Masters Class)	4th	Ford Falcon Sprint	Shannons Insurance
2015	Touring Car Masters (Pro Masters Class)	2nd	AMC Javelin	Shannons Insurance

=== Complete World Sportscar Championship results ===
(key) (Races in bold indicate pole position) (Races in italics indicate fastest lap)

Year	Team	Car	1	2	3	4	5	6	7	8	9	10	11	12	13	14	15	DC	Points
1981	Porsche Cars Australia	Porsche 924 Carrera GTR	DAY	SEB	MUG	MNZ	RIV	SIL	NUR	LMS; DNS	PER	DAY	WAT	SPA	MOS	RAM	BRA	NC	0
1984	(Australia) JPS Team BMW	BMW 320i	MNZ	SIL	LMS	NUR	BHT	MOS	SPA	IMO	FJI	KYL	SAN ovr:14 cls:1					NC	0

=== Complete World Touring Car Championship results ===
(key) (Races in bold indicate pole position) (Races in italics indicate fastest lap)

Year	Team	Car	1	2	3	4	5	6	7	8	9	10	11	DC	Points
1987	(Australia) JPS Team BMW	BMW M3	MNZ	JAR	DIJ	NUR	SPA	BNO	SIL	BAT ovr:4 cls:1	CLD; Ret			NC	0
1987	(New Zealand) Viacard Services	BMW M3										WEL ovr:19 cls:6	FJI	NC	0

† Not eligible for series points

=== Complete Asia-Pacific Touring Car Championship results ===
(key) (Races in bold indicate pole position) (Races in italics indicate fastest lap)

Year	Team	Car	1	2	3	4	DC	Points
1988	(Australia) Mobil 1 Racing	BMW M3	BAT; Ret	WEL; Ret	PUK	FJI	NC	0

=== Complete Australian Super Touring Championship results ===
Year	Team	Car	1	2	3	4	5	6	7	8	9	10	11	12	13	14	15	16	17	18	19	20	21	DC	Pts
1995	Hyundai Automotive	Hyundai Lantra	PHI; 1	PHI; 2	ORA; 1	ORA; 2	SYM; 1	SYM; 2	CAL; 1	CAL; 2	MAL; 1	MAL; 2	LAK; 1	LAK; 2	WIN; 1 DNS	WIN; 2 DNS								18th	9
1995	Ross Palmer Motorsport	Ford Mondeo															EAS; 1; 8	EAS; 2; 6						18th	9
1996	Jim Richards Motorsport	Holden Vectra	AMA; 1	AMA; 2	LAK; 1	LAK; 2	AMA; 1	AMA; 2	MAL; 1 Ret	MAL; 2; 7	WIN; 1; 3	WIN; 2 Ret	PHI; 1; 7	PHI; 2; 6	LAK; 1; 4	LAK; 2; 3	ORA; 1; 5	ORA; 2; 2						8th	60
1997	Volvo Cars Australia	Volvo 850	LAK; 1; 3	LAK; 2; 3	PHI; 1 Ret	PHI; 2; 5	CAL; 1; 4	CAL; 2; 5	AMA; 1; 5	AMA; 2; 5	WIN; 1; 4	WIN; 2; 4	MAL; 1; 2	MAL; 2; 5	LAK; 1; 5	LAK; 2; 4	AMA; 1; 6	AMA; 2; 5						5th	111
1998	Volvo Dealer Racing	Volvo S40	CAL; 1; 4	CAL; 2; 4	ORA; 1; 3	ORA; 2; 3	PHI; 1; 2	PHI; 2; 1	EAS; 1; 1	EAS; 2; 2	LAK; 1; 3	LAK; 2; 3	MAL; 1; 4	MAL; 2; 4	WIN; 1; 2	WIN; 2; 3	ORA; 1; 4	ORA; 2 Ret						3rd	161
1999	Volvo Cars Australia	Volvo S40	LAK; 1; 2	LAK; 2; 3	ORA; 1; 1	ORA; 2; 1	MAL; 1; 2	MAL; 2; 2	WIN; 1; 2	WIN; 2 Ret	WIN; 3; 1	ORA; 1; 2	ORA; 2; 2	ORA; 3 DNS	QLD; 1; 1	QLD; 2; 2	QLD; 3; 1	ORA; 1; 2	ORA; 2; 1	ORA; 3; 1	CAL; 1; 1	CAL; 2; 1	CAL; 3; 1	2nd	262

=== Complete Australian Touring Car Championship results ===
(key) (Races in bold indicate pole position) (Races in italics indicate fastest lap)

Year	Team	Car	1	2	3	4	5	6	7	8	9	10	11	12	13	14	15	16	17	18	DC	Points
1977	Sidchrome/Melford	Ford XB Falcon GT Hardtop	SYM	SYM	CAL	ORA; Ret	AMA	SAN	AIR	LAK	SAN; Ret	AIR; 6	SUR; 5	PHI; 3							13th	11
1982	JPS Team BMW	BMW 635 CSi	SAN	SAN	CAL	SYM	ORA	LAK	WAN	AIR	SUR; 3										22nd	6
1985	JPS Team BMW	BMW 635 CSi	WIN; 1	SAN; 2	SYM; 5	WAN; 1	AIR; 1	CAL; 1	SUR; 1	LAK; 1	AMA; 1	ORA; 3									1st	218
1986	JPS Team BMW	BMW 635 CSi	AMA; 2	SYM; 6	SAN; Ret	AIR; 10	WAN; 4	SUR; 3	CAL; 7	LAK; 5	WIN; 1	ORA; 5									3rd	147
1987	JPS Team BMW	BMW E30 M3	CAL; 5	SYM; 2	LAK; 1	WAN; 4	AIR; 5	SUR; 1	SAN; Ret	AMA; 1	ORA; 1										1st	193
1988	Mobil 1 Racing	BMW E30 M3	CAL; DSQ	SYM	WIN; 3	WAN; 5	AIR; 5	LAK; 7	SAN; 5	AMA; 4	ORA; 5										4th	58
1989	Nissan Motorsport Australia	Nissan Skyline HR31 GTS-R	AMA; 2	SYM; 6	LAK; 6	WAN; 7	MAL; 2	SAN; 4	WIN; Ret	ORA; 7											4th	57
1990	Nissan Motorsport Australia	Nissan Skyline HR31 GTS-R	AMA; 1	SYM; 7	PHI; 3	WIN; 1	LAK; 5	MAL; 3	BAR; 4	ORA; 1											1st	102
1991	Nissan Motorsport Australia	Nissan Skyline R32 GT-R	SAN; R1	SYM; R2	WAN; R3	LAK; R4	WIN; R5	AMA; R6	MAL; R7	LAK; R8	ORA; R9										1st	137
1992	Winfield Racing Team	Nissan Skyline R32 GT-R	AMA; R1	AMA; R2	SAN; R3	SAN; R4	SYM; R5	SYM; R6	WIN; R7	WIN; R8	LAK; R9	LAK; R10	EAS; R11	EAS; R12	MAL; R13	MAL; R14	BAR; R15	BAR; R16	ORA; R17	ORA; R18	2nd	214
1993	Winfield Racing Team	Holden VP Commodore	AMA; R1	AMA; R2	SYM; R3	SYM; R4	PHI; R5	PHI; R6	LAK; R7	LAK; R8	WIN; R9	WIN; R10	EAS; R11	EAS; R12	MAL; R13	MAL; R14	BAR; R15	BAR; R16	ORA; R17	ORA; R18	4th	99

=== Complete 24 Hours of Le Mans results ===
Year	Team	Co-drivers	Car	Class	Laps	Pos.	Class pos.
1981	Porsche Cars Australia	(Australia) Peter Brock (Australia) Colin Bond	Porsche 924 Carrera GTR	GT	–	DNS	DNS

=== Complete Bathurst 24 Hour results ===
Year	Team	Co-drivers	Car	Class	Laps	Pos.	Class pos.
2002	(Australia) Prancing Horse Racing Scuderia	(Austria) Matt Weiland (Indonesia) Maher Algadrie (Australia) Peter Fitzgerald	Porsche 996 GT3 R	1	451	15th	3rd

=== Complete Bathurst 1000 results ===
Jim Richards won the Bathurst 1000 seven times. His first three wins were in 1978, 1979 and 1980 with Peter Brock who himself won the race a record nine times (Richard's seven wins puts him second all time to Brock). Richards also had three wins with Mark Skaife and once with Swedish driver Rickard Rydell. Of his record 36 race starts, 22 were with a factory backed team for either Holden, BMW, Nissan or Volvo with only victory in a BMW eluding him. He finished on the podium 13 times with seven wins, three seconds and three thirds, plus one class win.

Year	Car#	Team	Co-drivers	Car	Class	Laps	Pos.	Class pos.
1974	9	(New Zealand) R Coppins	(New Zealand) Rod Coppins	Holden LH Torana SL/R 5000	3001 – 6000cc	158	3rd	3rd
1975	15	(New Zealand) R Coppins	(New Zealand) Rod Coppins	Holden LH Torana SL/R 5000 L34	D	147	8th	5th
1976	2	(Australia) John Goss Racing Pty Ltd	(Australia) John Goss	Ford XB Falcon GT Hardtop	3001cc – 6000cc	129	31st	10th
1977	10	(New Zealand) Melford Motors	(New Zealand) Rod Coppins	Ford XB Falcon GT Hardtop	3001cc – 6000cc	53	DNF	DNF
1978	05	(Australia) Holden Dealer Team	(Australia) Peter Brock	Holden LX Torana SS A9X Hatchback	A	163	1st	1st
1979	05	(Australia) Holden Dealer Team	(Australia) Peter Brock	Holden LX Torana SS A9X Hatchback	A	163	1st	1st
1980	05	(Australia) Holden Dealer Team	(Australia) Peter Brock	Holden VC Commodore	3001-6000cc	163	1st	1st
1981	05	(Australia) Holden Dealer Team	(Australia) Peter Brock	Holden VC Commodore	8 Cylinder & Over	103	21st	12th
1982	31	(Australia) JPS Team BMW	(United Kingdom) David Hobbs	BMW 635 CSi	A	157	5th	5th
1983	31	(Australia) JPS Team BMW	(Australia) Frank Gardner	BMW 635 CSi	A	6	DNF	DNF
1984	31	(Australia) JPS Team BMW	(Australia) Tony Longhurst	BMW 635 CSi	Group C	39	DNF	DNF
1985	1	(Australia) JPS Team BMW	(Australia) Tony Longhurst	BMW 635 CSi	C	160	4th	4th
1986	1	(Australia) JPS Team BMW	(Australia) Tony Longhurst	BMW 635 CSi	C	161	6th	5th
1987	44	(Australia) JPS Team BMW	(Australia) Tony Longhurst	BMW M3	2	156	4th	1st
1988	57	(Australia) Mobil 1 Racing	(Australia) David Parsons (Australia) Neil Crompton	BMW M3	B	68	DNF	DNF
1989	2	Nissan Motorsport Australia	(Australia) Mark Skaife	Nissan Skyline HR31 GTS-R	A	160	3rd	3rd
1990	1	Nissan Motorsport Australia	(Australia) Mark Skaife	Nissan Skyline R32 GT-R	1	146	18th	16th
1991	1	Nissan Motorsport Australia	(Australia) Mark Skaife	Nissan Skyline R32 GT-R	1	161	1st	1st
1992	1	(Australia) Winfield Team Nissan	(Australia) Mark Skaife	Nissan Skyline R32 GT-R	A	143	1st	1st
1993	1	(Australia) Winfield Racing Team	(Australia) Mark Skaife	Holden VP Commodore	A	161	2nd	2nd
1994	2	(Australia) Winfield Racing	(Australia) Mark Skaife	Holden VP Commodore	A	39	DNF	DNF
1995	1	(Australia) Winfield Racing	(Australia) Mark Skaife	Holden VR Commodore		65	DNF	DNF
1996	32	(Australia) Garry Rogers Motorsport	(New Zealand) Steven Richards	Holden VR Commodore		33	DNF	DNF
1997*	4	(Australia) Volvo Dealer Racing	(Sweden) Rickard Rydell	Volvo 850		159	4th	4th
1997	34	(Australia) Garry Rogers Motorsport	(New Zealand) Steven Richards	Holden VS Commodore	L1	161	2nd	2nd
1998*	40	(Australia) Volvo S40 Racing	(Sweden) Rickard Rydell	Volvo S40	ST	161	1st	1st
1998	35	(Australia) Garry Rogers Motorsport	(Australia) Jason Bargwanna	Holden VS Commodore	OC	161	3rd	3rd
1999	600	(Australia) PAE Motorsport	(Australia) John Bowe	Ford AU Falcon		82	DNF	DNF
2000	600	(Australia) Briggs Motor Sport	(Australia) John Bowe	Ford AU Falcon		147	DNF	DNF
2001	6	(Australia) Ford Tickford Racing	(Australia) Dean Canto	Ford AU Falcon		161	5th	5th
2002	1	(Australia) Holden Racing Team	(Australia) Mark Skaife	Holden VX Commodore		161	1st	1st
2003	2	(Australia) Holden Racing Team	(Australia) Tony Longhurst	Holden VY Commodore		161	5th	5th
2004	11	(Australia) Castrol Perkins Racing	(New Zealand) Steven Richards	Holden VY Commodore		148	21st	21st
2005	22	(Australia) Holden Racing Team	(Australia) James Courtney	Holden VZ Commodore		7	DNF	DNF
2006	22	(Australia) Holden Racing Team	(Australia) Ryan Briscoe	Holden VZ Commodore		24	DNF	DNF

* Super Touring races

=== Complete Sandown Endurance results ===
Year	Team	Co-drivers	Car	Class	Laps	Pos.	Class pos.
1976	(New Zealand) Jim Richards		Ford XB Falcon GT Hardtop	Class D : Over 3000cc	NA	DNF	DNF
1977	(Australia) Melford Motors		Ford XB Falcon GT Hardtop	A	NA	DNF	DNF
1982	(Australia) JPS Team BMW		BMW 635 CSi	D	105	10th	9th
1983	(Australia) JPS Team BMW	(Australia) Frank Gardner	BMW 635 CSi	Over 3000cc	129	2nd	2nd
1984	(Australia) JPS Team BMW	(Australia) Tony Longhurst	BMW 635 CSi	Over 3000cc	72	DNF	DNF
1985	(Australia) JPS Team BMW	(Australia) Tony Longhurst	BMW 635 CSi	A	129	1st	1st
1986	(Australia) JPS Team BMW	(Australia) Tony Longhurst	BMW 635 CSi	B	127	5th	5th
1987	(Australia) JPS Team BMW	(Australia) Tony Longhurst	BMW M3	B	118	DNF	DNF
1988	(Australia) Mobil 1 Racing	(Australia) Peter Brock (Australia) David Parsons	BMW M3	B	122	7th	1st
1989	Nissan Motorsport Australia	(Australia) Mark Skaife	Nissan Skyline HR31 GTS-R	A	161	1st	1st
1994	(Australia) Winfield Racing	(Australia) Mark Skaife	Holden VP Commodore	V8	161	2nd	2nd
1995	(Australia) Winfield Racing	(Australia) Mark Skaife	Holden VR Commodore		155	8th	8th
1996	(Australia) Garry Rogers Motorsport	(New Zealand) Steven Richards	Holden VR Commodore		73	DNF	DNF
1997	(Australia) Garry Rogers Motorsport	(New Zealand) Steven Richards	Holden VR Commodore		155	5th	5th
1998	(Australia) Garry Rogers Motorsport	(Australia) Jason Bargwanna	Holden VS Commodore	OC	144	7th	7th
2001	(Australia) V.I.P. Petfoods	(United Kingdom) Tony Quinn	Porsche 996 GT3	N	126	DNF	DNF
2002	(Australia) V.I.P. Petfoods (Aust) P/L	(United Kingdom) Tony Quinn	Porsche 996 GT3	G1	161	2nd	2nd
2003	(Australia) Holden Racing Team	(Australia) Tony Longhurst	Holden VY Commodore		140	10th	10th
2004	(Australia) Castrol Perkins Racing	(New Zealand) Steven Richards	Holden VY Commodore		155	15th	15th
2005	(Australia) Holden Racing Team	(Australia) James Courtney	Holden VZ Commodore		159	11th	11th
2006	(Australia) Holden Racing Team	(Australia) Ryan Briscoe	Holden VZ Commodore		157	21st	21st

== 1992 Bathurst 1000 ==
Due to extremely heavy rain, multiple cars had crashed and were stopped on the side of the track. On lap 144 race leader Richards, whose Nissan was barely driveable due to an earlier crash, slid off the race track and came to rest behind another stopped car. He was overtaken by several cars including Ford driver Dick Johnson who became the new race leader. The race was stopped soon after on lap 145. Normally the race results would have been wound back to the last completed lap, lap 144, and made Johnson the winner. However, due to the large number of crashed and stopped cars the race was wound back an additional lap to allow more cars to place; this made Richards the race winner.

This result was unpopular with fans both because most fans were Ford or Holden supporters unhappy with an imported Nissan winning the race, and because the winning car was crashed and undriveable. Fans usually greeted the race winners with cheers but instead Richards and Skaife were booed and thrown garbage at on the podium. Skaife gave a short speech after which Richards said very few words, "I'm just really stunned for words, I can't believe the reception. I thought Australian race fans had a lot more to go than this, this is bloody disgraceful. I'll keep racing but I tell you what this is going to remain with me for a long time. You're all a pack of arseholes." Podium MC and Channel 7 commentator Gary Wilkinson then suggested he could cool the crowd down with a champagne bath, to which Richards replied "I wouldn't bother."

Richards later apologised for the outburst, citing the fact that he had been told just before going out onto the podium that his longtime friend and former JPS BMW teammate Denny Hulme had died from a heart attack which he suffered while driving in the early part of the race.

== Legacy ==
In 2024, the Supercars Championship named an award in his honor, for the best driver over the championship year.

=== Winners ===
Year	Driver	Manufacturer	Source
2024	Chaz Mostert	Ford Motor Company	
2025	Broc Feeney	Chevrolet (GM)	

== See also ==
- 1998 Century Batteries Three Hour Bathurst Showroom Showdown

== Bibliography ==
- West, Luke (20 August 2021). The Immortals of Australian Motor Racing: The Local Heroes (Part of the 7-volume comprehensive sports collection). Immortals of Australian Sport (7-book series). Gelding Street Press. ISBN 978-1-925946-98-7.

Sporting positions
Preceded by Allan Moffat; Jacky Ickx	Winner of the Bathurst 1000; 1978, 1979 and 1980 (with Peter Brock)	Succeeded by Dick Johnson; John French
Preceded by Dick Johnson	Winner of the Australian Touring Car Championship; 1985	Succeeded by Robbie Francevic
Preceded by Robbie Francevic	Winner of the Australian Touring Car Championship; 1987	Succeeded by Dick Johnson
Preceded by inaugural	Winner of the Australian AUSCAR Championship; 1987/88	Succeeded by Tony Kavich
Preceded by Dick Johnson	Winner of the Australian Touring Car Championship; 1990 and 1991	Succeeded by Mark Skaife
Preceded by Win Percy; Allan Grice	Winner of the Bathurst 1000; 1991 and 1992 (with Mark Skaife)	Succeeded by Larry Perkins; Gregg Hansford
Preceded by Brad Jones	Winner of the Australian NASCAR Championship; 1995/96	Succeeded by Kim Jane
Preceded by David Brabham; Geoff Brabham	Winner of the Bathurst 1000; 1998 (with Rickard Rydell)	Succeeded by Paul Morris
Preceded by Mark Skaife; Tony Longhurst	Winner of the Bathurst 1000; 2002 (with Mark Skaife)	Succeeded by Greg Murphy; Rick Kelly
Awards and achievements
Preceded by Neal Bates	Peter Brock Medal; 2014	Succeeded by Molly Taylor
