= 2014 Australian Touring Car Masters Series =

Australian auto racing competition

2014 Touring Car Masters

Seasons
- ← 2013 2015 →

The 2014 Australian Touring Car Masters Series was an Australian motor racing competition for modified Touring Cars manufactured between 1 January 1963 and 31 December 1976. It was sanctioned by the Confederation of Australian Motor Sport as a National Series with Australian Classic Touring (3D) Cars Pty Ltd appointed by CAMS as the Category Manager. It was the eighth annual Touring Car Masters series.

The Pro Masters class was won by John Bowe (Ford Mustang), the Pro Am class by Mark King (Chevrolet Camaro RS) and the Pro Sports class by Chris Stillwell & Sven Burchartz (Ford Mustang).

== Calendar ==
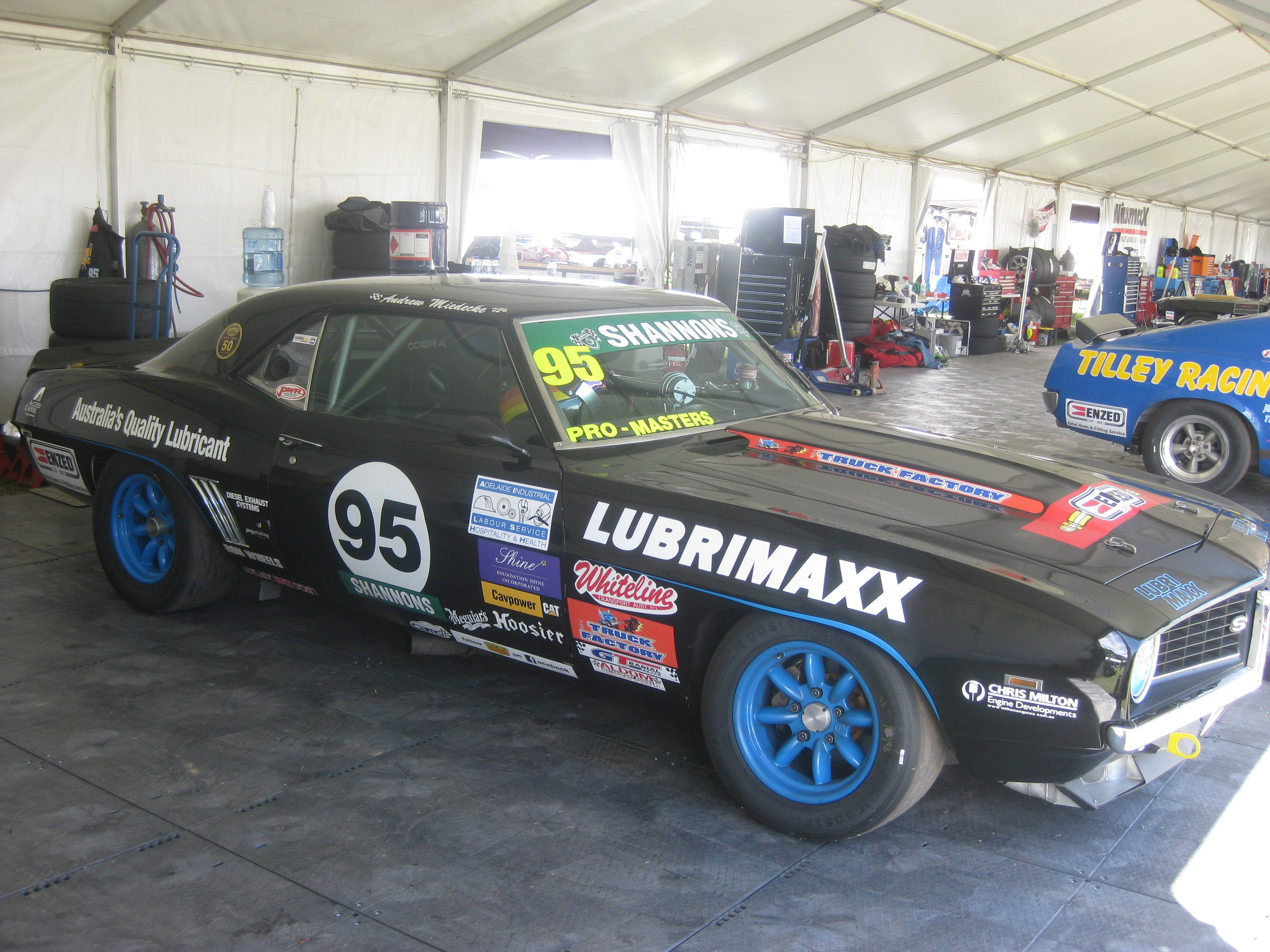
Andrew Miedecke placed 2nd in Pro Masters driving a Chevrolet Camaro SS

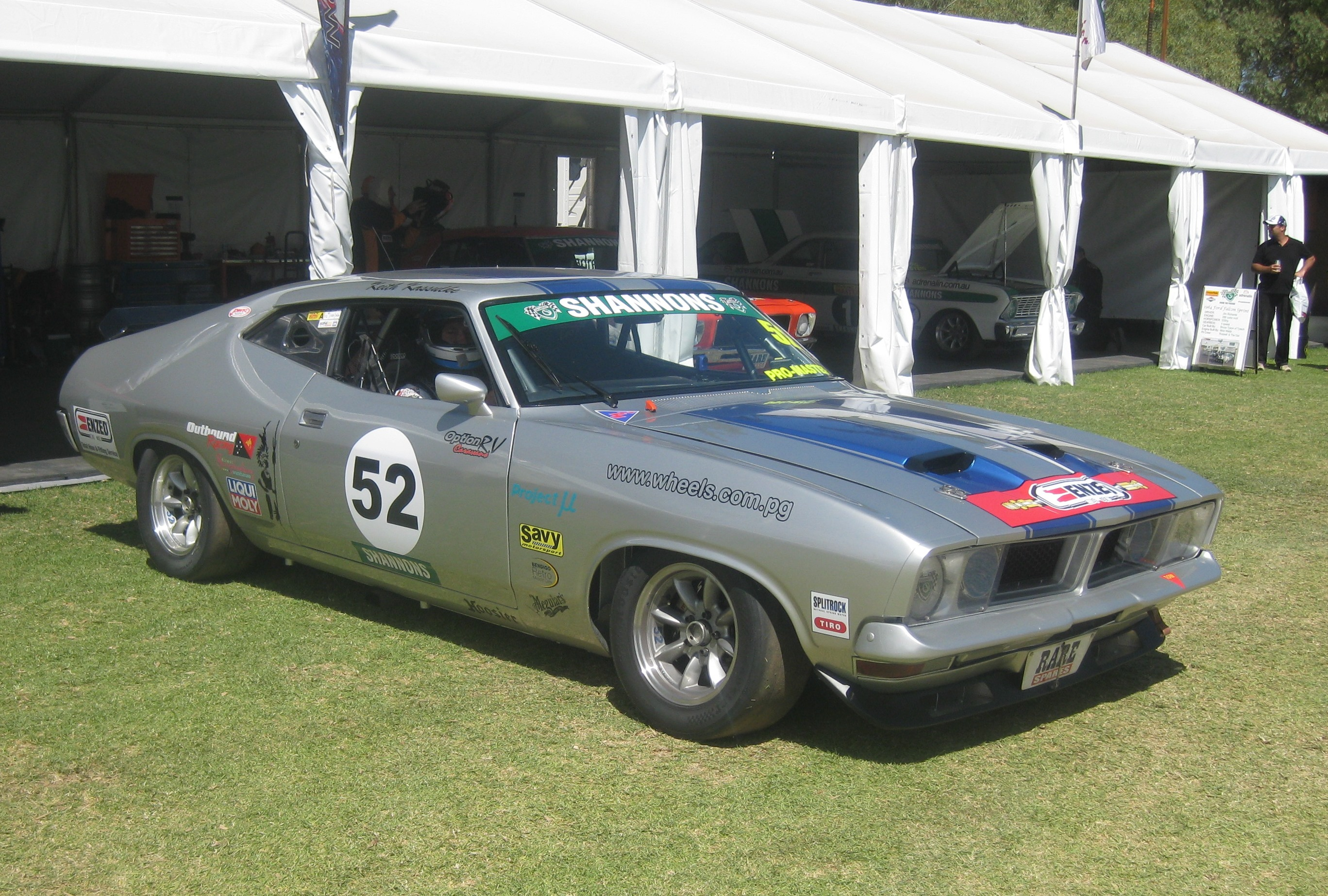
Keith Kassulke placed 3rd in Pro Masters driving a Ford XB Falcon Hardtop

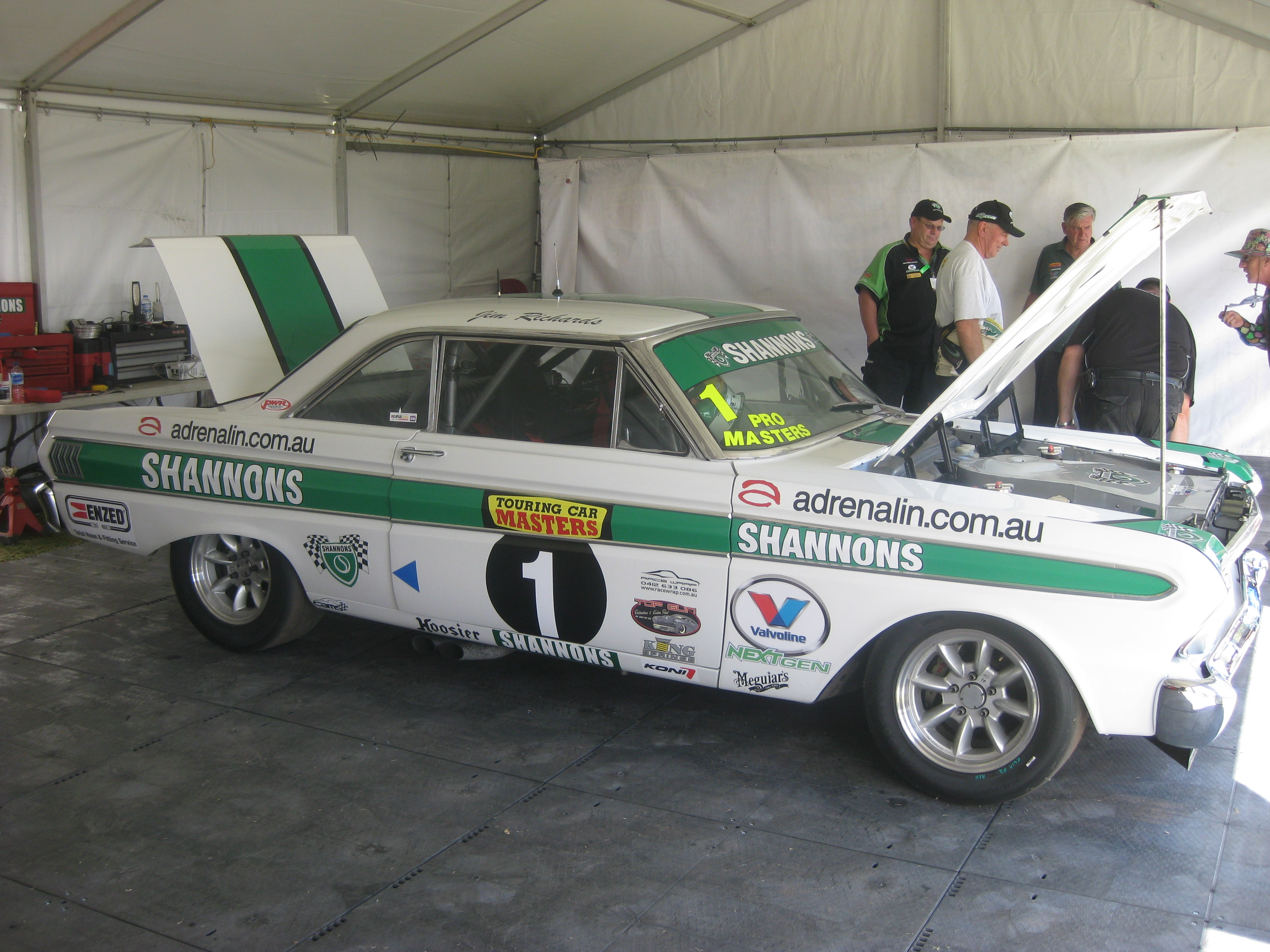
Jim Richards placed 4th in Pro Masters driving a Ford Falcon Sprint

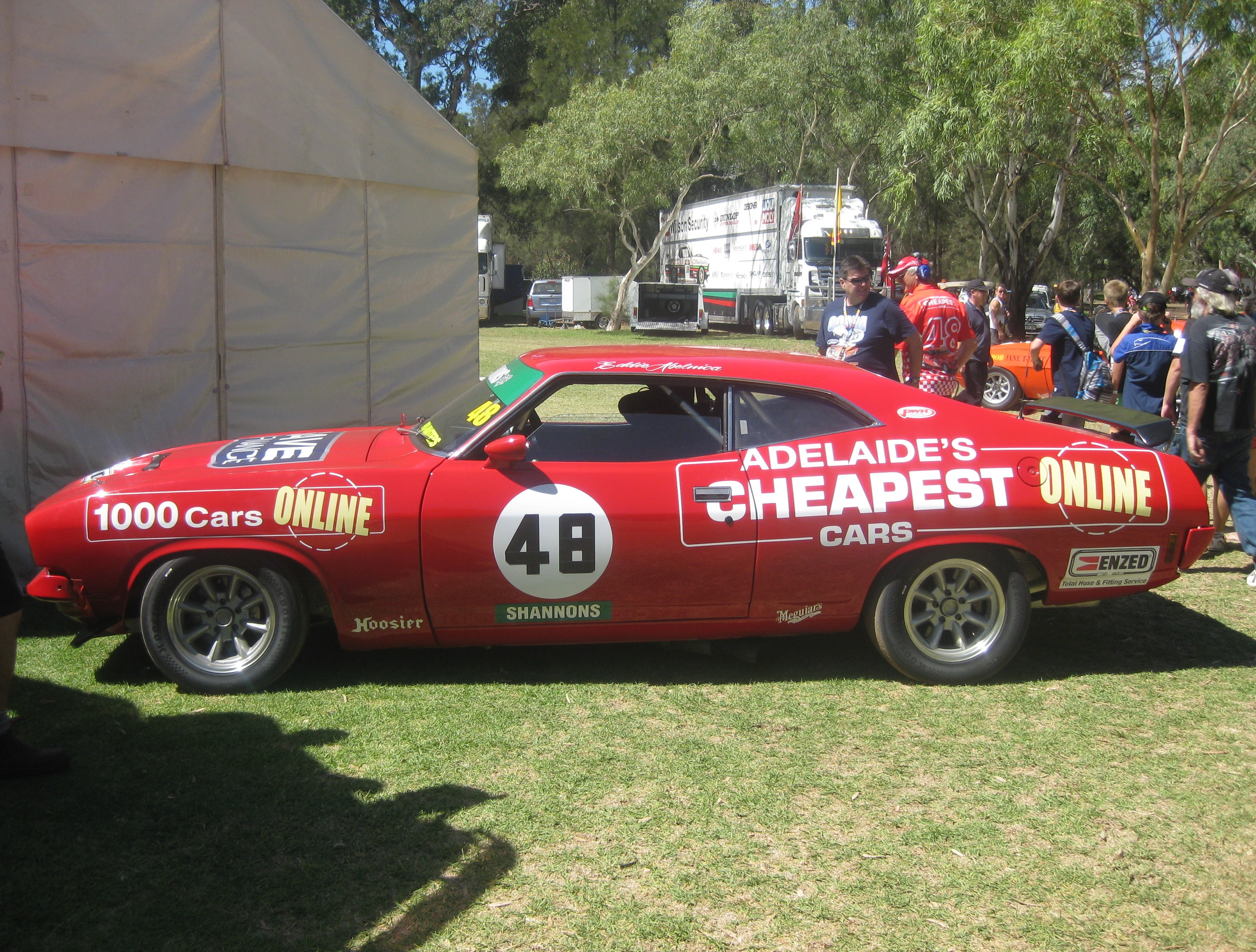
Eddie Abelnica placed 6th in Pro Masters driving a Ford XB Falcon Hardtop

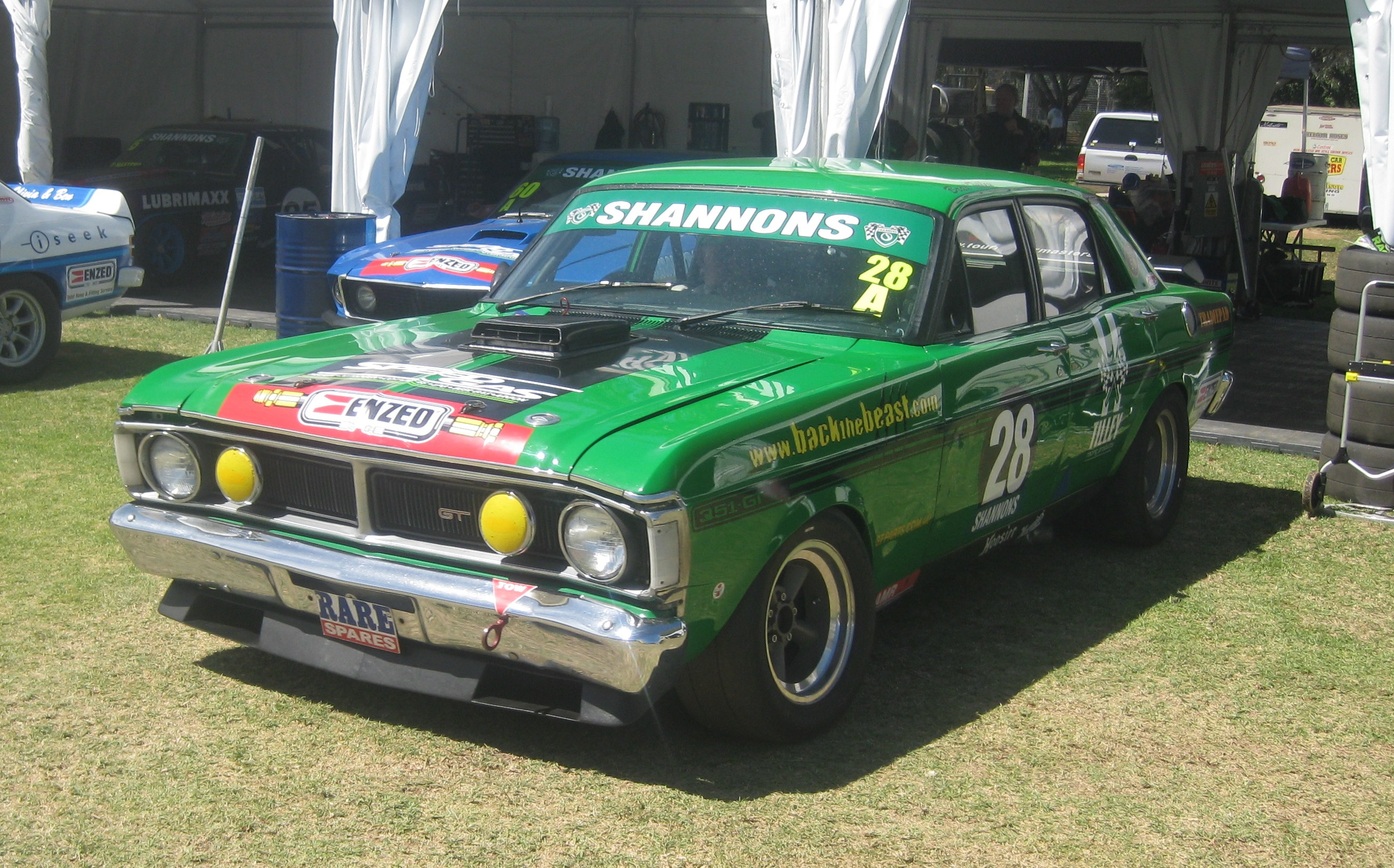
Brad Tilley placed 8th in Pro Masters driving a Ford XY Falcon GTHO

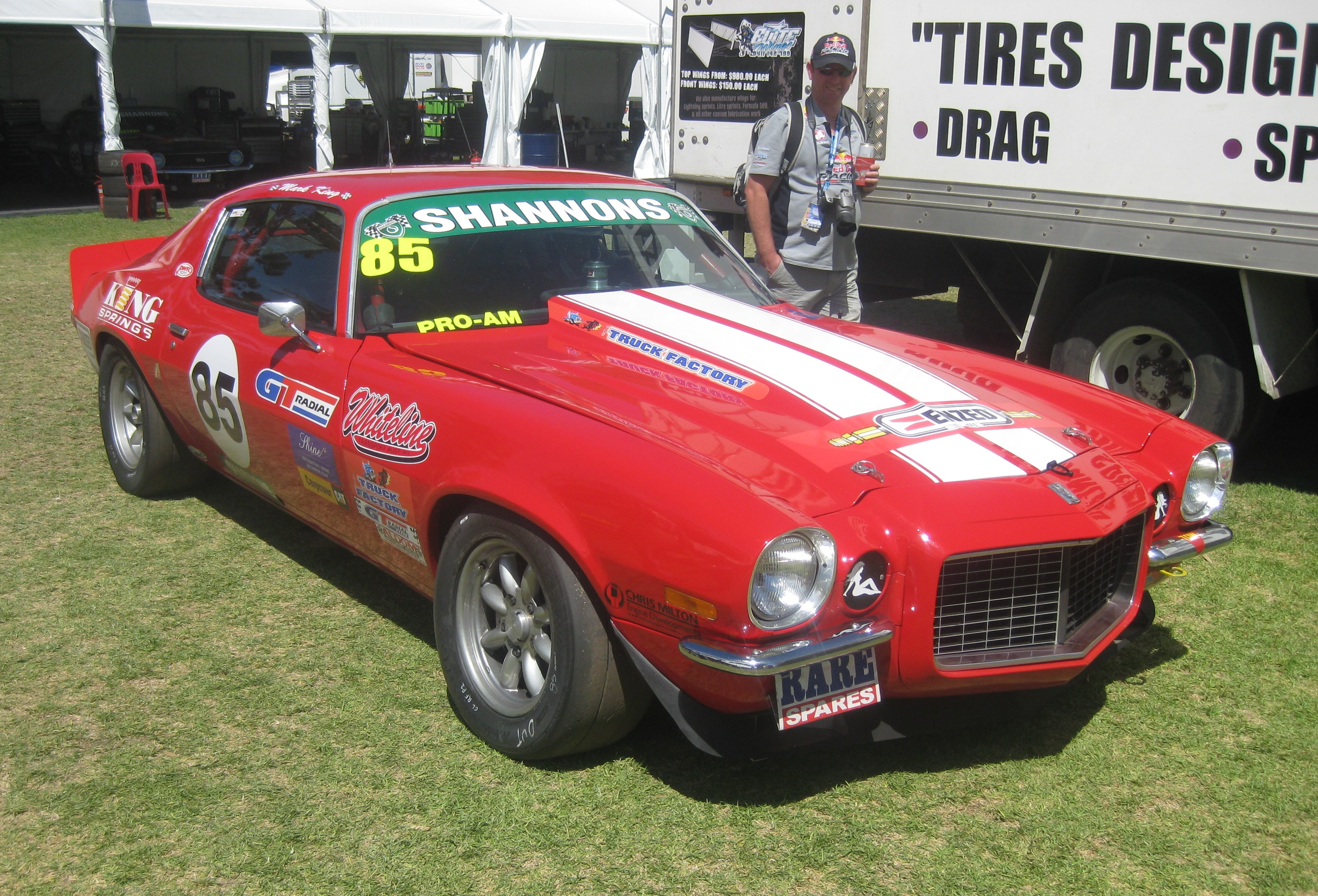
Mark King placed 1st in Pro Am driving a Chevrolet Camaro RS

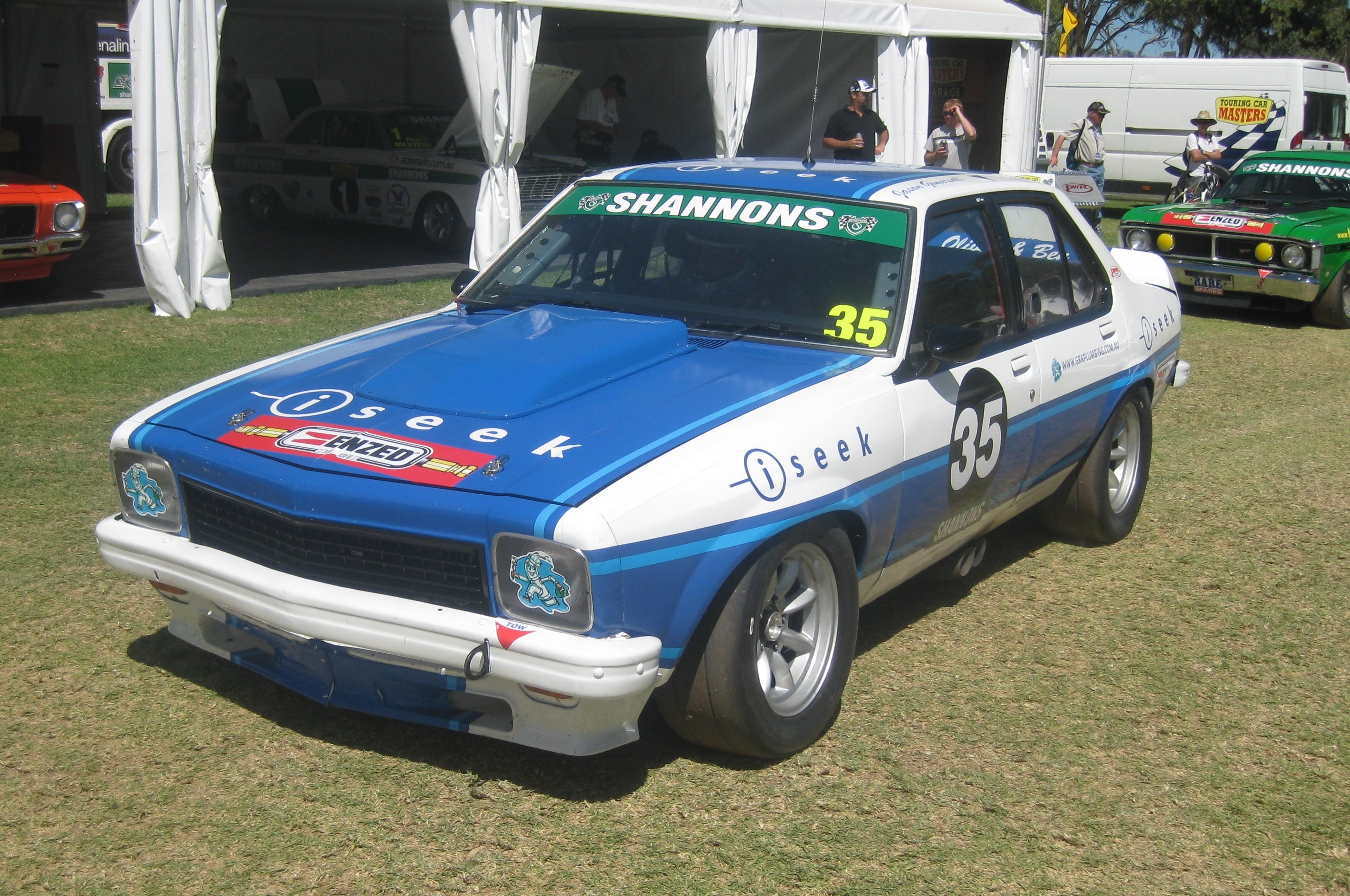
Jason Gomersall placed 4th in Pro Am driving a Holden Torana SL/R 5000

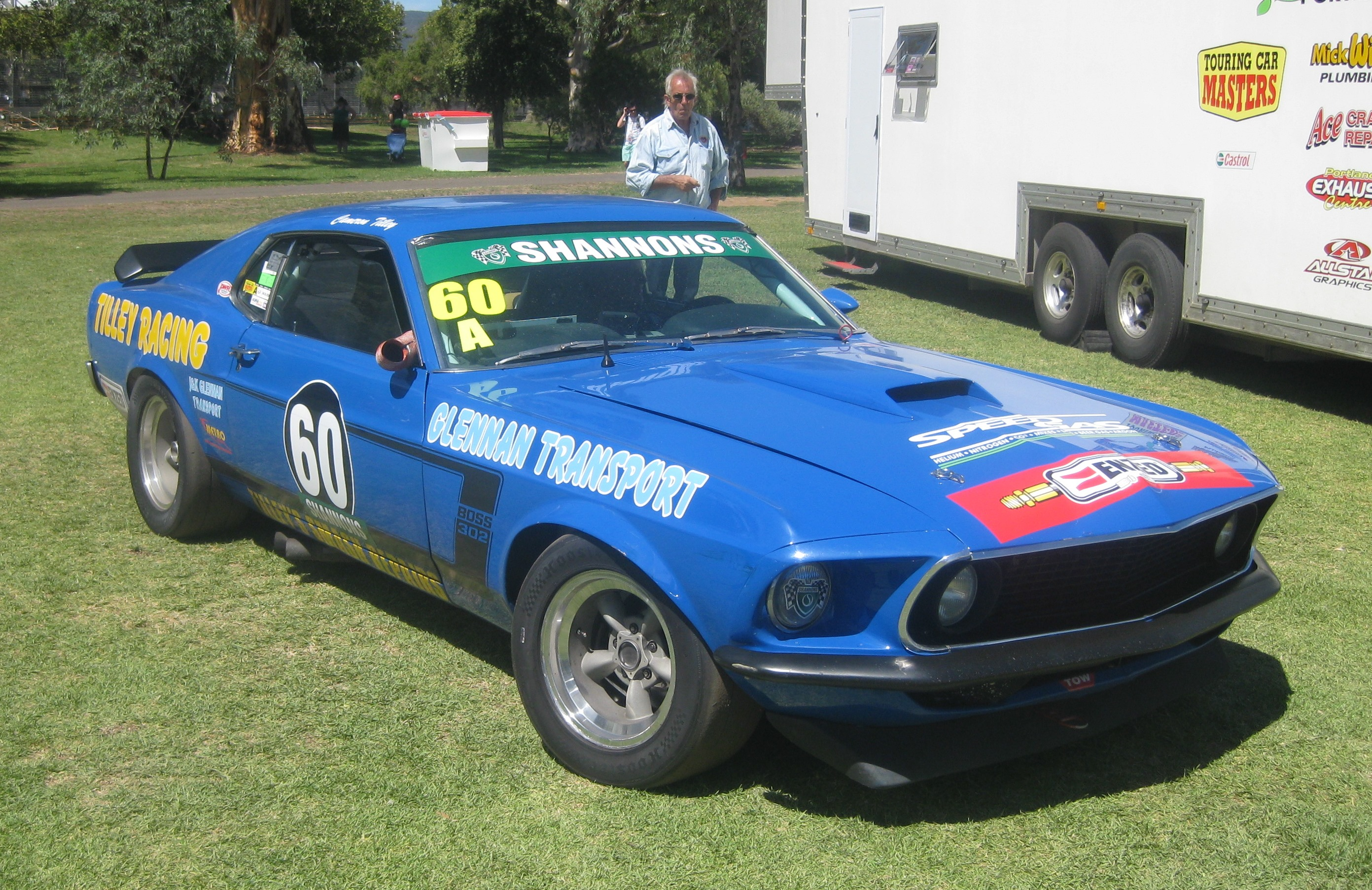
Cameron Tilley placed 8th in Pro Am driving a Ford Boss Mustang

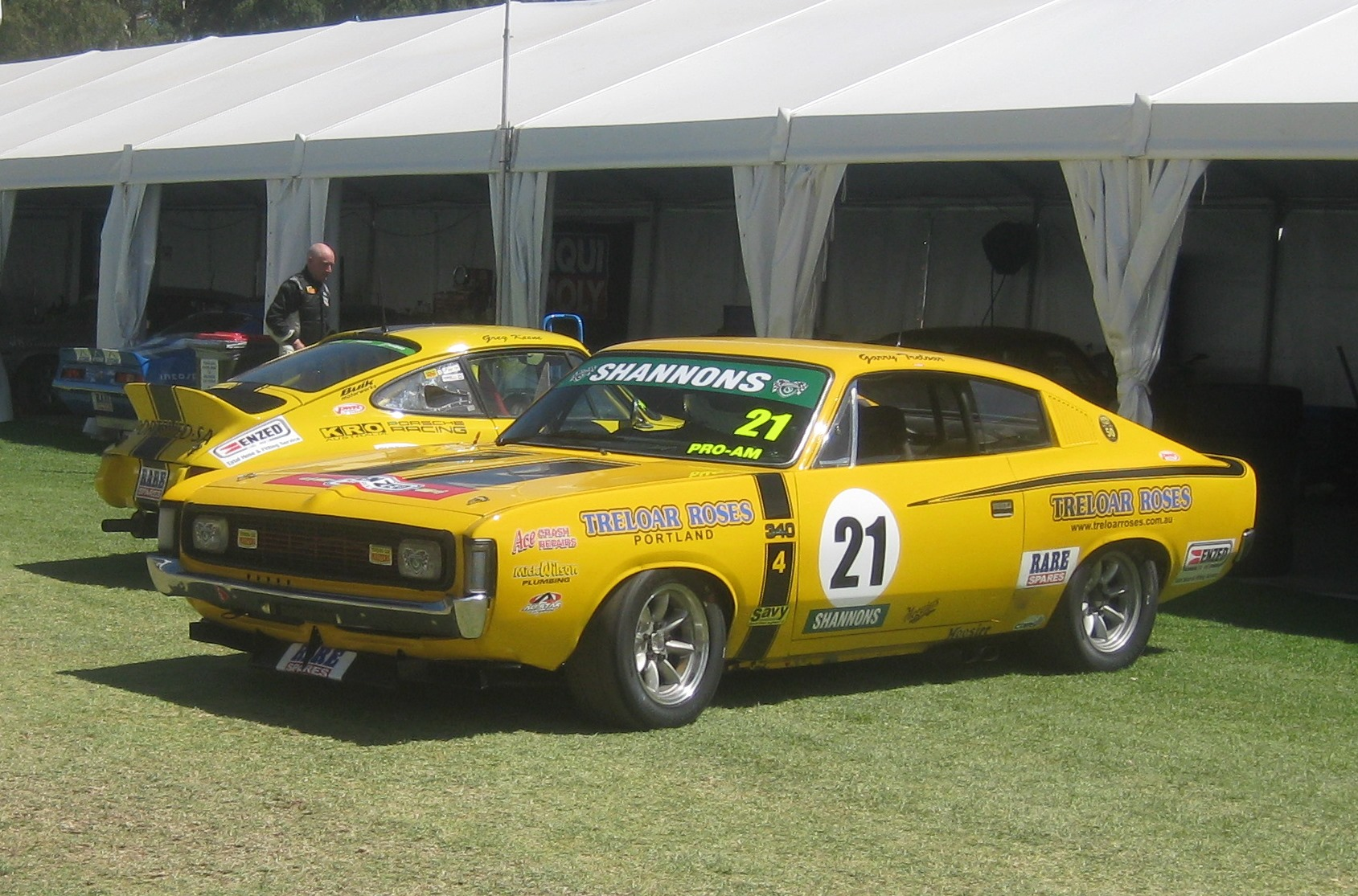
Garry Treloar placed 12th in Pro Am driving a Chrysler Valiant Charger E55

The series was conetested over seven rounds.

Round	Circuit	Date	Format
1	Adelaide Parklands Circuit	27 February - 2 March	Three races
2	Winton Motor Raceway	4–6 April	Three races
3	Hidden Valley Raceway	20–22 June	Three races
4	Sydney Motorsport Park	22–24 August	Three races
5	Sandown International Motor Raceway	12–14 September	Three races
6	Mount Panorama Circuit	9–12 October	Three races
7	Phillip Island Grand Prix Circuit	14–16 November	Three races

== Classes and points system ==
Each competing automobile was classified into one of three classes, Pro Masters, Pro Am or Pro Sport.

Series points were awarded on the following basis within each class in each race:

Pos.	1st	2nd	3rd	4th	5th	6th	7th	8th	9th	10th	11th	12th	13th	14th	15th	16th	17th	18th	19th	20th	21st	22nd	23rd	24th	25th	26th	27th	28th	29th	30th
Points	60	56	52	48	45	42	39	36	33	30	27	24	21	18	17	16	15	14	13	12	11	10	9	8	7	6	5	4	3	2

For the Pro Sport class only, up to three drivers could be nominated to compete in a car during the Series. Only one driver was permitted to compete at each round, however each nominated driver received Series points awarded to that car for each round of the Series.

== Series standings ==
Pro Masters										
Position	Driver	Car	Ade	Win	Hid	Syd	San	Mou	Phi	Total
1	John Bowe	Ford Mustang	168	168	172	172	154	83	172	1088.5
2	Andrew Miedecke	Chevrolet Camaro SS	165	129	104	176	154	56	172	956
3	Keith Kassulke	Ford XB Falcon Hardtop	143	128	156	128	138	100	144	937
4	Jim Richards	Ford Falcon Sprint	144	168	168	142	160	124	0	906
5	Greg Crick	Chrysler Valiant Charger	0	0	0	145	150	136	160	591
6	Eddie Abelnica	Ford XB Falcon Hardtop	160	160	70	0	0	0	0	390
7	Kim Jane	Ford XB Falcon Hardtop	0	0	0	0	153	125	0	278
8	Brad Tilley	Ford XY Falcon GT	45	0	0	0	0	84	0	129
Pro Am										
Position	Driver	Car	Ade	Win	Hid	Syd	San	Mou	Phi	Total
1	Mark King	Chevrolet Camaro RS	165	168	172	172	168	150	172	1167
2	Tony Karanfilovski	Ford Mustang	96	170	138	160	164	110	168	1006
3	Brett Youlden	Holden HQ Monaro	160	80	136	150	138	39	126	829
4	Jason Gomersall	Holden Torana SL/R 5000	123	90	114	84	172	84	121	788
5	Wayne Mercer	Ford XY Falcon GTHO	99	123	126	111	114	47	117	736.5
6	Carey McMahon	Holden Torana SL/R 5000	70	152	132	69	111	84	0	618
7	Les Walmsley	Holden HQ Monaro GTS	0	0	30	156	93	124	87	489.5
8	Cameron Tilley	Ford Boss Mustang	98	0	0	129	0	98	126	450.5
9	Paul Freestone	Chevrolet Camaro SS	48	0	0	52	90	46	149	385
10	Bill Pye	Chevrolet Camaro	0	0	0	117	0	93	56	266
11	Andrew Fisher	Ford XY Falcon GTHO	0	39	0	0	81	128	0	248
12	Garry Treloar	Chrysler Valiant Charger E55	124	0	72	0	0	0	0	196
13	Adam Bressington	Ford XA Falcon GT	0	0	157	0	0	36	0	193
14	Tony Hunter	Chevrolet Monza 2+2	0	0	111	0	0	80	0	190.5
15	Steve Mason	Ford Mustang	80	87	0	0	0	0	0	167
16	Nigel Benson	Holden HQ Monaro	78	0	0	0	0	0	0	78
Pro Sport										
Position	Driver	Car	Ade	Win	Hid	Syd	San	Mou	Phi	Total
1	Chris Stillwell / Sven Burchartz	Ford Mustang	156	148	150	116	168	92	168	998
2	Cameron Mason	Chevrolet Camaro SS	164	48	160	120	159	129	120	900
3	William Vining	Ford Mustang	92	125	146	160	156	54	160	893
4	Rusty French / Gavin Bullas	Porsche 911 RS	136	123	104	146	104	121	52	786
5	Greg Keene	Porsche 911 RS	180	160	56	0	129	140	0	665
6	Bruce McLeod	Ford XA Falcon	0	108	120	129	117	110	45	628.5
7	Mick Wilson	Chrysler Valiant Charger R/T	81	81	129	139	0	108	48	586
8	Leo Tobin / Keith Davidson	Holden HQ Monaro	129	123	39	96	139	0	0	526
9	Tony Hunter	Chevrolet Monza 2+2	0	172	0	0	0	0	0	172
10	Amanda Sparks	Porsche 911 RS	0	0	132	0	0	0	0	132
11	Rory O'Neill	Porsche 911 RS	120	0	0	0	0	0	0	120
12	Phillip Showers	Ford Escort RS1600	0	0	0	0	0	98	0	97.5
13	Graham Alexander	Holden HT Monaro	0	0	0	0	90	0	0	90

Half points were awarded in race two at Mount Panorama, Bathurst due to 75% of race distance not being reached.

There are minor discrepancies between round points and the total points for some drivers in the quoted reference at touringcarmasters.com.au (e.g. for John Bowe). The above table reflects the points as published in that source.
