= 2013 Touring Car Masters =

Australian motor racing competition

Seasons
- ← 2012 2014 →

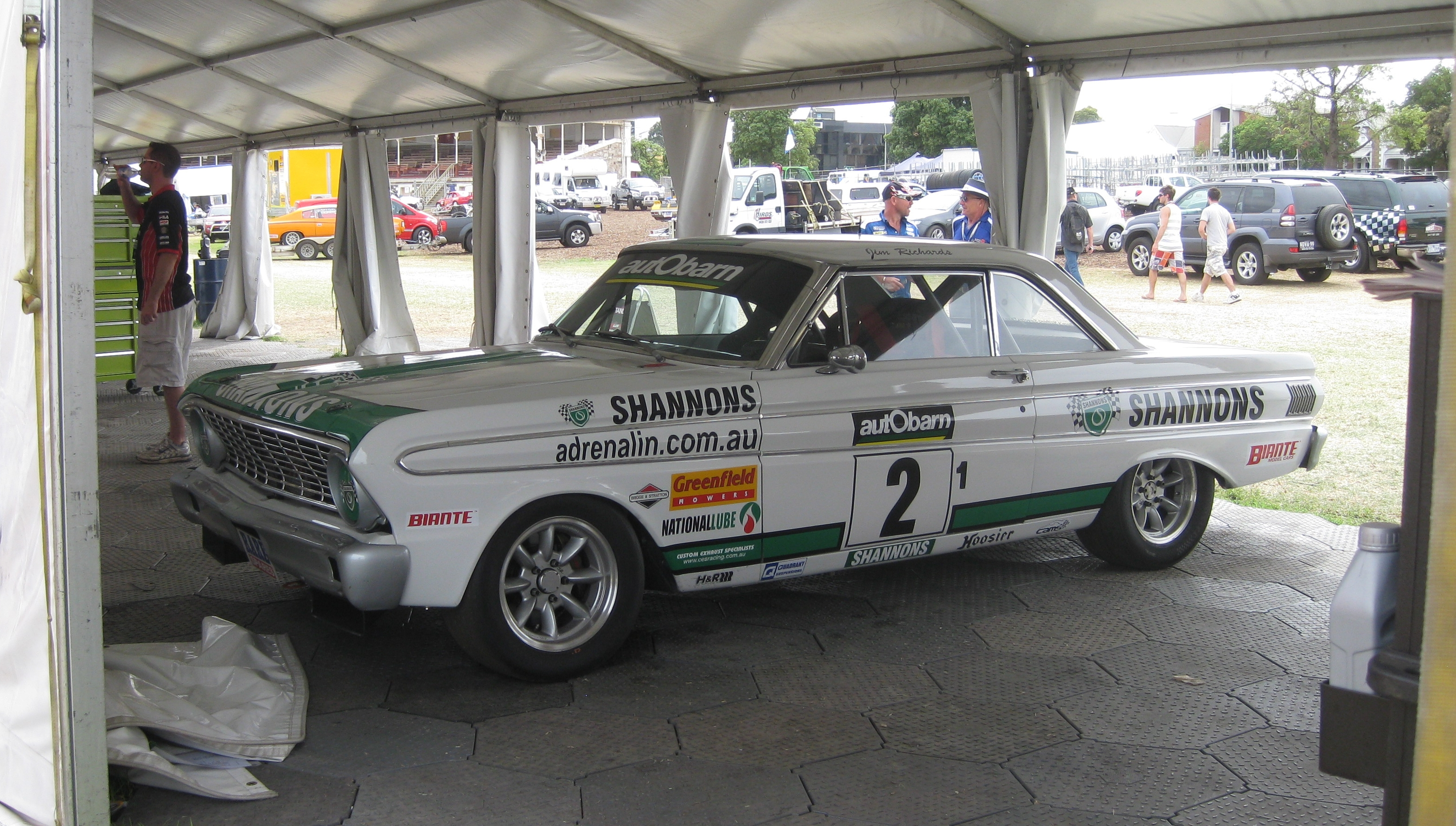
Jim Richards won Class A driving a 1964 Ford Falcon Sprint. The car is pictured in 2010.

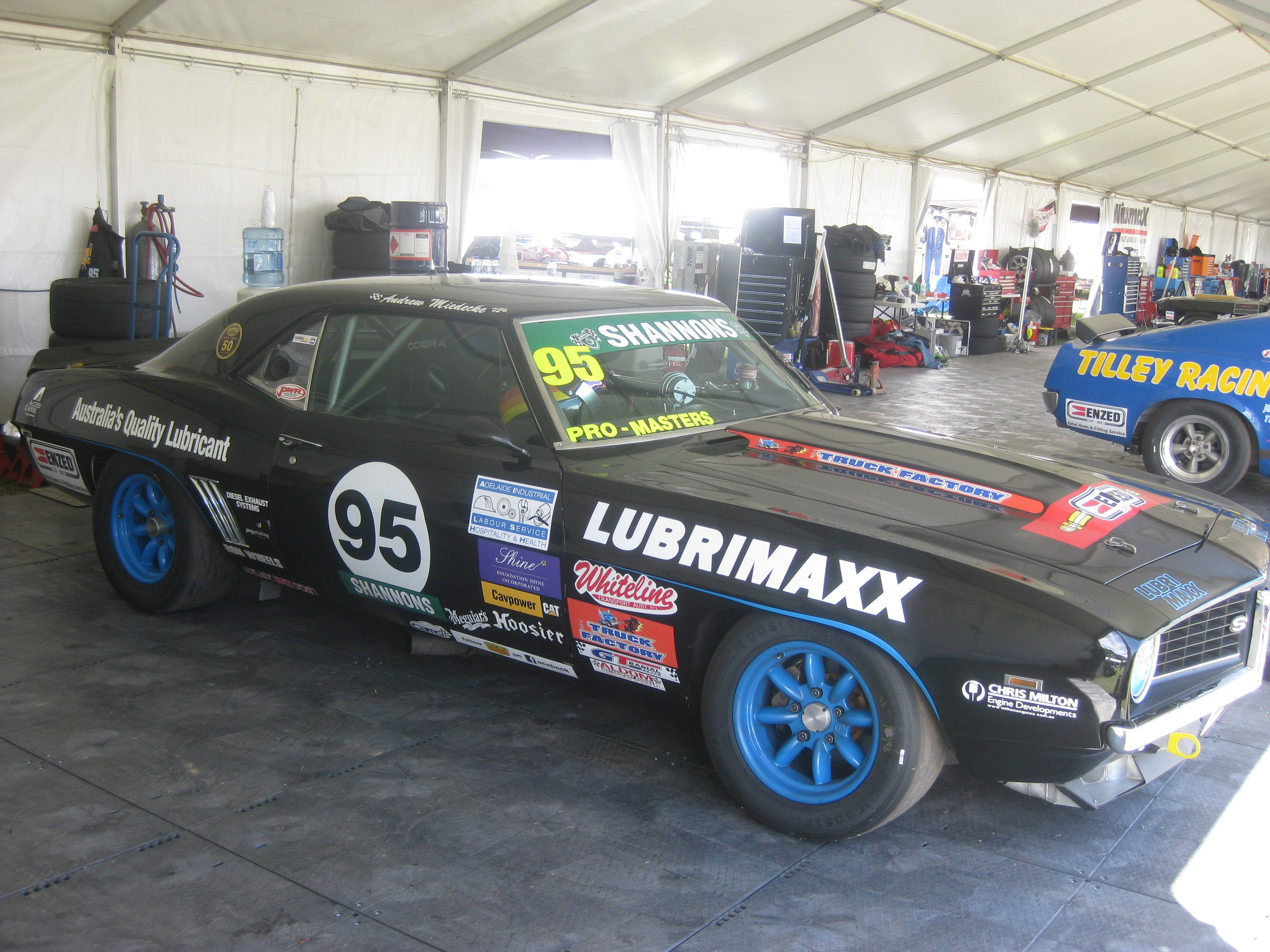
Andrew Miedecke placed third in Class A driving a Chevrolet Camaro SS. The car is pictured in 2014

The 2013 Touring Car Masters was an Australian motor racing competition for modified Touring Cars manufactured between 1 January 1963 and 31 December 1976. It was sanctioned by the Confederation of Australian Motor Sport as a National Series with Australian Classic Touring (3D) Cars Pty Ltd appointed by CAMS as the Category Manager. It was the seventh annual Touring Car Masters series.

The series began on 9 March 2013 at Sydney Motorsport Park and finished on 24 November at Phillip Island. Six rounds were contested as support races to the 2013 International V8 Supercars Championship and rounds were also held at the Top Gear Festival and Muscle Car Masters events.

2010 winner Jim Richards won the series over defending winner John Bowe. Bowe won five of the eight rounds and eleven of the twenty-four races, compared to Richards' two race wins, but fell behind Richards after being excluded from the Sandown round for making contact with an official. Andrew Miedecke finished third in the series with two round and five race wins but his series aspirations were hurt by a points penalty for causing an accident at Bathurst. In Class B, 2007 outright series winner Steve Mason won from Greg Keene and William Vining.

== Entries ==
The following drivers competed in the series:

No.	Driver	Car
3	(Australia) Steve Mason	Ford Mustang
4	(Australia) Rusty French	Porsche 911RS
5	(Australia) Tony Edwards	Holden Torana SL/R 5000
6	(Australia) Chris Stillwell	Ford Mustang
8	(Australia) Gary O'Brien	Holden HQ Monaro GTS
9	(Australia) Steve Makarios	Ford XY Falcon GTHO
11	(Australia) Gavin Bullas	Ford XA Falcon GT
12	(New Zealand) Jim Richards	Ford Falcon Sprint
13	(Australia) Rory O'Neill	Porsche 911RS
14	(Australia) Phillip Showers	Holden HQ Monaro
15	(Australia) Cameron Mason (Australia) Andrew Adams	Chevrolet Camaro SS
18	(Australia) John Bowe (Australia) Stephen White^{†}	Ford Mustang
21	(Australia) Garry Treloar	Chrysler Valiant Charger E55
22	(Australia) Nigel Benson	Chevrolet Camaro
25	(Australia) Paul Freestone	Chevrolet Camaro SS
26	(Australia) Michael Almond	Porsche 911RS
27	(Australia) Adam Bressington	Holden HQ Monaro
28	(Australia) Brad Tilley	Ford XY Falcon GTHO
30	(Australia) Glenn Seton	Ford XY Falcon GTHO
32	(Australia) Amanda Sparks	Porsche 911RS
33	(Australia) Greg Keene	Porsche 911RS
35	(Australia) Jason Gomersall	Holden Torana SL/R 5000
43	(Australia) Mick Wilson	Chrysler Valiant Charger R/T
46	(Australia) Leo Tobin	Holden HQ Monaro
48	(Australia) Eddie Abelnica	Ford XB Falcon
52	(Papua New Guinea) Keith Kassulke	Ford XB Falcon
56	(Australia) Brett Youlden	Holden HQ Monaro
57	(Australia) Graham Alexander	Holden HT Monaro
60	(Australia) Cameron Tilley	Ford Boss Mustang
74	(Australia) Wayne Mercer	Ford XY Falcon GTHO
75	(Australia) Greg Crick	Chrysler Valiant Charger E55
85	(Australia) Mark King	Chevrolet Camaro RS
88	(Australia) Tony Karanfilovski	Ford XY Falcon GTHO; Ford Mustang
95	(Australia) Andrew Miedecke	Chevrolet Camaro SS
98	(Australia) William Vining	Ford Mustang
99	(Australia) Les Walmsley	Holden HQ Monaro

† - John Bowe was excluded from taking part in the Sandown event after making contact with an official in the pit lane following a practice session. Stephen White replaced him for the rest of the event.

== Calendar ==
The 2013 series consisted of eight rounds:

Round	Event	Circuit	Location	Date	Winner
1	(New South Wales) Top Gear Festival	Sydney Motorsport Park	Sydney, New South Wales	9–10 March	John Bowe
2	(Western Australia) Perth 360	Barbagallo Raceway	Perth, Western Australia	3–5 May	Andrew Miedecke
3	(Northern Territory) Skycity Triple Crown	Hidden Valley Raceway	Darwin, Northern Territory	14–16 June	John Bowe
4	(Queensland) Ipswich 360	Queensland Raceway	Ipswich, Queensland	27–28 July	John Bowe
5	(New South Wales) Muscle Car Masters	Sydney Motorsport Park	Sydney, New South Wales	30 August–1 September	John Bowe
6	(Victoria (state)) Sandown 500	Sandown Raceway	Melbourne, Victoria	13–15 September	Andrew Miedecke
7	(New South Wales) Bathurst 1000	Mount Panorama Circuit	Bathurst, New South Wales	10–13 October	John Bowe
8	(Victoria (state)) Phillip Island 360	Phillip Island Grand Prix Circuit	Phillip Island, Victoria	22–24 November	Keith Kassulke

== Points system ==
Each competing automobile was classified into one of two classes, Class A, Outright or Class B, Pro-Sportman.

Points are awarded as follows to the top thirty finishers in each class.

Position	1st	2nd	3rd	4th	5th	6th	7th	8th	9th	10th	11th	12th	13th	14th	15th	16th	17th	18th	19th	20th	21st	22nd	23rd	24th	25th	26th	27th	28th	29th	30th
Points	60	56	52	48	45	42	39	36	33	30	27	24	21	18	17	16	15	14	13	12	11	10	9	8	7	6	5	4	3	2

Only half points were awarded for Race 1 of Round 7 at Mount Panorama due to the race being shortening on account of an accident.

The results for each round of the Series were determined by the number of points scored by each driver (including Guest Drivers) in each Class at that round.

Any points scored by a driver within a class were not transferred if that driver changed classes.

== Series standings ==
Pos.	Driver	Syd. (New South Wales)			Bar. (Western Australia)			Hid. (Northern Territory)			Que. (Queensland)			Syd. (New South Wales)			San. (Victoria (state))			Mou. (New South Wales)			Phi. (Victoria (state))			Pen.	Pts.
Class A: Outright
1	(New Zealand) Jim Richards	2 (2)	4 (4)	3 (3)	4 (4)	6 (5)	1 (1)	7 (7)	2 (2)	3 (3)	8 (8)	1 (1)	8 (8)	3 (3)	4 (3)	5 (4)	2 (2)	2 (2)	2 (2)	3 (3)	5 (5)	2 (2)	15 (12)	10 (10)	8 (8)	0	1122
2	(Australia) John Bowe	**1** (1)	1 (1)	1 (1)	2 (2)	4 (4)	11 (9)	**1** (1)	1 (1)	1 (1)	1 (1)	2 (2)	1 (1)	**1** (1)	2 (1)	2 (2)	EX	EX	EX	2 (2)	6 (6)	1 (1)	**7** (7)	3 (3)	6 (6)	0	1112
3	(Australia) Andrew Miedecke	3 (3)	6 (6)	2 (2)	5 (5)	2 (2)	2 (2)	8 (8)	3 (3)	5 (5)	3 (3)	3 (3)	7 (7)	2 (2)	Ret	1 (1)	1 (1)	1 (1)	1 (1)	1 (1)	Ret	DNS	4 (4)	8 (8)	5 (5)	100	935
4	(Papua New Guinea) Keith Kassulke	Ret	DNS	DNS	3 (3)	3 (3)	Ret	4 (4)	5 (5)	6 (6)	**2** (2)	4 (4)	3 (3)	7 (7)	5 (4)	10 (8)	**14** (10)	7 (7)	6 (6)	6 (6)	7 (7)	4 (4)	1 (1)	6 (6)	1 (1)	0	899
5	(Australia) Mark King	Ret	10 (10)	14 (11)	12 (9)	11 (9)	6 (6)	5 (5)	8 (7)	9 (8)	10 (10)	5 (5)	6 (6)	14 (12)	7 (6)	Ret	7 (7)	4 (4)	8 (8)	9 (9)	24 (15)	11 (11)	9 (9)	11 (11)	16 (11)	0	736.5
6	(Australia) Eddie Abelnica	5 (5)	2 (2)	6 (6)	Ret	10 (8)	5 (5)							5 (5)	6 (5)	DNS	6 (6)	5 (5)	9 (9)	8 (8)	1 (1)	10 (10)	2 (2)	4 (4)	2 (2)	0	702
7	(Australia) Greg Crick	11 (10)	8 (8)	4 (4)	7 (7)	7 (6)	3 (3)	2 (2)	7 (6)	4 (4)	5 (5)	Ret	DNS				Ret	11 (10)	7 (7)	Ret	14 (11)	8 (8)	5 (5)	5 (5)	7 (7)	0	699
8	(Australia) Tony Karanfilovski	12 (11)	11 (11)	13 (10)				Ret	20 (14)	13 (11)	6 (6)	Ret	5 (5)	13 (11)	9 (8)	11 (9)	4 (4)	6 (6)	5 (5)	10 (10)	10 (10)	9 (9)	10 (10)	9 (9)	Ret	0	543
9	(Australia) Wayne Mercer	15 (13)	18 (14)	18 (14)	14 (11)	13 (10)	10 (8)	14 (11)	14 (11)	17 (13)				19 (13)	19 (13)	15 (10)	16 (11)	14 (13)	13 (12)	23 (16)	19 (14)	16 (13)	13 (11)	13 (12)	13 (9)	0	506
10	(Australia) Adam Bressington	8 (8)	3 (3)	7 (7)							9 (9)	6 (6)	4 (4)	Ret	11 (9)	9 (7)	Ret	9 (9)	11 (10)	7 (7)	2 (2)	6 (6)				0	502.5
11	(Australia) Jason Gomersall	14 (12)	15 (12)	16 (12)	11 (8)	14 (11)	9 (7)	13 (10)	Ret	DNS	7 (7)	Ret	9 (9)	9 (8)	Ret	Ret	Ret	13 (12)	Ret	11 (11)	3 (3)	Ret				0	398.5
12	(Australia) Les Walmsley				6 (6)	Ret	DNS				6 (6)	Ret	2 (2)	6 (6)	3 (2)	7 (6)							6 (6)	1 (1)	DNS	0	388
13	(Australia) Brett Youlden	9 (9)	7 (7)	17 (13)																5 (5)	4 (4)	3 (3)	3 (3)	7 (7)	4 (4)	0	354.5
14	(Australia) Brad Tilley							3 (3)	4 (4)	2 (2)				12 (10)	15 (11)	6 (5)				13 (12)	8 (8)	5 (5)				0	351
15	(Australia) Gavin Bullas	7 (7)	9 (9)	9 (9)	16 (12)	9 (7)	4 (4)	6 (6)	9 (8)	11 (9)																0	327
16	(Australia) Cameron Tilley							12 (9)	13 (10)	7 (7)				4 (4)	8 (7)	4 (3)				14 (13)	9 (9)	7 (7)				0	323.5
17	(Australia) Paul Freestone	6 (6)	5 (5)	5 (5)										10 (9)	DNS	DNS	3 (3)	8 (8)	4 (4)							0	301
18	(Australia) Graham Alexander	Ret	19 (15)	21 (15)	13 (10)	Ret	DNS				13 (11)	12 (7)	12 (10)	20 (14)	18 (12)	16 (11)				17 (14)	17 (12)	20 (14)				0	280
19	(Australia) Michael Almond	4 (4)	16 (13)	8 (8)	**1** (1)	1 (1)	DNS	DNS	10 (9)	DNS																0	258
20	(Australia) Garry Treloar							18 (13)	19 (13)	12 (10)													17 (13)	16 (13)	15 (10)	0	150
21	(Australia) Stephen White																5 (5)	3 (3)	3 (3)							0	149
22	(Australia) Tony Edwards																						8 (8)	2 (2)	3 (3)	0	144
23	(Australia) Steve Makarios							DNS	21 (15)	20 (14)							13 (9)	12 (11)	12 (11)							0	122
24	(Australia) Cameron Mason							16 (12)	16 (12)	16 (12)																0	72
25	(Australia) Andrew Adams																9 (8)	Ret	18 (13)	18 (15)						0	57
26	(Australia) Glenn Seton																			4 (4)	Ret	DNS				0	24
27	(Australia) Bill Pye													8 (NC)	1 (NC)	3 (NC)				19 (NC)	15 (NC)	18 (NC)				0	0
NC	(Australia) Dean Neville													Ret	13 (10)	Ret										0	0
Class B: Pro-Sportsman
1	(Australia) Steve Mason	17 (4)	12 (1)	10 (1)	8 (1)	5 (1)	12 (3)	11 (3)	12 (3)	10 (2)	12 (2)	7 (1)	15 (5)	16 (3)	14 (3)	12 (2)	8 (1)	10 (1)	10 (1)	20 (4)	11 (1)	12 (1)	12 (2)	12 (1)	11 (3)	0	1311.5
2	(Australia) Greg Keene	10 (1)	14 (3)	11 (2)	10 (3)	8 (2)	7 (1)	9 (1)	11 (2)	Ret	11 (1)	9 (3)	10 (1)	11 (1)	10 (1)	8 (1)	10 (2)	16 (3)	15 (3)	12 (1)	12 (2)	DNS	Ret	DNS	DNS	0	1050
3	(Australia) William Vining	Ret	20 (5)	20 (6)				Ret	18 (6)	18 (5)	18 (7)	10 (4)	13 (3)	17 (4)	17 (5)	18 (6)	11 (3)	15 (2)	14 (2)	Ret	21 (6)	17 (4)	14 (3)	15 (3)	12 (4)	0	845
4	(Australia) Gary O'Brien	Ret	17 (4)	15 (4)	15 (4)	15 (4)	Ret	20 (7)	Ret	15 (4)	14 (3)	Ret	DNS	19 (5)	16 (4)	14 (4)	Ret	Ret	17 (5)	15 (2)	13 (3)	13 (2)	16 (4)	18 (5)	10 (2)	0	802
5	(Australia) Amanda Sparks							15 (4)	15 (4)	14 (3)	15 (4)	8 (2)	11 (2)	15 (2)	12 (2)	13 (3)	12 (4)	18 (5)	16 (4)	16 (3)	16 (4)	14 (3)				0	739
6	(Australia) Rory O'Neill	16 (3)	21 (6)	19 (5)				17 (5)	17 (5)	19 (6)	17 (6)	Ret	Ret	21 (6)	21 (6)	17 (5)	Ret	17 (4)	DNS	22 (6)	23 (8)	19 (5)	19 (6)	19 (6)	Ret	0	710.5
7	(Australia) Chris Stillwell				9 (2)	12 (3)	8 (2)	10 (2)	6 (1)	8 (1)							Ret	DNS	DNS				11 (1)	14 (2)	9 (1)	0	516
8	(Australia) Mick Wilson							19 (6)	Ret	Ret				22 (7)	21 (7)	Ret				Ret	20 (5)	21 (6)				0	201
9	(Australia) Leo Tobin										Ret	Ret	DNS	23 (8)	22 (8)	19 (7)				21 (5)	22 (7)	Ret	18 (5)	17 (4)	14 (5)	0	168
10	(Australia) Nigel Benson	13 (2)	13 (2)	12 (3)																						0	164
11	(Australia) Rusty French										16 (5)	11 (5)	14 (4)													0	138
12	(Australia) Andrew Adams																			18 (?)	18 (?)	15 (?)				0	117
13	(Australia) Phillip Showers																15 (5)	19 (6)	Ret							0	87
Pos.	Driver	Syd. (New South Wales)			Bar. (Western Australia)			Hid. (Northern Territory)			Que. (Queensland)			Syd. (New South Wales)			San. (Victoria (state))			Mou. (New South Wales)			Phi. (Victoria (state))			Pen.	Pts.

Colour	Result
Gold	Winner
Silver	Second place
Bronze	Third place
Green	Points classification
Blue	Non-points classification
Blue	Non-classified finish (NC)
Purple	Retired, not classified (Ret)
Red	Did not qualify (DNQ)
Red	Did not pre-qualify (DNPQ)
Black	Disqualified (DSQ)
White	Did not start (DNS)
White	Withdrew (WD)
White	Race cancelled (C)
Blank	Did not practice (DNP)
Blank	Did not arrive (DNA)
Blank	Excluded (EX)

Bold - Pole position
Italics - Fastest lap
