= 1988 Australian Manufacturers' Championship =

Seasons
- ← 1987 1989 →

The 1988 Australian Manufacturers' Championship was an Australian motor sport title authorised by the Confederation of Australian Motor Sport (CAMS) for Group 3A Touring Cars. It was the 18th circuit racing manufacturers championship to be awarded by CAMS and the ninth to be contested under the Australian Manufacturers' Championship name.

The championship was won jointly by Ford, BMW and Toyota.

== Race calendar ==
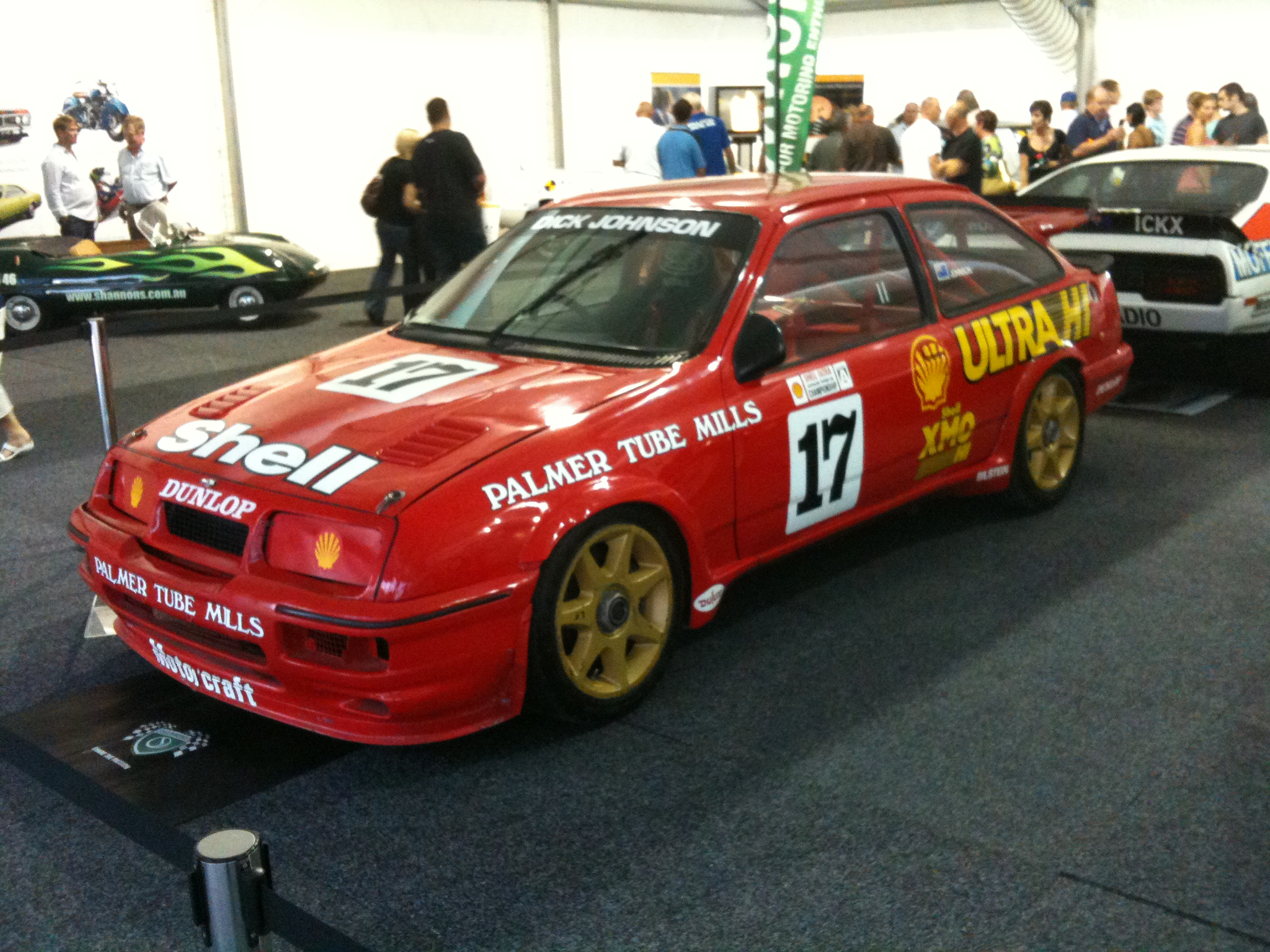
Ford was a joint winner of the title with its Sierra RS500

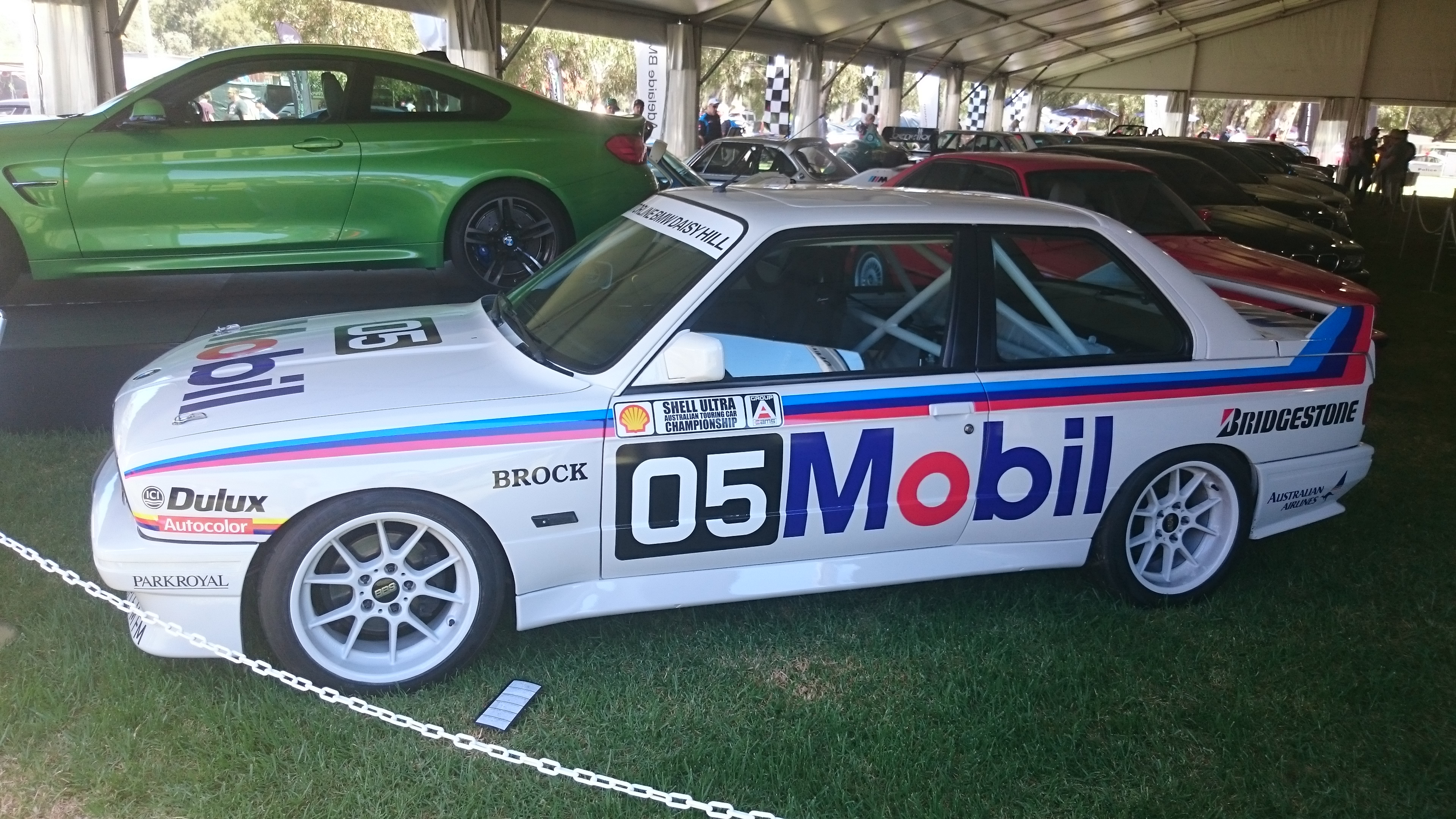
BMW was a joint winner of the title with its M3

The championship was contested over a nine-round series with rounds run concurrently with those of the 1988 Australian Touring Car Championship.

| Round | Circuit | Location / state | Date |
|---|---|---|---|
| 1 | Calder Park Raceway | Melbourne, Victoria | 6 March |
| 2 | Symmons Plains Raceway | Launceston, Tasmania | 13 March |
| 3 | Winton Motor Raceway | Benalla, Victoria | 8–10 Apr |
| 4 | Wanneroo Park | Perth, Western Australia | 22–24 Apr |
| 5 | Adelaide International Raceway | Virginia, South Australia | 29 Apr – 1 May |
| 6 | Lakeside International Raceway | Brisbane, Queensland | 20–22 May |
| 7 | Sandown Raceway | Melbourne, Victoria | 27–29 May |
| 8 | Amaroo Park | Sydney, New South Wales | 17–19 Jun |
| 9 | Oran Park Raceway | Sydney, New South Wales | 15–17 Jul |

== Classes ==
Cars competing in three displacement classes:

- Up to 2000cc
- 2001 to 3000cc
- 3001 to 6000cc

== Points system ==
Points were awarded at each round to the top six placegetters in each class on a 9,6,4,3,2,1 basis however only the best placed car of each make earned championship points. The best eight round results were retained by each manufacturer to determine final championship placings.

== Championship standings ==
| Position | Manufacturer | Car | Points |
|---|---|---|---|
| 1 | Ford | Sierra RS500 | 72 |
| 1 | Toyota | Corolla | 72 |
| 1 | BMW | M3 | 72 |
| 4 | Nissan | Gazelle; Skyline | 25 |
| 5 | Holden | VL Commodore Group A SS; VK Commodore Group A SS | 19 |
| 6 | Isuzu | Gemini ZZ | 14 |
| 7 | Mercedes-Benz | 190E | 11 |
| 8 | Mitsubishi | Starion | 1 |

== See also ==
- 1988 Australian Touring Car season
- 1988 Australian Touring Car Championship
