= 1988 Oran Park 250 =

Layout of the Oran Park Raceway (1985–2010)

The 1988 Pepsi 250 was an endurance race for Group 3A Touring Cars. The event was held over 100 laps of the 2.620 km (1.628 mi) Oran Park Raceway in Sydney, New South Wales, Australia on 28 August 1988. Total race distance was 262 km (163 mi).

The race was won by Peter Brock and Jim Richards driving their Mobil 1 Racing BMW M3. Peter Jackson Nissan drivers George Fury and Mark Skaife finished 2nd in their pole sitting Nissan Skyline HR31 GTS-R, while finishing 3rd was the outdated Mitsubishi Starion turbo of former Nissan team drivers Gary Scott and Terry Shiel.

Scott, with a point to prove after being cut from both the Nissan and Brock teams in the previous two years (despite qualifying on pole at Bathurst for Nissan in 1986 and finishing third outright with Shiel), put the Starion on the front row of the grid only 0.25 behind the Skyline, with Jim Richards qualifying the BMW a years best third, though his time was 1.13 seconds slower than Fury's pole time of 1:13.29. Fury's pole time was 1.15 seconds slower than Dick Johnson's pole time in the Australian Touring Car Championship round at the circuit just over a month earlier showing not only the cars now in endurance spec, but that the Ford Sierra RS500 was still the car to beat.

Other than Colin Bond's Caltex CXT Racing Team, most of the top Ford Sierra teams, including the Australian Touring Car Championship winning Shell team, gave the race a miss (though the Shell team had the excuse that their car and team drivers Dick Johnson and John Bowe were at the time in England preparing for the RAC Tourist Trophy race at Silverstone as part of the European Touring Car Championship the following weekend). Bond, co-driving in the race with 1980 Formula One World Champion Alan Jones, encountered engine problems with his newly built Sierra and failed to record a time in qualifying. After starting 17th and last, more engine drama after the start (including an early pit stop) saw the car only last 15 laps ending any serious challenge to the leaders. After being the dominant car of the ATCC, the first Sierra to finish was the second Caltex team car (Bond's ATCC car) driven by veterans John Giddings and Bruce Stewart who finished 17 laps down in 10th place. The only other Sierra was that of veteran Murray Carter who had abandoned his old Nissan Skyline DR30 RS to return to Ford for the first time since 1983. Partnered with Sydney's Steve Masterton, Carter's under-prepared Sierra qualified 15th (over 11 seconds slower than Fury) and lasted 26 laps before retiring with engine problems.

The race saw the Australian debut of the TWR developed Holden VL Commodore SS Group A SV in the hands of Sydney-based privateer Garry Willmington. The hurried effort by Willmington to get the car to the race showed with the former Jaguar driver qualifying 14th (11.42 seconds behind Fury), before being retired with terminal engine trouble after only 4 laps.

== Results ==
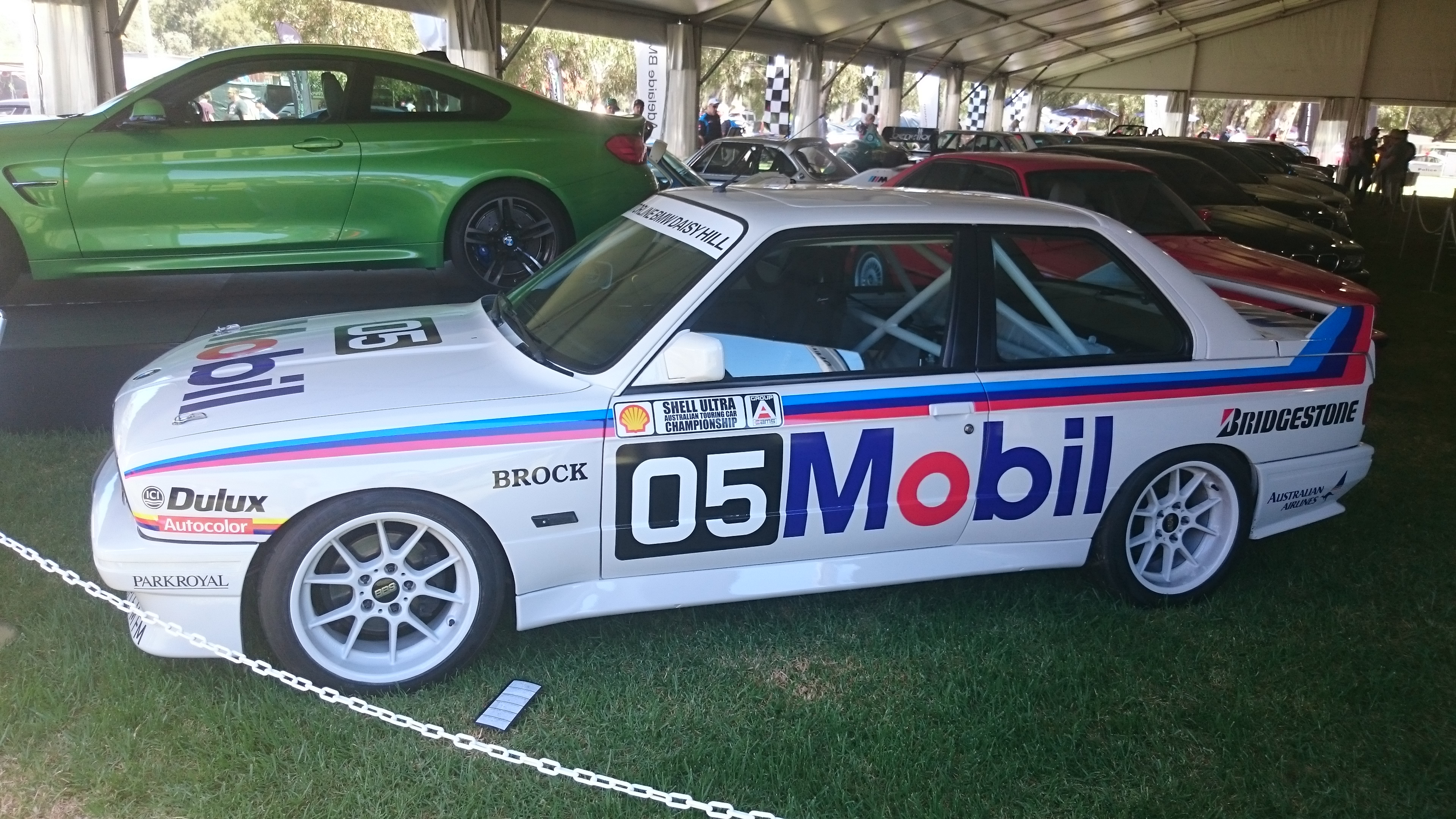
Peter Brock and Jim Richards won the race driving a BMW M3. Image from 2016.

Results were as follows:

Pos	Class	No	Entrant	Drivers	Car	Laps	Qual Pos	Qual Time
1	B	05	Mobil 1 Racing	(Australia) Peter Brock (New Zealand) Jim Richards	BMW M3	100	3	1:14.42
2	A	30	Peter Jackson Nissan Racing	(Australia) George Fury (Australia) Mark Skaife	Nissan Skyline HR31 GTS-R	100	1	1:13.29
3	A	16	Ralliart Australia	(Australia) Gary Scott (Australia) Terry Shiel	Mitsubishi Starion turbo	98	2	1:13.54
4	B	7	Mobil 1 Racing	(Australia) David Parsons (Australia) Neil Crompton	BMW M3	97	4	1:14.89
5	A	8	Wayne Park	(Australia) Wayne Park (Australia) Bob Tindall	Holden VL Commodore SS Group A	94	7	1:16.89
6	A	42	Hella Australia	(Australia) Matt Wacker (Australia) Larry Kogge	Nissan Skyline DR30 RS	93	10	1:19.27
7	A	21	Craig Kinmonth	(Australia) Craig Kinmonth (Australia) Alf Grant	Holden VK Commodore SS Group A	92	9	1:18.67
8	C	51	Bob Holden	(Australia) Dennis Rogers (Australia) Garry Jones	Toyota Sprinter	89	13	1:24.23
9	C	79	Toddies Tyres	(Australia) Bryan Selby (Australia) Mike Birks	Toyota Sprinter	87	16	1:25.17
10	A	4	Caltex CXT Racing	(Australia) John Giddings (Australia) Bruce Stewart	Ford Sierra RS500	83	6	1:16.46
11	A	6	The Xerox Shop	(Australia) Scotty Taylor (Australia) Kevin Kennedy	Mitsubishi Starion turbo	83	12	1:22.98
12	A	87	Sommariva Concrete	(Australia) Joe Sommariva (Australia) Warren McKellar (Australia) Darrel Belsky	BMW 635 CSi	59	11	1:20.94
DNF	A	14	Netcomm Australia	(Australia) Murray Carter (Australia) Steve Masterton	Ford Sierra RS500	26	15	1:24.92
DNF	A	47	Brian Callaghan	(Australia) Brian Callaghan (Australia) Graham Moore	Holden VK Commodore SS Group A	21	5	1:15.60
DNF	B	48	John Sax	(New Zealand) John Sorrenson (New Zealand) Kayne Scott	BMW M3	17	8	1:18.26
DNF	A	2	Caltex CXT Racing	(Australia) Colin Bond (Australia) Alan Jones	Ford Sierra RS500	15	17	DNP
DNF	A	40	Garry Willmington	(Australia) Garry Willmington (Australia) John Leeson	Holden VL Commodore SS Group A SV	4	14	1:24.71

== Statistics ==
- Pole position - 1:13.29 - #30 George Fury
- Fastest lap - 1:14.87 - #30 George Fury
- Race time of winning car - 2h 07m 10.71s

== See also ==
1988 Australian Touring Car season
