= 1988 Australian Touring Car season =

Seasons
- ← 1987 1989 →

The 1988 Australian Touring Car season was the 29th year of touring car racing in Australia since the first runnings of the Australian Touring Car Championship and the fore-runner of the present day Bathurst 1000, the Armstrong 500.

There were 16 touring car race meetings held during 1988; a nine-round series, the 1988 Australian Touring Car Championship (ATCC); the four round Amaroo Park based AMSCAR series (Round 3 doubled as Round 8 of the ATCC); a support programme event at the 1988 Australian Grand Prix and three long-distance races, nicknamed 'enduros'.

== Results and standings ==
=== Race calendar ===
The 1988 Australian touring car season consisted of 16 events.

Date	Series / race name	Circuit	City / state	Winner	Team	Car	Report
6 March	ATCC Round 1	Calder Park Raceway	Melbourne, Victoria	Dick Johnson	Shell Ultra-Hi Racing	Ford Sierra RS500	
13 March	ATCC Round 2	Symmons Plains Raceway	Launceston, Tasmania	Dick Johnson	Shell Ultra-Hi Racing	Ford Sierra RS500	
27 March	AMSCAR Round 1	Amaroo Park	Sydney, New South Wales	Colin Bond	Caltex CXT Racing Team	Ford Sierra RS500	
10 April	ATCC Round 3	Winton Motor Raceway	Benalla, Victoria	John Bowe	Shell Ultra-Hi Racing	Ford Sierra RS500	
24 April	ATCC Round 4	Barbagallo Raceway	Perth, Western Australia	Dick Johnson	Shell Ultra-Hi Racing	Ford Sierra RS500	
1 May	ATCC Round 5	Adelaide International Raceway	Adelaide, South Australia	Dick Johnson	Shell Ultra-Hi Racing	Ford Sierra RS500	
15 May	AMSCAR Round 2	Amaroo Park	Sydney, New South Wales	Dick Johnson	Shell Ultra-Hi Racing	Ford Sierra RS500	
22 May	ATCC Round 6	Lakeside International Raceway	Brisbane, Queensland	Tony Longhurst	Freeport Motorsport	Ford Sierra RS500	
29 May	ATCC Round 7	Sandown Raceway	Melbourne, Victoria	Dick Johnson	Shell Ultra-Hi Racing	Ford Sierra RS500	
19 June	ATCC Round 8 AMSCAR Round 3	Amaroo Park	Sydney, New South Wales	John Bowe	Shell Ultra-Hi Racing	Ford Sierra RS500	
17 July	ATCC Round 9	Oran Park Raceway	Sydney, New South Wales	Dick Johnson	Shell Ultra-Hi Racing	Ford Sierra RS500	
31 July	AMSCAR Round 4	Amaroo Park	Sydney, New South Wales	Tony Longhurst	Freeport Motorsport	Ford Sierra RS500	
28 Aug	Pepsi 250	Oran Park Raceway	Sydney, New South Wales	Peter Brock; Jim Richards	Mobil 1 Racing	BMW M3	report
11 Sep	Enzed Sandown 500	Sandown Raceway	Melbourne, Victoria	Allan Moffat; Gregg Hansford	Allan Moffat Enterprises	Ford Sierra RS500	report
2 Oct	Tooheys 1000	Mount Panorama Circuit	Bathurst, New South Wales	Tony Longhurst; Tomas Mezera	Benson & Hedges Racing	Ford Sierra RS500	report
12 Nov	South Australia Cup	Adelaide Street Circuit	Adelaide, South Australia	Larry Perkins	Holden Special Vehicles	Holden VL Commodore SS Group A SV	

=== South Australia Cup ===
This race was a support event at the 1988 Australian Grand Prix meeting. This was Larry Perkins' first win in Australia since the 1984 Bathurst 1000 and also the only Holden win for the year. This would be the final time that the touring cars would only have a single race at the Australian Grand Prix. Starting in 1989, the tourers would have one race on the Saturday afternoon following the Formula One final qualifying session with a second race the following morning on F1 race day.

Pos.	Driver	No.	Team	Car	Grid
1	(Australia) Larry Perkins	10	Holden Special Vehicles	Holden VL Commodore SS Group A SV	4
2	(New Zealand) Denny Hulme	11	Holden Special Vehicles	Holden VL Commodore SS Group A SV	7
3	(Australia) Colin Bond	4	Caltex CXT Racing	Ford Sierra RS500	5
4	(Australia) Peter Brock	05	Mobil 1 Racing	BMW M3	10
5	(Australia) Garry Rogers	33	Garry Rogers Motorsport	Holden VL Commodore SS Group A SV	15
6	(Australia) Gerald Kay	24	Jagparts	Holden VK Commodore SS Group A	18
7	(Australia) George Fury	30	Peter Jackson Nissan Racing	Nissan Skyline HR31 GTS-R	8
8	(Australia) John Farrell	52	John Farrell	Holden VL Commodore SS Group A	27
9	(New Zealand) John Faulkner	71	Toyota Team Australia	Toyota Corolla GT	25
10	(Australia) Lawrie Nelson	28	Capri Components	Ford Mustang GT	20
