= 1988 Australian Touring Car Championship =

Motor racing competition

Seasons
- ← 1987 1989 →

The 1988 Australian Touring Car Championship (promoted as the Shell Ultra Australian Touring Car Championship due to sponsorship from Shell Australia) was a CAMS sanctioned motor racing title for drivers of Group 3A Touring Cars. It was the 29th running of the Australian Touring Car Championship. The championship began on 6 March at Calder Park Raceway and ended on 17 July at Oran Park Raceway after nine rounds.

The championship was won by Dick Johnson driving a Ford Sierra RS500.

The 1988 Australian Manufacturers' Championship was contested over the same nine round series. Points were awarded only for class placings and each manufacturer could count only its best eight round results. The title was shared by Ford, which won the 3001 to 6000cc class in all nine rounds, BMW, which won the 2001 to 3000cc class in eight rounds, and Toyota, which won the Up to 2000cc class in every round.

== Season summary ==
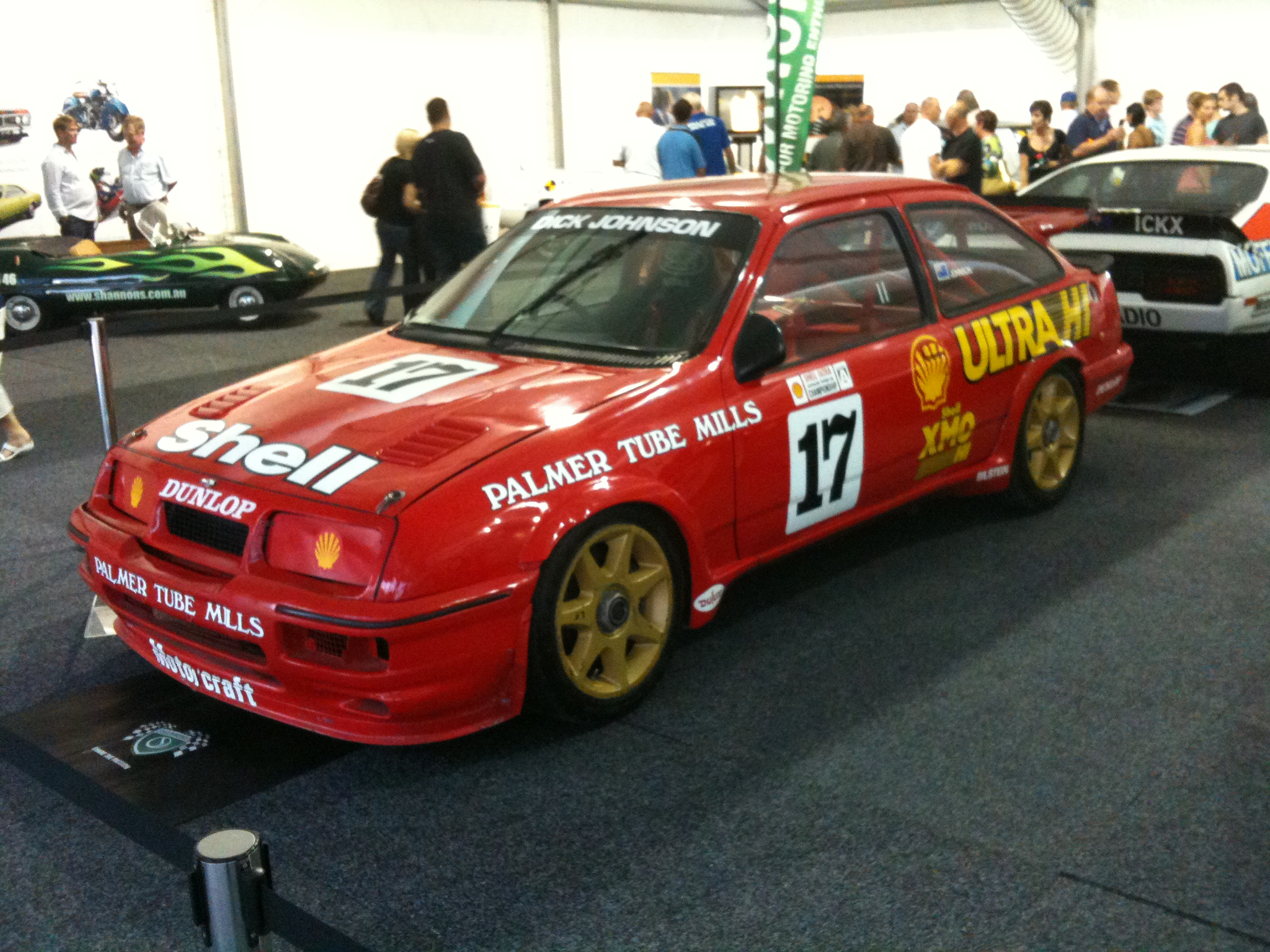
Dick Johnson won the championship driving a Ford Sierra RS500, similar to the example pictured above in 2010

The championship was dominated by those driving the Ford Sierra RS500, specifically the Shell Ultra-Hi Racing Sierras of Dick Johnson and John Bowe. Between them the pair won eight of the nine rounds with team owner Johnson winning his 4th touring car championship. Tony Longhurst was the only other driver to win a round in his Freeport Racing Sierra. Longhurst won Round 6 at Lakeside from Johnson after Dick was penalised 1 minute for jumping the start.

With Sierras winning each round of the championship, 1988 was the first time since the Holden Torana A9Xs of 1979 that a single model car had won each round of the championship. Up to and including the 2016 V8 Supercar Championship Series, such single model domination has not been seen since in Australian touring car racing.

Due to the speed and increased reliability of the near 500 bhp (373 kW; 507 PS) turbocharged Sierras, the 300 bhp (224 kW; 304 PS), 2.3 L, Naturally aspirated BMW M3, now being run by Peter Brock's Mobil 1 Racing was reduced to a class car rather than the outright winner it was in 1987. Defending champion Jim Richards, new to the Mobil team in 1988 (though he had previously driven for the team as Brock's winning co driver at Bathurst from 1978 to 1981 when it was known as the Holden Dealer Team), had a best finish of 3rd at Winton, while Brock could finish no higher than 4th in the dry-wet-dry round at Wanneroo Park despite being one of the few drivers to remain on slicks after the rain caused mayhem and mid-race restart. Unfortunately for the Mobil team, the advantage the M3s had in both handling and brakes was not enough to combat the outright power of the Sierras.

After two seasons with the old Skyline DR30 RS, Nissan debuted their new turbocharged, Straight-6, Skyline HR31 GTS-R for 1987 drivers Glenn Seton and George Fury and were expected to challenge the Sierras. However, the team's testing and development of the GTS-R was in the races due to the late arrival of parts from Japan and the 400 bhp (298 kW; 406 PS) cars did not have the speed or reliability of the Fords with a best finish of 3rd for Fury at Amaroo Park. Unfortunately for Fred Gibson's team, the Australian racing program had fallen behind both the Japanese domestic scene as well as the European Touring Car Championship (ETCC) campaign run by Howard Marsden in importance to Nismo in 1988 and as such the Gibson Team had a late arrival for their cars and did not appear until Round 5 in Adelaide with a single car for Fury (to keep his eye in, Seton actually drove a Nissan powered Ralt RT4 in a one-off appearance and won the Adelaide round of the Australian Drivers' Championship that weekend). Other problems for the new Skyline turbos included the cars being approximately 70 kg (150 lb) over their homologated 1,100 kg (2,400 lb) weight, a production rather than racing (Getrag) gear box which developed a bad habit of locking in gear under the greater stress of racing, as well as the straight rather than V6 engine which, with two of the six cylinders being over the front axle caused understeer (similar to the old BMW 635) which the team took some time to overcome. After Adelaide, Fury and Seton then alternated drives in the team's car until a second Skyline appeared at the penultimate round at Amaroo. Fury then stepped aside at the final round at Oran Park to allow 1987 Australian 2.0 Litre Champion Mark Skaife to drive in his ATCC debut. Seton, who had finished second in the 1987 ATCC, would finish the series in 15th place while Fury fared marginally better finishing 13th.

Delays in the building of the new fuel injected Holden VL Commodore SS Group A SV also saw to it that the factory Holden challenge, headed by Larry Perkins and his team in the 1987 model 'HDT' VL with backing from Holden Special Vehicles, was almost non-existent. Perkins best finish was 3rd at Sandown in Round 7, greatly helped by the number of retirements from the front running Sierras and the still bug riddled Nissan driven that weekend by Fury. Although supported by numerous privateer Commodores (most of whom were driving customer cars built by Perkins Engineering), Perkins played virtually a lone hand for Holden as regular Commodore racer Allan Grice (Roadways) was racing a GTS-R for Nissan in the ETCC and Brock was now racing for BMW. Although the Commodore was producing approximately 450 bhp (336 kW; 456 PS) from its V8 engine, as usual its weight (1,325 kg (2,921 lb), over 200 more than the Sierra and Nissan and around 350 more than the BMW's) saw the big car unable to live with the lighter turbocharged Sierra's, the short of development Skylines and the nimble M3's in the shorter races on the tighter tracks used in the championship with tyres and brakes being the usual issues. Perkins' own retirement in 3 of the 8 rounds also killed any chance of a Holden driver taking the series from the all-conquering Fords.

1988 saw the last ever ATCC race held at the 2.41 km (1.50 mi) Adelaide International Raceway (AIR), which had held at least one round of the series every year since the circuit opened in 1972, with victory predictably going to the Ford Sierra RS500 of Dick Johnson (with John Bowe finishing 2nd it was the Shell Team's third 1–2 in just 5 rounds). From 1989, the South Australian round of the series would be held at the track AIR replaced on the ATCC calendar in 1972, Mallala Motor Sport Park.

The year also saw four-time champion Allan Moffat return to the series for the first time since 1984. Moffat had managed to convince Ruedi Eggenberger to build him a customer Sierra RS500 to run in Australia. With sponsorship from ANZ Bank, Allan Moffat Racing joined the series from Round 4 at Wanneroo Park. Running a conservative program while his team learned about the Sierra, Moffat did not have the pace of the Johnson cars, or the Sierras of Tony Longhurst, Andrew Miedecke and Colin Bond (who was racing in the outright category of the ATCC for the first time since 1978). Moffat's best finish was third in Round 6 at Lakeside. Despite the disqualification of the Eggenberger Sierras at the 1987 James Hardie 1000, Moffat had no problems with scrutineering, unlike 1986 ATCC champion Robbie Francevic whose Sierra, built in West Germany by Walter Wolf Racing, raced under protest in Round 3 at Winton before the car was ruled illegal before the start of practice for Round 5 at Adelaide. Although Francevic contended his car was legal, they were his only appearances in the championship.

== Teams and drivers ==
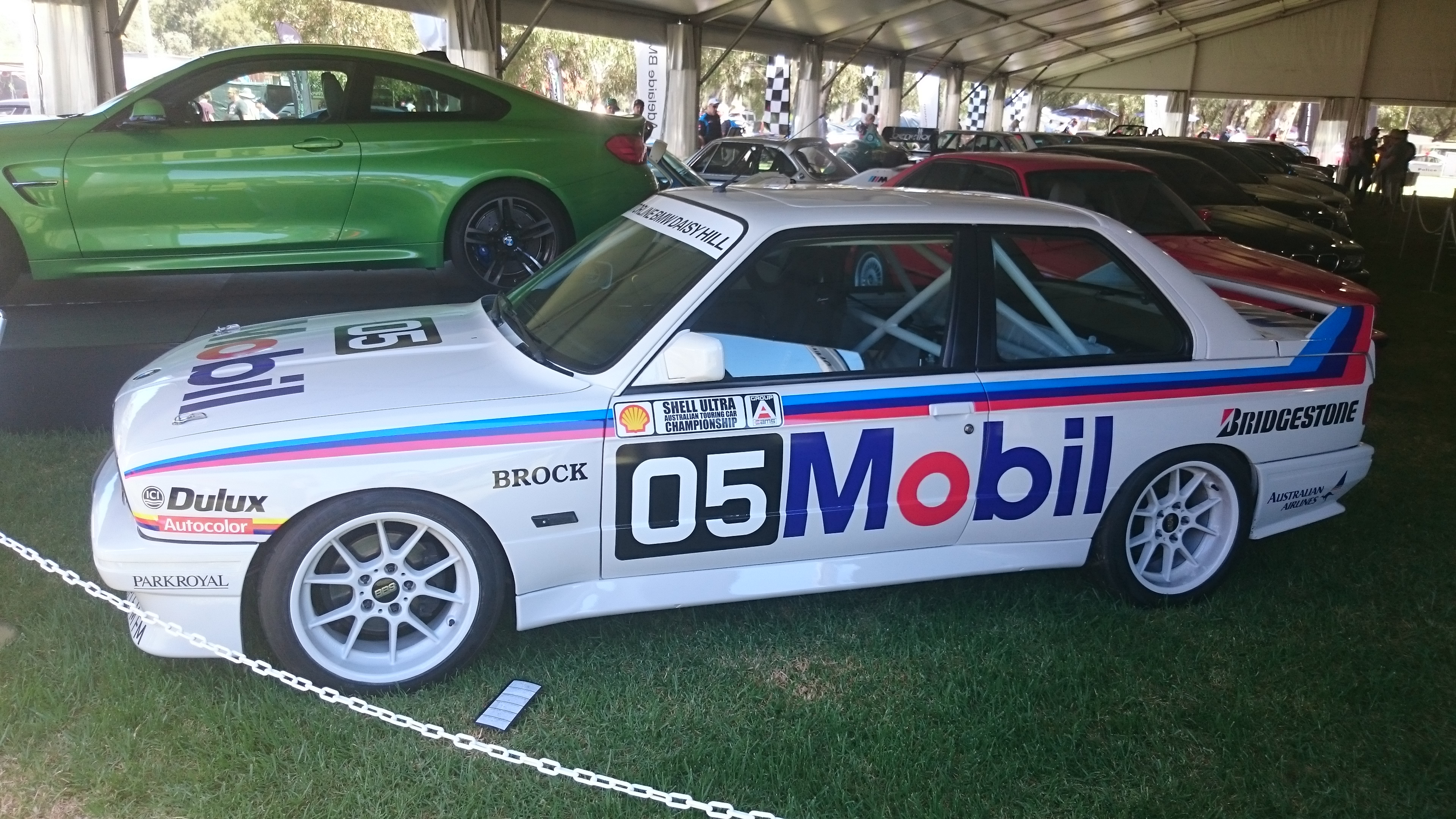
Peter Brock placed sixth driving a BMW M3

The following drivers and teams competed in the 1988 Australian Touring Car Championship.

Team	Car	No	Driver	Rounds
Mobil 1 Racing	BMW M3	1	(New Zealand) Jim Richards	1, 3–9
Mobil 1 Racing	BMW M3	1	(Australia) David Parsons	2
Mobil 1 Racing	BMW M3	05	(Australia) Peter Brock	All
Mobil 1 Racing	BMW M3	7	(Australia) Neil Crompton	8–9
Freeport Motorsport	Ford Sierra RS500	3	(Australia) Tony Longhurst	All
Caltex CXT Racing Team	Ford Sierra RS500	4	(Australia) Colin Bond	All
Miedecke Motorsport	Ford Sierra RS500	6	(Australia) Andrew Miedecke	All
Miedecke Motorsport	Ford Sierra RS500	8	(New Zealand) Andrew Bagnall	All
Allan Moffat Racing	Ford Sierra RS500	9	(Canada) Allan Moffat	4–8
Allan Moffat Racing	Ford Sierra RS500	9	(Australia) Gregg Hansford	9
Holden Special Vehicles	Holden VL Commodore SS Group A	11	(Australia) Larry Perkins	All
Peter McLeod	Holden VL Commodore SS Group A	12	(Australia) Peter McLeod	1–5
Bob Holden Motors	Toyota Sprinter AE86	13	(Australia) Bob Holden	1–3, 5
Bob Holden Motors	Toyota Sprinter AE86	51	(Australia) Dennis Rogers	8–9
Netcomm Australia	Nissan Skyline DR30 RS	14	(Australia) Murray Carter	2–5, 7–8
Netcomm Australia	Ford Sierra RS500	14	(Australia) Murray Carter	9
Peter Jackson Nissan Racing	Nissan Skyline HR31 GTS-R	15	(Australia) Glenn Seton	8–9
Peter Jackson Nissan Racing	Nissan Skyline HR31 GTS-R	30	(Australia) George Fury	5–9
Peter Jackson Nissan Racing	Nissan Skyline HR31 GTS-R	30	(Australia) Mark Skaife	
Ralliart Australia	Mitsubishi Starion turbo	16	(Australia) Gary Scott	5–6, 8–9
Shell Ultra-Hi Racing	Ford Sierra RS500	17	(Australia) Dick Johnson	All
Shell Ultra-Hi Racing	Ford Sierra RS500	18	(Australia) John Bowe	All
Terry Finnigan	Holden VL Commodore SS Group A	20	(Australia) Terry Finnigan	8
Craig Kinmoth	Holden VK Commodore SS Group A	21	(Australia) Craig Kinmoth	6
Lusty Engineering	Holden VL Commodore SS Group A	22	(Australia) Graham Lusty	1, 3, 5, 7, 9
Peter Fitzgerald	Holden VK Commodore SS Group A	23	(Australia) Peter Fitzgerald	2
Jagparts	Holden VK Commodore SS Group A	24	(Australia) Gerald Kay	All
Robbie Francevic	Ford Sierra RS500	25	(New Zealand) Robbie Francevic	3, 5
Kalari Transport Services	Holden VK Commodore SS Group A	26	(Australia) Tony Noske	1–7
Ray Gulson	BMW 635 CSi	27	(Australia) Ray Gulson	1–5
Ray Gulson	BMW 635 CSi	27	(Australia) Graham Gulson	
Capri Components	Ford Mustang GT	28	(Australia) Lawrie Nelson	1, 3, 5, 7
Toyota Team Australia	Toyota Corolla	29	(New Zealand) John Faulkner	3, 5–9
Toyota Team Australia	Toyota Corolla	31	(Australia) John Smith	5–8
Toyota Team Australia	Toyota Corolla	32	(Australia) Drew Price	1–7
Ian Love	Ford Mustang GT	31	(Australia) Ian Love	1, 3–4
Colin Fulton	Nissan Gazelle	33	(Australia) Colin Fulton	1–3, 5
Phil Ward Racing	Mercedes-Benz 190 E	34	(Australia) Phil Ward	3, 6, 9
Phil Ward Racing	Mercedes-Benz 190 E	35	Llynden Reithmuller	6
Everlast Battery Service	Holden VL Commodore SS Group A	36	(Australia) Bill O'Brien	1–2, 6–7, 9
Wayne Clift	Holden VK Commodore SS Group A	38	(Australia) Wayne Clift	6
Lansvale Racing Team	Holden VL Commodore SS Group A	39	(Australia) Steve Reed	5–6, 9
Lansvale Racing Team	Holden VL Commodore SS Group A	39	(Australia) Trevor Ashby	8
John Leeson	Holden VL Commodore SS Group A	40	(Australia) John Leeson	5
Steve Williams	Holden VK Commodore SS Group A	42	(Australia) Steve Williams	6–9
Tony Mulvihill	Holden VK Commodore SS Group A	44	(Australia) Tony Mulvihill	1, 5, 7
Lester Smerdon	Holden VK Commodore SS Group A	45	(Australia) Lester Smerdon	6
Sunline Caravans	Holden VK Commodore SS Group A	46	(Australia) Tony Hunter	1–3, 7
Brian Callaghan	Holden VK Commodore SS Group A	47	(Australia) Brian Callaghan	8–9
Brian Callaghan	Holden VK Commodore SS Group A	47	(Australia) Barry Graham	
Wayne Park	Holden VL Commodore SS Group A	48	(Australia) Wayne Park	6, 8
John Farrell	Holden VK Commodore SS Group A	52	(Australia) John Farrell	4
Paul Trevathan	Mitsubishi Starion	69	(Australia) Paul Trevathan	3, 8
Graeme Hooley	Holden VK Commodore SS Group A	71	(Australia) Graeme Hooley	4
Murphy Johnson Imported Cars	Alfa Romeo 75 Turbo	75	(Australia) Gerard Murphy	1, 8
Brian Bolwell	BMW 323i	78	(Australia) Brian Bolwell	3, 7
Marc Ducquet	Toyota Sprinter AE86	79	(Australia) Marc Ducquet	8–9
Ian Mayberry	BMW 323i	80	(Australia) Ian Mayberry	
Gemspares	Isuzu Gemini ZZ	86	(Australia) Daryl Hendrick	1–5, 7, 9
Joe Sommariva	BMW 635 CSi	87	(Australia) Joe Sommariva	1–2, 5, 7–8
David Sala	Isuzu Gemini PF60	88	(Australia) David Sala	1
David Sala	Isuzu Gemini PF60	88	(Australia) David Smart	7
Ray Lintott	Toyota Corolla	89	(Australia) Ray Lintott	9

== Race calendar ==
The 1988 Australian Touring Car Championship was contested over a nine-round series with each round being a single race of just under one hour in duration. This would be the 15th and last time the Adelaide International Raceway hosted an ATCC race having first hosted a round in 1972.

Rd.	Race title	Circuit	Location / state	Date	Winner	Car	Team	Report
1	Calder Park	Calder Park Raceway	Melbourne, Victoria	6 March	(Australia) Dick Johnson	Ford Sierra RS500	Shell Ultra-Hi Racing	
2	Symmons Plains	Symmons Plains Raceway	Launceston, Tasmania	13 March	(Australia) Dick Johnson	Ford Sierra RS500	Shell Ultra-Hi Racing	
3	Winton	Winton Motor Raceway	Benalla, Victoria	10 April	(Australia) John Bowe	Ford Sierra RS500	Shell Ultra-Hi Racing	
4	Wanneroo Park	Wanneroo Park	Perth, Western Australia	24 April	(Australia) Dick Johnson	Ford Sierra RS500	Shell Ultra-Hi Racing	
5	Adelaide	Adelaide International Raceway	Virginia, South Australia	1 May	(Australia) Dick Johnson	Ford Sierra RS500	Shell Ultra-Hi Racing	
6	Lakeside	Lakeside International Raceway	Brisbane, Queensland	22 May	(Australia) Tony Longhurst	Ford Sierra RS500	Freeport Motorsport	
7	Sandown	Sandown Raceway	Melbourne, Victoria	29 May	(Australia) Dick Johnson	Ford Sierra RS500	Shell Ultra-Hi Racing	
8	Amaroo Park	Amaroo Park	Sydney, New South Wales	19 June	(Australia) John Bowe	Ford Sierra RS500	Shell Ultra-Hi Racing	
9	Oran Park	Oran Park Raceway	Sydney, New South Wales	17 July	(Australia) Dick Johnson	Ford Sierra RS500	Shell Ultra-Hi Racing	

== Points system ==
Points were awarded on a 20–15–12–10–8–6–4–3–2–1 basis for the top ten race positions at each round. Only the best eight results could be retained by each driver.

== Championship standings ==
Pos.	Driver	Car	Cal.	Sym.	Win.	Wan.	Ade.	Lak.	San.	Ama.	Ora.	Pts
1	Dick Johnson	Ford Sierra RS500	1st	1st	Ret	1st	1st	2nd	1st	2nd	1st	150
2	John Bowe	Ford Sierra RS500	Ret	2nd	1st	3rd	2nd	Ret	2nd	1st	2nd	112
3	Colin Bond	Ford Sierra RS500	3rd	3rd	2nd	2nd	3rd	Ret	Ret	13th	4th	76
4	Jim Richards	BMW M3	DSQ		3rd	5th	5th	7th	5th	4th	5th	58
5	Tony Longhurst	Ford Sierra RS500	2nd	4th	DNS	Ret	Ret	1st	Ret	Ret	9th	47
6	Peter Brock	BMW M3	DSQ	5th	7th	4th	6th	5th	13th	5th	8th	47
7	Larry Perkins	Holden VL Commodore SS Group A	4th	Ret	Ret	6th	8th	4th	3rd	7th	Ret	45
8	Andrew Miedecke	Ford Sierra RS500	5th	Ret	Ret	Ret	4th	6th	Ret	Ret	3rd	36
9	Allan Moffat	Ford Sierra RS500				Ret	7th	3rd	4th	6th	14th	32
10	Andrew Bagnall	Ford Sierra RS500	6th	11th	4th	Ret	Ret	9th	6th	Ret	10th	25
11	Murray Carter	Nissan Skyline DR30 RS & Ford Sierra RS500	7th	8th	5th	9th	9th		10th	12th	25th	20
12	Tony Noske	Holden VK Commodore SS Group A	8th	7th	8th	7th	13th		7th			18
13	George Fury	Nissan Skyline HR31 GTS-R					Ret		8th	3rd		15
14	Graham Gulson	BMW 635 CSi			6th		11th					6
15	Glenn Seton	Nissan Skyline HR31 GTS-R						Ret		Ret	6th	6
15	David Parsons	BMW M3		6th								6
17	Peter McLeod	Holden VL Commodore SS Group A	9th	Ret	Ret	8th	15th					5
18	Gary Scott	Mitsubishi Starion					Ret	Ret		Ret	7th	4
19	Bill O'Brien	Holden VL Commodore SS Group A	11th	9th				12th	9th		13th	4
20	Neil Crompton	BMW M3								8th	11th	3
21	Steve Reed	Holden VL Commodore SS Group A					Ret	8th			16th	3
22	Graham Lusty	Holden VL Commodore SS Group A	13th		9th		10th		11th		22nd	3
23	Gerald Kay	Holden VK Commodore SS Group A	15th	10th	10th	10th			12th	Ret	18th	3
24	Brian Callaghan	Holden VK Commodore SS Group A								9th		2
25	Phil Ward	Mercedes-Benz 190 E			11th			10th				1
25	Wayne Park	Holden VL Commodore SS Group A						11th		10th		1
27	Tony Mulvihill	Holden VK Commodore SS Group A	10th				12th					1
Pos.	Driver	Car	Cal.	Sym.	Win.	Wan.	Ade.	Lak.	San.	Ama.	Ora.	Pts

Colour	Result
Gold	Winner
Silver	Second place
Bronze	Third place
Green	Points classification
Blue	Non-points classification
Blue	Non-classified finish (NC)
Purple	Retired, not classified (Ret)
Red	Did not qualify (DNQ)
Red	Did not pre-qualify (DNPQ)
Black	Disqualified (DSQ)
White	Did not start (DNS)
White	Withdrew (WD)
White	Race cancelled (C)
Blank	Did not practice (DNP)
Blank	Did not arrive (DNA)
Blank	Excluded (EX)

== See also ==
- 1988 Australian Touring Car season
- 1988 Australian Manufacturers' Championship
