= Holden Commodore (VL) =

Australian mid-size car

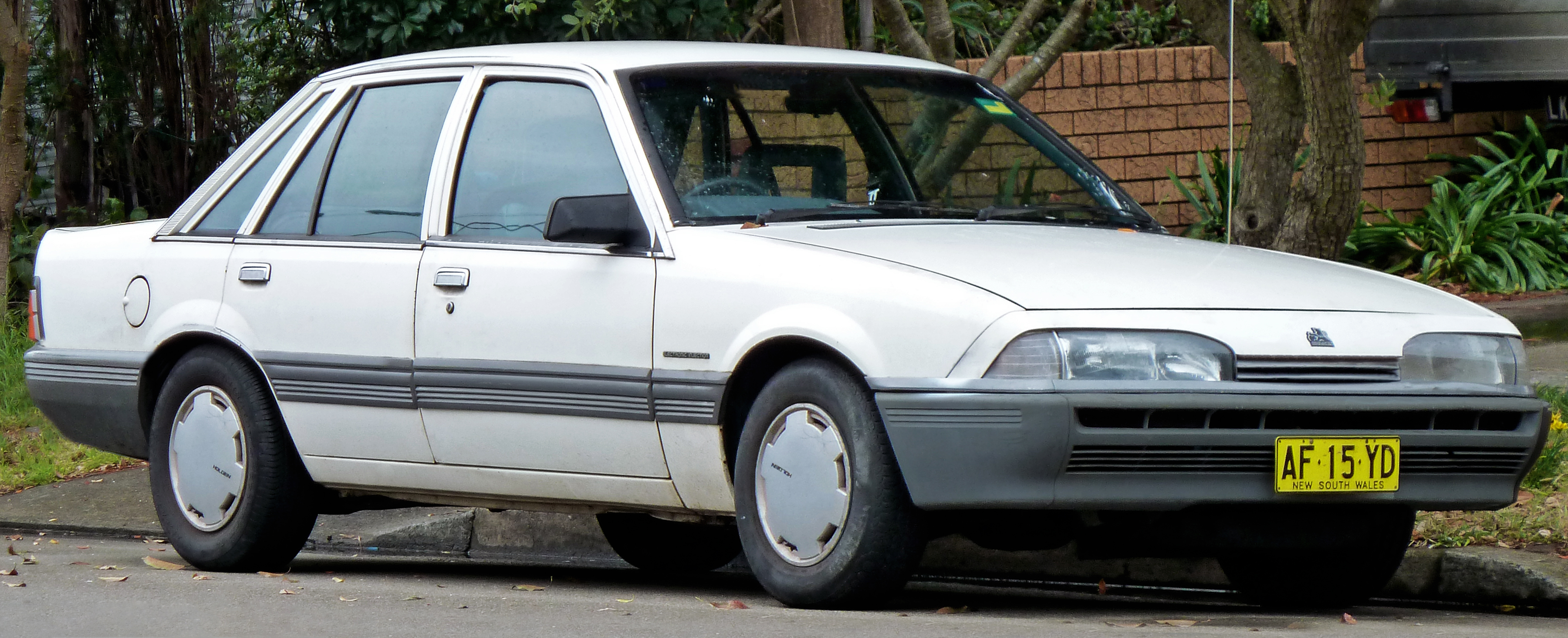
- 1986 Holden Commodore (VL) Executive sedan

Overview
- Manufacturer: Holden (General Motors)
- Also called: Holden Calais (VL)
- Production: February 1986 – August 1988
- Assembly: Australia: Adelaide, South Australia (Elizabeth), Melbourne, Victoria (Dandenong); New Zealand: Wellington (Trentham); Indonesia: Surabaya (PT. Udatin)

Body and chassis
- Class: Mid-size
- Body style: 4-door sedan 5-door station wagon
- Layout: Front-engine, rear-wheel-drive
- Platform: GM V platform
- Related: Opel Rekord E Opel Senator

Powertrain
- Engine: 2.0 L RB20E I6 (New Zealand, Southeast Asia); 3.0 L RB30E I6 (Australia, New Zealand); 3.0 L RB30ET I6 (Australia); 5.0 L Holden V8 engine (Australia, New Zealand)
- Transmission: 5-speed manual 3-speed automatic 4-speed automatic

Dimensions
- Wheelbase: 2,668 mm (105.0 in)
- Length: 4,766 mm (187.6 in)
- Width: 1,722 mm (67.8 in)
- Height: 1,363–1,368 mm (53.7–53.9 in)
- Kerb weight: 1,250–1,350 kg (2,760–2,980 lb)

Chronology
- Predecessor: Holden Commodore (VK)
- Successor: Holden Commodore (VN)

The Holden Commodore (VL) is a mid-size car that was produced by Holden from 1986 to 1988. It was the final iteration of the first generation of the Holden Commodore and included the luxury variant, Holden Calais (VL). Between February 1986 and August 1988, 151,801 VL model Commodores were built.

== Design and development ==
The VL Commodore represented a substantial makeover of the VK, and would be the last of the mid-size Commodores until 2018.

The designers sought to soften the lines for the VL, rounding off the panels and introducing a small tail spoiler built into the boot lid. Holden also implemented lower profile rectangular headlamps as opposed to the taller squarer style of lights fitted to the earlier models. The top-of-the-range Calais model incorporated semi-retracting covers over headlights identical to those on other VL Commodores. This was a first for Holden, though the never-released Torana GTR-X featured fully retractable headlights.

Major changes were made to the dashboard with new instruments, touch switches mounted either side controlling wipers, rear window demister, electric antenna (Berlina/Calais), and the headlight switch moved from the right-hand dash side to the indicator stalk. Heating, ventilation, and air-conditioning control graphics changed slightly, the centre console offered more storage with new transmission shifter and surround.

== Powertrains ==
=== Straight-six engine ===
The Black engine was dropped in favour of an imported 3.0-litre RB30E straight-six unit designed and manufactured by Nissan in Japan. The reason for the Nissan-Holden combination was because all cars manufactured in Australia from 1 January 1986 had to run on unleaded 91 octane fuel. The previous six-cylinder Black motor was unable to do this, nor was the V8, hence the later release date of this engine. As the tooling for the Holden straight-six engine had become worn by this stage, it also was not considered cost-effective to adapt the design to unleaded petrol. The new engines included features such as an Electronic Combustion Control System (ECCS) and a ram-tuned intake manifold.

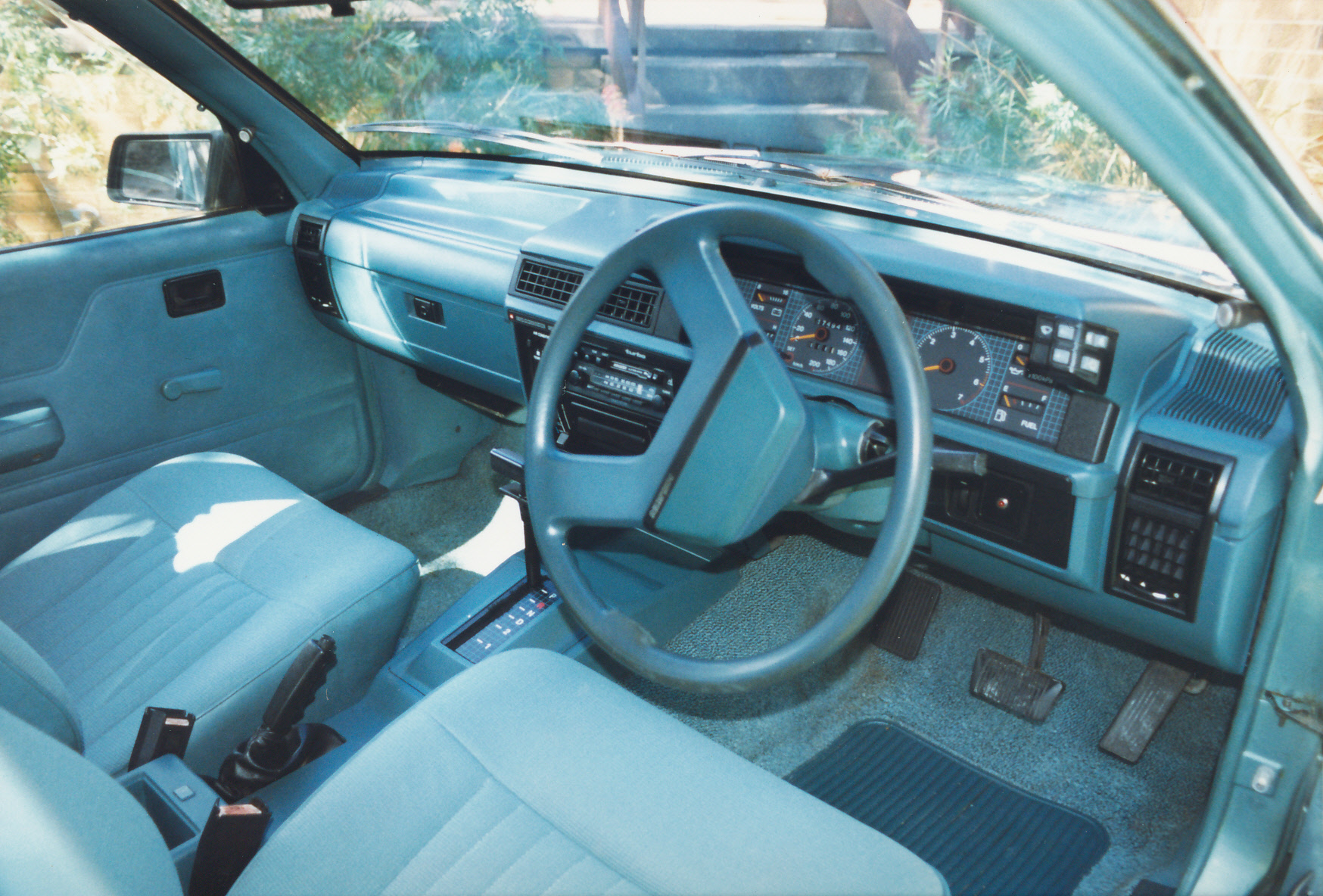
Interior

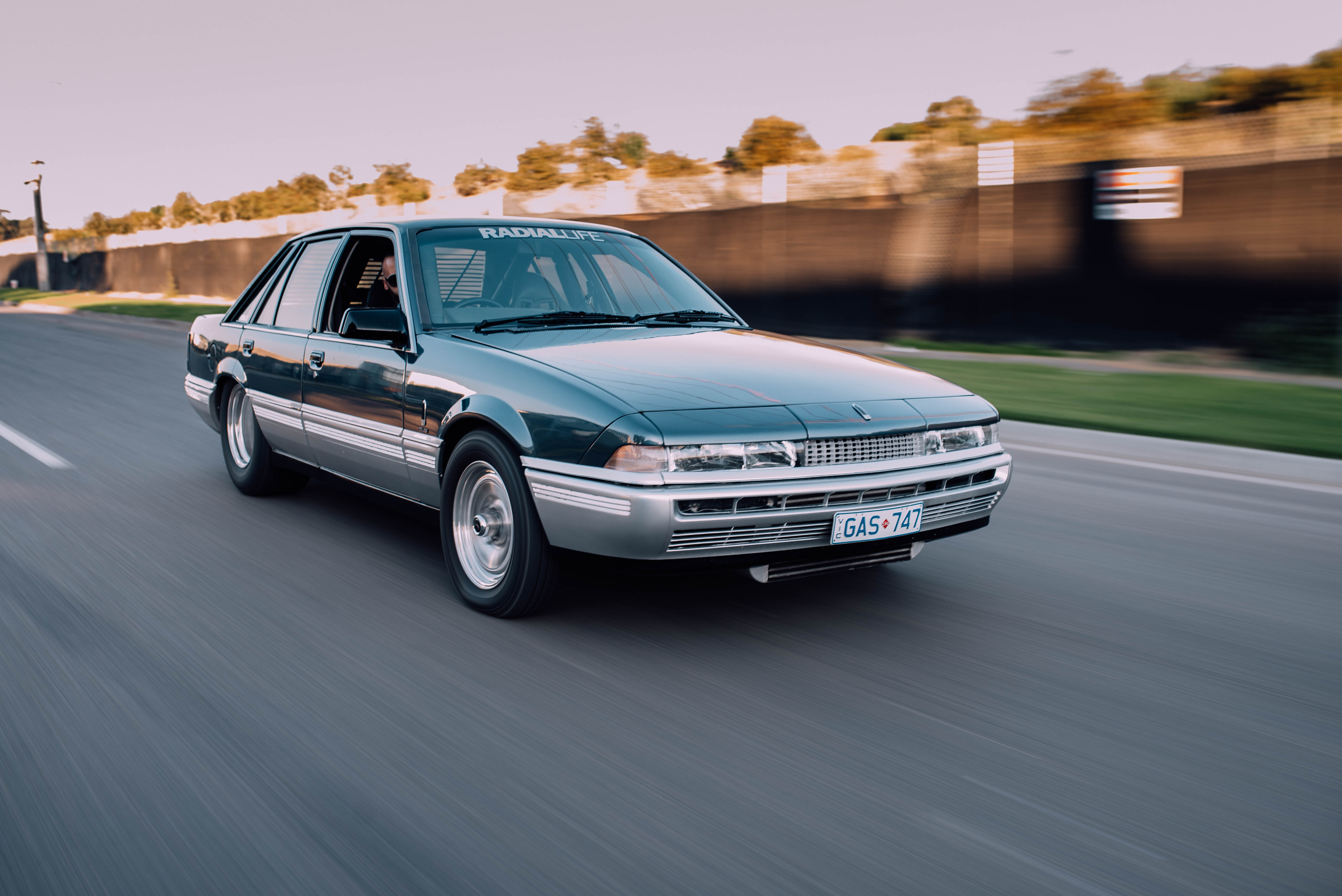
Holden VL Calais Turbo

Six months into its release, a 150 kW (201 hp) turbocharged RB30ET version of the Nissan engine was added. The Garrett turbo unit was fitted inside a water-cooled housing to ensure longevity. The engine received new pistons which lowered the compression ratio, while an updated camshaft was used to reduce overlap. The allure of the Commodore was quickly established particularly when the top speed was 200 km/h (124 mph) and then extended to 220 km/h (137 mph) with the addition of the Garrett turbocharger. The turbo models had larger brakes and Girlock finned alloy front calipers. The Australian Police commissioned the turbocharged models as their "interceptor" Highway Pursuit cars of choice. These interceptors were denoted by "BT1" in the model code on the Body & Option plate attached to the firewall.

GM also sourced a Jatco electronic four-speed automatic. Those that opted for a manual received 5-speed Nissan gearboxes. The turbo and non-turbo variants were designated MX7 and MF5 respectively.

Power was sent to the rear wheels through a Borg-Warner 28-spline (turbocharged variants) or 25-spline open center (naturally aspirated variant) with a 3.45 or 3.23 final drive ratio with a limited-slip version available as an option. This was taller than the ratio offered in the Nissan Skyline (3.70 Manual, 3.889 Auto), which utilised the same power plant.

The New Zealand assembled six-cylinder VLs had the 2.0-litre Nissan RB20 engine six-cylinder available as an option in addition to the 3.0-litre models. The engine was mated with the Japanese Jatco four-speed automatic; the 5.0-litre (4,987 cc) V8 remained available in carbureted form with the old three-speed automatic. 2-litre models, including those for New Zealand were not saddled with emission controls. Maximum power and torque figures are 95 kW (129 hp) at 5,600 rpm and 180 N⋅m (133 lb⋅ft) at 4,000 rpm. The 2.0 litre engine was also used in exports to other South East Asian countries such as Singapore and Thailand. This model was also the last Holden to be assembled and sold in Indonesia, initially as the "Holden Calais 2000" and also as the Holden Calais Enterprise. The car was first shown in Indonesia on 19 February 1987, at a ceremony attended by the Australian ambassador to Indonesia, Bill Morrison.

=== V8 engine ===
Previously, Holden had considered discontinuing their V8 engine rather than adapting it to unleaded petrol. This was partly in response to Ford Australia's 1983 decision to drop the V8 from its competing Falcon model. However, public outcry spearheaded by a media-driven "V8s 'til 98" campaign persuaded Holden to continue production. Eventually with continual developments, the Holden V8 lasted until 1999, before being replaced by the imported GM LS1 V8 engine.

The 5.0-litre V8 was released in October 1986, it still featured the familiar Rochester four-barrel carburettor, not electronic fuel injection (EFI). Now adapted to unleaded fuel, this V8 5.0-litre was boasting both more power and torque than its predecessor, now at 122 kW (164 hp) with 323 N⋅m (238 ft⋅lbf). GM had fitted the V8 with larger valves carried over from the previous Group A engine.

EFI did however, make its V8 debut in the VL Commodore in the evolution version of the Group A touring car homologation special, the SS Group A SV. Commonly known as "The Walkinshaw", the SS Group A SV also marked Holden Special Vehicles (HSV) taking over as Holden's official performance car partner. With the 150 kilowatts (200 hp) 3.0-litre turbocharged engine being the performance flagship, Holden marketed the V8 as ideal for towing due to its low-down torque characteristics. The V8 engine was mated with either the existing three-speed TriMatic automatic, or the five-speed Borg-Warner T-5 manual.

== Models ==
Introduced in Commodore SL, Executive and Berlina variants, the VL series also included a luxury Calais model. However, this was known as the "Holden Calais" as opposed to the "Holden Commodore Calais". A limited number of Calais station wagons (198 ever produced) were offered from March 1988 through to production end in August of the same year to reduce the stockpile of wagon bodies.

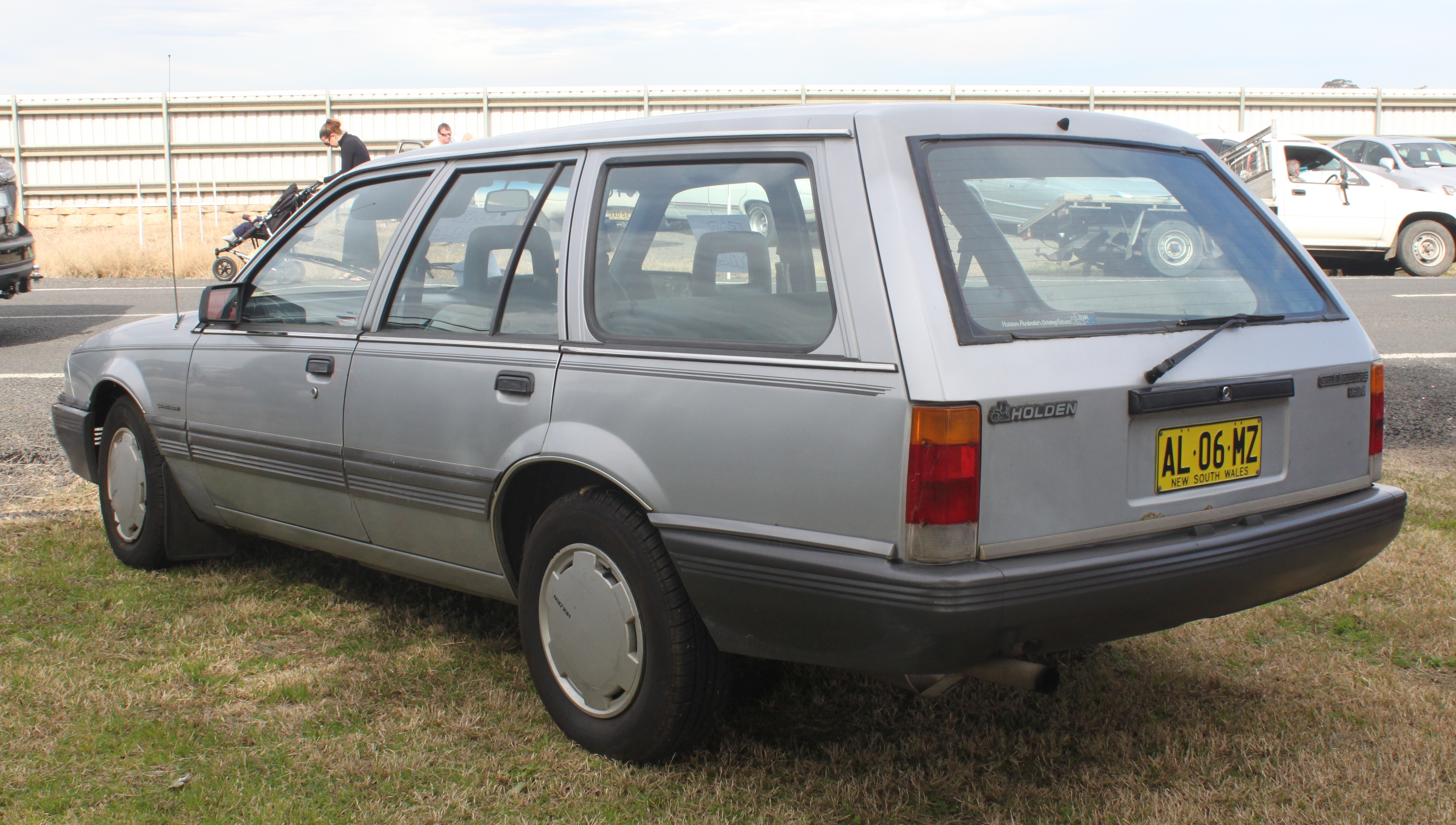
Commodore Executive wagon

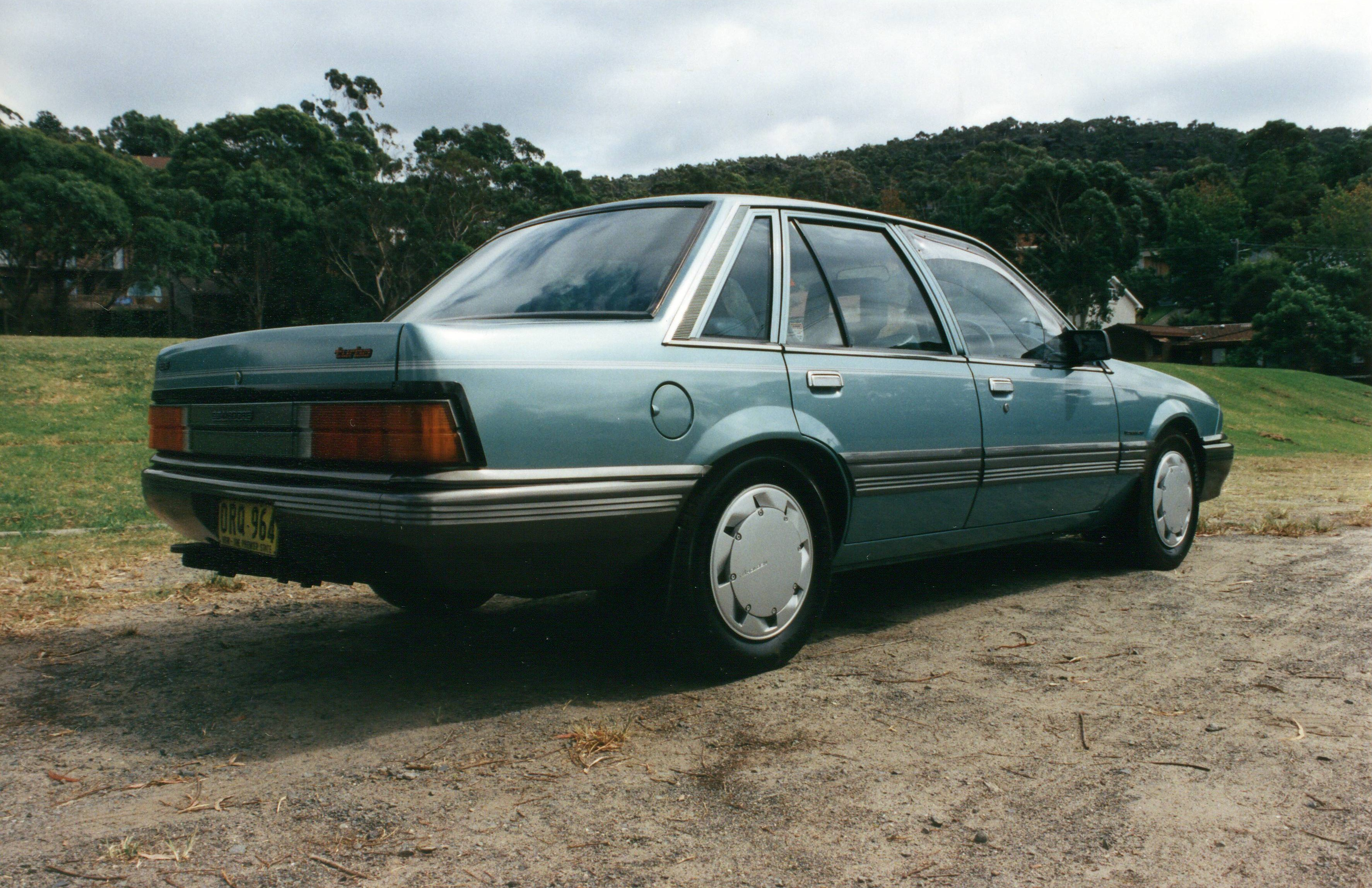
Commodore Executive Turbo sedan

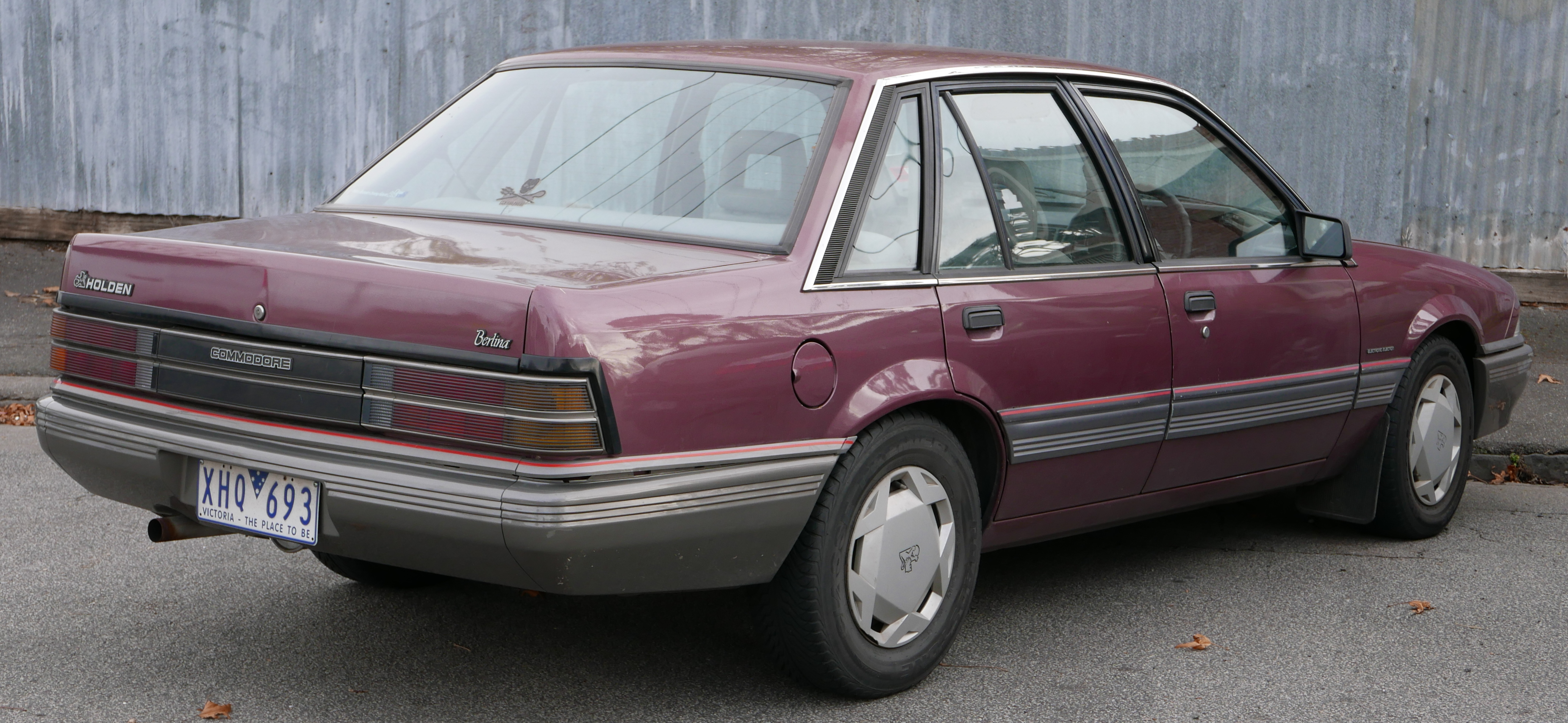
Commodore Berlina sedan

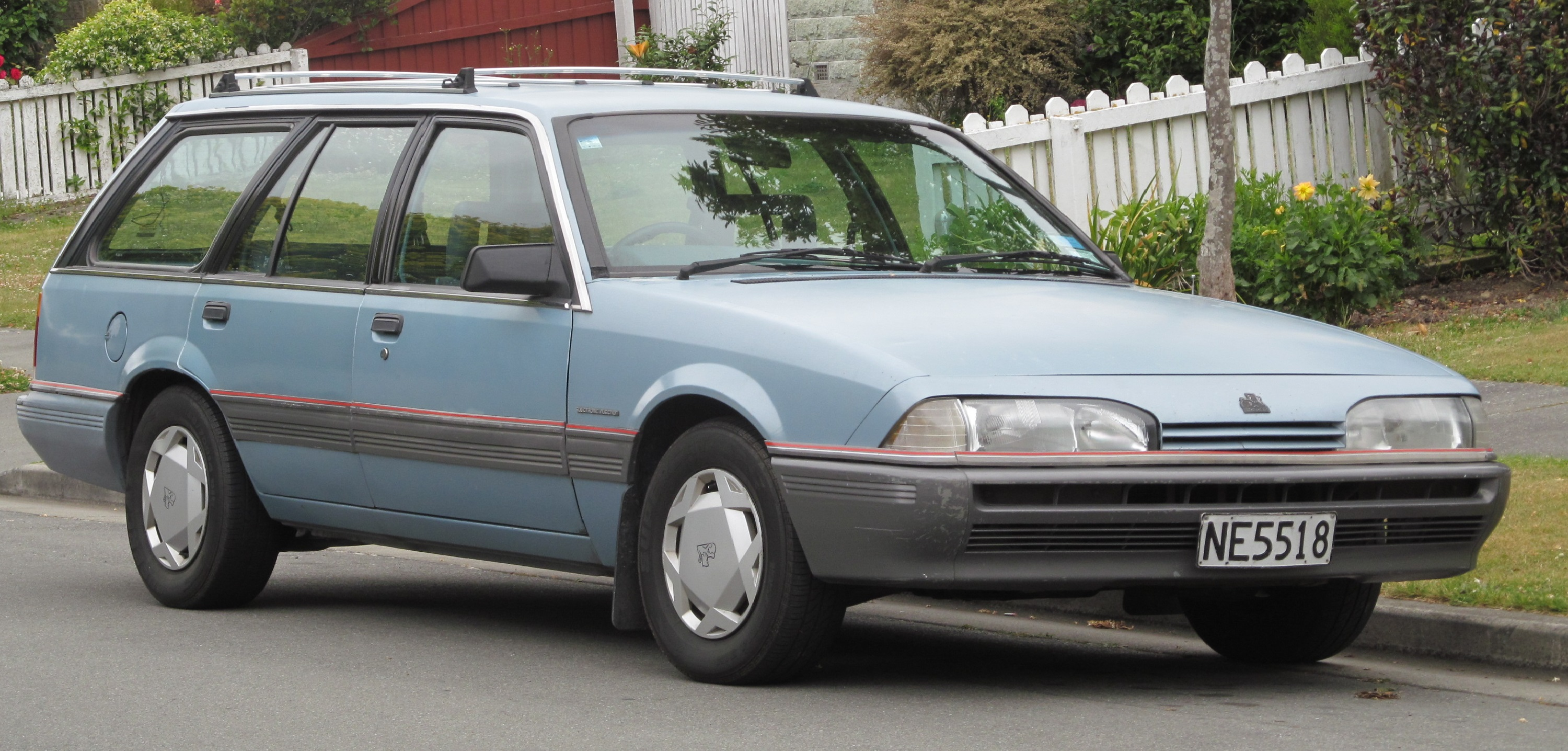
Commodore Berlina wagon (New Zealand)

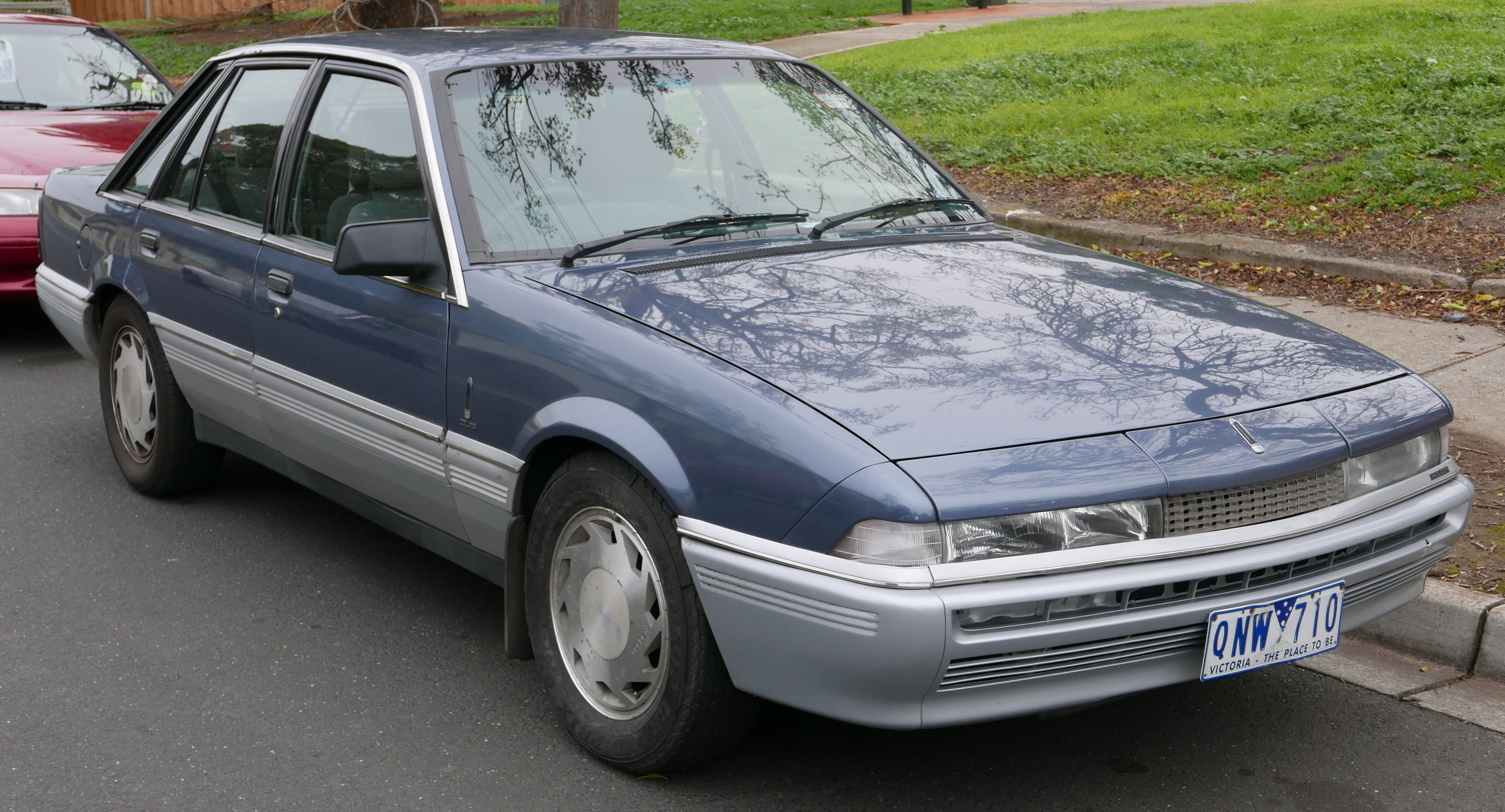
Calais sedan

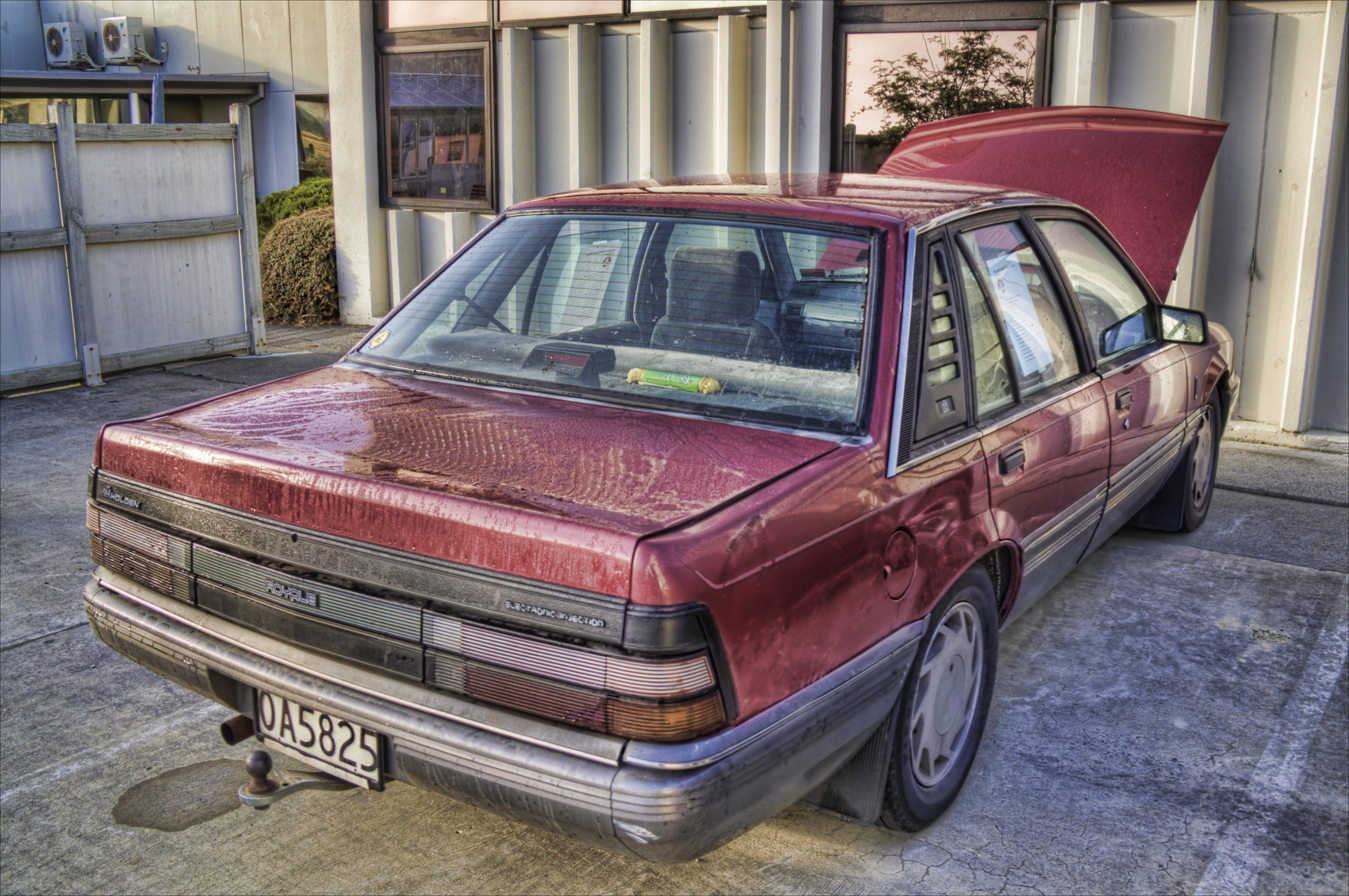
Commodore Royale sedan (New Zealand)

The V8-powered models were introduced in October 1986. The following year, a special edition Commodore Vacationer was offered. To commemorate the 1988 Australian Bicentenary, an aptly named "Series 200" sedan was briefly offered from March 1988. The Series 200 was issued with two-tone champagne paintwork, and featured air conditioning, power steering, electric windows, central locking among other features over the base-line Commodore SL. Only the naturally aspirated six-cylinder engine was fitted to this model.

=== New Zealand ===
New Zealand deliveries of the VL Commodores began in January 1987, with 3,500 Berlina sedans and wagons imported from Australia. These were fitted with either the three- or two-litre variant of the Nissan straight-six engine. The RB30E or RB20E. Local assembly began in March, initially only of the 2-litre, six-cylinder model. During the first year, the Calais was imported fully built-up with either the RB30E or the five-litre V8, but later in 1987 this was replaced by the locally assembled Commodore Royale, which looked the same as the Calais except for using the standard headlights and drum brakes at the rear. The VL was very successful in the New Zealand market, responsible for a 64 percent increase in Holden sales in the first half of 1987.

The sportier Commodore GTS was also a New Zealand-only model, introduced as a limited edition (300 examples) during 1987, all with the larger 3-litre engine. The GTS featured 15-inch alloy wheels, the Group A grille, a full aero kit, a reflective tail panel (Heckblende), and a sporty Grey velour interior with a black, leather Momo steering wheel. Half the cars built were painted Classic Red, the other half Alabaster White. In 1988 the Vacationer model was added (with either Nissan engine). In total, 16,050 Commodore VLs were sold in New Zealand; 6,550 of the smaller engine and 9,500 of the larger model. Some V8-engined Berlina Wagons were also assembled locally.

== SS Group A ==
The Commodore SS Group A was heavily modified by Holden's official performance tuner, originally the Holden Dealer Team. The SS Group A existed primarily as a homologation special, created specifically so a racing optimised version of the Commodore could be utilised for Group A touring car racing. The regulations set down by the international governing body FISA for Group A motor racing specified that a minimum of 5,000 base model cars were to be built, with a further 500 "Evolution" specials built to a certain specification prior to said vehicle being allowed to compete. Group A regulations governed many touring car series at the 1980s and 1990s including series in Australia, New Zealand, Great Britain, Japan, Italy, Germany and the European Touring Car Championship as well as the one-off 1987 World Touring Car Championship, as well as significant races like the Bathurst 1000, Spa 24 Hours and the RAC Tourist Trophy. The SS Group A model run ran from 1985 until 1992. The four models have since become highly collectible amongst Holden and performance enthusiasts.

Unique amongst all products produced by both the Holden Dealer Team and Holden Special Vehicles, these cars were referred to as Holdens, rather than as HDTs or HSVs.

November 1986 (produced until 1987) saw the introduction of the Commodore SS Group A which was developed from the Commodore SL by Peter Brock's HDT Special Vehicles organisation. 500 examples were built, all of them in "Permanent Red", by Holden to allow the model to be homologated for Group A racing. Along with better aerodynamics of the VL Commodore over the VK model, the VL SS Group A featured larger and more aggressive front and rear spoilers, as well as a small, open bonnet scoop to help feed the carburetted V8 engine the colder air from the base of the windscreen. The VL Commodore was the last V8 powered Holden to feature a carburetor. From the Holden VN Commodore (and the VL SS Group A's successor the VL SS Group A SV), all Holden V8 powered cars would use Fuel injection.

The cars were assembled at Holden's Dandenong plant and modified at the HDT Special Vehicles located in Port Melbourne.

This was the last Group A Commodore produced by the HDT after Holden sensationally ended its relationship with Brock and the team in February 1987, after Brock had begun fitting a device known as the "Energy Polarizer" to HDT vehicles, including the VL SS Group A. Brock claimed that the Polarizer, a small box with crystals and magnets encased in an epoxy resin, aligned the molecules around the car and "made a shithouse car good". Regarded as pseudoscience by Holden and the vast majority of the Australian motoring community, a new VL series "Director" model was released by Brock in February 1987 which incorporated not only the Polarizer but also a new independent rear suspension system developed by HDT without Holden's approval. Holden ended its association with Brock as he had refused to supply a Director for test purposes and Holden was therefore unwilling to honour warranties on any cars thereafter modified by Brock's HDT operation. Holden's decision to end its relationship with Brock ended the HDT being their 'factory' team, an association which had started in 1969.

After dumping the HDT, Holden formed the Holden Motor Sports Group in late February 1987 and signed Roadways Racing (Allan Grice) and Perkins Engineering (Larry Perkins) as their factory backed teams for the year, with both Grice and Perkins Commodore's wearing Holden Motorsport logo's, though both Perkins and Grice claim that the support was almost in name only and they received no financial assistance from Holden. Ironically, in late 1986 before the Holden-HDT split but with the relationship already fraying due to Brock's fitting of the "Energy Polarizer" to HDT modified cars, Brock had predicted that Holden had become weary of the HDT's growing independence and wanted to start its own specialised vehicle operation (ultimately Holden Special Vehicles) and the Holden Motor Sports Group. Up until the split with Brock and the HDT, this was denied by Holden who claimed they were happy to continue their on-going relationship.

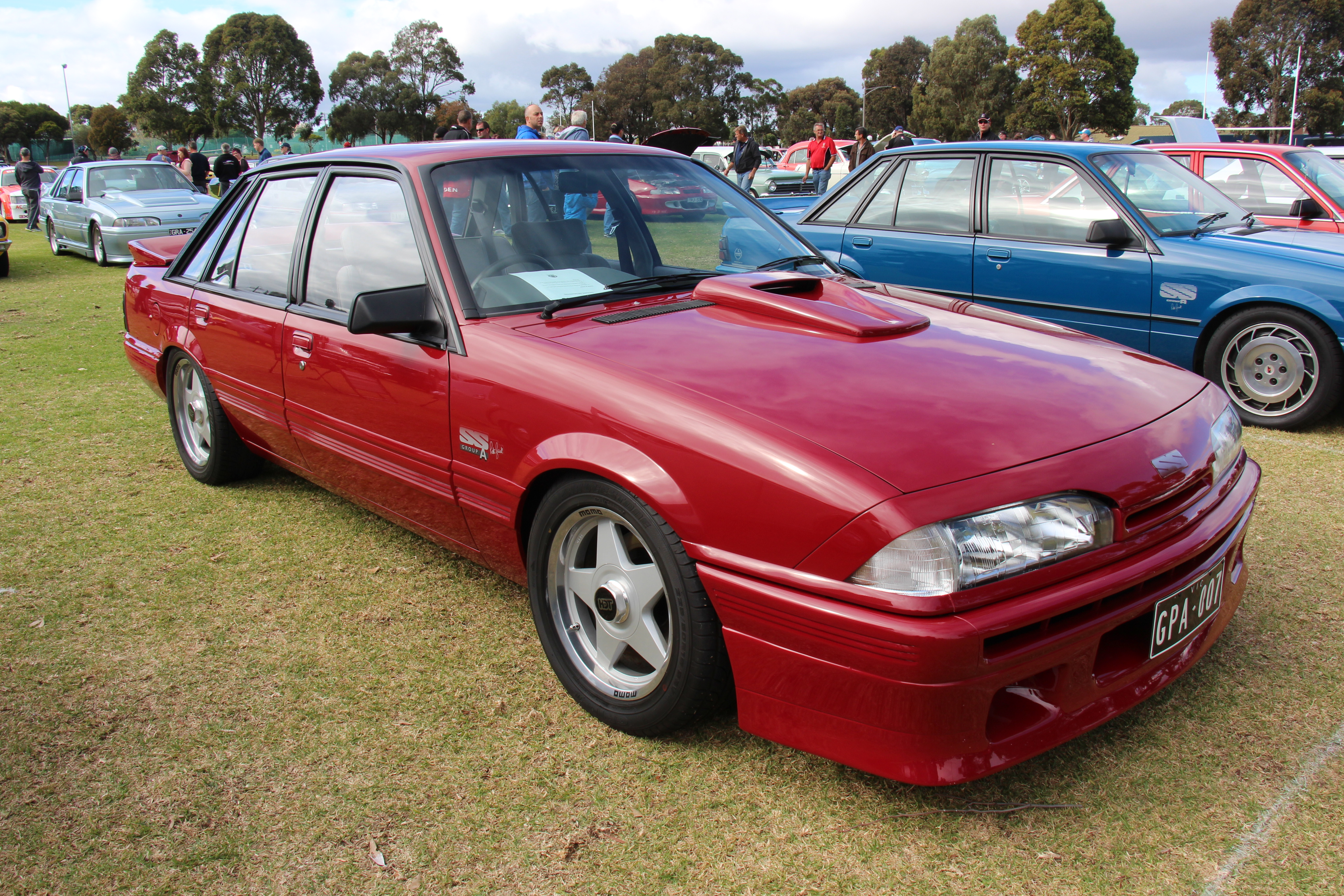
Commodore SS Group A

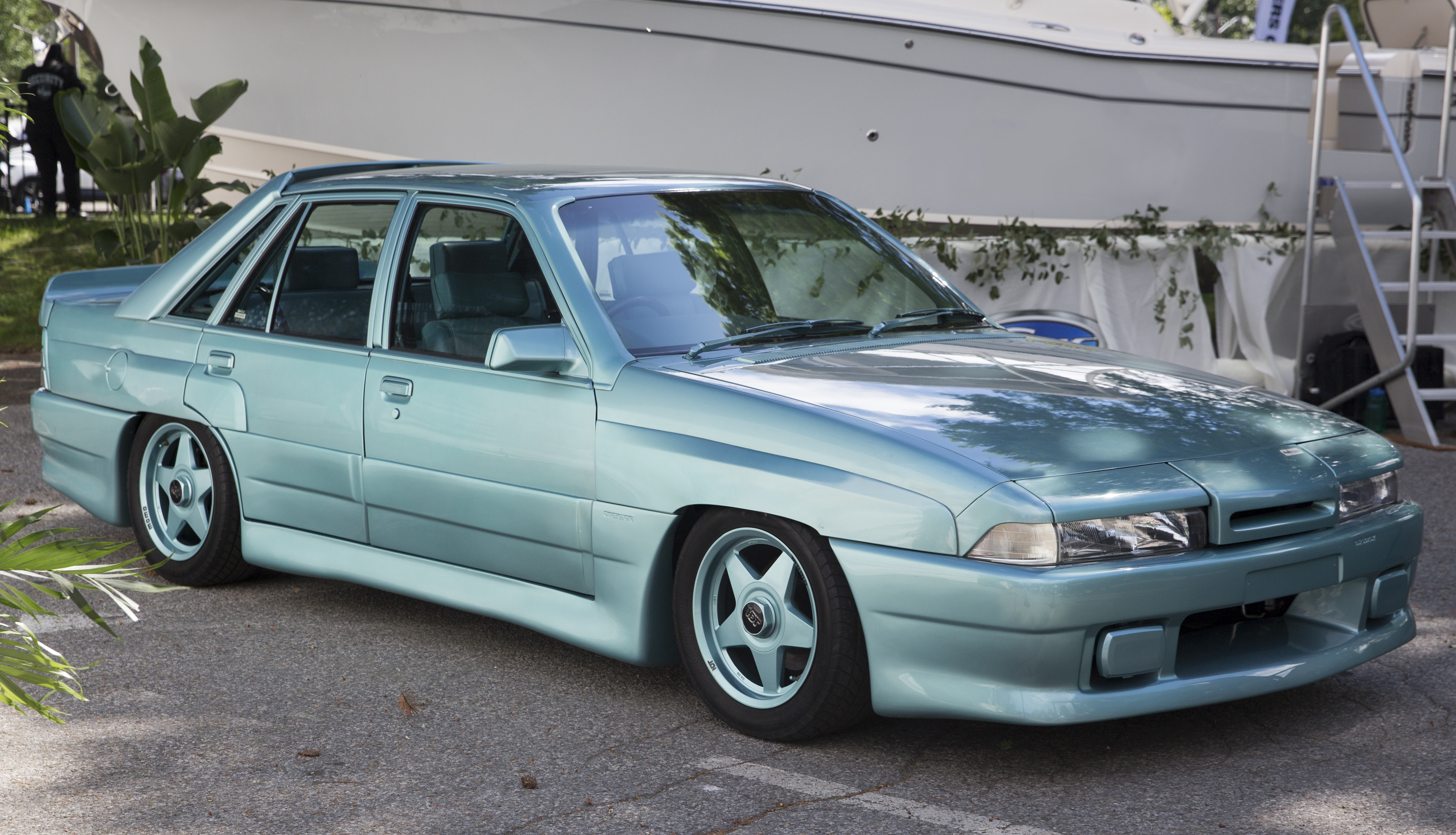
HDT Director (Peter Brock's own, showcase example)

=== Motor racing ===
Touring Cars

The SS Group A was twice a winner during the inaugural World Touring Car Championship in 1987. Allan Moffat and John Harvey drove their Rothmans sponsored VL Commodore to victory in the very first race of the championship at Monza in Italy. Initially finishing 7th on the road, the pair were declared winners after the entire BMW Motorsport crew running the new BMW M3's that finished the race 1–6 were disqualified for running 80 kg underweight thanks to the use of non-homologated kevlar and carbon fibre body panels. Moffat and Harvey would later go on to finish a brilliant 4th at the Spa 24 Hours on the famous Spa-Francorchamps circuit in Belgium, before Moffat abandoned the Commodore and returned to rivals Ford (for the first time since 1980) and their highly touted new challenger, the turbocharged Ford Sierra RS500.

The HDT spec Commodore's second win in the 1987 WTCC was at the 1987 James Hardie 1000 at Bathurst. Peter Brock and his HDT had a well publicised split with Holden in early 1987 which saw the factory stop all support for the race team. Running as a privateer at Bathurst for the first time since 1977, Brock finished 3rd on the road driving with Peter McLeod and regular HDT co-driver David Parsons in the team's second car (#10) after his own car blew its engine on lap 34 with Parsons at the wheel. The two Eggenberger Motorsport Ford Sierra RS500's that finished 1st and 2nd were eventually disqualified in February 1988 for illegal bodywork (wheel arches that were 1 size too big) and Brock's HDT were declared winners giving the HDT spec VL Group A SS Commodore two wins from the 11 race WTCC. Allan Moffat's big money gamble to run a Sierra backfired as the car he leased from British driver/engineer Andy Rouse proved to be woefully unreliable. Moffat later claimed that he should have stuck with his original entry for Bathurst, his VL Commodore, stating that his Commodore (which at the time was in storage in Europe) was in much better shape than Brock's #10 which, by the HDT's own admission was cobbled together from whatever spare parts they had and was only run due to the teams contract with primary sponsor Mobil which called for two race cars. The HDT openly admitted surprise to the car finishing the race believing before the start that it would have been lucky to last 30 of the race's 161 laps.

Until 2014, The Brock / McLeod / Parsons VL Commodore Group A SS held the record at Bathurst for winning the race from the lowest grid position, with Brock having qualified the car in 20th place. Ironically this was actually against the rules as he had already qualified his own #05 car in 11th spot and no driver can qualify two separate cars for grid position the race. Had the error been corrected, the #10 car would have started the race from 27th with Brock's time serving only to qualify him in the car.

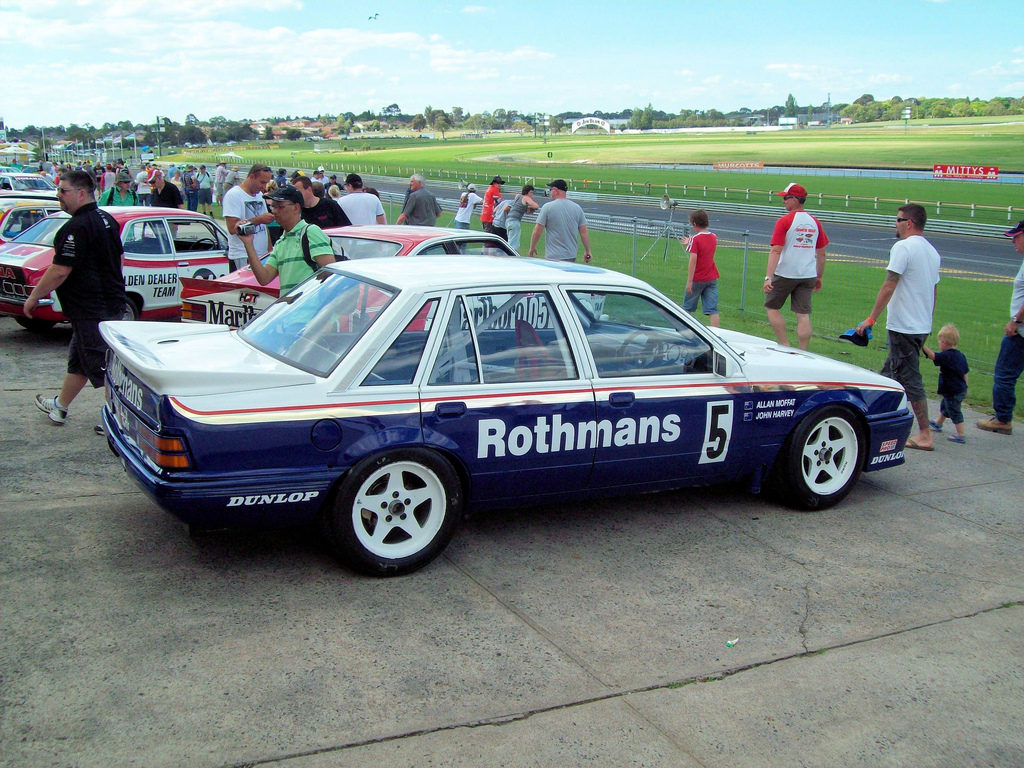
Holden VL Commodore SS Group A of Allan Moffat and John Harvey, winner of the 1987 Monza 500, on display at the Historic Sandown 2009

Larry Perkins, who had continued to race the well developed VK rather than upgrade to the VL (which both Brock and Allan Grice reported small teething problems throughout the 1987 Australian Touring Car Championship), was forced to replace his VK when it was badly damaged on just the second lap at Bathurst with a HDT VL, debuting VL in the Bob Jane T-Marts 500 WTCC round at Calder Park Raceway a week after Bathurst. He later qualified his new car on pole and led the early laps of the Group A support race for the 1987 Australian Grand Prix in Adelaide before tyre wear and failing brakes on the demanding Adelaide Street Circuit forced him to drop back to 3rd at the finish. In the 1988 Australian Touring Car Championship Perkins ran the VL as the official factory team backed by the then new Holden Special Vehicles (later to be replaced by the Holden Racing Team). Against the lighter (by approximately 225 kg (496 lb)) and more powerful (by up to 130 bhp (97 kW; 132 PS)) Ford Sierras, as well of the introduction of the new Nissan Skyline GTS-R turbo, Perkins and the VL simply didn't have the speed to successfully compete for wins in the ATCC's shorter sprint races, while the weight of the car (1,325 kg (2,921 lb)) usually saw heavy tyre wear. His best result being 3rd in Round 7 at Sandown after some of the faster Sierras had struck mechanical trouble. Perkins would go on to finish 7th overall in the championship.

AUSCAR

The VL model was also successful in AUSCAR racing. Races were primarily held at the Calder Park Thunderdome in Melbourne, a 1.801 km (1.119 mi) quad-oval speedway with 24-degree banking in the turns for high speed built by millionaire tyre retailer Bob Jane. The Thunderdome was noted as the first NASCAR style high-banked oval built outside of North America. Sydney based racer Tony Kavich won the 1988/89 Australian AUSCAR series using a VL Commodore, while Albury based Brad Jones won the first of what would be five straight AUSCAR titles in 1989/90 also driving a VL.

VL model AUSCAR's used a variation of the HDT's SS Group A body kit, with the only difference being that the cars had a regular VL bonnet without the air scoop of the Group A version. In AUSCAR racing, all Holden Commodores including the VL used the 5.0 L Holden V8 engine – though Commodore runners had the option of using the Group A specified 4.9-litre V8. However, unlike in Group A racing, the weight of the AUSCAR remained the same whichever size engine was used.

== SS Group A SV ==
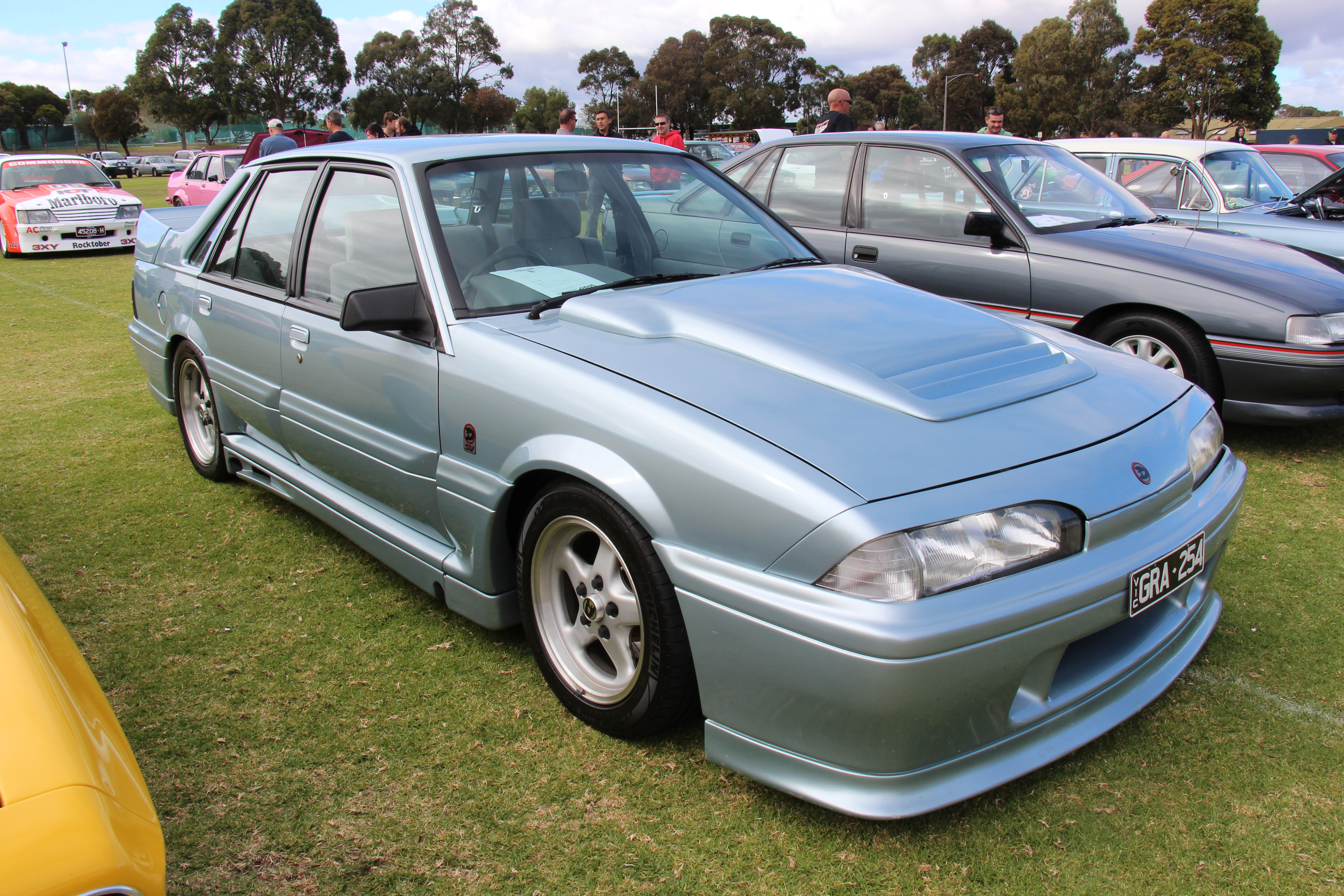
Commodore SS Group A SV

The SS Group A SV was produced in 1988 and was only available in one colour, Panorama Silver (named after the Mount Panorama Circuit). It was assembled at Dandenong, Victoria by Holden and modified at Clayton, Victoria by HSV.

The car carried Holden badges because of Group A racing homologation regulations, which necessitated at least 500 road-going versions to be sold to the public. A series of 500 vehicles was commissioned by Holden, which rose to 750 to satisfy demand. All were finished in Panorama Silver paint.

TWR developed the Walkinshaw bodykit that was stated to reduce drag by more than 25% over the previous Holden Dealer Team SS Group A. Due to its high use of plastic in the bodykit, it was nicknamed the "Plastic Pig" and "Batmobile". Other nicknames included the "Walkinshaw" and "Walky" (after TWR's chief Tom Walkinshaw).

The engine, although rated at five litres and 180 kW (241 hp), was specially made to withstand racing conditions. The block was specially cast and crankcase was fitted with four bolt main bearing caps. The heads were revised with high-flow intake ports and roller rockers. Special connecting rods, crankshafts, and pistons were fitted as well as a custom exhaust. The key feature though was the fabled Walkinshaw twin throttle body inlet manifold, which had been specially developed for the Group A and featured sequential setup with a smaller and larger throttle body. This was fitted with a restrictor plate on the larger, secondary throttle body, which actually let less air through than the smaller throttle body. Some reports have indicated that as much as 50–60 horsepower can be gained from the removal of the restrictor plates.

The Group A SV was made as a limited run of 500 from March to November 1988, but HSV subsequently decided to make 250 more units to meet demand. However, these were slow to sell with some examples having their appearance modified by dealers in an effort to get them out of the showrooms and others sold years after their launch. Slow sales were also impacted by Holden releasing the new generation VN-series Commodore in August 1988, though a new Group A homologation special (the VN Commodore SS Group A) would follow only in 1990.

=== Motor racing ===
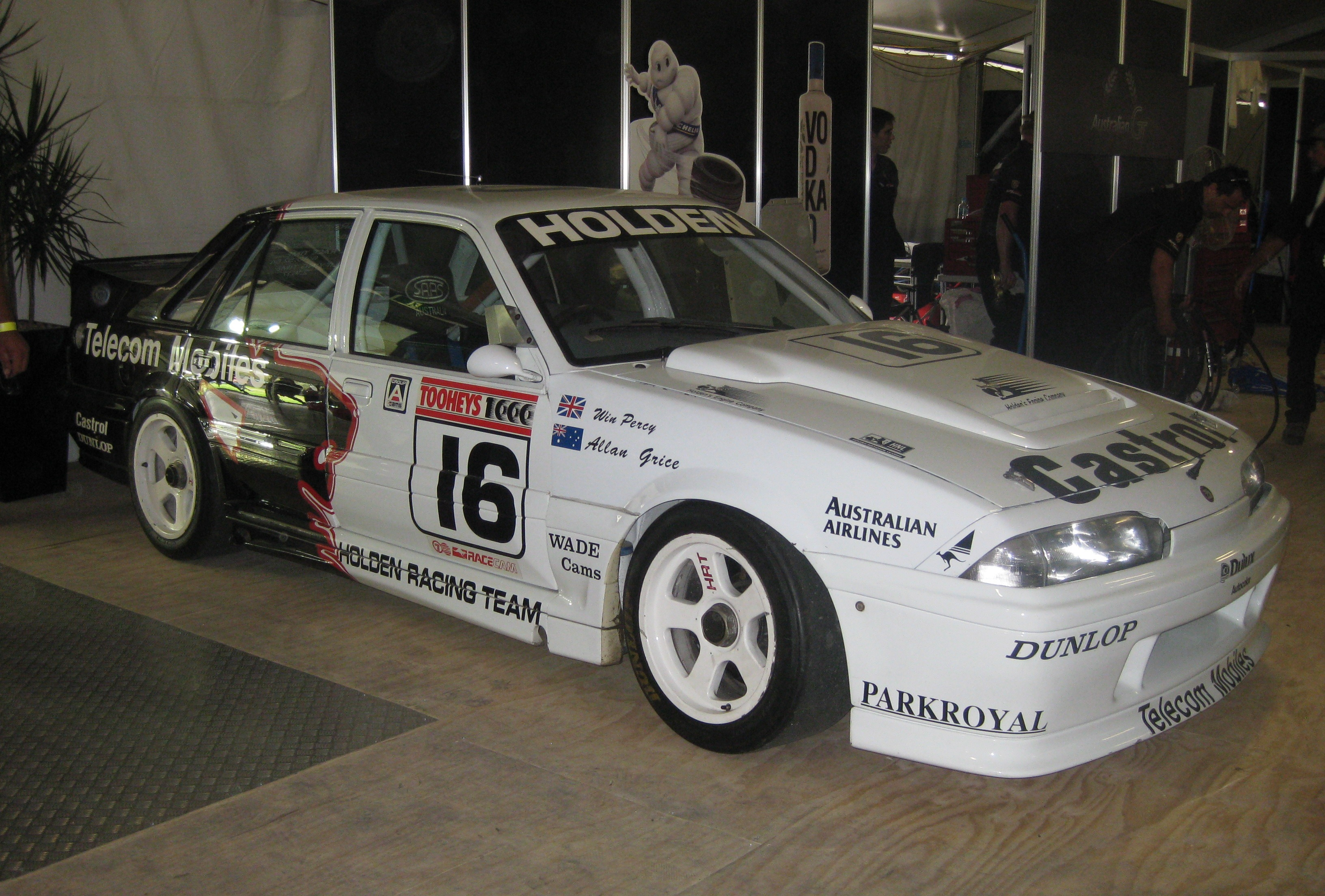
The Holden VL Commodore SS Group A SV driven to victory in the 1990 Tooheys 1000 by Win Percy and Allan Grice

The Group A SV, according to reports, should have made its track debut early in the 1988 ATCC. However, due to the split between Holden and Peter Brock in 1987, the car was severely delayed in the change from HDT to HSV. Instead the car made its world racing debut on 21 August at Brands Hatch in the hands of Mike O'Brien, scoring a 13th place in the 10th round of the 1988 British Touring Car Championship. Its Australian racing debut occurred on 28 August at Oran Park, driven by Garry Willmington in the 1988 Pepsi 250, with Willmington failing to finish.

HSV owner Tom Walkinshaw and his longtime TWR driver Jeff Allam drove a TWR entered SV in the 1988 RAC Tourist Trophy race at Silverstone on 4 September, finishing 15th. The car proved itself quick but not up to the speed of the Ford Sierra RS500's. Walkinshaw found the Commodore's performance level to be about the same as the factory Nissan Skyline GTS-R's. TWR also raced the SV at the 1988 Tooheys 1000 in a joint effort with the Perkins run (but TWR owned) HSV Team. The car was retired after just 5 laps with rear suspension failure. Walkinshaw himself was cross-entered in the Perkins/Denny Hulme car for the race. That car was retired from 2nd place after 137 laps with engine failure, a rare thing for a Perkins built engine. This was also the last time Tom Walkinshaw raced as the 1984 European Touring Car Champion retired from driving after the event. The best result for the new VL in its first year was when Perkins and Holden Special Vehicles teammate Denny Hulme scored a 1–2 result in the Group A support race at the 1988 Australian Grand Prix. The pair had earlier finished second at the 1988 Enzed 500 in the factory teams debut of the new car, while their teammates for the race (in Perkin's updated ATCC VL), Armin Hahne and Jeff Allam retired after 56 laps of the 129 lap race.

Wins and even placings were hard to come by for the cars in Australian Touring Car racing during 1989 and 1990 as they were up against the lighter and more powerful turbocharged Ford Sierra RS500's and Nissan Skyline GTS-R's. The factory backed Holden Racing Team was hardly seen other than at the major endurance races at Sandown and Bathurst and it was left to the privateers to fly the flag for Holden. At the Sandown 500, Perkins teamed with Win Percy to finish 2nd behind the Skyline of Jim Richards and Mark Skaife. At the 1989 Tooheys 1000, the fastest Holden was the Holden Racing Team VL of Perkins and defending race winner Tomas Mezera who qualified 11th, some 3 seconds off the pace. This meant that for the first time since it was introduced in 1978 no Holden qualified for the pole shootout. In the race the two HRT cars of Perkins/Mezera and Percy/Neil Crompton finished 6th and 7th respectively and were the first Commodore's to finish, 3 laps down on the winning Dick Johnson/John Bowe Sierra.

Fortunes for the car turned around with a surprise win in the 1990 Tooheys 1000 by Win Percy and local hero Allan Grice driving for the Holden Racing Team (the winning car was in fact the same car that failed under team owner Walkinshaw during the 1988 race). This was followed by a win in the 1990 Nissan Sydney 500 at Eastern Creek Raceway by Perkins and Tomas Mezera in Perkins privately entered car.

The car was replaced for 1991 by the Holden VN Commodore SS Group A but made a comeback of sorts in 1992 again campaigned by Perkins who reverted to the VL model once more, winning the 1992 Sandown 500 before going on to start on the front row at Bathurst. The Sandown event was the last major win for the VL SS Group A SV.

For 1993 the VL was abandoned by the major teams in Australia as that year saw the start of what is today's V8 Supercars. The car was still used by the majority of the privateer teams up until the end of the 1995 Australian Touring Car season.

== HSV SV88 ==
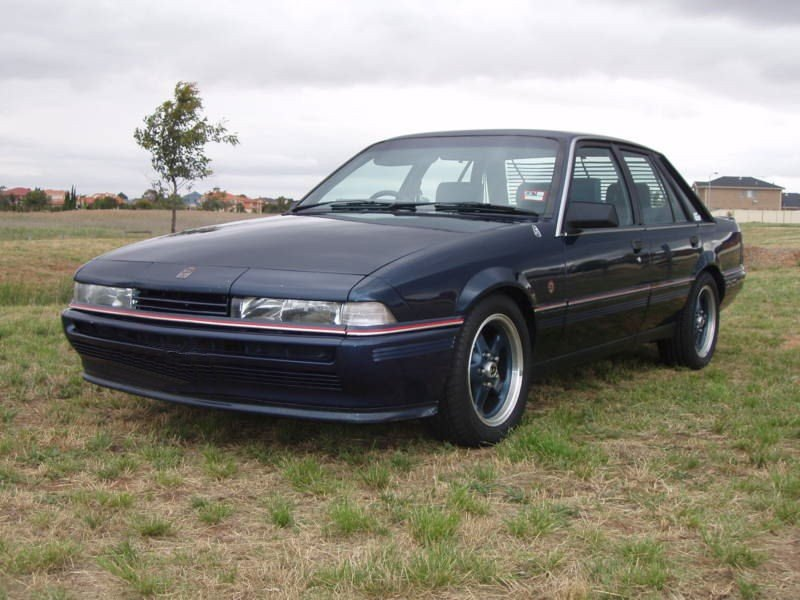
HSV SV88

The HSV SV88 was Holden Special Vehicles's (HSV) first production car and attempt at a luxury performance car (in similar vein to the HDT Director). It was based on the 5.0-litre VL Calais with upgraded power level (up 10 kilowatts (13 hp) to 136 kilowatts (182 hp) and 355 newton-metres (262 lb⋅ft) of torque). The SV88 also featured a minor bodykit and VL Group A 16×7 wheels painted in the bodycolour (which was "Dorward Blue"). On top of Holden's list of options, buyers could also have an in-car phone and a fax.

During 1986, Peter Brock's HDT Special Vehicles were instrumental in engineering the final fitment of the unleaded version of the carburetted V8 into the new updated Commodore, delivering 126 kilowatts (169 hp). This motor in standard Holden form was still down on power compared to the Japanese-sourced Nissan turbo six-cylinder.

Soon after the release of HSV's Walkinshaw, May 1988 saw the release of yet another SV derivative—the limited edition Calais based "SV88" which was a vehicle built for the luxury buyer. In a completely different arena to the "Walkinshaw" Group A homologation special, which was based on Holden's SS, the SV88 was based on the top-of-the-line Calais and thus came equipped from the factory with better sound deadening and did not require SV's refitment of the Calais standard options. The SV88 also did not utilize the Group A motor and instead came equipped with the familiar Rochester quadrajet powered 4.9-litre, which was up-specced using left over HDT internals to produce 136 kilowatts (182 hp) and 355 newton-metres (262 lb⋅ft).

Interior in the SV88 was HSV sports leather and velour in light blue, with optional car phone and or mobile fax available for order. The body kit on the SV88 consisted of slat type grille and a rear deck spoiler combination. Like the Holden Calais, the SV88 Calais was actually painted in two tone "Dorward Blue" over "Jewel Midnight" and separated with a unique red pin stripe.
