= Toyota Corona =

Series of automobiles manufactured by Toyota (1957–2001)

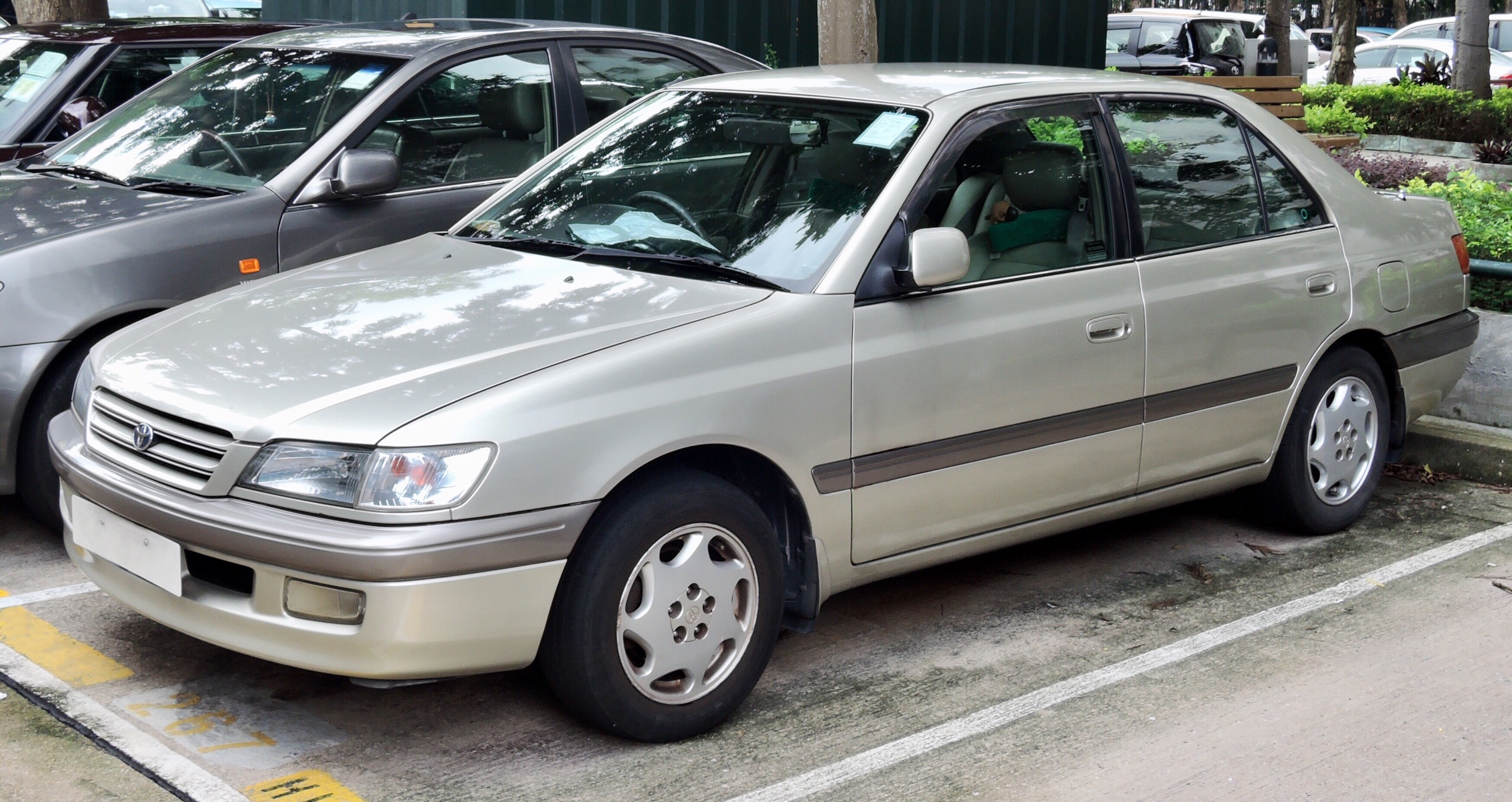
- Tenth generation Toyota Corona (T210, Hong Kong)

Overview
- Manufacturer: Toyota
- Production: July 1957 – December 2001

Body and chassis
- Class: Compact car (RWD model); Mid-size car (FWD model)
- Layout: Front-engine, rear-wheel-drive (1957–1987); Front-engine, front-wheel-drive (1983–2001)
- Related: Toyota Mark II (1968–1972); Toyota Carina (1984–2001)

Chronology
- Predecessor: Toyopet Master
- Successor: Toyota Premio (Japan); Toyota Avensis (Europe); Toyota Camry (Asia-Pacific/Americas)

The Toyota Corona (Japanese: トヨタ・コロナ, Toyota Korona) is an automobile manufactured by the Japanese automaker Toyota across eleven generations between 1957 and 2001. On launch, the Corona was Toyota's second-highest product in their range, just below the Crown. The Corona was marketed in the JDM at Toyota's Toyopet Store dealership channels, and the Corona was one of Toyota's first models exported to other global markets, followed by the smaller Toyota Corolla.

The Corona played a key role in Toyota's North American success. Having previously entered the North American passenger car market in 1957 as Toyopet, the company met little success, withdrawing in 1961. The company re-entered the North American market in June 1964, rebranded as Toyota, introducing its third-generation Corona with more modern technology and numerous standard features. Toyota advertised the car prominently, with the company's first television commercial featuring the Corona. The car was well received, winning the 1969 Road Test Import Car of the Year. The Corona helped boost U.S. sales of Toyota vehicles to more than 20,000 units in 1966 (a threefold increase), making the company the third-best-selling import brand in the United States by 1967. In 2014, editors at Car and Driver called the Corona one of the best Toyotas ever made, arguing that Toyota survived long enough to thrive in America because of the Corona.

By 1968, the Corona name was used on a larger platform, marketed as the Corona Mark II. The Corona itself was marketed under numerous nameplates worldwide, including in European markets as Carinas, and a variant of the Corona was offered in various markets as the Carina. The Corona was ultimately replaced in Japan by the Toyota Premio; in Europe by the Toyota Avensis; and in Asia, Pacific markets, and the Americas by the Toyota Camry.

The nameplate corona derives from the Latin word for "crown", the sedan taking its place just below Toyota's similarly named flagship, the Toyota Crown.

== First generation (T10; 1957) ==
First generation
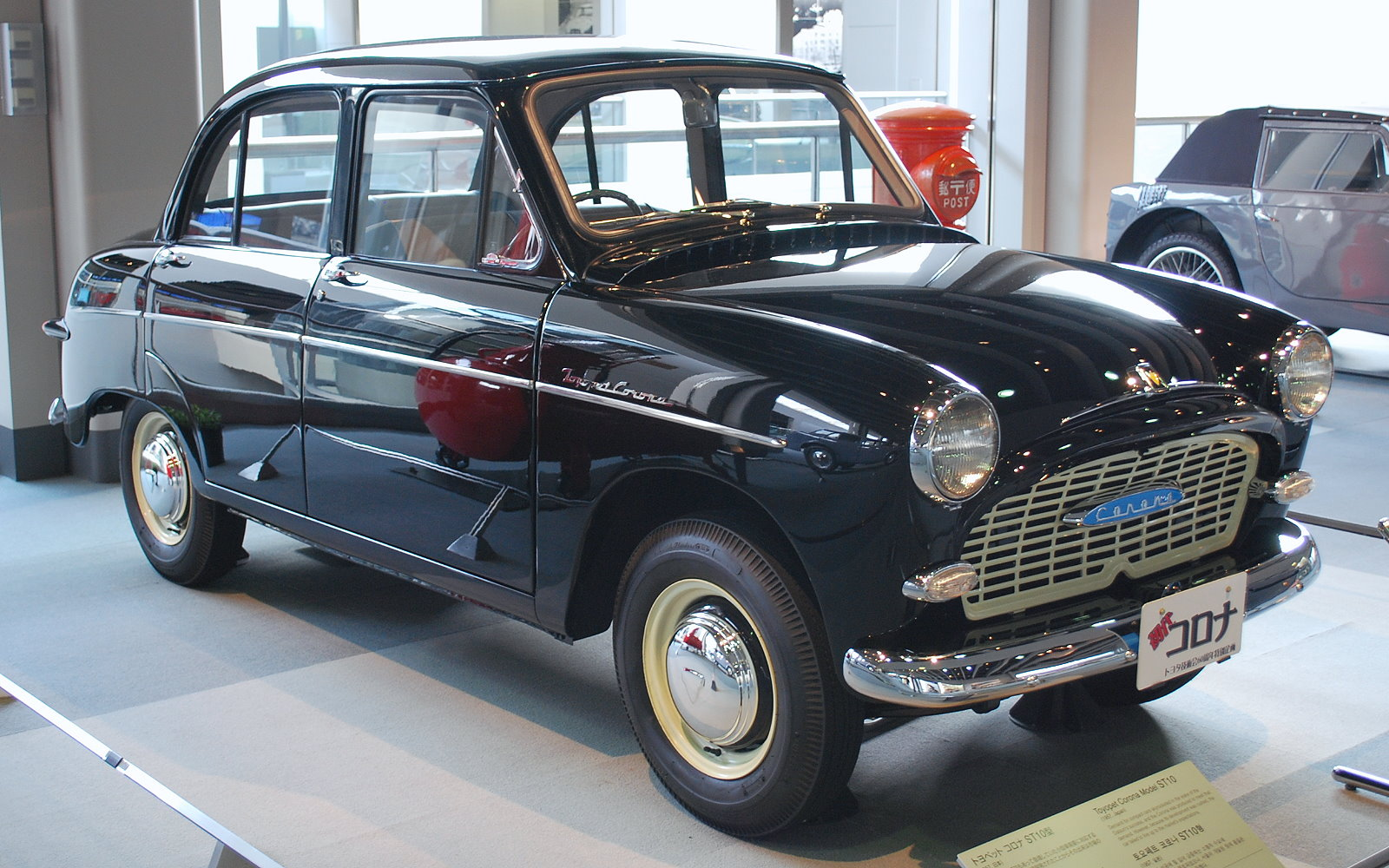
- 1957 Toyopet Corona sedan (ST10)

Overview
- Model code: T10
- Also called: Toyopet Corona (sedan); Toyopet Coronaline (van)
- Production: 1957–1960
- Assembly: Japan: Toyota, Aichi (Koromo plant)

Body and chassis
- Body style: 4-door sedan (T10); 3-door van (T16V)
- Layout: Front-engine, rear-wheel-drive
- Related: Toyota Crown; Toyopet Master

Powertrain
- Engine: 995 cc S I4 (ST10/16V); 997 cc P I4 (PT10/16V)
- Transmission: 3-speed manual

Dimensions
- Wheelbase: 2,400 mm (94.5 in)
- Length: 3,912 mm (154.0 in) (sedan); 3,970 mm (156.3 in) (van)
- Width: 1,470 mm (57.9 in) (sedan); 1,475 mm (58.1 in) (van)
- Height: 1,518 mm (59.8 in) (sedan); 1,755 mm (69.1 in) (van)
- Curb weight: 960 kg (2,116 lb) (sedan); 1,005 kg (2,216 lb) (van)

The first-generation Corona, introduced in May 1957 and became available on the market two months later, was designed with parts from the previous-generation Crown and Master following a major restyle and enlargement of the Crown. The design of many of the body panels were cut down from the Master which had ceased production. Aside from the 4-door T10 sedan, the T16V 3-door van version was introduced in October 1958 as Toyopet Coronaline. Originally, the T10/16 Corona was fitted with the old sidevalve "S" engine, with 33 PS (24 kW). In April 1958 the Corona underwent a light facelift, with a new bonnet ornament and door handles. The tail light design of this generation is reminiscent of the 1949 Ford sedan.

The 997 cc (60.8 cu in) OHV P series engine replaced the old S in October 1959, and offered substantially more power with 45 PS (33 kW) at 5,000 rpm. The P-engined Corona sedan was capable of traveling at 105 km/h (65 mph), 15 km/h (9 mph) higher than the old S-engined model. The car also underwent another facelift, including a mesh grille and a new rear seat which allowed seating for five rather than the previous four. As regulations regarding taxis at the time required engines no larger than 910 cc (56 cu in), dealers restricted the power for taxi vehicles. Due to the upgrade in dimensions of the Crown, Toyota needed to continue manufacturing a vehicle with similar size dimensions to the first Crown, primarily to be used for taxi usage. This vehicle was also the first Toyota's car with a monocoque chassis structure, and an independent front suspension using double wishbones. Due to the monocoque chassis, Toyota was able to produce a vehicle under 1,000 kg (2,200 lb).

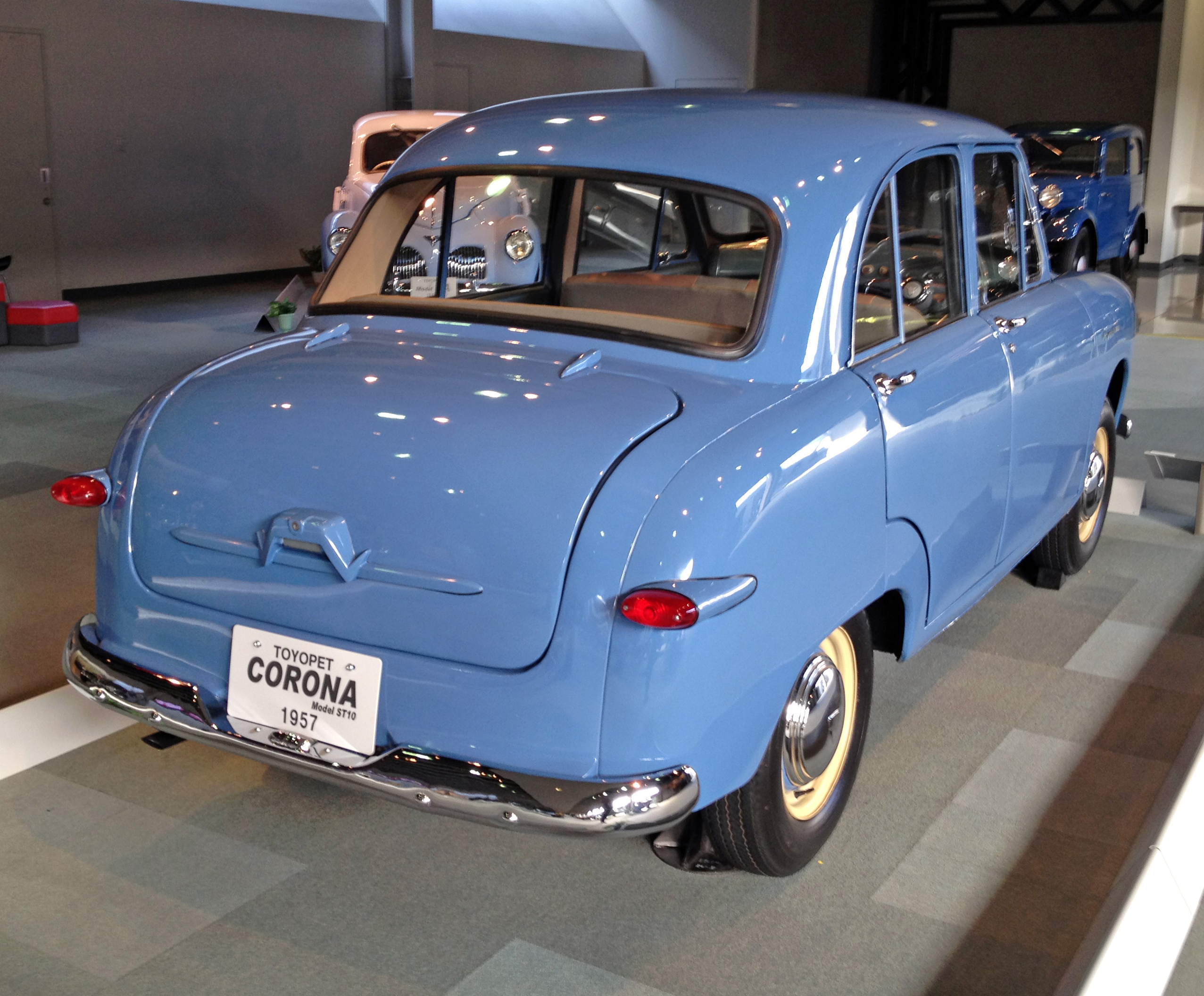
Rear view of 1957 Corona (ST10)

== Second generation (T20, T30; 1960) ==
Second generation
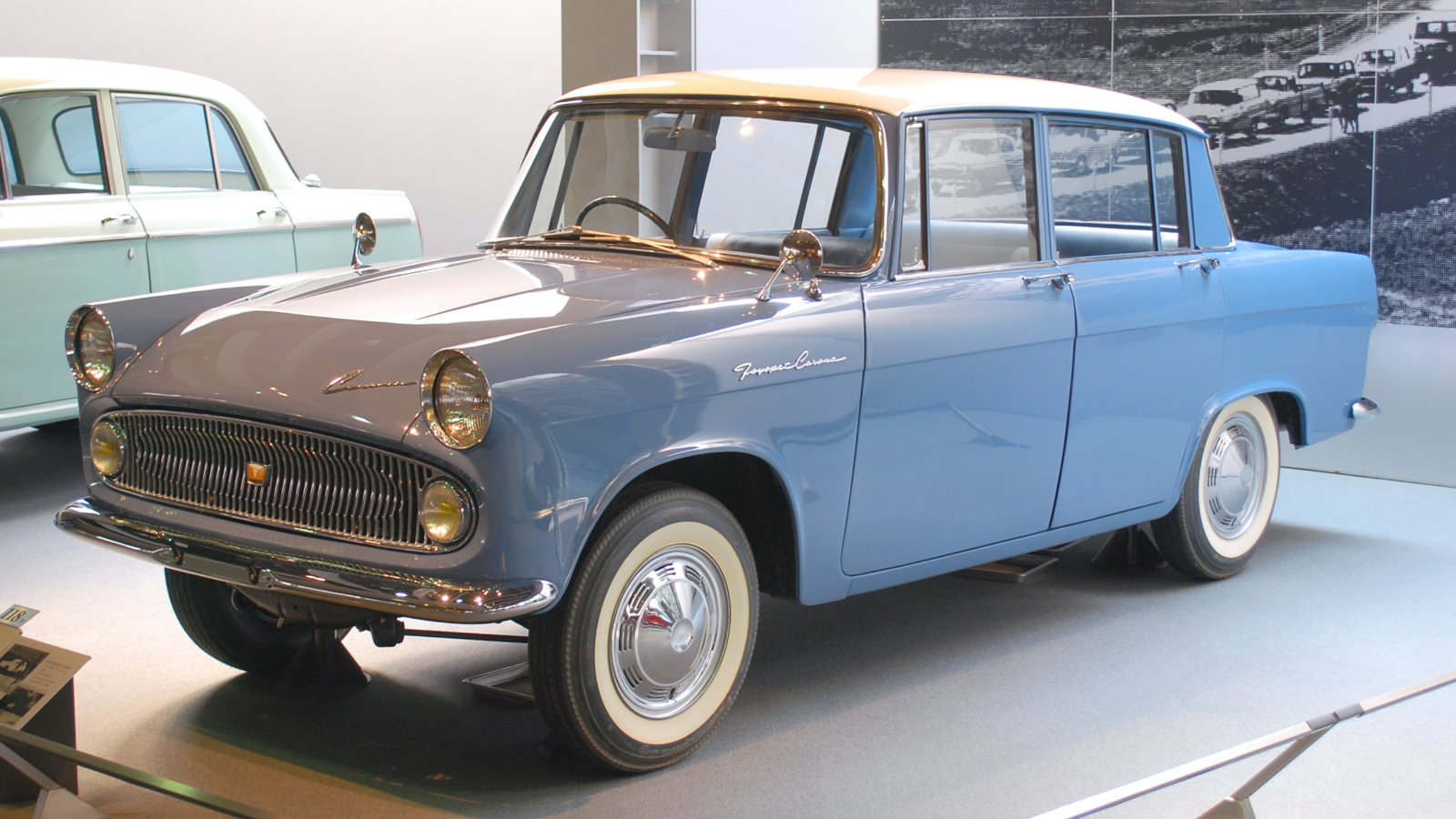
- 1960 Toyopet Corona (PT20, Japan)

Overview
- Model code: T20; T30
- Also called: Toyopet Corona; Toyopet Coronaline; Toyota 1900; Toyota Tiara
- Production: March 1960 – September 1964; April 1963 – unknown (Australia)
- Assembly: Japan: Toyota, Aichi (Motomachi plant); Australia: Port Melbourne (AMI)

Body and chassis
- Body style: 4-door sedan; 3-door station wagon; 2-door coupe utility
- Layout: Front-engine, rear-wheel-drive

Powertrain
- Engine: 1.0 L P I4 (PT20/PT26/PT26V); 1.5 L R I4 (RT20B/RT20D); 1.9 L 3R I4 (RT30L)
- Transmission: 3-speed manual; 2-speed automatic "Toyoglide"

Dimensions
- Wheelbase: 2,400 mm (94.5 in)
- Length: 3,990 mm (157.1 in) (sedan); 4,100 mm (161.4 in) (pickup/van)
- Width: 1,490 mm (58.7 in)
- Height: 1,440 mm (56.7 in) (sedan); 1,490 mm (58.7 in) (pickup/van)
- Curb weight: 940–980 kg (2,072–2,161 lb) (sedan); 1,000–1,040 kg (2,205–2,293 lb) (pickup/van)

This generation of the Corona was also known as the Tiara (in keeping with the crown naming convention) when exported by Toyota Motor Corporation. It was introduced at a critical time for the company in North America. Their first flagship car, the Toyopet Crown, was unsuccessful in the US market, and the Corona was added to offer a choice along with the Land Cruiser. At the time, there was little market for an off-road vehicle like the Land Cruiser. The front mask of the T20 Corona is reminiscent of the 1955–1957 Ford Thunderbird, and shares its appearance with the entry-level offering, called the Toyota Publica.

The Tiara was introduced to sell alongside the Crown, as a smaller companion. Introduced in March 1960, the car was powered by a 45 PS (33 kW) 1.0 L "P" series motor. With a three-speed manual transmission, top speed was a mere 110 km/h (68 mph). In March 1961, Toyota introduced a more powerful 1.5-litre "R" series motor, the same motor from the Crown, and an even larger 1.9-litre engine was added in 1964. Fortunately for Toyota, the problems with the Crown were not seen on the Tiara as the lighter body (180 kg or 400 lb less than the Crown) made the R series engine more sufficient. The Tiara station wagon was seemingly aimed at women, with many of the original brochures featuring only women in a dinner dress as well as playing golf. Nevertheless, it sold better than the Crown and had a lot fewer mechanical problems. The Tiara ended up being the only sedan sold by Toyota in the US until the reworked second-generation Crown appeared. By that time, the Tiara had been redesigned and given the Corona label from the Japanese domestic market. A total of only 318 of these vehicles were sold in the US.

In Australia the Tiara was assembled in Port Melbourne, Victoria by Australian Motor Industries (AMI) starting from 1963.

Two concept cars were shown at the 1963 Tokyo Motor Show – the Corona 1500S Convertible and the Corona 1900S Sporty Sedan. The Corona Sports Coupe was a concept car shown at the 1963 Tokyo Motor Show – it shared little with the Corona except the suspension and the name. The load carrying variants, Coronaline van and pickup (technically a coupé utility) were introduced in July and September 1960 with rigid axle semi-oval leaf spring rear suspension and 500 kg payload capacity, to fill commercial segment below the heavier capacity Toyota Stout.

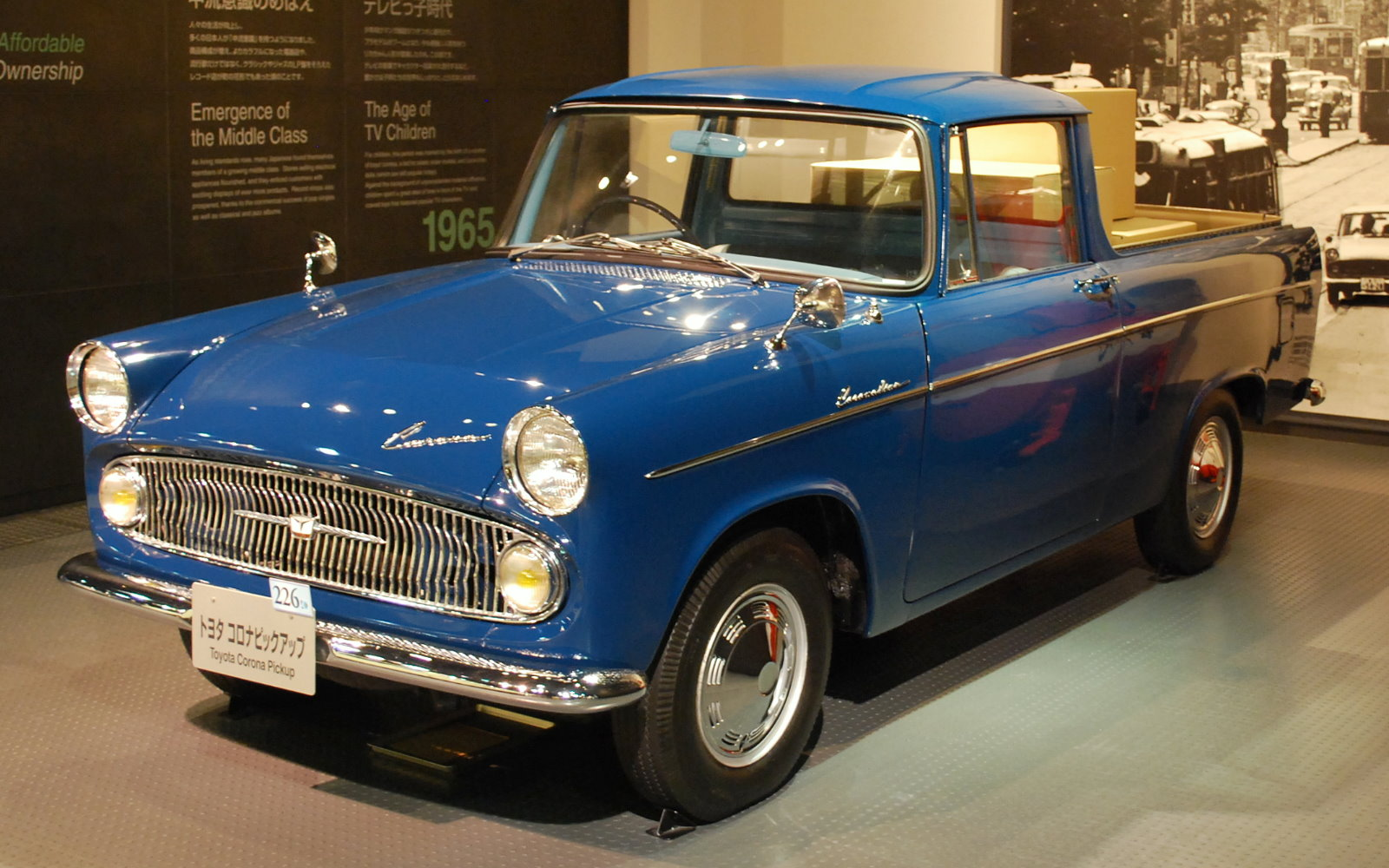
1962 Coronaline (PT26)

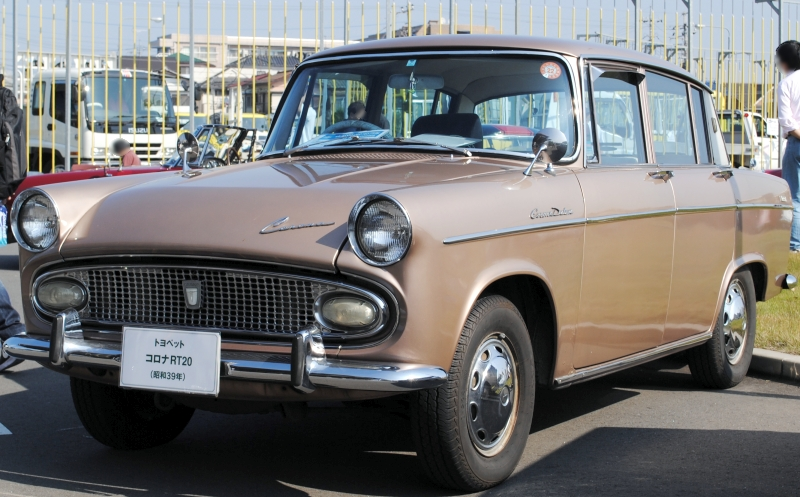
1964 Corona 1500 Deluxe (RT20)

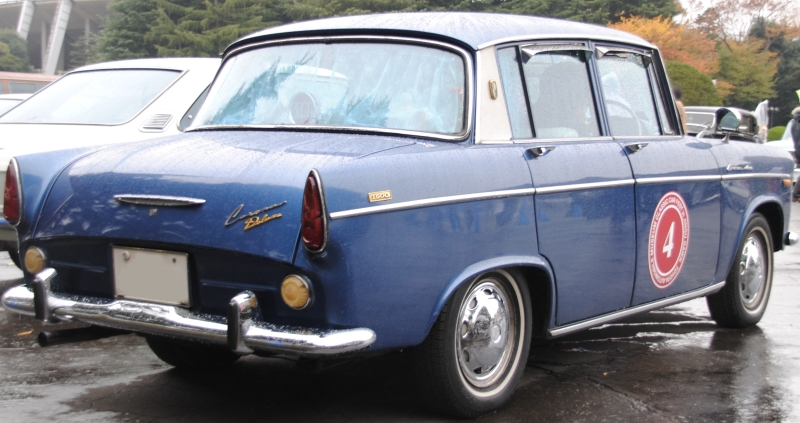
Rear view of 1964 Corona 1500 (RT20)

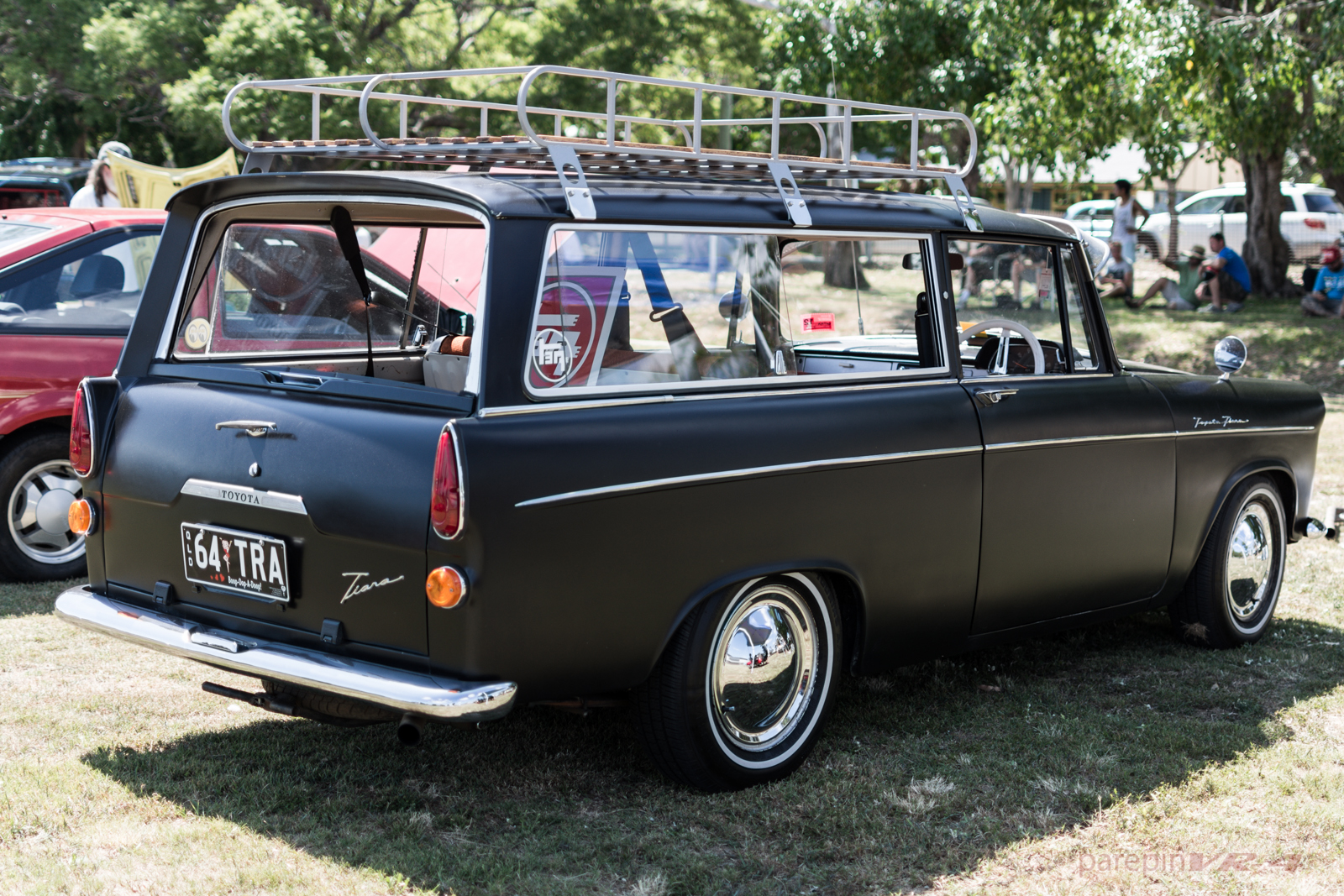
Toyota Tiara Station Wagon (Australian market)

== Third generation (T40, T50; 1964) ==
Third generation
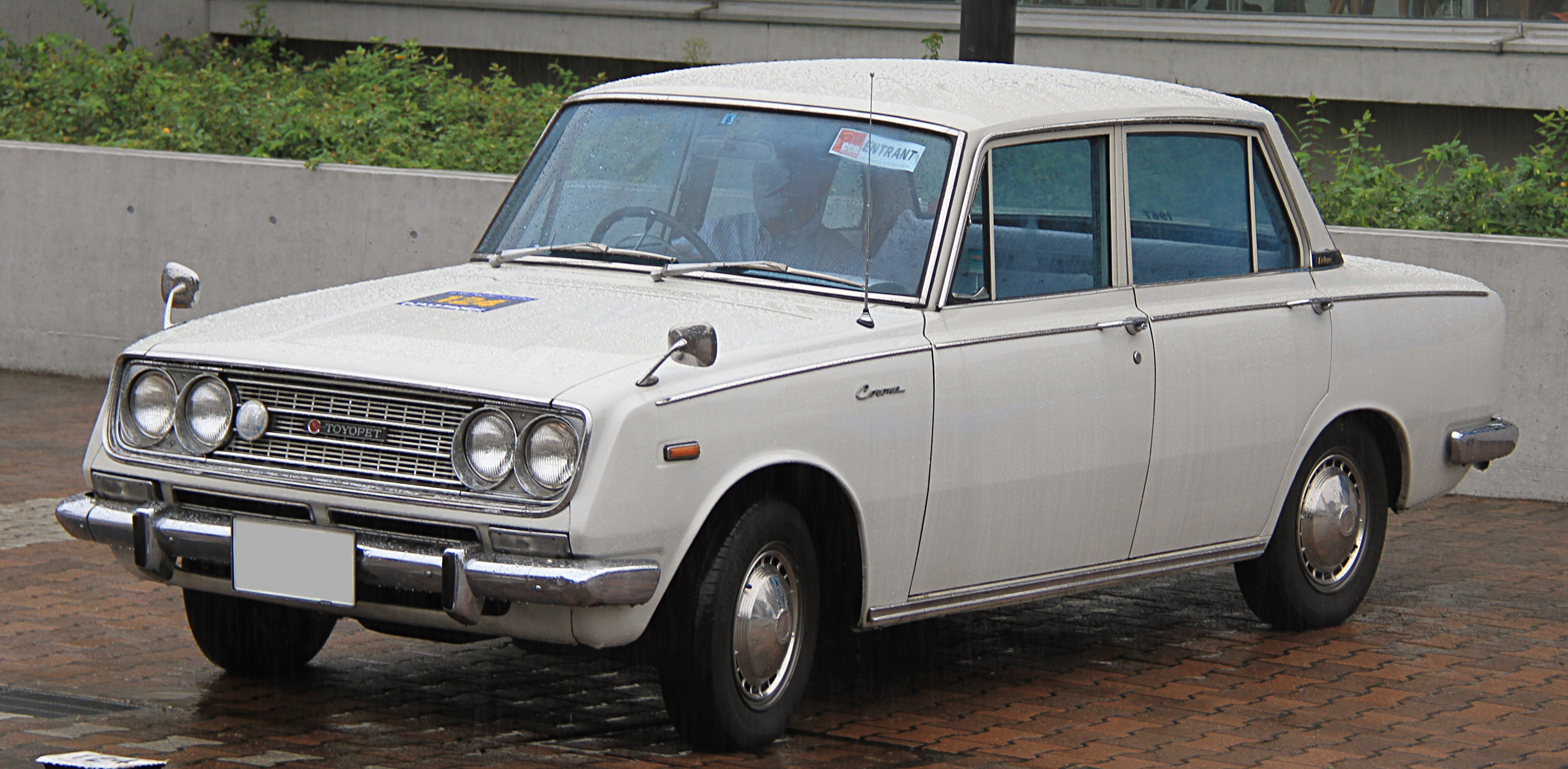
- 1966 Toyopet Corona sedan

Overview
- Model code: T40; T50
- Also called: Toyopet Corona; Toyota 1600GT (RT55)
- Production: September 1964 – January 1970 (Japan); July 1966 – May 1970 (South Korea)
- Assembly: Japan: Toyota, Aichi (Motomachi plant); Japan: Kariya, Aichi (Toyota Auto Body); Australia: Port Melbourne, Victoria (AMI); South Korea: Bupyeong-gu (Shinjin Motor); New Zealand: Christchurch (Steel Brothers' Motor Assemblies); Philippines: Parañaque (Delta Motors Corporation)

Body and chassis
- Body style: 4-door sedan; 2-door hardtop coupe; 3-door van; 5-door station wagon/van; 5-door hatchback; 2-door coupe utility; 4-door double cab pickup
- Layout: Front-engine, rear-wheel-drive

Powertrain
- Engine: 1.2 L 2P I4 (PT40/46/46V); 1.3 L 3P I4 (PT41/47); 1.5 L 2R I4 (RT40/46/50/56); 1.6 L 4R I4 (RT40/51); 1.6 L 9R I4 (RT55); 1.6 L 7R/7R-B I4 (RT41/53/54); 1.6 L 12R I4 (Australia); 1.9 L 3R I4 (RT43/52)
- Transmission: 2-speed Toyoglide automatic; 3-speed manual; 4-speed manual all-synchromesh; 5-speed manual (1600GT GT-5)

Dimensions
- Wheelbase: 2,420 mm (95.3 in) (sedan); 2,450 mm (96.5 in) (van/pickup)
- Length: 4,065–4,110 mm (160.0–161.8 in) (sedan); 4,110–4,125 mm (161.8–162.4 in) (coupe); 4,190 mm (165.0 in) (pickup); 4,215 mm (165.9 in) (van)
- Width: 1,550 mm (61.0 in); 1,565 mm (61.6 in) (coupe)
- Height: 1,375 mm (54.1 in) (coupe); 1,420 mm (55.9 in) (sedan/hatchback); 1,435 mm (56.5 in) (pickup); 1,465 mm (57.7 in) (van)
- Curb weight: 900–960 kg (1,984–2,116 lb) (sedan); 930–980 kg (2,050–2,161 lb) (van/pickup); 960–1,010 kg (2,116–2,227 lb) (coupe); 990–1,005 kg (2,183–2,216 lb) (hatchback)

The third generation was introduced September 1964, one month before the 1964 Summer Olympics. It was available in sedan, two-door hardtop, three-door van, five-door station wagon (also as a van), two coupé utility variants and a five-door hatchback. The 40–43 series were reserved for sedans, while commercial vehicles (and wagons) were in the 46 and 47 series. Hardtops received 50–55 series model codes, while 56 was reserved for the five-door hatchback. The 1965 model marked a return of Toyota to the American market after withdrawing there temporarily in 1961.

Toyota conducted a public demonstration of the new Corona's performance on the Meishin Expressway, where the new model was tested to 100,000 kilometres (62,137.1 mi), and was able to sustain speeds of 140 km/h (87 mph). Toyota released the Corona one year after the debut of the Corona's traditional competitor, the Nissan Bluebird. In November 1966, Toyota introduced the Corolla, a smaller vehicle to address the market that needed a more fuel efficient vehicle, allowing the Corona to increase in size. 0–97 km/h (0–60 mph) time was 15.1 seconds.

Originally, commercial models (three-door van, coupé utility, and double-cab coupé utility) utilized the 1,198 cc 2P engine, with 55 PS (40 kW) at 5,000 rpm. This allowed for a maximum load of 500 kg (1,102 lb) for the two-seater versions and 300 kg (661 lb) for the five-seaters. Heavier loads were better accommodated by the Toyota Stout, while larger commercial grade trucks became available at Toyota Diesel Store locations. 1967 also saw the debut of a cab over van equipped for both commercial and commuting duties using the Corona engines, called the Toyota HiAce, offering more payload than the Corona was suited for.

The coupé utility was produced by the former Central Motors between October 1964 and August 1968. In July 1965 the 2-door hardtop coupé body style was introduced.

In 1966, the Toyota Corolla underwent its first facelift, and again in 1967.

Top speed for the 1.2-litre Corona is 110 km/h (68 mph). In January 1967 this also became available as a five-door van. In April 1967, the larger and more powerful 3P (1.35-litre) and 2R (1.5-litre) engines became available, replacing the lesser 2P in most markets. Power of these were 77 and 65 PS (57 and 48 kW) respectively.

The Toyota automatic transmission, marketed as Toyoglide, was introduced on this version of the Corona. The 4R (12R in Australian versions) engine that had a displacement of 1587 cc was equipped with a twin SU carburetor (Australian models with 12R engine had one double barrel Aisin downdraft carburetor), and was capable of 90 bhp (67 kW; 91 PS). Disc brakes were also introduced for the front wheels. Exports of this Corona proved popular in the US and Europe, with increased engine performance and durability improvements over previous versions. In September 1967 alone, Toyota produced 80,000 cars, with 30,000 being Coronas.

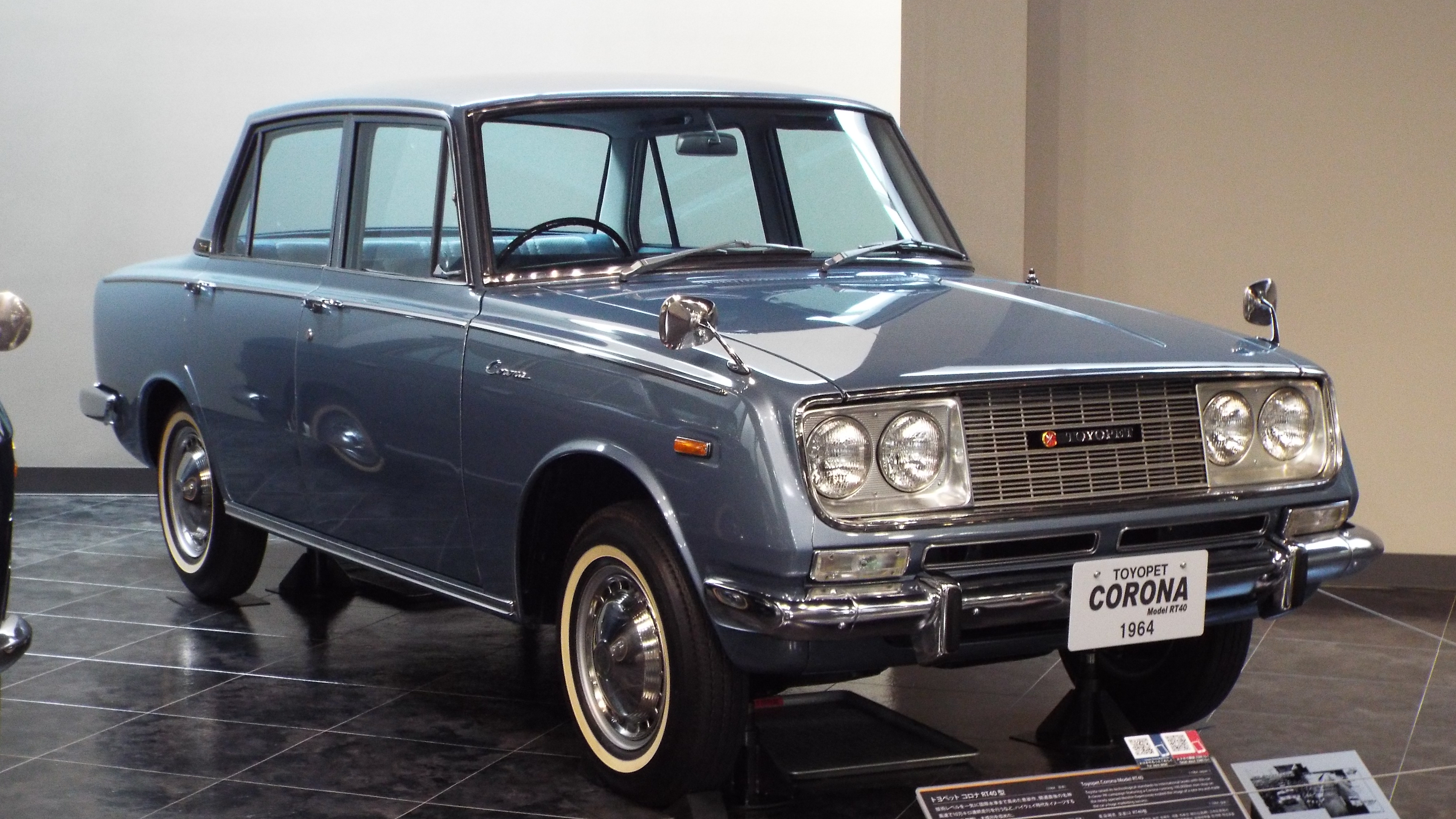
1964 Toyopet Corona sedan

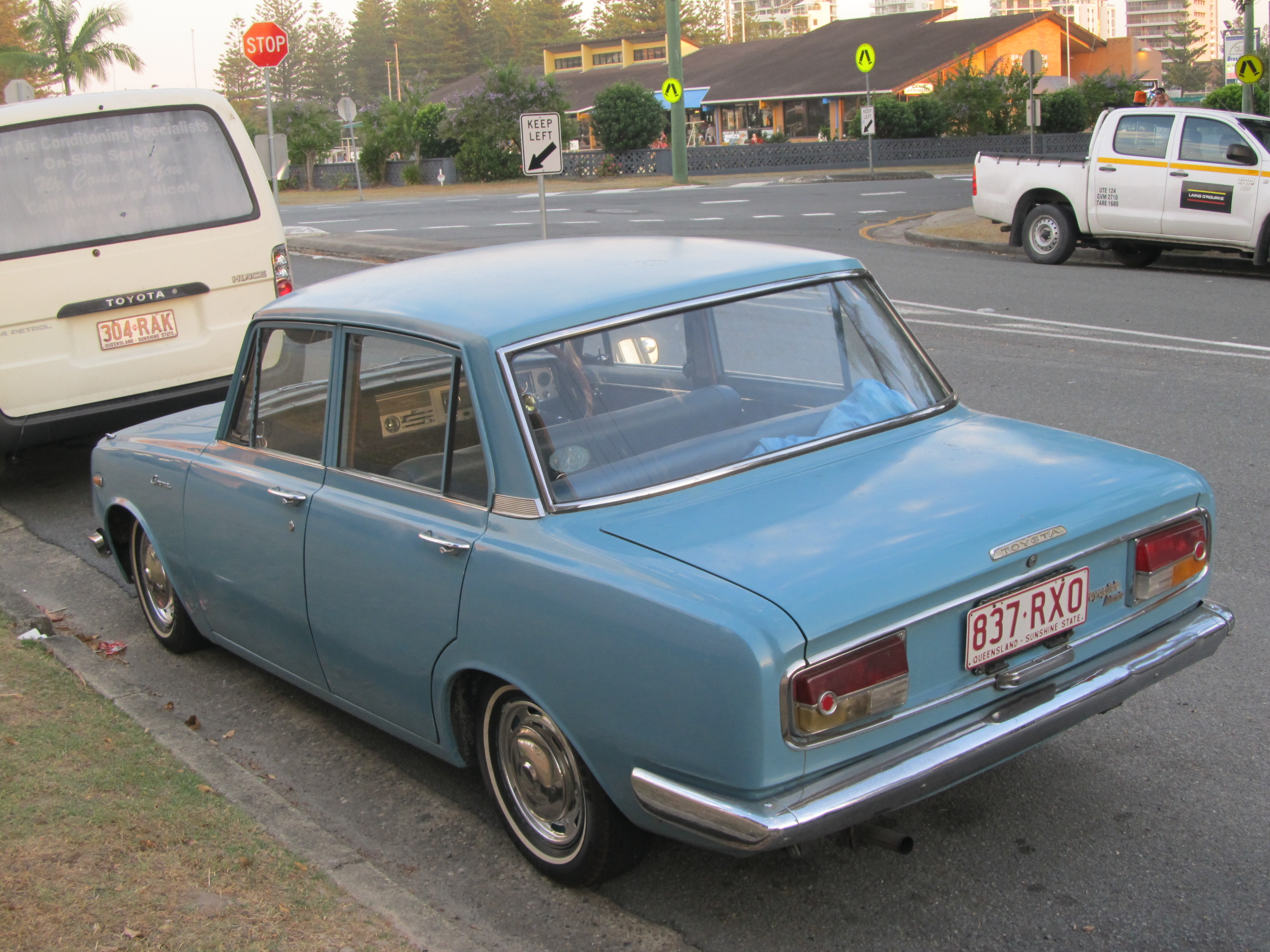
1966 facelift Corona sedan (RT40, Australia)

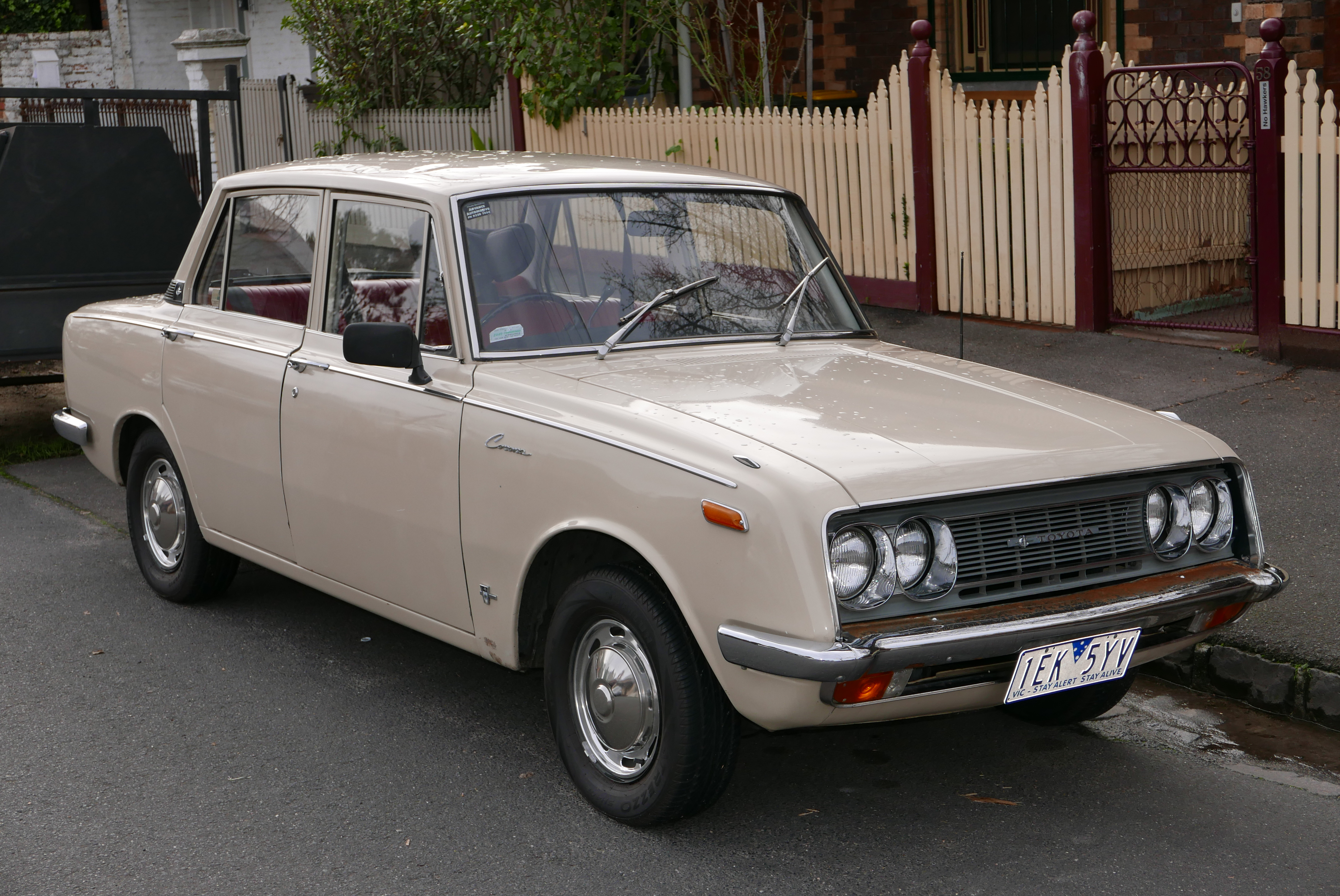
Second facelift Corona sedan (RT40, Australia)

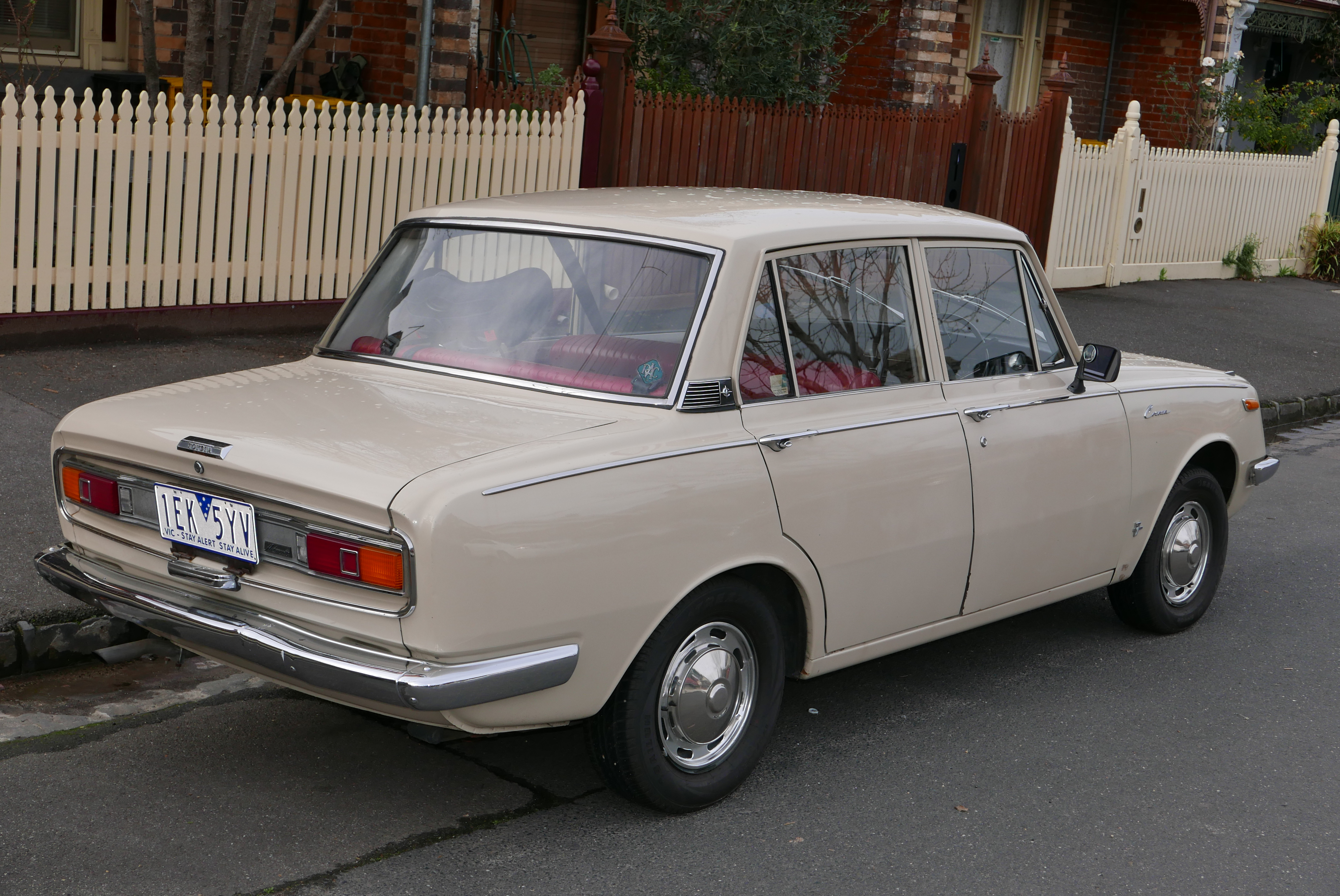
Second facelift Corona sedan (RT40, Australia)

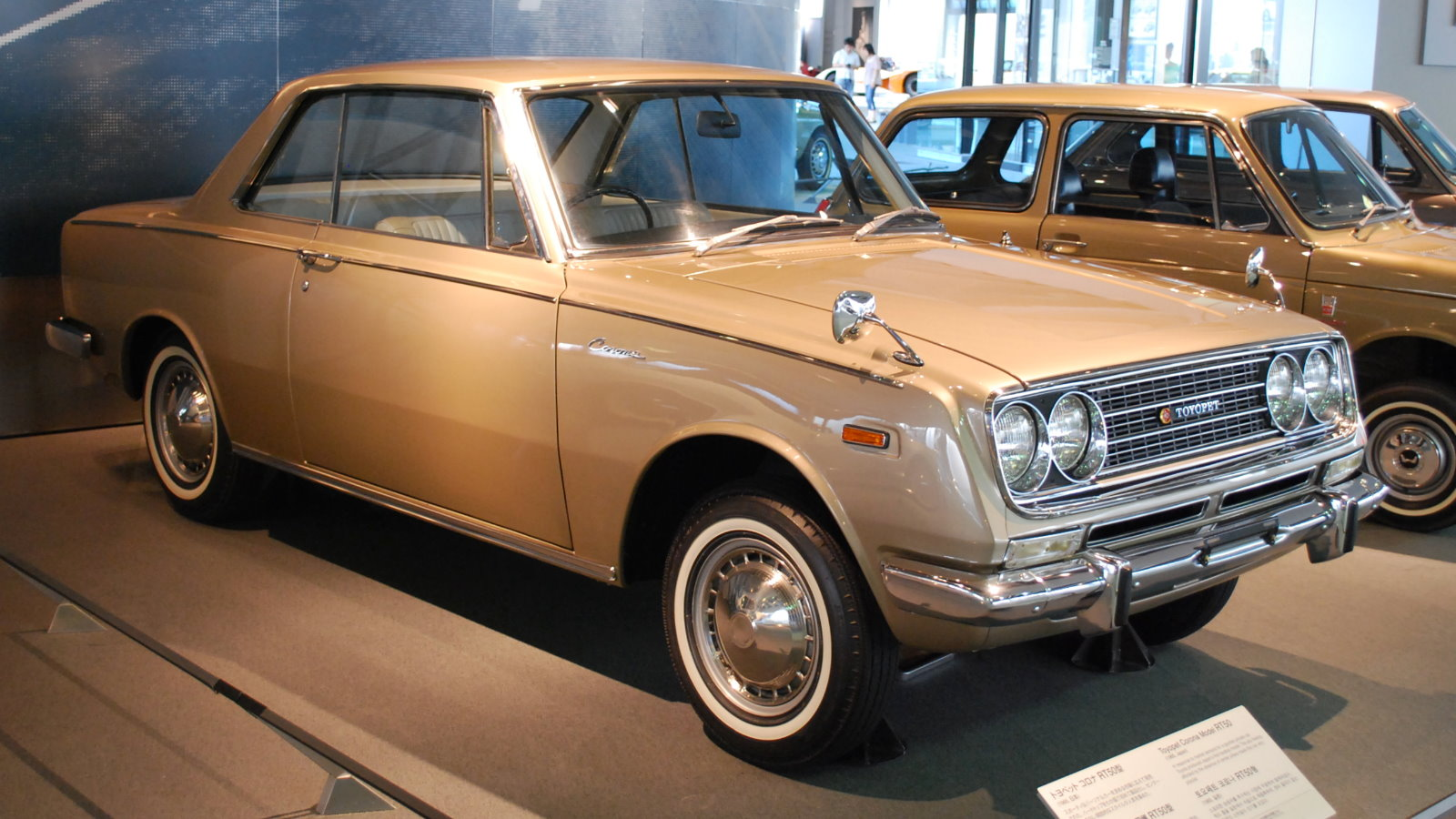
Corona 1600S hardtop coupe

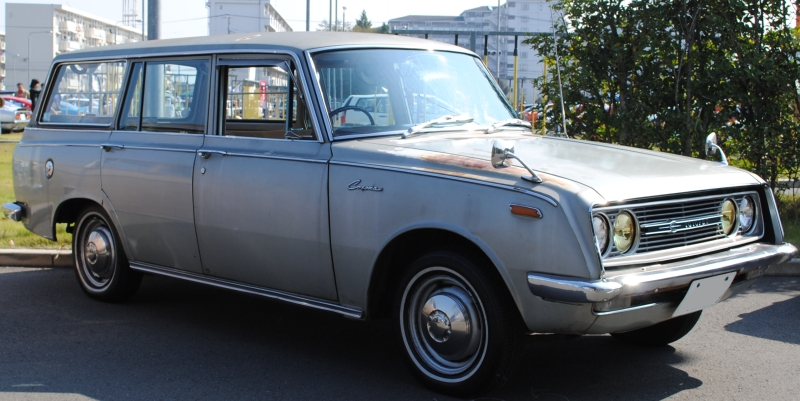
Corona wagon

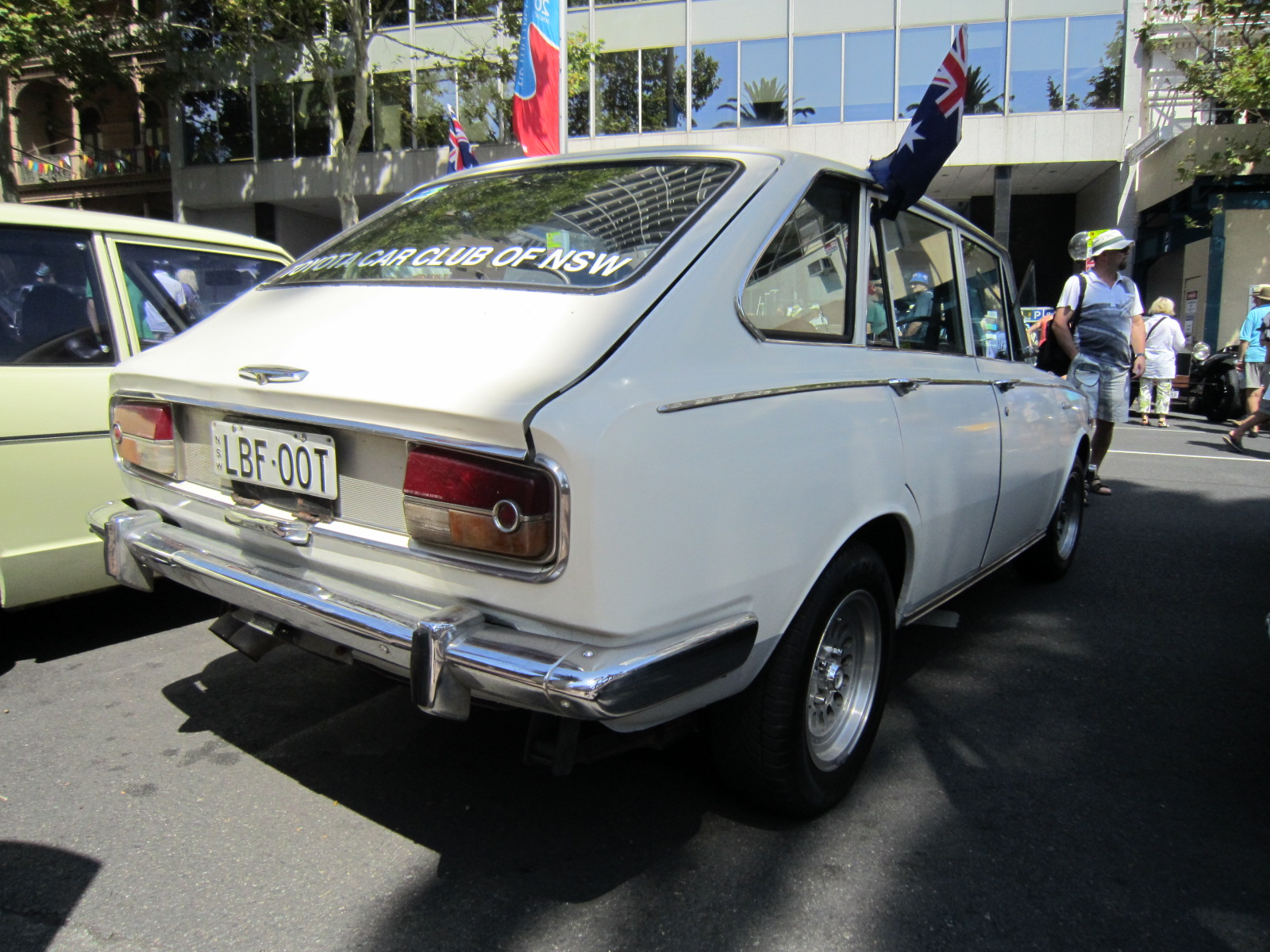
Rear view of Corona (RT56) hatchback

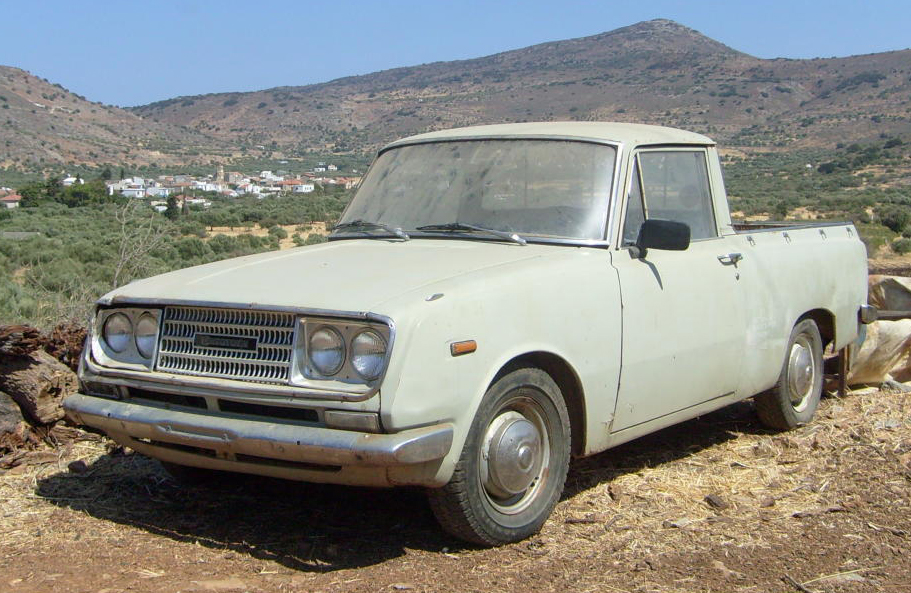
Corona coupé utility (single cab)

=== Toyota 1600GT (RT55) ===
In August 1967 Toyota installed the 1,587 cc (96.8 cu in) DOHC 9R engine in the RT55 1600GT. This engine used the 4R engine block borrowed from the Corona 1600S with a Yamaha built DOHC head derived from the 2.0 L 3M engine in the exotic 2000GT that was introduced May 1967, and produced 110 PS (81 kW). The 1600GT was offered as a more affordable junior version of the larger, more exclusive 2000GT. In production for only 13 months, 2,222 examples of the 1600GT were manufactured in Bellatrix Yellow, Pegasus White, Solar Red, and Thunder Silver metallic – all colours that were also offered on the 2000GT.

The introduction of a two-door hardtop coupe reflected the growing prosperity of the Japanese economy. While the coupé offered some practical items like a spacious trunk and a rear seatback that folded down for additional items, it was offered as a single-occupant car that could accommodate three other passengers. A bench seat was not offered for front-seat passengers, and a console was blended into the dashboard, accommodating 4-speed or optional 5-speed. Due to its sporting nature, no automatic transmission was offered, and a limited-slip differential was standard equipment. The interior only came in black, with reclining front bucket seats. The steering wheel matched the one used in the 2000GT, but the outer rim was wood-grained plastic. It was Toyota's answer to the Isuzu Bellet GT, the Nissan Bluebird SSS and the Prince Skyline 2000GTB. While it used the Corona hardtop coupé body, it was not known as the Corona 1600GT, sharing a naming convention to the larger 2000GT.

It inspired future generations of performance-oriented coupes and sports cars offered, to begin with the Crown hardtop coupé in October 1968, the Corona Mark II GSS, the Celica GT, and the Carina GT in 1970 and the Toyota Corolla Levin and Sprinter Trueno in 1972, while a 2.0-litre DOHC engine continued to be offered in subsequent Corona GT coupés until 1983. On the front fenders, grilles were installed, and the inverted triangle found on the grille of the 2000GT is also installed on the 1600GT's grille.

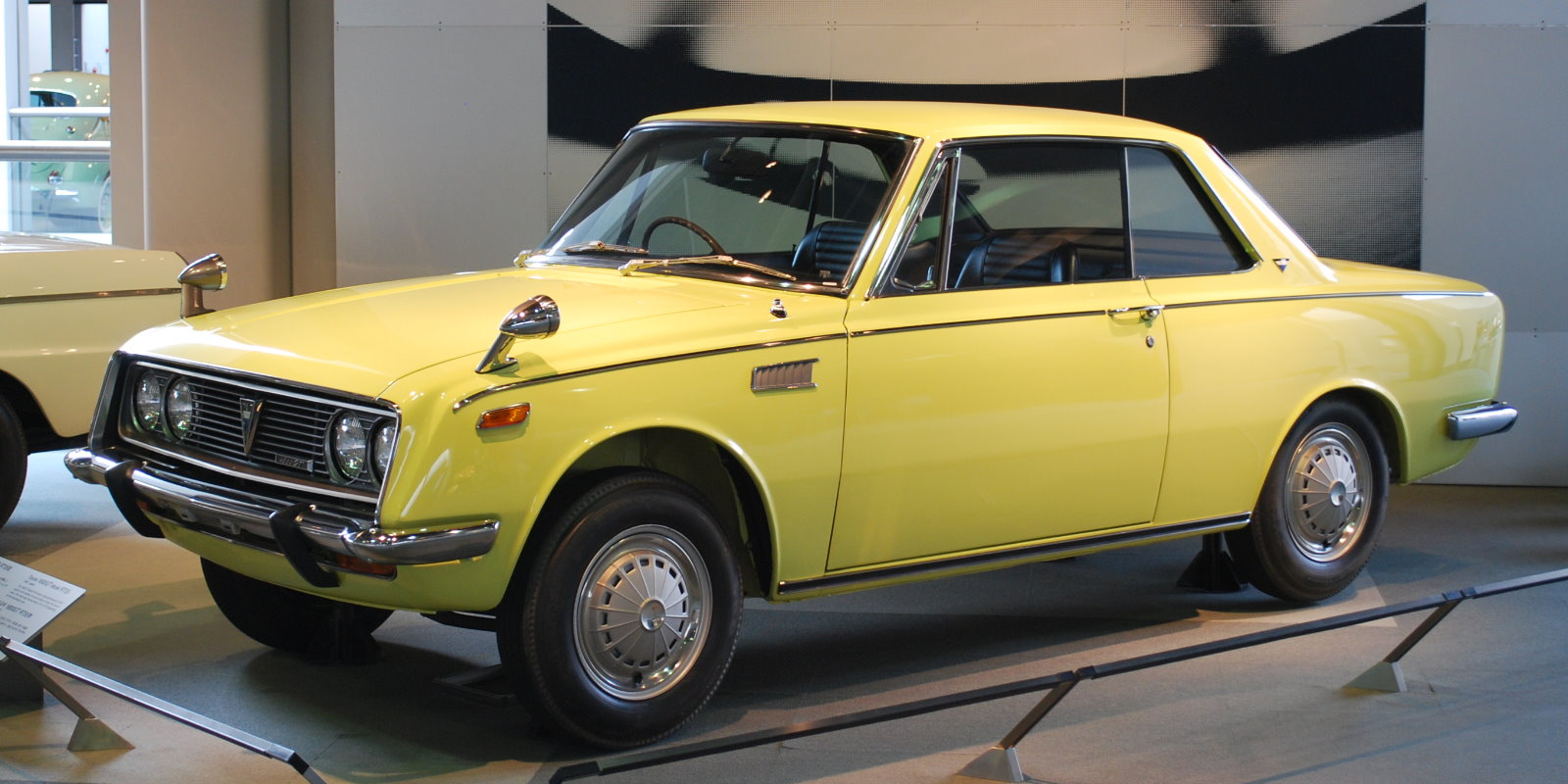
Front-left view of 1967 1600GT (RT55) hardtop coupé

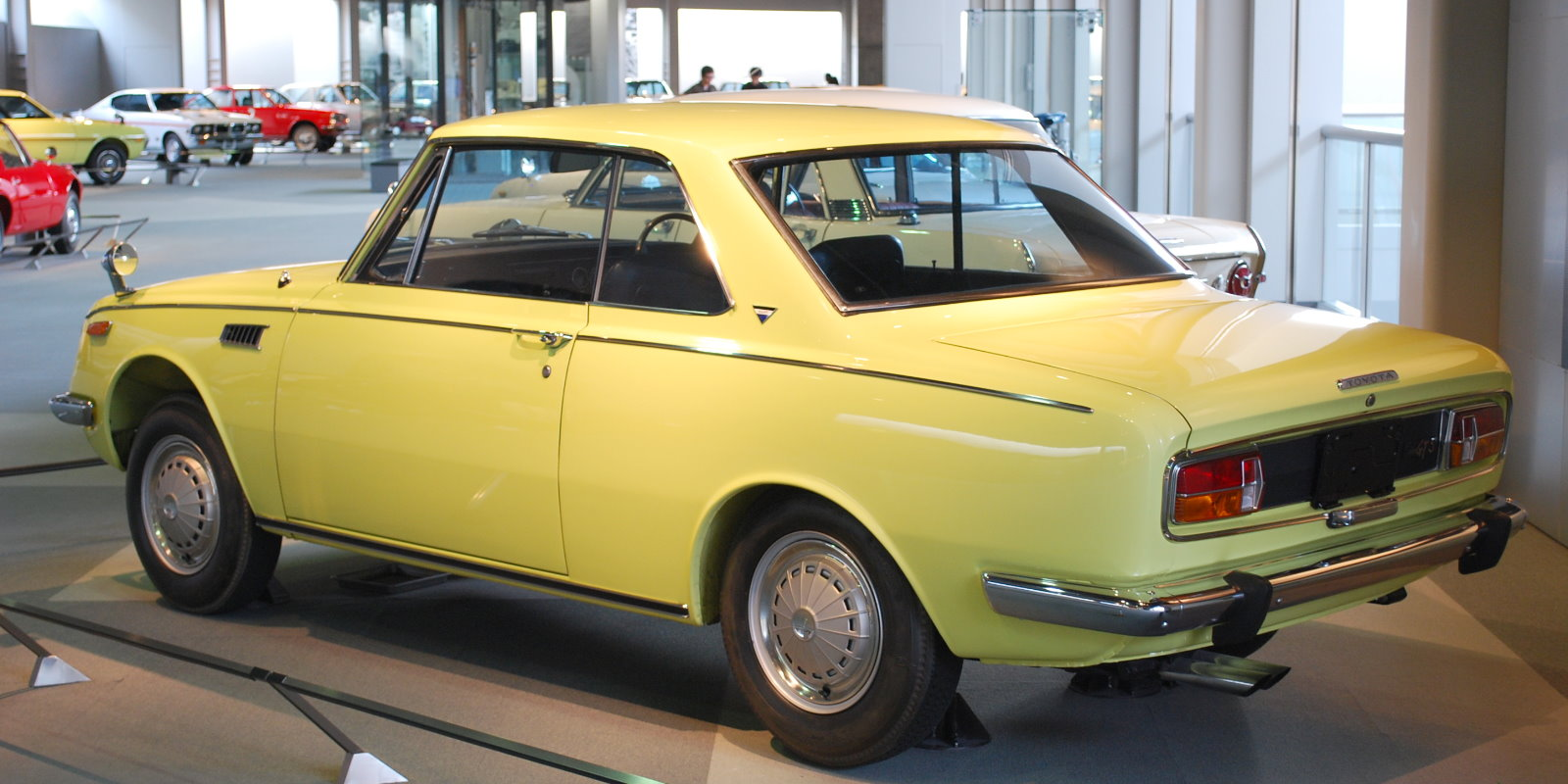
Rear-left view of 1967 1600GT (RT55) hardtop coupé

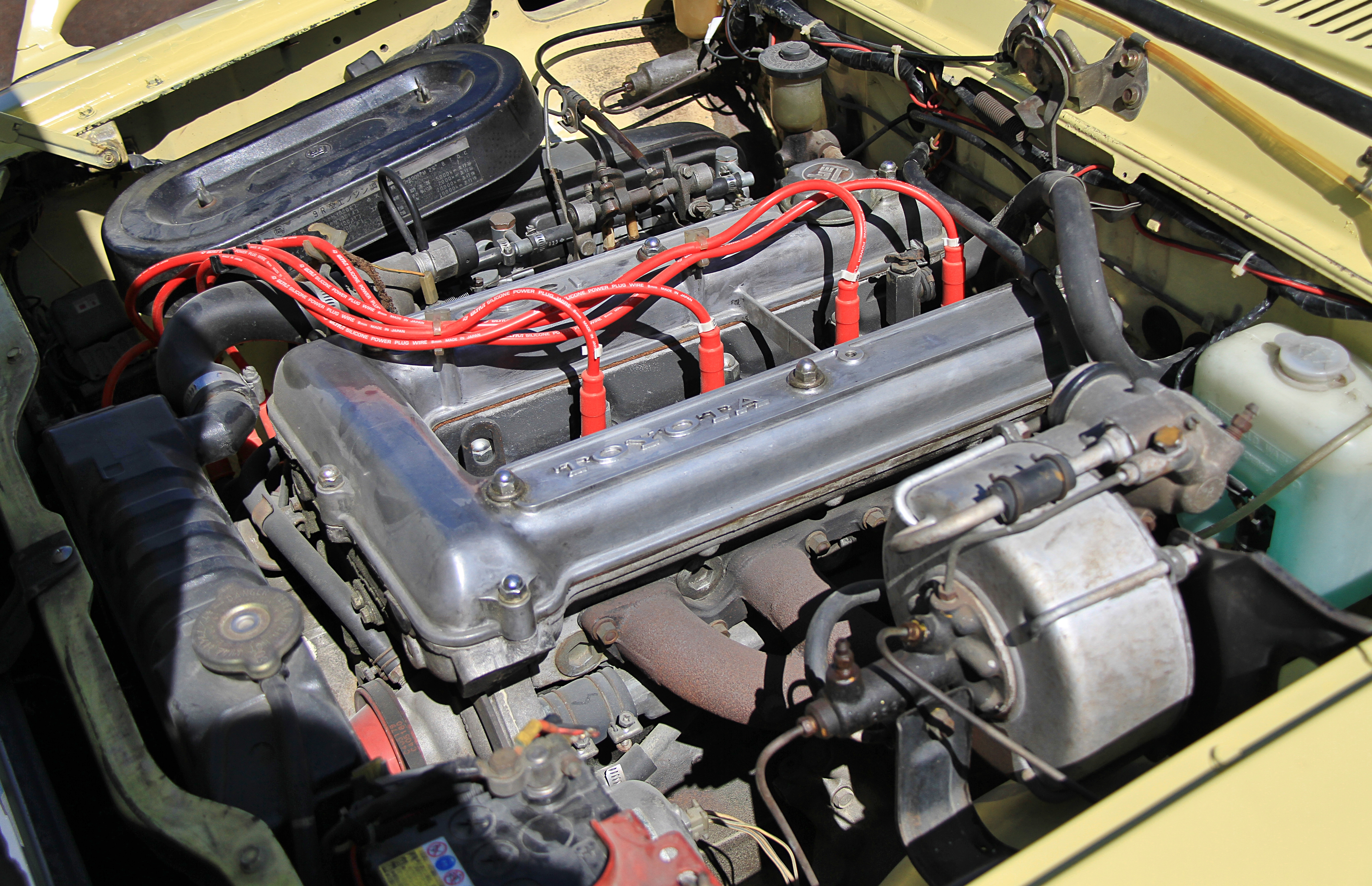
9R engine installed in 1600GT

=== Foreign assembly ===
The Corona was the first Toyota assembled in New Zealand, from February 1967 at Steel Brothers' Motor Assemblies in Christchurch. It was also built by Shinjin Motor in South Korea from 1966 until 1972. Shinjin Motor was a predecessor to Daewoo and soon switched to assembling General Motors products. The Corona was also assembled by Australian Motor Industries in Melbourne, with the 12R engine.

South African assemblies commenced in 1966, with the car reaching a fifteenth position on the 1967 sales charts.

=== Corona Mark II (T60, T70; 1968) ===
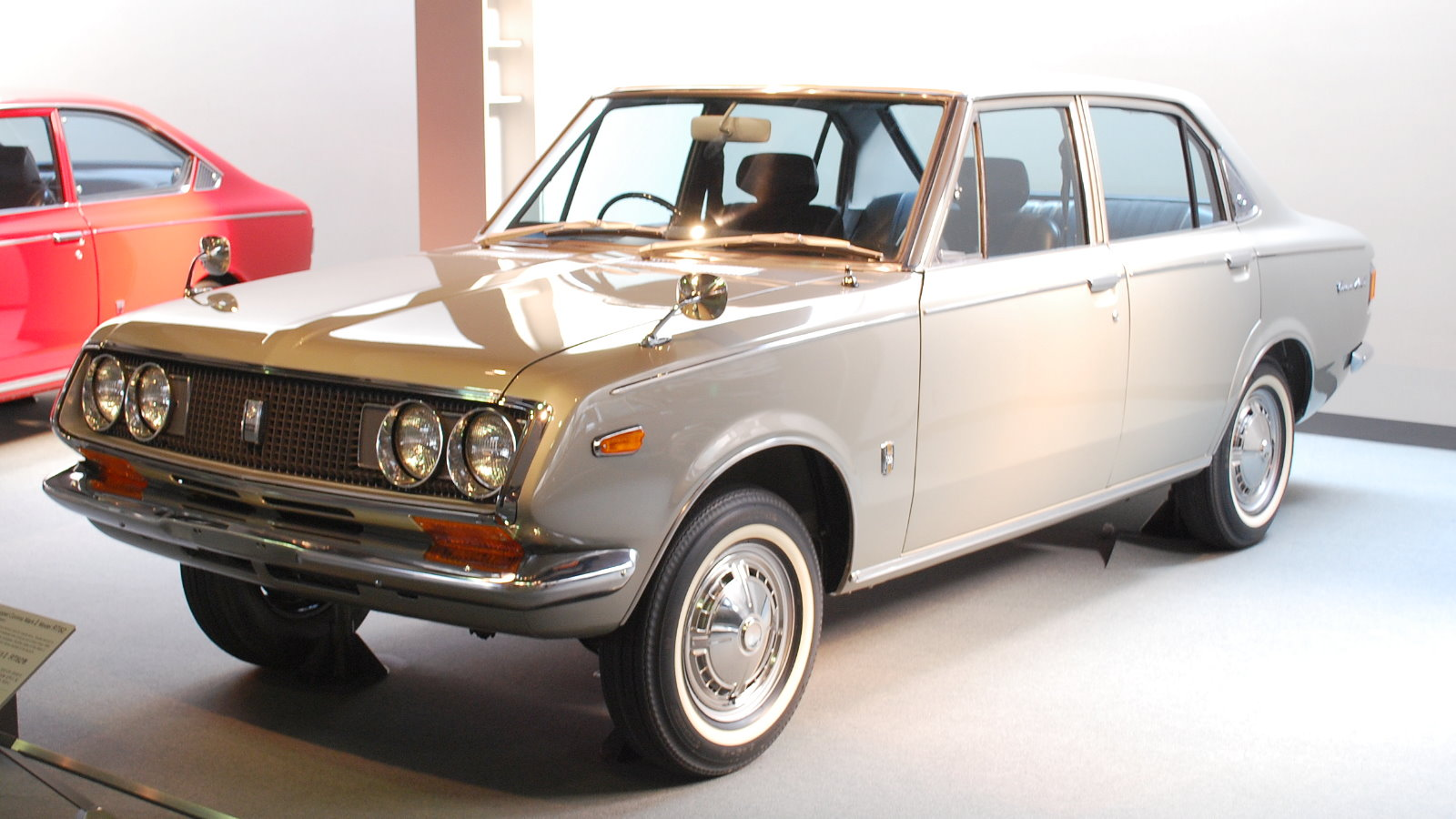
1968 Corona Mark II

September 1968 saw the release of a larger model called the Corona Mark II. It was a slightly larger vehicle than the Corona with a higher level of equipment offered at the time, sharing some of the features of the larger Crown, but taking the top position at Toyopet Store locations.

The Corona Mark II is longer, at 4,295 mm (169.1 in) over the Corona's length of 162.4 in (4,125 mm) for the sedan, and the coupe, with a width of 1,610 mm (63.4 in) in comparison to 61 in (1,549 mm) for the sedan and coupe. The height of the Mark II is lower at 1,405 mm (55.3 in) over 1,420 mm (55.9 in) for the sedan, but higher at 1,374 mm (54.1 in) for the coupé.

After 1972, this was spun off as a separate platform, eventually dispensing with the "Corona" part of the name.

== Fourth generation (T80, T90; 1970) ==
Fourth generation
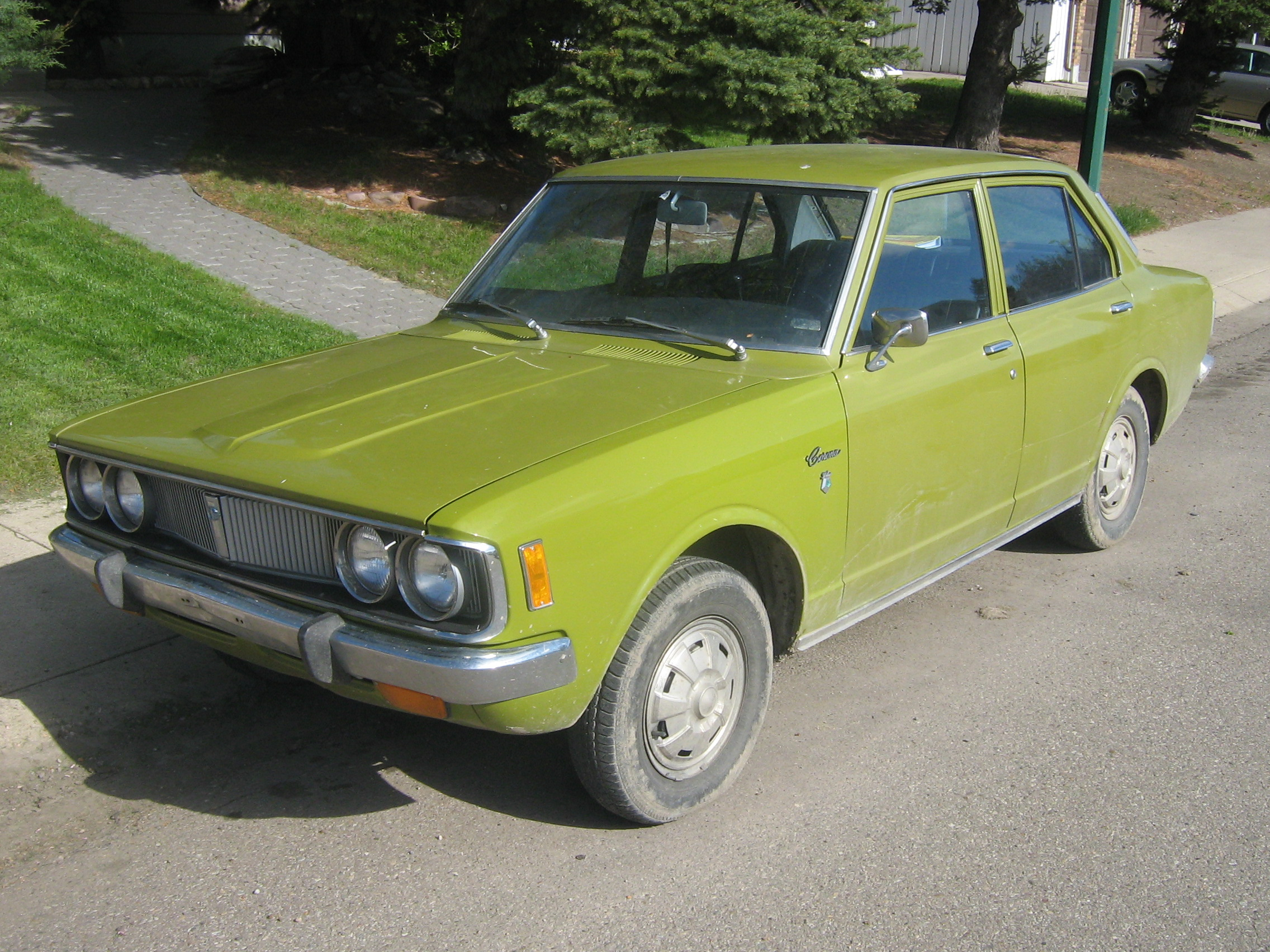
- Toyota Corona Sedan (Canada)

Overview
- Model code: T80; T90
- Production: February 1970 – July 1973 (Japan); June 1970 – November 1972 (South Korea)
- Assembly: Japan: Toyota, Aichi (Motomachi plant); Australia: Port Melbourne, Victoria (AMI); New Zealand: Christchurch (Steel's Motor Assemblies under contract to Consolidated Motor Distributors); South Korea: Bupyeong-gu (Shinjin Motor; New Corona); Indonesia: Sunter, North Jakarta (Multi Astra); Philippines: Parañaque (Delta Motors Corporation)

Body and chassis
- Body style: 4-door sedan; 5-door station wagon; 2-door coupé
- Layout: Front-engine, rear-wheel-drive

Powertrain
- Engine: 1.3 L 3P I4 (PT86V); 1.5 L 2R I4 (RT80/90/86V); 1.6 L 12R I4 (RT81/91/87V); 1.6 L 7R I4 (RT82); 1.7 L 6R I4 (RT84/94/88V); 1.9 L 8R I4 (RT83/93); 2.0 L 18R I4 (RT85/95/89V)
- Transmission: 3-speed manual; 4-speed manual; 5-speed manual; 2-speed automatic; 3-speed automatic

Dimensions
- Wheelbase: 2,430 mm (95.7 in)
- Length: 4,170 mm (164.2 in) (sedan); 4,260 mm (167.7 in) (wagon)
- Width: 1,570 mm (61.8 in)
- Height: 1,400 mm (55.1 in) (sedan); 1,435 mm (56.5 in) (wagon)
- Curb weight: 945 kg (2,083 lb) (sedan); 1,005 kg (2,216 lb) (wagon)

The T80 series Corona was introduced February 1970 and was a complete redesign, and was developed on a separate platform from the Toyota Corona Mark II, which became a larger, more comfortable and powerful car, where the Corona remained focused on fuel economy. Body styles were further reduced to a two-door hardtop coupé, a four-door sedan and station wagon. The engine continued to use an OHV on base level vehicles, and SOHC on better equipped versions and most of the two-door coupés. The engines used in the Mark II were often shared with the Corona.

Trim levels originally offered were the 1500 standard or DX, 1600 DX, and the 1600 SL (although the 1900 cc 8R engine was offered in North America and South Africa). The 1.5 offered 77 PS (57 kW), while the 1.6 has 85 or 100 PS (63 or 74 kW) depending on the spec. A slight change occurred in January 1971, when the 2R and 7R engines (RT80/82/86V) were replaced by the more powerful 12R and 6R units (RT81/84/87V). At the same time, the larger 1.9-litre RT83 was added to the lineup. A plethora of transmissions were offered, with a three-speed manual as standard. A four-speed manual with a floor-mounted lever was also available, as were two- or three-speed "Toyoglide" automatic transmissions, with the three-speed available with a floor-mounted shifter. Later on a five-speed manual was also made available in the sportier versions.

The Corona was redesigned in August 1971, with the low-mounted wraparound turn signals removed and a new grille. Another, milder yet restyle appeared in August 1972, including new grilles and hubcaps. The Hardtop gained a two-litre engine at this time. Among the mechanical updates were electronic fuel injection installed on the 18R-E with a SOHC engine design that appeared in the two-door coupé. The 18R-B had twin SU Carburetors, with an electronically controlled automatic transmission, labeled ECT. Four-cylinder engine choices were pushrod 1.35 (van Standard only), 1.5, and 1.6-litre engines, and overhead-cam 1.7, 1.9, and 2.0-litre petrol units. Vans (wagons) were sold with 1.35 3P or 1.5-litre 2R engines for the first year, but the 1.5 was replaced by the 1.6-litre 12R engine in January 1971. The 1.7-litre 6R engine was added to the lineup in September 1970, and became available in the van in September 1971. North America only received the Corona wagon in July 1972 (and only for the 1973 model year), as the two-litre RT89.

A performance oriented in-house competitor called the Toyota Carina, close in size to the Corona and based on the Toyota Celica platform, was introduced in 1970. It was available at a different dealership sales channel called Toyota Store. This generation of Corona was available at dealerships called Toyopet Store. The Corona pick-up was no longer manufactured due to the introduction of the Hilux in 1969. Along with the August 1972 facelift, the Corona received the 2.0-litre engine which appeared in the 2000SL and the 2000SR with fuel injection. The 7R-engined RT82 was short-lived in Japan, only being available between February and September 1970, but in other markets it may have remained available until the introduction of the next Corona.

In the United States, the 1970s were probably the Corona's high point, helped by the fuel crises of 1973 and 1979. Competition for sales continued from the Nissan Bluebird, and from a new competitor from the Mazda RX-2 in 1971, with an introduction to the US in 1972. As with the prior generation models offered were limited to the four-door sedan and the hardtop coupe for most of the run, with the wagon added only for 1973, the final model year of the generation.

These models were assembled in New Zealand (by Steel's) and Australia (Australian Motor Industries or AMI). NZ models initially had a 1.5-litre OHV engine and four-speed manual and then the 6R 1.7-litre OHC engine. After the first facelift (new nose and tail, square instead of round instrument housings) for 1972, the 6R engine was again used. The 1972 facelift (another new grille) saw two models – 1.6-litre OHV with three-speed column-shift manual and bench front seat and 1.7-litre four-speed floor shift manual and high-back buckets. This version was badged 1700SE.

Australian RT81s used the 1.6-litre OHV engine and four-speed manual. Local content was much higher than the NZ cars with local instruments and heater which meant, surprisingly for the climate, there were no centre air vents. The facelift AMI assembled model with the revised grille was released in November 1972, lasting to March 1974.

A modified Corona was shown at the 1970 Tokyo Motor Show as the Electronics Car. Based on the Corona Hardtop 1700SL, it showed many electronic innovations but was not put into production.

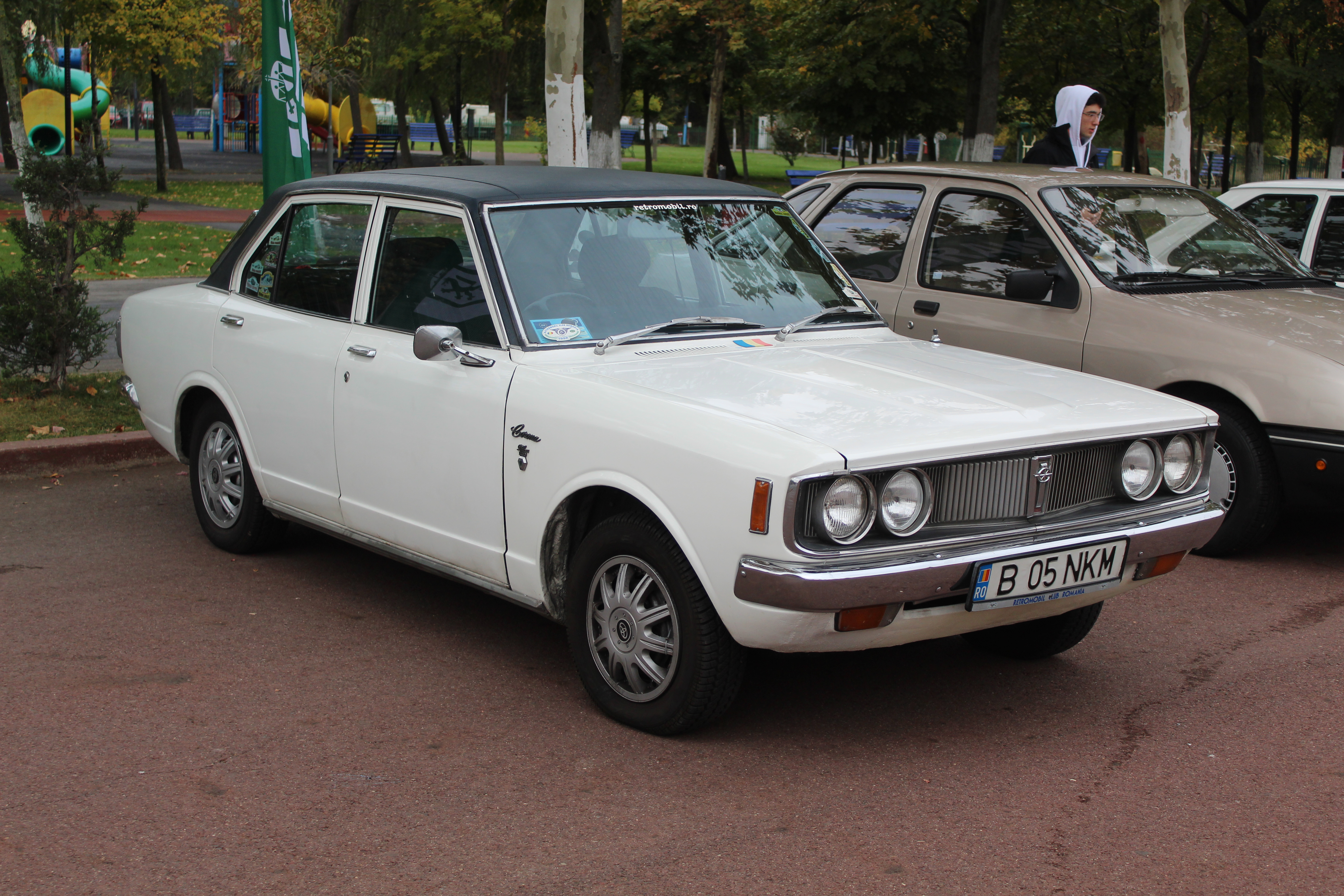
1972 Toyopet Corona (RT81) 1700 sedan (JDM)

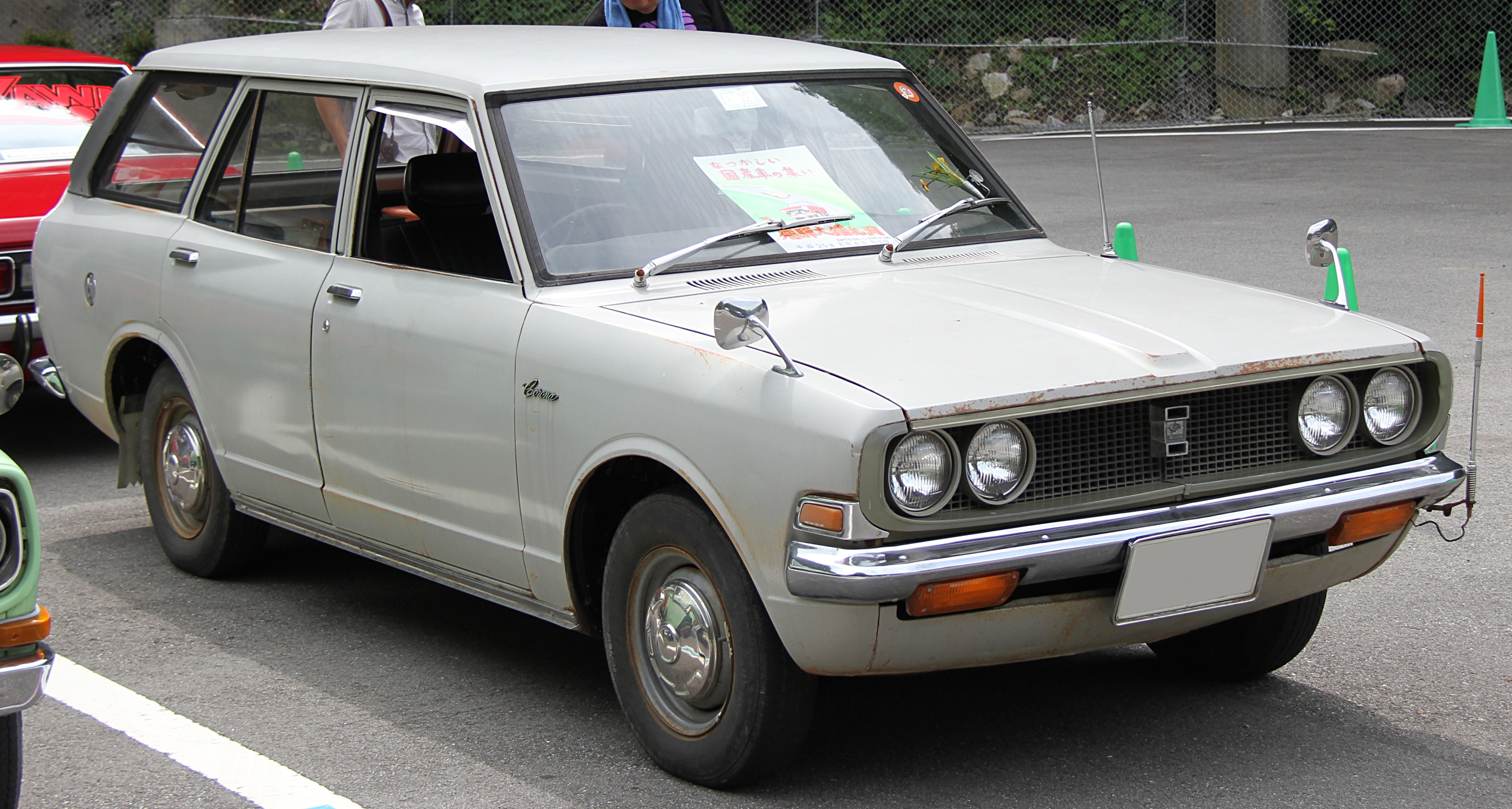
Toyopet Corona Van (T80), pre-facelift 1970–71 model

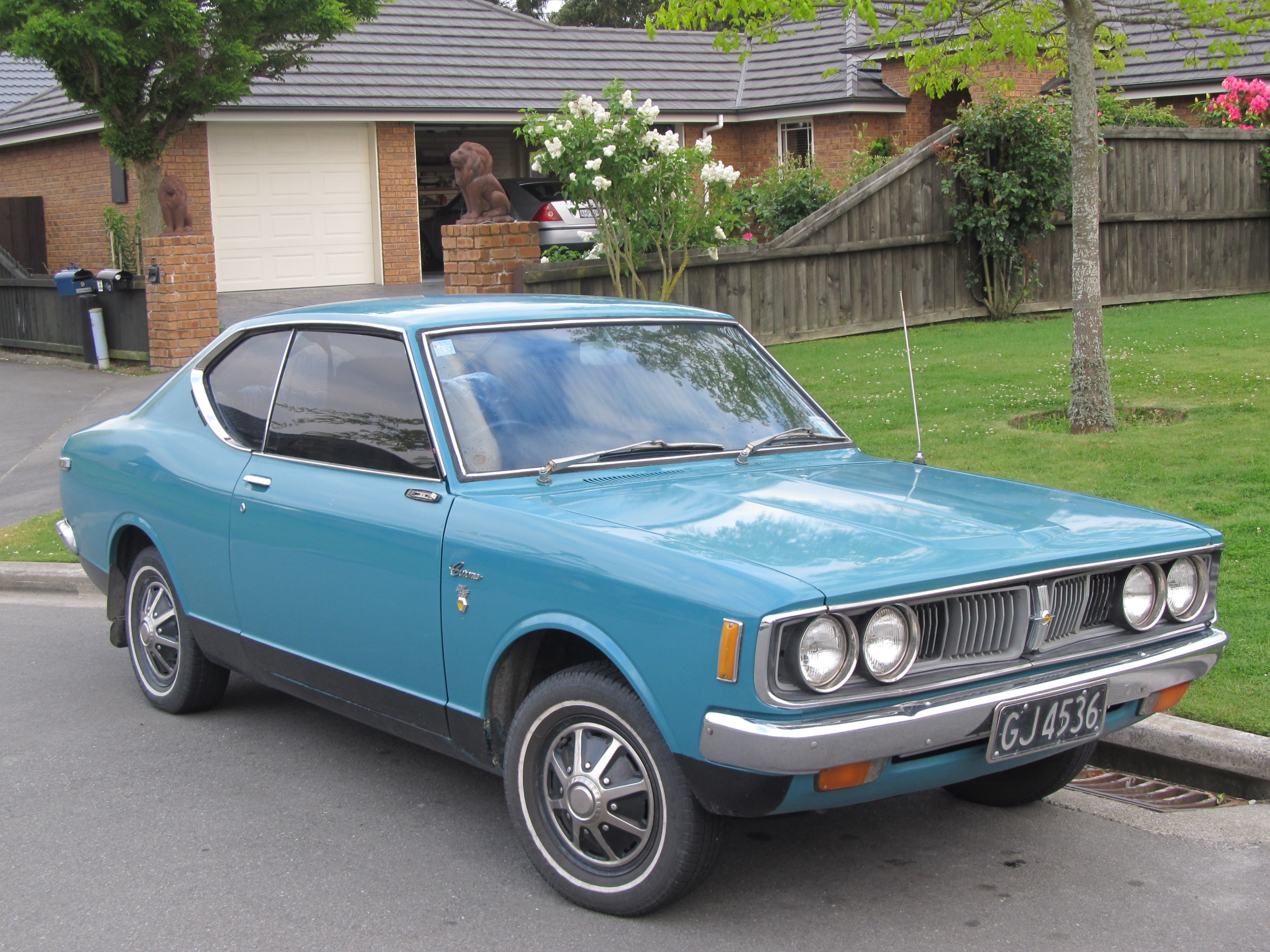
1972 Toyota Corona Coupe 1700 (New Zealand)

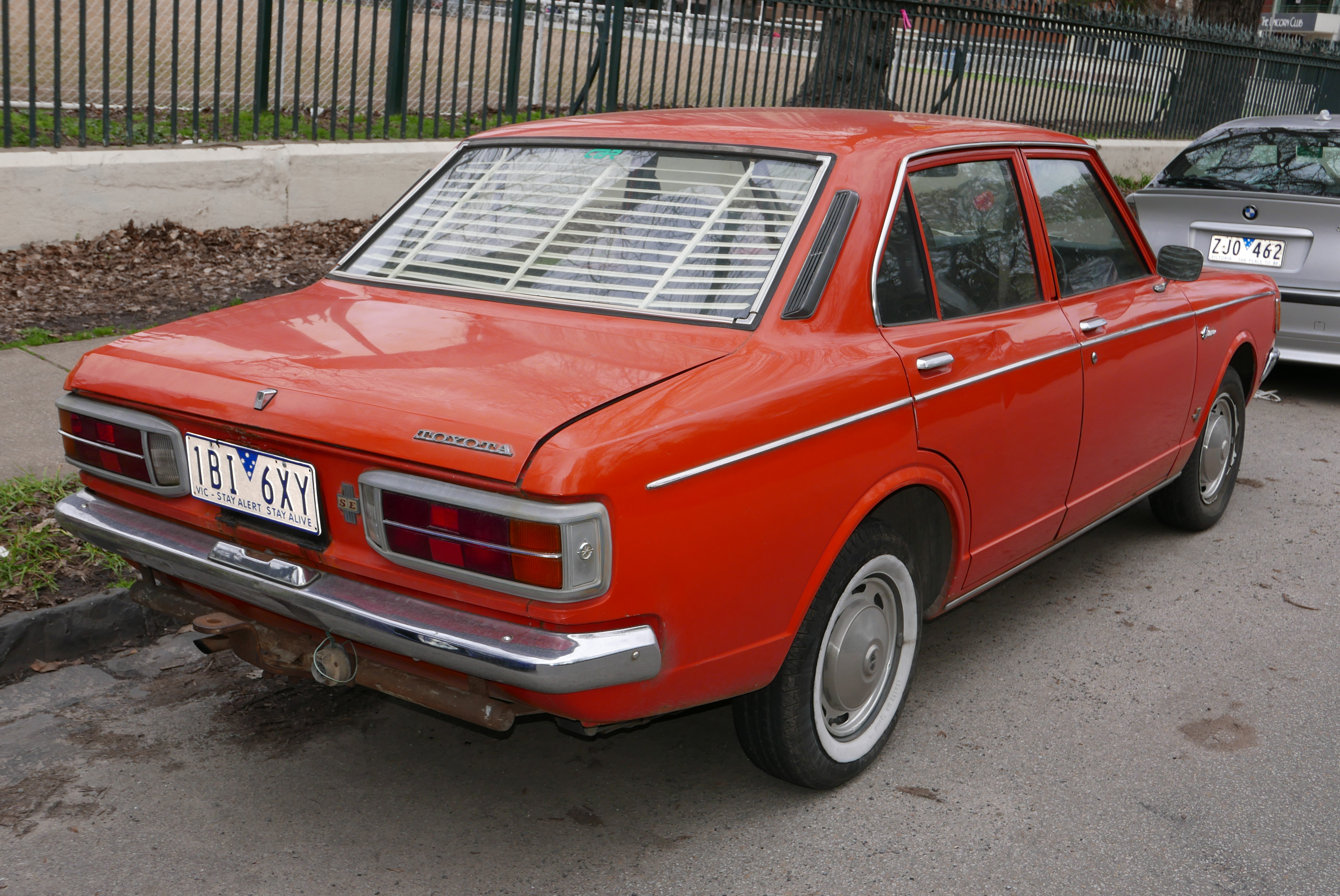
Toyota Corona SE sedan (RT81, Australia)

== Fifth generation (T100, T110, T120; 1973) ==
Fifth generation
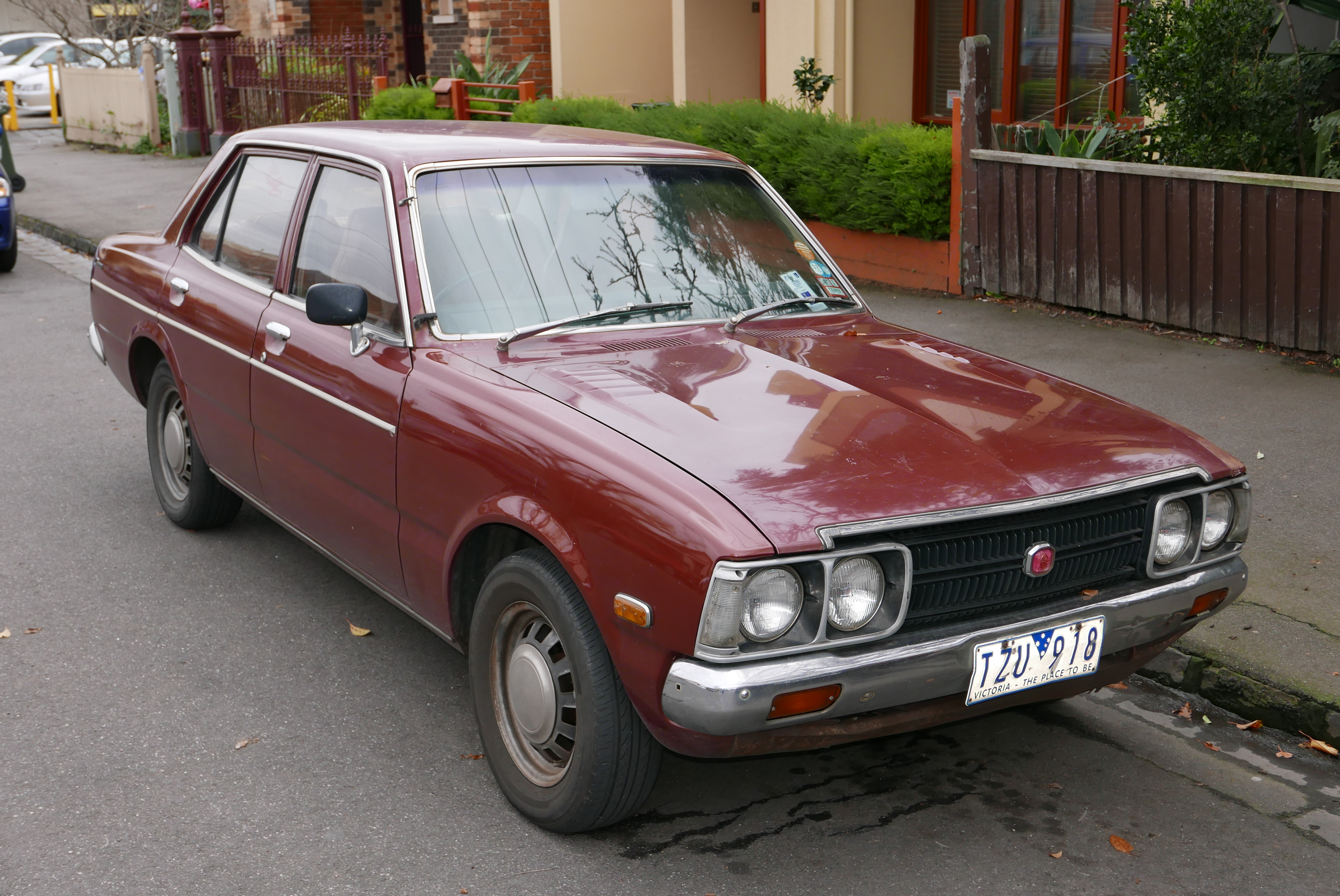
- 1975 Toyota Corona SE sedan

Overview
- Model code: T100; T110; T120
- Also called: Toyota 2000 (UK)
- Production: August 1973 — May 1979
- Assembly: Japan: Toyota, Aichi (Tsutsumi plant); Australia: Port Melbourne, Victoria (AMI); New Zealand: Christchurch (Steel Motor Assemblies, under contract to Consolidiated Motor Distributors); Indonesia: North Jakarta (PT. Multi Astra); Philippines: Parañaque (Delta Motors Corporation); South Africa: Durban

Body and chassis
- Body style: 2-door sedan; 4-door sedan; 2-door hardtop coupé; 5-door station wagon
- Layout: Front-engine, rear-wheel-drive

Powertrain
- Engine: 1.6 L 2T I4 (TT100/106V/110/120); 1.6 L 12T I4 (TT125); 1.6 L 12R I4(RT100/106V/110/116); 1.8 L 3T-U I4 (TT121); 1.8 L 13T I4 (TT126); 1.8 L 16R I4 (RT102/108V/112/117); 2.0 L 18R I4 (RT104/114/118/122); 2.0 L 19R I4 (RT103/111); 2.2 L 20R I4 (RT105/115/119)
- Transmission: 3-speed manual; 4-speed W40 manual; 5-speed W50 manual; 3-speed A40 automatic

Dimensions
- Wheelbase: 2,500 mm (98.4 in)
- Length: 4,250 mm (167.3 in) (sedan); 4,481 mm (176.4 in) (wagon)
- Width: 1,610 mm (63.4 in) (sedan); 1,610 mm (63.4 in) (wagon)
- Height: 1,390 mm (54.7 in) (sedan); 1,430 mm (56.3 in) (wagon)
- Curb weight: 1,090 kg (2,403 lb) (sedan); 1,256 kg (2,770 lb) (wagon)

31 August 1973 saw the introduction of the Corona T100-Series, which continued to be built as a two-door or four-door sedans, a two-door hardtop coupé (T110 chassis codes) and as a four-door station wagon (marketed as a van for commercial use in Japan). Chassis codes 100–105 were reserved for sedans, with 106–109 for vans, the 110–115 was for the hardtop coupé while 116–119 was for the wagon versions. The 120-series model codes were used for late-series facelifted models in the Japanese market fitted with the new emissions control TTC-C motors. The two-speed automatic was no longer offered. The facelift revised the bonnet and grille and enlarged the tail lights. The station wagon featured optional wood panel body claddings. Engines were 1.6, 1.8 and 2.0-litre SOHC units. In North America, the 20R 2.2-litre engine was used.

The high-performance 2000GT Sedan and Hardtop Coupé with 18R-G twin cam engine were only offered in Japan. Yamaha supplied the alloy head for these high performance normally aspirated engines fitted with twin Mikuni-Solex 40 mm side-draft carburettors and a compression ratio of 9.7:1. Gearbox was the Porsche-type synchromesh 5-speed P51 coupled to a 4.1 F series limited-slip differential, giving a claimed top speed of 200 km/h (125 mph). In 1972, a new set of performance coupes is introduced on the Corolla platform called the Corolla Levin and Sprinter Trueno.

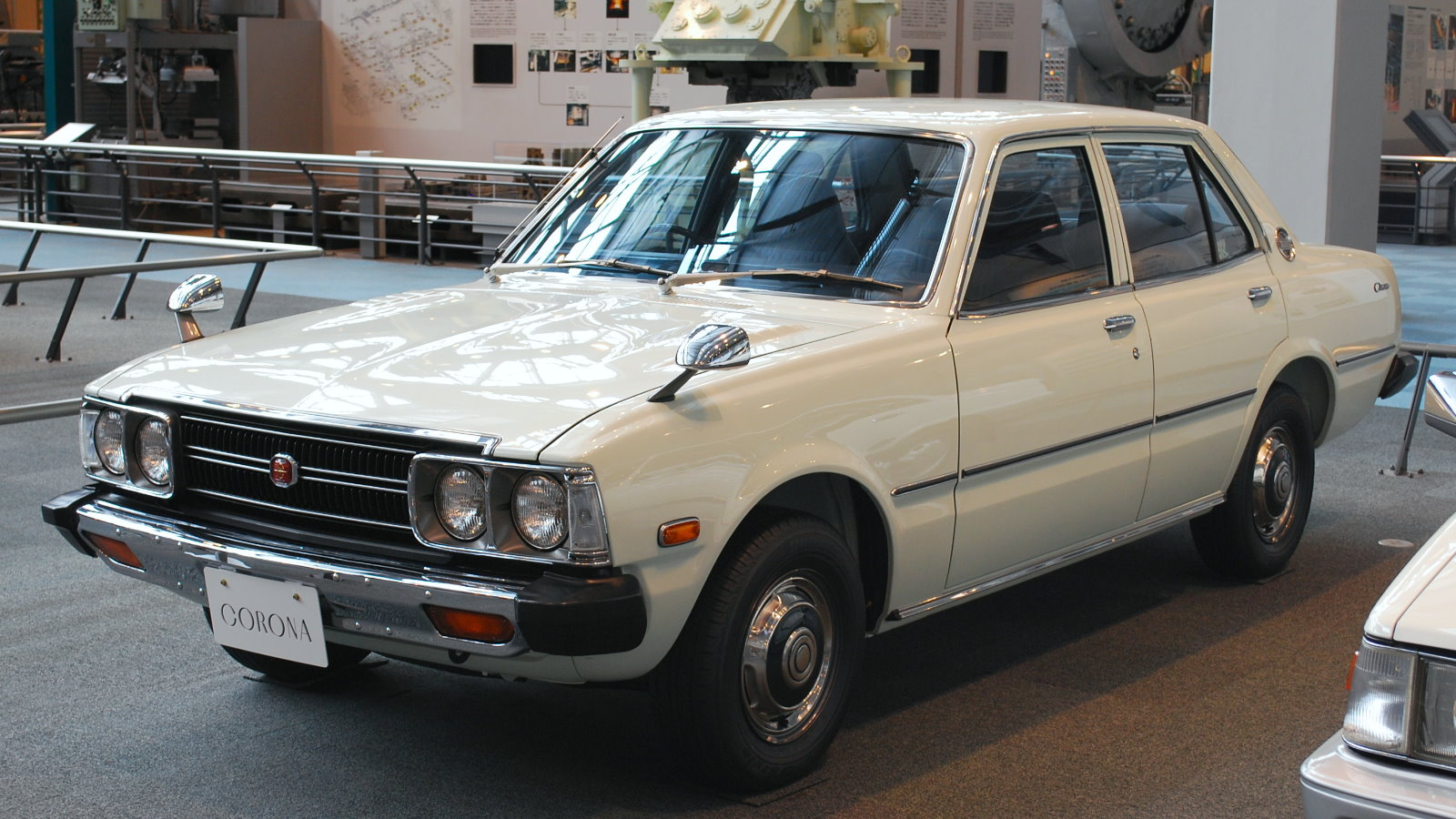
1976 Corona sedan (RT102, Japan)

North American models had longer bumpers (hiding recoverable bumper shocks) to meet local 5 mph (8.0 km/h) impact standards; they gained standard radial tires in 1975. Side door impact upgrades were installed in all doors. This series also saw the standard (on some models) Electro Sensor Panel which monitored fluid and bulb status. As with earlier Coronas, some models had a shifter mounted on the steering column. Sales of the Corona continued to grow as a result of the 1973 oil crisis. The two-door hardtop continued, with trim levels 1600GL, 1800SR and the 2000SR, with the coupé proving popular in the US but more popular yet in Japan. The two-door sedan, meanwhile, sold well in the United States but very little in Japan, and this was the last Corona to be offered in this bodystyle.

The Corona saw new competitors in both Japan, Europe and the United States from the Honda Accord in 1976, and the Subaru DL in 1974. The advantage the Honda and Subaru had over the Corona was that both vehicles were front-wheel-drive, while the Corona was rear-wheel-drive. In response to the Japanese Governments passage of emission control regulations, Toyota introduced the Toyota TTC-V (Vortex) on the 80 PS (59 kW) 19R engine only, using an Exhaust gas recirculation implementation. In Japan, the 12R-U engine was designed to run on LPG for taxi usage, starting in October 1975. To meet new emissions regulations the 1.6-litre 12R engine was replaced by the more modern 2T-J in commercial models. The 18R-E engine with fuel injection that was used in the 2000SL and 2000SR discontinued production due to emission issues. In November 1975, the 1800 saw the removal of the twin carburetors due to emission regulations, which meant the discontinuation of the 1800SR coupé. June 1976 saw the installation of a catalyst system included with the TTC-C system.

January 1977 saw a minor appearance change to both the interior and exterior, with a revised grille and bonnet, new headlight surrounds and a restyled dashboard. The taillights were also modified; while still rectangular, they were less busy in appearance.

New Zealand assembly began with 1.6 OHV, three-speed manual column shift and bench front seat and 1.8-litre 16R OHC four-speed manual bucket front seat options. Later, the 18R 2.0-litre OHC engine replaced the 1.8 and was also offered with a three-speed automatic, the first auto Corona in New Zealand. A later update replaced the 2000 with an upgraded trim version badged 2000SE and wagon assembly commenced.

Australian models had the 18R from the start, as did South African ones.

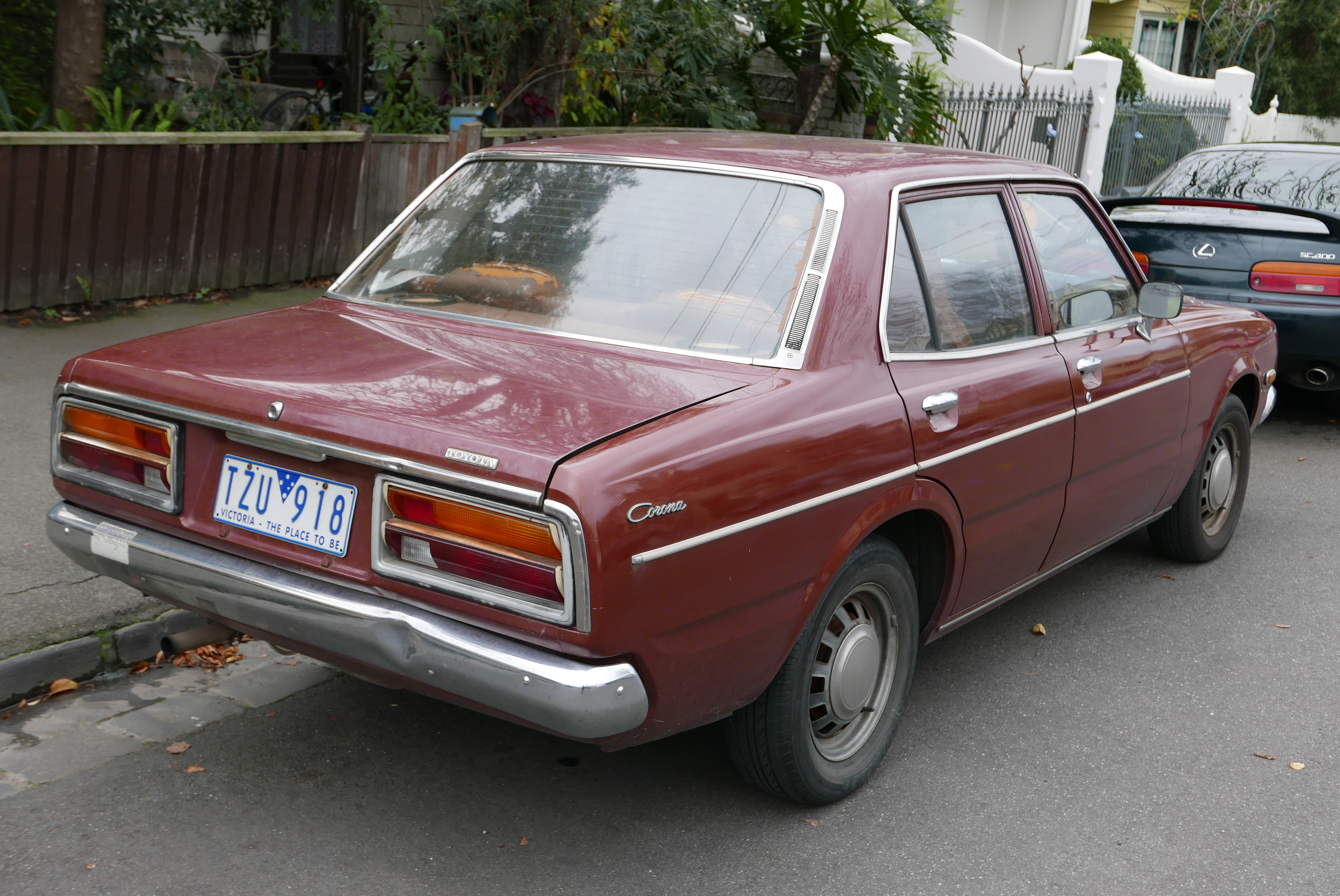
1974–1977 Corona SE sedan (RT104, Australia)

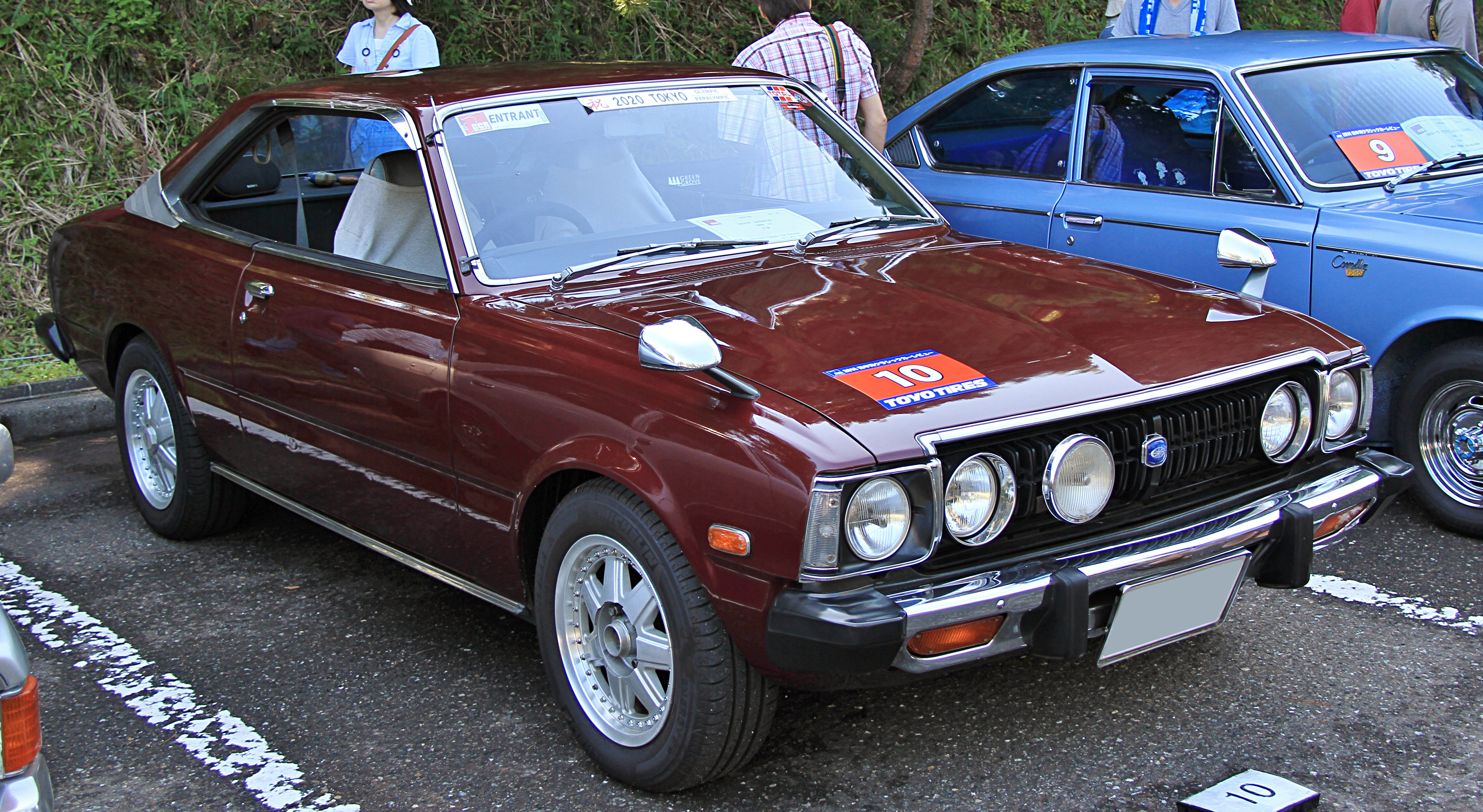
1975 Toyota Corona 2000GT

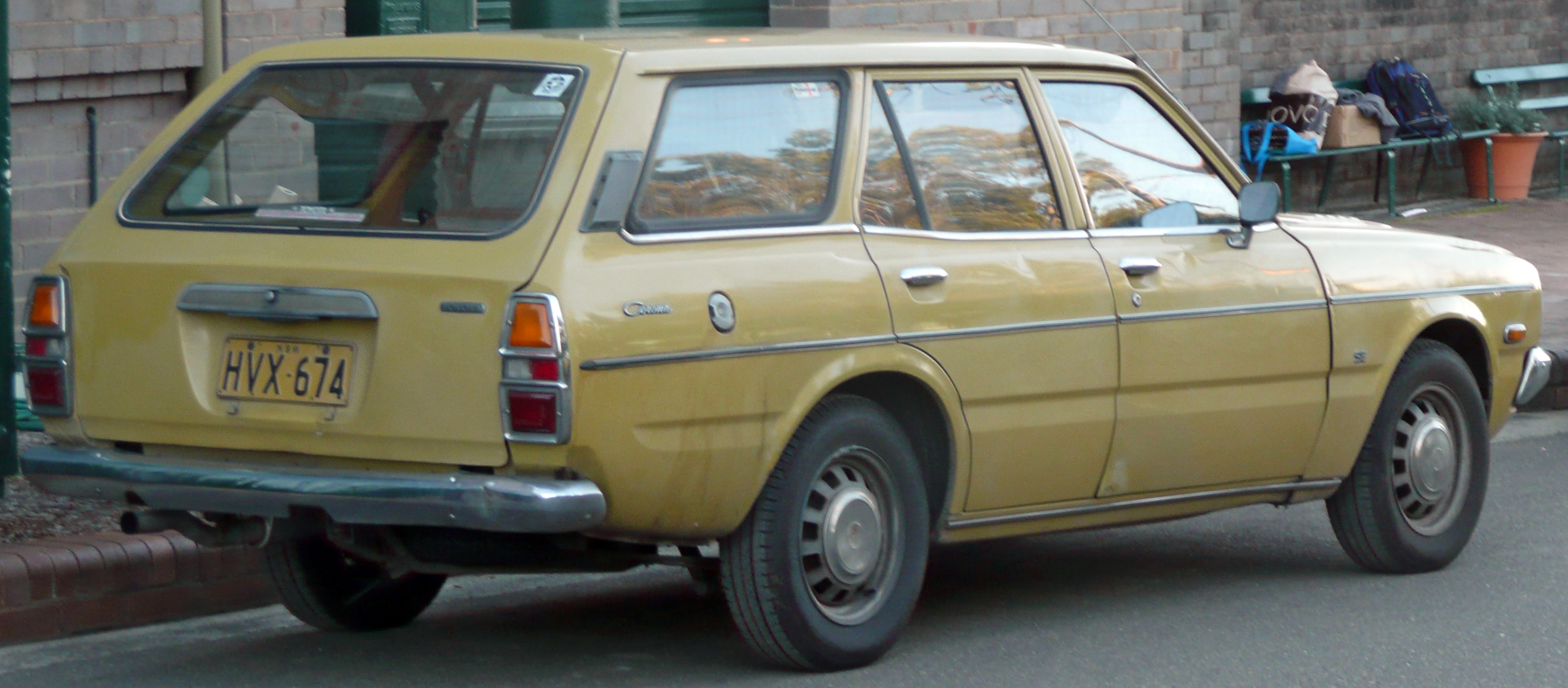
1974–1977 Corona SE station wagon (RT118, Australia)

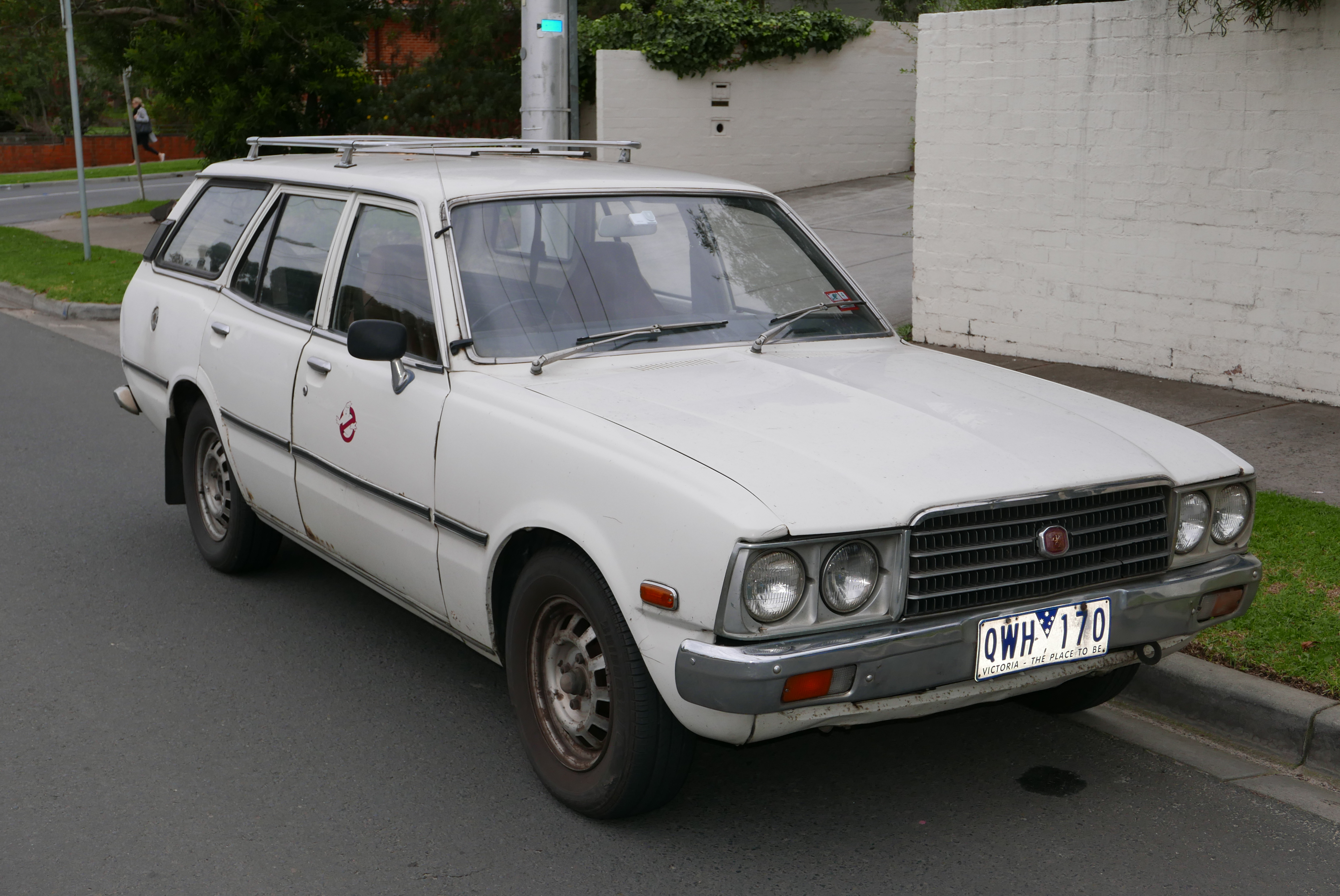
1977–1979 Corona CS station wagon (RT118, Australia)

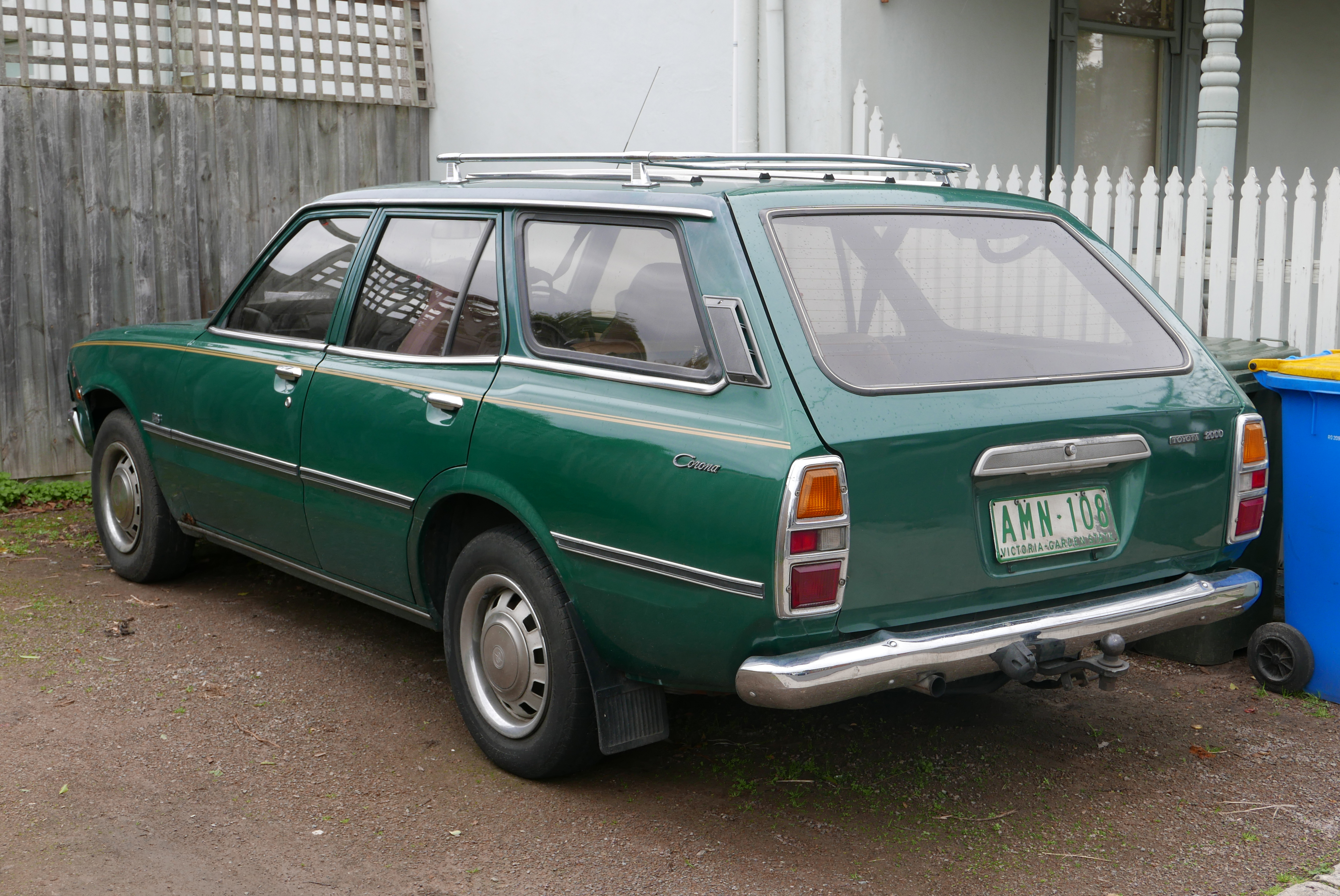
1977–1979 Corona CS station wagon (RT118, Australia)

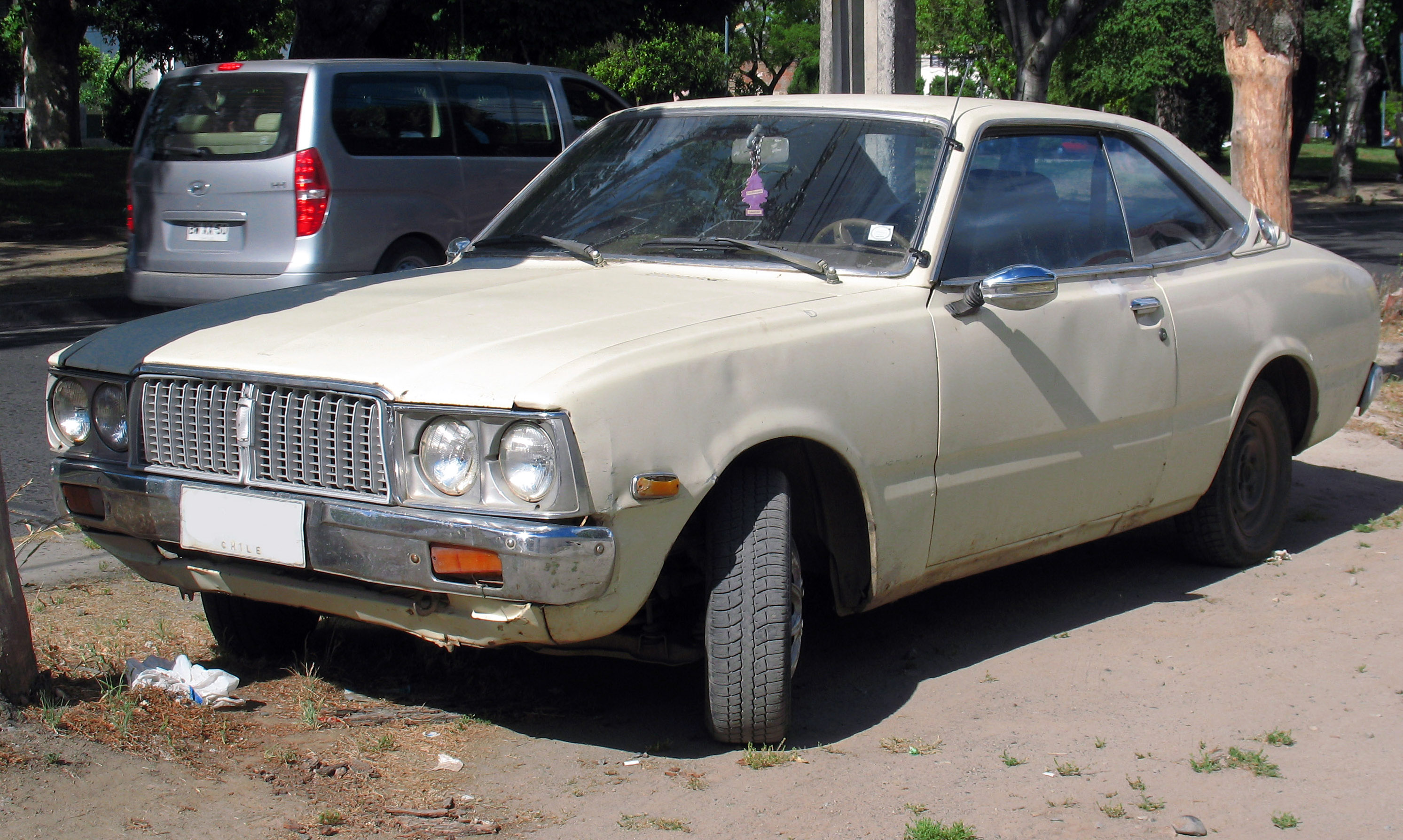
1977–1979 Corona coupé (TT121)

== Sixth generation (T130; 1978) ==
Sixth generation
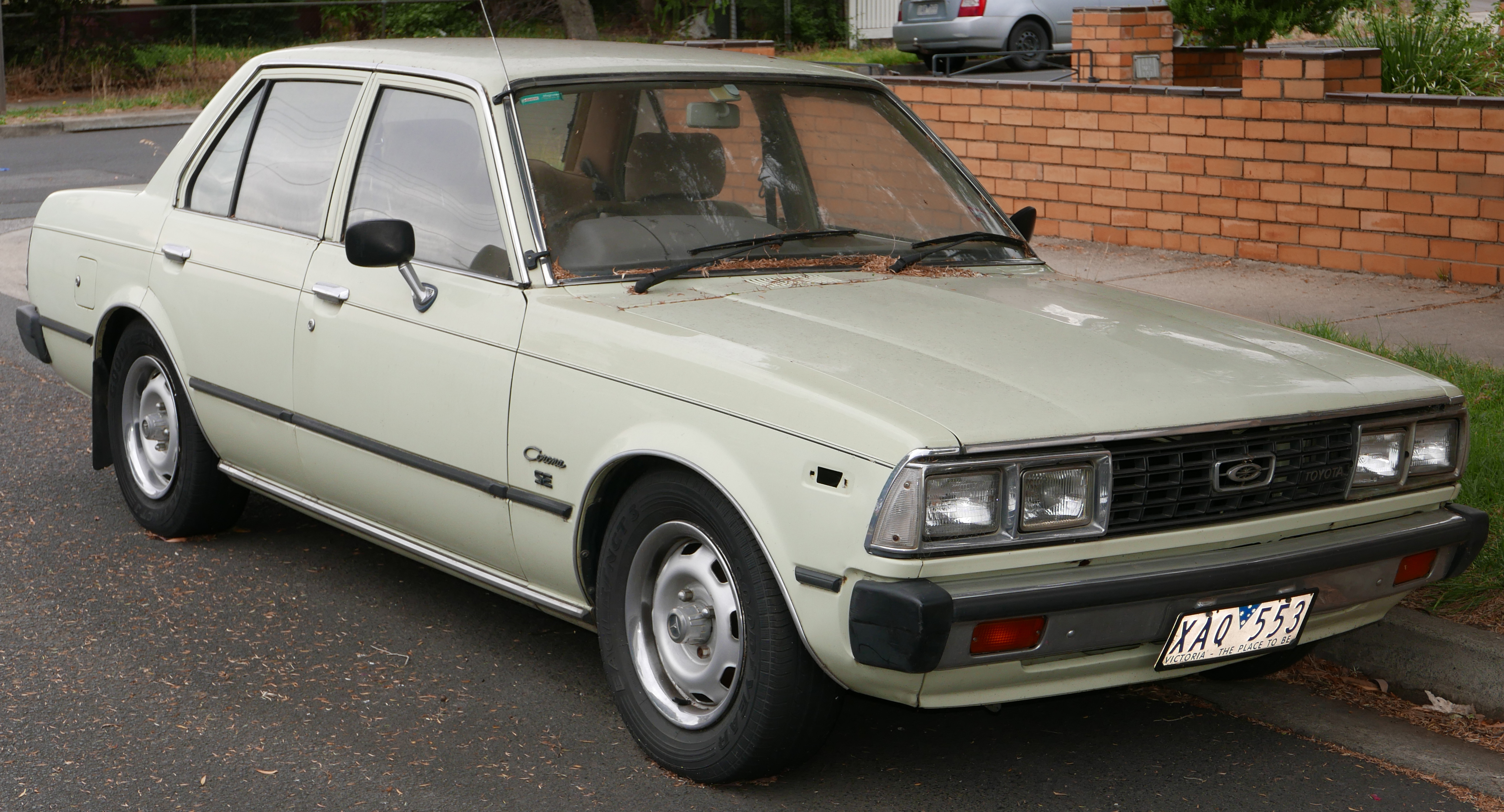
- Toyota Corona SE (XT130) sedan (Australia, pre-facelift)

Overview
- Model code: T130
- Production: September 1978 – April 1983; September 1979 – 1983 (Australia)
- Assembly: Japan: Toyota, Aichi (Tsutsumi plant); Australia: Port Melbourne, Victoria (AMI); New Zealand: Christchurch; Indonesia: North Jakarta (PT. Multi Astra); Philippines: Parañaque (Delta Motors Corporation)

Body and chassis
- Body style: 4-door sedan; 2-door hardtop coupé; 5-door liftback; 5-door station wagon
- Layout: Front-engine, rear-wheel-drive

Powertrain
- Engine: 1.6 L 12R/12R-M/U/LPG I4 (RT130); 1.6 L 2T-J I4 (TT137V); 1.6 L 12T-U I4 (TT130/138V); 1.8 L 3T/3T-EU I4 (TT132); 1.8 L 13T-U I4 (TT131); 1.8 L 16R-J I4 (RT137V); 1.9 L Holden 1X I4 (XT130); 2.0 L 5R-U/LPG OHV I4 (RT131); 2.0 L 18R/18R-C I4 (RT132); 2.0 L 18R-GEU DOHC I4 (RT132); 2.0 L 21R-C/U I4 (RT133); 2.2 L 20R I4 (RT134); 2.4 L 22R I4 (RT135)
- Transmission: 3-speed manual; 4-speed manual T40; 5-speed manual W50/55/Borg-Warner 505; 3-speed A40 automatic; 4-speed A40D automatic

Dimensions
- Wheelbase: 2,525 mm (99.4 in)
- Length: 4,260–4,290 mm (167.7–168.9 in); 4,330–4,360 mm (170–172 in) (wagon/van); 4,440–4,445 mm (175–175 in) (SL/GT models)
- Width: 1,645–1,655 mm (64.8–65.2 in)
- Height: 1,370–1,380 mm (53.9–54.3 in) (coupe/liftback); 1,400–1,405 mm (55.1–55.3 in) (sedan); 1,425 mm (56.1 in) (wagon/van)
- Curb weight: 970–1,130 kg (2,140–2,490 lb)

Introduced in Japan in September 1978, the T130 series Corona adopted a boxier design over the outgoing T100/110/120 series. It maintained the standard front-engine / rear-wheel-drive layout of all Coronas that preceded it. The T130 series was available in a wide range of body styles across various markets including a four-door sedan, two-door hardtop coupe, four-door wagon and new five-door liftback, which featured a 40:60 split fold rear seat. The assignment of "T130" to all Corona body styles signified a new approach from having different series number identifiers for the various body styles. This was also the first Corona to be sold as a "Toyota" rather than a "Toyopet" in the Japanese domestic market.

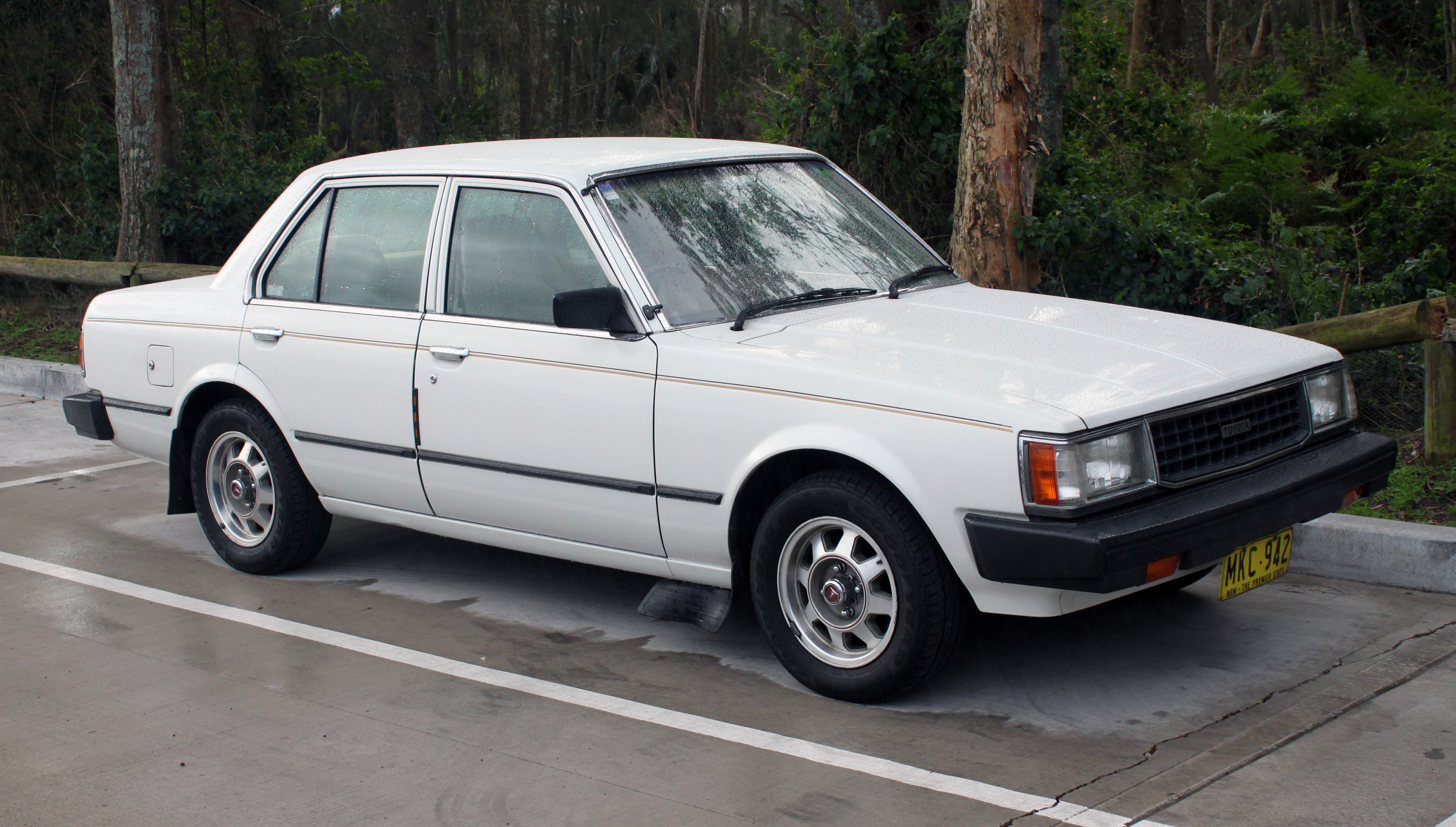

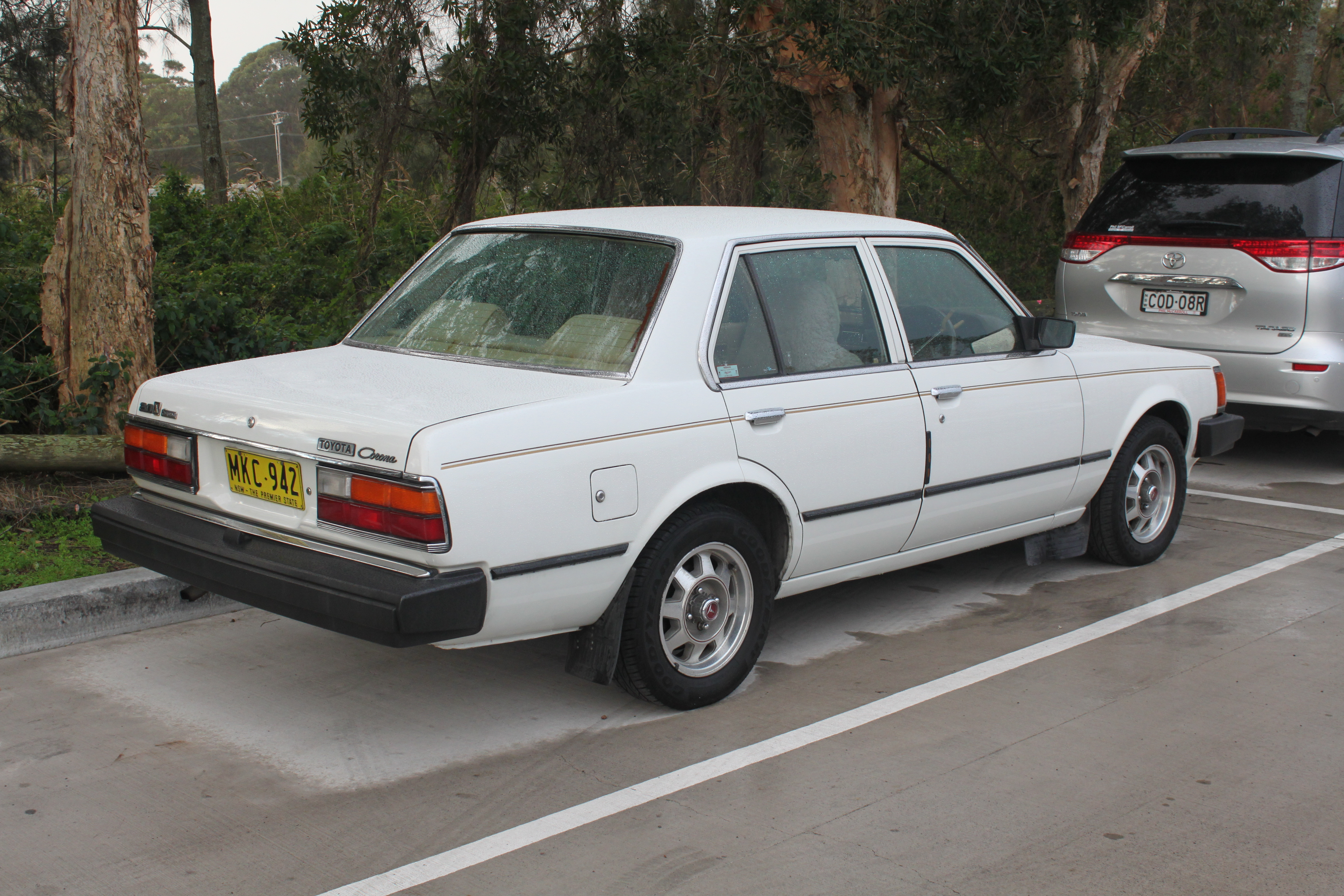
Corona XX sedan (Australia; facelift)

All models featured MacPherson strut independent front suspension as well as a four-link trailing arm rear suspension arrangement with a Panhard rod, except for the wagon, which used leaf springs, like the Corolla and Cressida wagons. Disc brakes were fitted as standard equipment on the front of all models. Rear disc brakes were fitted as standard on the 2000GT and 2000SL, which were not available to all international markets. Other models were fitted with rear drum brakes.

The Corona range received a thorough facelift in August 1980, with new rearwards sloping rectangular headlights which gave it a more modern appearance at the front.

The T130 series was manufactured with a wide range of engine and transmission combinations. 1.6-litre 12R, 2T (and associated 12T) and 2.0-litre 18R engines are the most common. The LPG-powered 12R engine became available in the Japanese domestic market in February 1979 and, along with the LPG-powered 5R engined model, continued to be built until August 1982. The rest of the Corona range was taken out of production for the Japanese market in December 1981. Amongst other minor changes, the 1.8-litre 3T / 13T engine was added in 1981 to replace the 1.6-litre 2T/12T. The North American Corona shared the 2.2-litre 20R engine with the Celica. Emission regulations passed in 1978 were applied across the range of models offered. The 1.8L engine was equipped with electronic fuel injection as well as the 2.0L engine. In Japan the venerable 2.0L 18R-G was offered in the range-topping 2000GT, developing 101 kW (135 hp) at 5800 rpm.

The station wagon was, as usual at the time, marketed as a "light van" in Japan. This was registered as a commercial vehicle for certain tax benefits and less restrictive emissions standards. When introduced, the Corona Van was available as a 1600 (TT137V) or an 1800 (RT137V), both using engines not installed in the rest of the range. The 2T-J in the 1600 Standard produces 93 PS (68 kW) at 6000 rpm while the DX and GL models' 1.8-litre 16R offered 95 PS (70 kW) at 5600 rpm but with considerably more torque. The 2T and 16R were both replaced by the newer 12T-J engine in December 1979, reflecting newly tightened emissions standards for commercial vehicles in Japan. This model, the TT138V, produces 86 PS (63 kW) at 5600 rpm.

Production of the T130 ended in 1982, to be replaced by the T140 series.

=== Markets ===
United States

The T130 was the last Corona to be marketed in the US. It was offered as a sedan, wagon, or liftback with either Base or LE (Luxury Edition) equipment. In North America, the Corona was replaced for the 1983 model year by the similarly sized but front-wheel-drive Camry sedan and five-door hatchback. Since then, the Camry has grown a size larger than the Corona and its sportier Carina sister car. The Corona was originally fitted with the 2.2-litre 20R engine, but along with a facelift for 1981 this was switched to the 2367 cc 22R with 96 hp (72 kW; 97 PS) at 4800 rpm. The facelift version received a rearward-sloping front end and a modestly restyled rear; North American cars received quad rectangular headlamps and a standard five-speed manual or an optional four-speed automatic.

Australia

To meet an 85 per cent overall local parts content as a manufacturer, Toyota Australia chose to manufacture Corona sedans and wagons using 1.9-litre Holden Starfire engines. As installed by Toyota, the engine received some minor changes in the form of its own camshaft, manifold, and carburettor. In Toyota engine terminology it received 1X badging and was coupled with a four-speed or optional five-speed Borg-Warner 505. A three-speed automatic was also available. Period commenters universally criticized the antiquated Holden powerplant as rough, lacking power, and excessively thirsty. There was also a very well-equipped Corona XX, recognizable by its alloy wheels (shared with the Supra). In spite of its air of sports and luxury, the Corona XX received the 58 kW (79 PS; 78 hp) Starfire engine, albeit here only with a five-speed manual.

Beginning in November 1979, Toyota Australia also imported the five-door Corona liftback fitted with Toyota's own, much more modern 2.0-litre 18R-C engine with 63 kW (86 PS; 84 hp). In 1981 the Australian Corona received the same facelift as seen elsewhere, with a new rearward sloping front. Toyota's engineers also further modified the Holden engine in an effort to increase drivability and reliability, with new gaskets, valves, valve springs, and water pump. Outputs remained the same but the performance did increase marginally thanks to better engine response. The facelifted Corona XX now benefitted from an imported engine, the same 2-litre 21R-C as used in the Celica.

New Zealand

New Zealand assembly started with the 1.6-litre 12R engine and three-speed manual transmission with bench front seat, and 1.8-litre 3T (TT132) with a four-speed manual or three-speed automatic. The 1.6-litre was soon changed to the newer 2T engine, coupled with a four-speed manual and bucket front seats. Later in the run, Toyota NZ added a locally assembled Liftback version with the 1.8-litre engine and manual or automatic transmission. These models also had a standard radio and separate cassette deck—both were rare factory fittings in the country at the time.

1982

- 1600 Standard, DX, GL, SL
  - 4dr sedan, 2dr hardtop, 4dr liftback coupé (Standard only as sedan)
  - 88 hp (12T-U)
  - rigid rear axle
  - 4-speed gearbox (SL 5-speed)
  - brakes: front disc, rear drum
- 1800 DX, GL, CX, LX, SL
  - 4dr sedan, 2dr hardtop, 4dr liftback coupé
  - 95 hp (13T-U)
  - rigid rear axle
  - 5-speed gearbox
  - brakes: front disc, rear drum
- 1800 EFI SL, EFI SX
  - 4dr sedan, 2dr hardtop, 4dr liftback coupé
  - 105 hp (3T-EU)
  - rigid rear axle with anti-roll bar
  - 5-speed gearbox
  - brakes: front disc, rear disc
- 2000 CX
  - 4dr sedan, 2dr hardtop, 4dr liftback coupé
  - 105 hp (21R-U)
  - rigid rear axle with anti-roll bar
  - 5-speed gearbox
  - brakes: front disc, rear disc
- 2000 GT II, GT
  - 4dr sedan, 2dr hardtop, 4dr liftback coupé
  - 135 hp (18R-GEU)
  - rigid rear axle with anti-roll bar
  - 5-speed gearbox
  - brakes: front disc, rear disc

Indonesia

In Indonesia, the locally built T130 Corona was available as a 2000 (RT132) from 1979. From 1981 it became available as an 1800 (TT132). It was then replaced by the X60-series Toyota Corona Mark II. The Corona returned to Indonesia with the T150-series Corona FF.

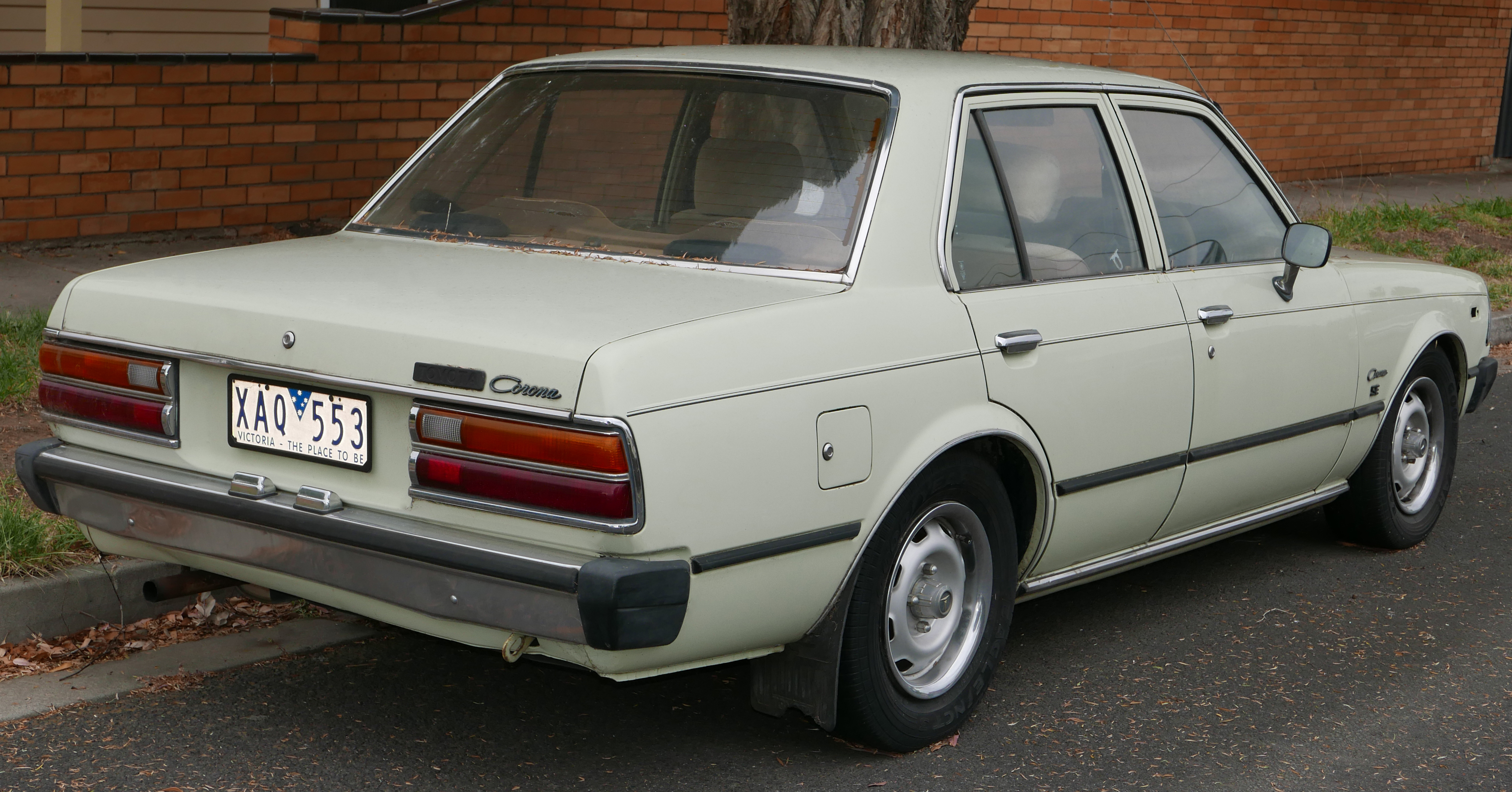
Toyota Corona (XT130) CS sedan (Australia, pre-facelift)

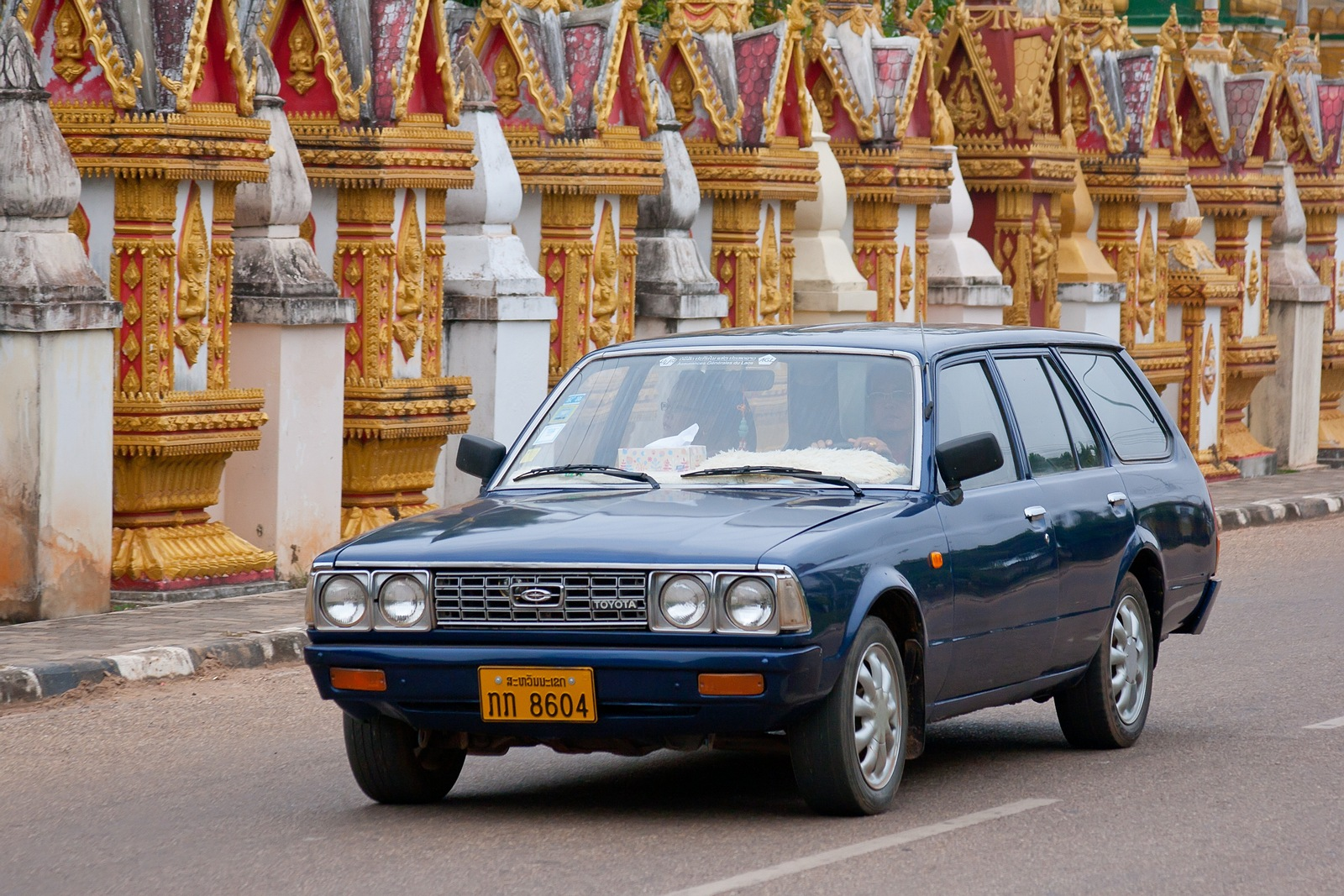
Toyota Corona van (Laos)

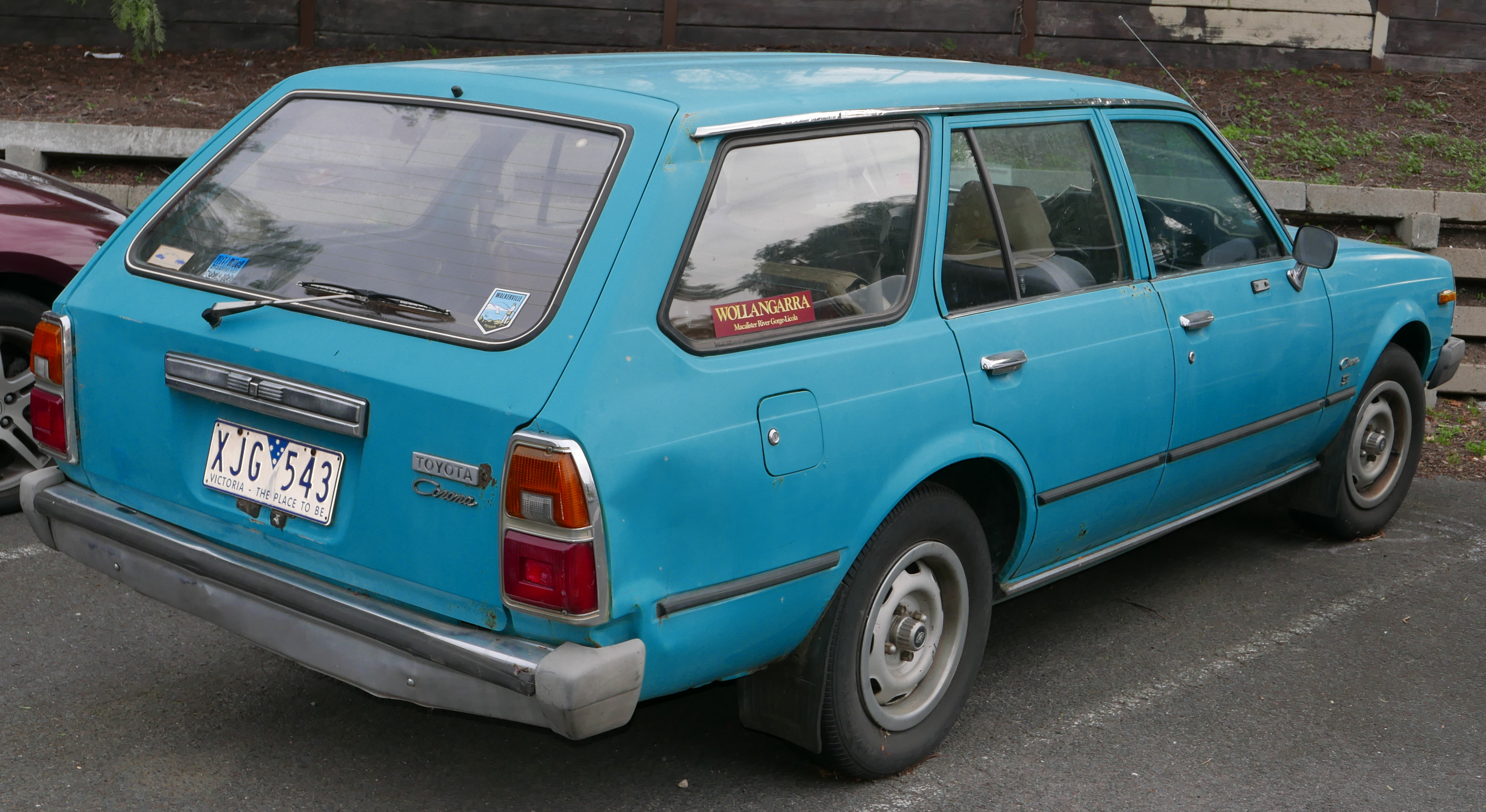
Toyota Corona (XT130) SE wagon (Australia, pre-facelift)

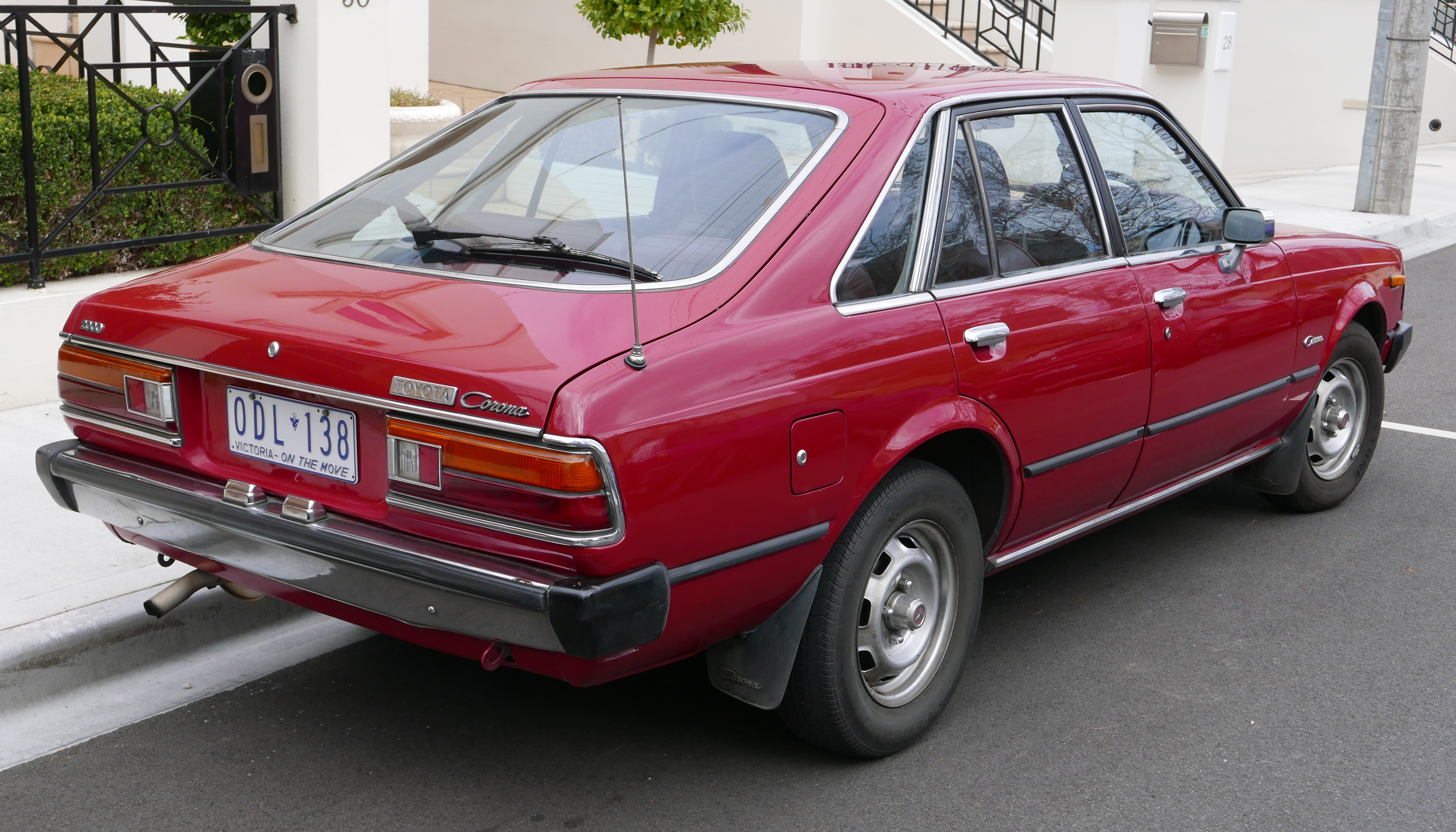
Toyota Corona (RT132) liftback (Australia, pre-facelift)

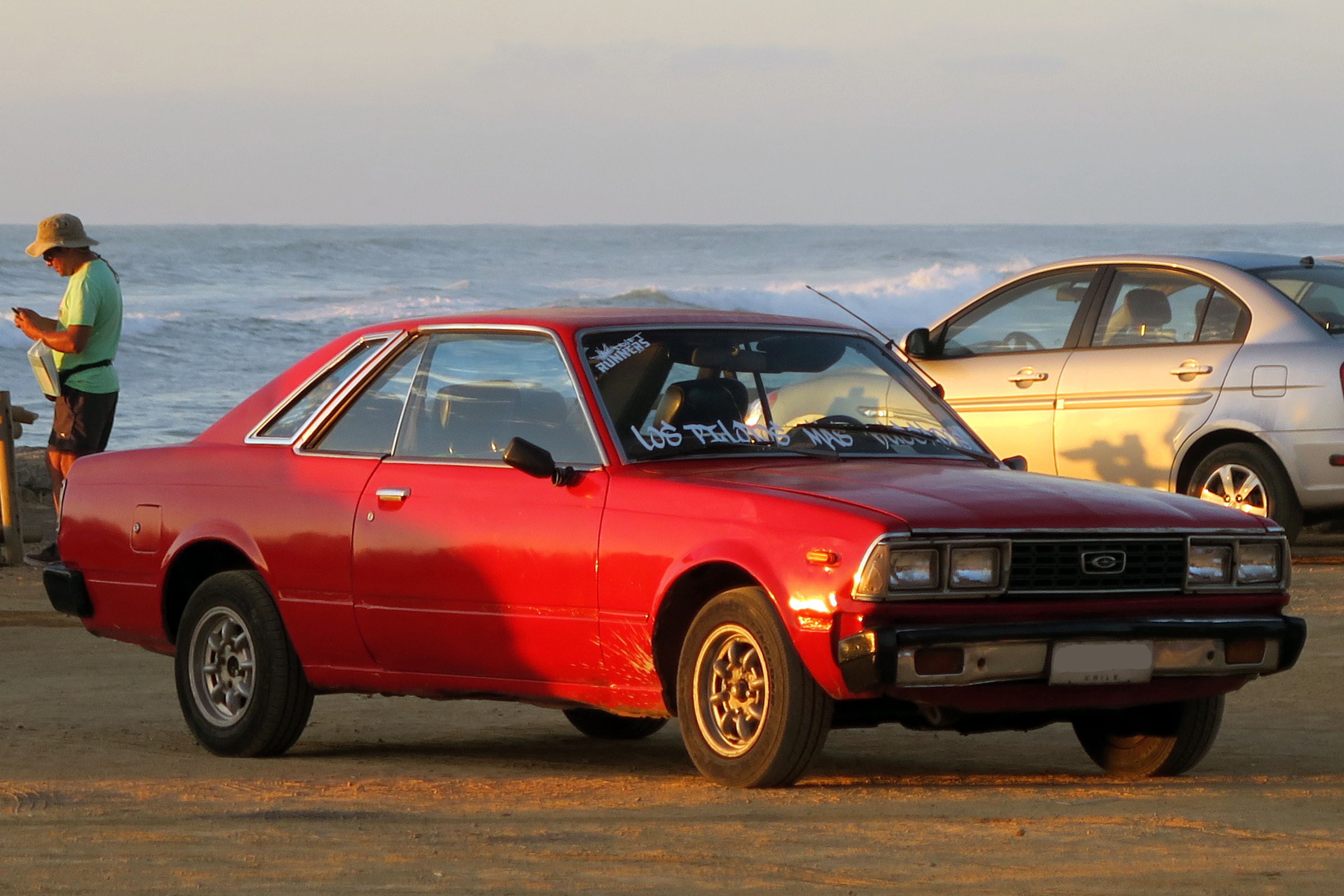
Toyota Corona DX (TT131) coupe (Chile, pre-facelift)

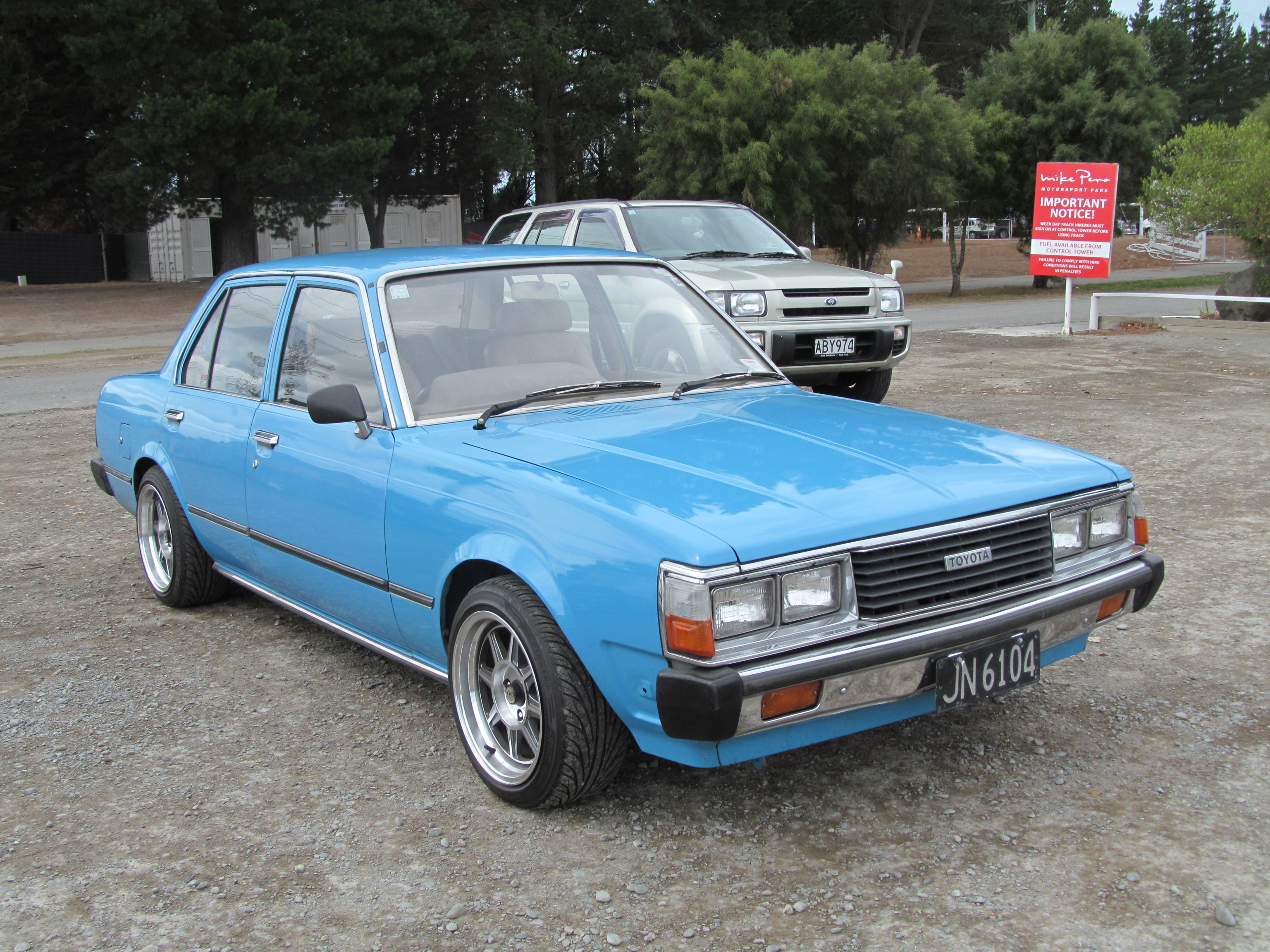
Toyota Corona sedan (New Zealand, facelift)

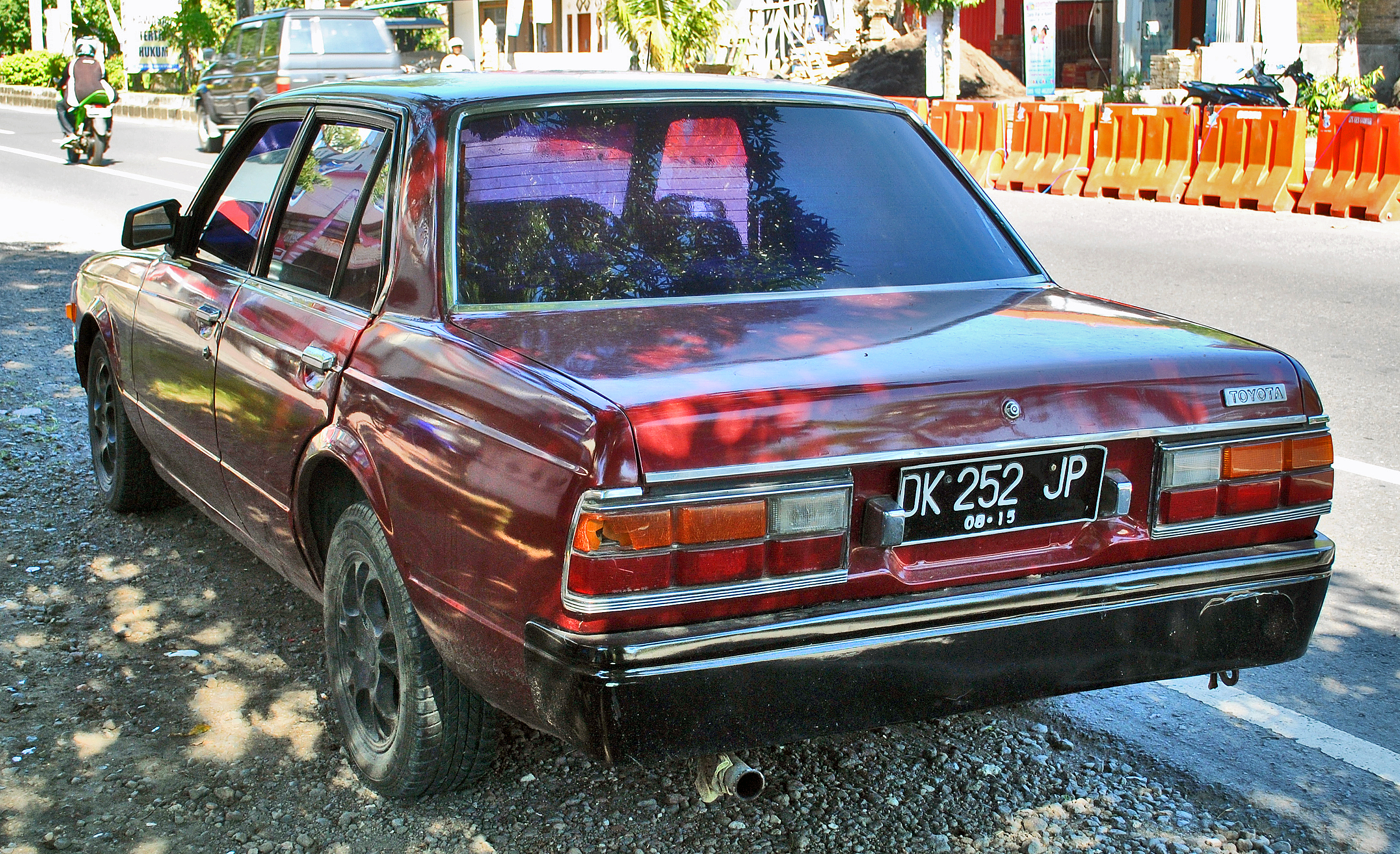
Toyota Corona Deluxe (TT132) sedan (Indonesia, facelift)

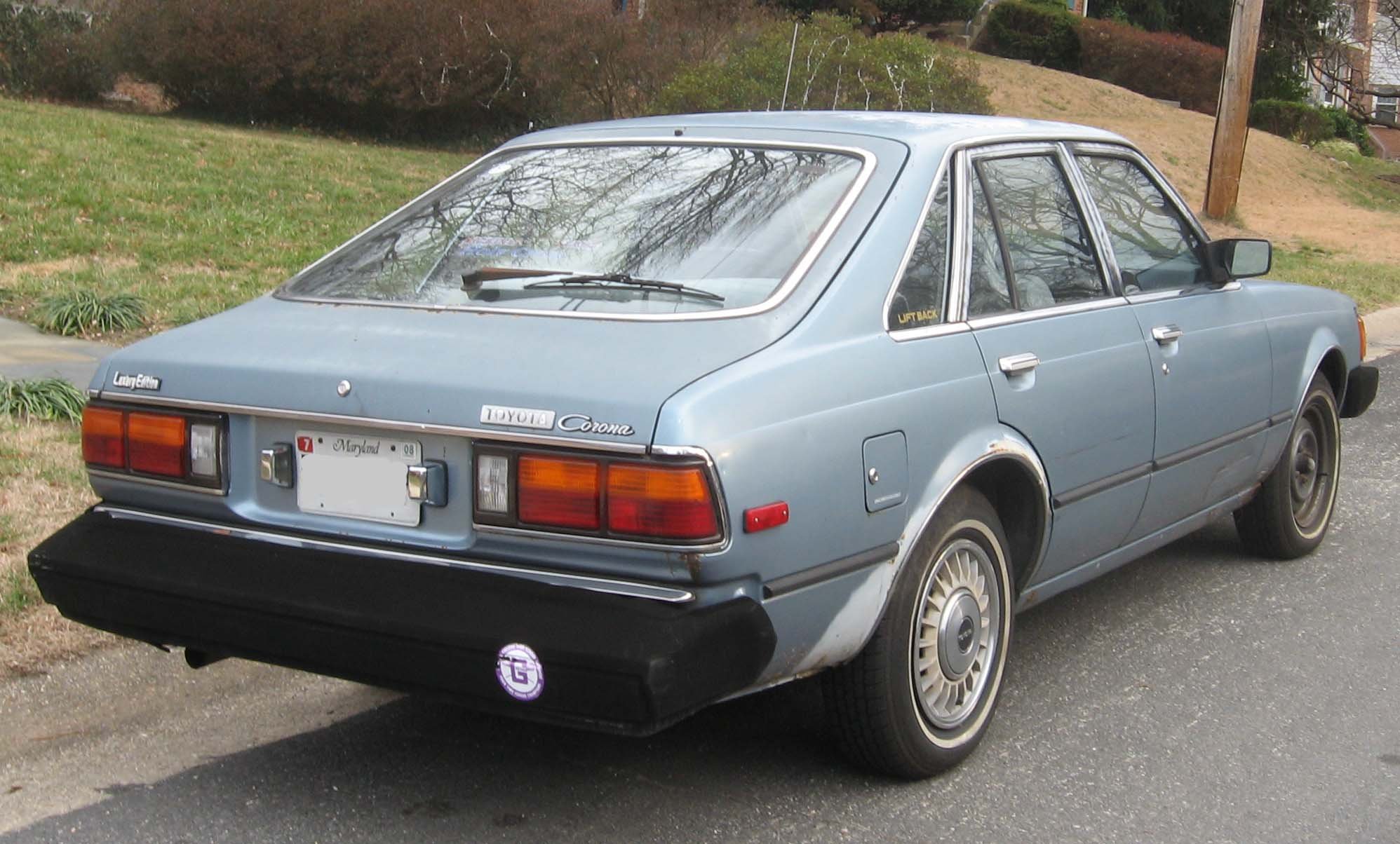
Toyota Corona LE (RT135) liftback (United States, facelift)

== Seventh generation ==
Starting with this generation series, the Toyota Carina platform was altered from its original Toyota Celica beginnings to the Corona platform. The Corona remained exclusive to Japanese dealerships Toyopet Store, and the Carina continued to be sold new only at Toyota Store locations in conjunction to the larger Toyota Crown. Cumulative production of the Corona reached six million units in November 1986.

=== Rear-wheel-drive model (T140; 1982) ===
Seventh generation Rear-wheel-drive model
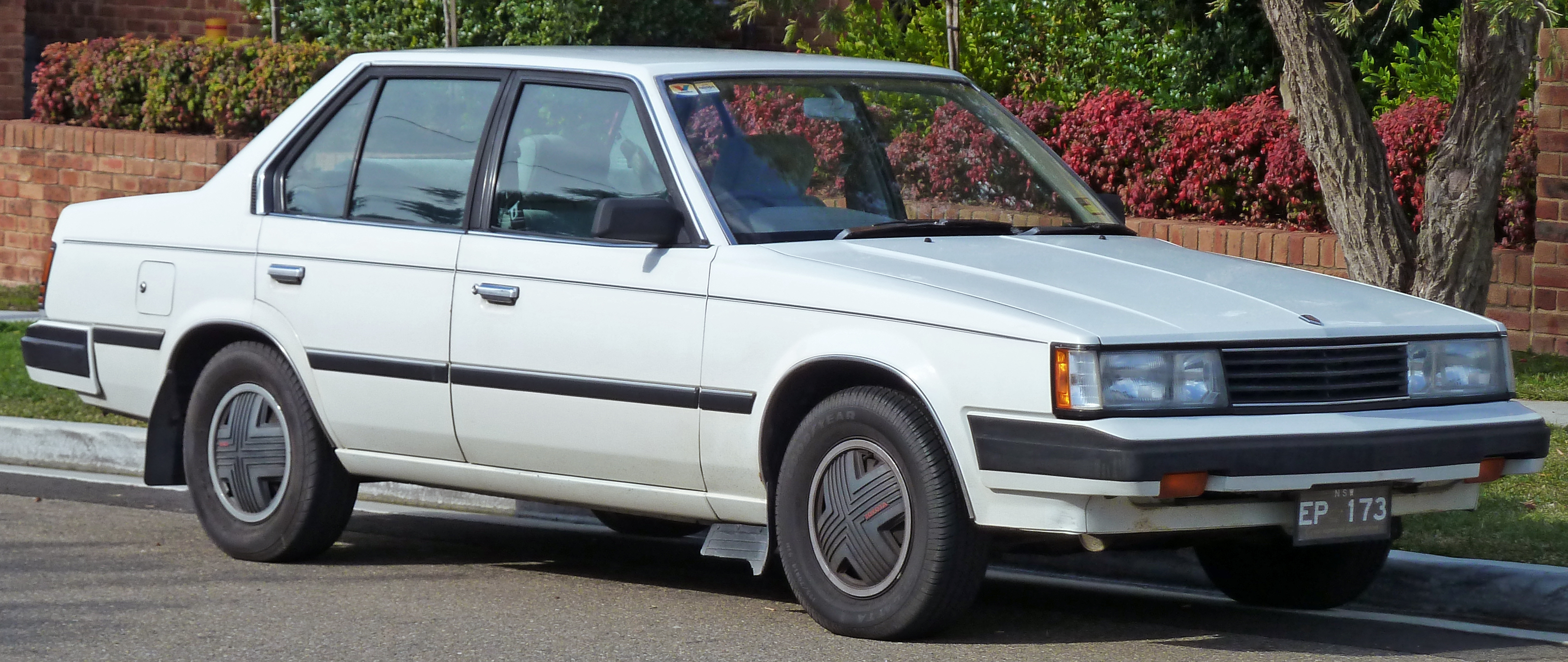
- Pre-facelift Toyota Corona CS-X sedan (ST141, Australia)

Overview
- Model code: T140
- Production: January 1982 – December 1987; January 1982 – April 1998 (Taxi); 1983 – February 1987 (Australia)
- Assembly: Japan: Toyota, Aichi (Tsutsumi plant); Australia: Port Melbourne, Victoria (AMI); New Zealand: Thames; Philippines: Parañaque (Delta Motors Corporation)

Body and chassis
- Body style: 2-door hardtop coupe; 4-door sedan; 5-door wagon/van
- Layout: Front-engine, rear-wheel-drive
- Related: Toyota Celica; Toyota Carina

Powertrain
- Engine: Petrol: 1.5 L 5K-J I4 (KT147V); 1.5 L 3A-U I4 (AT140); 1.6 L 4A-GEU I4 (AT141); 1.6 L 2T I4 (TT140, export); 1.6 L 12T-J I4 (TT147V); 1.8 L 3T-EU I4 (TT141/142); 1.8 L 3T-GTEU I4 turbo (TT142); 1.8 L 1S-U I4 (ST140); 2.0 L 2S-C I4 (ST141); 2.0 L 18R-GEU I4 (RT141); 2.4 L 22R-E (RT142); LPG: 1.8 L 2Y-P/PU I4 (YT140, taxi); Diesel: 1.8 L 1C I4 (CT140/147V); 2.0 L 2C-II I4 (CT141)
- Transmission: 4-speed manual; 5-speed manual; 3-speed automatic; 4-speed automatic

Dimensions
- Wheelbase: 2,500 mm (98.4 in)
- Length: 4,495–4,570 mm (177.0–179.9 in)
- Width: 1,660 mm (65.4 in)
- Height: 1,315–1,415 mm (51.8–55.7 in)
- Curb weight: 965–1,165 kg (2,127–2,568 lb)

The T140, which would become the longest running Corona series, entered production as a rear-wheel-drive sedan, coupé and wagon in January 1982. Manufacture by Toyota Australia continued until 1987, by which time the T150 series had already been released. The T140 series was also brought out in a diesel/LPG powered, high-roofed taxicab version which was particularly popular in Hong Kong, Macau, and Singapore. The T140 was not exported to many markets where the T130 had been sold (such as Indonesia), with many importers choosing to hold out for the front-wheel-drive T150.

For the Japanese market only, the five-door wagon (called "Van") was available with a 1.5-litre 5K-J petrol engine, a 1.6-litre 12T-J petrol engine or a 1.8-litre 1C diesel engine. The petrol engines had either a 4-speed manual or a 3-speed automatic gearbox but the diesel engine had a 5-speed manual gearbox. Some wagons had five doors but no rear seat.

European export versions received the 2T four-cylinder, with 75 PS DIN (55 kW). There was also an 86 PS (63 kW) 1.8-litre engine, as well as the 1.8-litre 1C diesel unit, with a claimed 58 PS DIN (43 kW). The T140 Corona was not exported in large numbers to Europe, as most importers focused on the slightly smaller Carina and then the front-wheel-drive T150-series cars.

After the late 1985 introduction of the T160 Corona Coupé, the rear-wheel-drive coupé was discontinued. The sedan range was gradually whittled down and by May 1986 only the 1.5 and 1.8 (3A-U, 1S-U) remained, along with a 1.5 Van (KT147V) and a 1.8 Diesel Van. These continued to be available until the December 1987 introduction of the T170-series Corona.

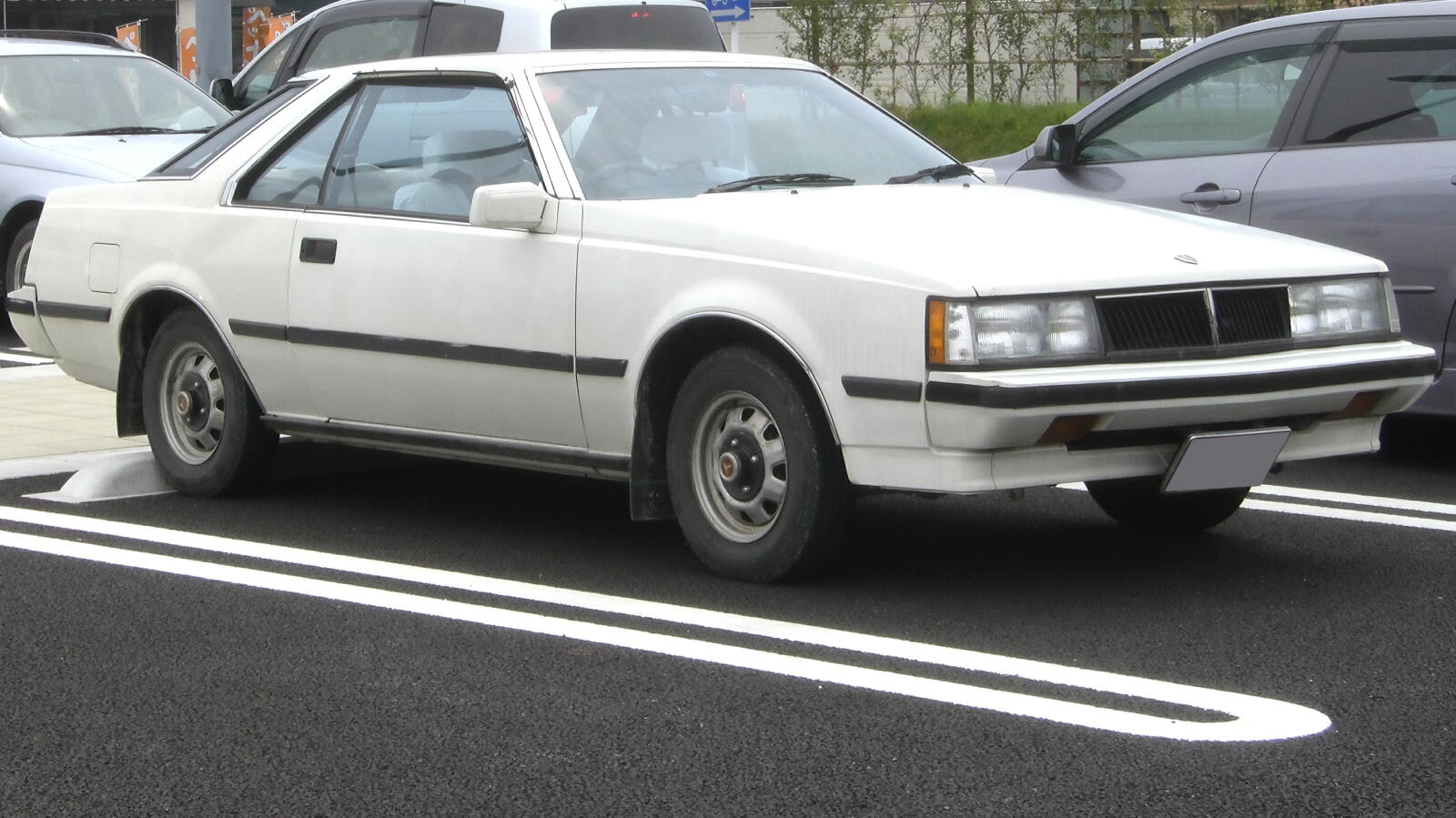
1983 Corona Coupé (Japan)

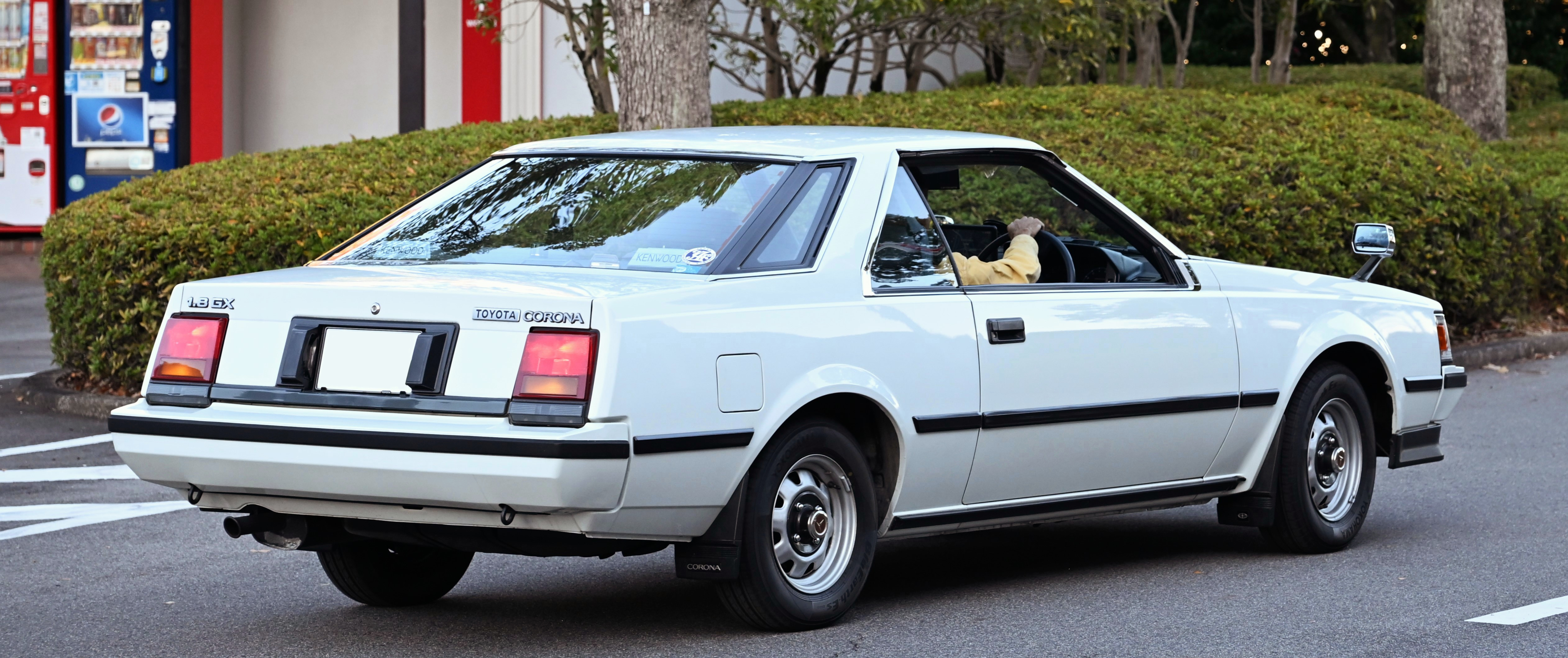
Rear view (Corona Coupé)

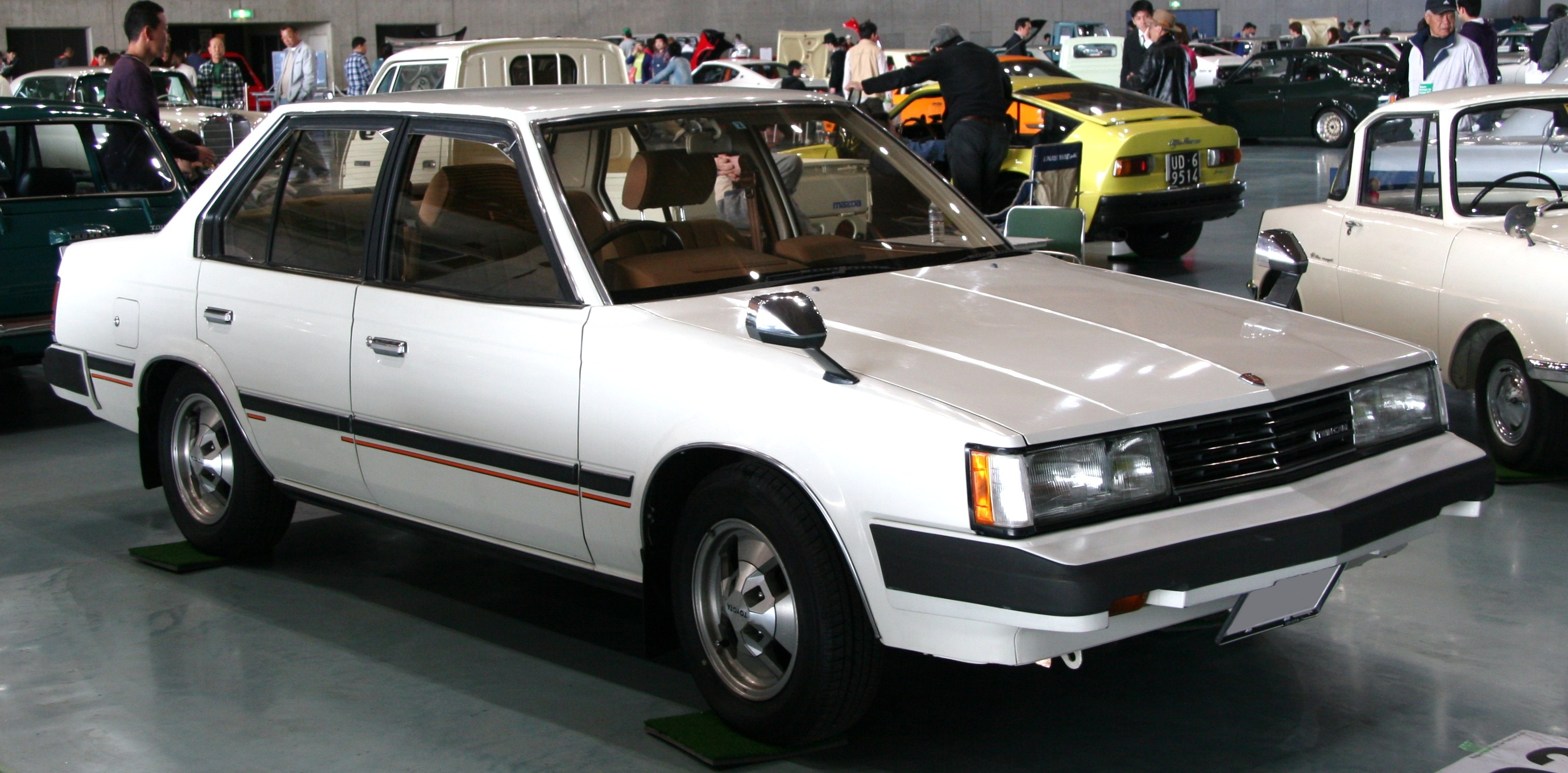
Toyota Corona 2000 GT Twin Cam (RT140, Japan)

Australia

For the Australian market, there were two models sold between 1983 and 1987: the ST141 with a 2.0-litre 2S-C and from 1984, the RT142, fitted with a 2.4-litre fuel-injected 22R-E. Both models were available in either sedan or wagon body styles. The lower S and CS trim levels (2.0-litre) were fitted standard with a four-speed manual transmission (optional five-speed manual and three- or four-speed automatic). The top trim level was the 2.0-litre CS-X until November 1984 when replaced by the 2.4-litre CSi and luxury Avante models (2.0- and 2.4-litre).

Toyota released a limited edition Olympic model in 1984, offering a full digital instrument cluster in either manual or automatic and in both sedan and wagon body variants. In 1985, a limited edition SR model was offered in white and manual transmission only with front and rear spoilers, white painted grille and side mirrors, white highlights in the tail lamps (instead of black), SR lettering on the boot lid, red exterior pinstriping, sports front seats with red pin stripes, and a three-spoke leather steering wheel.

Toyota Australia introduced a facelift in November 1985. This included the addition the former CS-X grille insert for the S model and the Avante grille for the CS and CSi. There were also new wheels trims on all versions and revised tail lamp lenses. The pre-facelift models can be identified by tail lamps with dual black horizontal lines engraved along the base. The facelift models received lenses with a single, more subtle, horizontal line intersecting across the centre of the tail lights and a chrome strip at the base. Facelift CS and CSi wagons received a horizontal strip across the tailgate and additional black plastic mouldings surrounding the license plate.

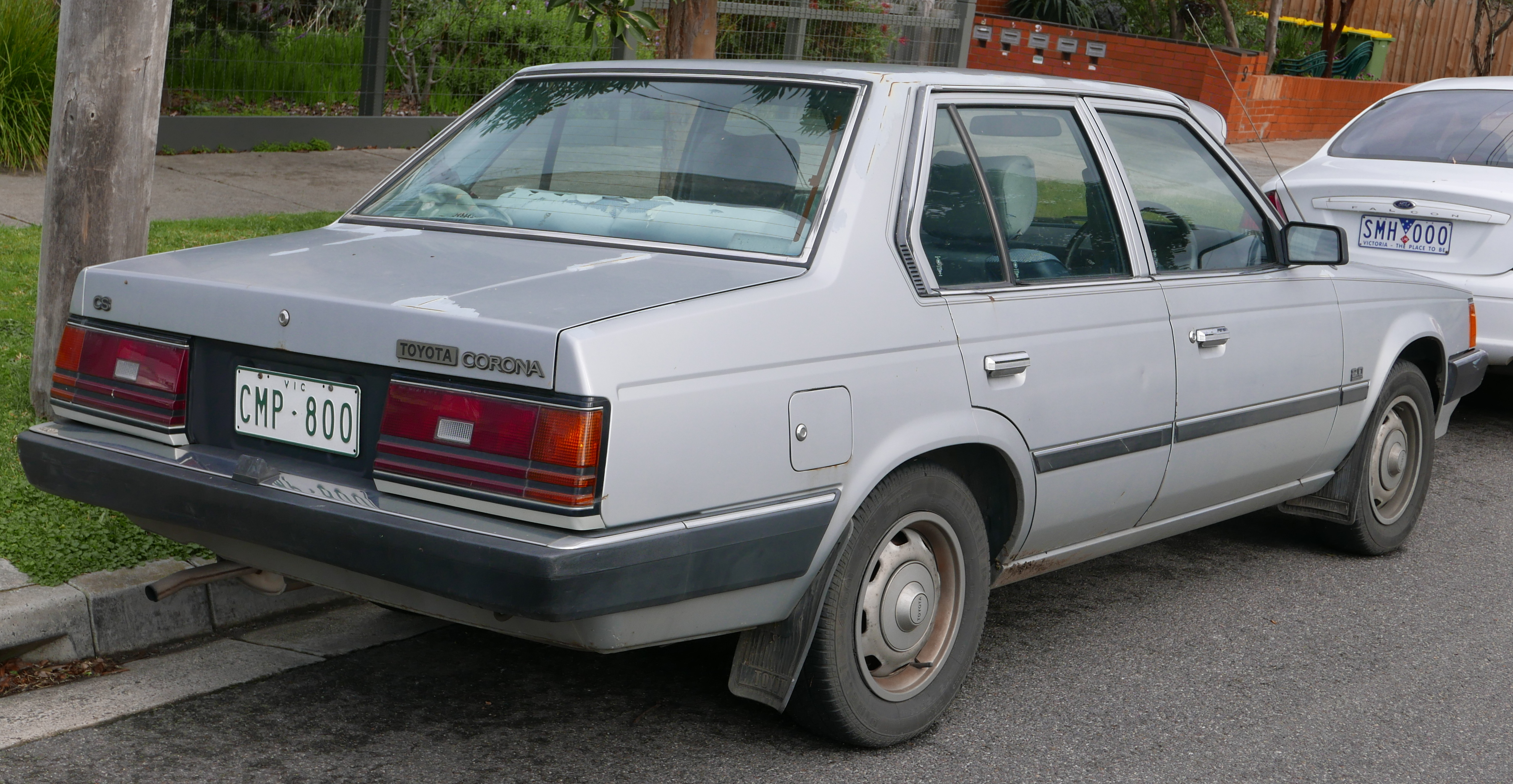
Pre-facelift Toyota Corona CS sedan (ST141, Australia)

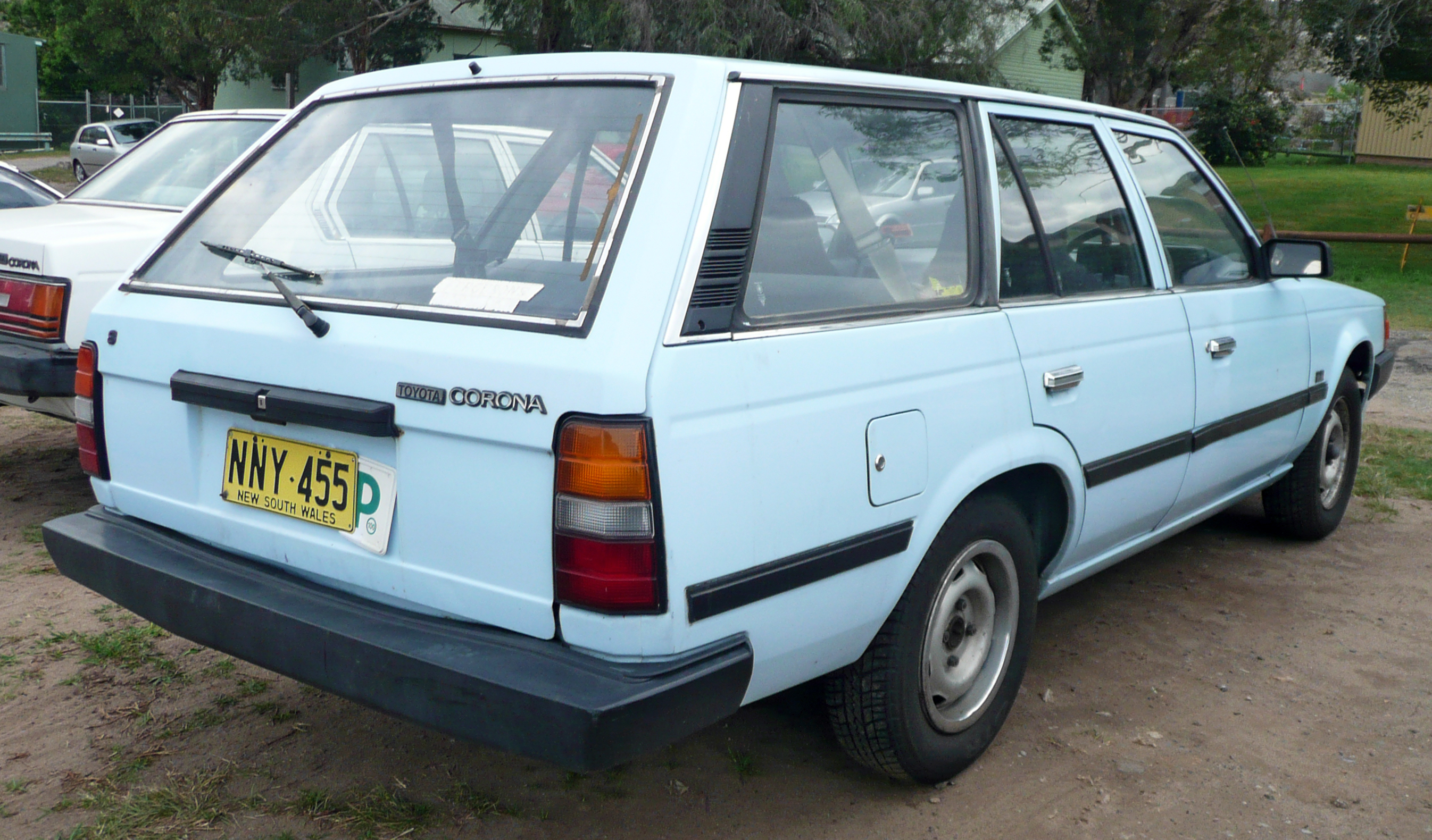
Pre-facelift Toyota Corona S wagon (ST141, Australia)

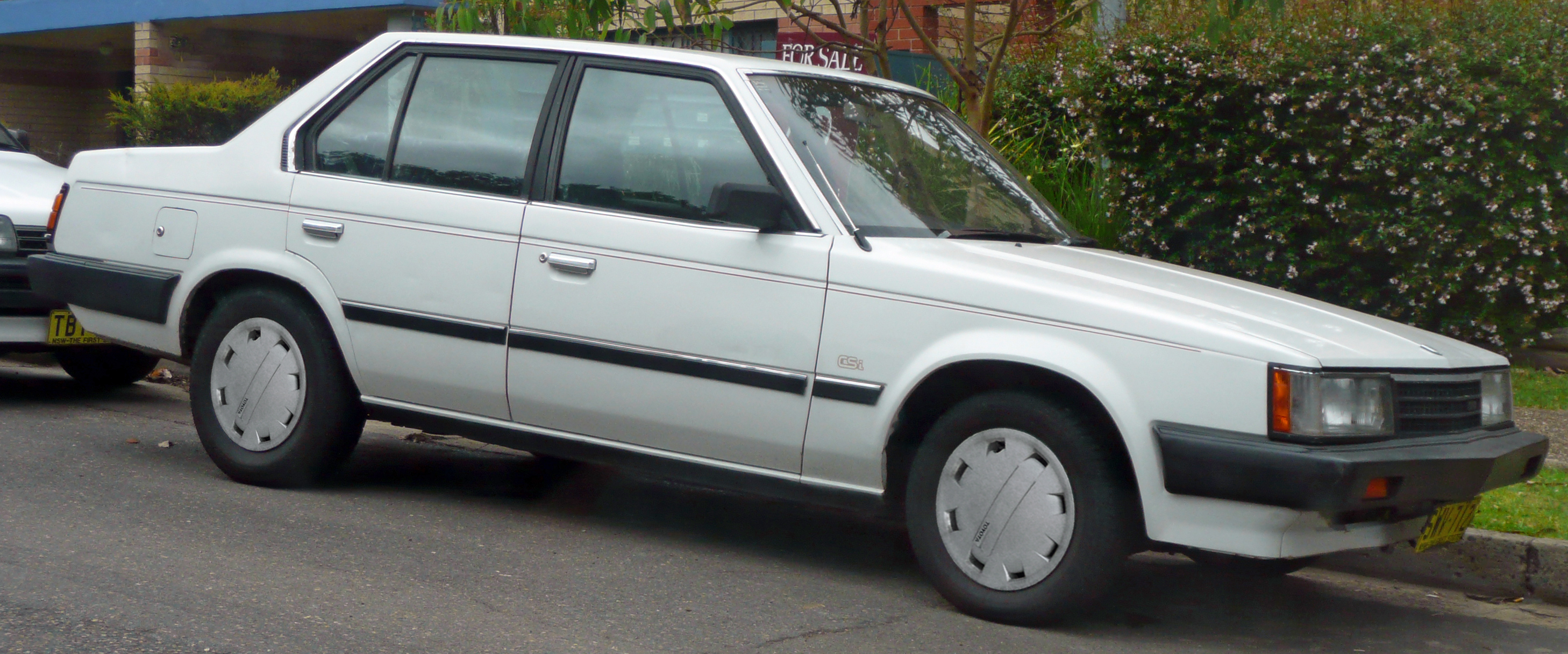
Facelift Toyota Corona CSi sedan (RT142, Australia)

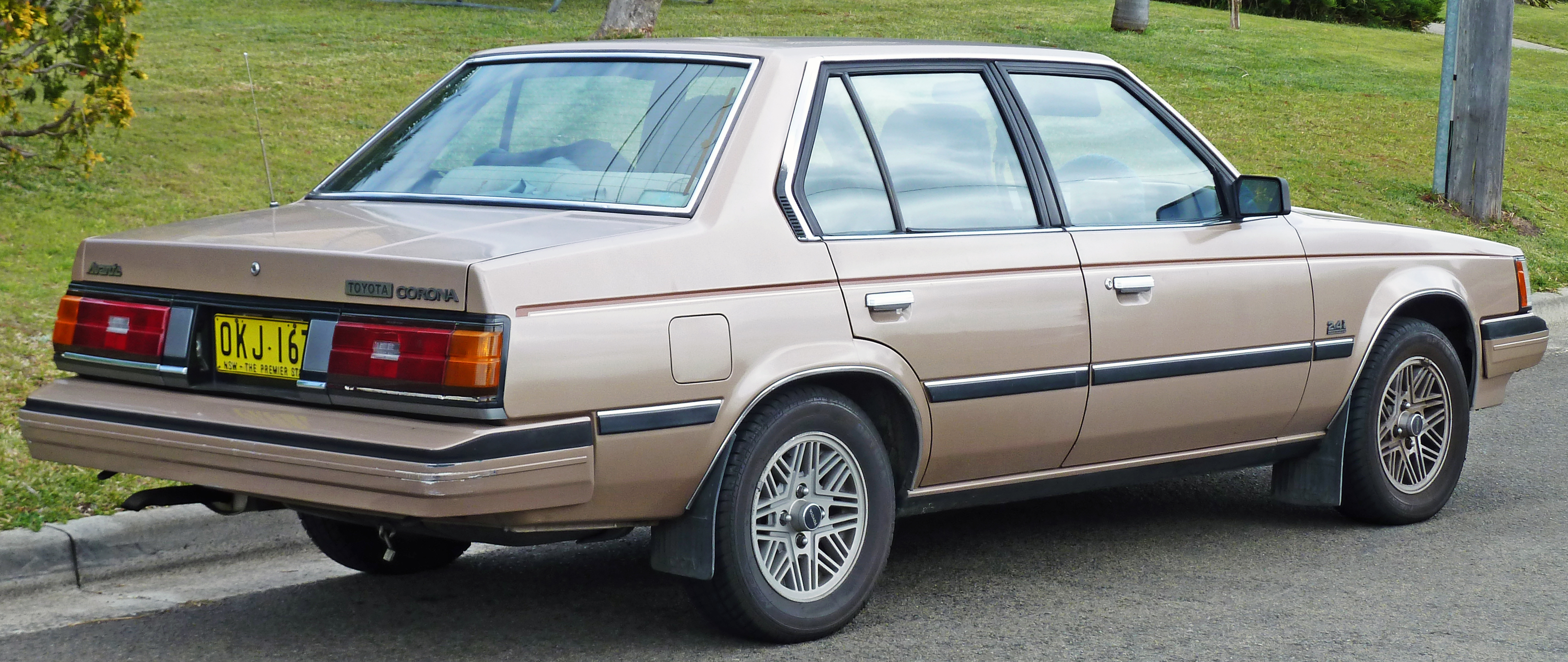
Facelift Toyota Corona Avante sedan (RT142, Australia)

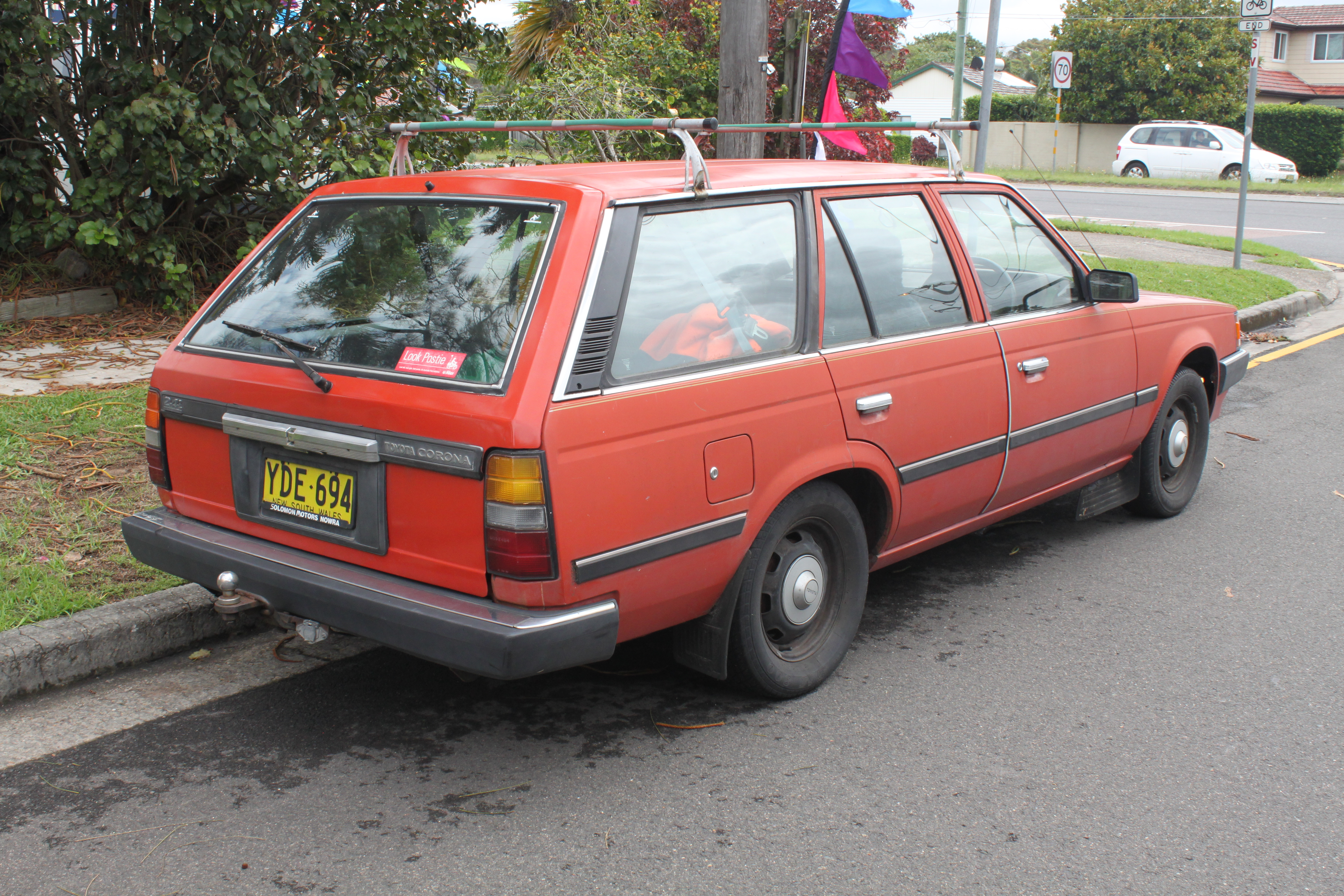
Facelift Toyota Corona CSi wagon (RT142, Australia)

New Zealand

1983 onwards

- Standard, DX, GX
  - 4dr sedans
  - 83 hp (3A-U)
  - GX, EX
  - 4dr sedan/2dr hardtop
  - 100 hp (1S-U)
- GT
  - 4dr sedan/2dr hardtop
  - 130 hp (4A-GE)
- GT-T, GT-TR
  - 4dr sedan/2dr hardtop
  - 160 hp (3T-GTEU)

==== Taxi ====
The special-bodied taxi version was a spinoff of the T140, used specially as taxicabs in Costa Rica, Hong Kong, Japan, Macau, Panama and Singapore. It was first introduced with the 1.8-litre 1C diesel engine in January 1982 (CT140). In September a 1.8-litre LPG version (YT140) was added to the lineup. In addition to getting a new rear end and a taller, more upright roof line for a more comfortable rear seat, alterations were also made to the headlights and grille. While based on the T140, the front and rear sections took their design cues from the A60 Carina. In December 1986 the car underwent a light facelift, and the diesel option was upgraded to the 2-litre 2C version (CT141).

The car was not generally sold for private use. After November 1991, the diesel option was no longer available for the Japanese market but was still available for export (e.g. Macau). Production only came to an end in April 1998, generally being replaced by the S150-series Crown (later renamed Comfort). This marked the end of the Corona taxi line. Most 140/141-series Corona taxis have been long replaced with newer vehicles; it did remain in common use for a long time in both Macau and Pakistan.

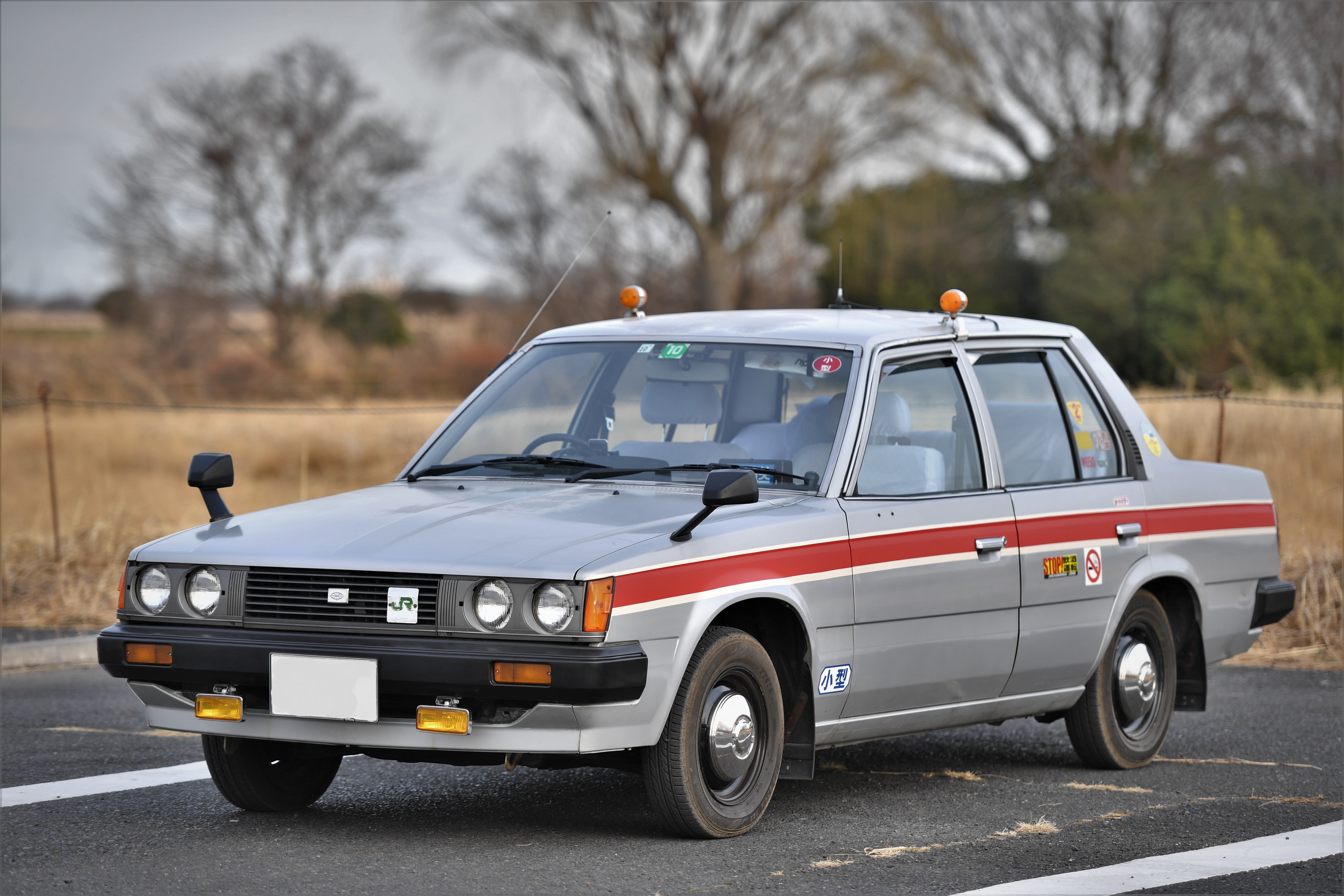
Corona (T140) taxi

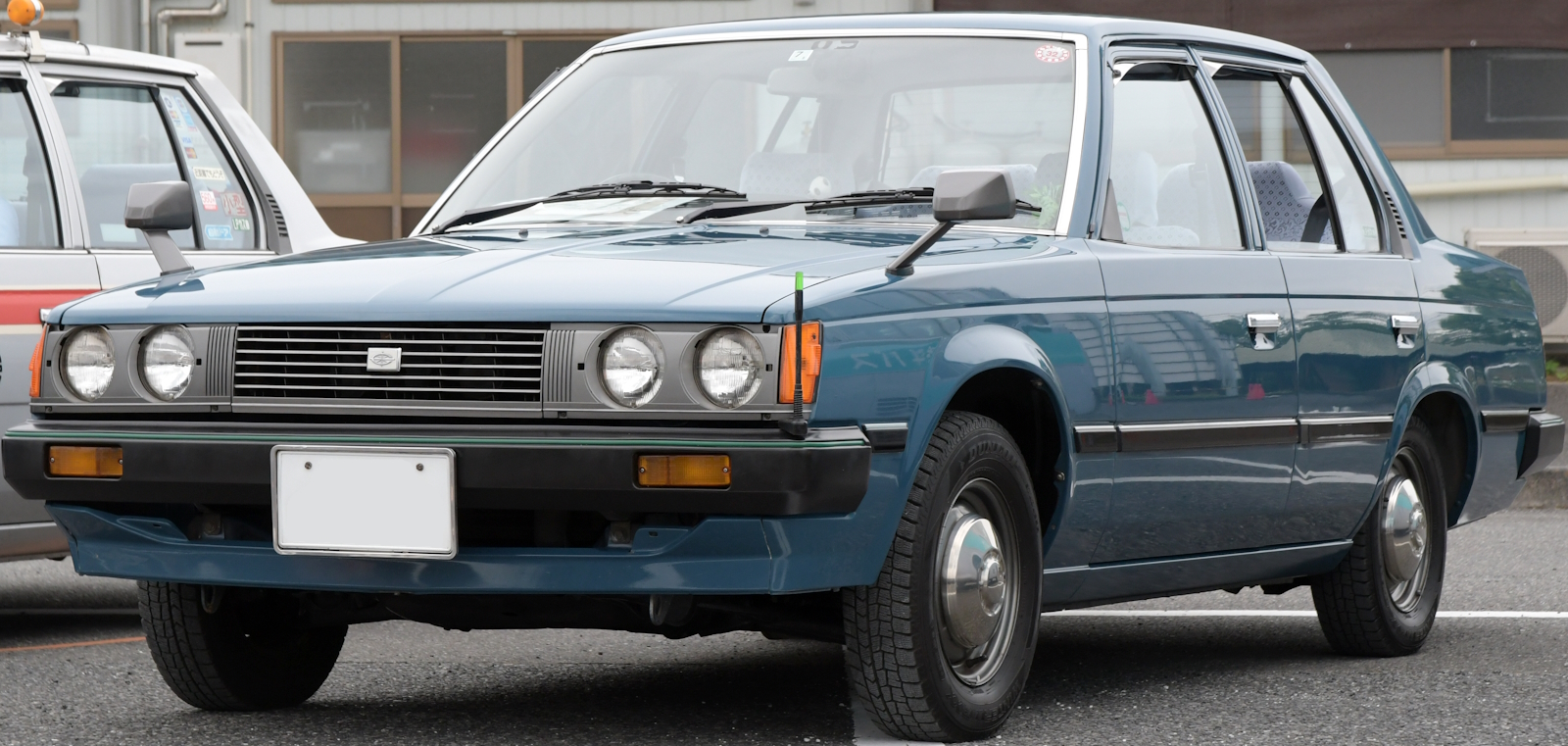
Corona (T140) taxi

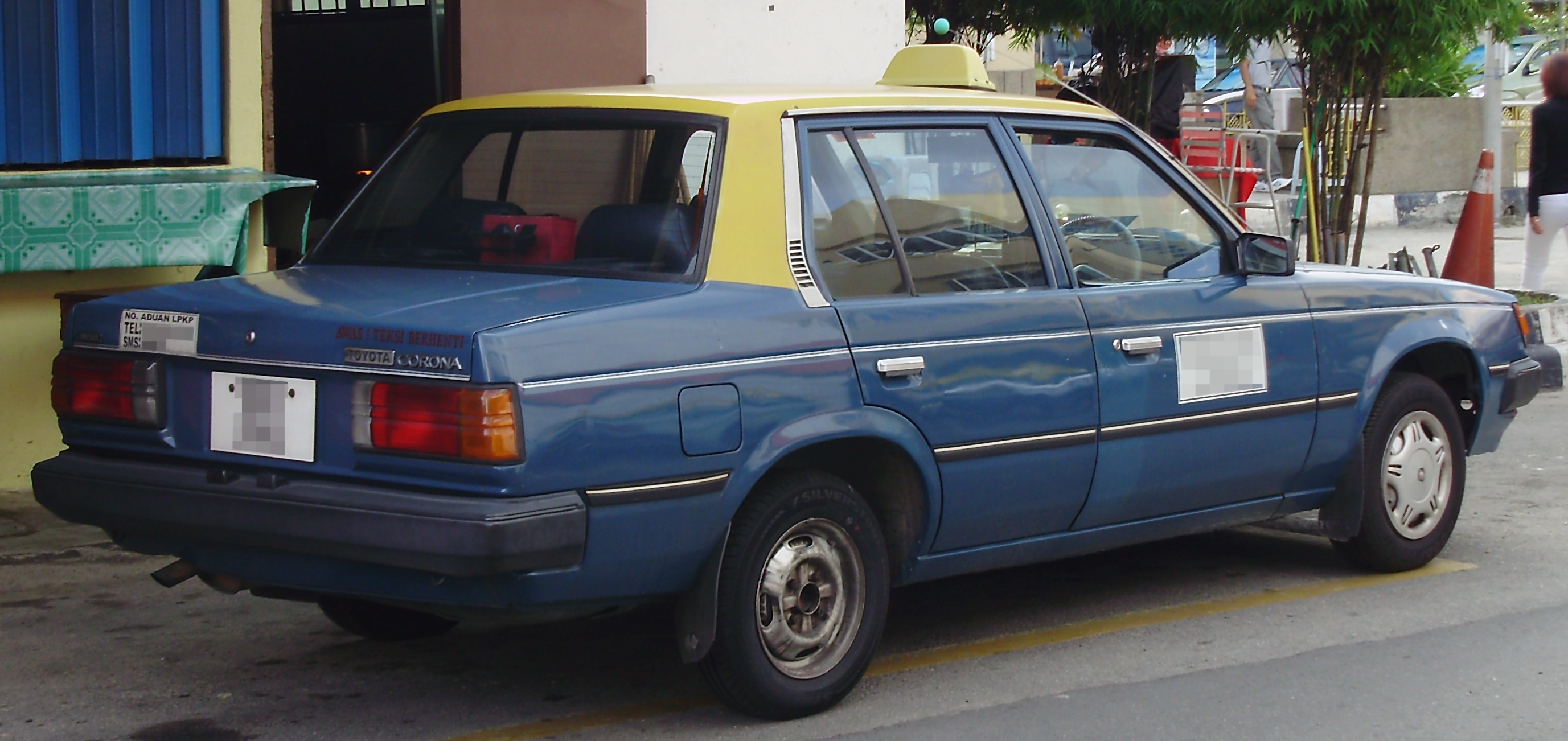
Corona (T140) taxi

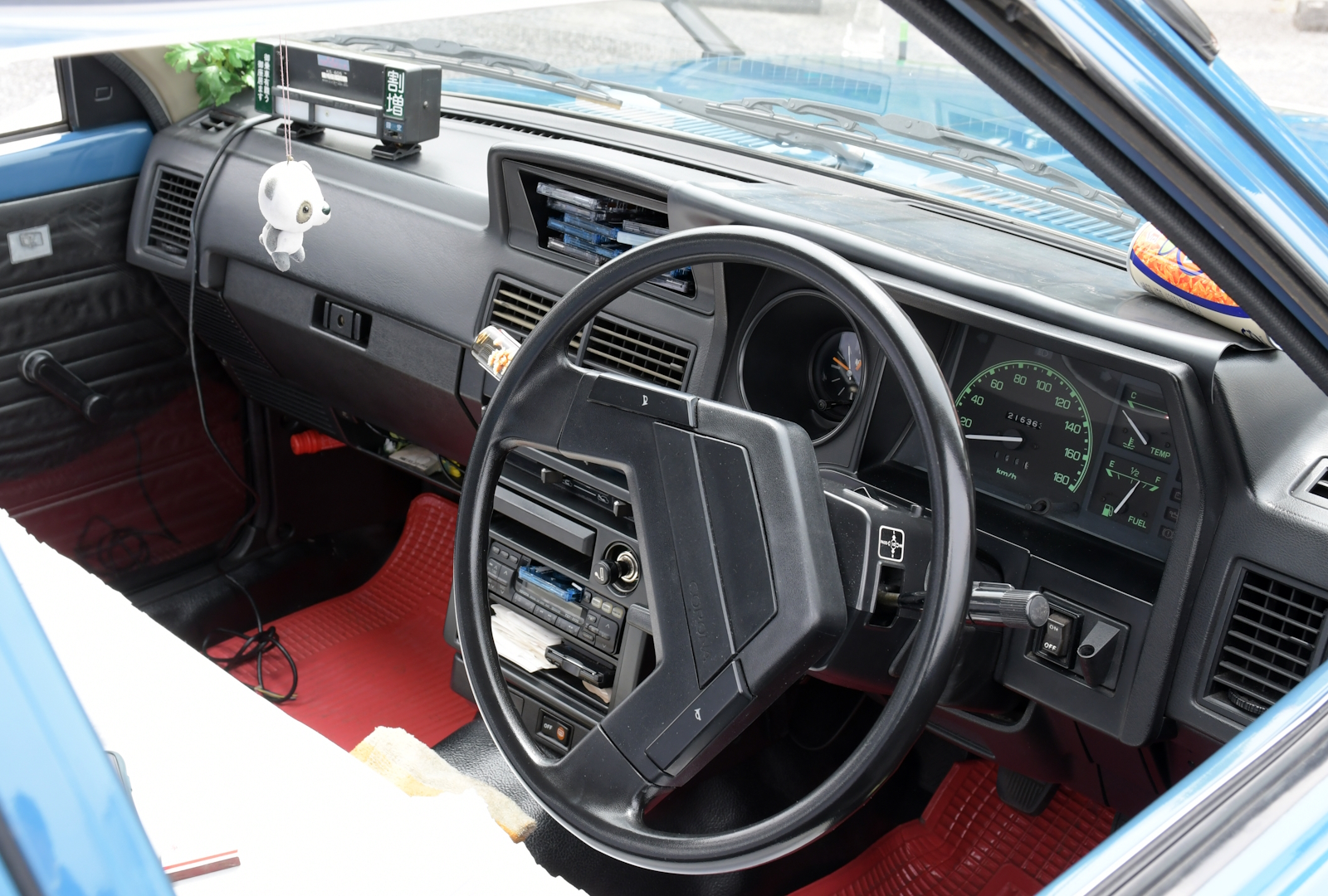
Interior

=== Front-wheel-drive model (T150, T160; 1983) ===
Seventh generation Front-wheel-drive model
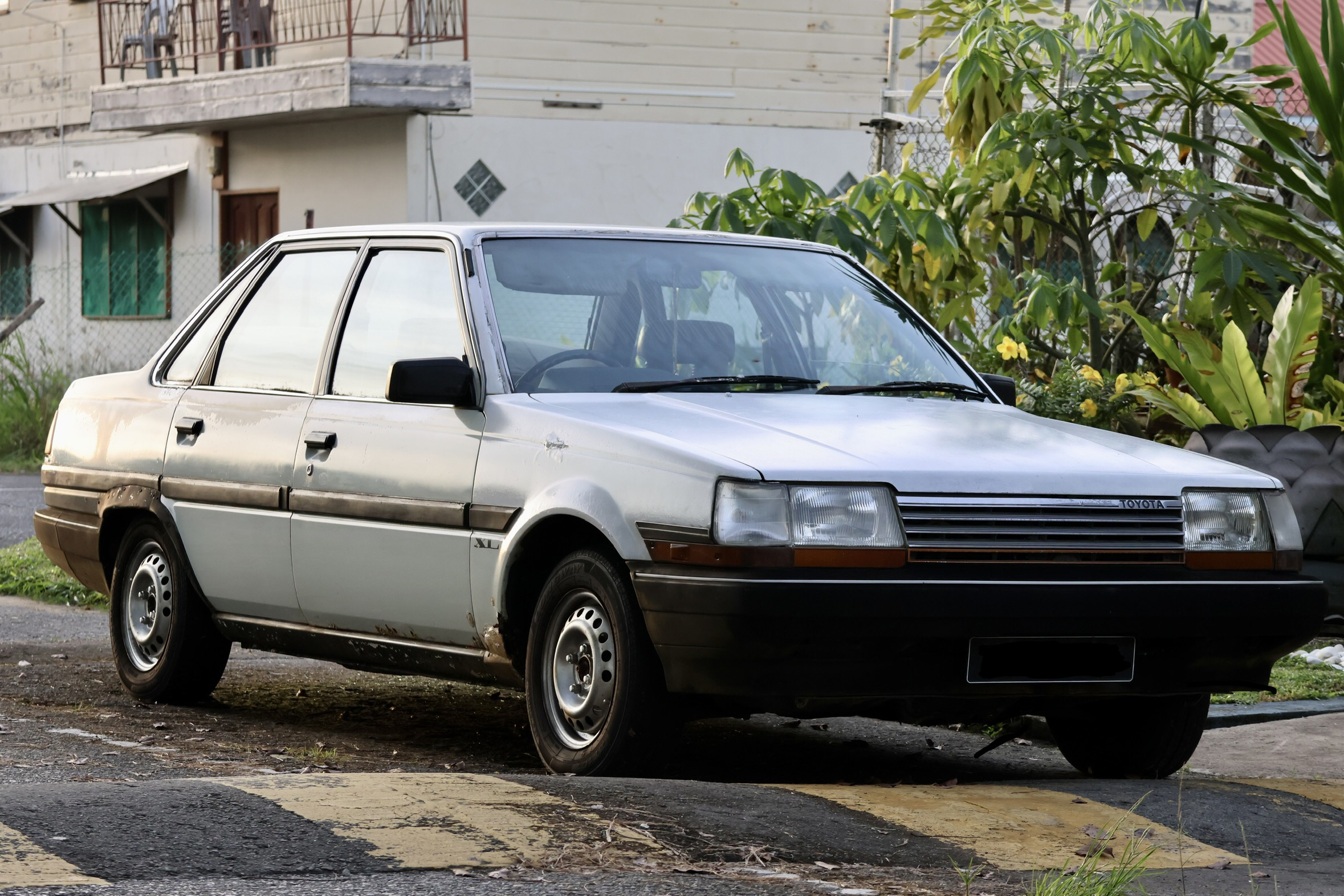
- Pre-facelift Toyota Corona 1.6 XL (AT151, Brunei)

Overview
- Model code: T150
- Also called: Toyota Carina II (Europe)
- Production: January 1983 – December 1987
- Assembly: Japan: Toyota, Aichi (Tsutsumi plant); New Zealand: Thames; Indonesia: North Jakarta (PT. Multi Astra)

Body and chassis
- Body style: 4-door sedan; 5-door liftback; 2-door coupé
- Layout: Front-engine, front-wheel-drive
- Related: Toyota Carina (T150); Toyota Celica (T160)

Powertrain
- Engine: Petrol: 1.5 L 3A-LU I4 (AT150); 1.6 L 4A-L/LU I4 (AT151, export); 1.6 L 4A-GELU I4 (AT160); 1.8 L 1S-iLU/ELU I4 (ST150/ST160); 1.8 L 4S-FiLU I4 (ST161); 2.0 L 2S-E I4 (ST151, export); 2.0 L 3S-GELU I4 (ST162); Diesel: 2.0 L 2C-L I4 (CT150)

Dimensions
- Wheelbase: 2,515 mm (99.0 in) (T150); 2,525 mm (99.4 in) (T160)
- Length: 4,330–4,390 mm (170.5–172.8 in) (T150); 4,360–4,415 mm (171.7–173.8 in) (T160)
- Width: 1,670 mm (65.7 in) (T150); 1,690 mm (66.5 in) (T160)
- Height: 1,365 mm (53.7 in) (T150); 1,295 mm (51.0 in) (T160)
- Curb weight: 930–1,060 kg (2,050.3–2,336.9 lb) (T150); 1,030–1,010 kg (2,270.8–2,226.7 lb) (T160)

The T150 Corona was known as the Corona FF, selling alongside the more traditional and recently facelifted rear-wheel-drive Corona (T140-series). Essentially a shortened version of the Camry, this was part of Toyota's very cautious approach to introducing front-wheel-drive vehicles. Toyota returned to a platform naming tradition, assigned to different body styles this generation was made available, abandoned in 1978. The Corona FF as introduced in January 1983 was only available with a five-door liftback body style, and only with the carburetted 100 PS (74 kW) 1.8-litre 1S-LU inline-four. In October 1983 a more traditional four-door sedan was added, and the T150 gradually became the main part of the Corona lineup as the T140-series shrank in importance.

In 1983, the T150 Corona became the first Japanese made car with digital colour liquid crystal gauges.

Along with the new bodystyle, more engines were also added: a smaller 1.5-litre 3A-LU at the bottom, while the 1.8 was now available with fuel injection (1S-ELU) and 115 PS (85 kW). There was also a two-litre diesel (2C-L) and the carburetted 1.8 was replaced by the central point injected 1S-iLU, with an extra five horsepower. In 1984, this chassis was also used as the basis for a new, front-wheel-drive version of the Carina sedan.

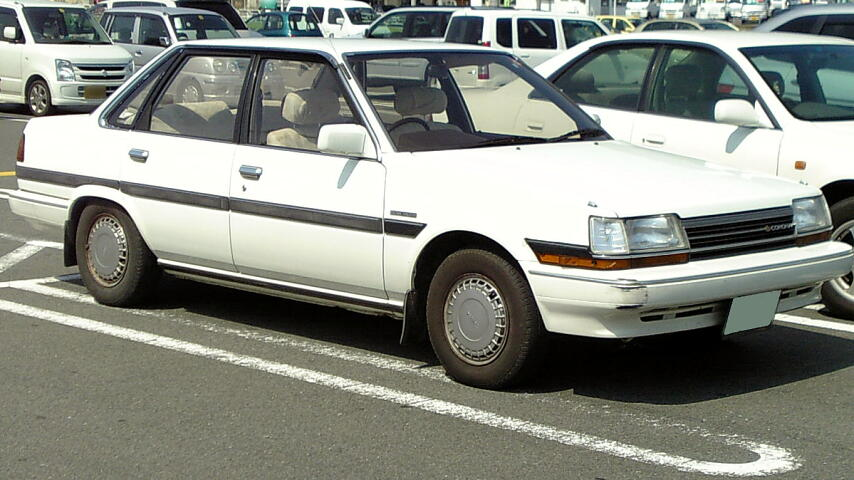
Facelift 1985 Toyota Corona (Japan)

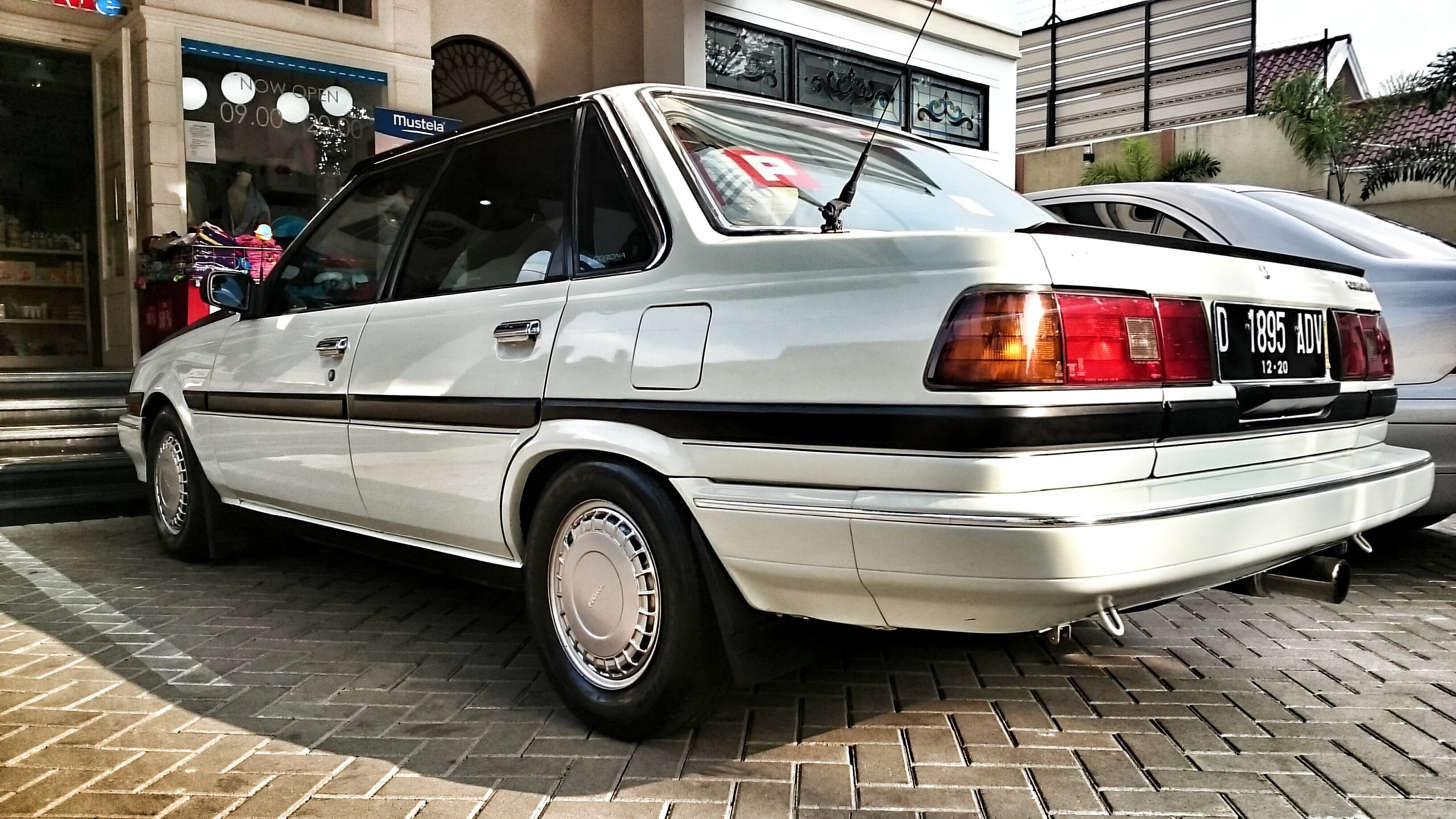
Rear view of Facelift 1986 Toyota Corona EX-Saloon (AT151, Indonesia)

In August 1985 the Corona underwent a small change, largely consisting of new, bigger taillights. Also new was the related Celica and Carina range. With a more sporting chassis and five-lug wheels (rather than four), this received the new T160 chassis code. This chassis, as well as the twin-cam two-litre 3S-GELU engine with 160 PS (118 kW) (JIS) at 6400 rpm was used for the new Corona 2.0 GT and GT-R versions. A sporting 1.8 SX-R version (1S-ELU) of the 160-series sedan was also added in late 1985.

Export markets

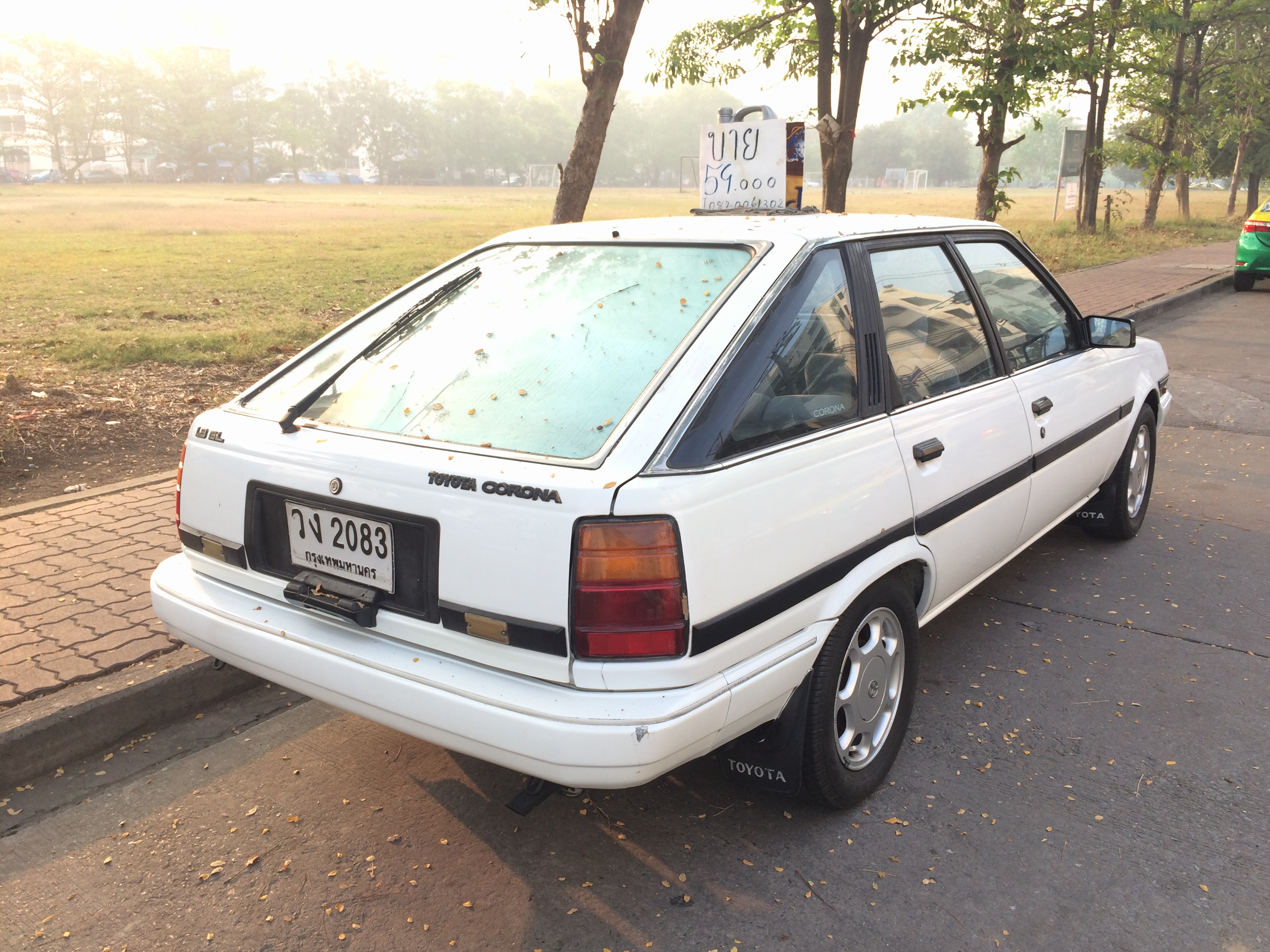
Pre-facelift Toyota Corona 1.8 GL Liftback (AT151, Thailand)

The Corona hatchback was eventually dropped in Australia in 1983 in favour of the larger Camry and the previous-generation saloon and estate were dropped in 1987 to be replaced by the Toyota Camry (V20), but in New Zealand, Toyota continued to offer the Corona, assembled locally at Toyota's plant in Thames, New Zealand. Initially, the T150 Corona was launched in New Zealand in 1983 as a hatchback only, to complement the previous generation T140 Corona saloon and estate which continued to be sold in the New Zealand market as in Australia. However, the T140 saloon was dropped in 1985 and the T150 Corona saloon was then launched to replace it. With suspension fettled by racer Chris Amon, the New Zealand Coronas had carburetted 1.8s or a fuel-injected 2-litre engine. Later, Toyota New Zealand followed Australia's lead and eventually dropped the Corona in 1996, instead marketing the Australian-built Camry as its offering in the mid-size segment of the market.

Export-market Coronas were generally fitted with the 1.6-litre 4A engine, but in many markets (New Zealand, Southeast Asia, Latin America) the T150 Corona was also available with 2.0-litre engines. In Southeast Asia, the 1.6 EX-Saloon with no emissions gear (4A-L) produces 79 PS (58 kW) at 5600 rpm. In Indonesia, the original T150 was sold as the Corona GL and after the 1985 facelift it became the Corona EX-Saloon (AT151).

Toyota's large family car lineup in Europe was quite confusing when looking over the past 25 years. The 1970 through 1983 Carina sister models had been sold in most of Europe, but in 1984 they were replaced with the "Carina II" – which was really the 1983 model Corona as sold in Japan with alterations to the headlights, grille and trim (the Carina in Japan at that time was a similar but boxier vehicle).

==== Corona Coupé (1985) ====
When the Celica was realigned from its former Toyota "A-series" RWD platform to share the Corona "T-series" FWD platform, the Celica notchback was rebranded as the Corona Coupé in Japan, which was identical to the internationally available Celica version with the only difference being the removal of the retractable headlights in favor of conventional fixed items. This replaced the rear-wheel-drive T140 Corona Coupé, leaving only a few vans and sedans in the RWD Corona lineup. The T160-series cars have a slightly longer wheelbase and a wider track (front and rear) than the Celica version available elsewhere. The Corona Coupé remained exclusive to Toyopet Store Japanese dealerships along with the larger, all new Toyota Soarer, while the Celica liftback and convertible remained at Toyota Corolla Store locations. The Corona Coupé was manufactured from 1985 until 1989 when it was replaced by the Toyota Corona EXiV four-door hardtop coupe. In 1994, the two-door coupe was renamed as the Toyota Curren and sold at Toyota Vista Store locations. The bigger and more luxurious Toyota Soarer was available alongside the Corona Coupé at Toyopet Store locations, but the Soarer was more popular, and the Corona Coupé was no longer offered.

The Corona Coupé came with three engines; the SOHC 1.8-litre 1S-iLU and two twin-cams, the 1.6-litre 4A-GELU or the 2-litre 3S-GELU. Chassis codes are ST160, AT160, and ST162. In May 1988, the 1.8-litre engine was replaced by the twin-cam 4S-FiLU.

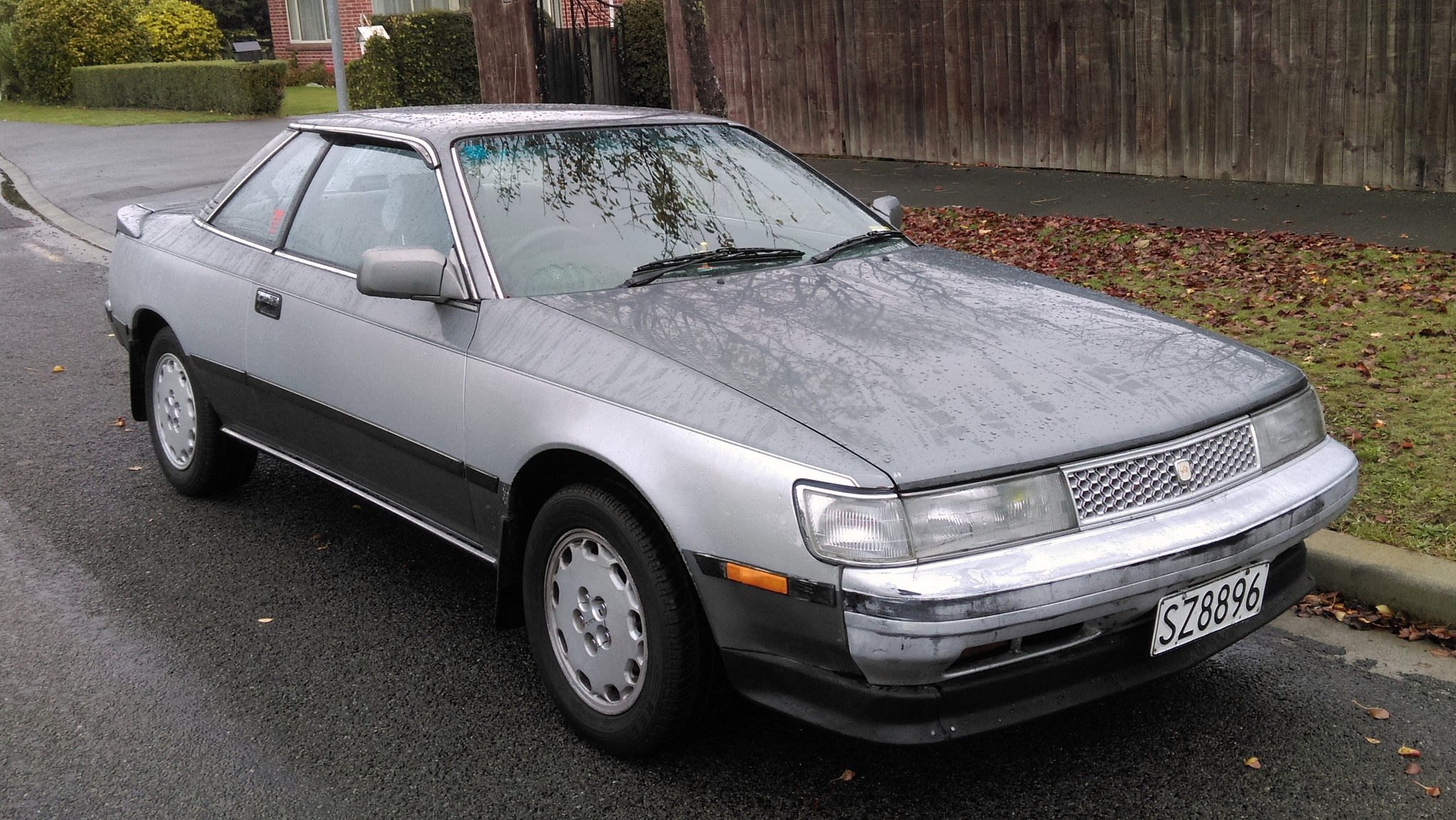
1987 Corona 2.0 VX Coupé (ST162)

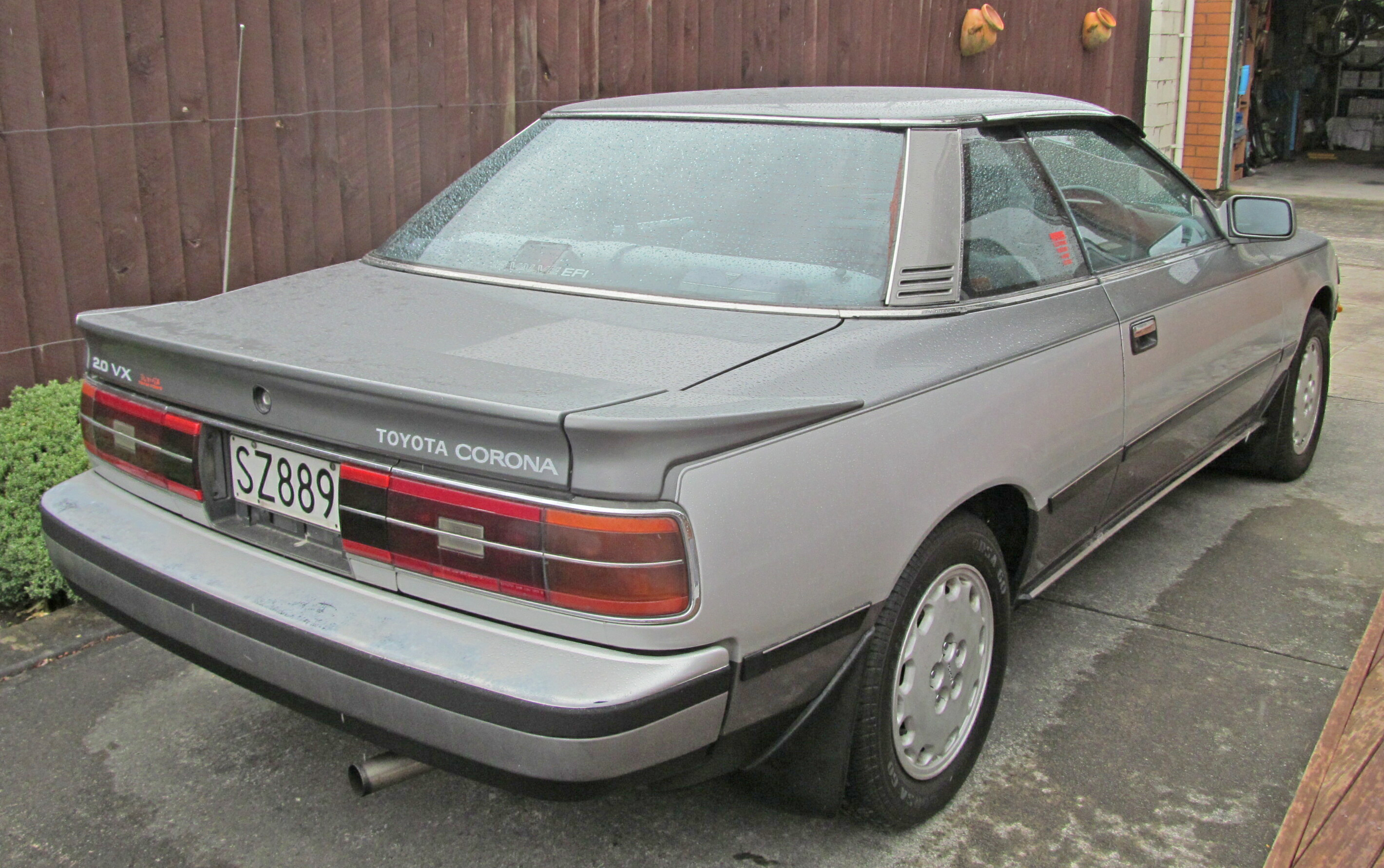
1987 Corona 2.0 VX Coupé (ST162)

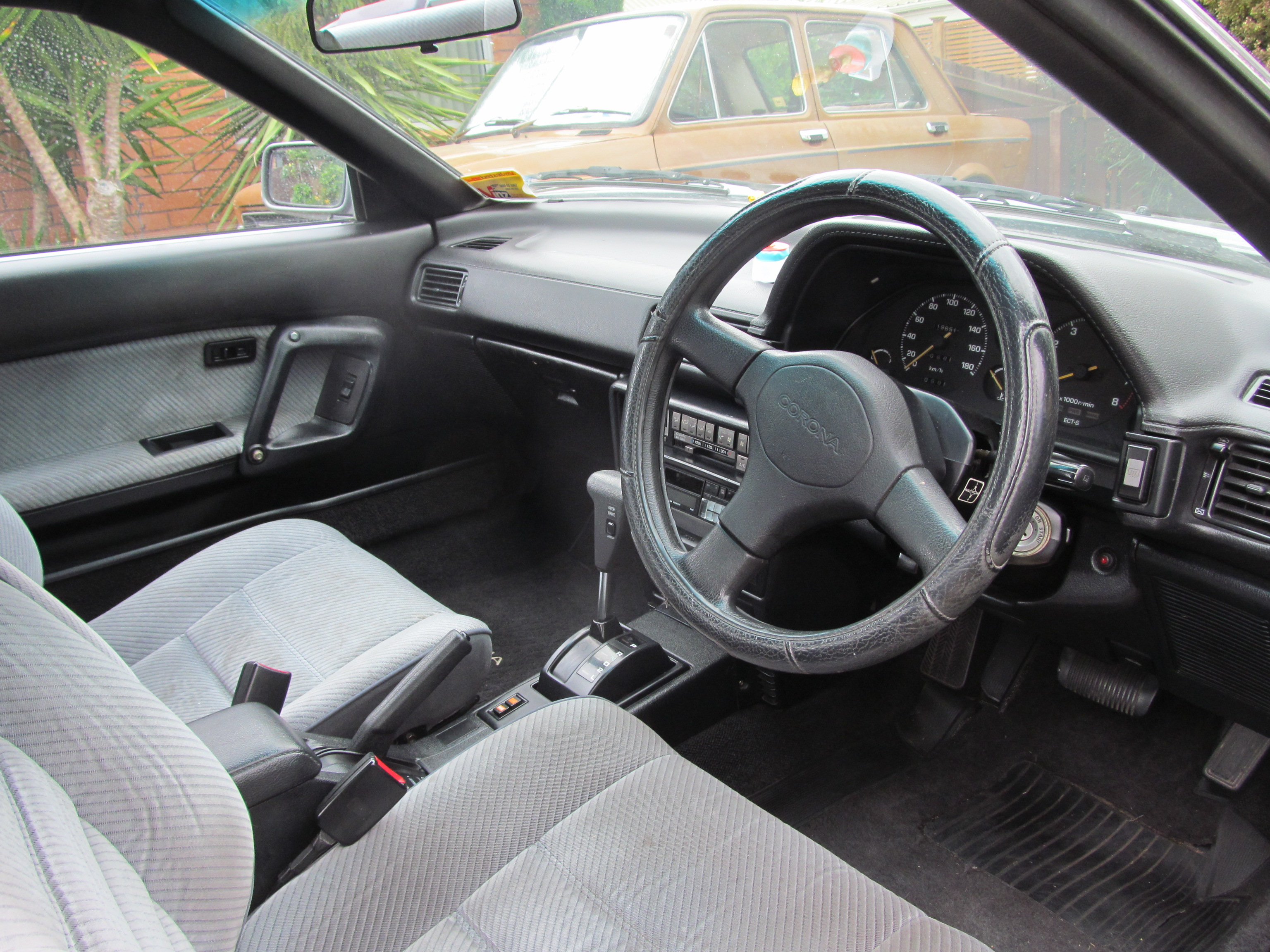
Interior

== Eighth generation (T170; 1987) ==
Eighth generation
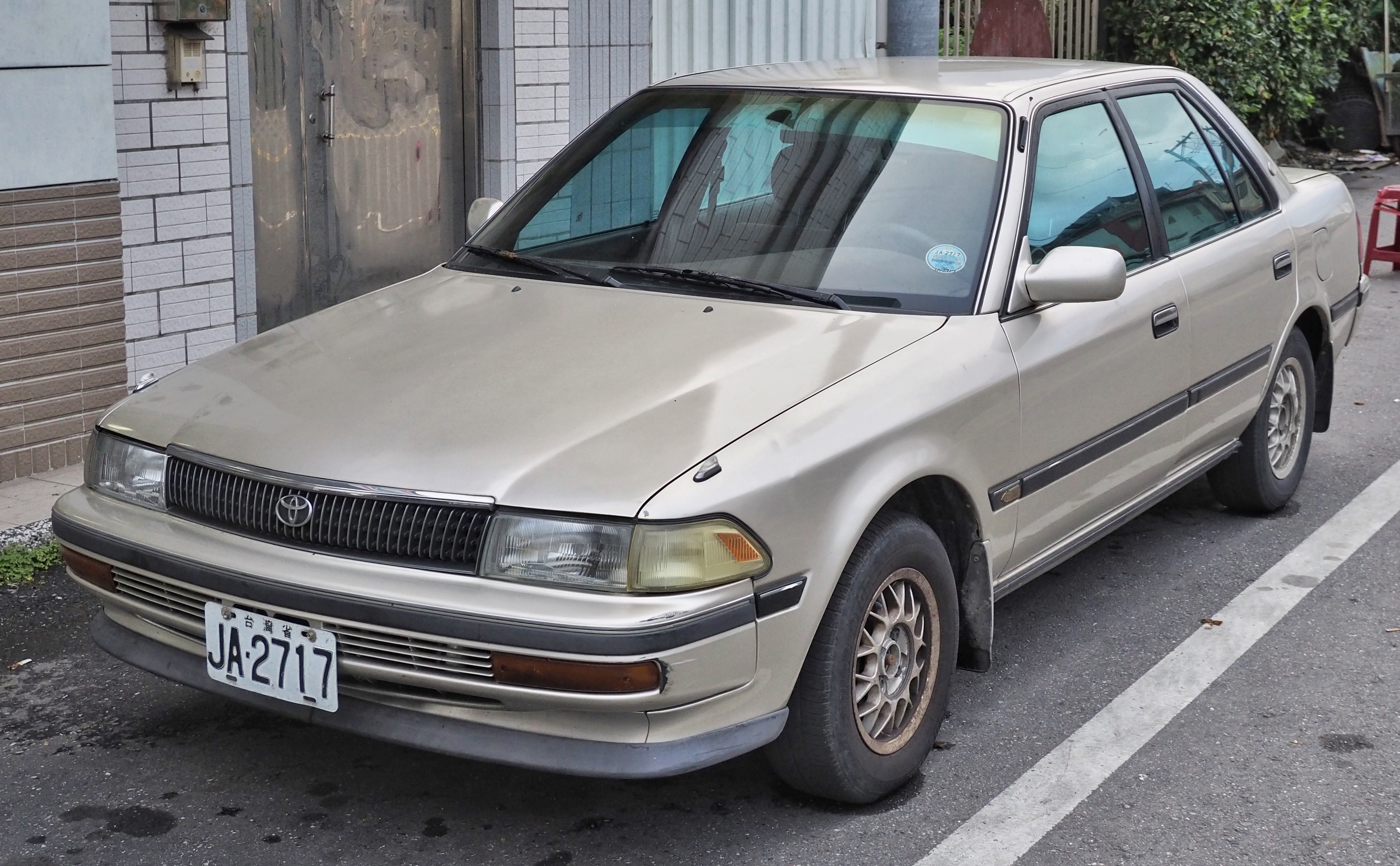
- 1990 Toyota Corona sedan 1.6 GLi (AT171, Taiwan)

Overview
- Model code: T170
- Also called: Toyota Carina II (Europe)
- Production: December 1987 – May 1992; 1988–1995 (Taiwan)
- Assembly: Japan: Toyota, Aichi (Tsutsumi plant); New Zealand: Thames (Toyota New Zealand); Indonesia: North Jakarta (PT. Multi Astra); Philippines: Parañaque (Toyota Motor Philippines); Taiwan: Zhongli

Body and chassis
- Body style: 4-door sedan; 5-door liftback; 5-door station wagon/van
- Layout: Front-engine, front-wheel-drive; Front-engine, all-wheel-drive (AT175)
- Related: Toyota Carina; Toyota Celica

Powertrain
- Engine: Petrol: 1.5 L 3E I4 (ET176V); 1.5 L 5A-F/FE I4 (AT170); 1.6 L 4A-F/FE I4 (AT171, AT175); 1.8 L 4S-Fi/FE I4 (ST170); 2.0 L 3S-FE I4 (ST171); 2.0 L 3S-GE I4 (ST171); Diesel: 2.0 L 2C-III I4 (CT170/176V)
- Transmission: 4-Speed Manual; 5-Speed Manual; 4-Speed Automatic

Dimensions
- Wheelbase: 2,525 mm (99.4 in); 2,735 mm (107.7 in) (Super Roomy)
- Length: 4,435 mm (174.6 in) (van/wagon); 4,480 mm (176.4 in) (sedan/liftback); 4,690 mm (184.6 in) (Super Roomy)
- Width: 1,690 mm (66.5 in)
- Height: 1,370 mm (53.9 in); 1,400 mm (55.1 in) (van/wagon)
- Curb weight: 960–1,250 kg (2,116.4–2,755.8 lb)

Chronology
- Successor: Toyota Caldina (van/wagon)

The Corona and the Toyota Carina continued to increase in size, introduced in December 1987. Because of Japanese taxation laws, both models got to the maximum 1,700 mm (66.9 in) permitted for a lower tax bracket, and in the 1980s and early 1990s, the cars were the same size. The previous generation ST160 Corona Coupé was not renewed with this generation. It did not receive a direct replacement until 1993, when it was renamed as the Toyota Curren.

For this generation, the all-new Corona EXiV four-door hardtop was offered, as only two-door hardtops were previously available. This was the last generation to offer the Corona GT to Japanese buyers, equipped with Toyota's active suspension technology called TEMS included with their "PEGASUS"-branded four-wheel independent suspension and "LASRE"-branded multi-port fuel injection technology on the 3S-GELU engine.

The five-door Corona liftback was sold as the "Corona SF" in Japan, in a much smaller lineup than the four-door sedan. The five-door model proved much more popular in Europe, where, confusingly, it was marketed as the Carina II. The sedan and a wagon were also part of the Carina II lineup, which was a rebadged Corona rather than the T170 Carina sold in Japan. The lightly restyled Carina T170 series derivative was launched in Japan simultaneously with the Corona. In August 1988 a four-wheel-drive Corona was added using All-Trac, powered by the fuel injected, 1.6-litre 4A-FE engine.

In November 1989 the Corona underwent a minor facelift, including a redesigned front grille with densely packed vertical bars rather than the earlier four horizontal ones. The front of the Van remained unchanged. Meanwhile, the taillights and rear fascia were given a horizontal theme and the rear number plate was moved to the bottom of the bumper. The 1.5 and 1.8-litre engines were upgraded to EFI in the 4S-FE and 5A-FE types. Power of the 2.0 GT increased to 165 PS (121 kW), requiring unleaded premium petrol. The Select Saloon, previously a special edition, became a regular catalog model in place of the MX version.

A limited production Corona was sold only in Japan in May 1990, to celebrate 10 million Corona's having been sold, called the Corona Super Roomy. It added 210 mm (8.3 in) to the wheelbase, and was limited to 500 units.

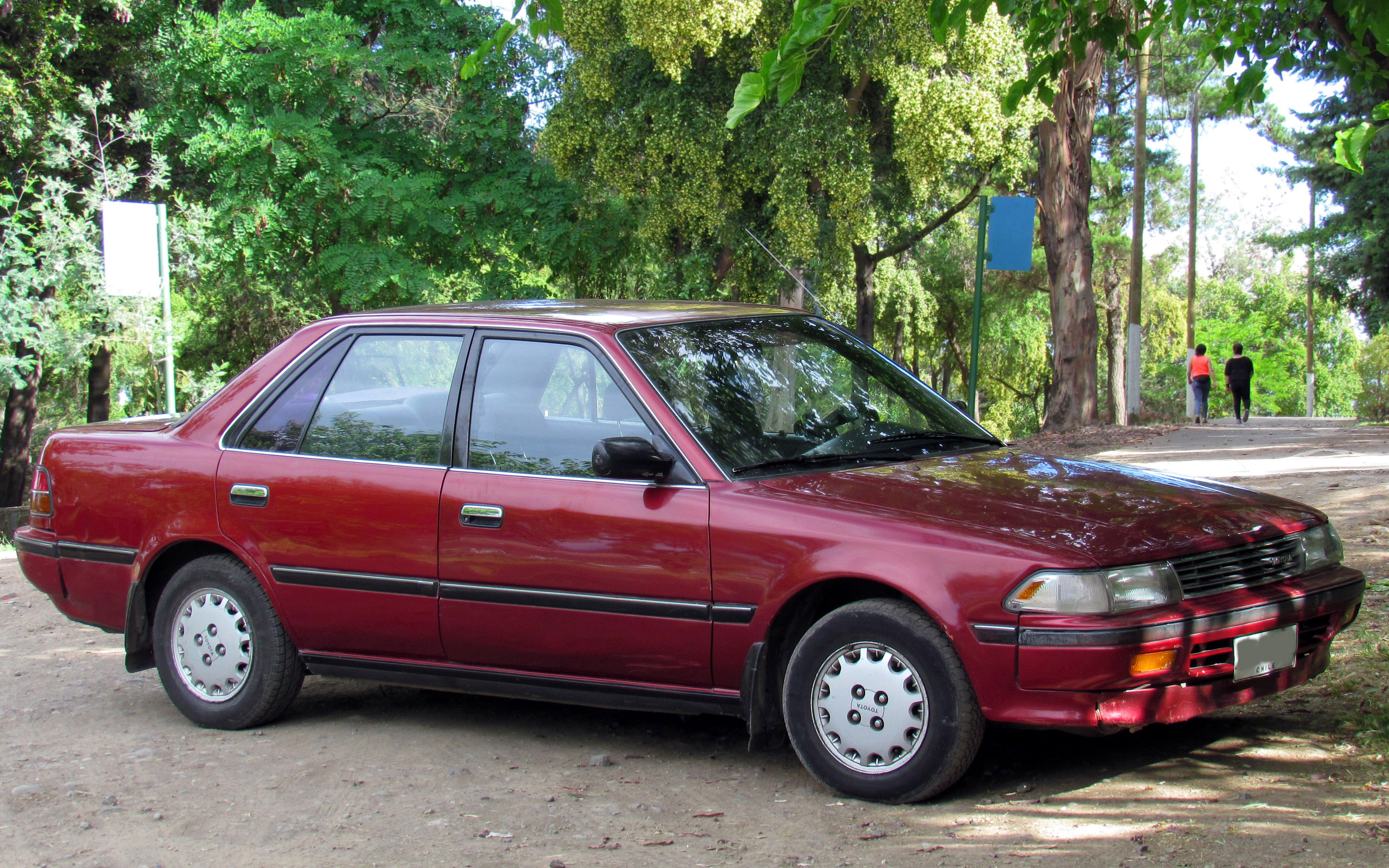
Pre-facelift Toyota Corona 1.6 XL sedan (AT171, Latin American model)

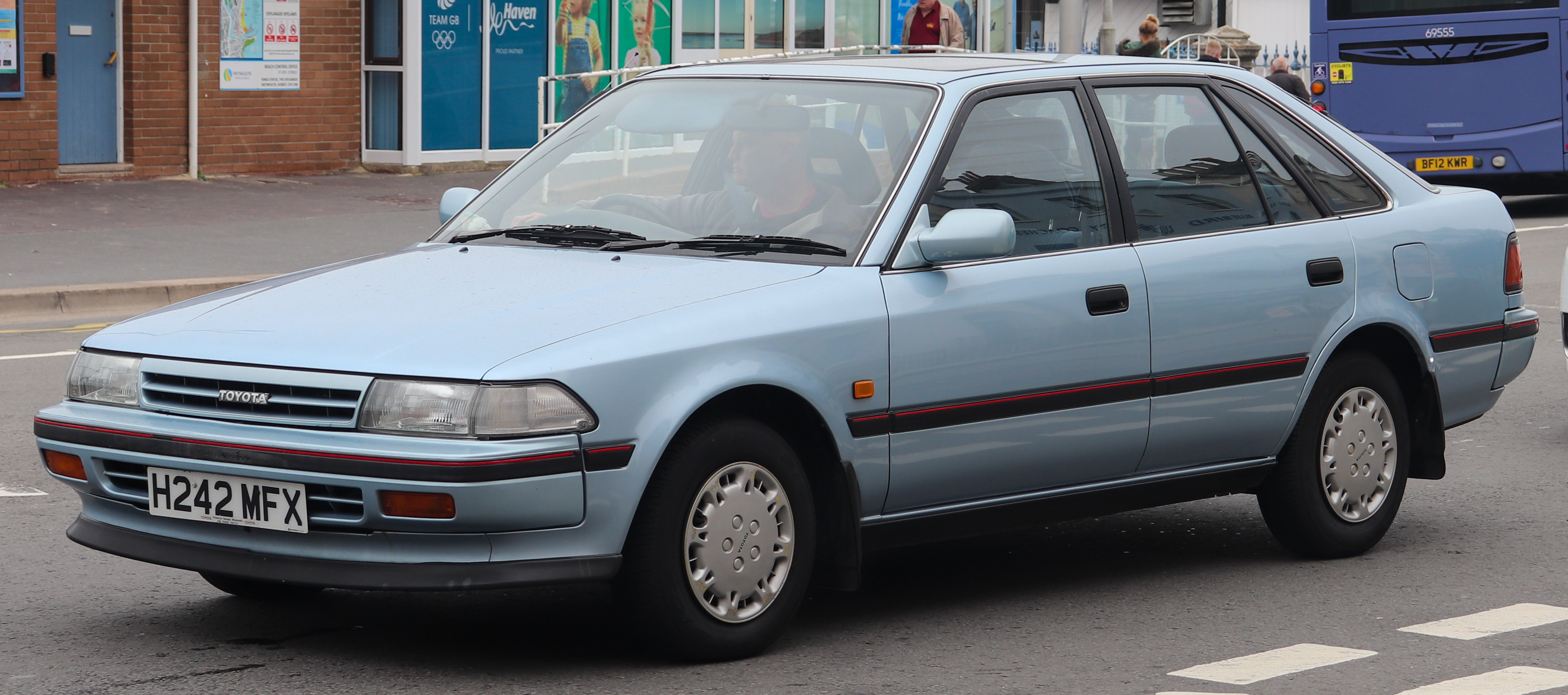
Pre-facelift Toyota Carina II 1 6 GL liftback (AT171, Europe)

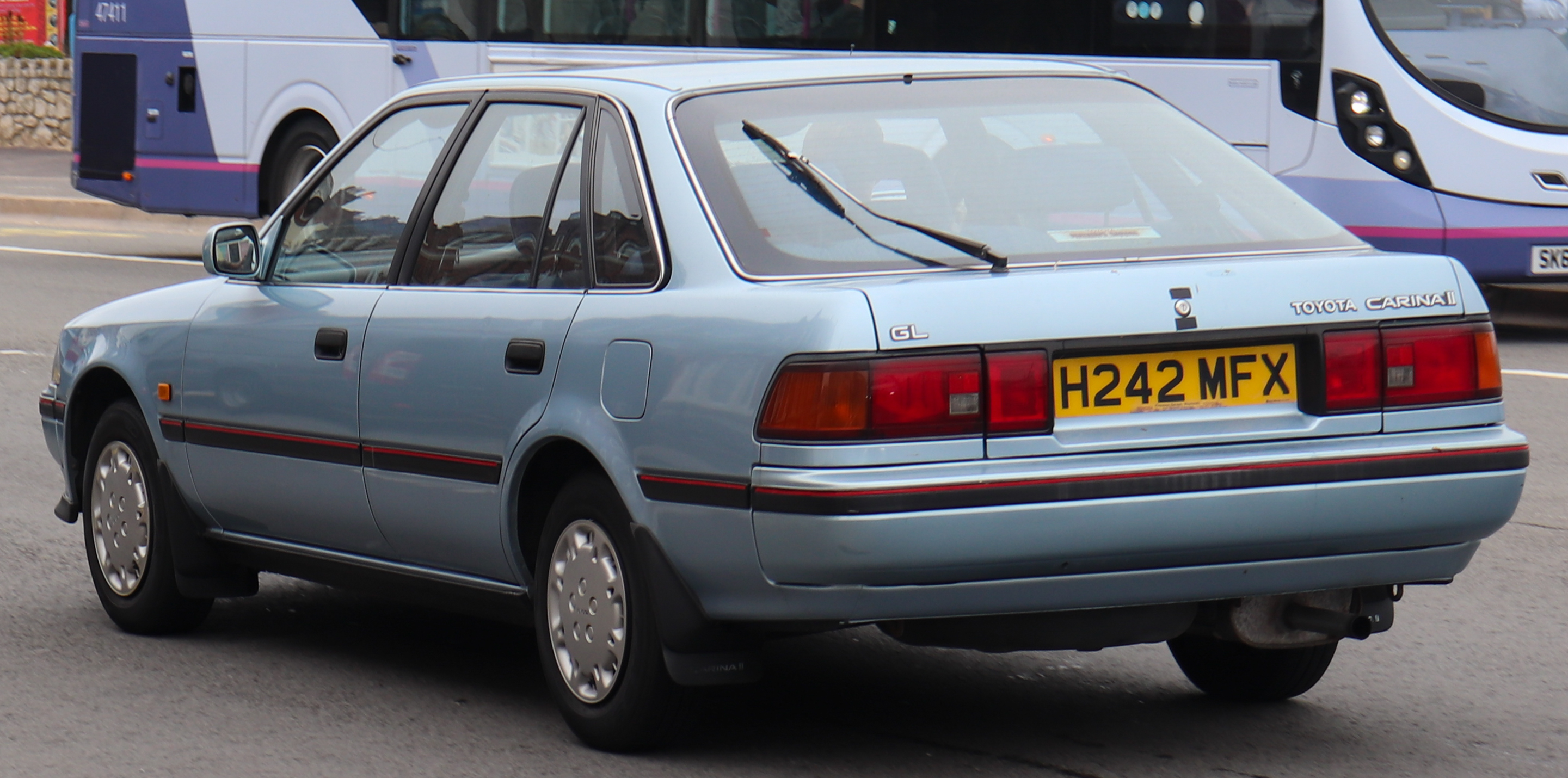
Pre-facelift Toyota Carina II 1 6 GL liftback (AT171, Europe)

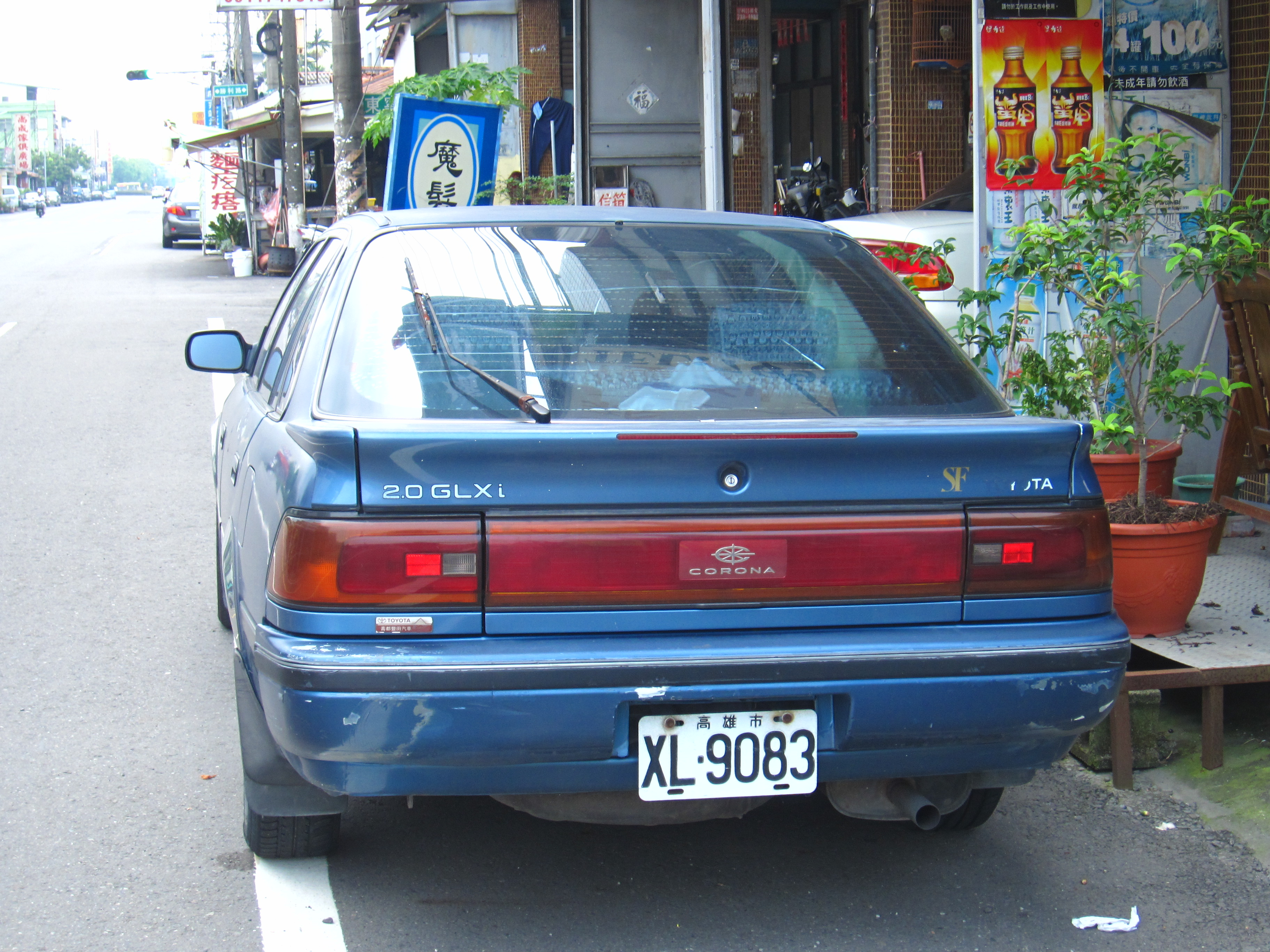
Facelift Toyota Corona 2.0 GLXi liftback (ST171, Taiwan)

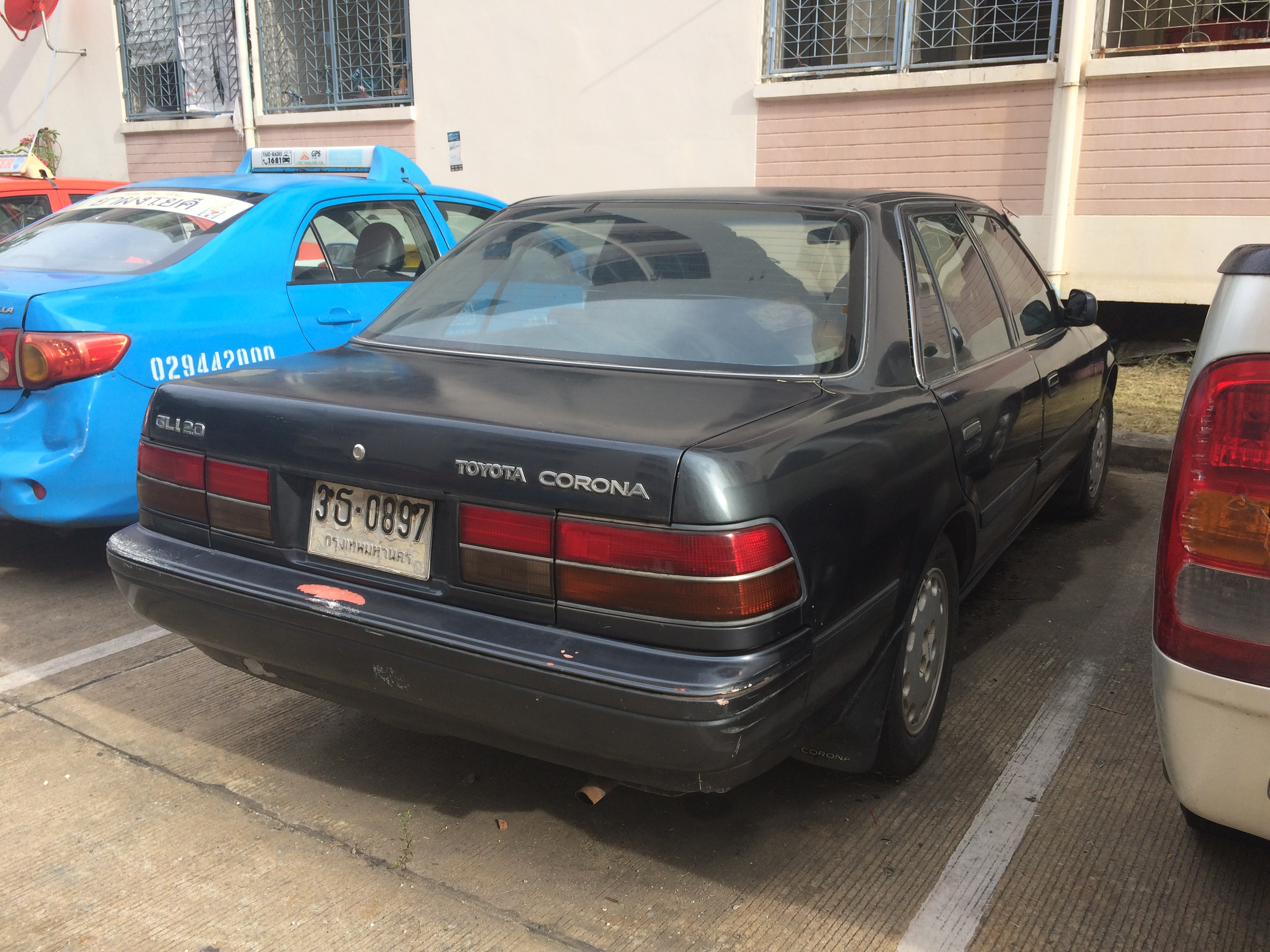
Pre-facelift Toyota Corona 2.0 GLi sedan (ST171, Thailand)

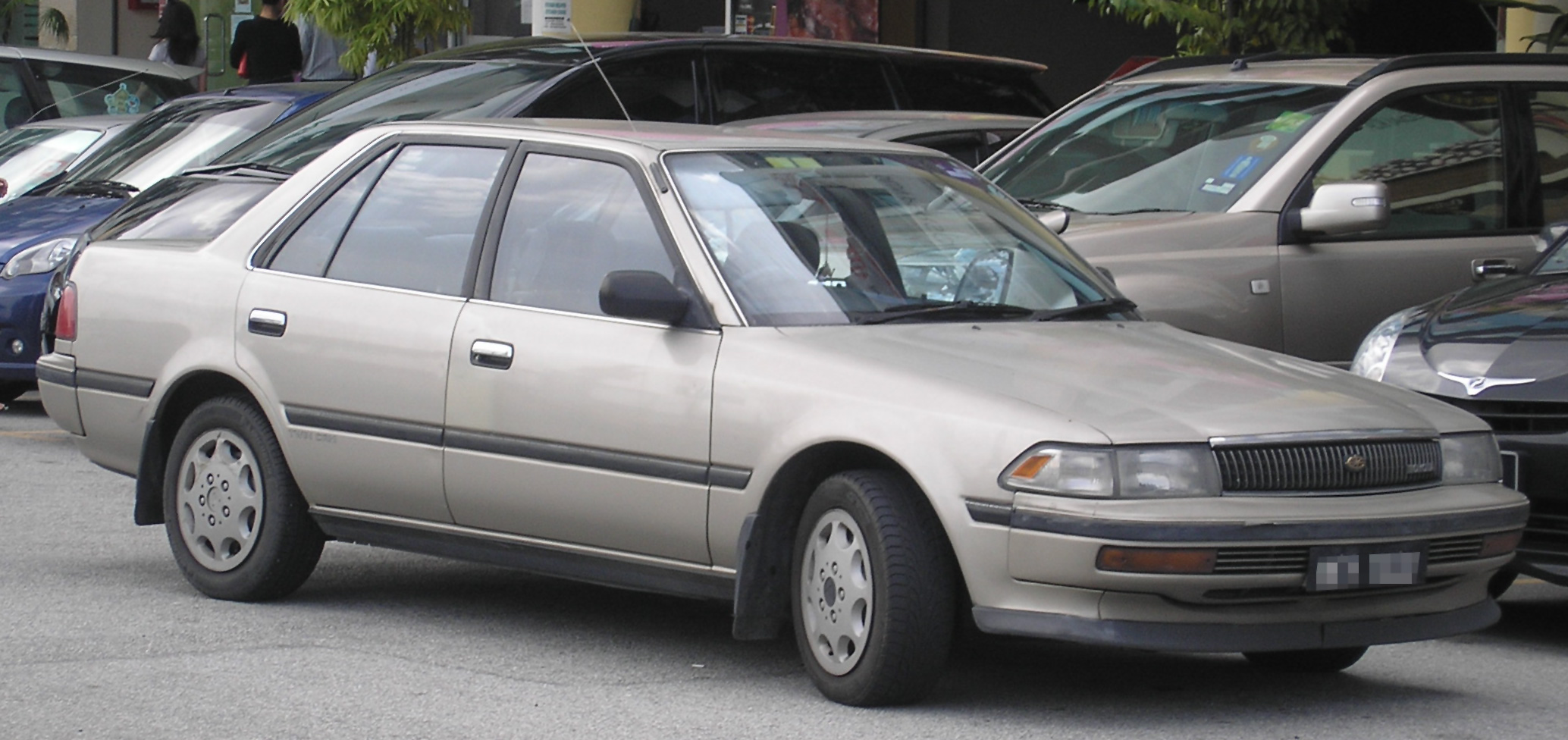
Facelift Toyota Corona 2.0 GLi sedan (ST171, Malaysia)

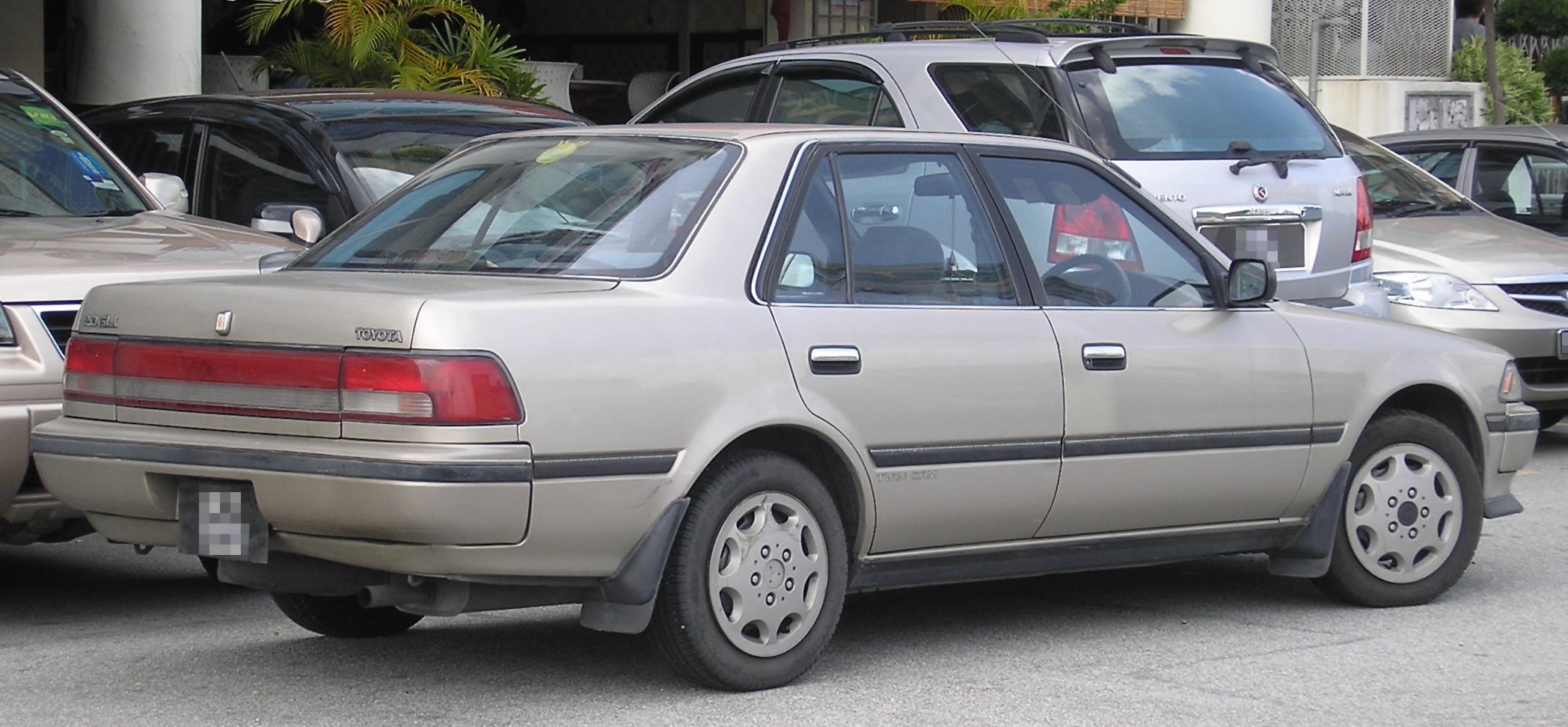
Facelift Toyota Corona 2.0 GLi sedan (ST171, Malaysia)

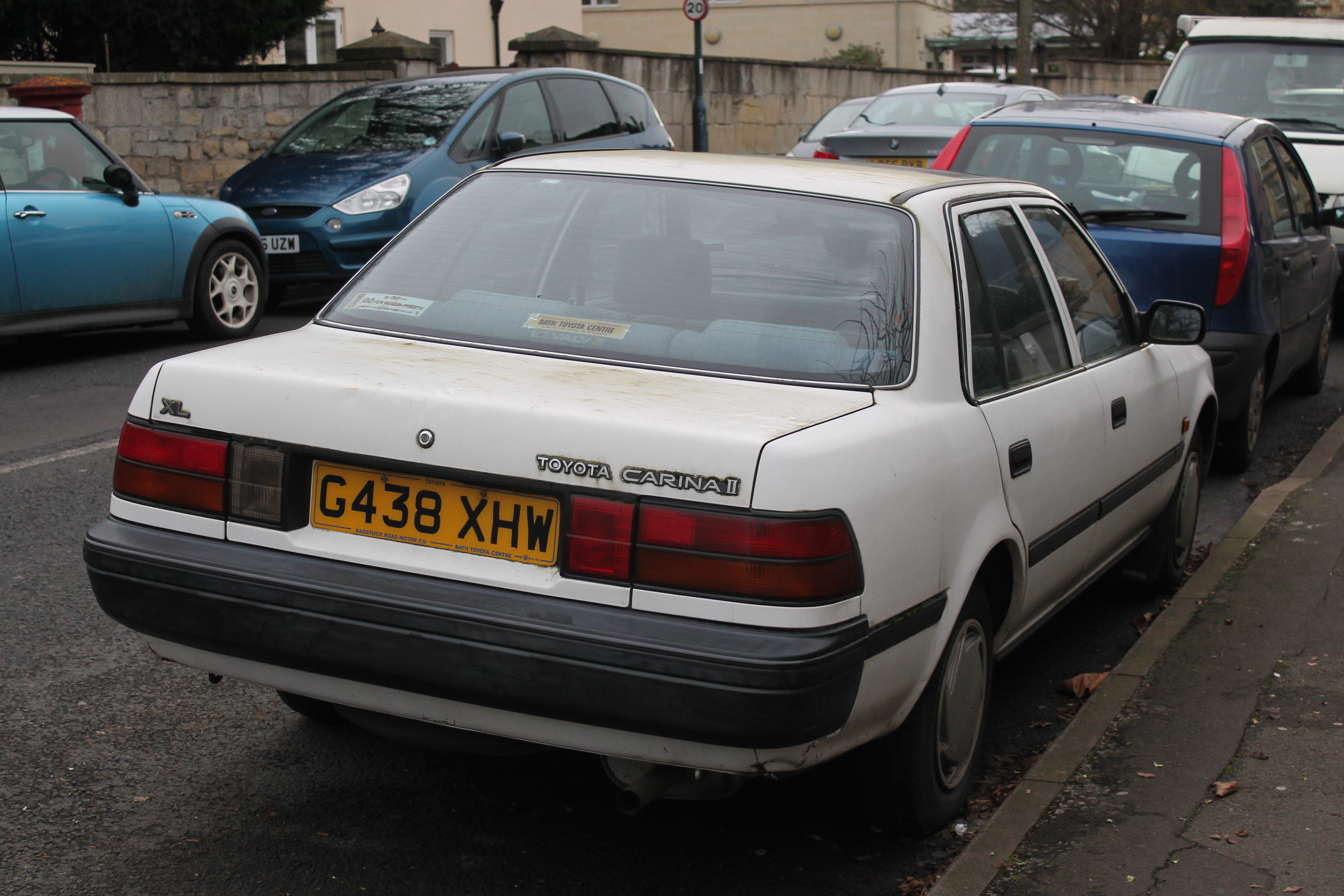
Toyota Carina II 1.6 XL saloon (AT171, Europe)

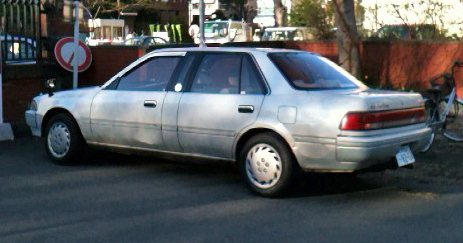
Toyota Corona Super Roomy sedan (ST171, Japan)

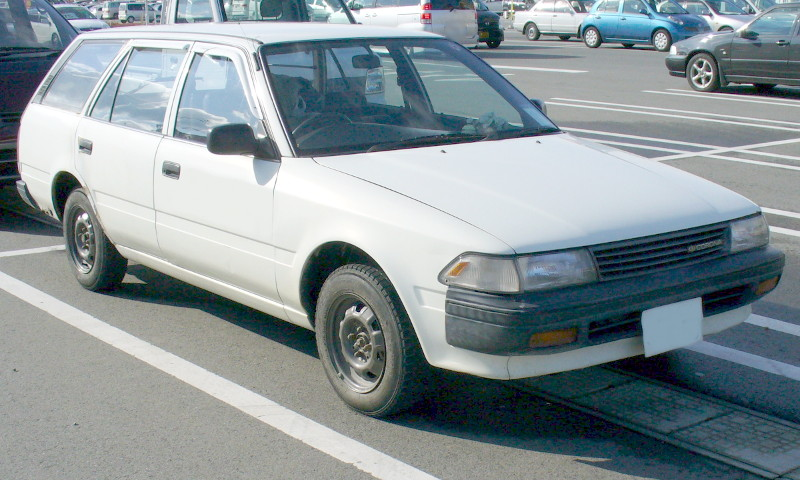
Toyota Corona van (Japan)

=== Corona EXiV (T180) ===
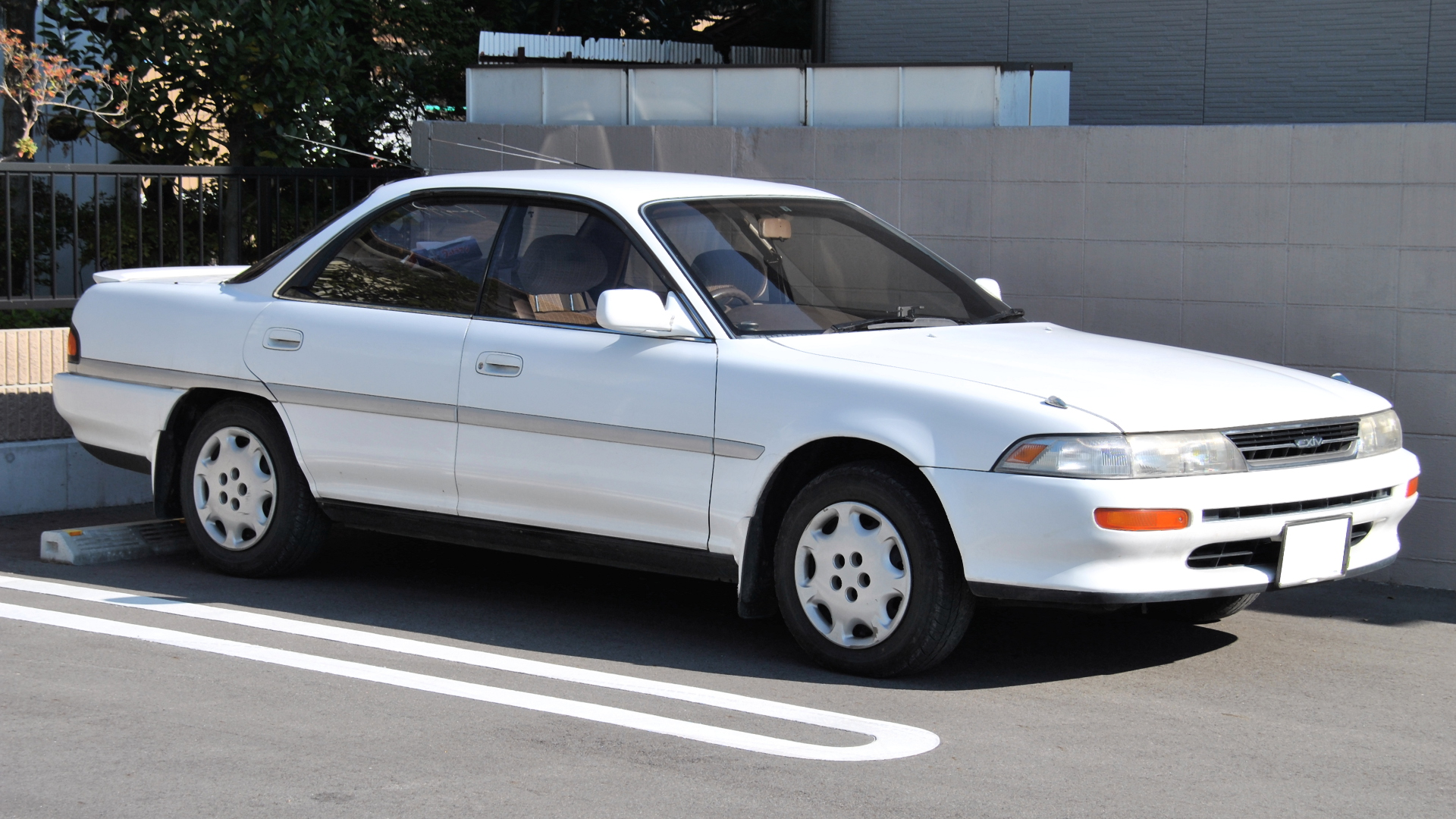
1991 Toyota Corona EXiV 2.0 TR (ST182, Japan)

The T180 series Corona was introduced as the Toyota Corona EXiV which was shared with a Carina twin, called the Toyota Carina ED. According to Toyota, the letters EXiV derived from the words EXtra impressiVe. The Corona EXiV followed from the successes of the Corona Coupé, by introducing a sleek appearance of a low-slung coupé, while adding two more doors, in the tradition of a four-door coupé. Built on the same version of the Corona chassis as that used for the Celica, this was a continuation of the sporting T160 series Corona although it now received its own bodywork.

== Ninth generation (T190; 1992) ==
Ninth generation
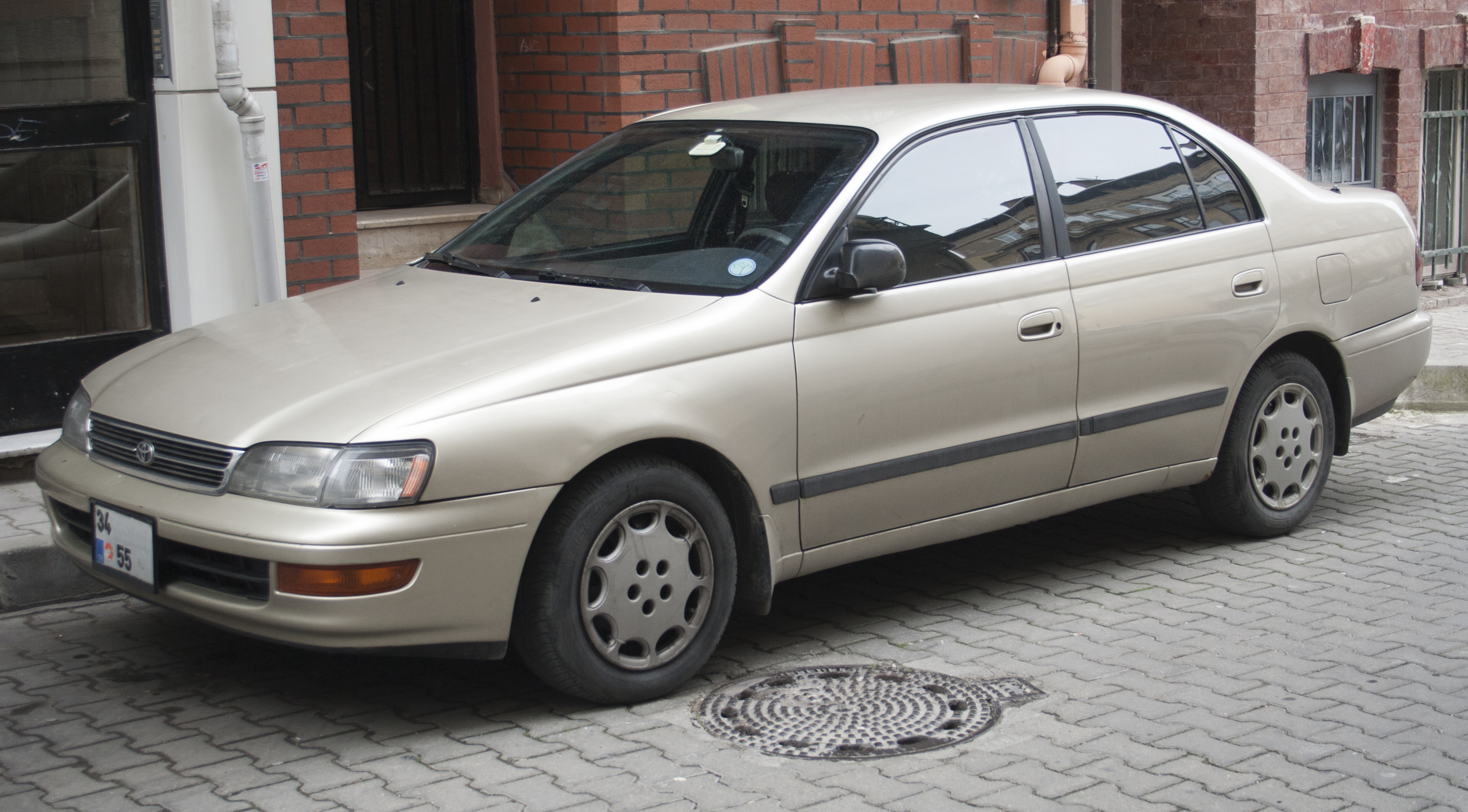
- Pre-facelift Corona 2.0 GLi (ST191, Turkey)

Overview
- Model code: T190
- Also called: Toyota Carina E (Europe); Toyota Caldina (station wagon/van)
- Production: March 1992 – 1996 (Japan); December 1992–1997 (United Kingdom); 1993–1998 (Philippines)
- Assembly: Japan: Toyota, Aichi (Tsutsumi plant); Indonesia: North Jakarta; Thailand: Chachoengsao; New Zealand: Thames; Philippines: Parañaque (1993–1997); Santa Rosa (1997–1998), (TMP); Taiwan: Zhongli; United Kingdom: Burnaston

Body and chassis
- Body style: 4-door sedan; 5-door liftback; 5-door station wagon
- Layout: Front-engine, front-wheel-drive; Front-engine, four-wheel-drive
- Related: Toyota Celica; Toyota Curren; Toyota Carina

Powertrain
- Engine: Petrol: 1.6 L 4A-FE I4 (AT190); 1.8 L 7A-FE I4 (AT191); 1.8 L 4S-FE I4 (ST190); 2.0 L 3S-FE I4 (ST191/195); 2.0 L 3S-GE I4 (ST191; Carina E only); Diesel: 2.0 L 2C-III I4 (CT190/195); 2.0 L 2C-T I4 turbo-diesel (CT190; Carina E only)
- Transmission: 5-speed manual; 4-speed automatic

Dimensions
- Wheelbase: 2,580 mm (101.6 in)
- Length: 4,545 mm (178.9 in) (wagon); 4,520–4,620 mm (178.0–181.9 in)
- Width: 1,695 mm (66.7 in)
- Height: 1,410 mm (55.5 in) (FWD sedan/liftback); 1,425 mm (56.1 in) (AWD sedan); 1,450 mm (57.1 in) (FWD wagon); 1,470 mm (57.9 in) (AWD wagon)
- Curb weight: 1,040–1,310 kg (2,293–2,888 lb)

Introduced in March 1992, the new Corona made its European debut at Geneva Motor Show. In Europe, the Corona was known as the Toyota Carina E and it replaced the Carina II (T170). The Carina E was built at Toyota's new factory at Burnaston, near Derby, England, United Kingdom, but the early cars and all GT-i models were built in Tsutsumi, Japan. For the Japanese domestic market, the Corona's platform twin the Carina received different bodywork.

This generation of Corona received a redesign to be larger, heavier, and have the completely rounded, aerodynamic shape of the 1990s. The exterior dimensions and engine sizes remained in compliance with Japanese size regulations so as to continue to offer a product for Japanese buyers wanting to reduce their annual tax liability.

The five-door model was called the Corona SF in Japan, while the station wagon had become a separate line there, from 1993, called the Toyota Caldina.

The T190 is the last Corona for most export markets. It was marketed as Corona "Absolute" in Indonesia, or Corona Exsior in the Philippines, Taiwan and Thailand.

It was also sold in New Zealand, with "Corona" badging, but not in Australia. The exteriors were the same as the European Carina E. The station wagon variant was a badge-engineered Toyota Caldina and also similar to Carina E. The sedans and liftbacks were assembled in Thames, New Zealand, while the wagon was imported fully built up from Japan. The locally assembled cars also received special spring and damper combinations (again developed by racer Chris Amon) as well as some other changes.

In the Philippines, the Corona was only available with the 2.0-litre 3S-FE engine throughout its production from 1993 to 1998. Early examples of the Corona T190 (ST191) looks similar to the 1992 Japanese spec model. It only has the 2.0 EX Saloon variant, with a choice of a 5-speed manual or a 4-speed automatic transmission. The 1995 model has the facelifted exterior, having the front and rear bumpers with the black trim, and the standard three-piece rear spoiler. The Exsior was introduced in 1996, this time with extended bumpers and red/amber tail lights and garnish. Another variant of the Corona Exsior was the LE, which had genuine leather seats, faux dash wood panel, and electronic air purifier/ionizer as standard equipment.

Production in Japan ended in 1995, but in Europe it lasted until the end of 1997, when it was replaced by the Avensis, which was also built at Burnaston. It lasted until in 1998 for Southeast Asian market and then replaced with the Toyota Camry (XV20).

Corona

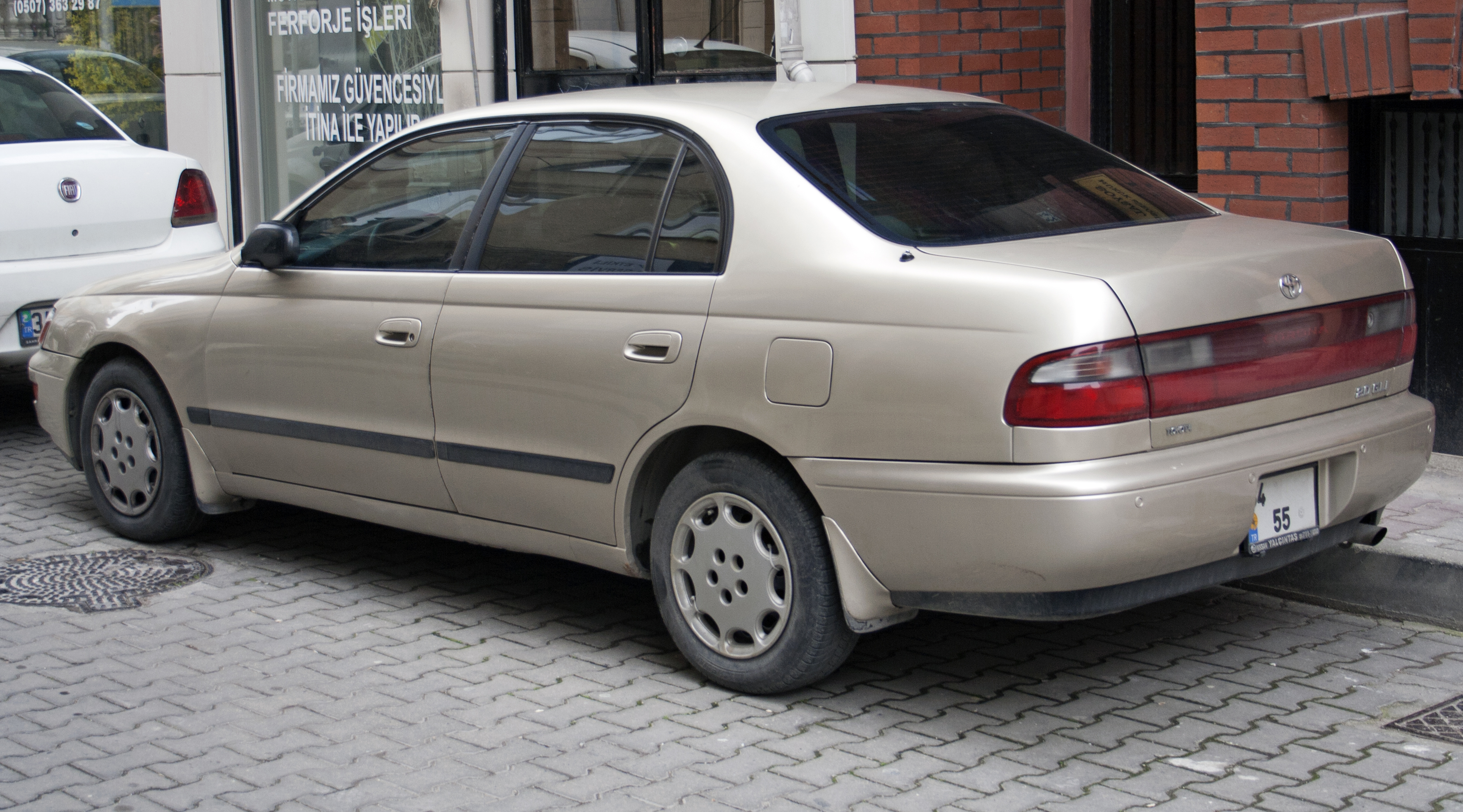
Pre-facelift Corona 2.0 GLi (ST191, Turkey)

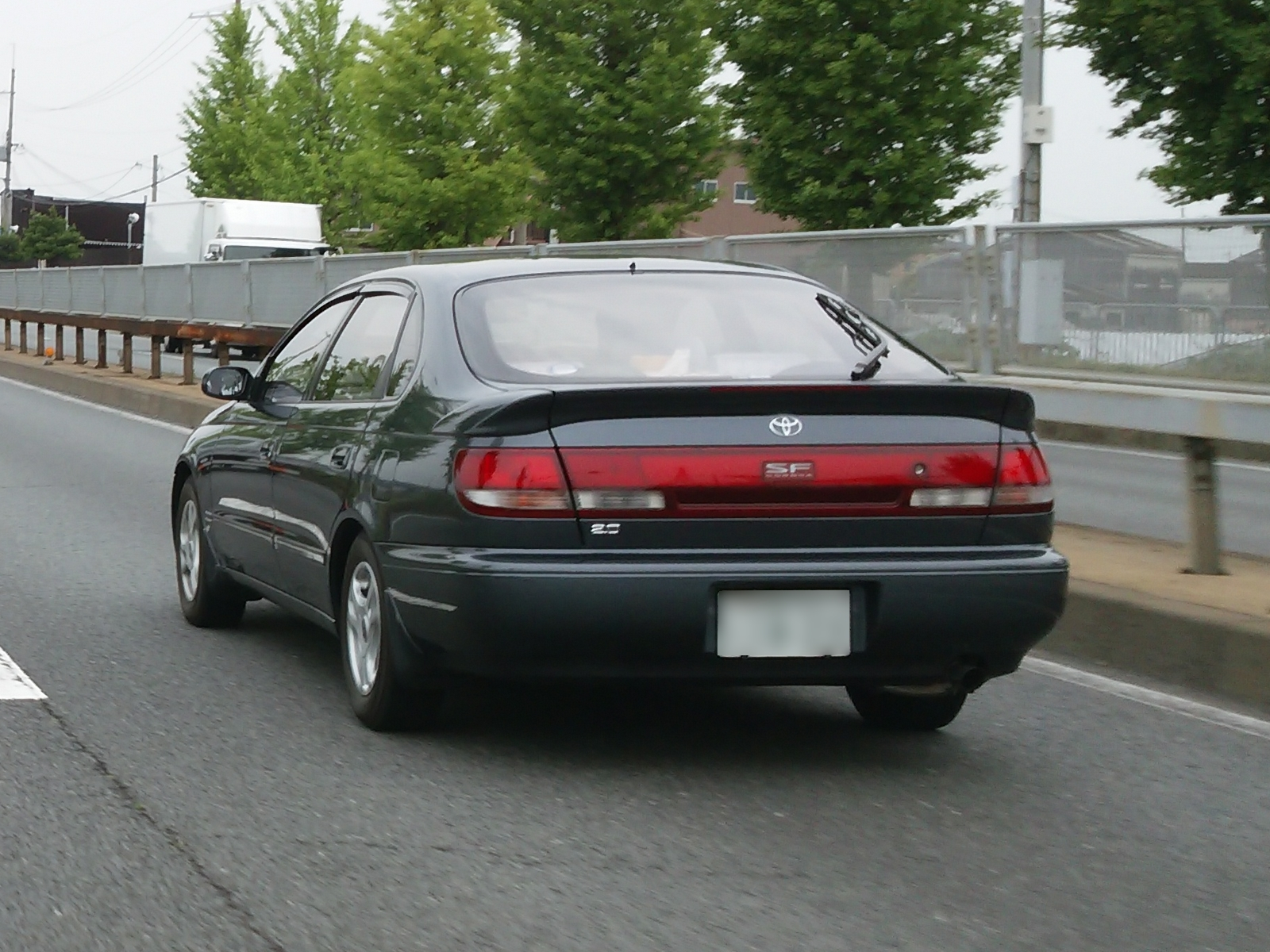
Pre-facelift Corona SF 2.0 Type II (ST191, Japan)

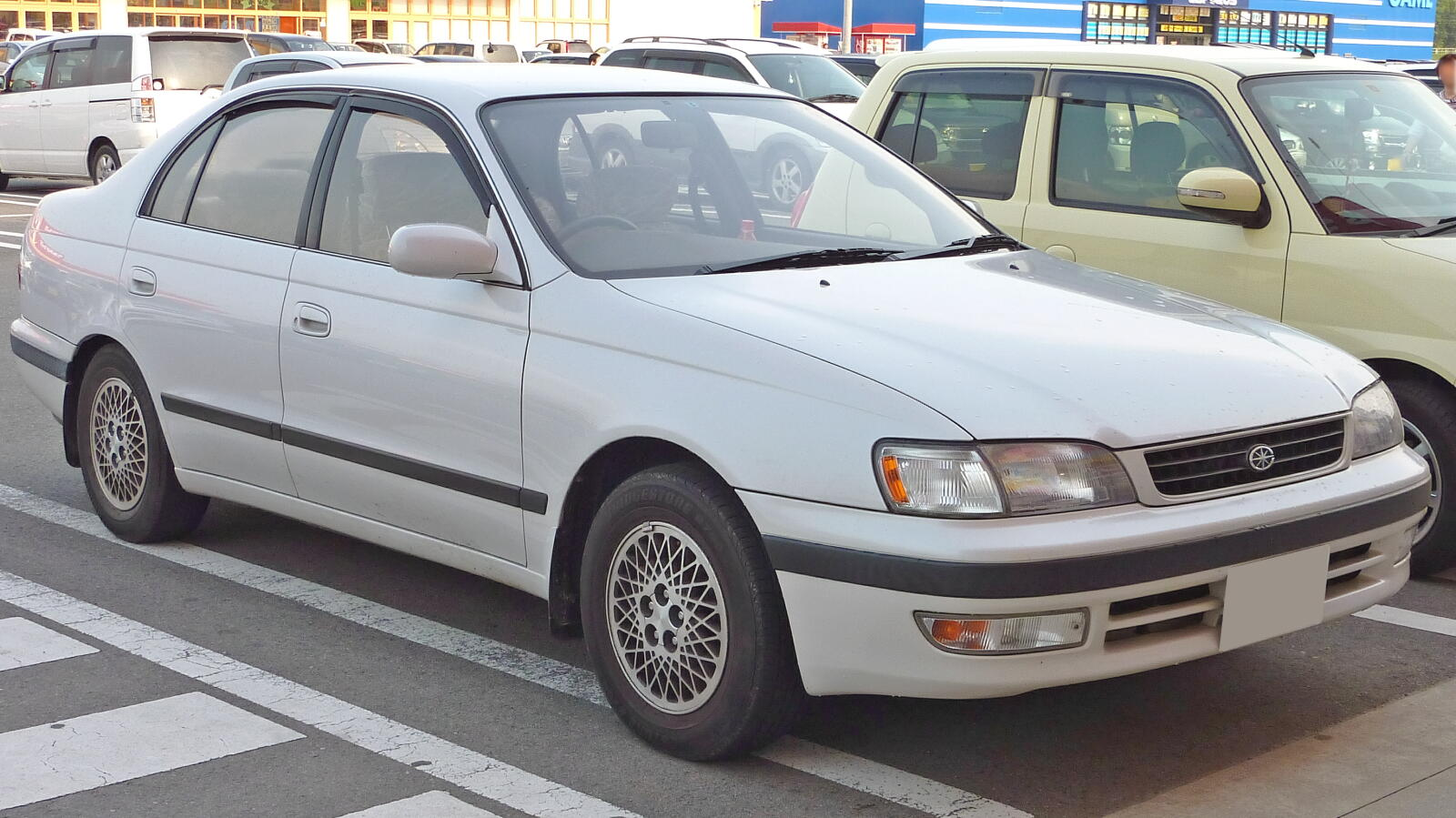
First facelift Corona (Japan)

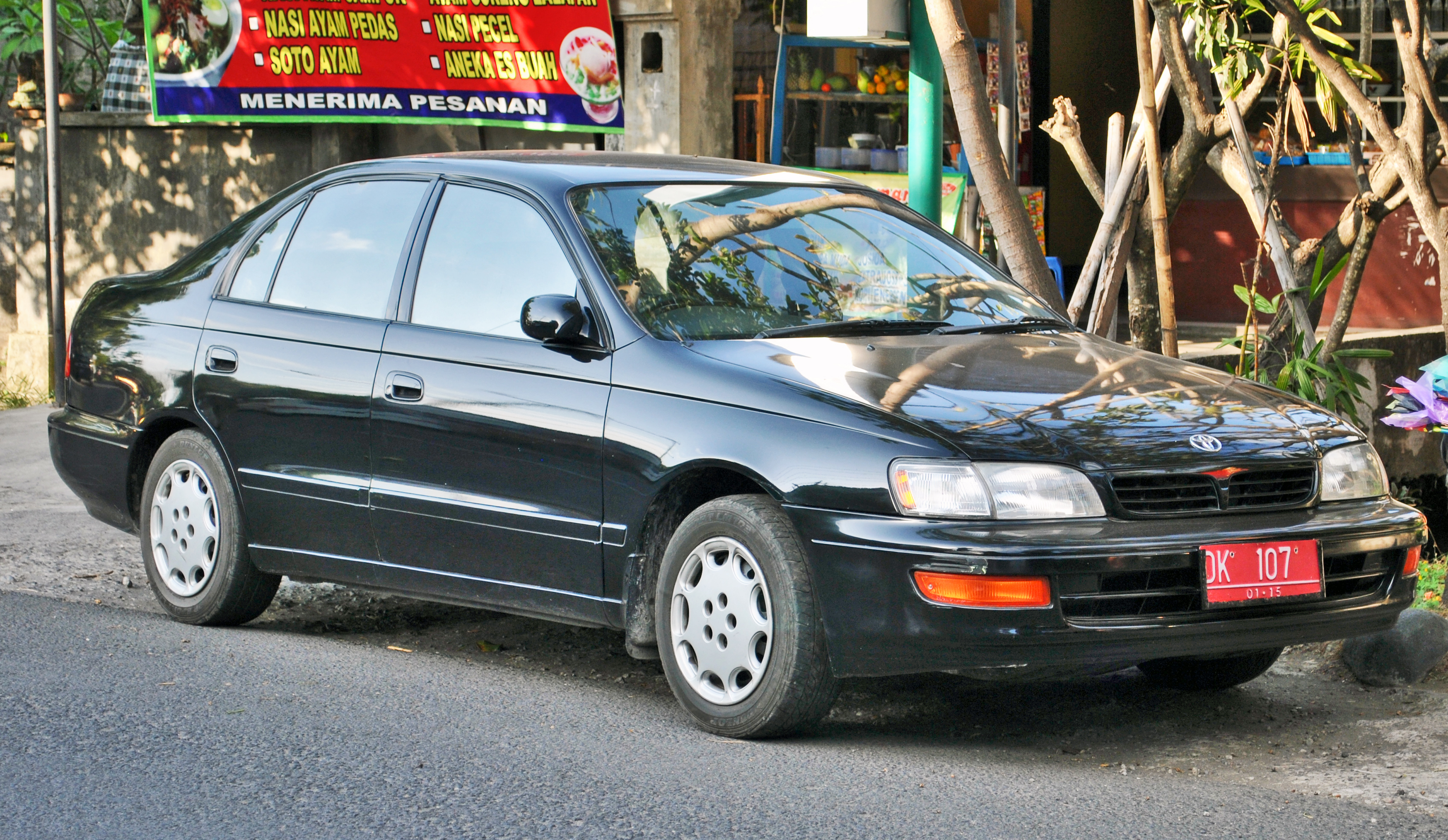
Second facelift Corona "Absolute" 2.0 G (ST191, Indonesia)

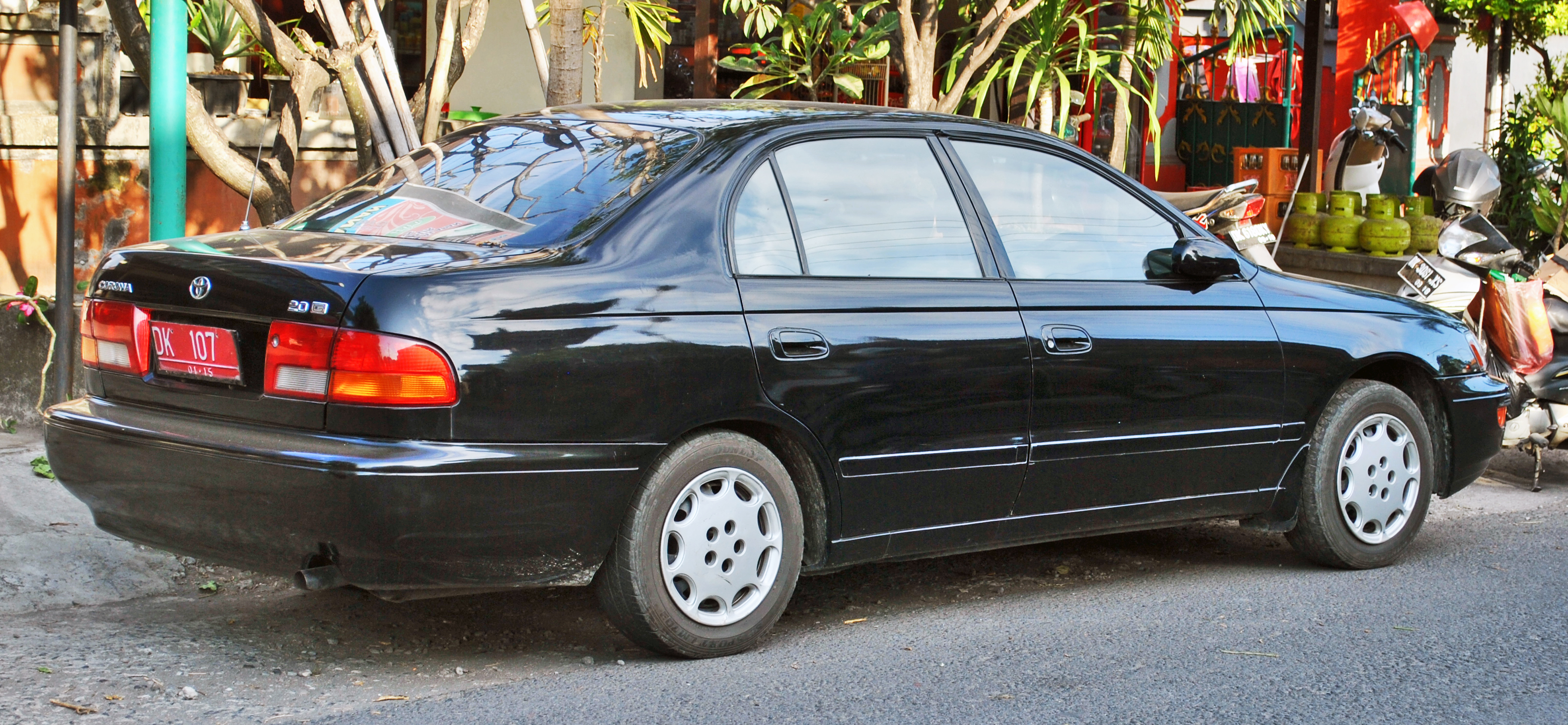
Second facelift Corona "Absolute" 2.0 G (ST191, Indonesia)

=== Caldina (1992) ===
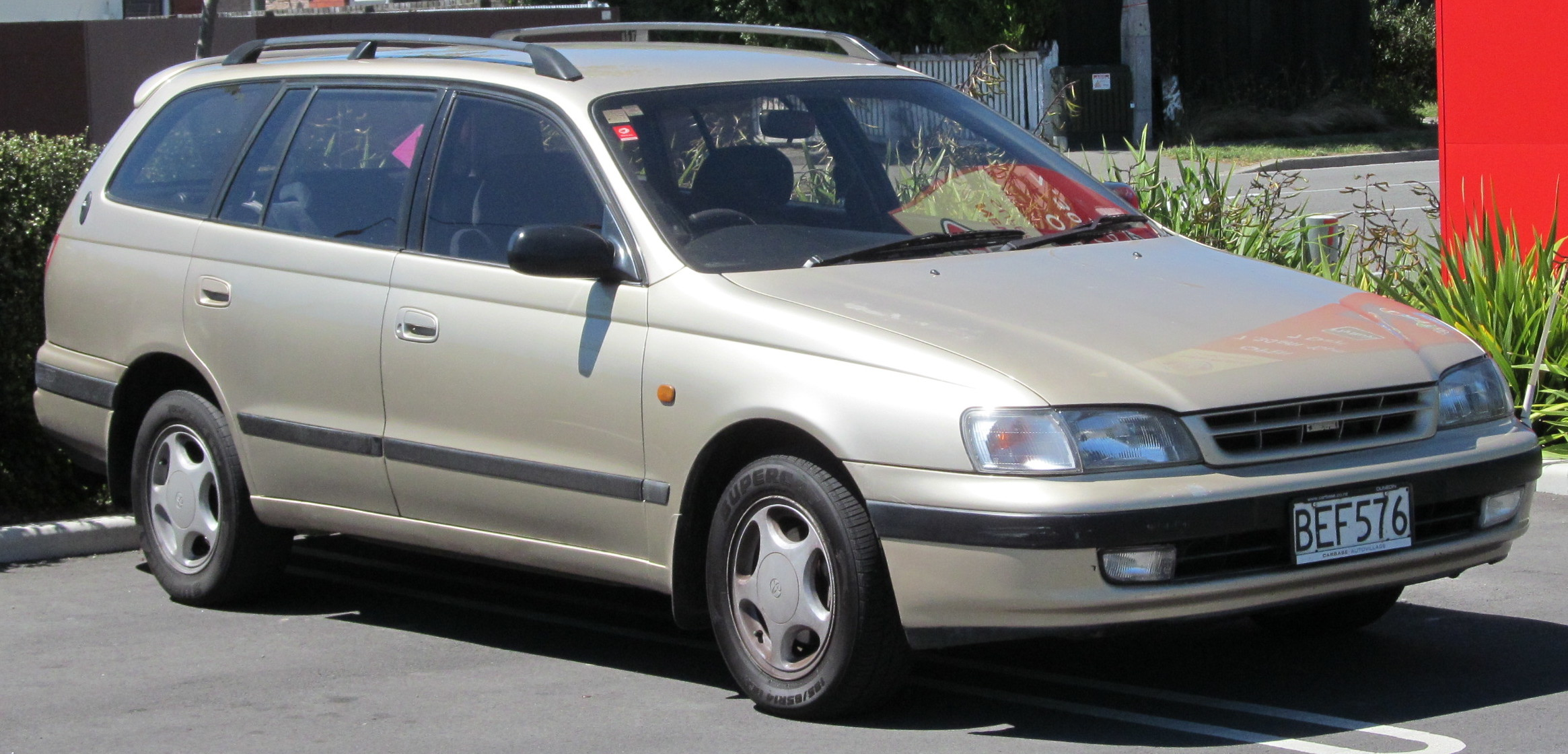
1993 Toyota Caldina Wagon (ST191)

The first Toyota Caldina was the five-door wagon or commercial van version of the four-door sedan Toyota Corona in Japan. The wagon has independent strut rear suspension while the commercial wagon has semi-independent leaf springs. The wagon/van was given its own identity, whereas previous station wagon versions were named Corona. The Caldina was introduced as a successor to the Corona and Carina wagons, and was sold at Toyota Japanese dealerships Toyota Store and Toyopet Store locations. The Caldina was introduced after the Subaru Legacy wagon and the Nissan Avenir wagon.

For the European market, the Caldina was sold as the Carina E wagon. In New Zealand, it was sold as the Corona wagon.

=== Carina E ===
In Europe, the Corona was known as the Toyota Carina E and replaced the Carina II (T170). It was built at Toyota's new factory at Burnaston, near Derby, England, United Kingdom, but early cars and all GT-i models were built in Tsutsumi, Japan. The cars were imported in Europe from the third quarter of 1992 until the opening of the Burnaston factory in December that year.

In mainland Europe, the Carina E was offered in XL and GL trim levels, but in the UK they were marketed as Xi (1.6-litre), XLi (1.6, 1.8-litre), SLi (1.8-litre), GLi (1.6, 1.8, 2.0-litre), GTi (2.0-litre, no estate) and Executive (2.0-litre, no estate) between 1992 and 1996. Diesels were available as the 2.0-litre XLD and GLD trims. From 1996, the S (1.6-litre, hatchback only), GS (1.6, 1.8-litre), CD (1.6, 1.8, 2.0-litre), and CDX (1.8, 2.0-litre) trims replaced the previous trim level scheme. Diesels were now the 2.0-litre GS and GL trims. The high performance GT-i with 3S-GE engine was offered in small numbers in certain European countries. All versions (apart from the four-door only GTi and Executive) were available as a four-door saloon, five-door hatchback, or five-door estate car. Badged as a Carina, this was the 1993 Semperit Irish Car of the Year.

Carina E

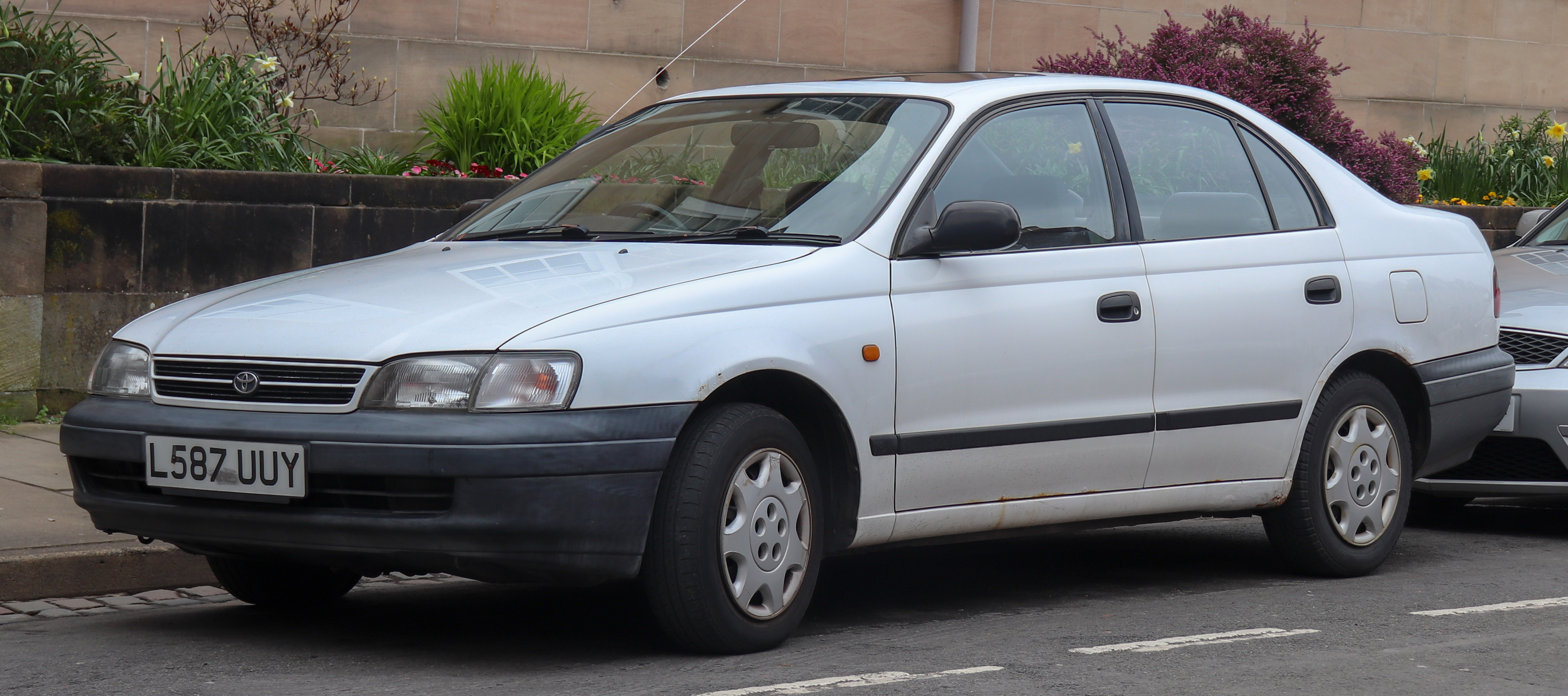
Pre-facelift Carina E 2.0D XL saloon (CT190, UK)

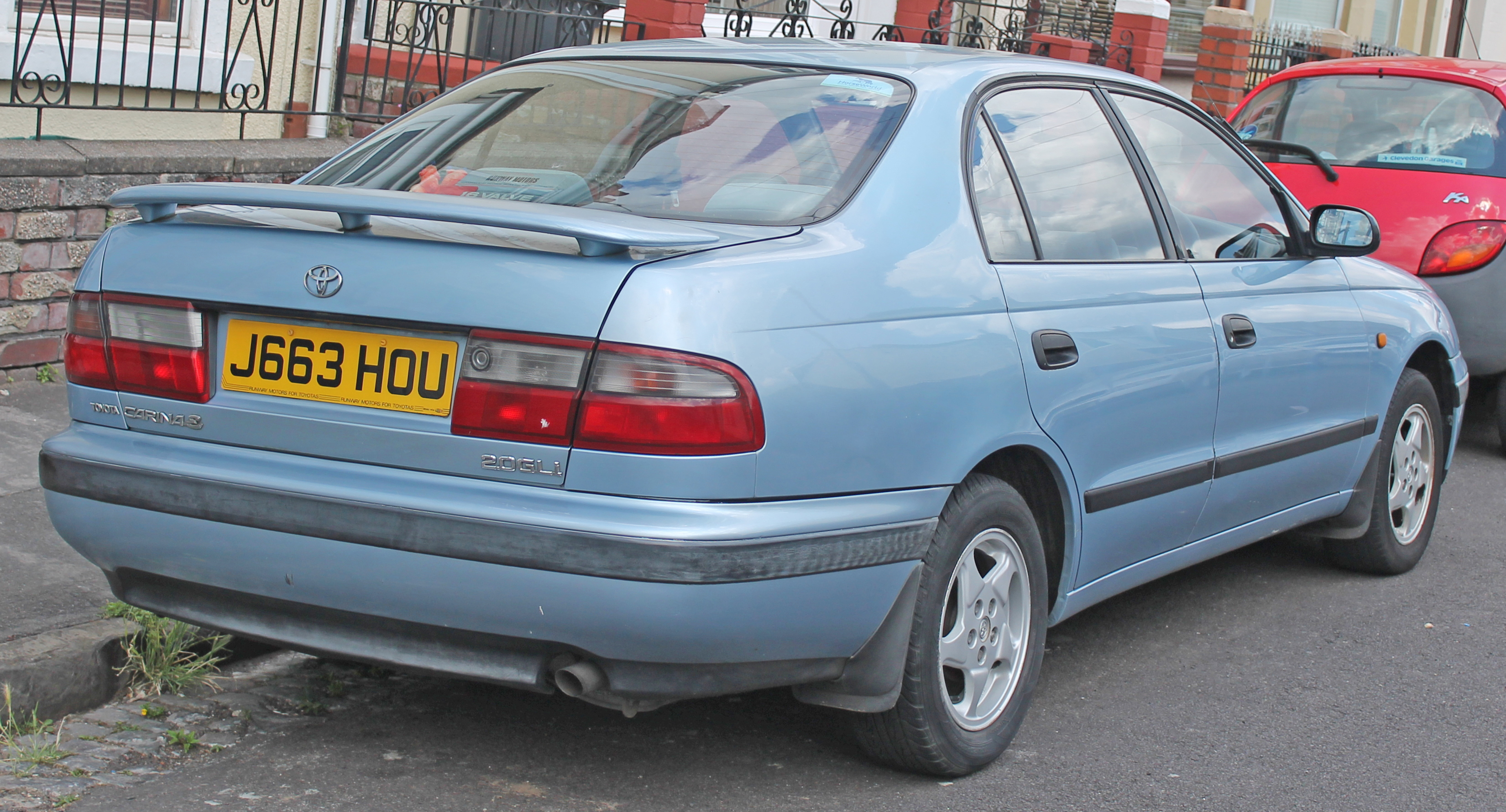
Pre-facelift Carina E 2.0 GLi saloon (ST191, UK)

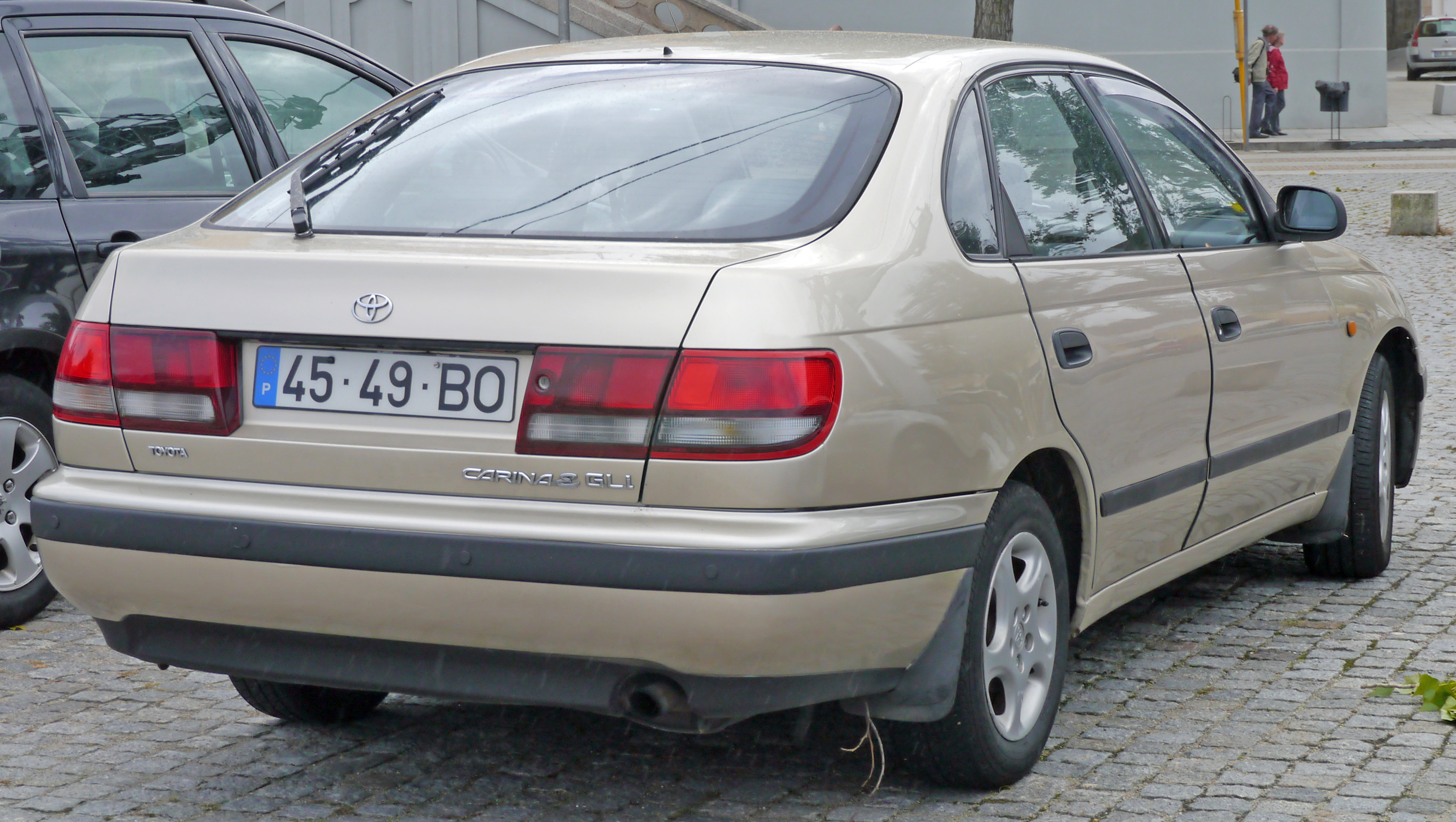
Pre-facelift Carina E GLi liftback (Europe)

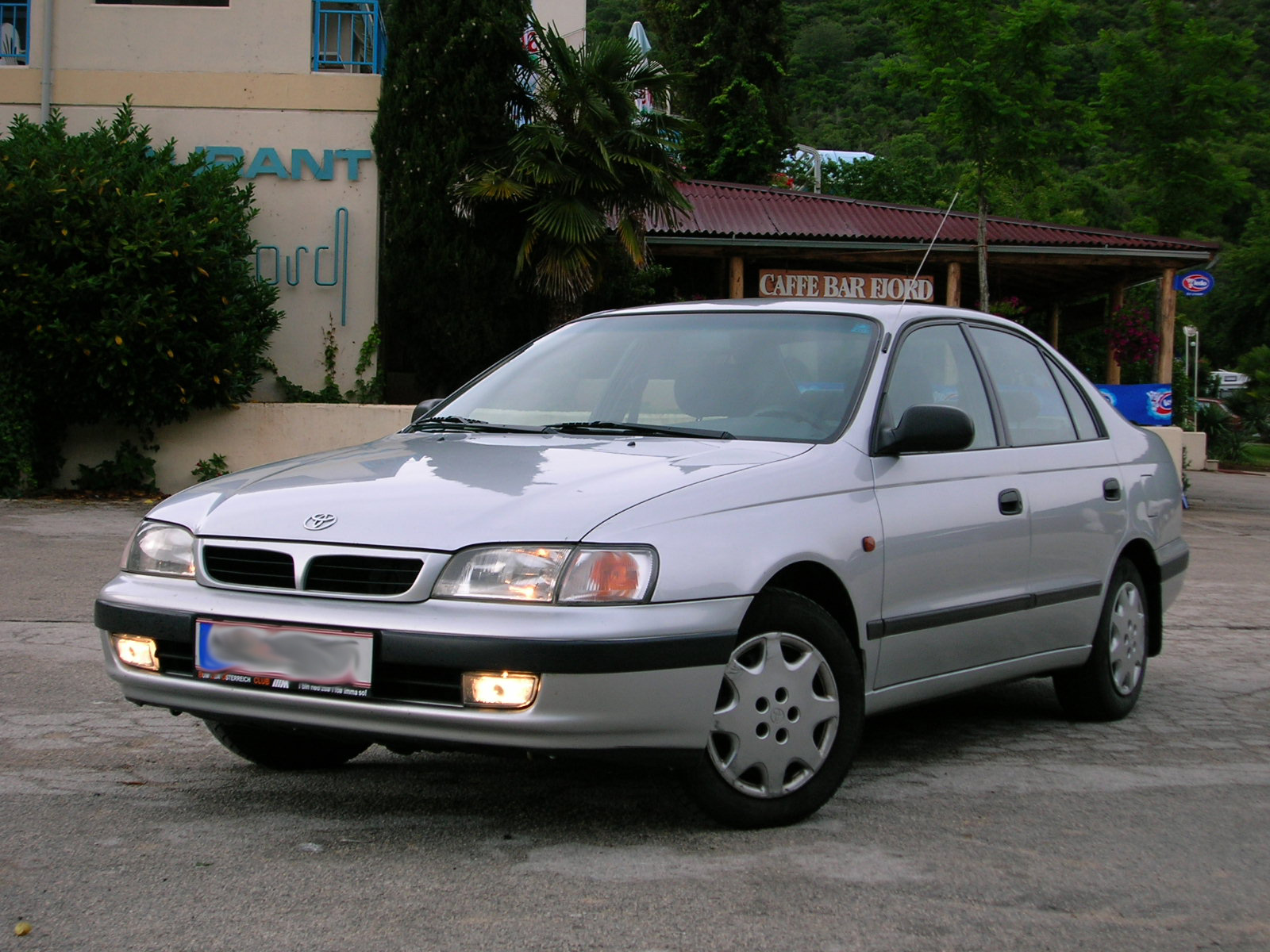
Facelift Carina E saloon (Europe)

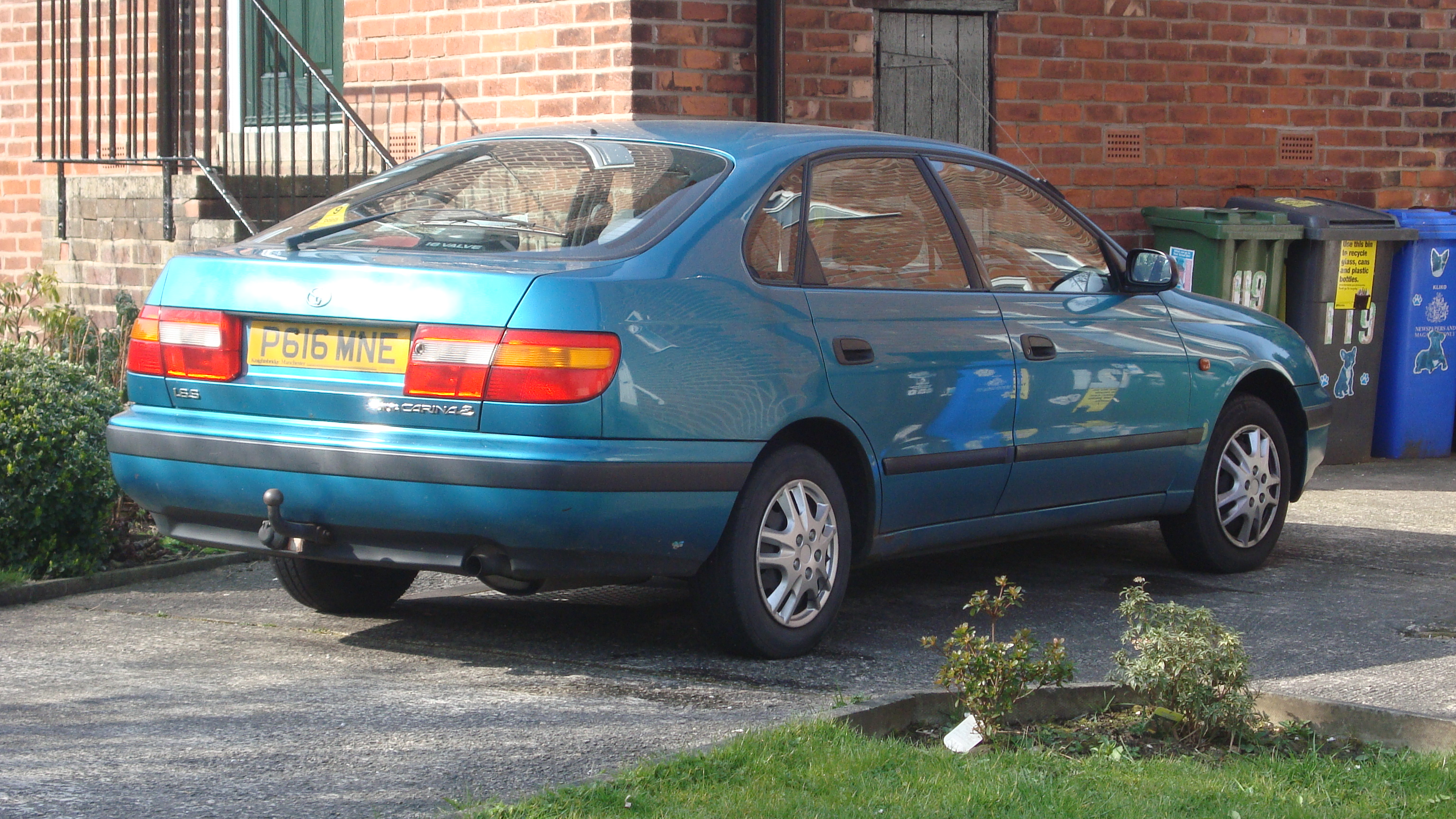
Facelift Carina E 1.6 S Liftback (AT190, UK)

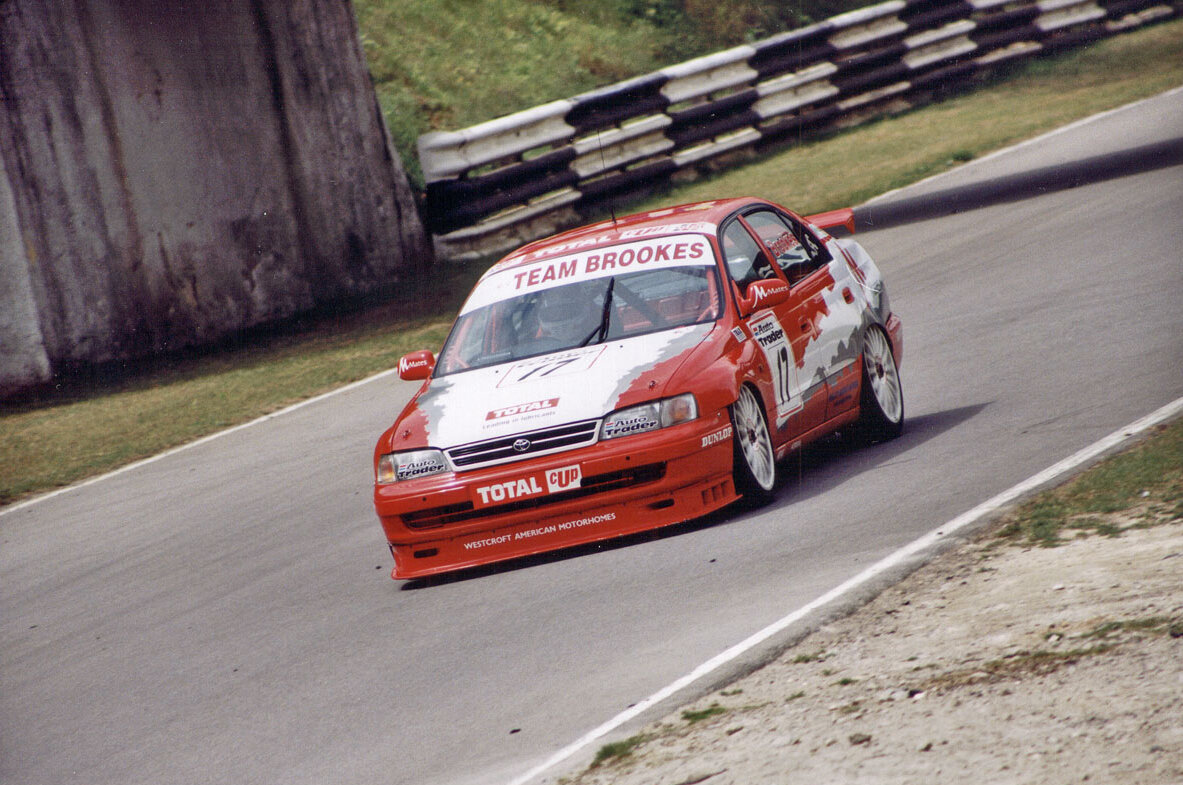
BTCC Carina E 2.0 (ST191) built to Super Touring Car regulations.

=== Corona EXiV (T200) ===
The T200 series Corona was sold as the continuation of the Toyota Corona EXiV hardtop sedan, while the Corona Coupé's successor was relocated to Toyota Vista Store locations and reintroduced as the Toyota Curren. The EXiV was available with three different engines, all multiple-point fuel injected 16-valve twin cam inline-fours: the 1838 cc 4S-FE and the 1998 cc 3S-FE or 3S-GE. Power outputs are 125 PS (92 kW), 140 PS (103 kW), and 180 PS (132 kW) respectively. The 3S-GE benefitted from a higher state of tuning, a forged crankshaft, and a variable-length intake manifold system (called ACIS by Toyota). The 3S-engined cars carry the ST202 chassis code, while the 1.8-litre, 4S-engined ones are called ST200.

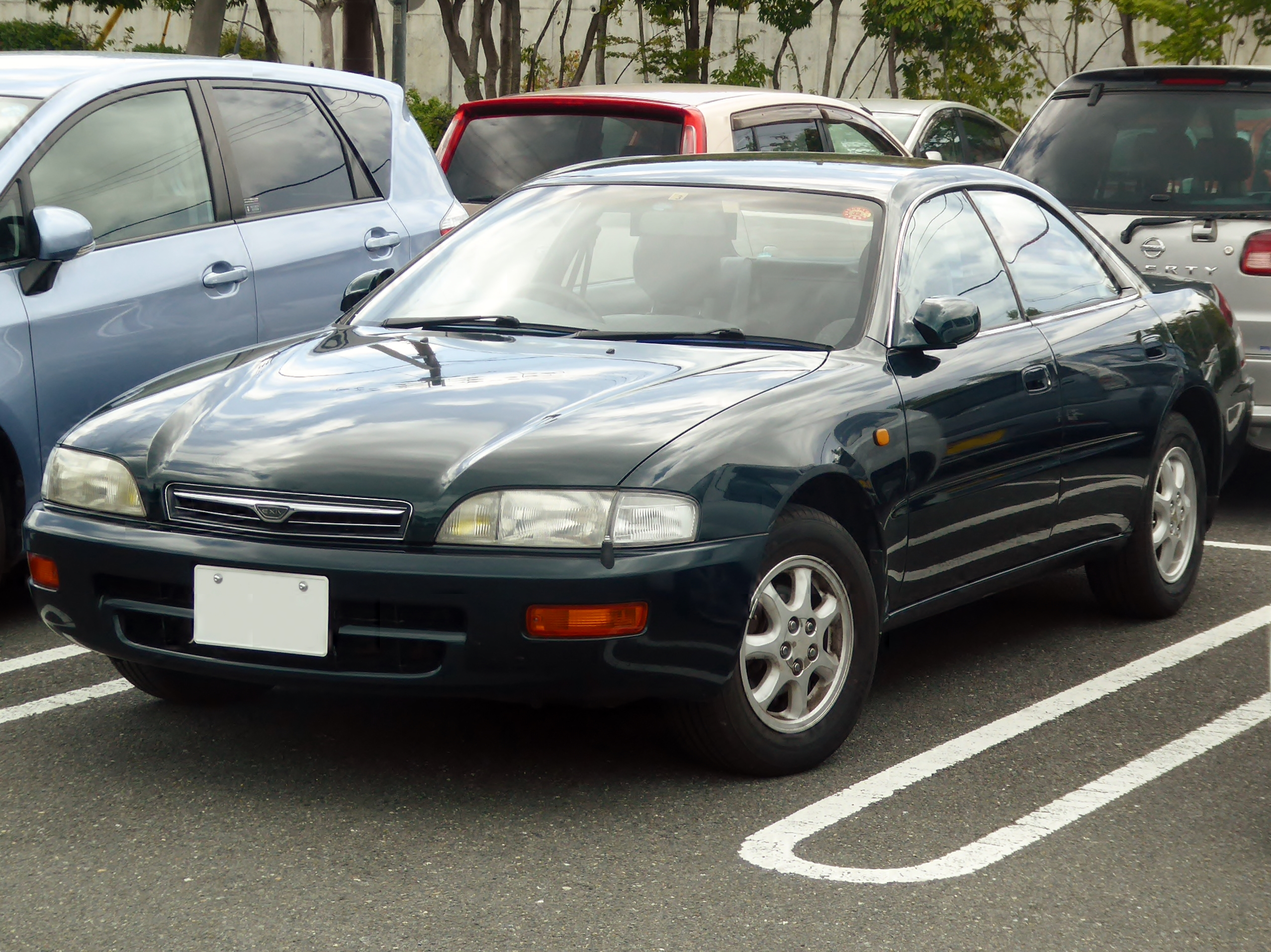
Pre-facelift Corona EXiV 2.0 TR-X (ST202)

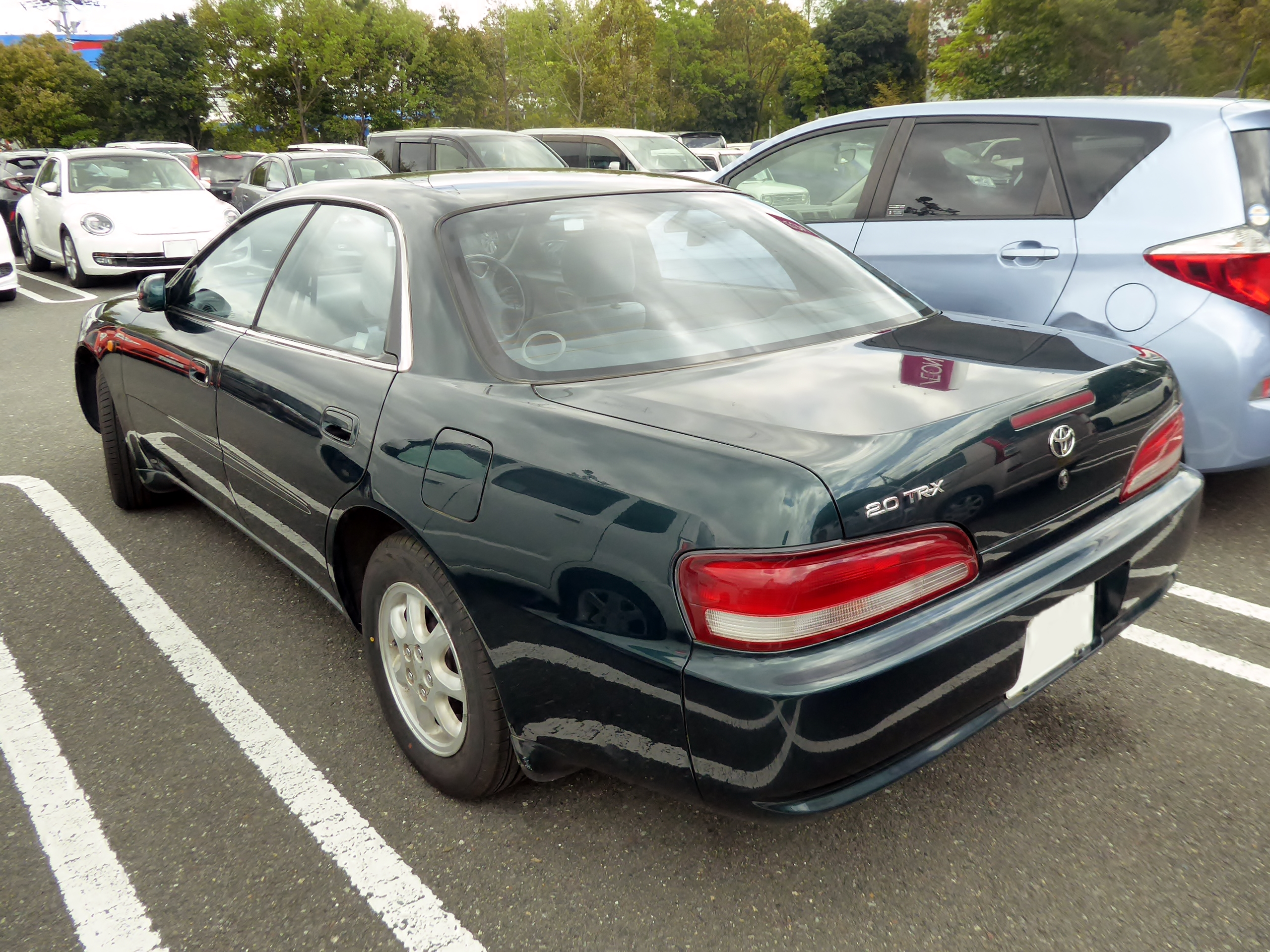
Pre-facelift Corona EXiV 2.0 TR-X (ST202)

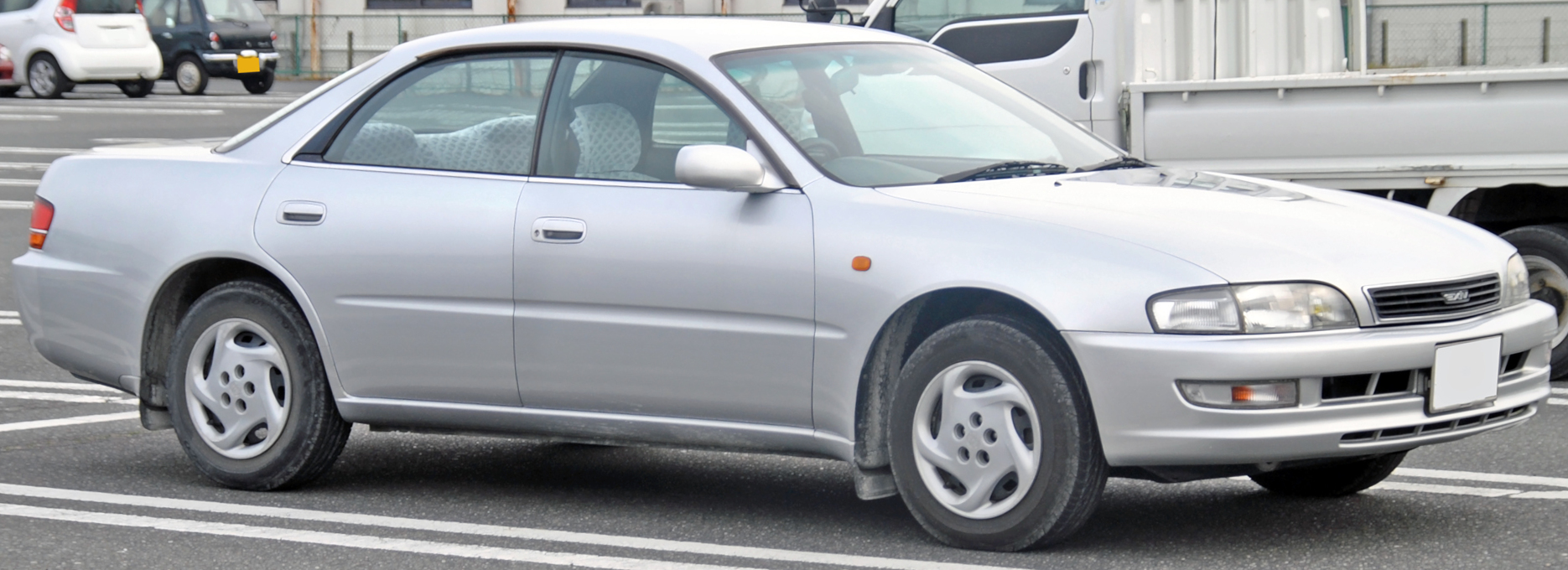
Facelift Corona EXiV

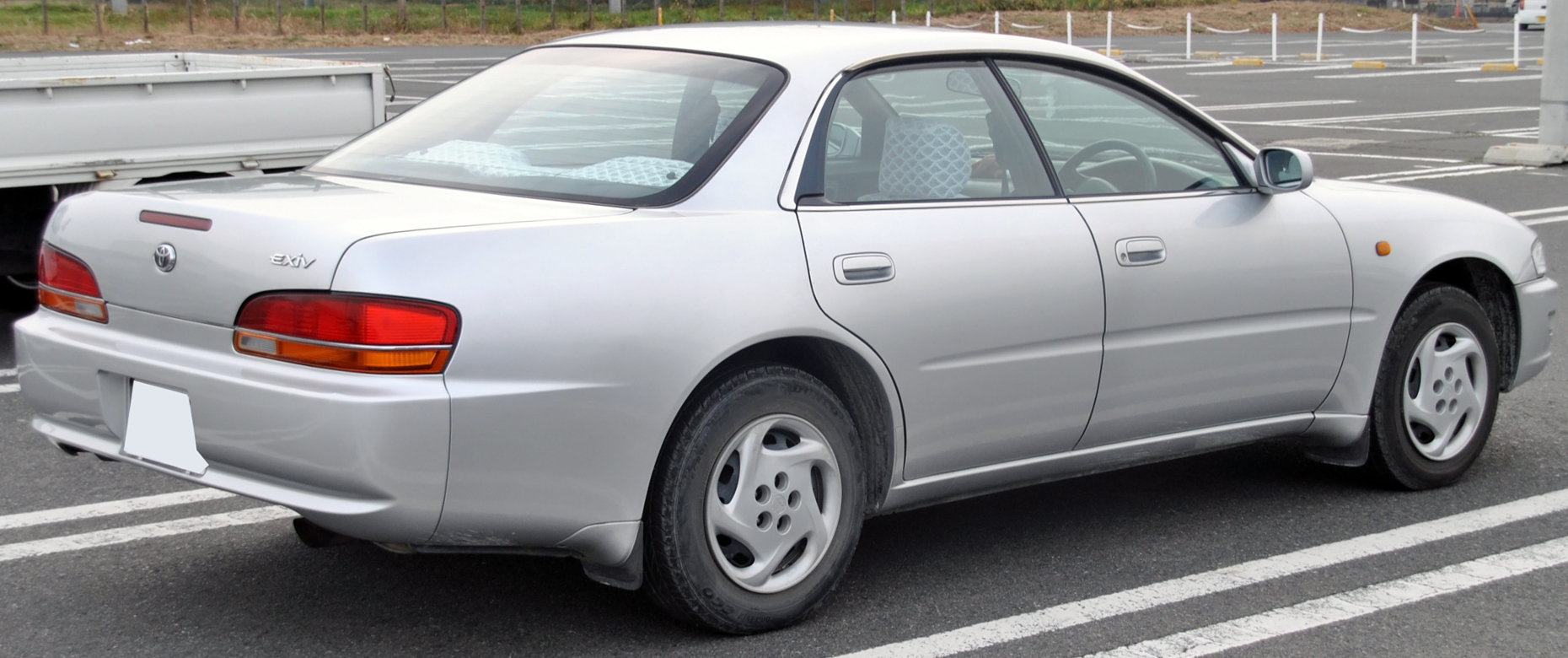
Facelift Corona EXiV

== Tenth generation ==
=== Corona Premio (T210; 1996) ===
Tenth generation
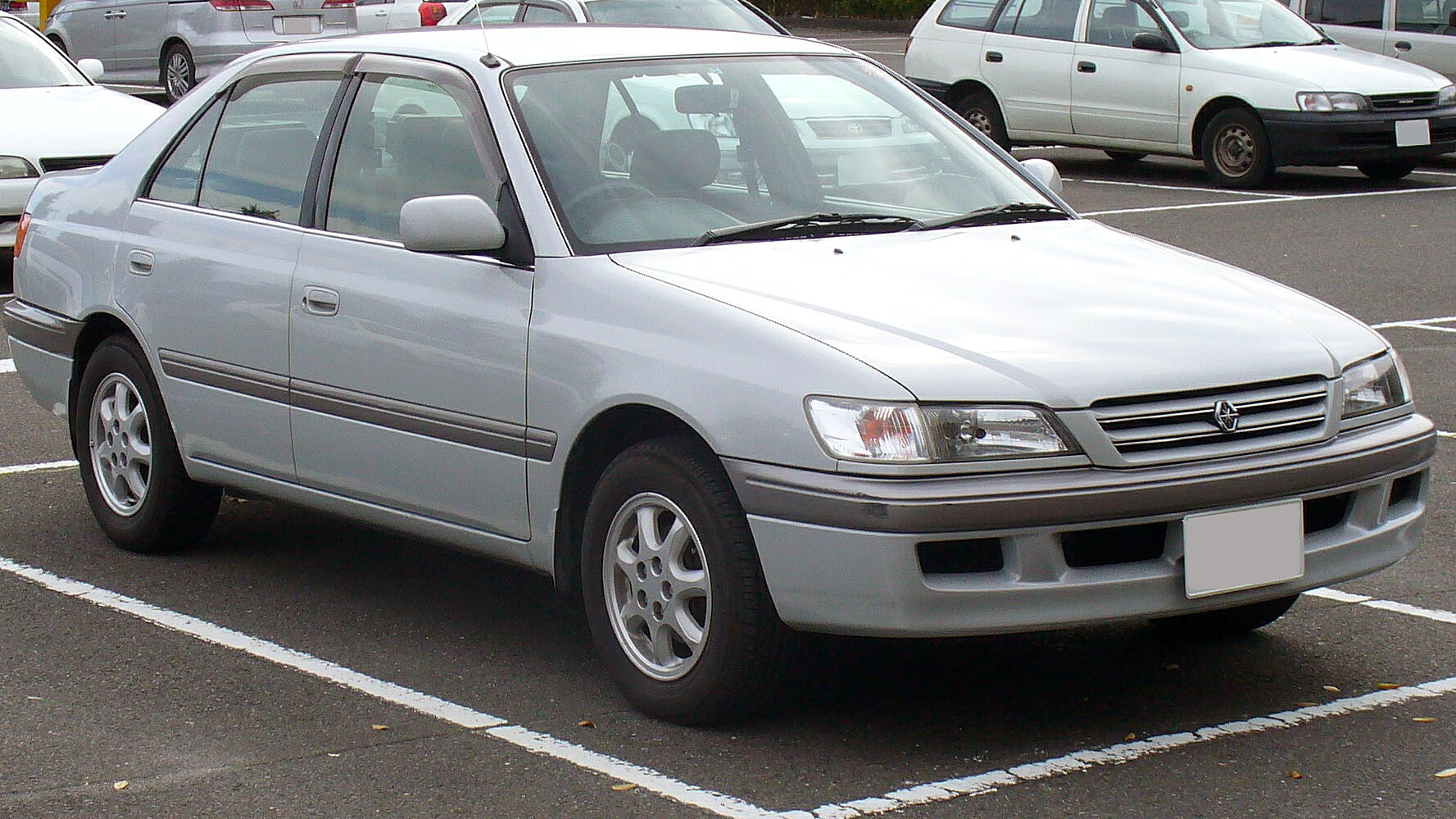
- Pre-facelift Toyota Corona Premio (Japan)

Overview
- Model code: T210
- Production: January 1996 – December 2001
- Assembly: Japan: Toyota, Aichi (Tsutsumi plant); Taiwan: Zhongli

Body and chassis
- Body style: 4-door sedan
- Layout: Front-engine, front-wheel drive / Four-wheel drive
- Related: Toyota Avensis (T220); Toyota Avensis Picnic/Ipsum/Picnic/SportsVan (XM10); Toyota Caldina (T210); Toyota Carina (T210); Toyota Celica (T200)

Powertrain
- Engine: 1.6 L 4A-FE I4; 1.8 L 7A-FE I4; 2.0 L 3S-FE I4; 2.0 L 3S-FSE I4 (D-4 direct injection); 2.0 L 3S-GE I4; 2.0 L 3S-GTE I4 (turbo); 2.0 L 2C-T I4 diesel (until 1998); 2.2 L 3C-T I4 diesel (1998 on)

Dimensions
- Wheelbase: 2,580 mm (101.6 in)
- Length: 4,520 mm (178.0 in)
- Width: 1,695 mm (66.7 in)
- Height: 1,410 mm (55.5 in)
- Curb weight: 1,190 kg (2,623.5 lb)

A final, tenth generation was built between January 1996 and December 2001 for the Japanese market. It was marketed as the Toyota Corona Premio, which became a separate model called the Premio in 2001 (coded ST210), with the Allion following the Carina after 2001. The Corona Premio was offered in Base Premio, Premio E, and Premio G grades. Four-cylinder petrol engine choices included the 1.6-litre 4A-FE, 1.8-litre lean burn 7A-FE, and 2.0-litre 3S-FE and direct-injection 3S-FSE (D-4). Diesel engines included the 2.0-litre 2C-T and later the 2.2-litre 3C-T. Selected versions were also available with full-time four-wheel drive (4WD). A facelift featuring revised exterior and interior styling was introduced in December 1997. This was the last model to use the Corona name in Japan. Automatic versions featured selectable modes for their electronically controlled transmissions: Normal, ECT PWR (power mode), and ECT MANU (manual/snow mode).

The tenth-generation Corona was also officially exported to Singapore and Hong Kong, where it was sold simply as the 'Corona' without the 'Premio' nameplate. It was only offered in the GLi trim with either a 1.6-litre 4A-FE or 2.0-litre 3S-FE engine. The GLi lacked the ECT MANU mode. Following the expiration of their statutory lifespans in Singapore, many of these units were subsequently exported as second-hand vehicles to Batam, Indonesia.

Taiwanese-built Corona Premios received a slightly more ornate grille and larger taillights than its Japanese counterpart.

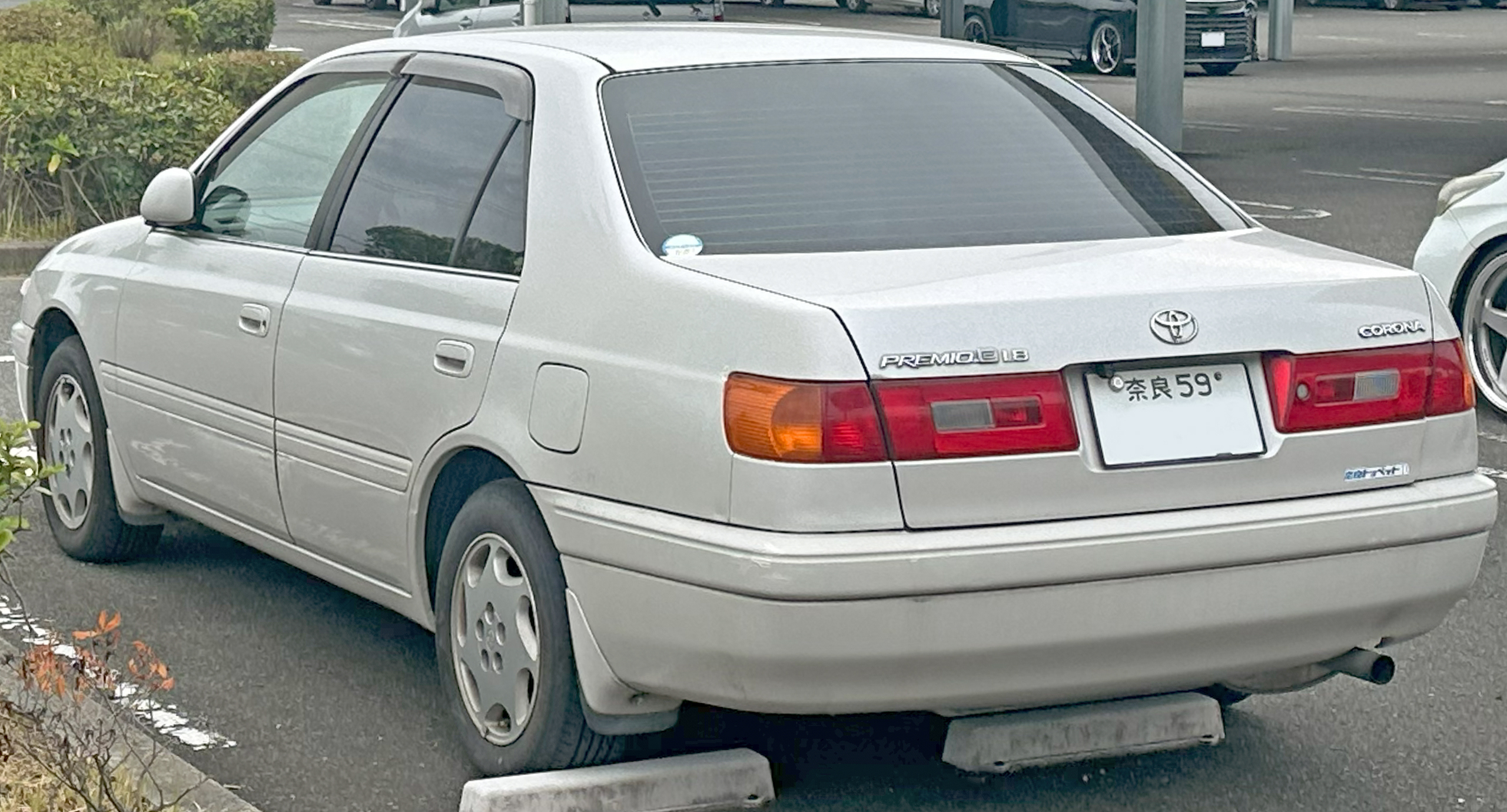
Pre-facelift Corona Premio E (Japan)

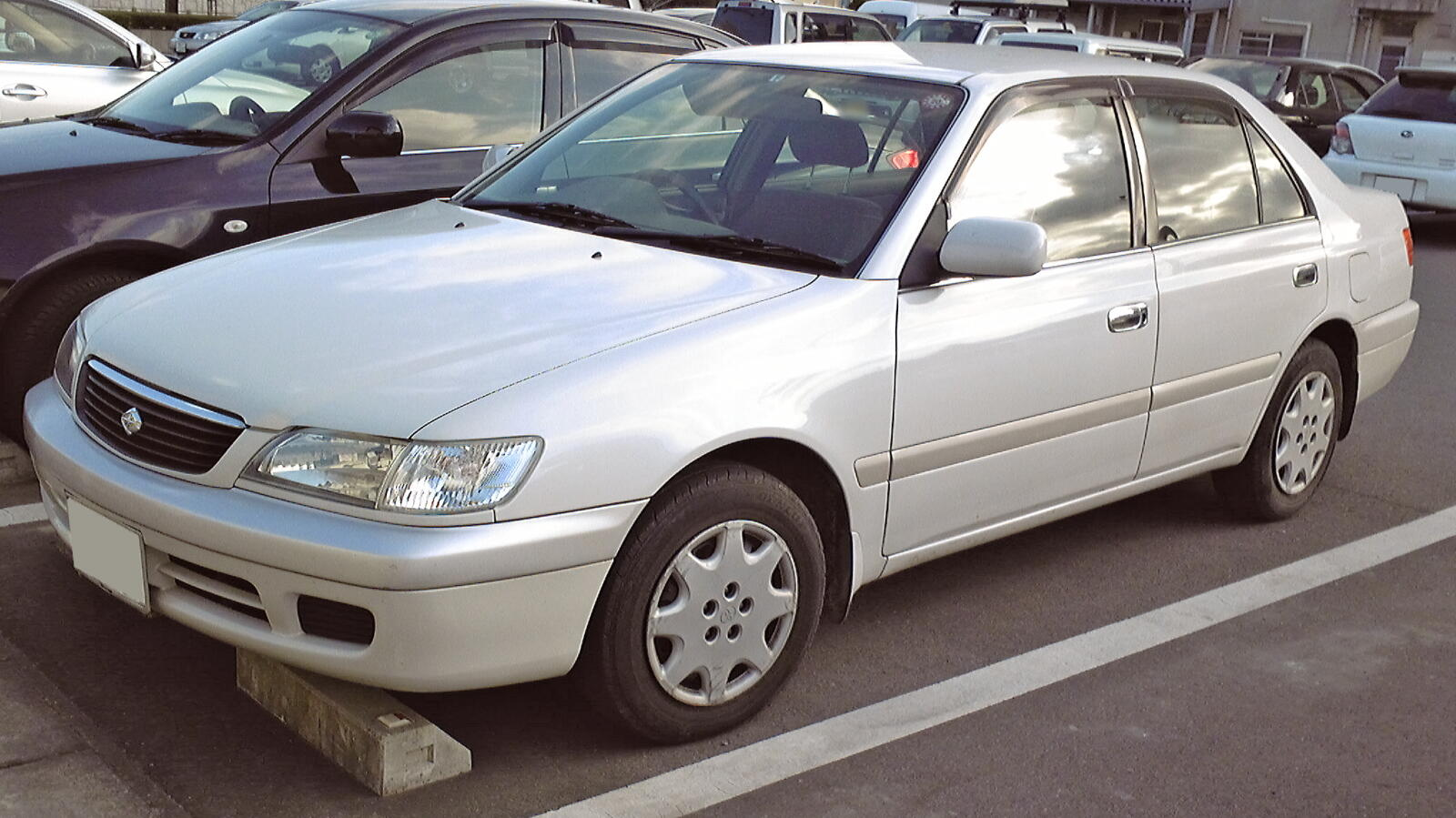
Facelift Corona Premio E (Japan)

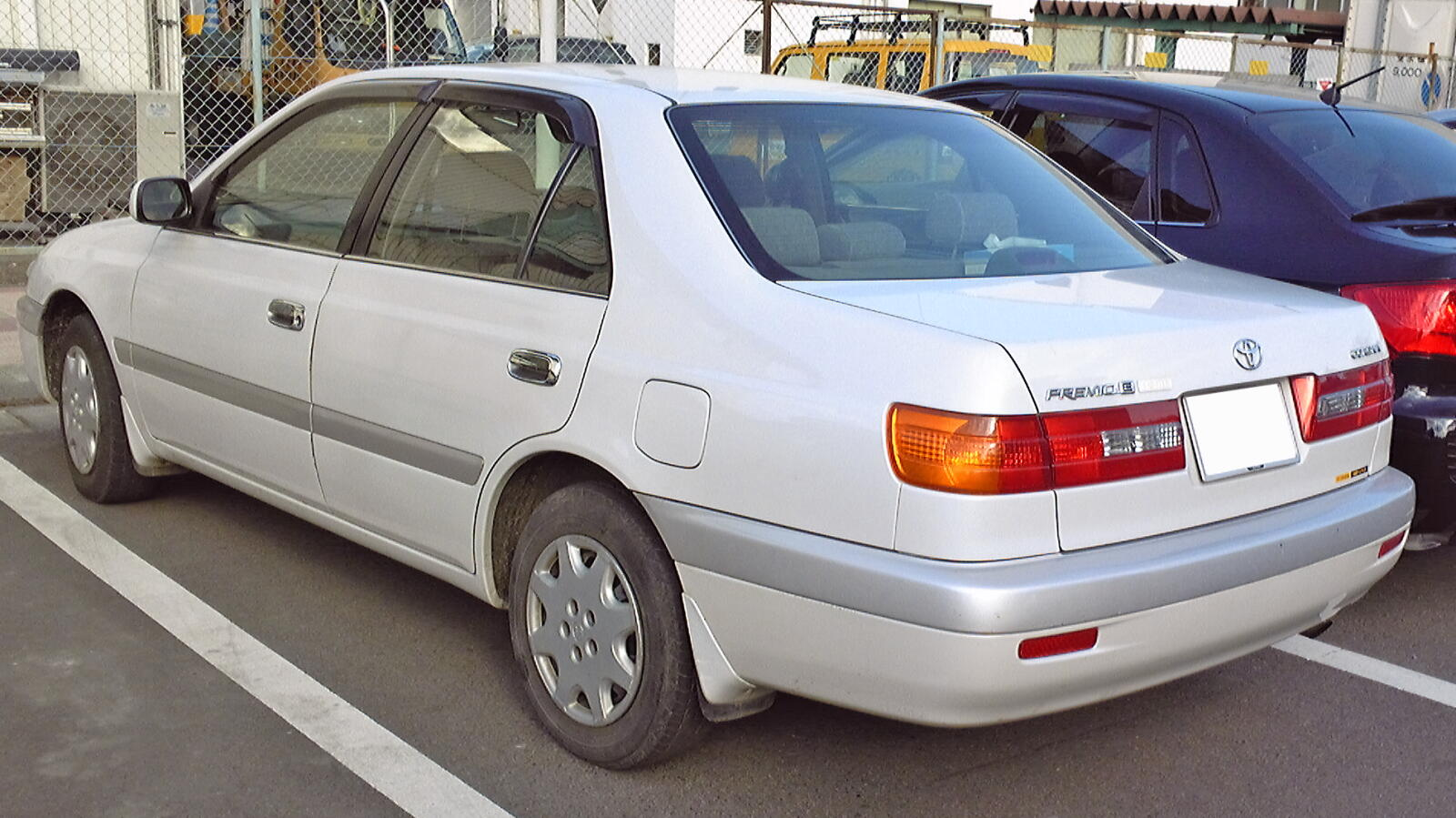
Facelift Corona Premio E (Japan)

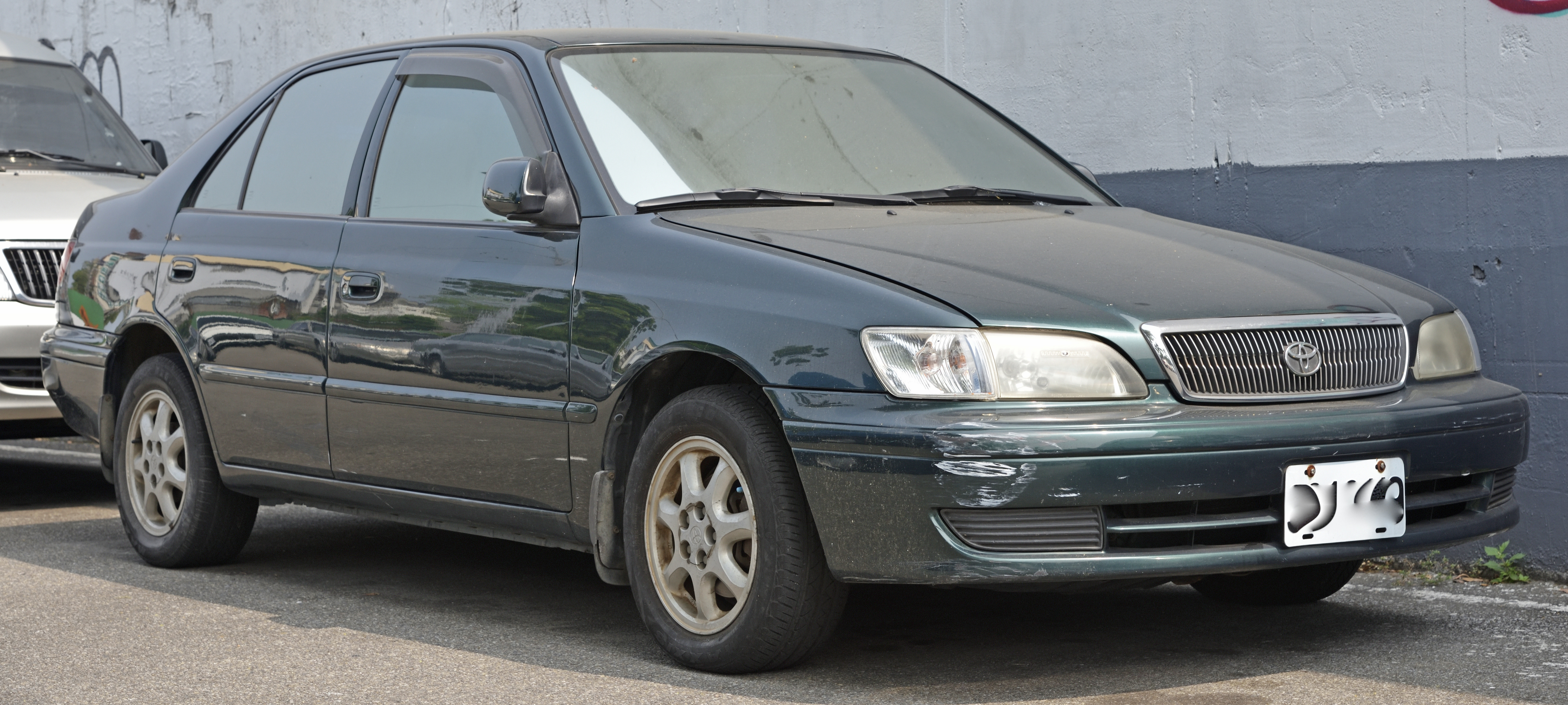
Facelift Corona Premio E (Taiwan)

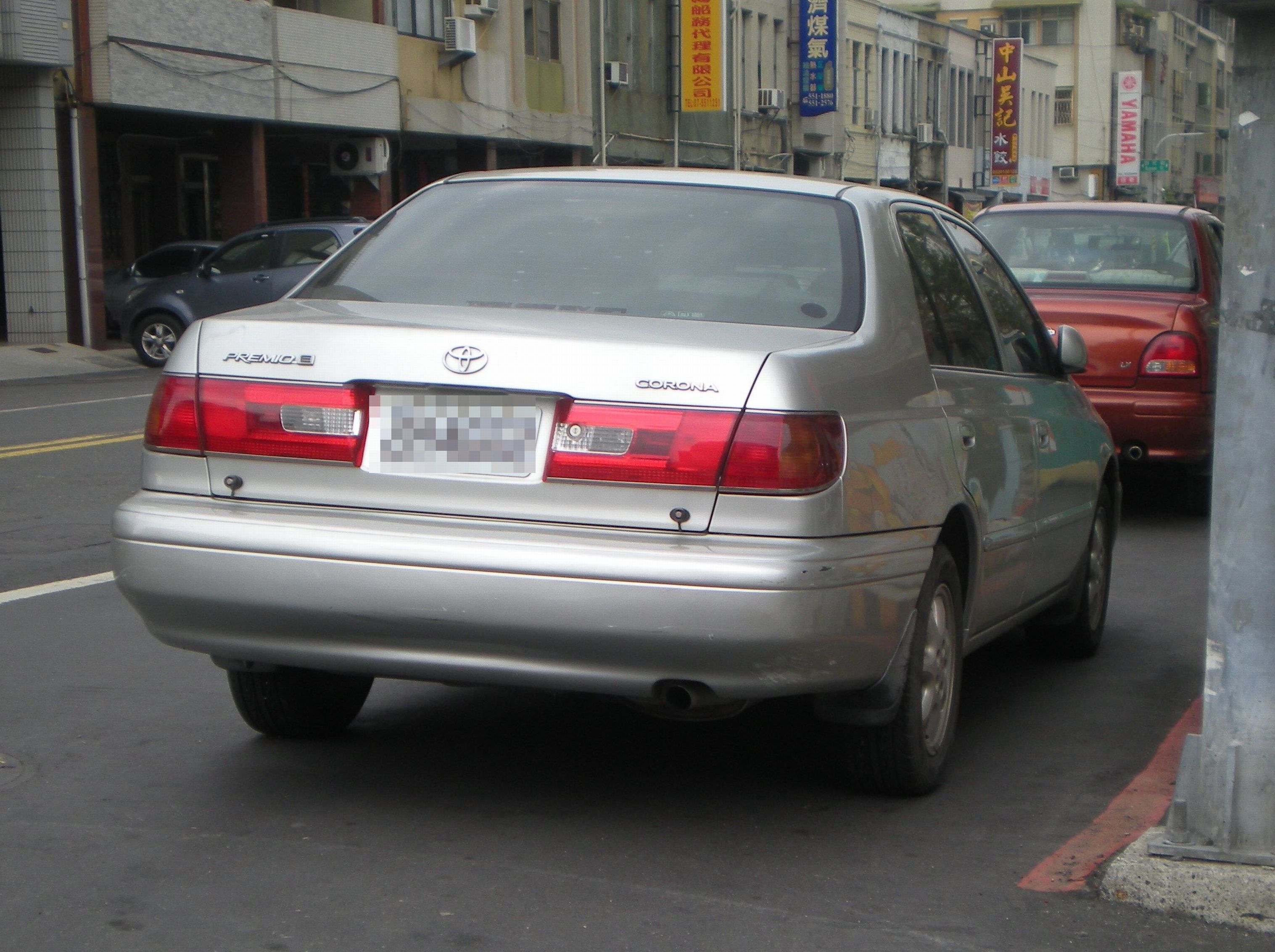
Facelift Corona Premio E (Taiwan)

Facelift Corona GLi (Batam, Indonesia)

=== Caldina (1997) ===
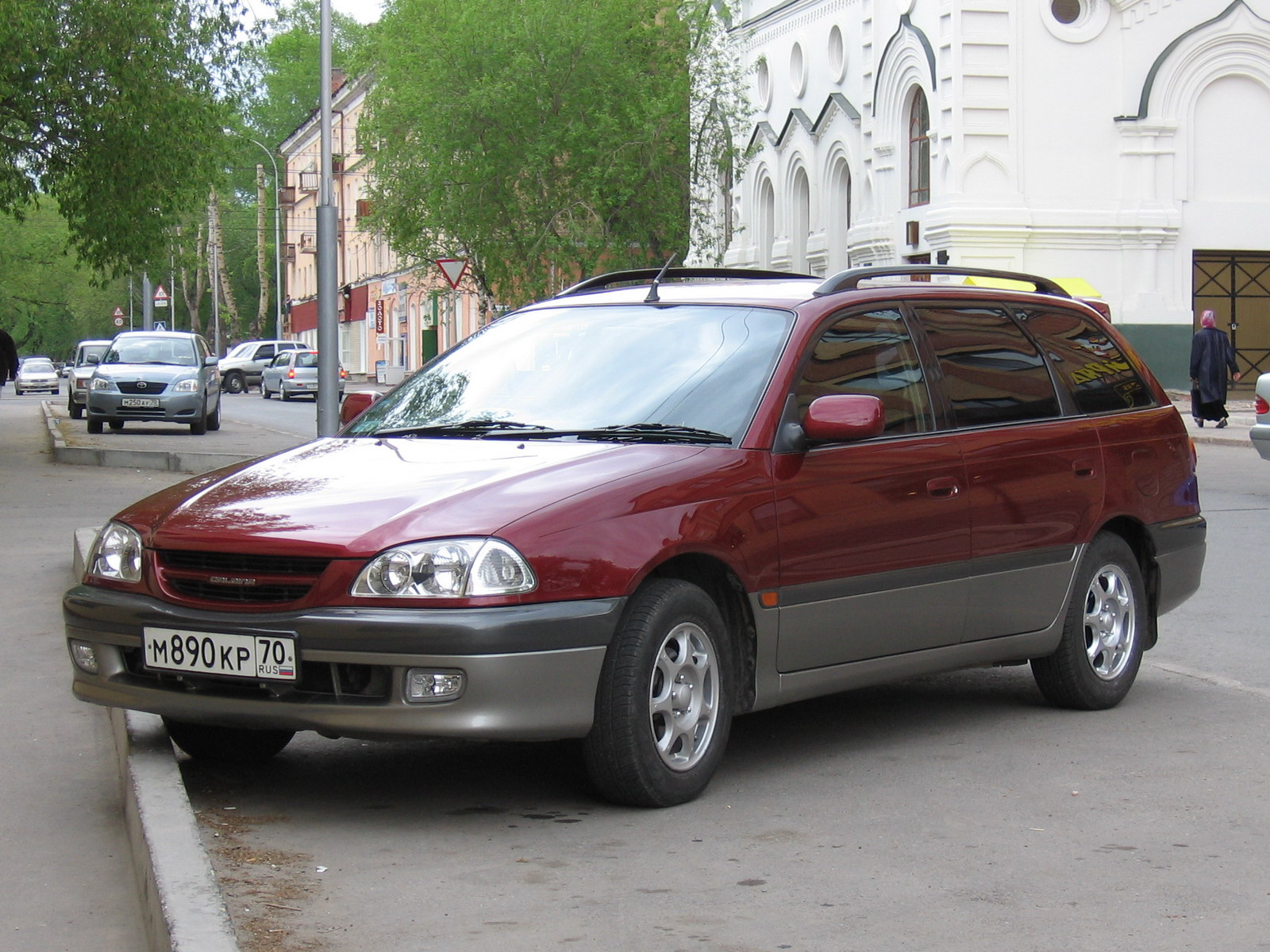
Caldina (T210)

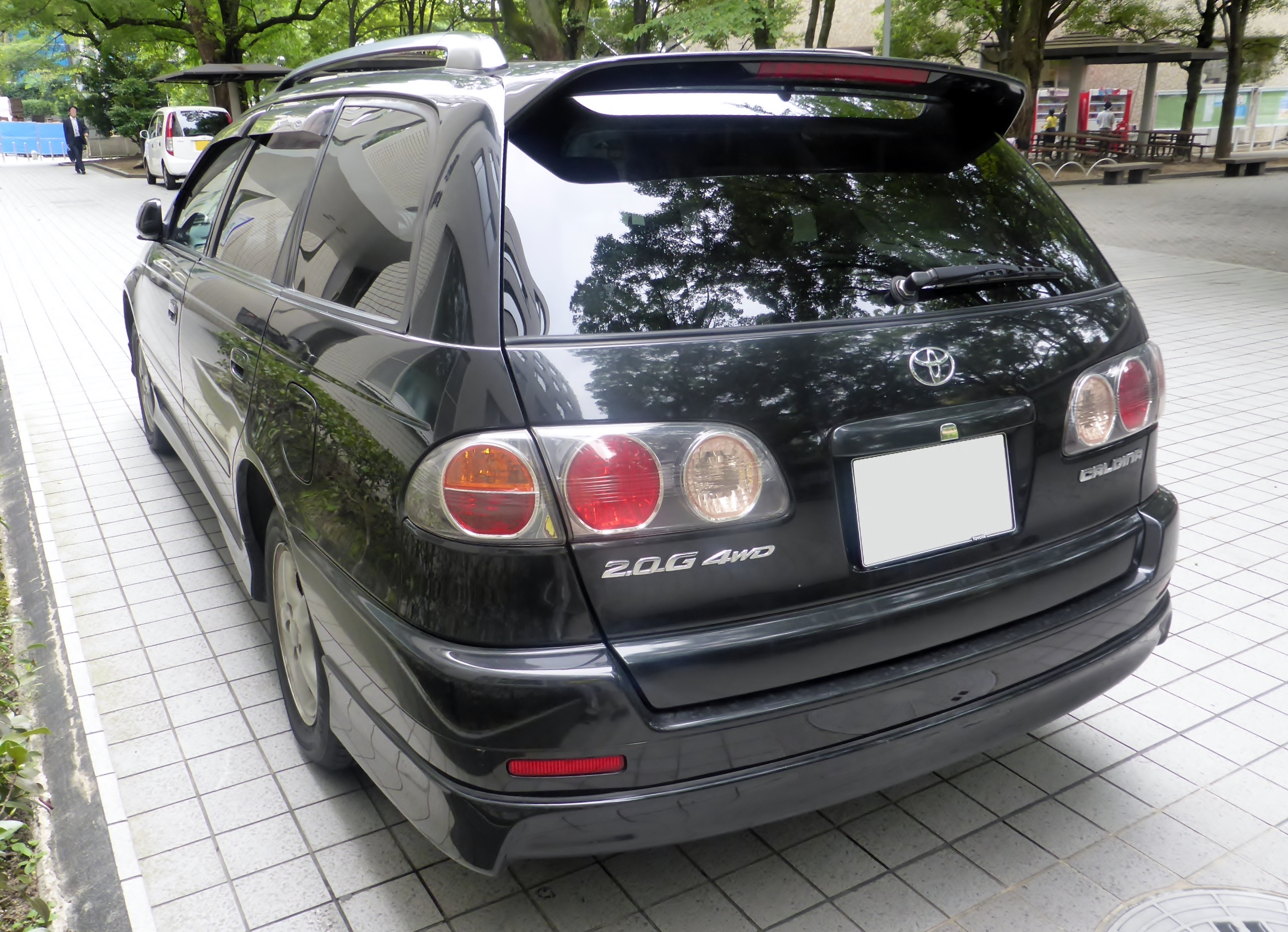
Caldina (T210)

Sharing a platform with the T210 series Toyota Corona and Toyota Carina, the Caldina is the Japanese version of the Toyota Avensis, which replaced the Carina E in Europe.

The 4WD models are coded ST215, and are offered as Active Sports GT with the 3S-GE engine. The top-of-the-line GT-T came with the turbocharged 260 PS (191 kW; 256 hp) 4th generation 3S-GTE engine, and included an all-wheel-drive system similar to the Toyota Celica GT-Four. The GT-T also came with optional electronic stability control (VSC) (standard on Active Sports versions). The Aerial version features a large sunroof and contoured roof racks as standard. Weighing 1,470 kg (3,241 lb), the Caldina GT-T offers similar performance to a Subaru WRX wagon achieving 0–100 km/h in 7 seconds. A refresh was given in 2000 with new bumpers and lamps a refreshed interior and extra lug added to the turbo manifold to stop the warping issue common on earlier GT-T models.

Engines for lesser models are the 1.8 L 7A-FE, the 2.0 L petrol 3S-FE, and the 2.2 L diesel 3C-TE.

=== South America (T220; 1997) ===
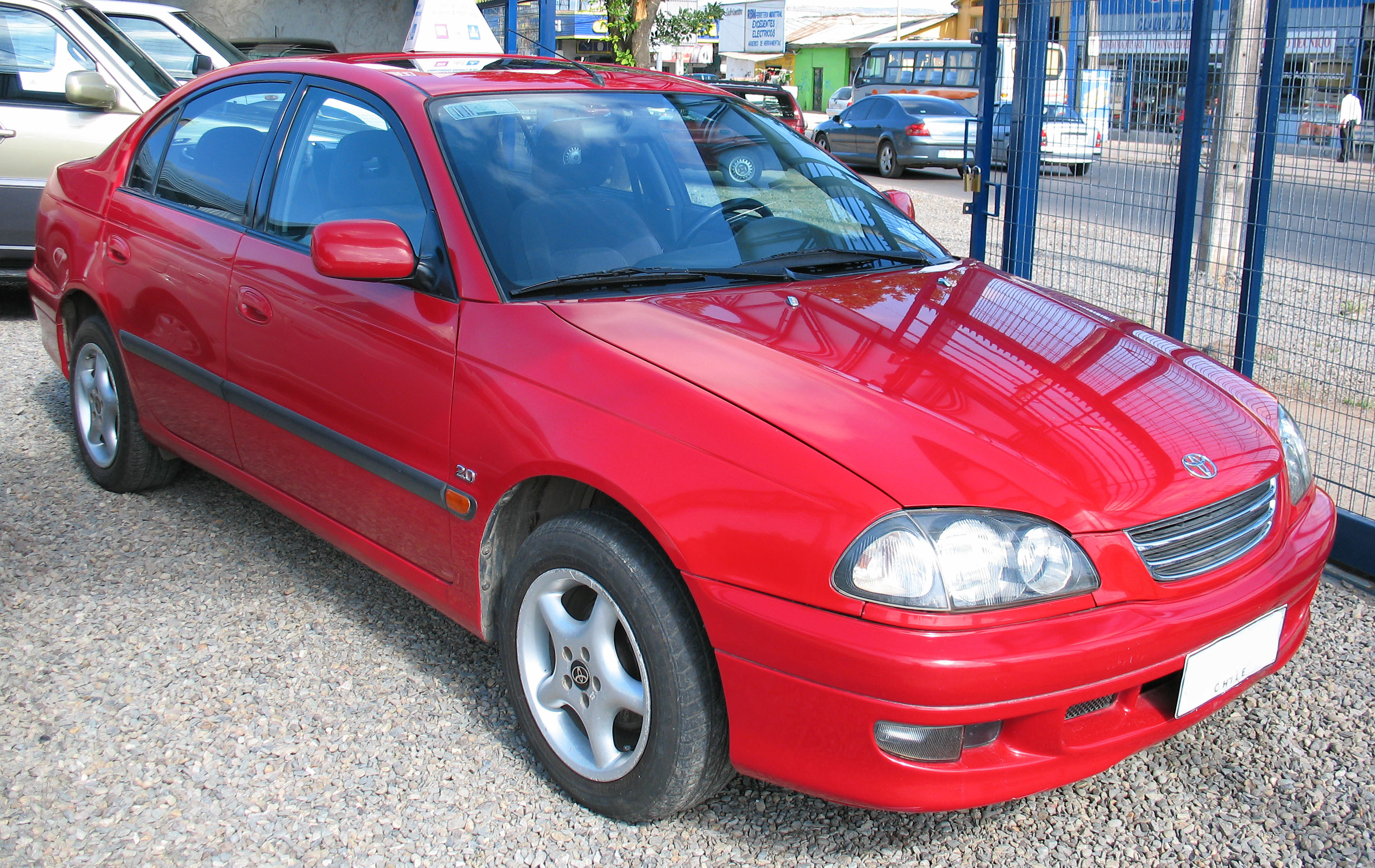
Corona Avensis

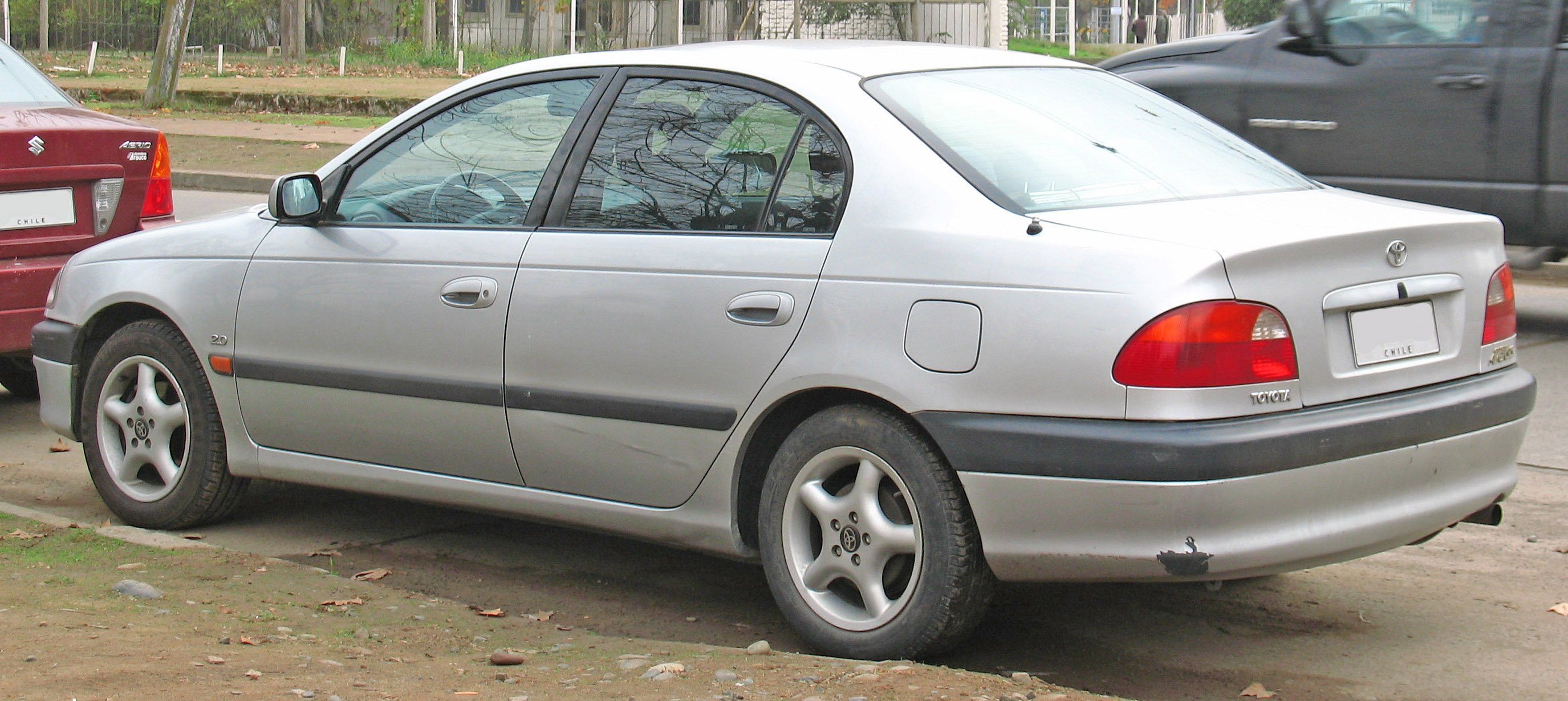
Corona Avensis

For the subsequent model series, the T220, the Corona name was dropped in Japan and most other markets. It was built as sedan, liftback and wagon. Only the wagon was sold in Japan as the Caldina, built on the T210 platform. The sedan and liftback were mainly sold in Europe as Avensis, while the lower grade model specifically for taxi use was called Corona. Four-cylinder engines for the Avensis are 1.6, 1.8, 2.0 petrol, and diesel/turbodiesel. The Corona Taxi was only available with the diesel engines. In South America, the Avensis was sold as the Corona Avensis, powered by 2.0-litre 3S-FE engine. This was the last Corona although the T-series platform was continued with the new T240, used for the third generation Caldina and the new Allion and Premio models.

== See also ==
- List of Toyota vehicles
