= Shervington =

Shervington is a surname. Notable people with the surname include:

- Ed Shervington (born 1986), Welsh rugby union player
- Pluto Shervington (1950–2024), Jamaican reggae musician, singer, engineer, and producer
- Tyrell Mildmay Shervington (born 1892), British oil company executive

== See also ==
- Jessica Shirvington (born 1979), Australian author
- Matt Shirvington (born 1978), Australian sprinter
