= Oran Park Raceway =

Motorsport track in Australia

- Grand Prix Circuit (1985–2010)
- Location: Narellan, New South Wales
- Coordinates: 34°00′22″S 150°44′2″E
- Opened: 17 February 1962; 64 years ago
- Closed: 25 January 2010; 16 years ago
- Major events: Former: World SBK (1988–1989); V8 Supercars; Oran Park V8 Supercar round (1971–2008); Australian GT (1982, 1985, 2006–2007); Australian Grand Prix (1974, 1977); Castrol 6 Hour (1984–1987); Tasman Series (1974–1975)
- Website: Oran Park

Grand Prix Circuit (1985–2010)
- Length: 2.620 km (1.628 mi)
- Turns: 12
- Race lap record: 1:01.6718 ( (Australia) Tim Leahey, Reynard 92D, 2000, Formula Holden)

Motorcycle Grand Prix Circuit (1974–2010)
- Length: 2.625 km (1.631 mi)
- Turns: 13
- Race lap record: 1:03.200 ( (Australia) John Bowe, Ralt RT4, 1984, Formula Mondial)

South Circuit (1964–2010)
- Length: 1.960 km (1.218 mi)
- Turns: 7
- Race lap record: 0:37.73 ( (Australia) Paul Stokell, Reynard 91D, 1994, Formula Holden)

North Circuit (1974–2010)
- Length: 0.660 km (0.410 mi)
- Turns: 6

Original Circuit (1962–1963)
- Length: 1.609 km (1.000 mi)
- Turns: 7

North Circuit

South Circuit

Oran Park Raceway was a motor racing circuit at Narellan south west of Sydney, New South Wales, Australia which was operational from February 1962 until its closure in January 2010. The track was designed and started by George Murray and Jack Allen. Since its closure in 2010 it has been (re)developed into housing.

== History ==
The circuit was established by the Singer Car Club, with its opening meeting held on the weekend of 17–18 February 1962. The land for the circuit was provided by wealthy Camden grazier Dan Cleary, who also ran an earthmoving business, which provided the equipment used to help build the circuit. A motorcycle race meeting was held on 17 February 1963, with reigning Grand Prix Champion Jim Redman being the star attraction. Redman won nearly every class and set the lap record of 50.4 seconds, only 0.8 seconds slower than Frank Matich's outright time set in a 2.6-litre Lotus Sports Car.

The original lap distance of 1.690 km (1.050 mi) was later extended to 1.960 km (1.218 mi) with a further extension in 1974, creating an alternative "Grand Prix" circuit of 2.625 km (1.631 mi) in length. The Grand Prix circuit featured a figure-eight shape with a bridge where the track crossed over itself. Despite the loop the racing direction was still regarded as being anticlockwise.

The complex also had a motocross track, a skidpan, a dirt track and four wheel drive course and a 1000-foot drag strip. Due to the nature of the land on which the circuit was built, most of the circuit was visible from the main grandstand or the grassed banks surrounding the track.

Oran Park was used regularly for rounds of the Australian Touring Car Championship, V8 Supercar Championship Series, Australian Drivers' Championship and Australian Sports Sedan Championship. The Australian Grand Prix was held at Oran Park in 1974 and 1977. In the 1970s the circuit attracted large crowds for the popular Toby Lee Series, initially run for Series Production Touring Cars and later for Sports Sedans. The inaugural Rothmans 500 for Touring Cars was staged in 1977 but the 1978 event was to be the second and last running of this endurance race. Shorter touring car endurance races would continue to be held at Oran Park during the 1980s and apart from the Sandown and Bathurst classics would last the longest before fading interest caused the compression of the endurance season to just those two events. The final such Oran Park enduro would be the 1989 Pepsi 300 won by Andrew Miedecke and Andrew Bagnall driving a Ford Sierra RS500. The final V8 Supercar round was held in December 2008, won by Garth Tander driving a Holden VE Commodore.

The land on which the racetrack was located was sold to the Government of New South Wales for a new housing development. This led to the eventual closure of the track and ended 48 years of motorsport heritage at the facility. The last motorcycle race meeting, the BelRay 6 Hour, was held on 21–22 November 2009. The final race meeting was scheduled for 23–24 January 2010 but was cancelled due to a lack of entries. This meant that the Independent Race Series event on 16 January 2010 was in fact the last race meeting to be held at the circuit. The circuit continued to run open track days, where the public could drive road cars and motorbikes around the full circuit. The last day before the track closed for good was Monday 25 January 2010.

== Australian Grand Prix ==
Oran Park twice hosted the Australian Grand Prix during its 42 years of operation, with both events held for Formula 5000 cars. The first Grand Prix held at Oran Park in 1974 was won by Max Stewart driving a Lola T330. The last time the circuit hosted the event was in 1977 when Warwick Brown drove his Lola T430 Chevrolet to victory. Alan Jones had actually 'won' the 1977 race on the road and was some 40 seconds ahead of Walker when he crossed the line for what should have been the finish. However he was penalised 60 seconds for jumping the start and would eventually be classified in 4th place.

== Australian Touring Car Championship ==
Oran Park Raceway has hosted a round of the Australian Touring Car Championship every year since 1971. 2008 was the final year of Oran Park in the V8 Supercar Championship Series. Allan Moffat and Mark Skaife are the most successful drivers at Oran Park in the ATCC, with six round wins each.

The first ever race in 1971 saw Moffat in his Ford Boss 302 Mustang and Bob Jane driving his 427 cui powered Chevrolet Camaro ZL-1 go into the round on 31 and 34 points respectively with Moffat needing to either win or score more 3 or more points than Jane to claim the title. With both drivers starting from the front row a capacity crowd saw a titanic struggle with Jane claiming the win from Moffat and securing his 3rd ATCC championship. In a bizarre happening during the race, a spectator driving a road registered Valiant drove through an open gate and onto the circuit. As there were Group E cars in the race, the officials seemed to miss the extra car and the race continued with the driver managing to complete a few laps before exiting the circuit.

=== Touring Car round winners ===
| Year | Driver | Car | Entrant |
Improved Production
| 1971 | (Australia) Bob Jane | Chevrolet Camaro ZL-1 | Bob Jane Racing Team |
| 1972 | (Canada) Allan Moffat | Ford Boss 302 Mustang | Coca-Cola Team A.M.R. |
Group C
| 1973 | (Canada) Allan Moffat | Ford XY Falcon GTHO Phase 3 | Ford Works Team |
| 1974 | (Canada) Allan Moffat | Ford XB Falcon GT Hardtop | Allan Moffat Racing |
| 1975 | (Australia) Allan Grice | Holden LH Torana SL/R 5000 L34 | Craven Mild Racing |
| 1976 | (Canada) Allan Moffat | Ford XB Falcon GT Hardtop | Allan Moffat Racing |
| 1977 | (Canada) Allan Moffat | Ford XB Falcon GT Hardtop | Moffat Ford Dealers |
| 1978 | (Australia) Peter Brock | Holden LX Torana A9X SS Hatchback | Holden Dealer Team |
| 1979 | (Australia) Bob Morris | Holden Torana LX A9X SS Hatchback | Ron Hodgson Channel 7 Racing |
| 1980 | (Australia) Bob Morris | Holden VB Commodore | Craven Mild Racing |
| 1981 | (Australia) Dick Johnson | Ford XD Falcon | Palmer Tube Mills |
| 1982 | (Australia) Kevin Bartlett | Chevrolet Camaro Z28 | Nine Network Racing Team |
| 1983 | (Canada) Allan Moffat | Mazda RX-7 | Peter Stuyvesant International Racing |
| 1984 | (Australia) Bob Morris | Mazda RX-7 | Barry Jones |
Group A
| 1985 | (New Zealand) Robbie Francevic | Volvo 240T | Mark Petch Motorsport |
| 1986 | (Australia) George Fury | Nissan Skyline DR30 RS | Peter Jackson Nissan Racing |
| 1987 | (New Zealand) Jim Richards | BMW M3 (E30) | JPS Team BMW |
| 1988 | (Australia) Dick Johnson | Ford Sierra RS500 | Shell Ultra-Hi Racing |
| 1989 | (Australia) Peter Brock | Ford Sierra RS500 | Mobil 1 Racing |
| 1990 | (New Zealand) Jim Richards | Nissan Skyline R32 GT-R | Nissan Motorsport Australia |
| 1991 | (Australia) Mark Skaife | Nissan Skyline R32 GT-R | Nissan Motor Sport |
| 1992 | (Australia) Mark Skaife | Nissan Skyline R32 GT-R | Winfield Team Nissan |
Group 3A Touring Cars
| 1993 | (New Zealand) Jim Richards | Holden VP Commodore | Winfield Racing |
| 1994 | (Australia) Glenn Seton | Ford EB Falcon | Peter Jackson Racing |
| 1995 | (Australia) John Bowe | Ford EF Falcon | Shell FAI Racing |
| 1996 | (Australia) Peter Brock | Holden VR Commodore | Holden Racing Team |
| 1997 | (New Zealand) Greg Murphy | Holden VS Commodore | Holden Racing Team |
| 1998 | (Australia) Craig Lowndes | Holden VS Commodore | Holden Racing Team |
V8 Supercars
| 1999 | (Australia) Mark Skaife | Holden VT Commodore | Holden Racing Team |
| 2000 | (Australia) Mark Skaife | Holden VT Commodore | Holden Racing Team |
| 2001 | (Australia) Mark Skaife | Holden VX Commodore | Holden Racing Team |
| 2002 | (Australia) Mark Skaife | Holden VX Commodore | Holden Racing Team |
| 2003 | (Australia) Marcos Ambrose | Ford BA Falcon | Stone Brothers Racing |
| 2004 | (Australia) Marcos Ambrose | Ford BA Falcon | Stone Brothers Racing |
| 2005 | (Australia) Russell Ingall | Ford BA Falcon | Stone Brothers Racing |
| 2006 | (Australia) Craig Lowndes | Ford BA Falcon | Team Betta Electrical |
| 2007 | (Australia) Lee Holdsworth | Holden VE Commodore | Garry Rogers Motorsport |
| 2008 | (Australia) Garth Tander | Holden VE Commodore | Holden Racing Team |

== Touring Car endurance races ==
A number of endurance races for Touring Cars were staged at Oran Park Raceway between 1977 and 1989.

| Year | Race | Winning driver(s) | Car | Entrant | Status |
Group C
| 1977 | Rothmans 500 | (Australia) Warren Cullen | Holden LH Torana SL/R 5000 L34 | Pioneer Electronics | Non–championship race |
| 1978 | Rothmans 500 | (Australia) John Harvey | Holden LX Torana SS A9X | Marlboro Holden Dealer Team | Non–championship race |
| 1978 | ABE Copiers 250 | (Australia) Peter Brock | Holden LX Torana SS A9X | Marlboro Holden Dealer Team | Round 1 of 1978 Australian Championship of Makes |
| 1981 | Valvoline 250 | (Australia) Dick Johnson | Ford XD Falcon | Palmer Tube Mills | Round 2 of 1981 Australian Endurance Championship |
| 1982 | Perrier Gold Cup | (Australia) Bob Morris (Australia) Alan Jones | Ford XE Falcon | Alan Jones | Round 1 of 1982 Australian Endurance Championship |
| 1983 | Oran Park 250 | (Australia) George Fury | Nissan Bluebird Turbo | Nissan Motor Co. | Round 2 of 1983 Australian Endurance Championship |
| 1984 | Valvoline 250 | (Canada) Allan Moffat (Australia) Gregg Hansford | Mazda RX-7 | Peter Stuyvesant International Racing | Round 2 of 1984 Australian Endurance Championship |
Group A
| 1985 | Pepsi 250 | (New Zealand) Jim Richards | BMW 635 CSi | JPS Team BMW | Round 2 of 1985 Australian Endurance Championship |
| 1986 | Pepsi 250 | (Australia) George Fury | Nissan Skyline DR30 RS | Peter Jackson Nissan Racing | Round 6 of 1986 Australian Endurance Championship |
| 1987 | Pepsi 250 | (New Zealand) Jim Richards | BMW M3 (E30) | JPS Team BMW | Non–championship race |
| 1988 | Pepsi 250 | (Australia) Peter Brock (New Zealand) Jim Richards | BMW M3 (E30) | Mobil 1 Racing | Non–championship race |
| 1989 | Pepsi 300 | (Australia) Andrew Miedecke (New Zealand) Andrew Bagnall | Ford Sierra RS500 | Miedecke Motorsport | Non–championship race |

== Superbike World Championship ==
Oran Park twice played host to the Superbike World Championship. It hosted the second last round of the inaugural season of the championship in 1988, and also hosted the second last round in 1989 (since 1990 the Australian round has been held at the Phillip Island Grand Prix Circuit in Victoria).

Australia's future five time 500cc Motorcycle World Champion Mick Doohan easily won both races in 1988 on his Yamaha FZR750, while fellow Australians Peter Goddard and Michael Dowson won the 1989 rounds heat races also riding the Yahama FZR750.

A number of the international WSBK riders were critical of the Oran Park circuit, particularly of the fact that many of the concrete walls that lined the outside of the circuit (especially on the outside of turns 3, 4, 9 and 12) left little to no runoff room should a rider come off their bike.

== NASCAR / AUSCAR ==
During the mid-1990s, the Australian NASCAR and AUSCAR series raced at Oran Park, utilising the 1.960 km (1.218 mi) South Circuit, with the track's lights upgraded to allow for night racing. The night races at Oran Park were a popular addition to the series, which other than one-off support races at the Bathurst 1000 the Gold Coast Indy 300, had previously run exclusively on the only paved oval tracks in Australia, the Bob Jane owned Calder Park Thunderdome in Melbourne and the Speedway Super Bowl at the Adelaide International Raceway.

== Lap records ==
As a comparison, in November 1974, Warwick Brown set the outright lap record on the then new "Grand Prix Circuit" with a 1:05.2 lap in a Lola T332 Formula 5000. Ten years later in August 1984, John Bowe set the outright lap record of 1:03.9 in a Ralt RT4 (1.6L) Formula Mondial. When the circuit closed in 2010, the outright lap record stood at 1:01.6718 by Tim Leahey in a Reynard 92D-Holden (3.8L) Formula Holden set in July 2000. Note that in mid-1984 the circuit was changed slightly with the addition of a straight run after turn 3 heading to what was turn 5 and eliminating what was turn 4. This made turn 3, and subsequently the new turn 4, slightly faster and gave the Grand Prix Circuit 12 corners instead of 13. The result was an overall improvement in lap times of approximately 2 seconds per lap. Motorbikes continued to use the pre-1984 sequence of turns until one year before the circuits closure.

The official race lap records at Oran Park Raceway are listed as:

| Class | Driver | Vehicle | Time | Date |
Grand Prix Circuit (1984–2010): 2.620 km (1.628 mi)
| Formula Holden | Tim Leahey | Reynard 92D | 1:01.6718 | 30 July 2000 |
| Formula Mondial | John Bowe | Ralt RT4 | 1:03.900 | 19 August 1984 |
| Formula Three | Michael Caruso | Dallara F301 | 1:03.9747 | 13 July 2003 |
| Australian Formula 2 | Jon Crooke | Cheetah Mk8 | 1:05.8 | 8 June 1986 |
| Sports Sedan | Kerry Baily | Nissan 300ZX-Chevrolet | 1:06.8983 | 28 July 2001 |
| Superkart | Charly Lambous | Stockman | 1:07.063 | September 1999 |
| V8 Supercars | Craig Lowndes | Holden VT Commodore | 1:08.0630 | 5 September 1999 |
| Nations Cup | Paul Stokell | Lamborghini Diablo GTR | 1:08.6267 | 13 July 2003 |
| Porsche Carrera Cup | Alex Davison | Porsche 911 (996) GT3 Cup | 1:09.6224 | 13 August 2003 |
| Super Touring | Brad Jones | Audi A4 Quattro | 1:10.0464 | 30 August 1998 |
| Group A Touring Cars | Mark Skaife | Nissan Skyline R32 GT-R | 1:10.26 | 21 June 1992 |
| Fujitsu V8 Supercars Series | Dean Canto | Ford EL Falcon | 1:10.3812 | 16 June 2000 |
| Production Sports Cars | Tim Mackie | Lotus Elise HPE | 1:10.9768 | 31 May 2009 |
| GT Championship | David Wall | Dodge Viper GTS ACR | 1:11.2863 | 7 May 2006 |
| Formula Ford | Steven Richards | Van Diemen RF94 | 1:11.5614 | 24 July 1994 |
| Group C Touring Cars | Dick Johnson | Ford XE Falcon | 1:15.4 | 19 August 1984 |
| Performance Cars | Chris Alajajian | Subaru Impreza WRX STi | 1:15.6008 | 13 August 2005 |
| Invitation Sports Cars | Stan Adler | Porsche 911 Coupe | 1:15.6234 | 30 August 1998 |
| GT Performance | Bob Pearson | Mazda RX-7 | 1:16.0830 | 13 July 2003 |
| Aussie Racing Cars | Nick Percat | ARC Falcon-Yamaha | 1:16.6124 | 12 August 2006 |
| Club Cars | Wayne Wakefield | Mazda 808 Station Wagon | 1:16.8968 | 30 August 1998 |
| Touring Car Masters | Gavin Bullas | 1969 Ford Boss Mustang | 1:18.0507 | 27 April 2008 |
| Commodore Cup | Ashley Cooper | Holden VS Commodore | 1:18.2003 | 22 April 2007 |
| Formula Vee 1600 | Ryan Simpson | Jacer F2k6 | 1:18.8632 | 19 June 2006 |
| Saloon Cars | Kris Walton | Ford AU Falcon | 1:19.7760 | 28 October 2006 |
| Production Cars | Scott Loadsman | Holden VX Commodore | 1:20.3087 | 24 November 2001 |
| Mirage Series | Warren Luff | Mitsubishi Mirage RS | 1:20.7364 | 15 August 1999 |
| Porsche 944 | John Morriss | Porsche 944 | 1:21.2535 | 31 August 2008 |
| V8 Brutes/V8 Utes | Grant Johnson | Holden VZ SS Ute | 1:21.4087 | 7 May 2006 |
| Group Nb | Cameron Tilley | Chrysler Valiant S Series | 1:21.6603 | 18 June 2000 |
| Formula Vee 1200 | Benjamin Porter | Jacer | 1:21.9271 | 19 July 2003 |
| MG-F Trophy | Warren Luff | MG-F Trophy | 1:23.5348 | 17 August 2003 |
| HQ Holden | Vince Gatt | HQ Holden | 1:27.6977 | 15 August 1999 |
Motorcycle Grand Prix Circuit (1974–2010): 2.625 km (1.631 mi)
| Formula 5000 | Warwick Brown | Lola T332 | 1:05.200 | 17 November 1974 |
| Superbikes | Mat Mladin | Kawasaki Ninja ZX-7R | 1:10.2005 | 6 August 1995 |
| Formula Xtreme Motorcycles | Kevin Curtain | Yamaha YZF1000R | 1:10.8232 | 11 October 1998 |
| 250cc GP | Craig Connell | Yamaha TZ 250 | 1:12.9600 | 24 September 1995 |
| 600cc Supersports | Adam Fergusson | CBR600F | 1:13.000 | 5 March 2000 |
| 125cc GP | Jay Taylor | HBS 125 | 1:13.8952 | 26 August 2001 |
| Group C Touring Cars | Peter Brock | Holden VH Commodore SS | 1:15.34 | 27 May 1984 |
| 250cc Production | Peter Archer | Suzuki RGV250 | 1:16.7300 | 27 June 1993 |
South Circuit (1964–2010): 1.960 km (1.218 mi)
| Formula Holden | Paul Stokell | Reynard 91D | 0:37.73 | 28 August 1994 |
| Formula Mondial | Andrew Miedecke | Ralt RT4 | 0:39.9 | 21 August 1983 |
| Formula 5000 | Johnnie Walker | Lola T330 | 0:40.0 | 3 February 1974 |
| Group A Sports Cars | Bap Romano | Romano WE84 | 0:41.1 | 19 August 1984 |
| Super Touring | Brad Jones | Audi A4 Quattro | 0:42.801 | 26 April 1998 |
| Truck racing | Ian 'Inky' Tulloch | Freightliner Trucks | 0:52.4607 | 24 March 2002 |

== Gallery ==
Photos from Oran Park Raceway
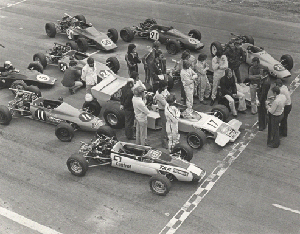
Bowin racing car coaching clinic at Oran Park, Sydney Australia in 1975

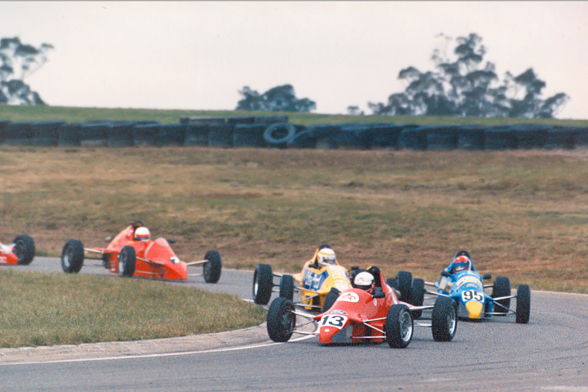
Motorcraft Formula Ford Driver to Europe Series, Oran Park Raceway, 1989

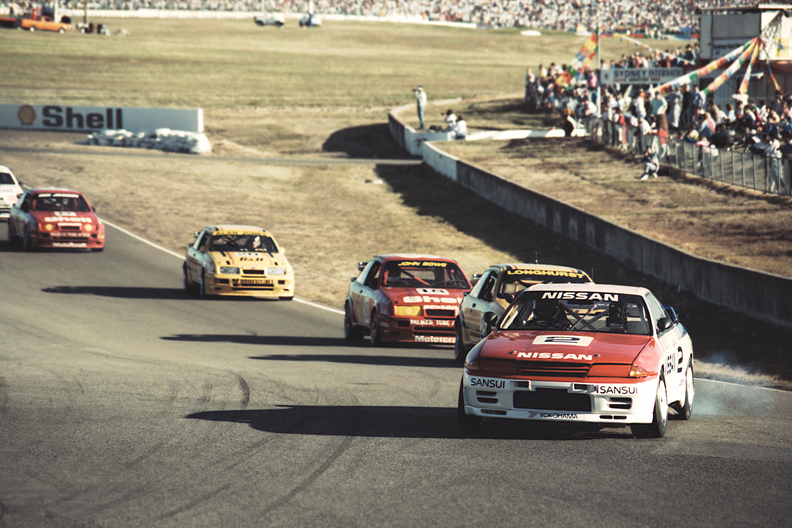
1990 Australian Touring Car Championship at Oran Park Raceway

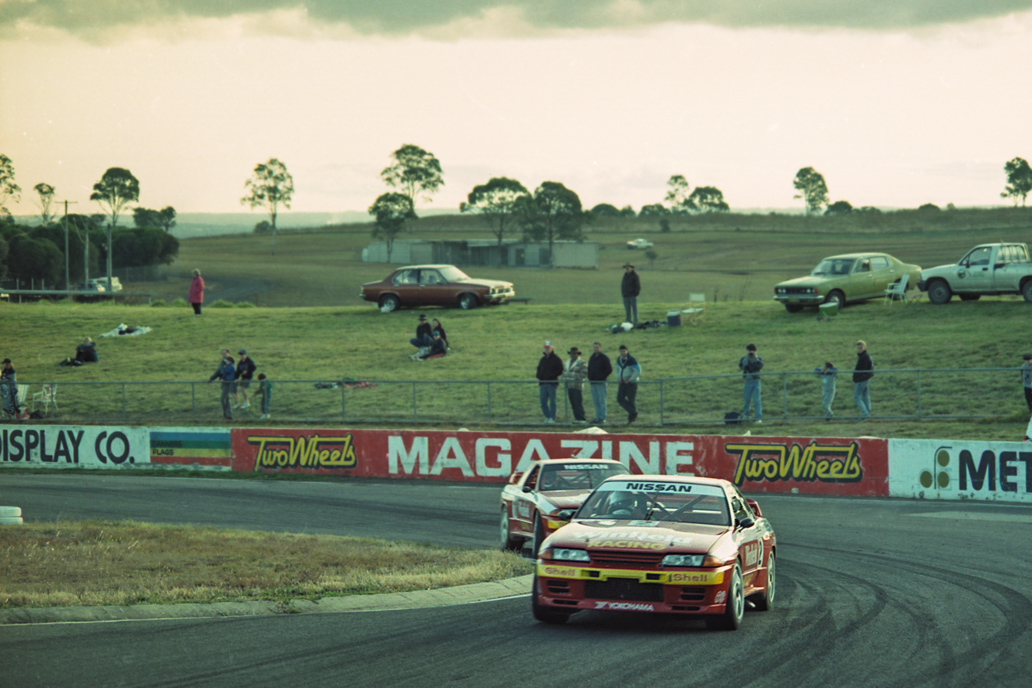
1992 Australian Touring Car Championship at Oran Park Raceway

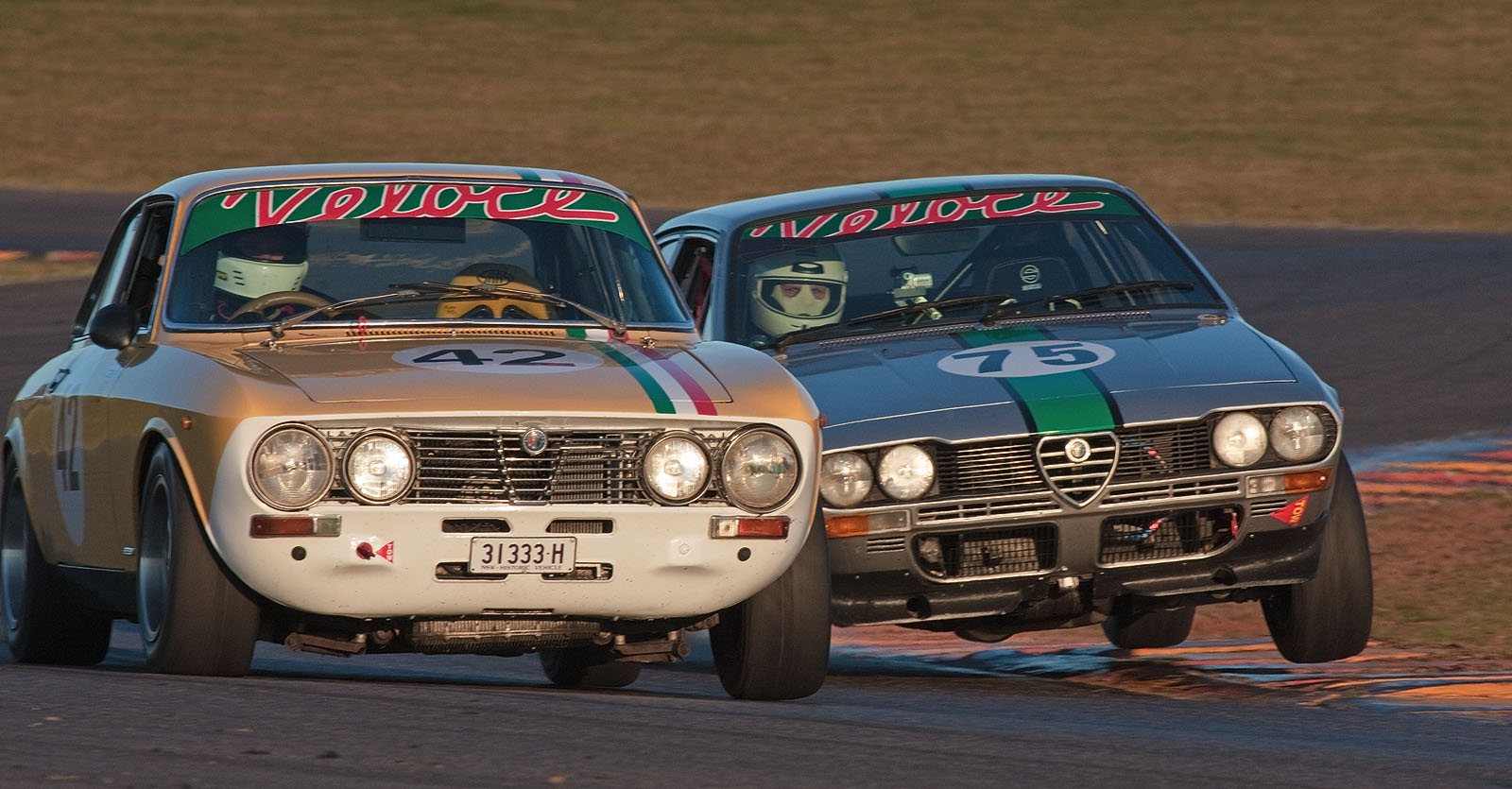
Festival of sports cars. Oran Park, Australia. June 2009

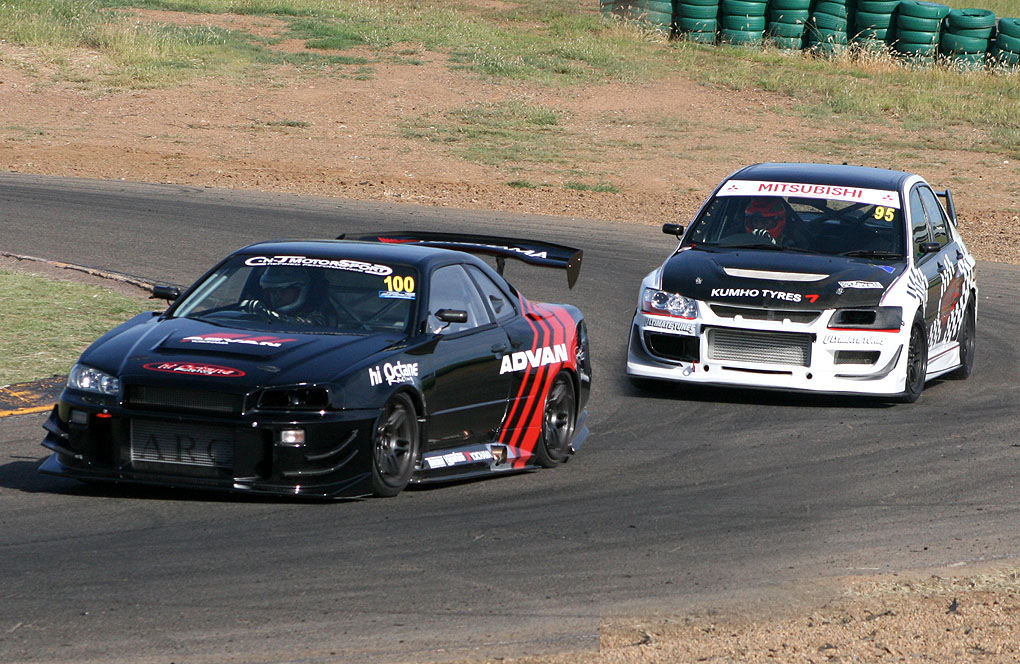
Battle for the Super Lap supremacy at Oran Park Raceway in 2009

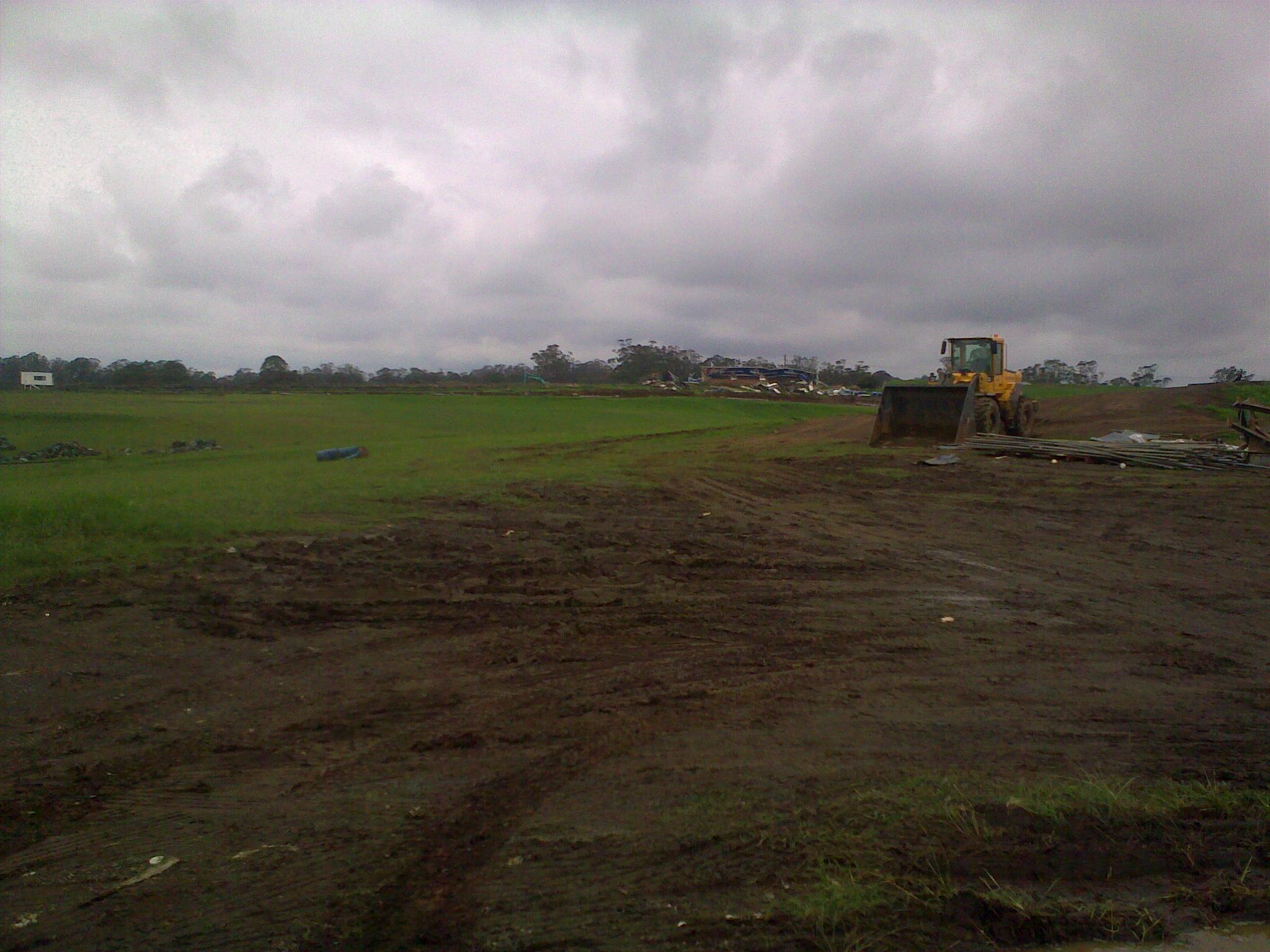
Oran Park Raceway being demolished on February 13 2010
