= Bill Woods =

Australian television journalist (born 1962)

- Born: 12 May 1962 (age 64); Moruya, New South Wales
- Occupations: Journalist; Radio host and broadcaster television host and broadcaster Author

William Woods (born 1962 in Moruya, New South Wales) is an Australian television journalist, radio and television broadcaster, and author. He is best known as the presenter, alongside Sandra Sully, of Network Ten's Ten News at Five in Sydney (a role which he left in November 2012) and Sports Tonight. He co-hosted Bill & Boz on Fox Sports News.

== Early career ==
In 1982, Woods graduated with a Bachelor of Arts degree in Professional Writing at Canberra College of Advanced Education (now University of Canberra) and in early 1983, began another three-month course in Commercial Radio Broadcasting at the Australian Film and Television School. After that course he was employed, along with classmate Mike Hammond, by 2BS Bathurst owner Ron Camplin, who then used the young DJs as morning and afternoon hosts for one of his other regional stations, 2LF Young.

In early 1984, Woods was offered a journalism cadetship with Radio 2WS in Sydney. He filled all kinds of news reporting and presenting roles, as well as major sporting event coverage. This included a trip to The Championships, Wimbledon in 1987, to cover Pat Cash's historic win. The following year he accepted the role of 2WS Sports Director. In late 1988, he was offered a part-time job at Network Ten, which soon resulted in an offer of full-time work as a sports reporter for the evening news.

== Television career ==
Woods began his television career with Network Ten in 1989. He began as a reporter, progressing to fill-in presenting on weekends and by the end of the year became the main sports anchor alongside Ian Leslie in Ten's half-hour evening news. Soon after Eric Walters replaced Leslie, Woods was replaced by Graham Hughes. After stints on Good Morning Australia with Tim Webster and Kerri-Anne Kennerley as a sports commentator, Woods was asked to fill in for Webster on a few occasions. This led to his appointment in a series of sport broadcasts outside the news department.

He was the presenter for Ten's National Basketball League coverage from 1992 to the mid-1990s, as well as acting as play-by-play commentator for Sydney Kings home games. Woods continued in the news room as regular weekend presenter on Ten's Sports Tonight from 1996 to 2005, as well as acting as a back-up presenter to Tim Webster on weeknights.

Woods was also the face of Ten's motorsport coverage from 1997 to 2006. He hosted the magazine programme RPM, six of those years with former World Champion Barry Sheene. Sheene and Woods also anchored and commentated on the World Motorcycle Championship (Motogp). The pair became firm friends, and Woods broke down during the episode dedicated to Sheene after his death from cancer in 2003. In 2004 Woods also filled the role of commentator in the V8 Supercar Championships Series alongside regular commentator Neil Crompton.

In January 2006, Woods began presenting Ten Early News. In 2007, he permanently took over Ten Weekend News, replacing Tracey Spicer.

In January 2009, Woods replaced Ron Wilson as presenter of Ten News at Five in Sydney. Woods's time presenting Ten News at Five in Sydney and his time at the network ended when the Network Ten reformatted all Ten News at Five broadcasts to a single-anchor format in late 2012. His last broadcast aired on 30 November 2012. Woods was with Network Ten for 23 years.

He hosted SportsFan Clubhouse on 7mate, a sports entertainment show made up of sports news, views and social media. Also on 7mate, he hosted Season 2 of Shannons Legends of Motorsport, filling in for Neil Crompton.

From 2016 to 2020 he co-hosted Bill & Boz on Fox Sports News, which was a sports entertainment show made up of sports news, views and social media.

In 2021, Woods was a commentator on the Seven Network’s new series Ultimate Tag.

== Highlights ==
Woods's first major sports anchoring role was at the 1994 Commonwealth Games in Victoria, British Columbia, Canada. He fronted Ten's national news coverage of the 1996 Atlanta Olympic Games and 2000 Sydney Olympic Games and was prime-time anchor of the 2010 Delhi Commonwealth Games telecast.

Woods co-hosted with Rob Mundle on the ill-fated 1998 Sydney to Hobart Yacht Race. With Ten being the official TV broadcaster of the race, Woods delivered regular news updates from Hobart on the unfolding tragedy, brought about by severe gale-force winds and sea swells reaching several metres in height. Five competing boats were sunk and six people died.

He has also hosted the 2007 Rugby World Cup from France, interviewed David Beckham as well as hosting LA Galaxy's exhibition match with Sydney FC, as well as numerous Australian Grand Prix, Australian motorcycle Grand Prix, Gold Coast Indy 300 and Bathurst 1000 telecasts.

He has anchored five Logie award-winning telecasts: four for the Bathurst 1000 coverage, one for the 1994 Commonwealth Games. He has also anchored and commentated on a variety of other events and series, including the 2007 and 2010 Federal Election telecasts, Triathlon Grand Prix and Australian Ladies Masters golf tournament.

In 2009 and 2010 Woods hosted a two-hour sports variety show called Thursday Night Live on the One HD channel.

== Radio ==
During the summer of 2007–08, Woods occasionally filled in as a stand-in on the nightly 2UE sports program, Sports Today. In 2009-10 he and Deborah Knight also filled in on Weekends with George and Paul.

Woods co hosted The Hit Up, with Debbie Spillane, on ABC Radio Grandstand.

Since 2020, Woods has been a casual presenter on 2GB, filling in on Sports Today, weekend mornings, weekday nights, weekday mid-dawns and weekday afternoons. He also worked as a commentator on 2GB's coverage of the 2020 Paris Olympic Games, calling a variety of events including soccer, tennis, basketball and water polo.

== Author ==
In his time away from television commitments, he has written a book, Legends of Speed, about Australia's great race drivers. His second book, El Magic: The Life of Hazem El Masri, a biography of rugby league player Hazem El Masri, was released in 2007.
