= 1978 Rothmans 500 =

The 1978 Rothmans 500 was an endurance motor race for Group C Touring Cars. The event was held at Oran Park in New South Wales, Australia on 4 June 1978 over 222 laps of the 2.7 km circuit, a total distance of 599.4 km. This was the second and last Rothmans 500 race for Touring Cars to be held at Oran Park, the 1977 Rothmans 500 having been the inaugural event.

== Results ==
| Position | Drivers | No. | Car | Entrant | Laps |
| 1 | John Harvey, Charlie O'Brien | 76 | Holden LX Torana SS5000 A9X | Marlboro Holden Dealer Team | 222 |
| 2 | Garth Wigston, Bruce Gowans | | Holden LX Torana A9X | | 222 |
| 3 | Scotty Taylor, Kevin Kennedy | 15 | Holden LX Torana SS5000 A9X | | 221 |
| 4 | Peter Williamson, Brian Sampson | 77 | Toyota Celica GT | | 219 |
| 5 | Peter Hopwood, Jim Davidson | | Ford Capri V6 | | 217 |
| 6 | Gary Cooke, Dave McMillan | 11 | Holden LX Torana SLR5000 A9X | | 213 |
| 7 | Bill O'Brien, Gary Willmington | | Ford Falcon | | 213 |
| 8 | Warren Cullen, John Walker | | Holden LX Torana A9X | | 213 |
| 9 | Terry Shiel, Neil Mason | | Mazda RX-3 | | 209 |
| 10 | Alan Bryant, Dean Gall | | Mazda RX-3 | | 209 |
| 11 | John Smith, Graham Smith | | Holden LX Torana A9X | | 207 |
| 12 | Neville Bridges, Steve Land | | Holden Torana GTR XU-1 | | 206 |
| 13 | Barry Jones, T Daly | | Mazda RX-3 | | 203 |
| 14 | B Potts, Bruce Stewart | | Mazda RX-3 | | 193 |
| 15 | John Faulkner, Gary Dumbrell | | Ford Capri V6 | | 190 |
| 16 | Barry Seton, Don Smith | | Holden LX Torana A9X | Amco Pty Ltd | 185 |
| 17 | Ian Sonnemann, John English | | Ford Escort RS2000 | | 178 |
| 18 | Bob Forbes, Kevin Bartlett | 10 | Holden LX Torana SS5000 A9X | | 178 |
| 19 | Dick Johnson, Vern Schuppan | | Ford XC Falcon | | 158 |
| DNF | Fred Gibson, Christine Gibson | | Holden LX Torana A9X | King George Tavern | |
| DNF | Bill Stanley, I Messner | | Ford Escort RS2000 | | |
| DNF | Sue Ransom, Lella Lombardi | 99 | Ford Capri V6 | ABE Copiers P/L | |
| DNF | Allan Grice, John Leffler | 6 | Holden LX Torana SS5000 A9X | Craven Mild Racing | |
| DNF | C Warner, Geoff Leeds | | Ford Capri V6 | | |
| DNF | Murray Carter, Graeme Lawrence | 18 | Ford XC Falcon | | |
| DNF | Ron Dickson, John Smith | | Ford XC Falcon | | |
| DNF | Peter Jansen, Phil Brock | | Holden LX Torana A9X | | |
| DNF | Allan Moffat, Colin Bond | | Ford XC Falcon | Moffat-Ford Dealers Team | |
| DNF | Leo Leonard, Garry Sprague | | Ford XC Falcon | | |
| DNF | Garry Rogers, D Wilcox | 14 | Holden LX Torana SS5000 A9X | | |
| DNF | Alan Cant, Don Holland | | Ford Capri V6 | | |
| DNF | G Ryan, P Arnull | | Holden LX Torana A9X | | |
| DNF | Bob Morris, John Fitzpatrick | | Holden LX Torana A9X | Ron Hodgson | |
| DNF | J Duggan, B Wheeler | | Mazda RX-3 | | |
| DNF | L Brown, B Boyd | | Mazda RX-3 | | |
| DNF | Ken Talbert, B Lee | | Holden Torana GTR XU-1 | | |
| DNF | B Allen, P McDonnell | | Holden LH Torana SLR5000 L34 | | |
| DNF | John Goss, Rusty French | | Ford XC Falcon | | |
| DNF | Jack Brabham, Geoff Brabham | | Holden LX Torana A9X | | |
| DNF | Peter Brock, Jim Richards | | Holden LX Torana A9X | Marlboro Holden Dealer Team | |
