= Thursday Night Live =

Thursday Night Live may refer to:

- Saturday Night Live Weekend Update Thursday, a spin off of NBC's Saturday Night Live, broadcast in 2008.
- Thursday Night Live, a short lived version of UK television series Central Weekend broadcast in 1996.
- Thursday Night Live (TV series), an Australian variety sports show on TV channel One.
