= Bill & Boz =

- Genre: Sport
- Presented by: Bill Woods; Mark Bosnich
- Country of origin: Australia
- Original language: English
- No. of seasons: 3
- No. of episodes: 576

Production
- Camera setup: Multiple-camera setup
- Running time: 60 minutes (2017); 90 minutes (2018-2019) (including commercials)

Original release
- Network: Fox Sports News (2017-2019)
- Release: 22 January 2017 – 18 December 2019

Bill & Boz was an Australian sports television show broadcast on Fox Sports News four nights a week from Sunday to Wednesday. It was hosted by journalist Bill Woods and former Socceroo goalkeeper Mark Bosnich, along with a rotating panel of guests.

The show debuted on 22 January 2017 at 9.30pm as a 1-hour show.. On 4 February 2020, Woods announced on Twitter that the show had been cancelled.

== See also ==
- List of Australian television series
