= Brian Sampson (racing driver) =

Australian racing driver (1935–2023)

Brian Roy Sampson (17 June 1935 – 17 November 2023) was an Australian racing driver.

Sampson had a long career throughout the 1960s and 1970s. Sampson was a mainstay of the Australian Motor Industries-Toyota Team at the Bathurst 500 from 1965 to 1970, winning Class A in 1969 in a Toyota Corolla.

Well noted as a collector and racer of Cheetah racing cars, Sampson is best remembered as Peter Brock's co-driver to win the 1975 Bathurst 1000. He also won the 1977 Rothmans 500 co-driving with Warren Cullen.

Sampson died on 17 November 2023, at the age of 88.

== Career results ==
Season	Series	Position	Car	Entrant
1984	Australian Super Series	**2nd**	Mitsubishi Starion	Melbourne Clutch & Brake Service Pty Ltd

=== Complete World Touring Car Championship results ===
(key) (Races in bold indicate pole position) (Races in italics indicate fastest lap)

Year	Team	Car	1	2	3	4	5	6	7	8	9	10	11	DC	Points
1987	(Australia) Everlast Automotive Services	Holden VL Commodore SS Group A	MNZ	JAR	DIJ	NUR	SPA	BNO	SIL	BAT; 14	CLD	WEL	FJI	NC	0

=== Complete Phillip Island/Bathurst 500/1000 results ===
Year	Team	Co-drivers	Car	Class	Laps	Pos.	Class pos.
1961	(Australia) Monash Service Station	(Australia) Jim Gullan (Australia) John Connolly	Renault Gordini	D	157	9th	1st
1962	(Australia) Rex Emmett	(Australia) Rex Emmett (Australia) John Connolly	Renault Gordini	C	162	6th	1st
1965	(Australia) Australian Motor Industries	(Australia) Lew Marshall	Toyota Corona	B	116	23rd	4th
1966	(Australia) Australian Motor Industries	(Australia) Ern Abbott	Toyota Corona	B	116	27th	7th
1967	(Australia) AMI Toyota	(Australia) Barry Ferguson	Toyota Corolla	B	117	DSQ	DSQ
1968	(Australia) AMI Racing Team	(Australia) Barry Ferguson	Toyota Corolla	A	113	30th	2nd
1969	(Australia) AMI Toyota	(Australia) Bob Morris	Toyota Corolla	A	112	29th	1st
1970	(Australia) AMI Racing Team	(Australia) Dick Thurston	Toyota Corolla	A	113	27th	4th
1971	(Australia) AMI Racing Team		Toyota Corolla 1200	A	102	DNF	DNF
1974	(Australia) Holden Dealer Team	(Australia) Peter Brock	Holden LH Torana SL/R 5000	3001 – 6000cc	118	DNF	DNF
1975	(Australia) Gown - Hindhaugh	(Australia) Peter Brock	Holden LH Torana SL/R 5000 L34	D	163	1st	1st
1977	(Australia) Pioneer Electronics	(Australia) Warren Cullen	Holden LX Torana SS A9X Hatchback	3001cc – 6000cc	39	DNF	DNF
1979	(Australia) Re-Car Racing	(Australia) Alan Browne	Holden LX Torana SS A9X 4-Door	A	133	17th	10th
1980	(Australia) Re-Car Consolidated Industries	(Australia) Alan Browne	Holden Commodore (VC)	3001-6000cc	158	4th	4th
1982	(Australia) Everlast Battery Service	(Australia) Bill O'Brien	Ford Falcon (XD)	A	134	20th	13th
1983	(Australia) Everlast Battery Service	(Australia) Bill O'Brien	Ford Falcon (XD)	A	136	19th	17th
1985	(Australia) Melbourne Clutch & Brake Service	(Australia) Garry Waldon	Mitsubishi Starion Turbo	B	117	DNF	DNF
1987	(Australia) Everlast Automotive Services	(Australia) Bill O'Brien	Holden VL Commodore SS Group A	1	146	14th	9th
1988	(Australia) Everlast Battery Service	(Australia) Bill O'Brien (Australia) Ray Lintott	Holden VL Commodore SS Group A SV	A	66	DNF (DND)	DNF (DND)
1990	(Australia) Everlast Battery Service	(Australia) Bill O'Brien	Holden VL Commodore SS Group A SV	1	153	8th	8th

=== Complete Indonesian Grand Prix results ===
Year	Car	1	2	Rank	Points
1993	Cheetah Mk.9 Holden	SEN; 5	SEN; 9	7th	10

Sporting positions
Preceded by John Goss; Kevin Bartlett	Winner of the Bathurst 1000; 1975 (with Peter Brock)	Succeeded by Bob Morris; John Fitzpatrick
