= 1977 Rothmans 500 =

Endurance race for Group C Touring Cars

The 1977 Rothmans 500 was an endurance race for Group C Touring Cars. The event was staged at the Oran Park Raceway in New South Wales on 12 June 1977 over 222 laps of the "Grand Prix" circuit, totalling 582 km. Competing cars were divided into the following three classes based on engine capacity:

- Class A: Over 3000 cc
- Class B: 2001–3000 cc
- Class C: Up to 2000 cc

This was the first of two "Rothmans 500" events held at Oran Park, the second and final race being the 1978 Rothmans 500.

== Results ==
Position	Drivers	No.	Car	Entrant	Class	Laps
1	Warren Cullen, Brian Sampson	12	Holden Torana SL/R 5000 L34	Pioneer Electronics	A	222
2	Bob Forbes, Kevin Bartlett	10	Holden Torana SL/R 5000 L34	Andronicus Coffee	A	221
3	Lakis Manticas, Doug Chivas		Ford Capri V6	City Ford	B	220
4	Murray Carter, Bob Stevens		Ford XB Falcon GT Hardtop	Brian Wood Ford	A	219
5	Don Holland, Terry Shiel		Mazda RX-3	Penrith Mazda Centre	B	217
6	Garth Wigston, Bruce Hindhaugh		Holden Torana SL/R 5000 L34	Roadways	A	216
7	David Seldon, Graeme Lawrence		Triumph Dolomite Sprint	Orange City Leyland	C	215
8	Garry Willmington, Jeff Barnes		Ford XB Falcon GT Hardtop	Austral Hardware	A	215
9	Lynn Brown, Bruce Stewart		Mazda RX-3	James Mason Motors	B	214
10	John Duggan, Brian Wheeler		Mazda RX-3	W. Torr	B	214
11	Frank Porter, Jim Murcott		Alfa Romeo Alfetta GT	Beninca Motors	C	211
12	Brian Potts, Steve Land		Mazda RX-3	Brian Potts	B	211
13	Gary Cooke, Ben Penhall		Mazda RX-3	Mayrack Manufacturers	B	210
14	Ron Gillard, Bill Slattery		Alfa Romeo 2000 GTV	Freds Treads	C	208
15	Arthur Hardwick, Phil Alexander		Mazda RX-3	Arthur Hardwick	B	208
16	Geoff Leeds, Ralph Radburn		Mazda RX-3	Craven Mild Racing	B	204
17	Les Grose, Bill Stanley		Ford Capri V6	Les Grose	B	196
18	Barry Lee, Milton Leslight		BMW 2002	Chevelle Motors	C	170
19	Peter Granger, Terry Ryan		BMW 2002	Bob Glazier	C	127
20	Stephen Evans, Joe Butta		Morris Cooper S	Stephen Evans	C	111
DNF	Stanley, Mahnken		Holden Torana SL/R 5000 L34		A	196
DNF	Daly, Barry Jones		Ford Escort RS2000		C	193
DNF	Barry Seton, Don Smith		Ford Capri V6	Amco	B	159
DNF	Schofield, Lucas		Holden Torana LJ GTR XU-1		A	148
DNF	Brian Callaghan, Pellatt		Holden Torana SL/R 5000 L34		A	140
DNF	John Goss, Leo Leonard	2	Ford XB Falcon GT Hardtop	John Goss Racing	A	120
DNF	John Harvey, Wayne Negus	76	Holden Torana SL/R 5000 L34	Holden Dealer Team	A	111
DNF	Allan Moffat, Colin Bond	1	Ford XB Falcon GT Hardtop	Allan Moffat Ford Dealers	A	91
DNF	Peter Brock, Phil Brock	15	Holden Torana SL/R 5000 L34	Bill Patterson Racing	A	84
DNF	Russell Skaife, Bob Muir		Ford Capri V6		B	73
DNF	Ron Dickson, Fred Gibson		Ford XB Falcon GT Hardtop		A	58
DNF	Farrar, Millard		Ford Capri V6		B	52
DNF	Allen, Ray Gulson		Chrysler Valiant Charger		A	49
DNF	Allen, Martin		Holden Torana SL/R 5000 L34		A	39
DNF	Booth, Christie		Triumph Dolomite Sprint		C	27
DNF	Allan Grice, Jack Brabham		Holden Torana SL/R 5000 L34	Craven Mild Racing	A	24
DNF	Bryant, Gall		Mazda RX-3		B	8
DNF	Nuttall, White		Fiat 124S		C	6
DNF	Chris Heyer, Lander		Volkswagen Golf		C	2
DNF	Dick Johnson, Jim Richards	19	Ford XB Falcon GT Hardtop		A	0
