= Ultimate Tag (Australian TV series) =

- Genre: Sports entertainment; Game show
- Based on: Ultimate Tag by Natalka Znak
- Presented by: Abbey Gelmi; Matt Shirvington; Bill Woods
- Opening theme: "Ladies and Gentlemen" by Saliva
- Country of origin: Australia
- Original language: English
- No. of seasons: 1
- No. of episodes: 10

Production
- Production location: Australia
- Camera setup: Multi-camera
- Running time: 75 minutes
- Production companies: Endemol Shine Australia; Znak & Co.; Fox Alternative Entertainment

Original release
- Network: Seven Network
- Release: 7 March – 4 April 2021

Ultimate Tag was a short-lived Australian sports entertainment obstacle course competition based on the American series of the same name which premiered on Seven on 7 March 2021. Following the premise of the original version, the format was based on the game of tag and involved contestants running through various indoor obstacle courses while professional taggers attempt to catch them. Abbey Gelmi and Matt Shirvington hosted the series, with Bill Woods as commentator.

After three episodes, the series was moved to Channel Seven's sister channel 7flix due to unexpectedly low viewership. Seven conceded the series failed to resonate with audiences and would not be returning for a second season, and was eventually cancelled shortly afterwards.

== Format ==
The competition took place across six Heats, three Semi-Finals and the Grand Final, with every course and run becoming more difficult and challenging. The courses included Survival Tag, Gravity Tag, Revenge Tag, The Wall, Stealth Tag, Dodge Tag, The Alley and The Vortex. The winner of the series would receive $100,000, the 2 winners were Peter Jaeger of the men's category and Danielle Buttsworth the women's.

== Production ==
In July 2020, it was announced that Seven Network had purchased the rights to the series and would will making their own version of the show for Australian audiences in 2021. Auditions were open between July & August 2020. The series was officially confirmed by Seven at their annual upfronts in October 2020, produced by Endemol Shine Australia and with Abbey Gelmi and Matt Shirvington announced as hosts and Bill Woods as commentator.

== Taggers ==
List of taggers competing in the series:

- Stephanie Beck as Spitfire
- Tommy Browne as Titan
- Bridget Burt as Bandit
- Ruel DaCosta as Bulldog
- Dominic Di Tommaso as Dominator
- Jenna Douros as Ricochet
- Greg Eckels as Eagle
- Tristan Hodder as Firestarter
- Ali Kadhim as Ghost
- EJ Kaise as Cyclone
- Michael Khedoori as The Kid
- Conor Loughman as Arrow
- Aleksei Mast as Hammer
- Amy Morrison as Riot
- Mahalia Murphy as Defender
- Emma Nedov as Supernova
- Brodie Pawson as Rapid
- Dylan Pawson as Razor
- Paul Pedersenn as Redback
- Jamie Scroop as Avalanche
- Katelyn Seary as Wildcat
- Shaun Wood as Hollywood

Scott Evennett was set to appear under the Tagger name Striker but injured himself on the first day of filming.

DaCosta also appears on the American version under the same Tagger name of Bulldog; DaCosta was also a consultant on the show, designing and developing games, courses and obstacles for the Australian version.

== Ratings ==
No.	Title	Air date	Timeslot	Overnight ratings		Consolidated ratings		Total viewers	Ref(s)
No.	Title	Air date	Timeslot	Viewers	Rank	Viewers	Rank	Total viewers	Ref(s)
1	Heat 1	7 March 2021	Sunday 7:00 pm	447,000	8	30,000	8	477,000	
2	Heat 2	8 March 2021	Monday 7:30 pm	260,000	—N/a	—N/a	—N/a	260,000	
3	Heat 3	9 March 2021	Tuesday 7:30 pm	277,000	20	—N/a	—N/a	277,000	
4	Heat 4	14 March 2021	Sunday 7:00 pm	59,000	—N/a	—N/a	—N/a	59,000	
5	Heat 5	15 March 2021	Monday 7:30 pm	64,000	—N/a	—N/a	—N/a	64,000	
6	Heat 6	21 March 2021	Sunday 7:00 pm	79,000	—N/a	—N/a	—N/a	79,000	
7	Semi-Final 1	22 March 2021	Monday 7:30 pm	60,000	—N/a	—N/a	—N/a	60,000	
8	Semi-Final 2	28 March 2021	Sunday 7:00 pm	47,000	—N/a	—N/a	—N/a	47,000	
9	Semi-Final 3	29 March 2021	Monday 7:30 pm		—N/a	—N/a	—N/a		
10	Grand Final	4 April 2021	Sunday 7:00 pm		—N/a	—N/a	—N/a		
