= Thursday Night Live (TV series) =

Australian television series

- Starring: Bill Woods (host); Mark Howard
- Country of origin: Australia
- No. of seasons: 2

Production
- Running time: 120 minutes (including commercials)

Original release
- Network: One
- Release: 2 April 2009 – 30 September 2010

Thursday Night Live is an Australian sports program that first aired on One on 2 April 2009. It aired on Thursdays at 7.30pm, and ran for two hours.

The show was hosted by Bill Woods, with regular panelists Nicole Livingstone (former Olympic swimmer), Cameron McConville (former V8 driver), Luke Darcy (former AFL player) and Jeremy Smith (former NRL player) appearing throughout the show. Mark Howard appeared on the show as the quiz host and announcer. Woods also crosses to Brad McEwan to see what is coming up on Sports Tonight.

The show was filmed in front of a live audience at the Ten Studios in Sydney.

The show did not return in 2011.
