= Jessica Shirvington =

Australian author

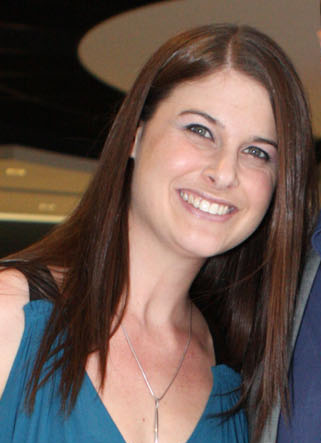
Jessica Shirvington (2012)

Jessica Shirvington, née Pagent, (born in Sydney on 15 April 1979) is an Australian author. She is best known for her book series Embrace, also called The Violet Eden Chapters.

Shirvington and her husband, Australian athlete and television presenter Matt Shirvington, live in Mosman. They have two daughters and a son.
