= Australian Motor Industries =

Former automotive company in Australia

- Emblem featured on the sides of cars assembled by AMI during the 1960s and 1970s
- Industry: Automotive
- Founded: 1926
- Defunct: 1987
- Fate: Bought out by Toyota
- Successor: Toyota Motor Corporation (Australia)
- Headquarters: Port Melbourne, Australia

Australian Motor Industries (AMI) was an automobile assembly firm that was significant in the early history of the automotive industry in Australia.

== Start of production ==
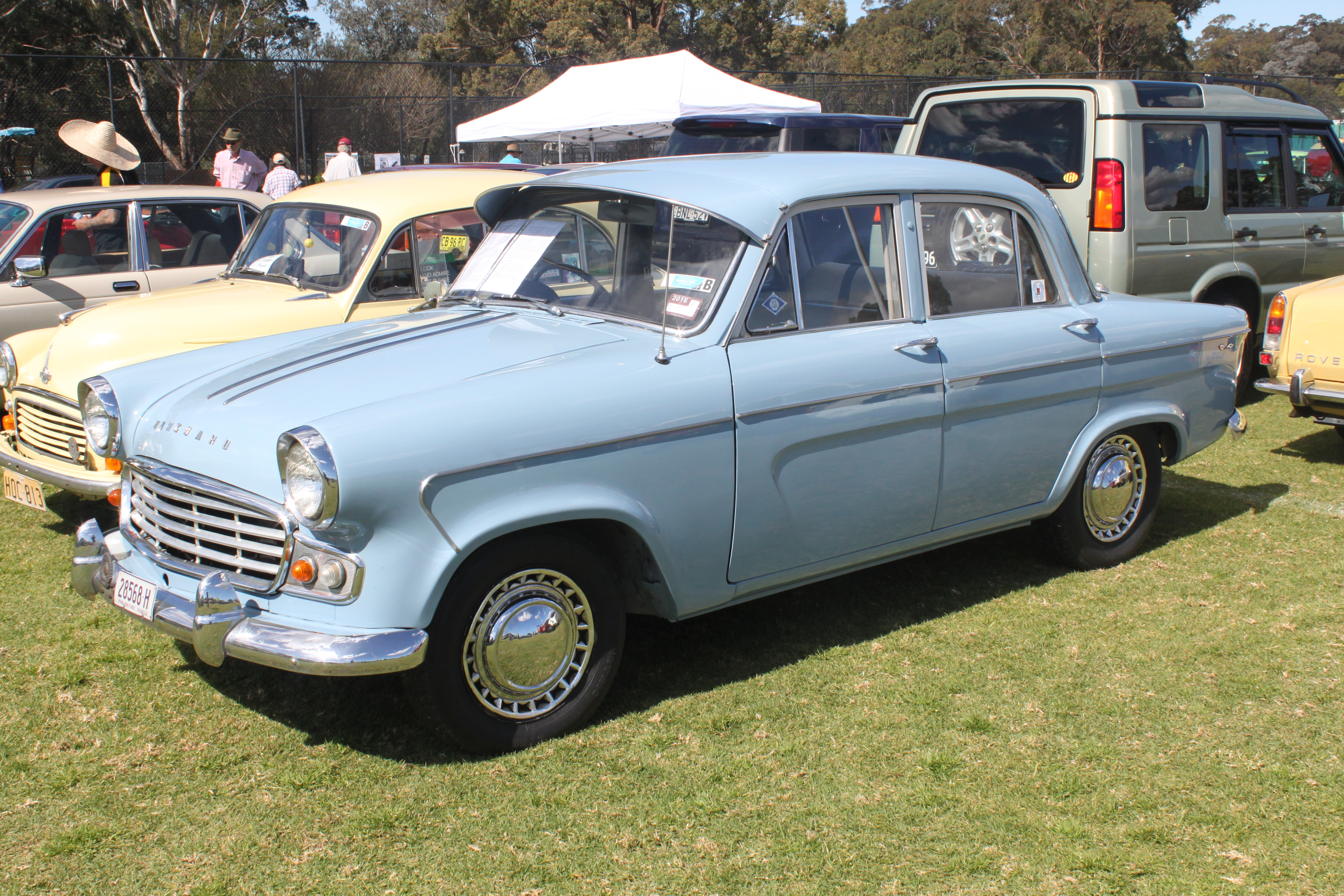
The Standard Vanguard was produced by AMI from 1958 to 1964

The origins of Australian Motor Industries can be traced back to 1926 when J.F. Crosby decided to invest in Eclipse Motors Pty Ltd of Melbourne. In 1929, the company secured the Victorian agency for Standard Motor Company's cars, then changed the company name to Talbot and Standard Motors, and began a steady period of expansion with the Standard marque through the 1930s. In 1952, the Crosby family formed a holding company, Standard Motor Products, in cooperation with the Standard Motor Company of England to assemble cars at a new assembly plant in Port Melbourne. The subsidiary company responsible for vehicle assembly was the Standard Motor Company (Australia) Limited. It made the Standard Eight, Vanguard, Spacemaster, and the Triumph Mayflower.

Import tariffs on vehicles had encouraged the growth of the Australian vehicle body-building industry since the early 1920s. The tax concessions varied with the degree of local content.

Changes within the industry saw the principal manufacturers' consolidation and the smaller body-builders' demise. The Port Melbourne assembly plant was one of many new facilities set up to meet the post-war demand for new vehicles. By 1955, the assembly complex had expanded to 33 acres (13 ha; 0.052 sq mi) of land and the new engine assembly plant had a capacity of 100 engines per eight-hour shift.

Standard Motor Products Ltd was unusual in the Australian motor industry because of the high Australian shareholding of the company; 88% in 1952, when the Australian company bought out its English partner. The remaining shares were held by the Standard Motor Company (SMC). As a sign of the close cooperation between the two companies, SMC's Sir John Black was made president, and Arthur Crosby remained chairman. His brother, Clive Crosby, became the managing director. By 1956, the factory employed over 1,600 workers.

When Leyland Motors, the new owners of Standard, indicated it wished to assume its production of Triumph cars in Australia, AMI needed to find another car to assemble. The answer came with Mercedes-Benz. In 1958, the company negotiated with Daimler-Benz to assemble and distribute Mercedes-Benz vehicles in Australia. In recognition of this new agreement, the company was renamed Australian Motor Industries, and a new subsidiary company was formed to handle the Mercedes-Benz franchise. Passenger vehicle sales show 729 locally assembled Mercedes-Benz cars were sold between July 1959 and June 1960. By 1960, Mercedes-Benz had increased passenger car sales in Australia by ten-fold annually, selling as many cars per year as in the first fifty years.

Leyland decided not to proceed with its Australian operation, allowing AMI to begin production of the Triumph Herald in 1959. AMI also assembled Ferguson tractors through another subsidiary company of the group, British Farm Equipment. An extensive dealer network throughout New South Wales and Victoria saw Standard cars and Ferguson tractors marketed in country areas. The most popular car sold was the Vanguard model.

== Reorganisation ==
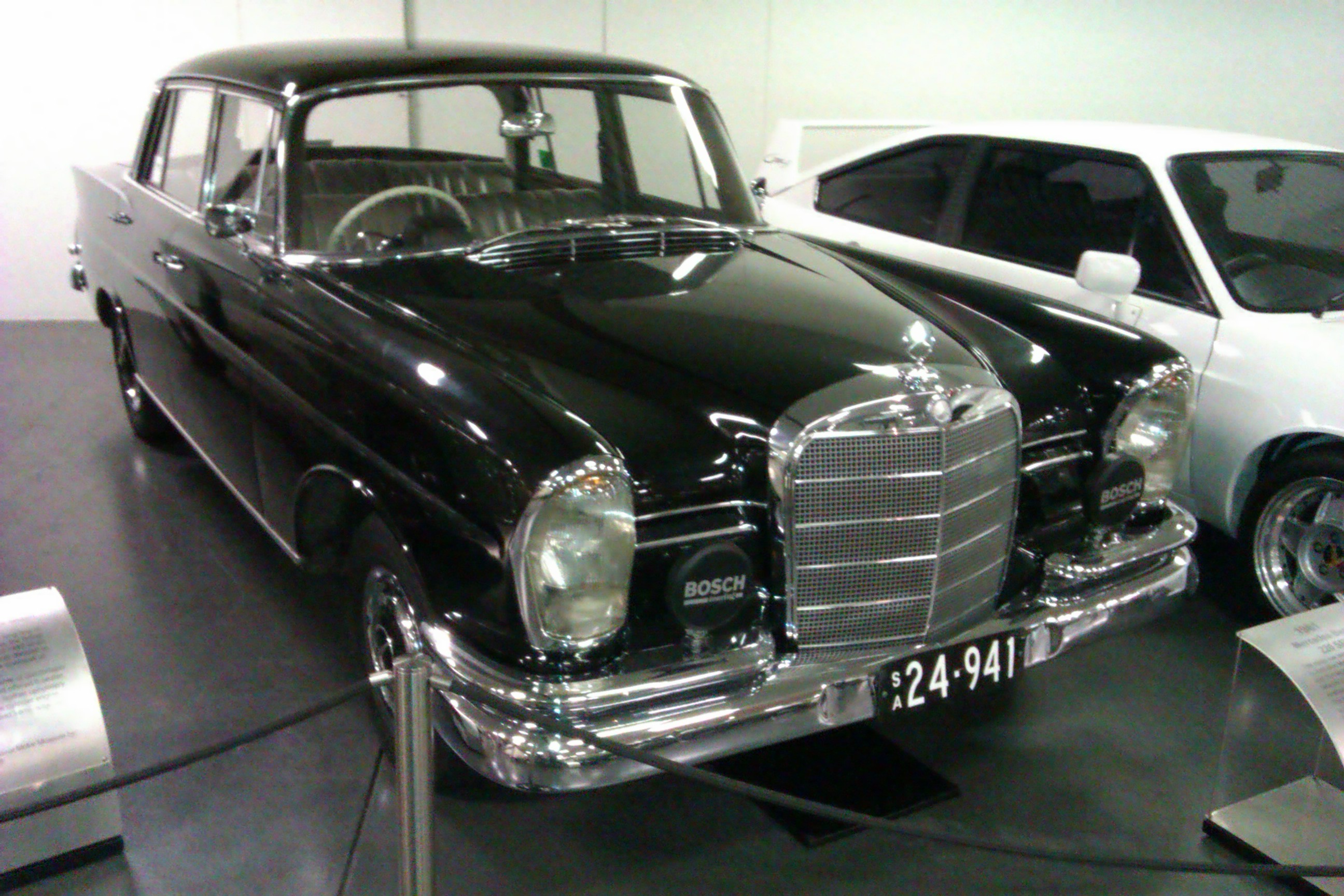
1961 Mercedes-Benz 220SEb assembled by AMI

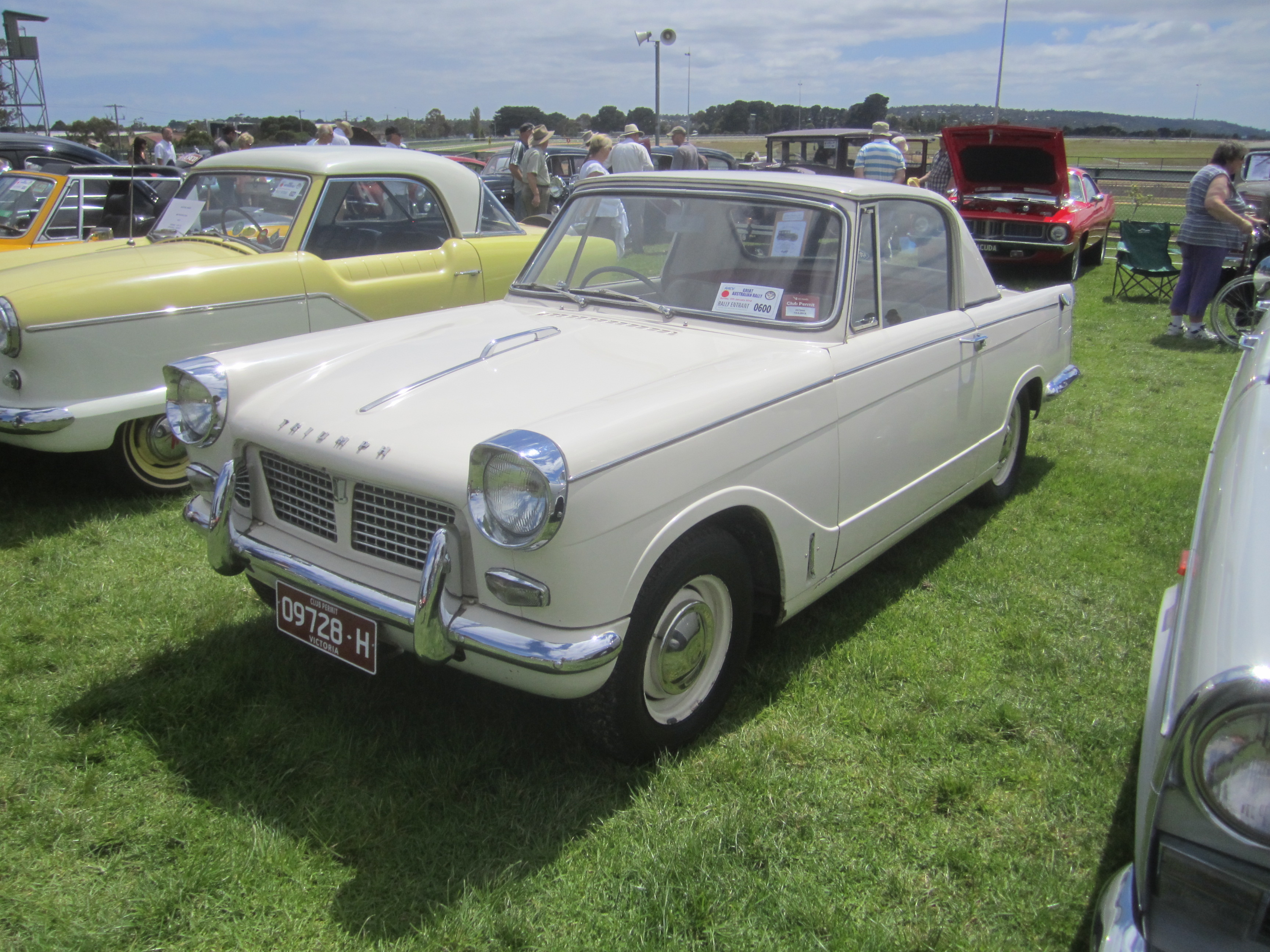
1959 Triumph Herald assembled by AMI

In October 1960, AMI signed an agreement with American Motors Corporation (AMC) to assemble the Rambler range of cars from knock-down kits. Another deal with Fiat was planned to replace the Ferguson tractors distributed by BFE. The Standard Motor Company had sold its tractor facility in Coventry to Massey Ferguson and focused on automobile production.

Australian Motor Industries ran into financial trouble during the Australian credit squeeze of 1961, and the company was forced to sell off many assets and vehicle stock to remain solvent. Part of the restructuring resulted in selling their share in the Mercedes-Benz franchise to the German parent company.

In 1963, the company secured the Australian franchise for Toyota cars and began assembly of the Tiara range. From this point, the company's financial position steadily improved. By 1967, AMI assembled 32 models for the Australian market and imported fully assembled Toyota Corollas for their dealer network. Australian Motor Industries also assembled the Rambler range from American Motors Corporation (AMC) and Triumph cars from Leyland Motors. Leyland inherited AMI shares when it merged with Standard-Triumph International in 1961.

During the early 1960s, the foreign share of the automobile motor vehicle market was estimated to be 95%, and as the only sizeable producer with local equity, AMI continued to manufacture overseas designs.

Australian Motor Industries assembled the Triumph Herald from 1959 until 1966. They produced a few unique models for the Australian market. Assembly of the Standard Vanguard Six at the AMI plant continued for about one year after production had ended in Britain. However, the engine remained for fitment to the Triumph 2000. The Triumph 2000/2500 range was assembled in Port Melbourne from 1964 through the mid-1970s.

By 1965, the demise of the Standard Vanguard and the loss of assembly rights for Mercedes-Benz vehicles left AMI with additional capacity to assemble Rambler, Triumph, and Toyota models.

== Operations with AMC ==
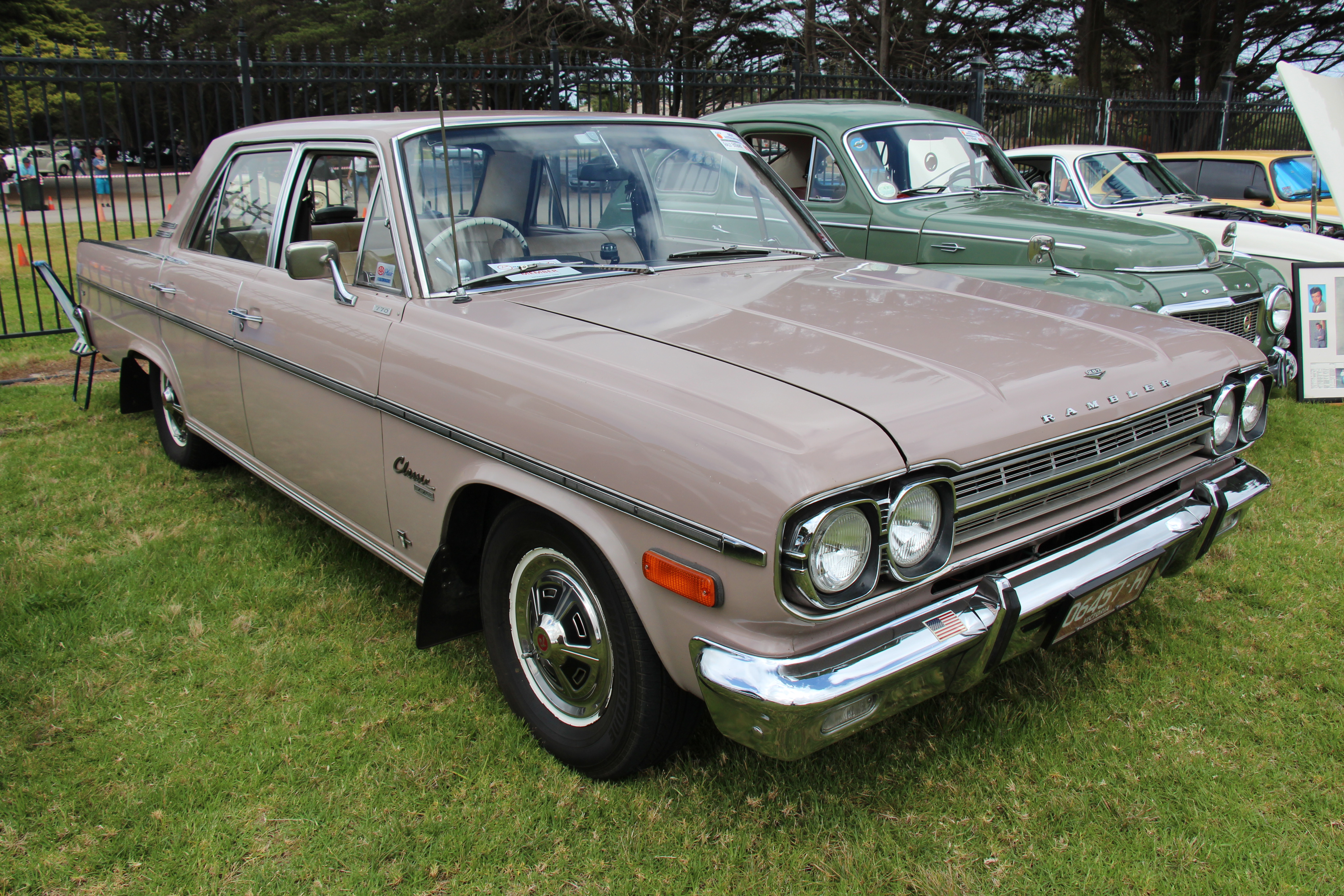
1966 Rambler Classic, built in Australia.

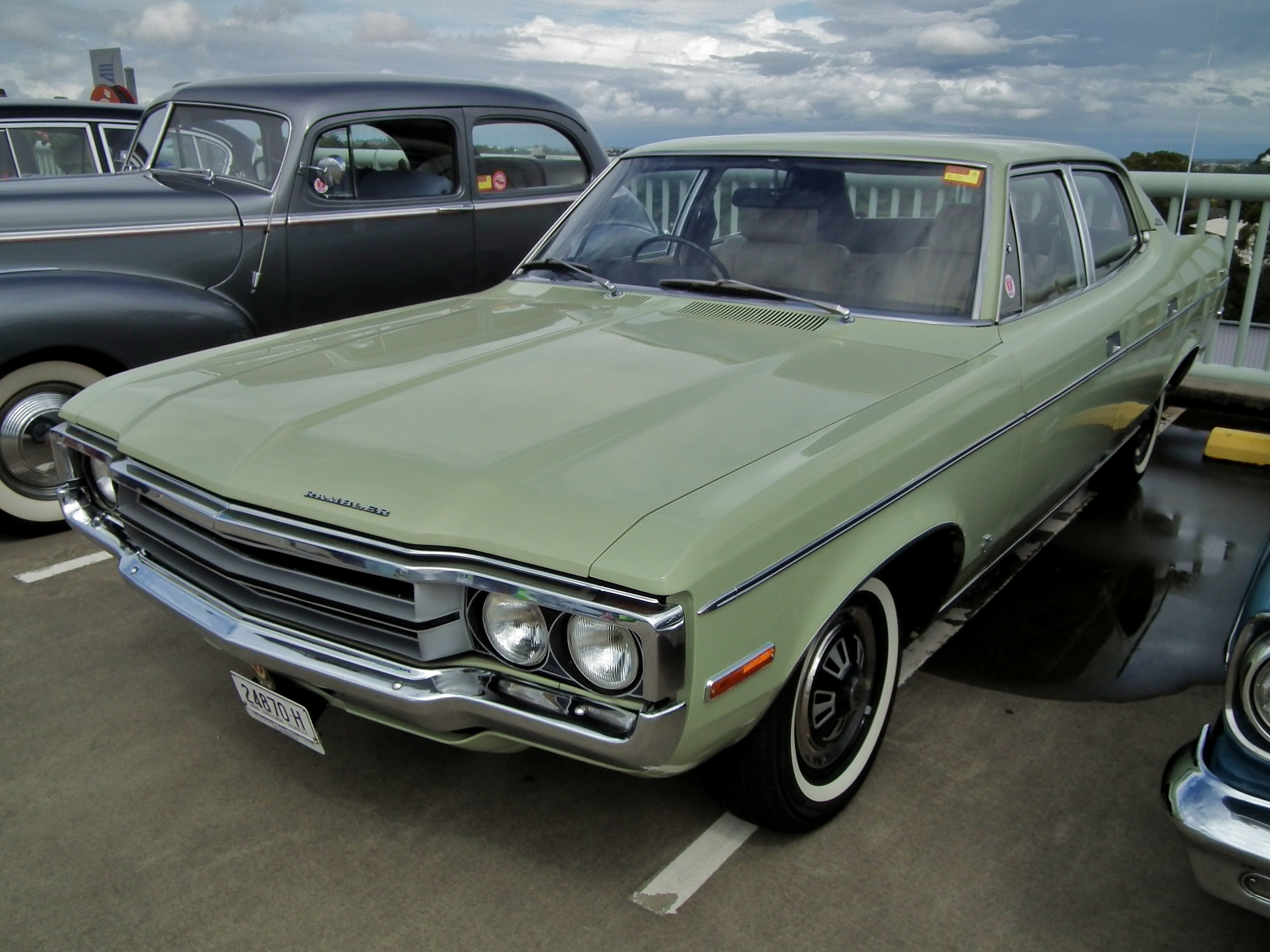
1971 Rambler Matador (assembled in 1972)

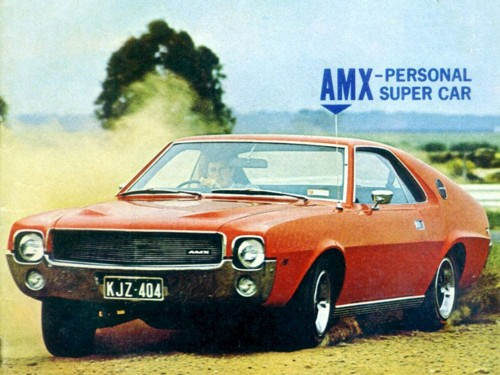
1969 Rambler AMX assembled by AMI

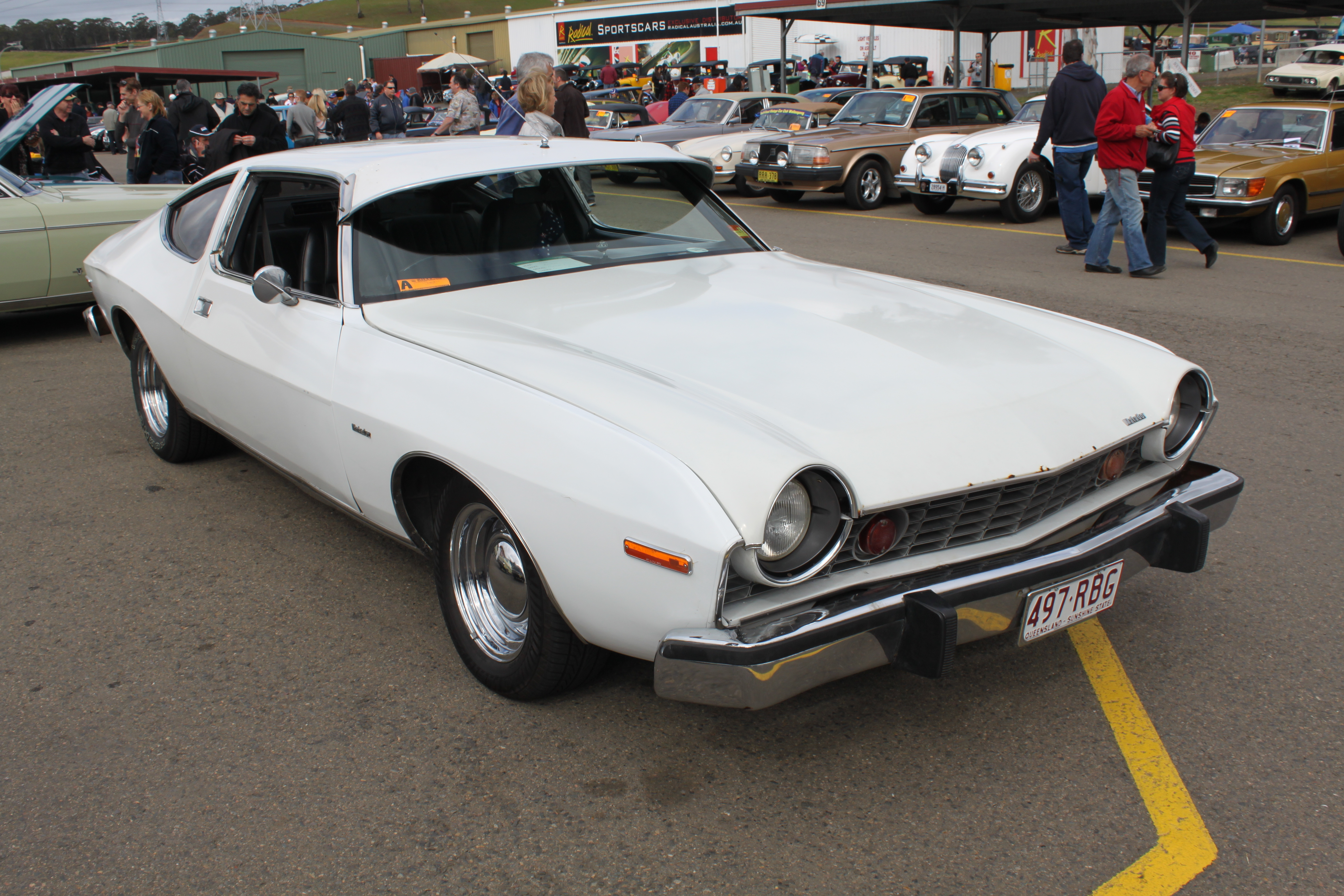
1974 Rambler Matador Coupe (Australian models were assembled in 1976)

In 1961, AMI began the assembly of a range of AMC cars, beginning with the Rambler Ambassador, all with right-hand drive and carrying the Rambler brand name. By the end of the 1960s, Australians could purchase a locally assembled Rambler Javelin, AMX, Hornet, Rebel, or Matador long after the Rambler marque was discontinued from use on the equivalent U.S.-market models.

Knock-down kits were shipped from AMC's Kenosha, Wisconsin facility, but the Australian cars were assembled with a percentage of "local content" to gain tariff concessions. Australian suppliers delivered many parts and components, such as glass, seats, upholstery and carpet, lights, tailshafts, and heaters. AMI specified what parts were not to be included in the unassembled kits sent by AMC. Other necessary parts specified by the assembler were boxed and shipped for assembly at the final destination in Australia. It is unknown exactly how many parts were included to be installed by the assembly operation, which varied with each operation. AMI chose external colors for the Rambler cars, matching those used on that period's AMI-assembled Triumphs and Toyotas. The distinctive AMI exterior emblems were affixed on Ramblers as well as Triumph and Toyota cars assembled by AMI from 1968 onward.

The Australian-assembled Rebel was made from 1967 until 1971, even though the last year of the American model was 1970. A total of 345 Rebels were assembled in 1970, and 307 were built in 1971. Australian Rebels were equipped with the dash and instrument cluster of the 1967 RHD Rambler Ambassador. This dashboard continued until the Australian-assembled replacement AMC Matador was introduced.

A total of 24 two-seat AMC AMXs, all 1969 models, were made by AMI between August 1969 and July 1970. All featured the 343 cu in (5.6 L) V8s. Differences to the RHD two-seater AMXs compared to the U.S. models included swapping the power brake booster and heater motor on the firewall. However, the power steering pump remained in its usual position on the left side. The remaining steering components had to be relocated to the right side of the car. All Australian AMX interiors were finished in black, featuring a unique RHD dashboard with a wood-grained instrument cluster in front of the driver. While the AMX was marketed as a performance muscle car in the U.S. marketplace, the Australian AMXs came with a substantially higher level of standard features that were optional in the U.S. The AMI AMXs were advertised as personal luxury cars.

One fully finished AMC Gremlin was imported from the U.S. in 1970 for evaluation purposes. It was converted to right-hand-drive and branded as a "Rambler Gremlin". The car features the standard 232 cu in (3.8 L) I6 engine with three-speed manual transmission. The car was presented at the 1970 Sydney Motor Show to gauge interest and test the market but never went into production.

From 1971, Australian-assembled Matadors were equipped with standard column shift automatic transmissions, power steering, power windows, air conditioning, and an AM radio. In later model years, the engine was upgraded to AMC's 360 cu in (5.9 L) V8. Options included an exterior sun visor over the windshield, full vinyl roof cover, tow hitch, and mud flaps.

A total of 118 Hornets and 145 Matadors (118 sedans and 27 station wagons) were sold during 1974. Registrations for 1975 were 136 Hornets and 118 Matadors (85 sedans and 33 wagons). The final year of Hornet production was 1975, leaving the Matador as the only AMC product after that. In 1976, 88 Matadors (78 sedans and ten station wagons) were registered. The assembly of 80 Matador Coupes occurred in 1976. The knock-down kits had arrived in late 1974, but were not worked on. The Matador Coupes were sold as 1977 models, bringing 1977 registrations to 80 Matador Coupes, 24 Matador sedans, and three station wagons. December 1976 marked the end of the local assembly of AMC vehicles.

One fully assembled AMC Pacer was imported for evaluation purposes. AMI did not construct the Pacer for the Australian market.

While Toyota and Triumph began to be AMI's main focus, the company retained a niche market as the sole U.S.-sourced cars marketed in the Australian marketplace. For example, the Government of New South Wales selected the Rambler Rebel and the Matador as official vehicles in the 1970s.

== Toyota and buyout ==
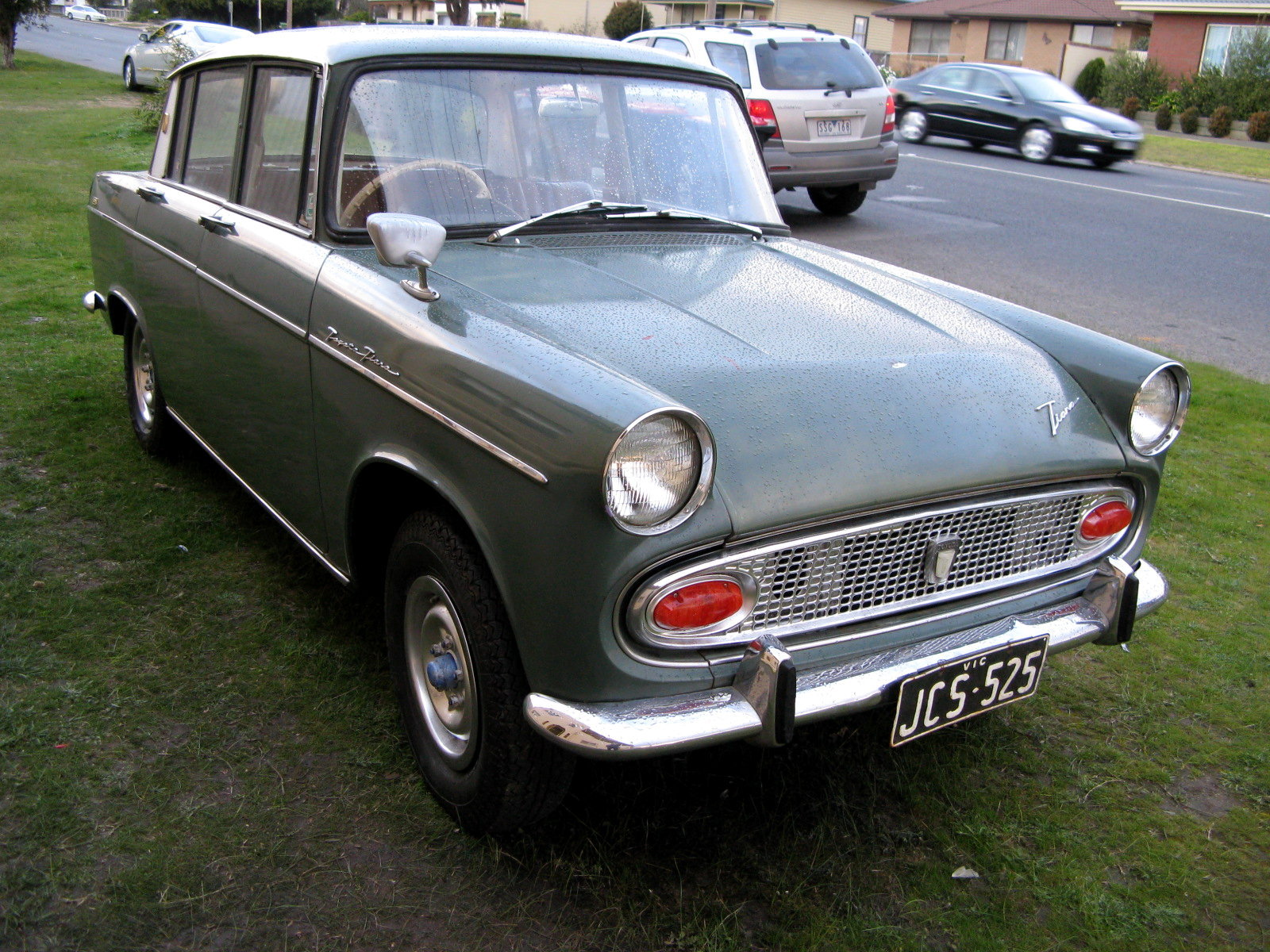
The Toyota Tiara was the first Toyota model assembled by AMI

Australian Motor Industries assembled the first Toyota car built outside Japan in April 1963, the Toyota Tiara. Assembly of Toyotas by AMI expanded in the 1960s to include the Crown, Corona, and Corolla at the Port Melbourne facility. Toyota Motor Corporation of Japan purchased shares to control 10% of the Australian company. As a fast-growing company, Toyota took a controlling interest in AMI in 1968, just as a contract with British Leyland was signed. Toyota also purchased a 40% share in Thiess Toyota, the importer of Toyota light commercial vehicles from Thiess. In 1971, British Leyland absorbed the British Motor Corporation, thereby acquiring Standard Triumph. Toyota purchased more shares to increase their AMI holdings to 50%.

Recognizing the company's controlling owner and the products it manufactured and marketed, AMI renamed itself AMI Toyota Ltd in 1985. The company continued to be listed on the Australian Securities Exchange with a minority Australian shareholding until 1987, when Toyota acquired all shares held by remaining shareholders.

The Japanese company then amalgamated it with its other Australian operations in 1989 to form two organizations. Toyota Motor Corporation Australia, which was responsible for passenger vehicles, and Toyota Motor Sales Australia, which became accountable for Toyota commercial vehicles and Hino trucks.

Toyota vehicle production was transferred from the historic Port Melbourne factory in 1994 to the company's new $420 million facility at Altona, Victoria. Production was focused on vehicles based on the Toyota Camry. The Australian facility also exported CKD kits to assembly plants in Thailand, Malaysia, Indonesia, Vietnam, and the Philippines until 2017 when Toyota ceased all car production in Australia.
