= Matt Shirvington =

Australian sprinter (born 1978)

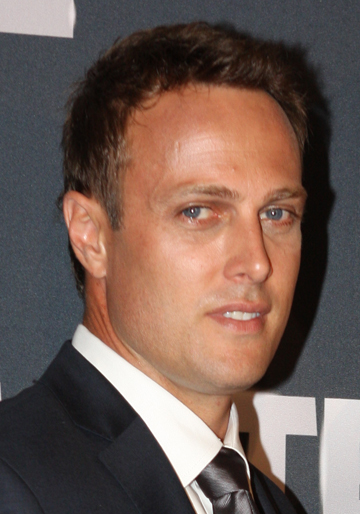
- Shirvington in 2013

Personal information
- Nicknames: Shirvo, The Package,
- Born: 25 October 1978 (age 48) Davidson, New South Wales, Australia
- Spouse: Jessica Shirvington

Sport
- Country: Australia
- Sport: Men's athletics
- Events: 100 metres; 200 metres; 4 × 100 metres relay

Achievements and titles
- Olympic finals: 2000 Sydney: Men's 100 m – Semi-finalist; 2000 Sydney: Men's 200 m – Quarter-finalist
- World finals: 2001 Edmonton: 4 × 100 m – Bronze
- National finals: 2000 Telstra Athletics Championships, Hobart: Men's 100 m – Gold; 2001 Telstra Athletics Championships, Sydney: Men's 100 m – Gold; 2002 Telstra Athletics Championships, Canberra: Men's 100 m – Gold; 2003 Telstra Athletics Championships, Adelaide: Men's 100 m – Gold; 2004 Telstra Athletics Championships, Perth: Men's 100 m – Gold; 2005 Telstra Athletics Championships, Perth: Men's 100 m – Gold
- Commonwealth finals: 1998 Kuala Lumpur: Men's 100 m – Finalist
- Personal best: 10.03 seconds (1998 CG: Kuala Lumpur): Men's 100 m
Medal record
Men's athletics
Representing Australia
World Championships
Bronze medal – third place	2001 Edmonton	4 x 100 m relay
Commonwealth Games
Bronze medal – third place	1998 Kuala Lumpur	4 x 100 m relay

Matt Shirvington (born 25 October 1978) is an Australian former athlete and television presenter who held the Australian 100 m national sprint title from 1998 to 2002. In April 2026, Shirvington was still the fifth-fastest Australian sprinter of all time. He qualified for the 100 m semi-finals in Sydney 2000, finishing 5th.

Shirvington is currently co-host of the Seven Network's breakfast television program Sunrise alongside Natalie Barr.

== Athletics ==
Shirvington generally competed in the 100 m, 200 m and 4 × 100 m relay events, finding the most success in the 100 m sprint. He competed in the 2000 Olympic Games, the Athletics World Championships from 1999 to 2007 and the Commonwealth Games in 1998 and 2006.

From 1998 Shirvington claimed five consecutive Australian national titles for the 100 m sprint event. At the 1998 Commonwealth Games in Kuala Lumpur, he broke the Australian national 100 m record, finishing fourth in the final with a time of 10.03 seconds. Shirvington held the record until Patrick Johnson recorded 9.93 seconds in 2003. He also featured in two World Indoor Championships 60 m finals.

== Television ==
=== Seven Network ===
In 2004, Shirvington was a contestant in the first series of Dancing with the Stars and in 2005 was a presenter and reporter on Beyond Tomorrow.

In July 2020, Shirvington joined the Seven Network as weekend sport presenter on Seven News Sydney, replacing Jim Wilson. He also was a fill-in host and sports presenter on Sunrise, Weekend Sunrise and The Morning Show.

On 1 February 2021, Shirvington started hosting the competition series Holey Moley, and on 7 March 2021 he started hosting the competition series Ultimate Tag.

In January 2022, Seven Network announced that Shirvington will join as a host on Sydney Weekender, replacing the long-running host Mike Whitney.

In July 2022, Shirvington was part of the commentary team for the network's coverage of the 2022 Commonwealth Games in Birmingham.

In June 2023, Seven Network announced that Shirvington will permanently replace David Koch as the co-host of Sunrise, having filled in for him regularly on Fridays in recent months. He commenced on Monday 12 June.

In October 2026, Seven Network announced that Shirvington would host a new quiz show, Stacks of Cash in 2027.

=== Sky News Australia and Foxtel ===
In June 2010, Shirvington joined Sky News Australia as a sports presenter. In 2013, Shirvington was announced as the new host of the Fox Sports NRL coverage and joined The Back Page as a co-host. In 2014, he co-hosted the ASTRA Awards with Shaynna Blaze. Shirvington has previously been the host of Friday Night Football on Fox League.

=== Other ===
In 2009, Shirvington had a cameo and one line in the third episode of :30 Seconds.

Shirvington appeared in a guest role on the Australian version of The Biggest Loser in 2010.

In 2024, he made a cameo in Home and Away.

== Links with NRL clubs ==
=== St George Illawarra Dragons ===
In the 2012 NRL pre-season, Shirvington was appointed a sprint training coach for the St George Illawarra Dragons despite being a fan of the Manly Warringah Sea Eagles.

=== Manly Warringah Sea Eagles ===
In the 2016 NRL pre-season, Shirvington signed up as a Sea Eagles member and recorded a video message encouraging other Manly supporters to either renew their membership or to sign up. Shirvington also regularly promotes the Sea Eagles via social media.

=== Cronulla Sharks ===
In February 2026, Shirvington announced that he had joined the Cronulla Sharks in a speed coaching role for the 2026 NRL season.

== Personal life ==
Raised in Davidson, a suburb of Sydney, Shirvington has also lived in London. He attended St Martin de Porres Catholic Primary School in Davidson. He has also been a National Ambassador for Canteen, an Australian support organisation for young children living with cancer.

Shirvington is married to author Jessica Shirvington. They have two daughters and a son. They live in Mosman, New South Wales.
