= V8 Supercar Championships =

V8 Supercars Australia awards five championships Level One and Level Two for Drivers, Manufacturers Championship and Level One Teams Championship and Level Two Privateers Team Championship.

== Level One ==
The Level One Australian Touring Car Championship now known as the V8 Supercar Championship Series caters for the 31 fully professional cars run by the 14 two-car and 3 one-car well-sponsored V8 Supercar teams. The series is commercially successful and highly competitive, with races all over Australia, one in New Zealand, and in 2006, the first race in Bahrain. Tracks range from street circuits (such as the Adelaide circuit) to more permanent road courses (such as the Phillip Island Grand Prix Circuit). The largest single event is the Bathurst 1000.

The racing is very close and aggressive between all the V8 Championship Series teams, with usually less than a second separating the top 25 cars. Teams design and construct their own cars and engines (Some teams opt to buy engines from stronger teams, e.g. SBR, 888, BJR and PCR use SBR developed Ford V8's, while HRT, HSVDT and Perkins Engineering use HMS developed Holden V8's while the rest of the Holden teams use their own developed Holden V8's) leading to minor/major (depending on teams) engineering differences among teams despite the cars being the same make.

Both Ford and Holden provide significant, though varying, levels of sponsorship to the majority of teams that run their cars. From 1996 to 2002, V8 Supercars Holden Racing Team, had a decisive competitive edge over most of the opposition. More recently, the sport has seen the return to prominence of Ford through Marcos Ambrose and Stone Brothers Racing, winning in 2003 and 2004, as well as team-mate Russell Ingall who kept the title at SBR, winning a tight series in 2005

V8 Supercars is Australia's third largest sport behind AFL Football and Horse racing.

The first Australian Touring Car Championship under the V8 Supercar rules was won by Glenn Seton with his team-mate former Formula One world champion Alan Jones taking second in the championship.

== Teams Championship ==
In 2005, the "Team's Championship" was created by simply adding together the points of the team's drivers. Stone Brothers Racing won the inaugural title in 2005 with Russell Ingall (1st in Series) and Marcos Ambrose (3rd) combining for a winning 3778 point haul. In 2006, the Toll HSV Dealer Team won, with Rick Kelly winning the championship, and Garth Tander in fourth place.

== Manufacturers Championship ==
Each year (since 2004), supremacy between Ford and Holden has been decided by the Manufacturers Championship. Out of thirteen rounds, seven wins from drivers of one manufacturer are required to win. In 2004, Holden won 7-6, but for the last two seasons, Ford have won by the same 7-6 score line.

== Level Two ==
The privateers were split from the main series in the year 2000. Their Level Two series is now officially known as the Fujitsu V8 Supercar Series (although occasionally known as the V8 Supercar Development Series) and runs identical specification V8 Supercars, apart from differences with engine management systems and older chassis'.

The Development series has been such a success that it itself has also fielded full grids up to 34 cars on many occasions. Although as of 2009 numbers have dipped to less than half that number.

Both young up-and-coming drivers hoping to break into a Level One drive, and privateer hobby racers, race in the Level Two category.

== Third tier ==
A third-tier competition, not directly associated with V8 Supercar, the V8 Touring Car National Series sprang up in 2008 for deregistered cars from both v8 Supercar series.
